= Convention of Pardo =

Proposed agreement between Great Britain and Spain

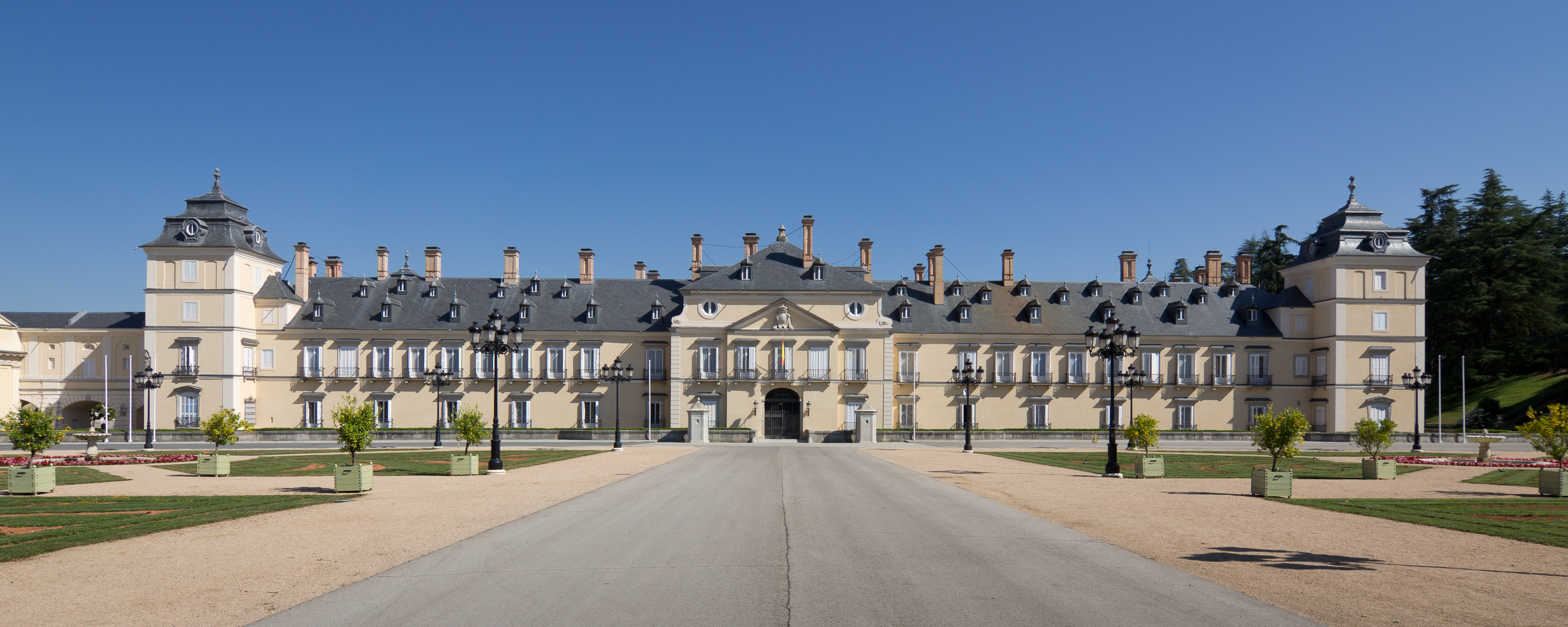
- Royal Palace of El Pardo
- Context: Settle issues between Britain and Spain
- Signed: 14 January 1739
- Location: Royal Palace of El Pardo, Madrid
- Effective: Not ratified
- Signatories: Sir Benjamin Keene
- Parties: Great Britain; Spain

The Convention of Pardo (Note: Also known as the Treaty or Convention of El Pardo) was a 1739 draft treaty between Britain and Spain. Signed by the negotiators on 14 January 1739, it was rejected by the British Parliament and never ratified, leading to the outbreak of the War of Jenkins' Ear on 23 October 1739.

The terms included compensation for alleged commercial losses incurred by British and Spanish merchants, and a Commission to settle boundaries in North America between Spanish Florida and the recently established British Province of Georgia.

== Background ==
The terms of the Treaty of Utrecht that ended the War of the Spanish Succession in 1713 gave Britain a number of commercial concessions. These included access to closely guarded markets in Spanish America, namely the Asiento de Negros, a monopoly to supply 5,000 slaves a year, and the Navío de Permiso, permitting British ships to sell 1,000 tons of goods in Portobelo, Colón and Veracruz. In reality, these were rarely used, the real profits coming from smuggled goods that evaded customs duties, with demand from Spanish colonists creating a large black market.

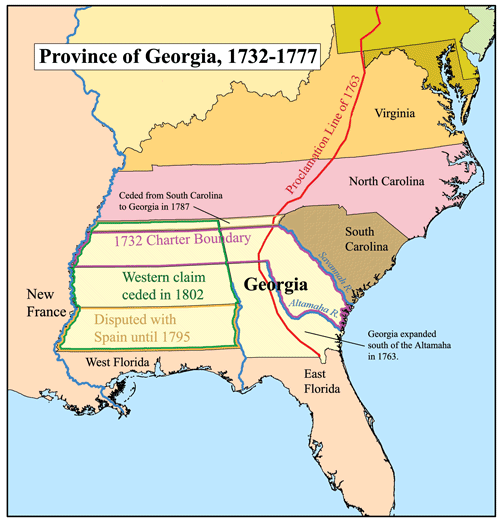
The establishment of Georgia in 1733 raised tensions by threatening Spanish possessions in the Caribbean Basin.

Accepting smuggling could not be stopped, the Spanish used it as an instrument of policy. During the 1727 to 1729 Anglo-Spanish War, French ships carrying contraband were let through, while British ships were stopped. While the British accepted the occasional confiscation as part of the cost of doing business, they were concerned at being permanently replaced by the French. This increased following the 1733 Pacte de Famille between Louis XV of France and his uncle Philip V of Spain.

The Treaty of Seville (1729) allowed the Guarda costa to search British vessels trading with Spanish colonies. During one such inspection in 1731, Robert Jenkins claimed his ear had been cut off, an incident forgotten as restrictions eased in 1732. However, the establishment of the British Province of Georgia in early 1733 appeared to threaten Spanish Florida, vital for protecting trade between mainland Spain and its colonies. A second round of 'depredations' in 1738 led to demands for compensation, British newsletters and pamphlets presenting them as inspired by France. This placed political pressure on Robert Walpole, the long-serving British Prime Minister, to reach a satisfactory deal.

== Negotiations ==
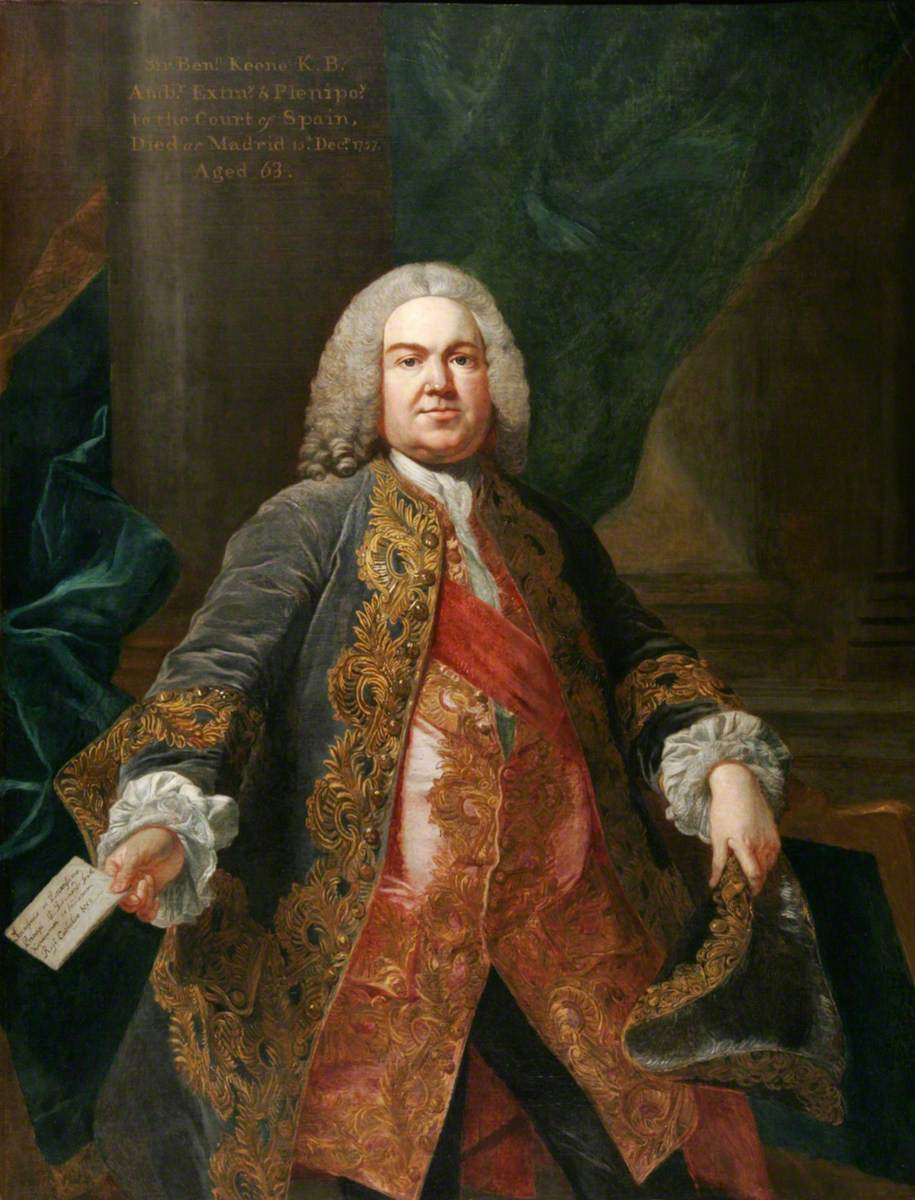
Benjamin Keene, British Ambassador to Spain and chief negotiator

Delegates from both sides met at the Royal Palace of El Pardo in Madrid from late 1738. By January 1739, they had drawn up a basic agreement. The British had initially demanded £200,000 in compensation but ultimately accepted just £95,000. Spain originally demanded unlimited rights to search vessels, but this was eventually restricted to those in Spanish waters.

In return, the British South Sea Company would pay Philip V of Spain £68,000 to settle his share of proceeds from the Asiento de Negros and a Boundary Commission established to settle borders between Georgia and Florida. The chief British negotiator Sir Benjamin Keene felt this was a good deal and signed on 14 January.

== Aftermath ==
The Convention was extremely unpopular in London. Many merchant captains were unhappy that the British compensation claim had been more than halved, the South Sea Company being concerned by the agreement allowing the Spanish limited rights to search British ships. Within months, the situation had turned sharply towards war, and the Convention grew increasingly fragile. Opponents published a list of all those who voted in favour of the Convention, including details of their income from government positions.

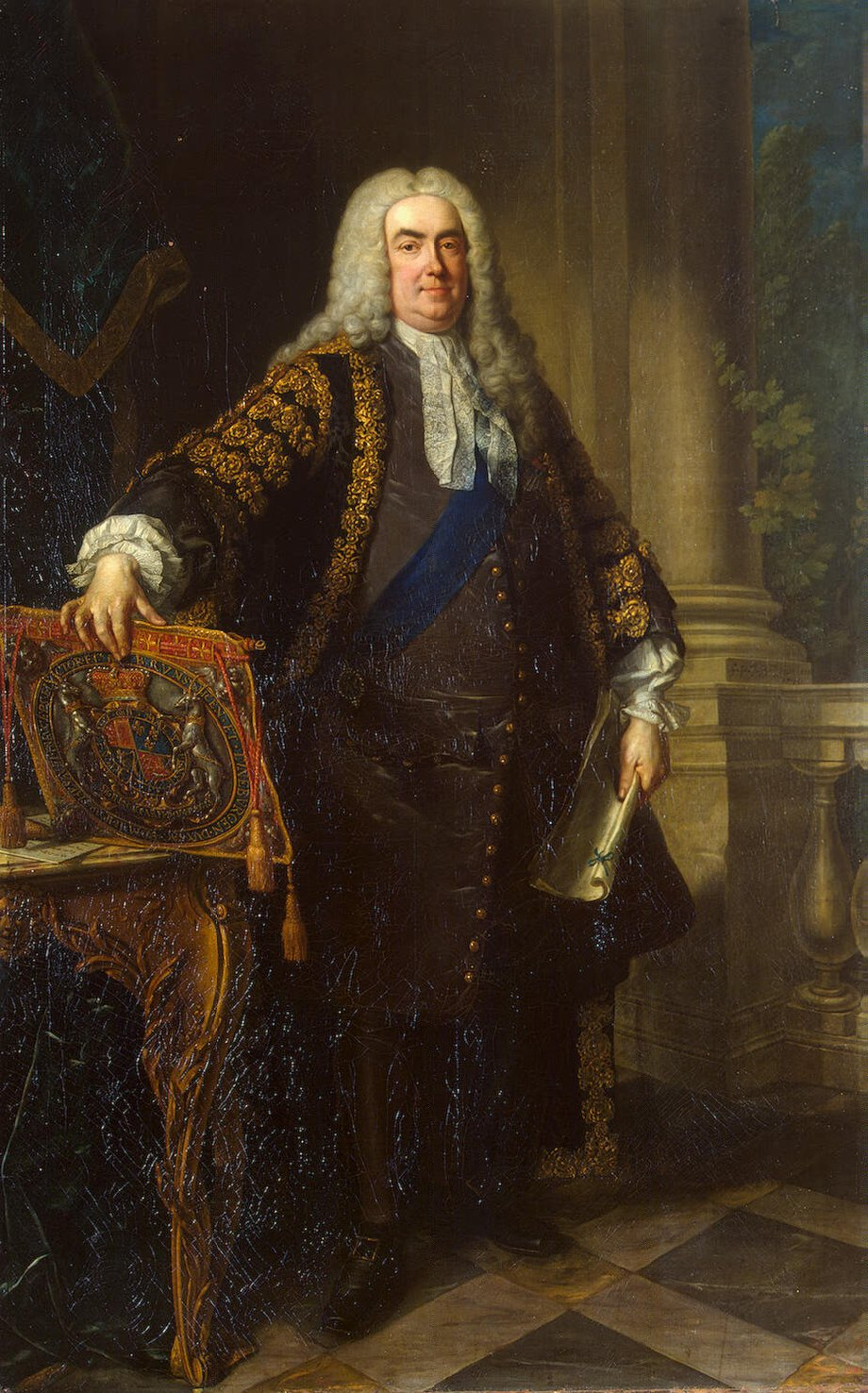
Robert Walpole, British Prime Minister

When the South Sea Company refused to pay the agreed £68,000, Philip V rescinded the asiento de Negros. On 20 July 1739, the Admiralty sent a naval force under Admiral Vernon to the West Indies, reaching Antigua in early October. Three British ships attacked La Guaira, principal port of the Province of Venezuela on 22 October; Britain formally declared war the next day, beginning the War of Jenkins' Ear.

Sir Benjamin Keene was closely associated with Walpole and after his fall, there was some discussion of impeaching him for negotiating the Convention. The war later become submerged into the wider War of the Austrian Succession. The issues that had started the war were largely ignored during the Congress of Breda and the Treaty of Aix-la-Chapelle that ended it in 1748, as they were no longer priorities for the two sides.

Some issues were eventually resolved in the 1750 Treaty of Madrid, but illegal British trade with the Spanish colonies continued to flourish. The Spanish Empire in the Caribbean remained intact and victorious despite several English attempts to seize some of its heavily defended and fortified colonies. Spain would later use its trading routes and resources to help the rebels' cause in the American Revolution.

The issue resurfaced in the dispute between the United States and Spain known as the West Florida Controversy; it was initially resolved by Pinckney's Treaty in 1796, then settled when Spanish Florida was relinquished in the 1819 Adams–Onís Treaty.

== Sources ==
- Anderson, MS (1976). Europe in the Eighteenth Century, 1713-1783 : (A General History of Europe). Longman. ISBN 978-0582486720.
- Browning, Reed (1975). The Duke of Newcastle. Yale University. ISBN 9780300017465.
- Browning, Reed (1993). The War of the Austrian Succession. St. Martin's Press. ISBN 978-0312094836.
- Harbron, John (1998). Trafalgar and the Spanish Navy: The Spanish Experience of Sea Power. Naval Institute Press. ISBN 978-0870216954.
- Ibañez, Ignacio Rivas (2008). Mobilizing Resources for War: The Intelligence Systems during the War of Jenkins' Ear. PHD UCL.
- McKay, Derek (1983). The rise of the great powers, 1648-1815. London: Longman. ISBN 978-0582485549.
- Mclachlan, Jean O (1940). Trade and Peace with Old Spain (2015 ed.). Cambridge University Press. ISBN 978-1107585614.
- Richmond, Herbert (1920). The Navy in the War of 1739-48 - War College Series (2015 ed.). War College Series. ISBN 978-1296326296.
- Rodger, NAM (2005). The Command of the Ocean: A Naval History of Britain 1649-1815. W. W. Norton & Company. ISBN 978-0393060508.
- Simms, Brendan. Three Victories and a Defeat: The Rise and Fall of the First British Empire. Penguin Books, 2008.
- Woodfine, Philip (1998). Britannia's Glories: The Walpole Ministry and the 1739 War with Spain. Royal Historical Society. ISBN 978-0861932306.
