= Treaty of El Pardo (1728) =

1728 treaty

The Treaty of El Pardo (or Convention of El Pardo) was concluded between Great Britain and Spain in March 1728 at the El Pardo Palace in Madrid.

It effectively brought an end to the Anglo-Spanish War (1727) by sorting out the main points of dispute between the two states although a subsequent Congress of Soissons and a Treaty of Seville would build on them. The British aim was to make peace with Spain before it joined a potential alliance with Austria. However, the terms, agreed by the British Ambassador in Madrid, Benjamin Keene were considered too lenient by his superiors in London, and they were repudiated leading to the later discussions at Soissons, which lasted nearly a year.

Despite the efforts of diplomats, a fresh war would break out between Britain and Spain in 1739, little more than a decade later.

== Bibliography ==
- Browning, Reed. The Duke of Newcastle. Yale University Press, 1975.
- Simms, Brendan. Three Victories and a Defeat: The Rise and Fall of the First British Empire. Penguin Books, 2008.
