= Treaty of Aranjuez (1752) =

1752 treaty between Austria, Spain, and Sardinia

- 18th century Italy; note Kingdom of Sardinia; main Spanish possessions Kingdom of Sicily and Parma; main Austrian possessions Tuscany and Milan
- Context: Austria, Spain and Sardinia
- Signed: 14 June 1752
- Location: Aranjuez
- Negotiators: (Holy Roman Empire) Esterhazy; (Holy Roman Empire) Count Migazzi; (Spain) José de Carvajal y Lancáster; (Kingdom of Sardinia) Count St Marsan; (Kingdom of Great Britain) Benjamin Keene
- Parties: Spain; (Holy Roman Empire) Austria; Sardinia

The Treaty of Aranjuez (1752) was signed on 14 June, 1752, between Austria, Spain and the Kingdom of Sardinia.

Under the agreement, the signatories guaranteed their respective boundaries in Italy, as set out in the Treaty of Aix-la-Chapelle. The treaty was brokered by Britain, which saw it as a way of separating Spain from France.

Although this objective was superseded by the 1756 Diplomatic Revolution, in which Austria replaced its alliance with Britain in favour of one with France, it successfully ended conflict in Italy for over 40 years.

== Background ==
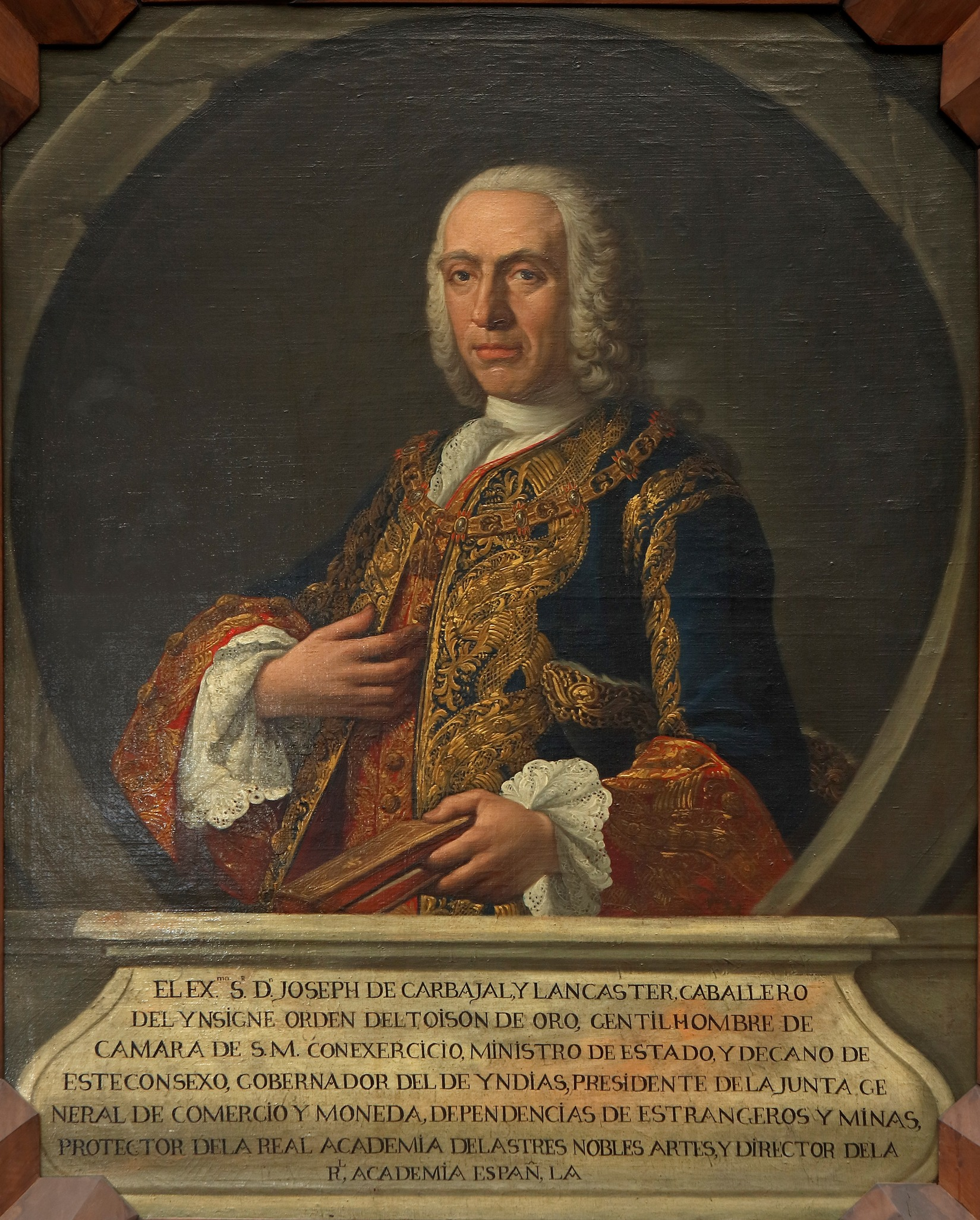
Portrait of José de Carvajal y Lancáster

During the War of the Austrian Succession, Austria and Sardinia contested control of Northern Italy with Spain; in the 1748 Treaty of Aix-la-Chapelle, Austria made minor concessions to Sardinia and Spain, although both considered their gains inadequate.

In July 1746, French-born Philip V of Spain was succeeded by Ferdinand VI, who was more pro-British than his predecessor. Under the Duke of Newcastle, British foreign policy was to isolate France by bringing Spain into the Pragmatic Alliance that fought the war; he ordered his diplomats in Madrid and Vienna to do all they could to support a rapprochement between the two countries.

He was helped by the fact Ferdinand's wife, Barbara of Portugal, was a cousin of Empress Maria Theresa and also supported a closer relationship with Austria. In April 1751, Esterhazy, the new Austrian ambassador in Madrid, presented a proposal under which Spain and Austria would guarantee the Italian boundaries agreed at Aix-la-Chapelle. The influential British Ambassador to Spain, Sir Benjamin Keene, suggested this could only be achieved by including Sardinia and Britain, but Spanish foreign minister José de Carvajal y Lancáster felt it was too great an expansion.

While Maria Theresa detested Charles Emmanuel III of Sardinia, her primary objective was the recovery of Silesia, ceded to Prussia in 1745; peace in Italy would allow her to concentrate on that objective. As a result, she agreed to bring Sardinia into the agreement, but as Carvajal pointed out, since Britain had no direct interest in Italy, there was no obvious reason to include it. In addition, Maria Theresa deeply resented the territorial concessions made at Aix-la-Chapelle under pressure from Britain.

Since Charles Emmanuel was also unhappy with these gains, he was unwilling to join a treaty that guaranteed them. While he eventually agreed to send Count St Marsan to Madrid, he refused to hold direct talks with Austria, which meant much of the negotiating was done by Carvajal, supported by Keene.

== Provisions ==
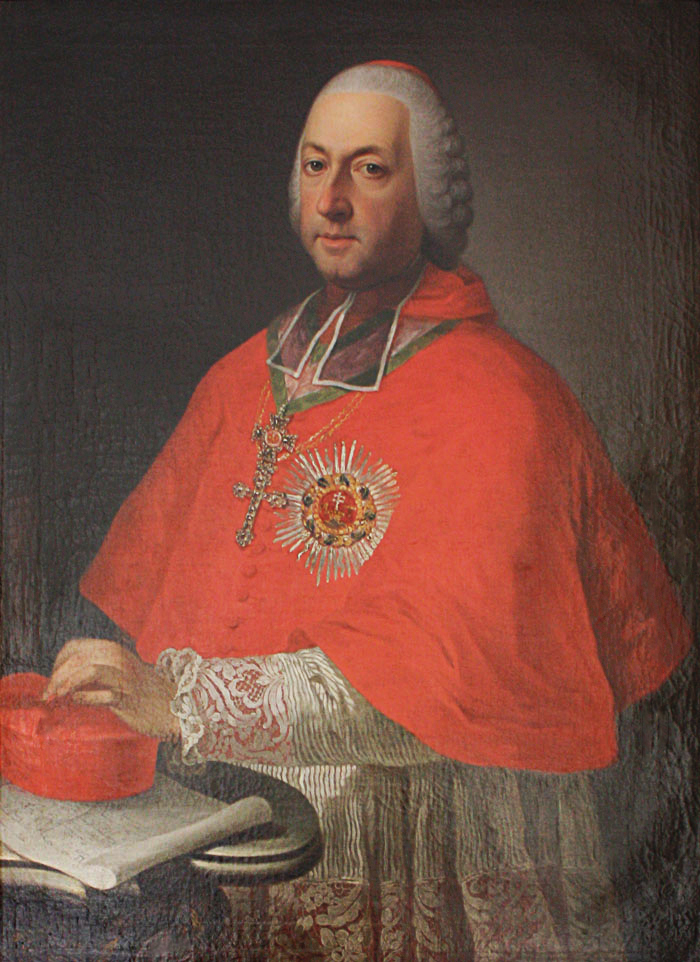
Austrian signatory Count Migazzi

While in principle the terms were relatively straightforward, negotiations were delayed by arguments over protocol; to demonstrate equality between the parties, St Marsan insisted he be allowed to sign one of the three copies first, which was rejected by both Spain and Austria. The Kingdom of Sardinia included the mainland territory of Piedmont, as well as the island of Sardinia (see Map); Maria Theresa argued since Austria had no navy, it was impossible for her to guarantee its boundaries, but St Marsan refused to sign if she did not.

A further delay occurred when Esterhazy fell ill and had to be replaced by Count Migazzi; on 10 April, Austria and Spain signed a draft treaty and only Keene's determination ensured discussions on adding Sardinia continued. Finally, Carvajal included a secret clause under which Spain agreed to transport Austrian troops to defend Sardinia if needed, and the treaty was finally signed on 14 June 1752.

The provisions included a mutual defence pact, under which the signatories guaranteed to support the current boundaries against interference from any other power. Another guaranteed all three states would accord Most favoured nation commercial status to the others citizens.

== Aftermath ==
Under the treaty, Spain was making a commitment on behalf of the Kingdom of Naples, ruled by Ferdinand's half-brother Charles; he refused to accede to it, effectively nullifying it from the very beginning. However, what was far more significant was the failure of Newcastle's anti-French policy; in the so-called 1756 Diplomatic Revolution, Austria and France ended their centuries long hostility by becoming allies. Ferdinand died in 1759, and was replaced by Charles, who appointed his son Ferdinand I as King of Naples; the combination meant Italy became a diplomatic backwater for the next forty years.

== Sources ==
- Gipson, Lawrence Henry (1946). "British Diplomacy in the Light of Anglo-Spanish New World Issues, 1750-1757". The American Historical Review. 51 (4): 627–648. doi:10.2307/1843901. JSTOR 1843901.
- Lodge, Richard (1932). "Presidential Address: Sir Benjamin Keene, K.B.: A Study in Anglo-Spanish Relations in the Earlier Part of the Eighteenth Century". Transactions of the Royal Historical Society. 15: 1–43. doi:10.2307/3678642. JSTOR 3678642. S2CID 163640610.
- Schumann, Matt. "British Foreign Policy During the Seven Years' War (1749-63)". Gale.com.
- Scott, Hamish (2015). The Birth of a Great Power System, 1740-1815. Routledge. ISBN 978-1138134232.
