= Congress of Soissons =

Peace negotiations between Great Britain and Spain

The Congress of Soissons was a diplomatic conference held between a number of European powers, principally Great Britain and Spain, between 14 June 1728 and July 1729 in the French town of Soissons.

== End of the Anglo-Spanish War of 1727 and attempt to prevent a Spanish-Austrian alliance ==
Along with the Convention of Pardo, it was designed to bring an end to the Anglo-Spanish War of 1727 by resolving their commercial and territorial disagreements. Spain agreed to recognise British possession of Gibraltar and Menorca in exchange for British recognition of Spanish rights in Italy. The ultimate aim of the British delegates Stephen Poyntz and Horatio Walpole was to prevent a Spanish-Austrian alliance from developing against Britain by resolving Britain's dispute with Spain as smoothly as possible. Directed by the Duke of Newcastle, the British took a relatively hard line, believing they were negotiating from a position of strength—a strategy that proved successful.

The Dutch Republic was represented at the conference by Rajan van Gosling and Cornelis Hop; France by, among others, Bufile-Hyacinthe-Toussaint de Brancas, known as the Comte de Céreste. Spain's representative included Álvaro de Navia-Osorio y Vigil. The Emperor's representatives in Soissons were Christoph Pentenrieder, Count Stefan Kinsky, and Leopold Johann Victorin von Windisch-Graetz. Johann von Reck served the British King as an advisor on Imperial affairs.

== The remaining disputes result in the War of Jenkins' Ear ==
It opened the way for a final treaty to be agreed between the two sides in Seville. However, many of the disputes between Britain and Spain flared up again over the next decade, leading the two states to fight each other again in the War of Jenkins' Ear in 1739.

== Bibliography ==
- Browning, Reed. The Duke of Newcastle. Yale University Press, 1975.
- Dhondt, Frederik. "Bringing the Divided Powers of Europe Nearer One Another: The Congress of Soissons, 1728–1730." Nuova Antologia Militare 3 (2022): 535–642.
- Simms, Brendan. Three Victories and a Defeat: The Rise and Fall of the First British Empire. Penguin Books, 2008.
