= Treaty of Madrid (5 October 1750) =

Commercial agreement between Britain and Spain

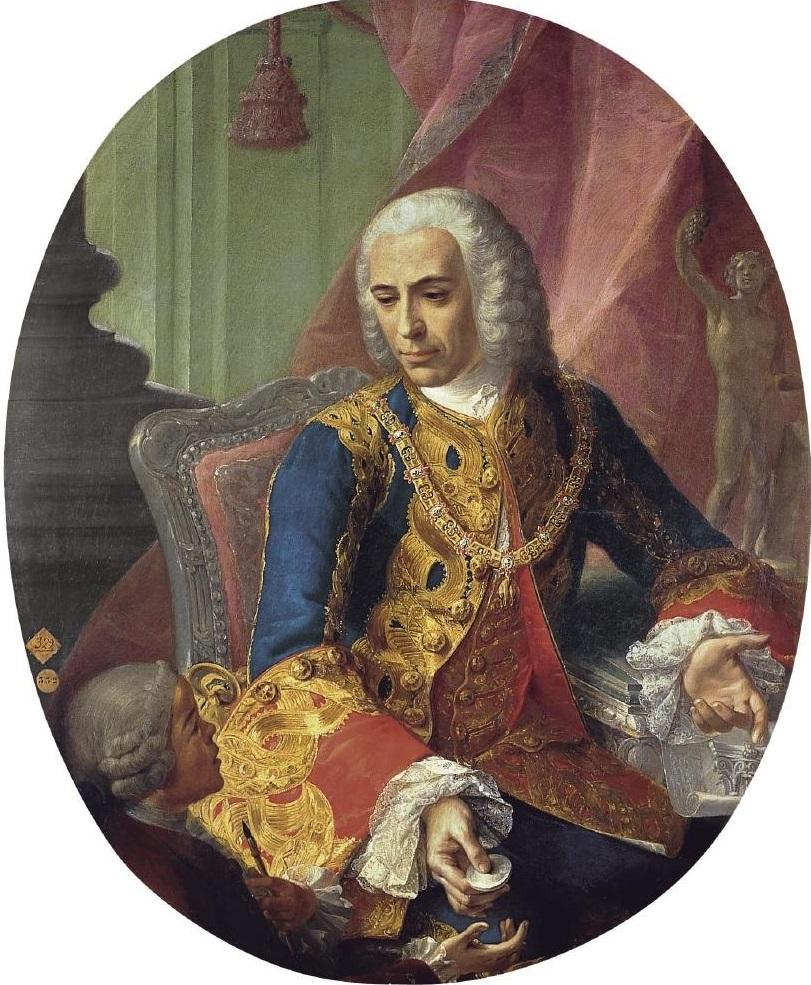
- Spanish negotiator José de Carvajal y Lancáster
- Context: Britain and Spain agree to terminate the Asiento awarded in 1713, in return for a one-off payment of £100,000 and renew trading rights for merchants in Cádiz
- Signed: 5 October 1750
- Location: Madrid
- Negotiators: (Kingdom of Great Britain) Benjamin Keene (Spain) José de Carvajal y Lancáster
- Signatories: (Kingdom of Great Britain) Benjamin Keene (Spain) José de Carvajal y Lancáster
- Parties: Great Britain; Spain
- Language: French, Spanish, English

The Treaty of Madrid, also known as the Treaty of Aquisgran, was a commercial treaty between Britain and Spain, formally signed on 5 October 1750 in Madrid.

Commercial tensions over the Asiento, a monopoly contract allowing foreign merchants to supply slaves to Spanish America (which was granted by the Spanish Crown to Britain via the 1713 Treaty of Utrecht), and alleged smuggling of British goods into Spain's American colonies led to the War of Jenkins' Ear in 1739. This was followed by the War of the Austrian Succession, ended by the 1748 Treaty of Aix-la-Chapelle.

In addition to the Asiento, there was also a substantial import and export trade between Spain and Britain, carried out by British merchants based in Cádiz. Due to an error by negotiators at Aix-la-Chapelle, the treaty failed to renew their trading privileges, which were treated as canceled by the Spaniards. Both sides also claimed they were owed large sums of money in regards to the Asiento.

However, the trade through Cádiz was equally important to Spain, while Ferdinand VI, who succeeded as king in 1746, was more pro-British than his predecessor. This allowed the two sides to reach agreement on a new treaty, which restored trading privileges, while the Asiento was canceled in return for a one time payment of £100,000 to the British.

== Background ==
The 1713 Treaty of Utrecht awarded Britain merchants limited access to the closed markets of Spanish America; these included the Asiento de Negros to supply 5,000 slaves a year and a Navío de Permiso, permitting limited direct sales in Porto Bello and Veracruz. The South Sea Company established to hold these rights went bankrupt in the 1720 "South Sea Bubble", and became a state enterprise, owned by the British government.

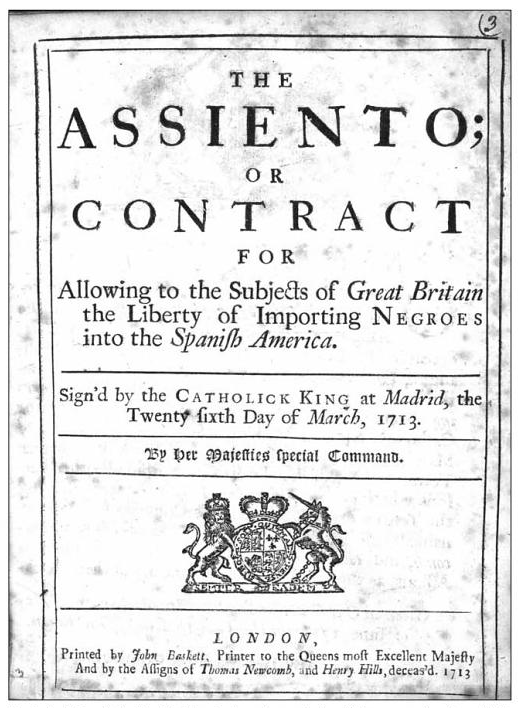
Cover of the English translation of the Asiento contract, 1713.

The heavy taxes imposed on all goods officially imported into Spanish America created a large and profitable black market for smugglers, many of whom were British. The Asiento itself was marginally profitable and has been described as a "commercial illusion"; between 1717 and 1733, only eight ships were sent from Britain to the Americas. The real benefit was that its ships were allowed to import goods customs-free.

However, the Spaniards tended to arrest any vessels caught with illegal goods, regardless of whether they were technically chartered by the South Sea Company, while other traders smuggled slaves, undermining the monopoly granted by the Asiento. The result was a series of claims and counter-claims; by 1748, the British argued they were owed nearly £2 million by the Spanish Crown, which claimed equally large amounts the other way.

These commercial issues led to the outbreak of the War of Jenkins' Ear in 1739, which became part of the wider War of the Austrian Succession in 1740, and the 1748 Treaty of Aix-la-Chapelle largely failed to remedy them. Although the Asiento was renewed for four years, the South Sea Company had neither the desire or capacity to continue; of far greater importance was the import and export trade carried out by British merchants based in Cádiz. British goods were imported for re-sale locally or re-exported to the colonies, Spanish dye and wool going the other way; one City of London merchant called the trade "the best flower in our garden."

John Montagu, 4th Earl of Sandwich, lead British negotiator at Aix-la-Chapelle, failed to include the Utrecht terms in the list of Anglo-Spanish agreements renewed in the Preliminaries to the treaty. When he tried to amend the final version, the Spaniards refused to approve it, threatening the lucrative import and export trade between the two countries. However, both sides wanted to resolve the problem, since the trade was equally valuable to Spain, while Ferdinand VI was more pro-British than his French-born predecessor Philip V.

José de Carvajal y Lancáster, the Foreign Minister negotiated directly with Sir Benjamin Keene, the experienced British Ambassador to Spain; draft terms were agreed on 5 October 1749, it was not formally ratified until a year later. The asiento was cancelled and all claims settled in exchange for a payment of £100,000 to the South Sea Company, the Cádiz merchants were allowed to resume operations, and Britain received favorable terms for trading with Spanish America.

== Provisions ==
The Treaty contained ten separate articles:

Article 1: Britain renounced its claim to the asiento and the Navio de Permiso;

Article 2: Spain paid compensation of £100,000, and in return, Britain cancelled any claim to further payments;

Article 3: Spain also cancelled claims relating to the asiento and the Navio de Permiso;

Article 4: British subjects would not pay higher (or other) duties in Spanish ports than those prevailing during the reign of Charles II of England;

Article 5: British subjects would be permitted to gather salt at Tortudos, as they had in the time of Charles II, allowing them to resume fishing operations by using it to preserve fish exported to Britain;

Article 6: British subjects would not pay higher duties than Spanish subjects;

Article 7: Subjects of both nations would pay the same duties, when bringing merchandise into each other's country by land, as they would by sea;

Article 8: Both countries would abolish all "innovations" that had been introduced into commerce;

Article 9: Arrangements were made to integrate the Treaty into the existing treaty system;

Article 10: An undertaking was made to execute the provisions of the Treaty promptly.

== Aftermath ==
Settlement of these issues helped the Duke of Newcastle pursue his policy of improving relations between the two countries, while Keene helped ensure the appointment of a succession of Anglophile ministers, including José de Carvajal and Ricardo Wall. Although Keene died in 1757, while Charles III of Spain succeeded Ferdinand in 1759, as a result Spain remained neutral in the Seven Years' War between Britain and France until 1762.

== Sources ==
- Anderson, Adam (1801). An Historical and Chronological Deduction of the Origin of Commerce, from the Earliest Accounts. J Walter.
- Anderson, M. S. (1976). Europe in the Eighteenth Century, 1713-1783. A General History of Europe (2nd ed.). Longman. ISBN 978-0582486720.
- Browning, Reed (1993). The War of the Austrian Succession. St. Martin's Press. ISBN 978-0312094836.
- Gipson, Lawrence Henry (1946). "British Diplomacy in the Light of Anglo-Spanish New World Issues, 1750-1757". The American Historical Review. 51 (4): 627–648. doi:10.2307/1843901. JSTOR 1843901.
- HMSO (1750). A Treaty concluded and signed at Madrid, on the 5th of October N. S. 1750, between the ministers plenipotentiaries of their Britannick and Catholick Majesties. Edward Owen. ISBN 9780665201509.
- Ibañez, Ignacio Rivas (2008). Mobilizing Resources for War: The Intelligence Systems during the War of Jenkins' Ear (PDF) (PHD). University College London.
- Lodge, Richard (1932). "Presidential Address: Sir Benjamin Keene, K.B.: A Study in Anglo-Spanish Relations in the Earlier Part of the Eighteenth Century". Transactions of the Royal Historical Society. 15: 1–43. doi:10.2307/3678642. JSTOR 3678642. S2CID 163640610.
- Mclachlan, Jean O (1940). Trade and Peace with Old Spain (2015 ed.). Cambridge University Press. ISBN 978-1107585614.
- Richmond, Herbert (1920). The Navy in the War of 1739-48 - War College Series (2015 ed.). War College Series. ISBN 978-1296326296.
- Schumann, Matt. "British Foreign Policy During the Seven Years' War (1749-63)". Gale.com.
- Simms, Brendan (2008). Three Victories and a Defeat: The Rise and Fall of the First British Empire. Penguin Books.
