= Benjamin Keene =

British diplomat and politician (1697–1757)

Sir Benjamin Keene FRS, KB
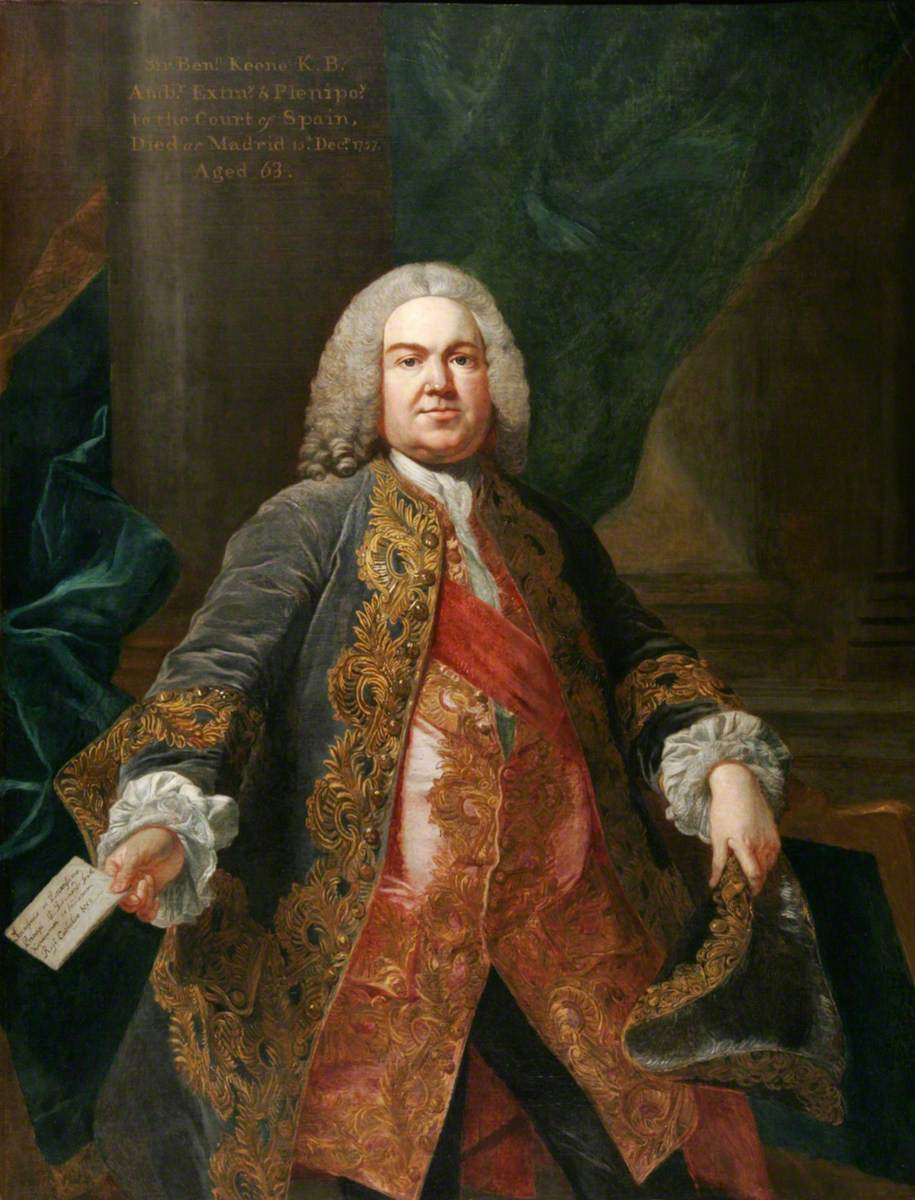
- Portrait after Louis-Michel van Loo

British ambassador to Spain
- In office 1749–1757
- Monarch: George II
- Preceded by: Vacant War of Jenkins' Ear
- Succeeded by: Earl of Bristol

British ambassador to Portugal
- In office 1745–1749
- Preceded by: Charles Crompton
- Succeeded by: Abraham Castres

MP for West Looe
- In office 1741–1747

MP for Maldon
- In office January 1740 – April 1741

British ambassador to Spain
- In office 1729–1739
- Preceded by: Anglo-Spanish War
- Succeeded by: War of Jenkins' Ear

Personal details
- Born: c. 1697 King's Lynn, Norfolk
- Died: 15 December 1757 (aged 60) Madrid, Spain
- Resting place: St Nicholas's Chapel, Kings Lynn, Norfolk
- Party: Whig
- Parent(s): Charles Keene (1674–?); Susan Rolfe (? – 1753)
- Education: Pembroke College, Cambridge; Leiden University
- Occupation: Diplomat, politician
- Committees: Board of Trade 1741–1744; Paymaster of Pensions 1745–1746

Sir Benjamin Keene (c. 1697 – 15 December 1757) was a British diplomat and Whig politician who served as the British ambassador to Spain from 1729 to 1739, then again from 1748 until his death in Madrid in December 1757. He has been described as "by far the most prominent British agent in Anglo-Spanish relations of the 18th century".

First appointed Consul General to Spain in 1724, he became Ambassador five years later, when he negotiated the 1729 Treaty of Seville ending the 1727 to 1729 Anglo-Spanish War. He later agreed the 1739 Convention of Pardo resolving trade and boundary issues in the Caribbean, but political opposition in England meant it was never ratified, leading to the 1739 to 1748 War of Jenkins' Ear.

On returning to England, he was elected Member of Parliament from 1740 to 1741 for Maldon, then for West Looe until 1747. He was appointed to the Board of Trade in 1741 and made Paymaster of Pensions in 1745; he found political life less interesting than diplomacy and in 1745 transferred to Lisbon as Ambassador to Portugal.

Following the 1748 Treaty of Aix-la-Chapelle, he returned to Madrid where his influence kept Spain neutral when the Seven Years' War began in 1756. His importance was such that he was kept in post until his death in December 1757, despite several requests he be allowed to retire due to ill-health. Although his successor lacked the same influence, Spain did not join the war against Britain until 1762, a major factor in British victory.

== Biography ==
Benjamin Keene was born around 1697 in King's Lynn Norfolk, eldest son of Charles Keene (1675–?) and Susan Rolfe (?–1753). His younger brother Edmund (1714–1781) was Bishop of Ely, and later Master of Peterhouse, Cambridge.

Both his father and uncle Benjamin served as Mayor of King's Lynn, as did his grandfather Edmund Rolfe (1640–1726). Rolfe was also election agent for Sir Robert Walpole, British Prime Minister from 1721 to 1742; this connection helped the careers of both Benjamin and his younger brother.

Keene was unmarried and left his estate to his brother Edmund; his nephew Benjamin (1753–1837) was MP for Cambridge from 1774 to 1786.

== Career ==
=== 1718 to 1746 ===
Keene graduated from Pembroke College, Cambridge in 1718 and completed his legal studies at the Dutch university of Leiden. Family connections brought him to the notice of Secretary of State and Norfolk magnate, Viscount Townshend (1674–1738), who sent him to Madrid in 1723, first as an officer of the South Sea Company, then Consul from 1724.

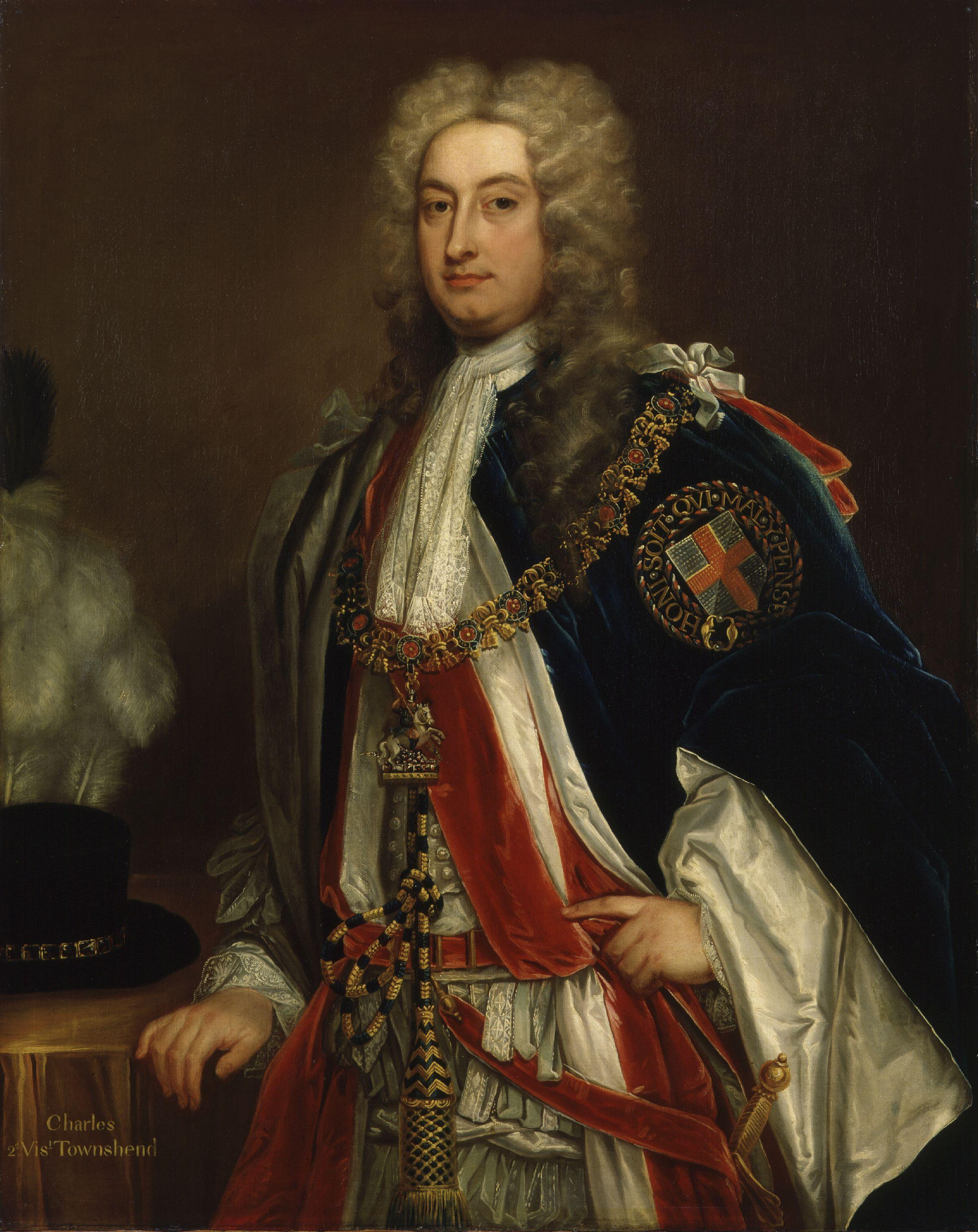
Viscount Townshend (1674–1738) who spotted Keene's talents and sent him to Madrid in 1723

The South Sea Company was established to hold commercial rights awarded to Britain in the 1713 Treaty of Utrecht, allowing access to the closed markets of Spanish America. They included the Asiento de Negros to supply 5,000 slaves a year and Navío de Permiso, permitting limited direct sales in Porto Bello and Veracruz. The company was acquired by the British government after going bankrupt in the 1720 'South Sea Bubble' and became a state enterprise.

The asiento itself was marginally profitable and has been described as a 'commercial illusion'; between 1717 and 1733, only eight ships were sent from Britain to the Americas. The real benefit was in carrying smuggled goods that evaded customs duties, demand from Spanish colonists creating a large and profitable black market. There was also a significant legitimate trade; British goods were imported through Cádiz, either for sale locally or re-exported to the colonies, Spanish dye and wool going the other way. In 1743, a leading City of London merchant called the trade "the best Flower in our Garden."

The Spanish resented being forced to open their colonial markets, partly due to the prevailing economic theory of mercantilism, which viewed trade as a finite resource. This meant an increase in Britain's share was at the expense of Spain's and wars were often fought over commercial issues. Utrecht had also confirmed British possession of the Spanish ports of Gibraltar and Mahón; their desire to regain them was a factor in the 1718 to 1720 War of the Quadruple Alliance, as well Spanish support for the Jacobite rising of 1719. This made the post of British Consul highly important, held by someone of skill and intelligence.

Keene's first major role was to negotiate the Treaty of Seville, ending the 1727 to 1729 Anglo-Spanish War; credit for the treaty was taken by William Stanhope, who returned from two years absence in London for the purpose. He also negotiated the 1739 Convention of El Pardo, an attempt to prevent war between the two states; the terms were denounced by British merchants, and never ratified.

With the outbreak of the War of Jenkins' Ear in 1739, he returned to London, and was elected Member of Parliament for Maldon. Part of Henry Pelham's Whig administration, he was re-elected for West Looe in 1741; from 1741 to 1744, he was a member of the Board of Trade, then Paymaster of Pensions from 1745 to 1746.

=== 1746 to 1757 ===
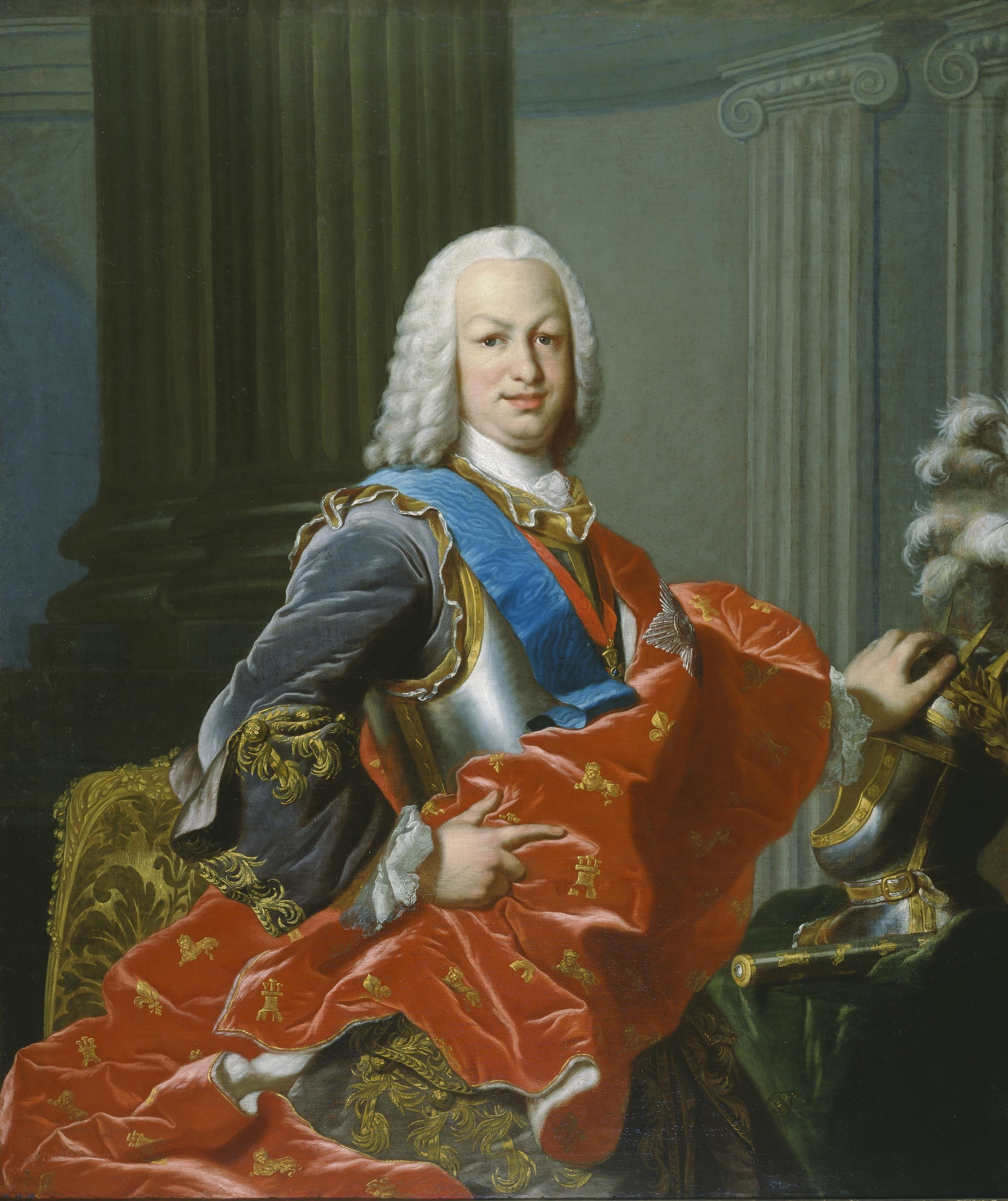
Ferdinand VI, who had a strong relationship with Keene

In July 1746, French-born Philip V of Spain died and was succeeded by Ferdinand VI, who was more pro-British than his predecessor. British foreign policy was overseen by Pelham's younger brother, the Duke of Newcastle, who saw this as an opportunity to break the Bourbon alliance, and improve Britain's position in the War of the Austrian Succession.

Keene's personal correspondence shows he did not enjoy Parliamentary life, and he was happy to be appointed Ambassador to Portugal in 1745. Since Britain and Spain were still at war, his role in Lisbon was to open negotiations with the new Spanish regime, although his talks with the Marqués de Tabuérniga made little progress, largely because Britain refused to consider the return of Gibraltar.

After the 1748 Treaty of Aix-la-Chapelle ended the war, Keene resumed his position in Madrid; he quickly developed a good relationship with Ferdinand and his ministers, who shared Newcastle's aim of moving Spain away from France and closer to Britain. In October 1750, Keene helped negotiate the Treaty of Madrid, which resolved commercial issues between the two countries.

He also brokered the 1752 Treaty of Aranjuez between Spain, Austria and Sardinia, in which the three countries agreed to recognise each other's boundaries in Italy. In 1754 he helped remove the pro-French Marquis of Ensenada, who was replaced as prime minister by Ricardo Wall, former Spanish ambassador in London. His achievements were recognised with the award of the Order of the Bath by George II, presented to him by Ferdinand at a special ceremony.

Although Newcastle failed to prevent the 1756 Diplomatic Revolution, in which Austria allied with France, Spain initially stayed out of the Seven Years' War. Keene was now in poor health, but his request to be relieved was rejected since he was considered too valuable to British interests. He died in Madrid in 1757, and was replaced by George Hervey, 2nd Earl of Bristol, who did not have the same influence; Charles III of Spain succeeded Ferdinand in 1759, and in 1762 he entered the war on the side of France.

== Legacy ==
The town of Keene in New Hampshire was named after him in 1753.

== Sources ==
- Anderson, MS (1976). Europe in the Eighteenth Century, 1713–1783 : (A General History of Europe). Longman. ISBN 978-0582486720.
- Browning, Reed (1993). The War of the Austrian Succession. St. Martin's Press. ISBN 978-0312094836.
- Ewing, William Creasey (1837). Norfolk lists, from the Reformation to the present time. Matchett, Stevenson, Matchett.
- Ibañez, Ignacio Rivas (2008). Mobilizing Resources for War: The Intelligence Systems during the War of Jenkins' Ear (PDF) (PHD). University College London.
- Lodge, Richard (1932). "Presidential Address: Sir Benjamin Keene, K.B.: A Study in Anglo-Spanish Relations in the Earlier Part of the Eighteenth Century". Transactions of the Royal Historical Society. 15: 1–43. doi:10.2307/3678642. JSTOR 3678642.
- Mclachlan, Jean O (1940). Trade and Peace with Old Spain (2015 ed.). Cambridge University Press. ISBN 978-1107585614.
- Mercer, M (2004). "Keene, Sir Benjamin". Oxford Dictionary of National Biography (online ed.). Oxford University Press. doi:10.1093/ref:odnb/15245. (Subscription, Wikipedia Library access or UK public library membership required.)
- Namier, Lewis; Brooke, J, eds. (1964). KEENE, Benjamin (1753–1837), of Westoe Lodge, Cambs in The History of Parliament: the House of Commons 1754–1790 (Online ed.). Boydell & Brewer.
- Richard Lodge, The Private Correspondence of Sir Benjamin Keene. In: The English Historical Review, Vol. 49, No. 194 (Apr. 1934), pp. 344–45
- Richmond, Herbert William (1920). The navy in the war of 1739–48. The Cambridge Naval and Military Series. Vol. 1. Cambridge University Press. ISBN 9781107611641.
- Rodger, N. A. M., The Insatiable Earl: A Life of John Montagu, Fourth Earl of Sandwich, 1718–1792. Harper Collins, 1993
- Rothbard, Murray. "Mercantilism as the Economic Side of Absolutism". Mises.org.
- Schumann, Matt. "British Foreign Policy During the Seven Years' War (1749-63)". Gale.com.
- Sedgwick, R, ed. (1970). KEENE, Benjamin (c.1697–1757) in The History of Parliament: the House of Commons 1715–1754 (Online ed.). Boydell & Brewer.
- Scott, Hamish (2015). The Birth of a Great Power System, 1740-1815. Routledge. ISBN 978-1-138-13423-2.
- Simms, Brendan (2008). Three Victories and a Defeat: The Rise and Fall of the First British Empire. Penguin Books.

Parliament of Great Britain
Preceded by Henry Parsons	Member of Parliament for Maldon; 1740 to 1741; With: Martin Bladen	Succeeded by Sir Thomas Drury; Robert Colebrooke
Preceded by John Strange; John Owen	Member of Parliament for West Looe; 1741 to 1747; With: Admiral Sir Charles Wager	Succeeded by Sir John Frederick; William Noel
