= War of Jenkins' Ear =

1739–1748 conflict between Britain and Spain

- Part of War of the Austrian Succession
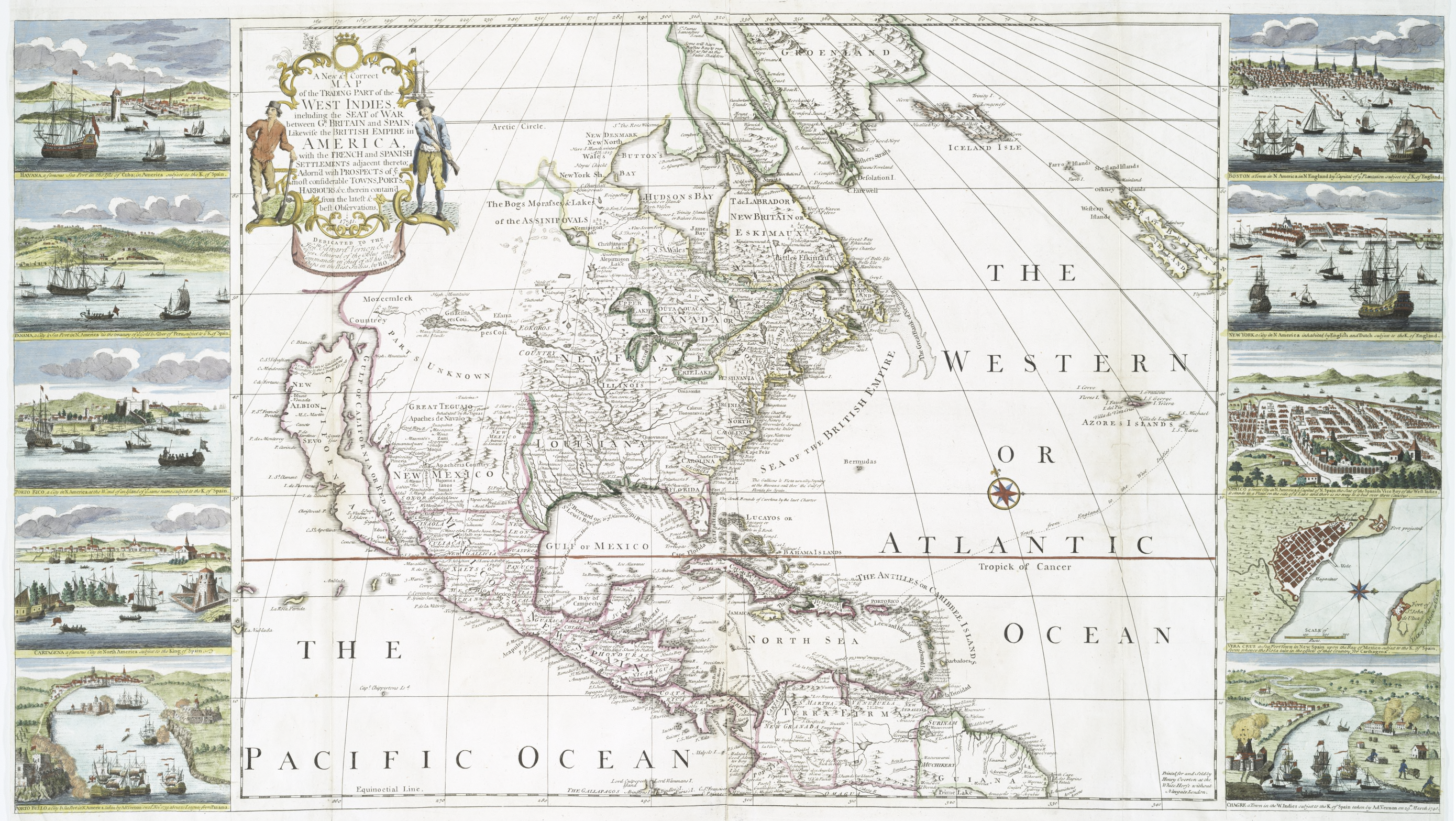
- 1741 map of the West Indies and North America
Date	22 October 1739 – 18 October 1748 (8 years, 11 months and 26 days)
Location	New Granada and the Caribbean; Spanish Florida–Province of Georgia; Pacific and Atlantic
Result	Treaty of Aix-la-Chapelle
Territorial changes	Status quo ante bellum

Belligerents
Great Britain; Province of Georgia; Colony of Virginia	Spain; Province of Cartagena; Province of Portobelo; Province of Venezuela; Province of Florida

Commanders and leaders
Sir Robert Walpole; Lord Wilmington; Henry Pelham; Edward Vernon; Chaloner Ogle; George Anson; Charles Knowles; Thomas Wentworth; James Oglethorpe; Lord Cathcart #	Philip V; Ferdinand VI; Sebastián de Eslava; Blas de Lezo; Manuel de Montiano; Andrés Reggio

Casualties and losses
c. 20,000 dead or wounded	c. 10,000 dead or wounded

The War of Jenkins' Ear (Note: Spanish: Guerra del Asiento, lit. 'War of the Agreement') was fought between Great Britain and Spain from 1739 to 1748. Most of the fighting took place in New Granada and the Caribbean Sea, with major operations over by 1742. It is considered a related conflict of the 1740 to 1748 War of the Austrian Succession.

The name derives from Robert Jenkins, a British sea captain whose ear was allegedly severed in April 1731 by the captain of a Spanish guarda costa searching his ship for contraband. In 1738, opposition politicians in the British Parliament used the incident to incite support for a war against Spain.

The most significant operation of the war was a failed British attack on Cartagena in 1741, which resulted in heavy casualties and ship losses, and was not repeated. Apart from minor actions in Spanish Florida, Georgia, and Havana, after 1742 Britain and Spain focused their efforts on the War of the Austrian Succession in Europe.

Fighting formally ended with the 1748 Treaty of Aix-la-Chapelle, the terms of which meant Britain largely failed to achieve its original territorial and economic ambitions in the Americas. The war is significant in British naval history for George Anson's voyage around the world from 1740 to 1744.

== Background ==
While the conflict is often portrayed as a trade dispute, modern historians argue Spanish concerns over British colonial expansion in North America were equally important. They also suggest a decisive factor in the path to war was the campaign by the Tory opposition, who sought to remove the Whig government led by Robert Walpole, Prime Minister since 1721.

The 1713 Treaty of Utrecht gave British merchants access to markets in Spanish America, including the Asiento de Negros, a monopoly to supply 5,000 slaves a year. Another was the Navío de Permiso, permitting two ships a year to sell 500 tons of goods each in Porto Bello in Panama, and Veracruz in Mexico. Both concessions were held by the South Sea Company, owned by the British government since 1720, although their value was insignificant compared to the trade between Britain and mainland Spain.

The asiento itself has been described as a 'commercial illusion', with only eight ships in total sent from Britain between 1718 and 1733. Even for these, their primary purpose was to transport consumer goods that evaded customs duties. High tariffs on imported goods, combined with demand from local colonists, made smuggling too lucrative to be stopped. The Spanish therefore tried to either manage the illegal trade, or use it as an instrument of policy. During the Anglo-Spanish War (1727–1729), French ships were allowed through but British ones stopped, a policy reversed when Britain backed Spain in the 1733 to 1735 War of the Polish Succession.

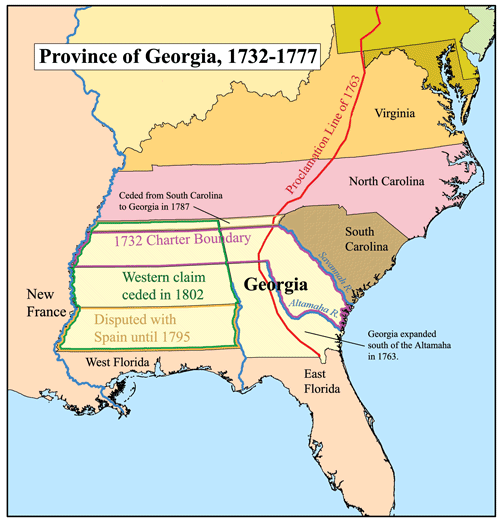
The establishment of Georgia in 1733 raised tensions by threatening Spanish possessions in the Caribbean Basin.

Under the 1729 Treaty of Seville, the Spanish were allowed to check British vessels trading with the Americas for contraband. In 1731, the brig Rebecca was found to be carrying smuggled sugar, its captain Robert Jenkins later alleging his ear was partially amputated during the search by Spanish customs officers. While deprecating such treatment, the Royal Naval commander in Port Royal argued those involved in "clandestine trade" could not complain if their cargoes were confiscated, and often used violence themselves.

Tensions increased after the founding of the British colony of Georgia in 1732, seen as a threat to Spanish Florida, vital to protect shipping routes with mainland Spain. For their part, the British viewed the 1733 Pacte de Famille between Louis XV of France and Philip V of Spain as the first step in being replaced by France as Spain's largest trading partner. A second round of Spanish "depredations" in 1738 led to demands for compensation, with Tory-backed newsletters and pamphlets presenting them as being inspired by France. In London, opposition newspapers—particularly the essay-paper The Champion—ran serial columns (“Index to the Times” and “Journal of the War”) that criticised naval preparation and ministerial conduct during the opening phase of the war. In support of their campaign against Walpole, the Tories exhibited Jenkins in the House of Commons, at which point the incident was widely publicised.

The January 1739 Convention of Pardo established a Commission to resolve the Georgia-Florida boundary dispute. It also agreed Spain would compensate British merchants for damages, while the South Sea Company would pay Philip V his share of profits on the asiento, but the company refused to comply. As a result, George II declared war on 15 June, a decision formally ratified by Parliament on 23 October. On 20 July, a naval force under Admiral Edward Vernon sailed for the West Indies, and reached Antigua in early October.

== Conduct of the war ==
=== First attack on La Guaira (22 October 1739) ===
On 22 October, Vernon sent three ships commanded by Captain Thomas Waterhouse to intercept Spanish ships between La Guaira and Porto Bello. He decided to attack a number of vessels that he observed at La Guaira, which was controlled by the Royal Guipuzcoan Company of Caracas. The governor of the Province of Venezuela, Brigadier Don Gabriel de Zuloaga had prepared the port defences, and Spanish troops were well-commanded by Captain Don Francisco Saucedo. On 22 October, Waterhouse entered the port of La Guaira flying the Spanish flag. Expecting attack, the port gunners were not deceived by his ruse; they waited until the British squadron was within range and then simultaneously opened fire. After three hours of heavy shelling, Waterhouse ordered a withdrawal. The battered British squadron sailed to Jamaica to undertake emergency repairs. Trying later to explain his actions, Waterhouse argued the capture of a few small Spanish vessels would not have justified the loss of his men.

=== Capture of Portobelo (20–22 November 1739) ===
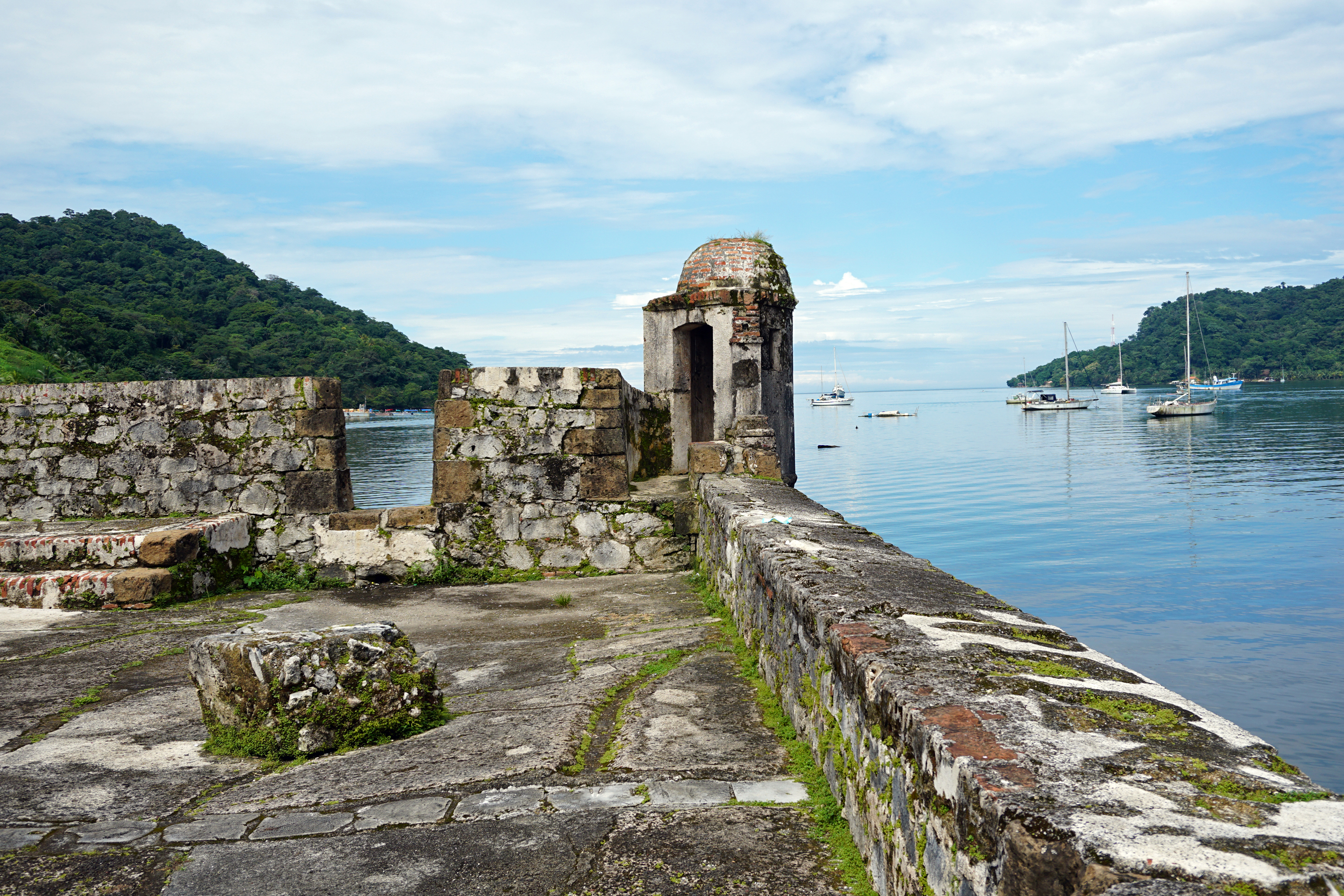
Ruins of the fortress of San Jeronimo, Portobelo

Prior to 1739, trade between mainland Spain and its colonies was conducted only through specific ports; twice a year, outward bound ships assembled in Cádiz and the Flota escorted to Portobelo or Veracruz. One way to impact Spanish trade was by attacking or blockading these ports but as many ships carried cargoes financed by foreign merchants, the strategy also risked damaging British and neutral interests.

During the 1727 to 1729 Anglo-Spanish War, the British attempted to take Portobelo, but retreated after heavy losses from disease. On 22 November 1739, Vernon attacked the port with six ships of the line; it fell within twenty-four hours and the British occupied the town for three weeks before withdrawing, having first destroyed its fortifications, port and warehouses.

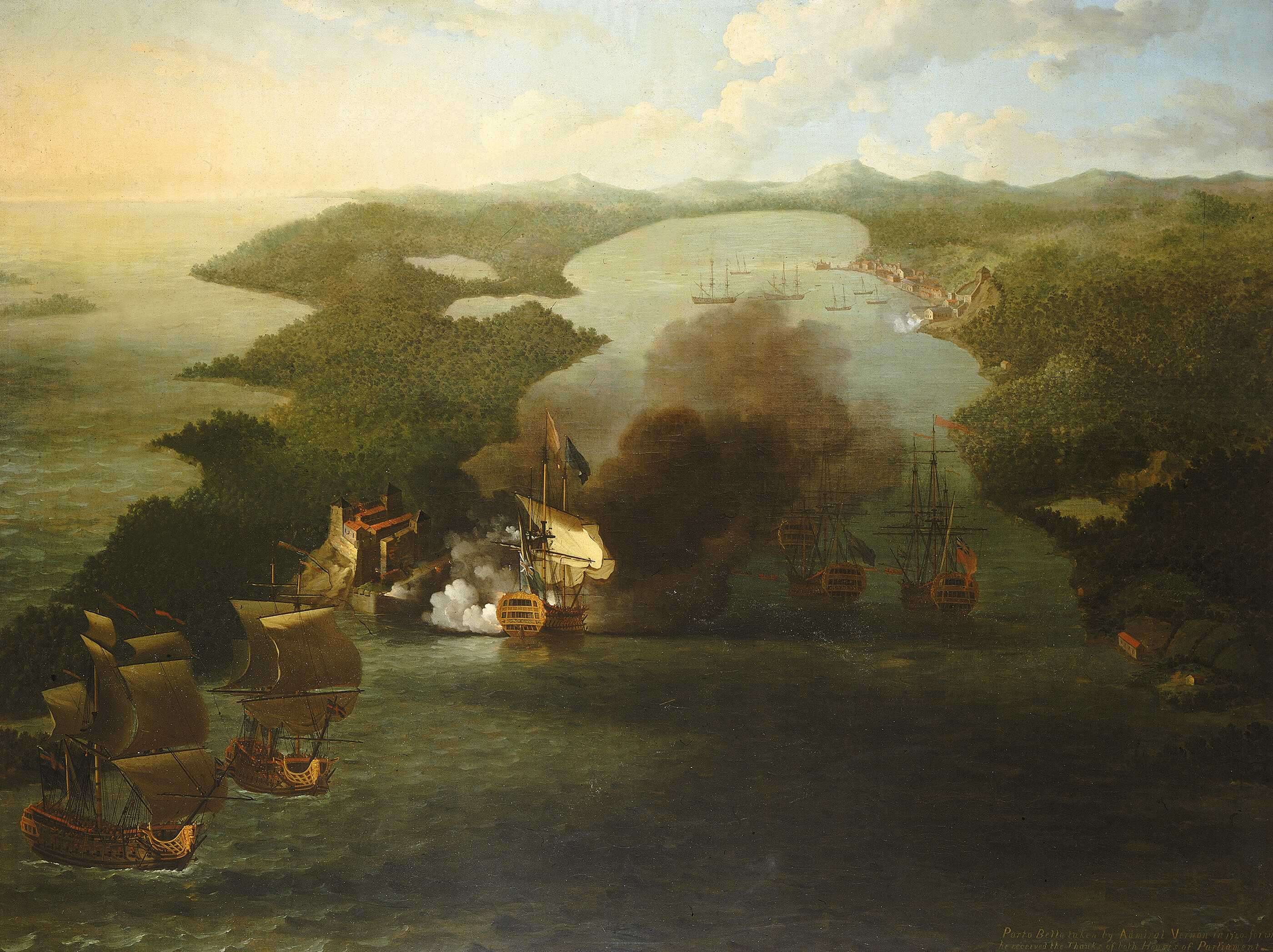
The Capture of Puerto Bello by Samuel Scott, 1740

The victory was widely celebrated in Britain; the famous song "Rule Britannia" was written in 1740 to mark the occasion and performed for the first time at a dinner in London honouring Vernon. The suburb of Portobello in Edinburgh and Portobello Road in London are among the places in Britain named after this success, while more medals were awarded for its capture than any other event in the eighteenth century.

Taking a port in Spain's American empire was considered a foregone conclusion by many Patriot Whigs and opposition Tories. They now pressed a reluctant Walpole to launch larger naval expeditions to the Gulf of Mexico. In the longer term, the Spanish replaced the twice-yearly Flota with a larger number of smaller convoys, calling at more ports and Portobelo's economy did not recover until the building of the Panama Canal nearly two centuries later.

=== First attack on Cartagena de Indias (13–20 March 1740) ===
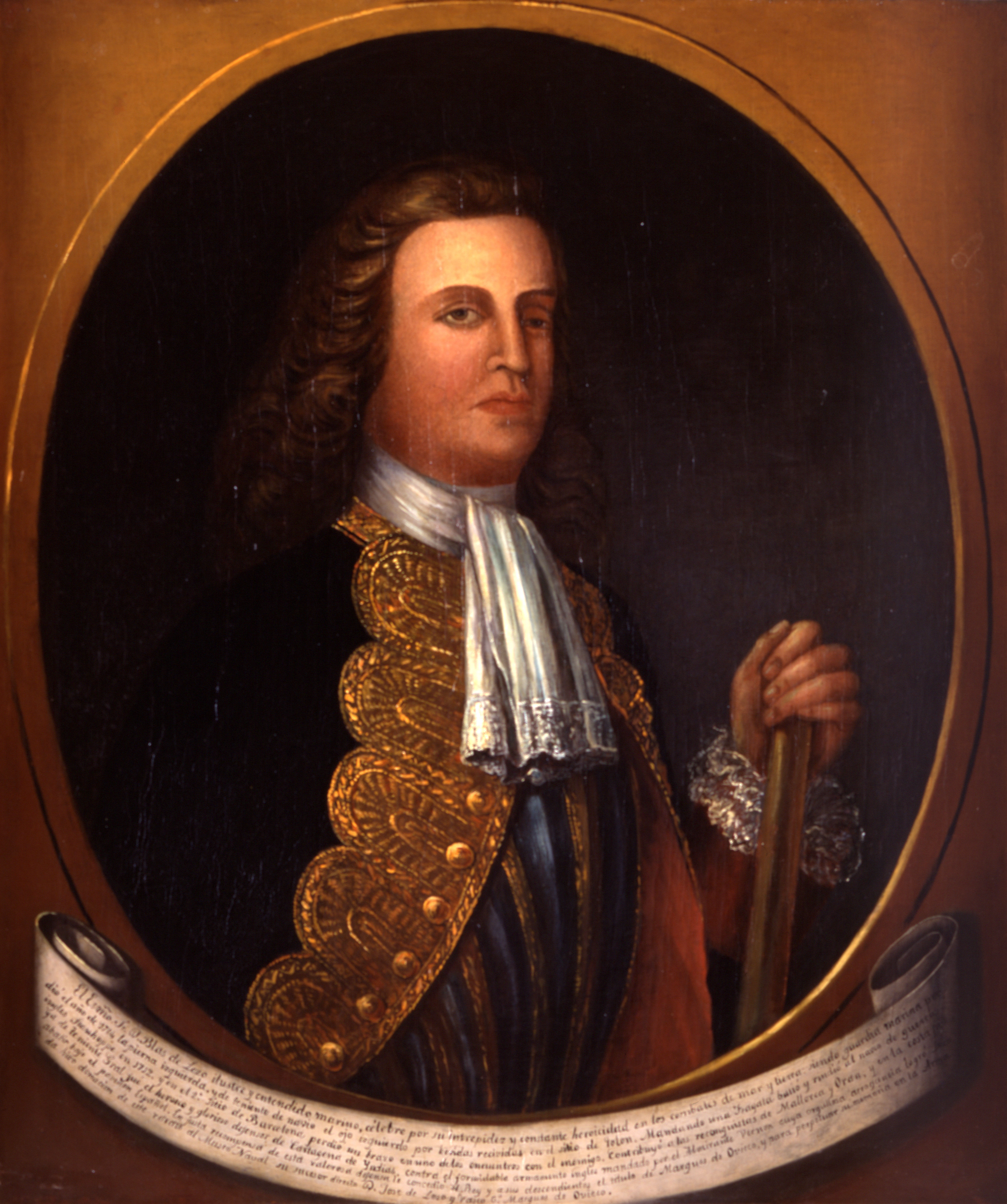
Spanish admiral Don Blas de Lezo 1741

Following the success of Portobelo, Vernon decided to focus his efforts on the capture of Cartagena de Indias in present-day Colombia. Both Vernon and Edward Trelawny, the governor of Jamaica, considered the Spanish gold shipping port to be a prime objective. Since the outbreak of the war and Vernon's arrival in the Caribbean, the British had made a concerted effort to gain intelligence on the defences of Cartagena. In October 1739, Vernon sent First Lieutenant Percival to deliver a letter to Blas de Lezo and Don Pedro Hidalgo, the governor of Cartagena. Percival was to use the opportunity to make a detailed study of the Spanish defences. This effort was thwarted when Percival was denied entry to the port.

On 7 March 1740, in a more direct approach, Vernon undertook a reconnaissance-in-force of the Spanish city. Vernon left Port Royal in command of a squadron including ships of the line, two fire ships, three bomb vessels, and transport ships. Reaching Cartagena on 13 March, Vernon immediately landed several men to map the topography and to reconnoitre the Spanish squadron anchored in Playa Grande, west of Cartagena. Having not seen any reaction from the Spanish, on 18 March Vernon ordered the three bomb vessels to open fire on the city. He sought to provoke a response that might give him a better idea of the defensive capabilities of the Spanish. Understanding Vernon's motives, Lezo did not immediately respond. Instead, he ordered the removal of guns from some of his ships in order to form a temporary shore battery for the purpose of suppressive fire. Vernon next launched an amphibious assault, but in the face of strong resistance, the attempt to land 400 soldiers was unsuccessful. The British then undertook a three-day naval bombardment of the city. In total, the campaign lasted 21 days. Vernon then withdrew his forces, leaving HMS Windsor Castle and HMS Greenwich in the vicinity, with the mission to intercept any Spanish ship that might approach.

=== Destruction of the fortress of San Lorenzo el Real Chagres (22–24 March 1740) ===
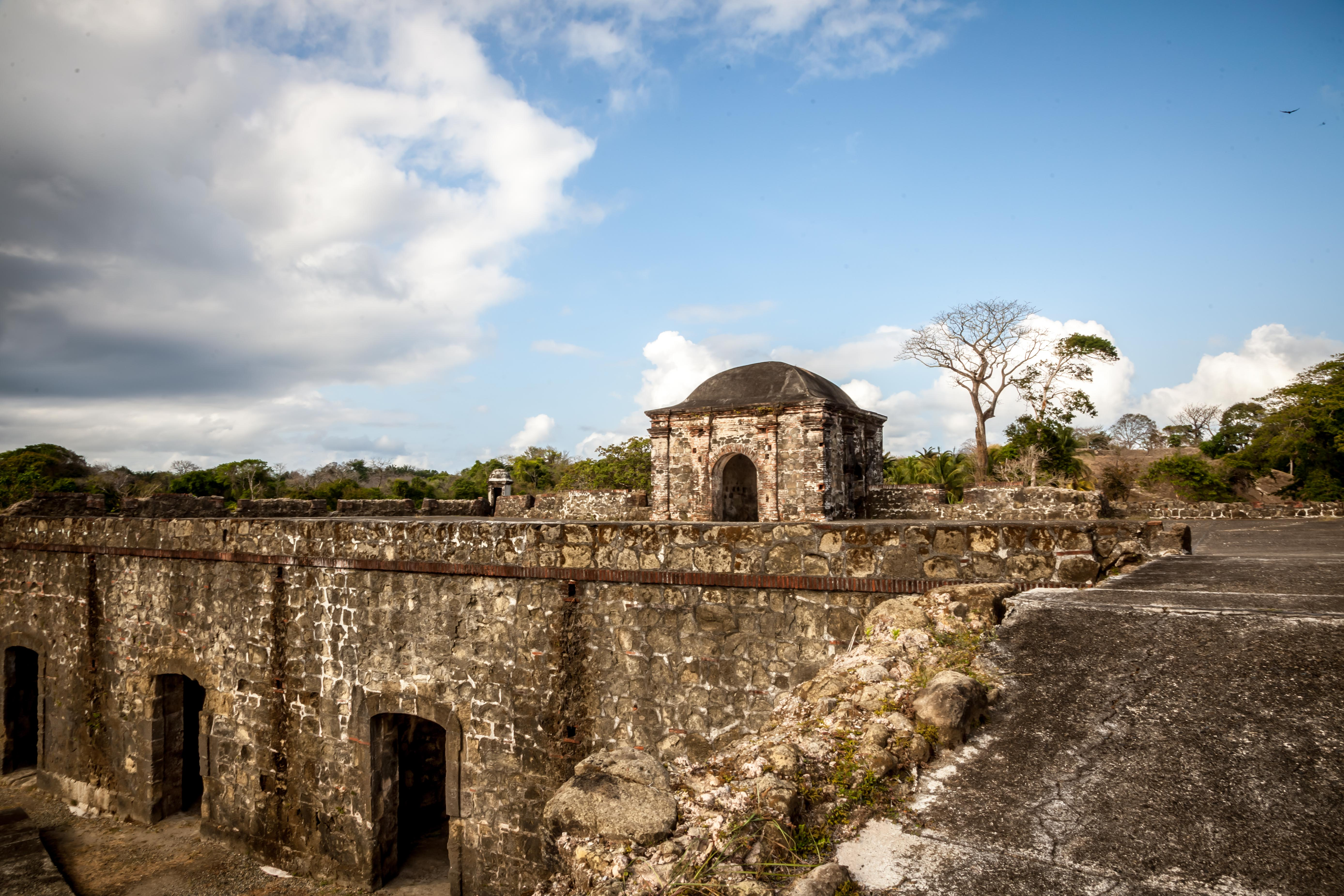
Fortress of San Lorenzo el Real Chagres

After the destruction of Portobelo the previous November, Vernon proceeded to remove the last Spanish stronghold in the area. He attacked the fortress of San Lorenzo el Real Chagres, in present-day Panama on the banks of the Chagres River, near Portobelo. The fort was defended by Spanish patrol boats, and was armed with four guns and about thirty soldiers under Captain of Infantry Don Juan Carlos Gutiérrez Cevallos.

At 3 pm on 22 March 1740, the British squadron, composed of the ships Strafford, Norwich, Falmouth and Princess Louisa, the frigate Diamond, the bomb vessels Alderney, Terrible, and Cumberland, the fireships Success and Eleanor, and transports Goodly and Pompey, under command of Vernon, began to bombard the Spanish fortress. Given the overwhelming superiority of the British forces, Captain Cevallos surrendered the fort on 24 March, after resisting for two days.

Following the strategy previously applied at Porto Bello, the British destroyed the fort and seized the guns along with two Spanish patrol boats.

During this period of British victories along the Caribbean coast, events in Spain would prove to have a significant effect on the outcome of the largest engagement of the war. Spain had decided to replace Don Pedro Hidalgo as governor of Cartagena de Indias. But the new governor-designate, Lieutenant General of the Royal Armies Sebastián de Eslava y Lazaga, had first to evade the Royal Navy in order to get to his new post. Galicia and San Carlos set sail from the Galician port of Ferrol. Hearing the news, Vernon immediately sent four ships to intercept the Spanish. They were unsuccessful. The Spanish reached the port of Cartagena on 21 April 1740, landing there with the new governor and several hundred veteran soldiers.

=== Second attack on Cartagena de Indias (3 May 1740) ===
In May, Vernon returned to Cartagena de Indias aboard the flagship HMS Princess Caroline in charge of 13 warships, with the intention of bombarding the city. Lezo reacted by deploying his six ships of the line so that the British fleet was forced into ranges where they could only make short or long shots that were of little value. Vernon withdrew, asserting that the attack was merely a manoeuver. The main consequence of this action was to help the Spanish test their defences. A very similar operation had taken place in March. In that moment Vernon sounded several beaches, bombarded Cartagena and then withdrew.

=== Third attack on Cartagena de Indias (13 March–20 May 1741) ===
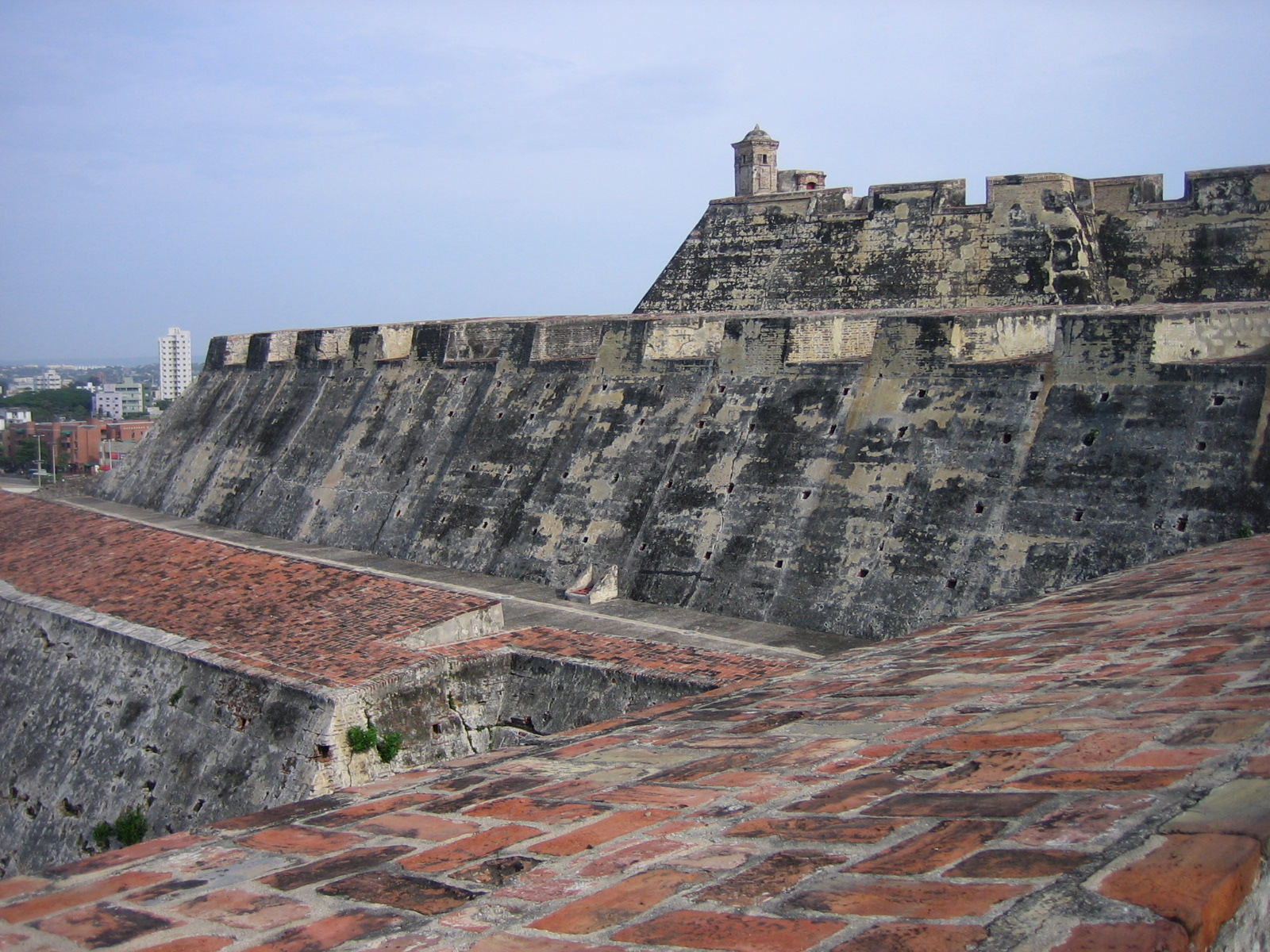
Castillo San Felipe de Barajas (Cartagena). This fortress, though incomplete during the war, was integral to Spain's effort to maintain the link with its colonies via the Atlantic sea lanes.

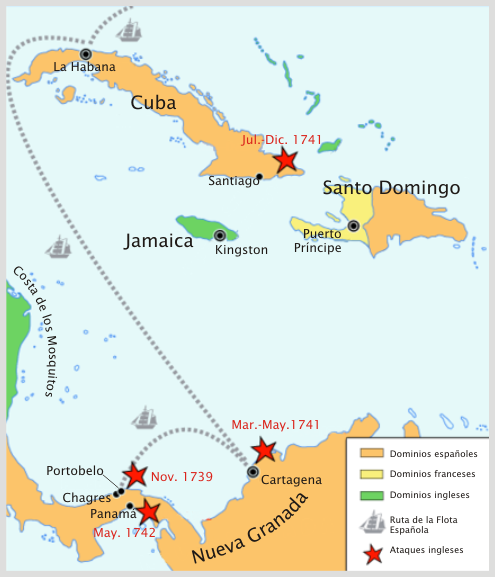
British operations in the Caribbean Sea during the War of Jenkins' Ear

The largest action of the war was a major amphibious attack launched by the British under Admiral Edward Vernon in March 1741 against Cartagena de Indias, one of Spain's principal gold-trading ports in their colony of New Granada (today Colombia). Vernon's expedition was hampered by inefficient organisation, his rivalry with the commander of his land forces, and the logistical problems of mounting and maintaining a major trans-Atlantic expedition. The strong fortifications in Cartagena and the able strategy of Spanish Commander Blas de Lezo were decisive in repelling the attack. Heavy losses on the British side were due in large part to virulent tropical diseases, primarily an outbreak of yellow fever, which took more lives than were lost in battle.

The extreme ease with which the British destroyed Porto Bello led to a change in British plans. Instead of Vernon concentrating his next attack on Havana as expected, in order to conquer Cuba, he planned to attack Cartagena de Indias. Located in Colombia, it was the main port of the Viceroyalty and main point of the West Indian fleet for sailing to the Iberian Peninsula. In preparation the British gathered in Jamaica one of the largest fleets ever assembled. It consisted of 186 ships (60 more than the famous Spanish Armada of Philip II), bearing 2,620 artillery pieces and more than 27,000 men. Of that number, 10,000 were soldiers responsible for initiating the assault. There were also 12,600 sailors, 1,000 Jamaican slaves and macheteros, 4,000 recruits from British America, 400 of which were from Virginia. The latter were led by Lawrence Washington, the older half-brother of George Washington, future President of the United States.

Colonial officials assigned Admiral Blas de Lezo to defend the fortified city. He was a marine veteran hardened by numerous naval battles in Europe, beginning with the War of the Spanish Succession, and by confrontations with European pirates in the Caribbean Sea and Pacific Ocean, and Barbary pirates in the Mediterranean Sea. Assisting in that effort were Melchor de Navarrete and Carlos Desnaux, with a squadron of six ships of the line (the flagship vessel Galicia together with the San Felipe, San Carlos, África, Dragón, and Conquistador) and a force of 3,000 soldiers, 600 militia and a group of native Indian archers.

Vernon ordered his forces to clear the port of all scuttled ships. On 13 March 1741, he landed a contingent of troops under command of Major General Thomas Wentworth and artillery to take Fort de San Luis de Bocachica. In support of that action, the British ships simultaneously opened with cannon fire, at a rate of 62 shots per hour. In turn, Lezo ordered four of the Spanish ships to aid 500 of his troops defending Desnaux's position, but the Spanish eventually had to retire to the city. Civilians were already evacuating it. After leaving Fort Bocagrande, the Spanish regrouped at Fort San Felipe de Barajas, while Washington's Virginians took up positions in the nearby hill of La Popa. Vernon, believing the victory at hand, sent a message to Jamaica stating that he had taken the city. The report was subsequently forwarded to London, where there was much celebration. Commemorative medals were minted, depicting the defeated Spanish defenders kneeling before Vernon. The robust image of the enemy depicted in the British medals bore little resemblance to Admiral Lezo. Maimed by years of battle, he was one-eyed with limited use of one hand.

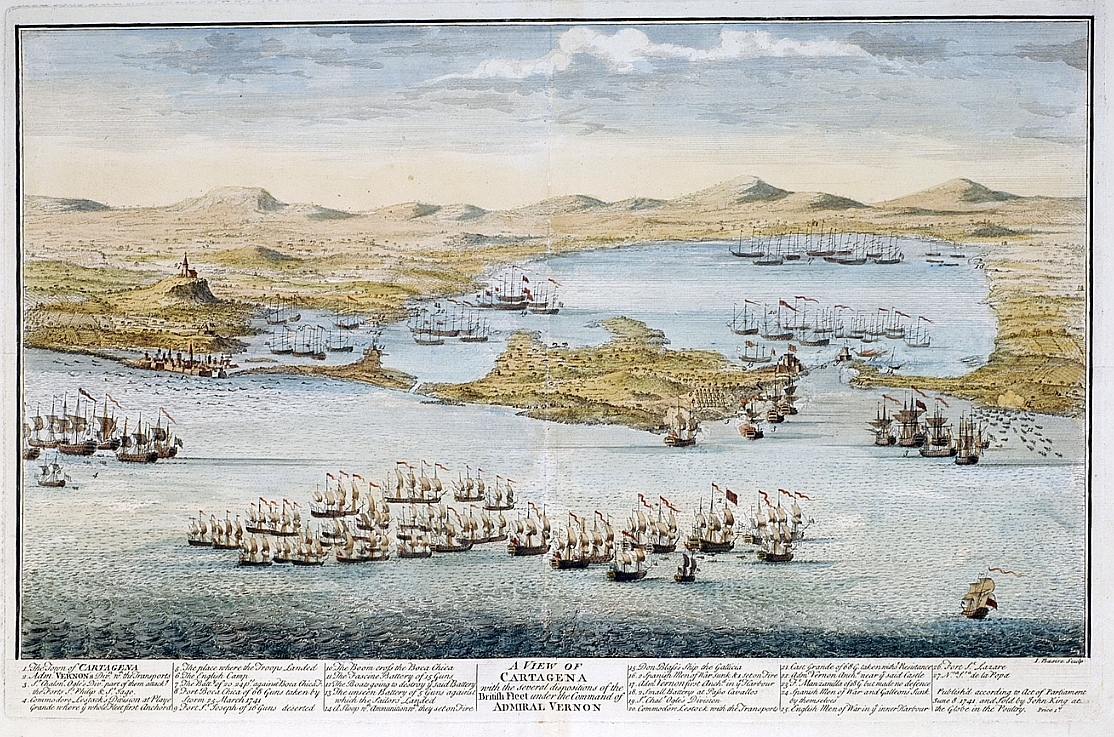
British and American colonial troops led by Admiral Vernon failed to take Cartagena de Indias in 1741.

On the evening of 19 April, the British mounted an assault in force upon Castillo San Felipe de Barajas. Three columns of grenadiers, supported by Jamaicans and several British companies, moved under cover of darkness, with the aid of an intense naval bombardment. The British fought their way to the base of the fort's ramparts where they discovered that the Spanish had dug deep trenches. This effectively rendered the British scaling equipment too short for the task. The British advance was stymied since the fort's walls had not been breached, and the ramparts could not be topped. Neither could the British easily withdraw in the face of intense Spanish fire and under the weight of their own equipment. The Spanish seized on this opportunity, with devastating effect.

Reversing the tide of battle, the Spanish initiated a fixed bayonet charge at first light, inflicting heavy casualties on the British. The surviving British forces retreated to the safety of their ships. The British maintained a naval bombardment, sinking what remained of the small Spanish squadron (after Lezo's decision to scuttle some of his ships in an effort to block the harbour entrance). The Spanish thwarted any British attempt to land another ground assault force. The British troops were forced to remain aboard ship for a month, without sufficient reserves. With supplies running low, and with the outbreak of disease (primarily yellow fever), which took the lives of many on the crowded ships, Vernon was forced to raise the siege on 9 May and return to Jamaica. Six thousand British died while only one thousand Spanish perished.

Vernon carried on, successfully attacking the Spanish at Guantánamo Bay, Cuba. On 5 March 1742, with the help of reinforcements from Europe, he launched an assault on Panama City, Panama. In 1742, Vernon was replaced by Rear-Admiral Chaloner Ogle and returned to England, where he gave an accounting to the Admiralty. He learned that he had been elected MP for Ipswich. Vernon maintained his naval career for another four years before retiring in 1746. In an active parliamentary career, Vernon advocated for improvements in naval procedures. He continued to hold an interest in naval affairs until his death in 1757.

News of the defeat at Cartagena was a significant factor in the downfall of the British Prime Minister Robert Walpole. Walpole's anti-war views were considered by the Opposition to have contributed to his poor prosecution of the war effort.

The new government under Lord Wilmington wanted to shift the focus of Britain's war effort away from the Americas and into the Mediterranean. Spanish policy, dictated by the queen Elisabeth Farnese of Parma, also shifted to a European focus, to recover lost Spanish possessions in Italy from the Austrians. In 1742, a large British fleet under Nicholas Haddock was sent to try and intercept a Spanish army being transported from Barcelona to Italy, which he failed to do having only 10 ships. With the arrival of additional ships from Britain in February 1742, Haddock successfully blockaded the Spanish coast failing to force the Spanish fleet into an action.

Lawrence Washington survived the yellow fever outbreak, and eventually retired to Virginia. He named his estate Mount Vernon, in honour of his former commander.

=== Anson expedition ===
George Anson's capture of the Manila galleon, painted by Samuel Scott before 1772

The success of the Porto Bello operation led the British, in September 1740, to send a squadron under Commodore George Anson to attack Spain's possessions in the Pacific. Before they reached the Pacific, numerous men were killed by disease, they had to outrun pursuing Spanish naval vessels, and ultimately the fleet found itself in no shape to launch any sort of attack. Anson reassembled his force in the Juan Fernández Islands, allowing them to recuperate before he moved up the Chilean coast, raiding the small town of Paita. He reached Acapulco too late to intercept the yearly Manila galleon, which had been one of the principal objectives of the expedition. He retreated across the Pacific, running into a storm that forced him to dock for repairs in Canton. After this he tried again the following year to intercept the Manila galleon. He accomplished this on 20 June 1743 off Cape Espiritu Santo, capturing more than a million gold coins.

Anson sailed home, arriving in London more than three and a half years after he had set out, having circumnavigated the globe in the process. Less than a tenth of his forces had survived the expedition. Anson's achievements helped establish his name and wealth in Britain, leading to his appointment as First Lord of the Admiralty. One of his ships, HMS Wager, was presumed lost in the storms round Cape Horn. The survivors would later take part in a sensational public inquiry concerning allegations of mutiny, cannibalism, and murder among the Wager's crew.

=== Florida ===
In 1740, the inhabitants of Georgia launched an overland attack on the fortified city of St. Augustine in Florida, supported by a British naval blockade, but were repelled. The British forces led by James Oglethorpe, the Governor of Georgia, besieged St. Augustine for over a month before retreating, and abandoned their artillery in the process. The failure of the Royal Navy blockade to prevent supplies reaching the settlement was a crucial factor in the collapse of the siege. Oglethorpe began preparing Georgia for an expected Spanish assault. The Battle of Bloody Mose, where the Spanish and free black forces repelled Oglethorpe's forces at Fort Mose, was also a part of the War of Jenkins' Ear.

=== French neutrality ===
When war broke out in 1739, both Britain and Spain expected that France would join the war on the Spanish side. This played a large role in the tactical calculations of the British. If the Spanish and French were to operate together, they would have a superiority of ninety ships of the line. In 1740, there was an invasion scare when it was believed that a French fleet at Brest and a Spanish fleet at Ferrol were about to combine and launch an invasion of England. Although this proved not to be the case, the British kept the bulk of their naval and land forces in or near southern England to act as a deterrent.

Many in the British government were afraid to launch a major offensive against the Spanish, for fear that a major British victory would draw France into the war to protect the balance of power.

=== Invasion of Georgia ===
In 1742, the Spanish launched an attempt to seize the British colony of Georgia. Manuel de Montiano commanded 2,000 troops, who were landed on St Simons Island off the coast. General Oglethorpe rallied the local forces and defeated the Spanish regulars at Bloody Marsh and Gully Hole Creek, forcing them to withdraw. Border clashes between the colonies of Florida and Georgia continued for the next few years, but neither Spain nor Britain undertook offensive operations on the North American mainland.

=== Second attack on La Guaira (2 March 1743) ===
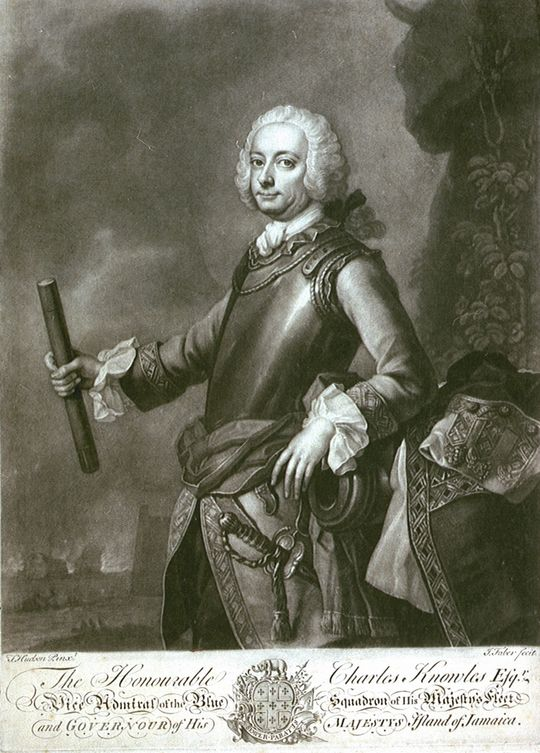
Commodore Charles Knowles in armour; one hand gestures to fortifications and a burning ship.

The British attacked several locations in the Caribbean with little consequence to the geopolitical situation in the Atlantic. The weakened British forces under Vernon launched an attack against Cuba, landing in Guantánamo Bay with a plan to march the 45 miles to Santiago de Cuba and capture the city. Vernon clashed with the army commander, and the expedition withdrew when faced with heavier Spanish opposition than expected. Vernon remained in the Caribbean until October 1742, before heading back to Britain; he was replaced by Admiral Chaloner Ogle, who took command of a sickly fleet. Fewer than half the sailors were fit for duty. The following year, a smaller Royal Navy squadron led by commodore Charles Knowles raided the Venezuelan coast, on 2 March 1743 attacking La Guaira controlled by the Royal Guipuzcoan Company of Caracas whose ships had rendered assistance to the Spanish navy during War in carrying troops, arms, stores and ammunition from Spain to her colonies. Its destruction could have been a severe blow both to the Company and the Spanish Crown.

After a fierce defence by Governor Gabriel José de Zuloaga's troops, Commodore Knowles, having suffered 97 killed and 308 wounded over three days, decided to retire west before sunrise on 6 March. He decided to attack nearby Puerto Cabello. However, despite his orders to rendezvous at Borburata Keys – 4 miles (6.4 km) east of Puerto Cabello – the captains of the detached Burford, Norwich, Assistance, and Otter proceeded to Curaçao. The commodore angrily followed them in. On 28 March, he sent his smaller ships to cruise off Puerto Cabello, and once his main body had been refitted, went to sea again on 31 March. He struggled against contrary winds and currents for two weeks before finally diverting to the eastern tip of Santo Domingo by 19 April.

=== Merger with wider war ===
By mid-1742, the War of the Austrian Succession had broken out in Europe. Principally fought by Prussia and Austria over possession of Silesia, the war soon engulfed most of the major powers of Europe, who joined two competing alliances. The scale of this new war dwarfed any of the fighting in the Americas, and drew Britain and Spain's attention back to operations on the European continent. The return of Vernon's fleet in 1742 marked the end of major offensive operations in the War of Jenkins' Ear. France entered the war in 1744, emphasising the European theatre and planning an ambitious invasion of Britain. While it ultimately failed, the threat persuaded British policymakers of the dangers of sending significant forces to the Americas which might be needed at home.

Britain did not attempt any additional attacks on Spanish possessions. In 1745, William Pepperrell of New England led a colonial expedition, supported by a British fleet under Commodore Peter Warren, against the French fortress of Louisbourg on Cape Breton Island off Canada. Pepperrell was knighted for his achievement, but Britain returned Louisbourg to the French by the Treaty of Aix-La-Chapelle in 1748. A decade later, during the Seven Years' War (known as the French and Indian War in the North American theatre), British forces under Lord Jeffrey Amherst and General Wolfe recaptured it.

=== Privateering ===
The war involved privateering by both sides. Anson captured a valuable Manila galleon, but this was more than offset by the numerous Spanish privateering attacks on British shipping along the transatlantic triangular trade route. They seized hundreds of British ships, looting their goods and slaves, and operated with virtual impunity in the West Indies; they were also active in European waters. The Spanish convoys proved almost unstoppable. During the Austrian phase of the war, the British fleet focused on attacking the poorly protected French merchantmen instead.

=== Lisbon negotiations ===
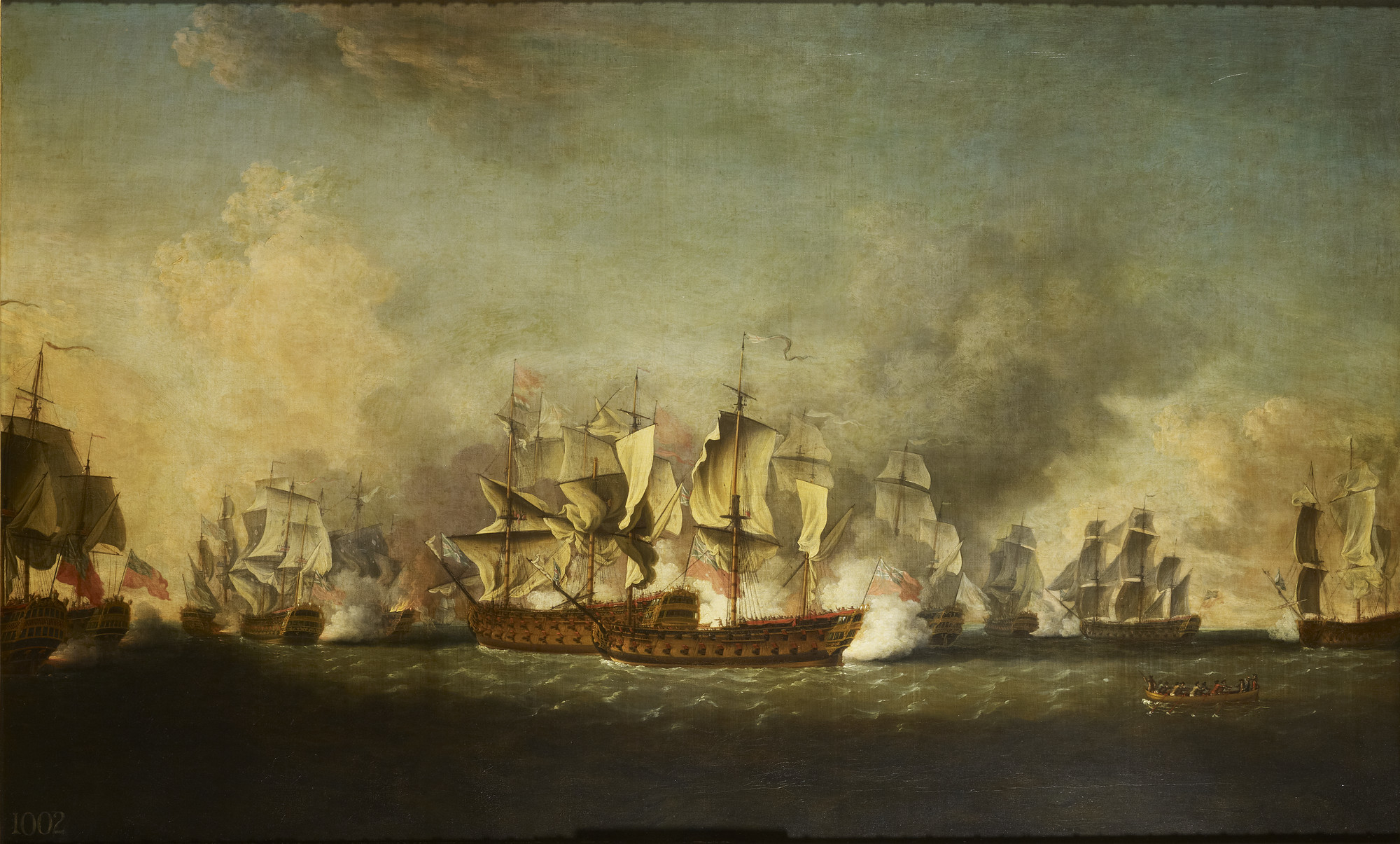
The Spanish and British Caribbean squadrons engage one another during the battle of Havana in 1748.

From August 1746, negotiations began in the city of Lisbon, in neutral Portugal, to try to arrange a peace settlement. The death of Philip V of Spain had brought his son Ferdinand VI to the throne, and he was more willing to be conciliatory over the issues of trade. Because of their commitments to their Austrian allies, the British were unable to agree to Spanish demands for territory in Italy and talks broke down.

== Aftermath ==
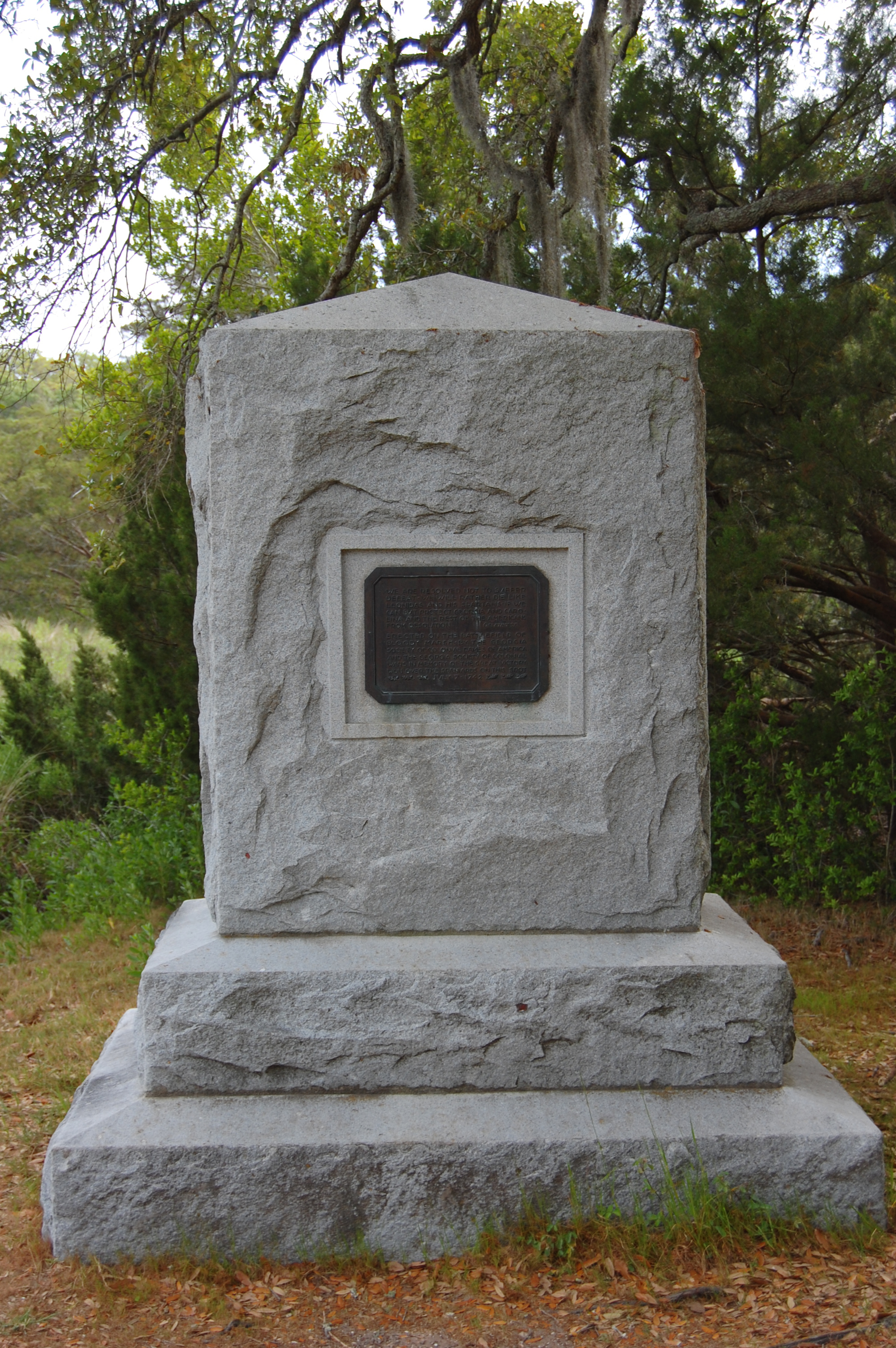
A monument in Georgia commemorating the Battle of Bloody Marsh

The eventual diplomatic resolution formed part of the wider settlement of the War of the Austrian Succession by the Treaty of Aix-la-Chapelle which restored the status quo ante. British territorial and economic ambitions on the Caribbean had been repelled, while Spain, although unprepared at the start of the war, proved successful in defending its American possessions. Moreover, the war put an end to the British smuggling, and the Spanish fleet was able to dispatch three treasure convoys to Europe during the war and off-balance the British squadron at Jamaica. The issue of the asiento was not mentioned in the treaty, as its importance had lessened for both kingdoms. The issue was finally settled by the 1750 Treaty of Madrid in which Britain agreed to renounce its claim to the asiento in exchange for a payment of £100,000. The South Sea Company ceased its activity, although the treaty also allowed favourable conditions for British trade with Spanish America.

George Anson's expedition to the Southeast Pacific led the Spanish authorities in Lima and Santiago to advance the position of the Spanish Empire in the area. Forts were thus built in the Juan Fernández Islands and the Chonos Archipelago in 1749 and 1750.

Following the war, relations between Britain and Spain improved due to a concerted effort by the Duke of Newcastle to cultivate Spain as an ally. In Spain, a succession of Anglophile ministers were appointed, including José de Carvajal and Ricardo Wall, all of whom were on good terms with the British Ambassador Benjamin Keene, and wanted to avoid a repeat of hostilities. As a result, during the first five years of the Seven Years' War between Britain and France, Spain remained neutral. However, fear that the run of French defeats could upset the balance of power led Spain to join the French side, resulting in the losses of Havana and Manila to the British in 1762; although both were returned after the Seven Years' War in exchange for Florida.

The War of Jenkins' Ear is commemorated annually on the last Saturday in May at Wormsloe Plantation in Savannah, Georgia.

== Sources ==
- Anderson, M. S. (1976). Europe in the Eighteenth Century, 1713–1783 (A General History of Europe). Longman. ISBN 978-0582486720.
- Bemis, Samuel Flagg (1965). A Diplomatic History of the United States. Holt, Rinehart and Winston. p. 8.
- Browning, Reed (1975). The Duke of Newcastle. Yale University Press. ISBN 978-0300017465.
- Browning, Reed (1993). The War of the Austrian Succession. St. Martin's Press. ISBN 978-0312094836.
- Clodfelter, M. (2017). Warfare and Armed Conflicts: A Statistical Encyclopedia of Casualty and Other Figures, 1492–2015 (4th ed.). Jefferson, North Carolina: McFarland. ISBN 978-0-7864-7470-7.
- Dewald, Jonathan, ed. (2003). "History 1450–1789". Encyclopedia of the Early Modern World. Charles Scribner's Sons. ISBN 0-684-31200-X.
- Davies, K. G., ed. (1994). Calendar of State Papers, Colonial Series: America and West Indies. HMSO.
- Franklin, Robert (2011). The War of Jenkins' Ear Jingoistic mercantilism, pacifistic diplomacy, and securing of the Georgia border in Phi Alpha Theta Regional Conference (PDF). University of Hawaii.
- Gott, Richard (2005). Cuba: A new history. Yale University Press.
- Graboyes, EM; Hullar, TE (2013). "The War of Jenkins' Ear". Otol Neurotol. 34 (2): 368–372. doi:10.1097/mao.0b013e31827c9f7a. PMC 3711623. PMID 23444484.
- Hakim, Joy (2002). A History of the US. Vol. Book 3: From Colonies to Country 1735–1791. Oxford University Press. ISBN 0-19-515323-5.
- Harbron, John (1998). Trafalgar and the Spanish Navy: The Spanish Experience of Sea Power. Naval Institute Press. ISBN 978-0870216954.
- Harris, Robert (1993). A Patriot Press: National Politics and the London Press in the 1740s. Oxford: Oxford University Press.
- Ibañez, Ignacio Rivas (2008). Mobilizing Resources for War: The Intelligence Systems during the War of Jenkins' Ear (PHD). UCL.
- Laughton, J. K. (1889). "Jenkins's Ear". The English Historical Review. 4 (16): 741–749. JSTOR 546399.
- James, Lawrence (2001). The Rise and Fall of the British Empire. Abacus. ISBN 0-312-16985-X.
- Kenny, Robert W. (1940). "James Ralph: An Eighteenth-Century Philadelphian in Grub Street". The Pennsylvania Magazine of History and Biography. 64 (2): 218–242. JSTOR 20087279.
- Lodge, Richard (1930). Studies in Eighteenth Century Diplomacy 1740–1748. John Murray.
- Lodge, Richard (1933). "Presidential Address: The Treaty of Seville (1729)". Transactions of the Royal Historical Society. 16 (16): 1–43. doi:10.2307/3678662. JSTOR 3678662. S2CID 154733459.
- Longmate, Norman (1990). Defending the Island. London: Grafton Books. ISBN 0-586-20845-3.
- McKay, Derek (1983). The Rise of the Great Powers 1648–1815. Routledge. ISBN 978-0582485549.
- McLachlan, Jean Olivia (1940). Trade and Peace with Old Spain, 1667–1750: A study of the influence of commerce on Anglo-Spanish diplomacy in the first half of the eighteenth century (2015 ed.). Cambridge University Press. ISBN 978-1107585614.
- Morison, Samuel Eliot (1965). The Oxford History of the American People. Oxford University Press.
- Newman, Gerald; Brown, Leslie Ellen; et al., eds. (1997). Britain in the Hanoverian Age, 1714–1837. Taylor & Francis. ISBN 0-8153-0396-3.
- Ogelsby, J. C. M. (1970). "England vs. Spain in America, 1739–1748: the Spanish Side of the Hill". Historical Papers. 5 (1): 147–157. doi:10.7202/030729ar.
- Olson, James (1996). Historical Dictionary of the British Empire. Greenwood. ISBN 0-313-29366-X.
- Pearce, Edward. The Great Man: Sir Robert Walpole Pimlico, 2008.
- Richmond, Herbert (1920). The Navy in the War of 1739–48. War College Series (2015 ed.). War College Series. ISBN 978-1296326296.
- Rodger, Brendan (2005). The Command of the Ocean: A Naval History of Britain 1649–1815. W. W. Norton & Company. ISBN 978-0393060508.
- Rothbard, Murray (23 April 2010). "Mercantilism as the Economic Side of Absolutism". Mises.org.
- Sáez Abad, Rubén (2015). Guerra del asiento o de la oreja de Jenkins 1739–1748 (in Spanish). ALMENA. ISBN 978-8492714094.
- Simms, Brendan (2009). Three Victories and a Defeat: The Rise and Fall of the First British Empire, 1714–1783. Penguin Books. ISBN 978-0140289848.
- Shinsuke, Satsuma (2013). Britain and Colonial Maritime War in the Early Eighteenth Century. Boydell Press. ISBN 978-1843838623.
- Webb, Stephen (2013). Marlborough's America. Yale University Press. ISBN 978-0300178593.
- Woodfine, Philip (1998). Britannia's Glories: The Walpole Ministry and the 1739 War with Spain. Royal Historical Society. ISBN 978-0861932306.
