= Treaty of Seville =

1729 treaty ending the Anglo-Spanish War of 1727–29

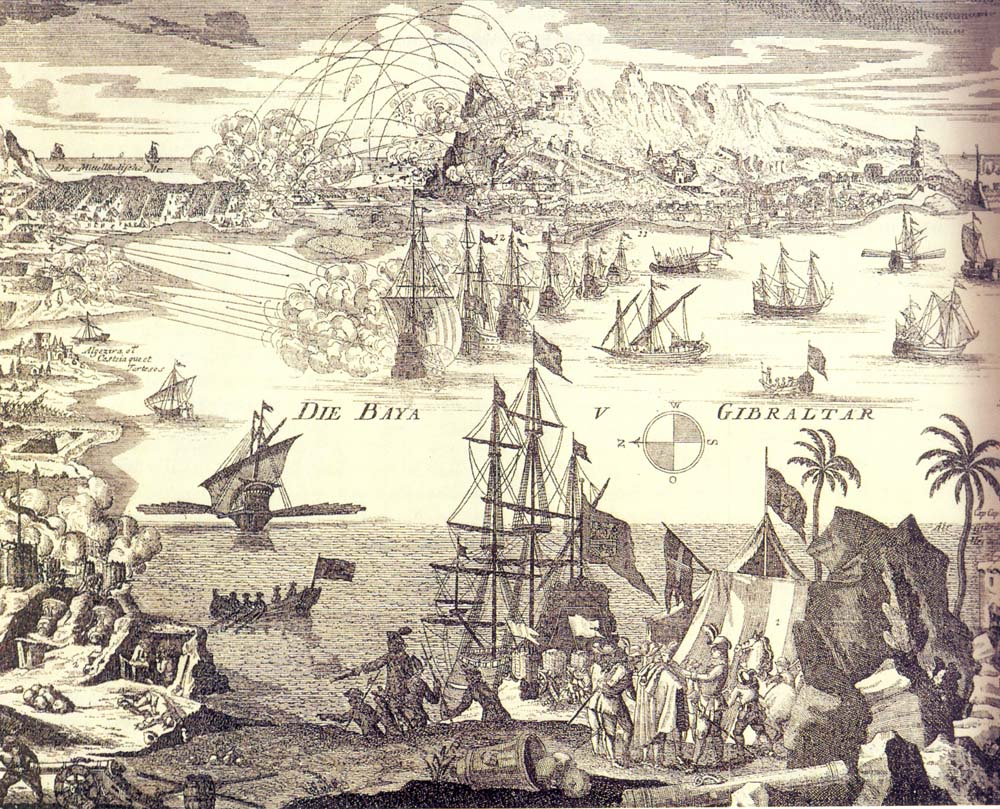
- Contemporary representation of the siege of Gibraltar in 1727
- Context: Restored British and French trading privileges in mainland Spain.; Established an Anglo-Spanish commission to resolve commercial disputes in the Americas.; Confirmed the right of Charles III of Spain to the Duchies of Parma and Tuscany.
- Signed: 9 November 1729
- Location: Seville
- Negotiators: (Kingdom of Great Britain) Benjamin Keene; (Kingdom of Great Britain) William Stanhope
- Signatories: (Kingdom of Great Britain) William Stanhope; (Kingdom of Great Britain) Benjamin Keene; (Spain) Joseph Patiño; (Spain) Marquess de la Paz; (Kingdom of France) Marquis de Brancas
- Parties: Great Britain; Spain; France; Dutch Republic from 29 November

Full text
- Treaty of Seville at Wikisource

The Treaty of Seville was signed on 9 November 1729 between Britain, France, and Spain, formally ending the 1727–1729 Anglo-Spanish War; the Dutch Republic joined the Treaty on 29 November.

However, the Treaty failed to resolve underlying tensions that led first to the War of Jenkins' Ear in 1739, then the wider War of the Austrian Succession in 1740.

== History ==
The Treaty of Seville was signed on 9 November 1729 between Britain, France, and Spain, formally ending the 1727–1729 Anglo-Spanish War; the Dutch Republic joined the Treaty on 29 November.

However, the Treaty failed to resolve underlying tensions that led first to the War of Jenkins' Ear in 1739, then the wider War of the Austrian Succession in 1740.

== Background ==
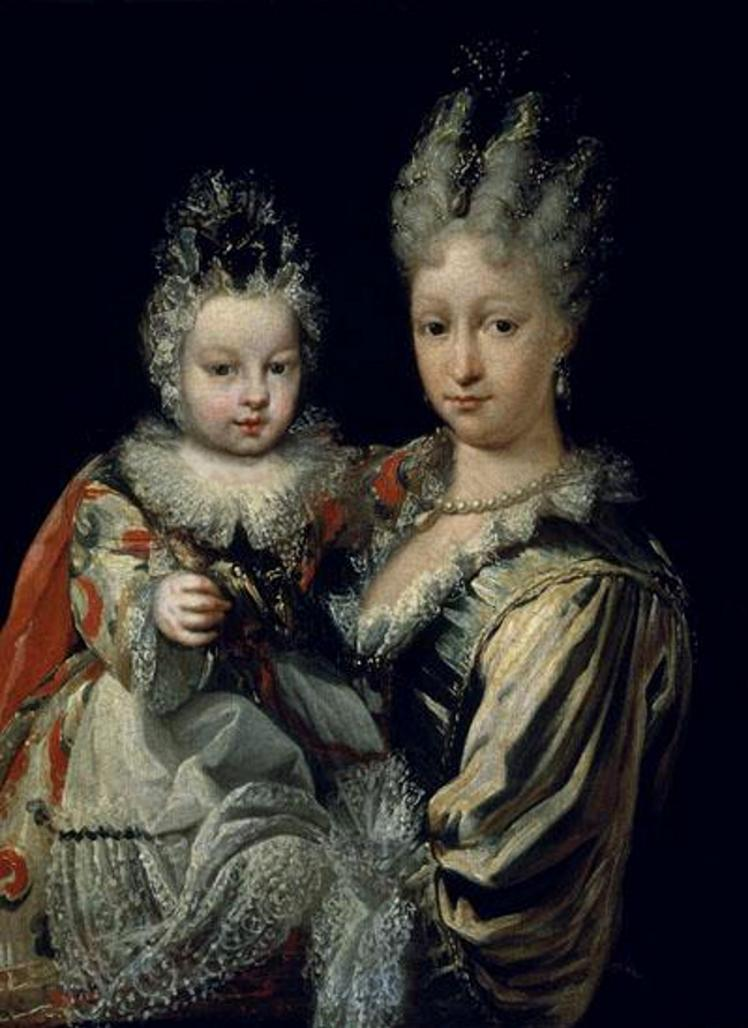
Elisabeth Farnese, with her eldest son Charles; the Treaty confirmed his right to the Duchies of Parma and Tuscany

The 1713 Treaty of Utrecht confirmed Philip V as the first Bourbon king of Spain, in return for ceding Naples, Sicily, Milan and Sardinia. Britain also retained the Spanish ports of Gibraltar and Mahón, captured during the War of the Spanish Succession.

When Elisabeth Farnese became Philip's second wife in 1714, he already had two sons who were next in line for the Spanish throne. She wanted to create an Italian inheritance for her own children, while Philip viewed regaining these territories as important for his prestige. Spain re-occupied Sardinia unopposed in 1717 but a landing on Sicily in 1718 led to the War of the Quadruple Alliance. The Royal Navy's victory at Cape Passaro in August isolated the Spanish invasion force and ultimately forced them to surrender to Austrian troops in 1719.

In the 1720 Treaty of The Hague, Spain renounced its Italian possessions, in return for a guarantee Parma would go to Elisabeth's eldest son Charles on the death of the childless Duke of Parma. The new British monarch, George I, agreed to raise the question of returning Gibraltar in Parliament 'at a favourable opportunity.' Frustration at the lack of progress on this and commercial tensions led to the 1727 to 1729 Anglo-Spanish War.

Military action was primarily limited to an attack on Porto Bello, Panama by the British and an unsuccessful siege of Gibraltar by Spain, who also imposed restrictions on British merchants. The two countries agreed a truce in February 1728; hoping to deter Spain from an alliance with Austria, British envoy Benjamin Keene negotiated the Treaty of El Pardo in March. Considered too lenient by London, the agreement was repudiated, leading to the Congress of Soissons. There the British negotiated with a position of strength - a strategy that proved successful; most notably preventing a Spanish-Austrian alliance against Britain.

== Details ==
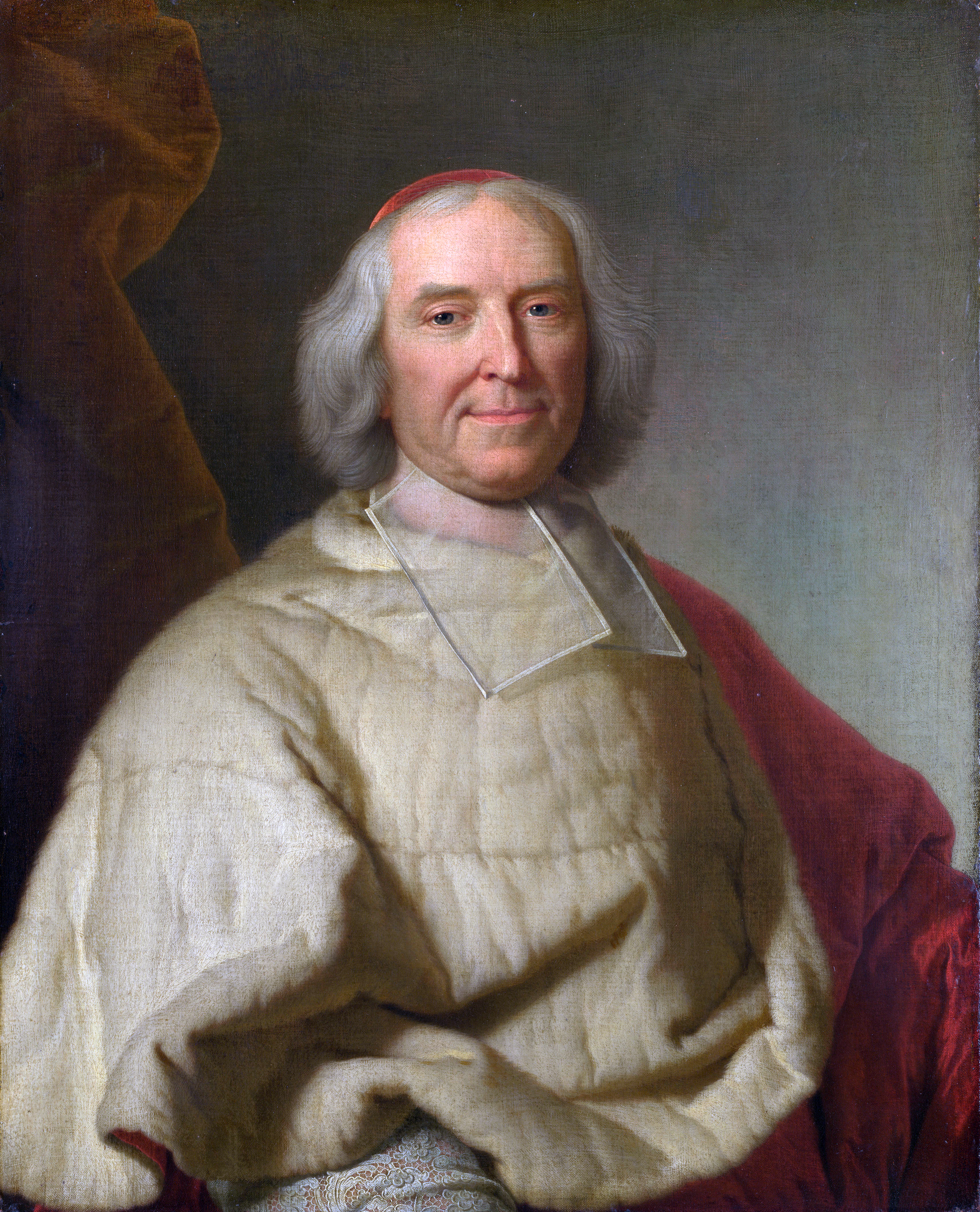
French chief minister Cardinal Fleury; he arranged the Congress of Soissons, which agreed terms signed at Seville

The Treaty of Seville is best understood in the context of a number of European diplomatic issues over the period, one being Elisabeth Farnese's desire for an Italian kingdom for her son. Another was the 1716 Anglo-French Alliance; although both sides grew increasingly suspicious of each other, the succession of George I in 1714 and his concern for Hanover made this more important to Britain than previously. Emperor Charles VI wanted the other Powers to support the 1713 Pragmatic Sanction and thus ensure the succession of his daughter Maria Theresa. Commercial issues included the Austrian-owned Ostend Company, which competed for the East Indies trade with British, French and Dutch merchants, as well as Spanish concerns over British incursions in New Spain.

The result was an almost continuous series of conferences and agreements, including the 1720 to 1724 Congress of Cambrai and the 1721 Treaty of Madrid. The 1725 Peace of Vienna between Austria and Spain was followed by the Treaty of Hanover, signed by France, Britain, Hanover and Prussia. Europe was on the verge of a general war, avoided when French chief minister Cardinal Fleury invited Austria, France and Britain to the Congress of Soissons, although Spain was excluded.

Trading privileges for British and French merchants in Cádiz were restored and compensation paid for losses, with an Anglo-Spanish commission established to discuss commercial issues in the Americas. Britain and France supported the rights of Elisabeth's son Charles to Parma, with the addition of the Duchy of Tuscany; Spain could also send 6,000 troops to garrison the duchies in advance. These terms were presented to the Spanish, who signed on 9 November, the Dutch Republic joining the Treaty on 29th.

== Aftermath ==
The Treaty failed to resolve underlying issues, such as the loss of Mahón and Gibraltar, while the Commission made little progress. The Anglo-French Alliance lapsed in 1731 and Britain agreed the 1731 Treaty of Vienna with Austria, although they co-operated with France to ensure Charles inherited Parma in 1732. As a result of the 1733 to 1735 War of the Polish Succession, he exchanged it for the Kingdom of Naples and in 1759 became king of Spain.

Anglo-Spanish tensions increased with the founding of the British colony of Georgia in 1732, which Spain considered a threat to Spanish Florida, vital to protect shipping routes with mainland Spain. For their part, the British viewed the 1733 Pacte de Famille between Louis XV and his uncle Philip as the first step in being replaced by France as Spain's largest trading partner. These ultimately led first to the War of Jenkins' Ear in 1739, then the 1740 to 1748 War of the Austrian Succession.

== Sources ==
- Browning, Reed (1975). The Duke of Newcastle. Yale University. ISBN 9780300017465.
- Hargreaves-Mawdsley, W.N (1973). Spain Under the Bourbons, 1700–1833. Macmillan. ISBN 978-0333106846.
- Ibañez, Ignacio Rivas (2008). Mobilizing Resources for War: The Intelligence Systems during the War of Jenkins' Ear. PHD UCL.
- Lindsay, JO (1957). International Relations in The New Cambridge Modern History: Volume 7, The Old Regime, 1713–1763. Cambridge University Press. ISBN 978-0521045452.
- McKay, Derek (1983). The Rise of the Great Powers 1648–1815 (First ed.). Routledge. ISBN 978-0582485549.
- Savelle, Max (1974). Empires to Nations: Expansion in America, 1713–1824 (Europe and the World in Age of Expansion). University of Minnesota Press. ISBN 978-0816607815.
- Simms, Brendan (2008). Three Victories and a Defeat: The Rise and Fall of the First British Empire, 1714–1783. Penguin Books. ISBN 978-0140289848.
- Tucker, Spencer C, ed. (2012). Almanac of American Military History; Volume I. ABC-CLIO. ISBN 978-1598845303.
- Solano, Ana Crespa (2011). "A Change of Ideology in Imperial Spain?". In Rommelse, Gijs; Onnekink, David (eds.). Ideology and Foreign Policy in Early Modern Europe (1650–1750). Routledge. ISBN 978-1409419136.
- Tucker, Spencer, ed. (2009). A Global Chronology of Conflict: From the Ancient World to the Modern Middle East. ABC-CLIO. ISBN 978-1851096671.
