= José de Carvajal y Lancáster =

Spanish statesman

The Most Excellent José de Carvajal y Lancáster
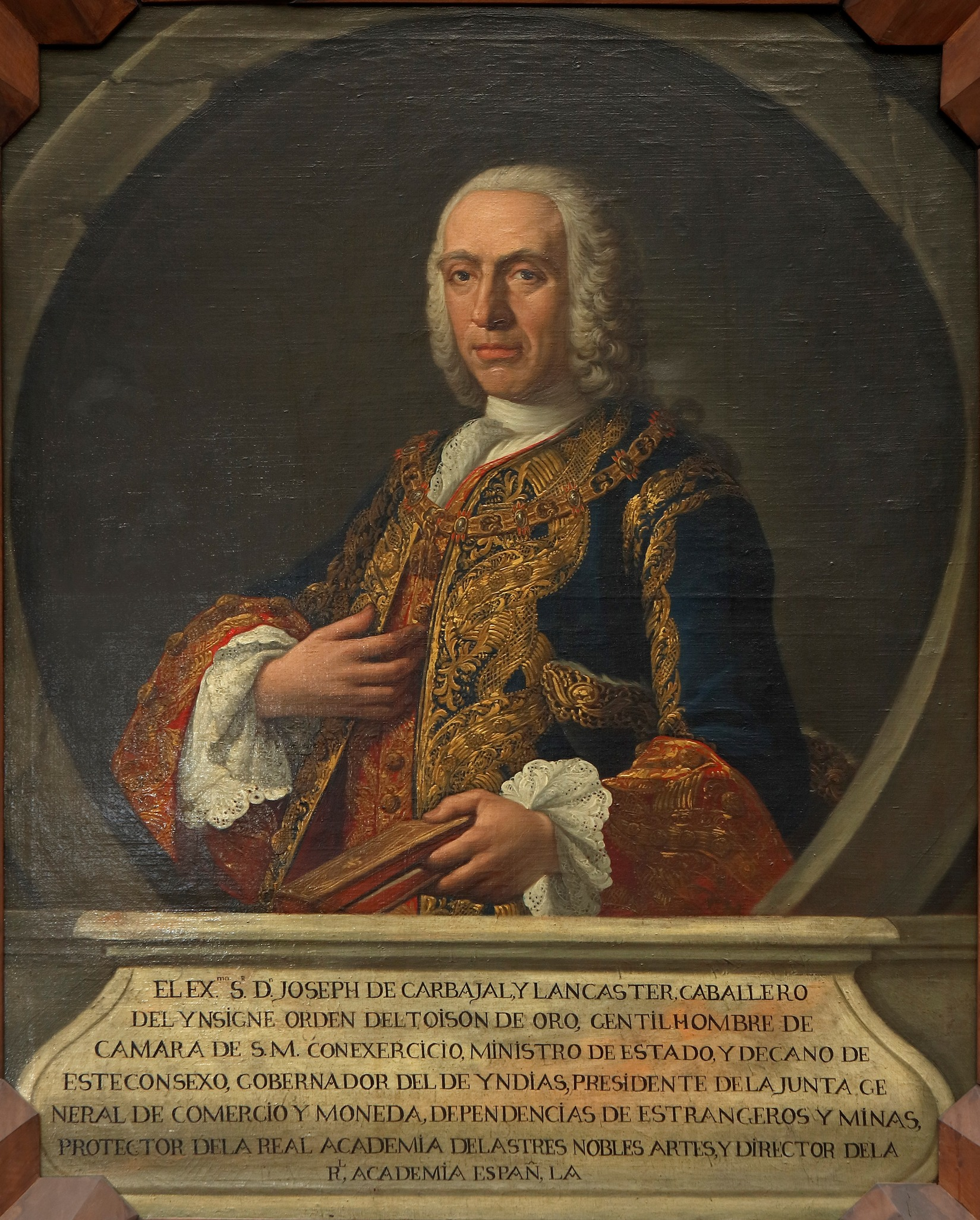

First Secretary of State
- In office 4 December 1746 – 8 April 1754
- Monarch: Ferdinand VI
- Preceded by: The Marquis of Villarías
- Succeeded by: The Duke of Huéscar

Seat O of the Real Academia Española
- In office 13 May 1751 – 8 April 1754
- Preceded by: Diego de Villegas y Saavedra Quevedo
- Succeeded by: Fernando de Silva

Director of the Real Academia Española
- In office 13 May 1751 – 8 April 1754
- Preceded by: Juan López Pacheco
- Succeeded by: Fernando de Silva

Personal details
- Born: 1698 Cáceres, Spain
- Died: 8 April 1754 (aged 55–56) Madrid, Spain
- Relations: Nicolás de Carvajal (brother)
- Parent: Bernadino de Carvajal y Vivero Maria Josefa de Lancastre

José de Carvajal y Lancáster (1698 – 8 April 1754) was a Spanish statesman who served as the first secretary of state from 1746 to 1754.

== Biography ==
He was the descendant of infante Jorge de Lancastre, (an illegitimate son of King John II of Portugal) and Moctezuma II. After graduating at the University of Salamanca, he was appointed oidor (judge) of the Chancillería of Valladolid and later councillor of the Council of the Indies. Prime minister José del Campillo elected him as his personal secretary. In 1746, he was appointed president of the Junta of Commerce and Money, and promoted the establishment of chartered corporations for the improvement of regional trade and manufacture.

The new king Ferdinand VI appointed him First Secretary of State that same year, and carried out a neutrality policy. In 1750, he signed the agreement between Spain and Portugal that finished the disputes over the borders of Río de la Plata and Brazil; Colonia del Sacramento returned to Spain in exchange of some Paraguayan territories.

He reformed the royal mail and in 1752 founded definitively the Real Academia de Bellas Artes de San Fernando.

== Bibliography ==
- Molina, Juan: José de Carvajal: un ministro para el reformismo borbónico, Cáceres: Institución Cultural El Brocense, 1999
- Delgado, José Miguel: El proyecto político de Carvajal: pensamiento y reforma en tiempos de Fernando VI, Madrid: CSIC, 2001

Political offices
Preceded by The Marquis of Villarías	First Secretary of State; 1746–1754	Succeeded by The Duke of Huéscar
