= José Antonio de Gaztañeta =

Spanish Navy officer (1656–1728)

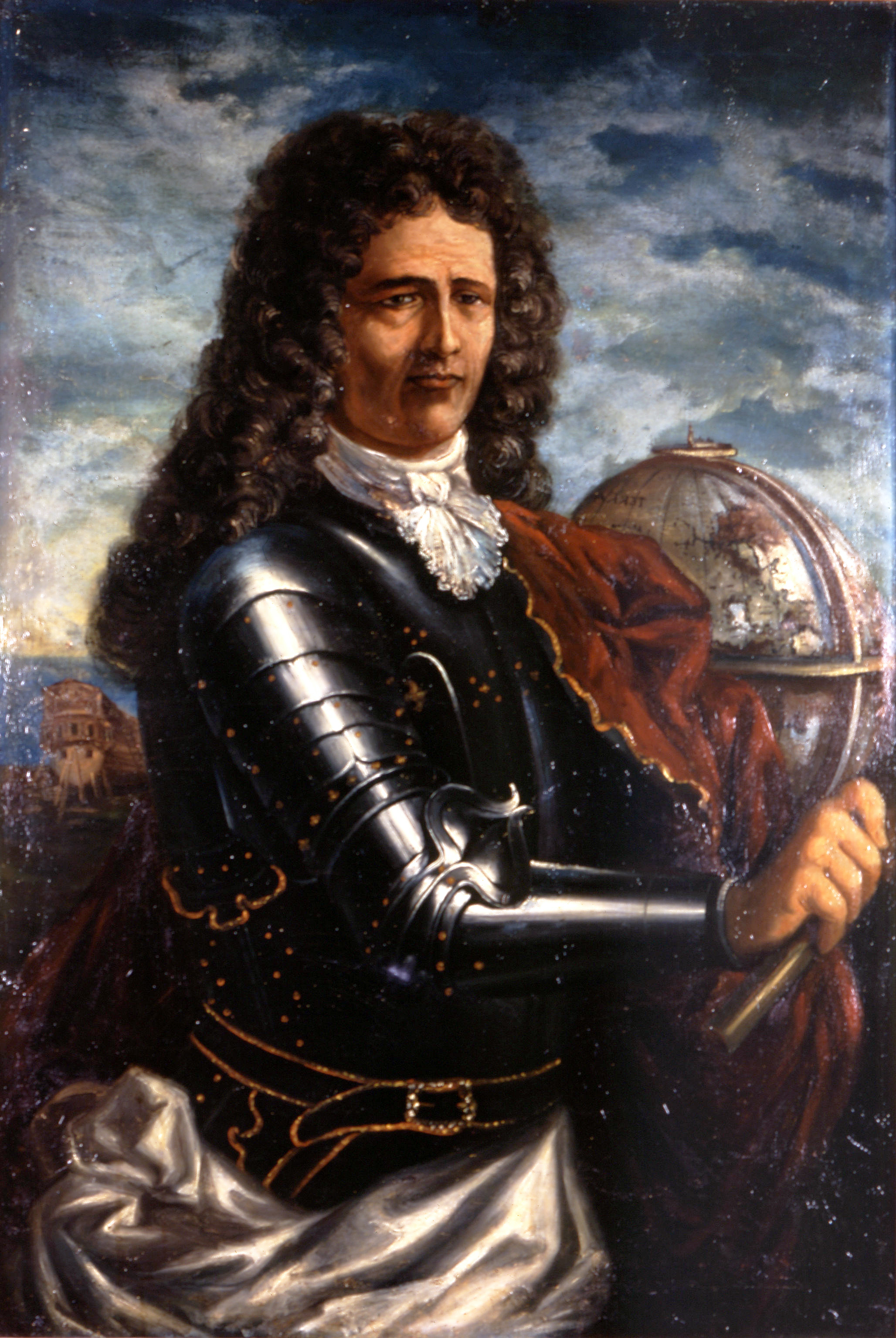
José Antonio de Gaztañeta.

Lieutenant-General José Antonio de Gaztañeta e Iturribalzaga (c. 1656 – c. 1728) was a Spanish Navy officer. He was an innovator who applied a scientific approach to ship design, and was at the origin of the revival of the Spanish Navy in the eighteenth century. During the War of the Quadruple Alliance, he commanded the Spanish Mediterranean fleet at the Battle of Cape Passaro against the British Royal Navy on 11 August 1718 off the coast of Sicily, where Gaztañeta's fleet was decisively defeated. This led to his most important contribution in the field of ship building, the renovation and re-organisation of the Spanish Navy following its poor performance in the war. Gaztañeta also participated in the Anglo-Spanish War of 1727 to 1729, where he successfully guided a Spanish fleet through the British blockade of Porto Bello in Panama.

== Life ==
De Gaztañeta was born in Mutriku, Gipuzkoa. Son of Francisco de Gaztañeta, a Basque sailor to the Americas, he accompanied his father from the age of 12. In 1684, at the age of 28, he had already sailed 11 times to the Americas and back. In that year he joined the Spanish Navy. In 1691 he was posted in Cadiz and was involved in several campaigns of the War of the Grand Alliance against France. He saved a fleet coming back from Naples, cleverly avoiding an ambush by Admiral Tourville near Mahon.

During the War of Spanish Succession (1701–1714), he wasn't involved in warfare, but in ship building. He founded the shipyard of El Astillero. Later he went to the Basque Country and led the construction of many ships in Amorebieta, Pasajes and Orio.

In the War of the Quadruple Alliance (1718-1720) he was appointed head of the fleet which was to sail the Spanish Army under the Marquis of Lede to Sardinia and Sicily. After this was accomplished he positioned his fleet at Cape Passaro. The Spanish fleet was sailing in a scattered formation when it caught sight of the approaching British fleet and this led to a disastrous defeat in the Battle of Cape Passaro for the Spanish. Francisco de Gaztañeta's ship was captured, suffering 200 killed. Gaztañeta was injured in his foot and was made a prisoner of the British. He was released very soon and wasn't blamed for the defeat on his return to Spain.

He was promoted to Lieutenant General in 1720 and was made head of the Spanish treasure fleet. During the Anglo-Spanish War (1727) he guided the fleet through the British blockade of Puerto Bello, consisting of the fleets of Admirals Hosier and Wager. On his safe arrival in Spain King Philip V of Spain awarded him with a great deal of money for his achievement. Gaztañeta died suddenly in Madrid on 5 February 1728. Gaztañeta married twice. Cosme Damián Churruca was a relative.

== Works ==
- Arte de fabricar reales (1688).
- Norte de la navegación hallado por el cuadrante de reducción. (1696)
- Cuadrante geométrico universal para la conversión esférica a los planos, aplicado al arte de navegar. (1697)
- Proporción de las medidas arregladas a la construcción de un bajel de guerra de setenta codos de quilla. (1712)
- Proporciones de las medidas más esenciales para la fábrica de nuevos navíos y fragatas de guerra. (1720)
