= Anglo-Spanish War (1727–1729) =

18th-century war

- Part of the Anglo-Spanish wars
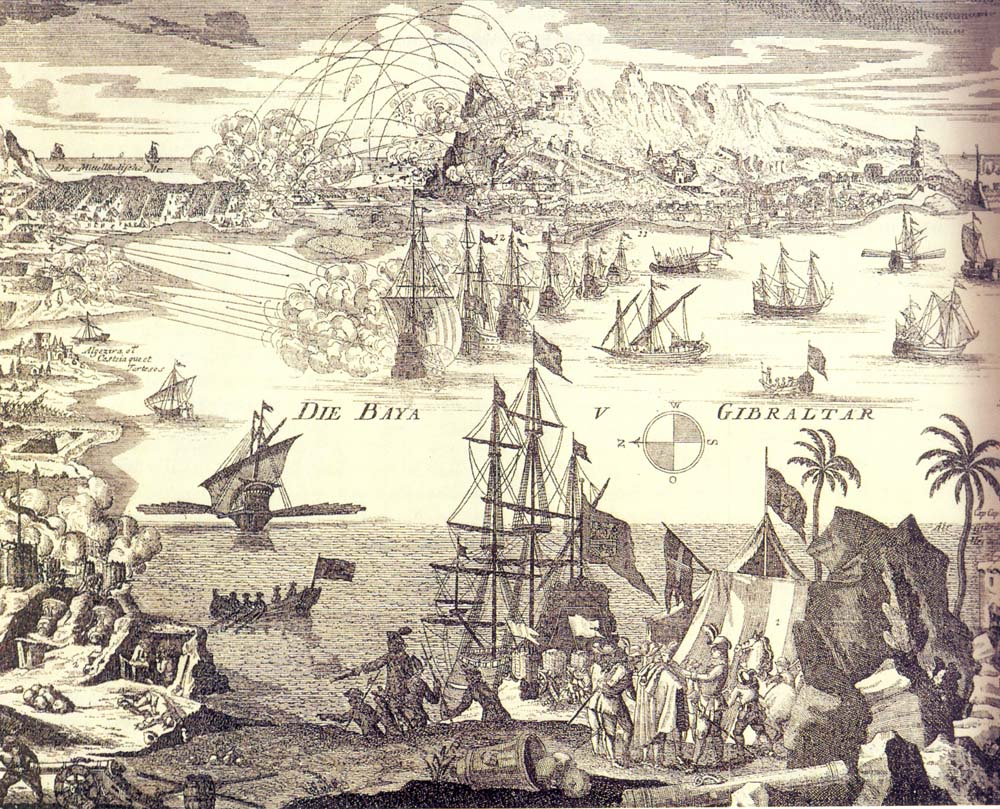
- Contemporary representation of the siege of Gibraltar in 1727
Date	11 February, 1727–9 November, 1729
Location	Gibraltar, Porto Bello, Mediterranean Sea
Result	Status quo ante bellum Treaty of Seville (1729)

Belligerents
Great Britain	Spain

Commanders and leaders
(Kingdom of Great Britain) George I # (Kingdom of Great Britain) George II (Kingdom of Great Britain) Robert Walpole (Kingdom of Great Britain) George Forbes (Kingdom of Great Britain) David Colyear (Kingdom of Great Britain) Richard Kane (Kingdom of Great Britain) Charles Wager (Kingdom of Great Britain) Francis Hosier # (Kingdom of Great Britain) Edward St Lo # (Kingdom of Great Britain) Edward Hopson #	(Spain) Philip V (Spain) Juan Ripperdá (Spain) Cristóbal Moscoso (Spain) Jorge Verboom (Spain) Antonio Gaztañeta # (Spain) Miguel Enríquez (Spain) Juan Andía (Spain) Gregorio Guazo †

Strength
5,500 men 1 frigate 13 ships of the line 2 sloops of war 1 snow	17,500 men 1 frigate

Casualties and losses
Total: 4,326; 4,118 killed (Note: Most of the British dead were killed by diseases such as yellow fever.); 207 wounded 1 ship wrecked	Total: 1,685; 492 killed 1,119 wounded 1 frigate captured

The Anglo-Spanish War of 1727–1729 was a limited war that took place between Great Britain and Spain during the late 1720s, and consisted of a failed Spanish attempt to capture Gibraltar and an unsuccessful British Blockade of Porto Bello with a high British death toll. It eventually ended with a return to the previous status quo ante bellum following the Treaty of Seville.

== Background ==
During the War of the Spanish Succession, Spain lost Gibraltar to an Anglo-Dutch fleet and when the war finished in 1714, Spain was forced to accept the loss of Gibraltar in the Treaty of Utrecht, but it was a long-term goal of Spain to recover both Gibraltar and the island of Menorca from the British.

After the Treaty of Vienna in 1725, Spain had the support of Austria and thought the time to be right to try to recapture Gibraltar. In reaction, Britain signed the Treaty of Hanover with France and Prussia.

Some historians put the beginning of the war in 1726, the year in which the Anglo-Spanish relation was already very tense. A British fleet was sent to the Spanish West Indies to disturb Spanish shipping without actually starting a war.

== Action ==
=== Porto Bello ===
Britain had tried to use its naval power early in the dispute, by blockading Porto Bello in Panama but the attempt proved a disaster, in which 4,000 men were lost to disease. The main objective of the blockade had been to prevent Spanish galleons leaving and sailing for Spain, but the blockade failed to accomplish this - and eventually withdrew.

=== Siege of Gibraltar ===
On 11 February 1727 Spain, under command of the Marquis de las Torres and supervision of Chief Engineer of the Spanish Royal Engineer Corps Marquis of Verboom, laid siege to the city (Thirteenth Siege of Gibraltar). Depending on the sources, Spanish troops were between 12,000 and 25,000. British defenders were 1,500 at the beginning of the siege, increasing up to about 5,000 by troops brought from overseas by a fleet commanded by Charles Wager.

After a four-month siege, with several unsuccessful and costly attempts, Spanish troops gave up and retired on 12 June. Spain had lost over 1,400 men while the British had suffered around 300 casualties.

The Spanish had expected material help from the Austrians promised under the Treaty of Vienna, but they received little. They had been outmaneuvered by British diplomats, who had concluded a secret deal with the Austrians to prevent them intervening.

== Peace ==
No more hostilities took place and a truce was declared in February 1728, with a preliminary agreement of issues at the March Convention of El Pardo and the Congress of Soissons. The final peace, that confirmed the status-quo, was concluded in the 1729 Treaty of Seville. Many of the outstanding issues between the two states had not been resolved, and a decade later the War of Jenkins' Ear broke out between them. Britain emerged from the conflict by forming a very strong alliance with Austria, that lasted until 1756.
