= Blockade of Porto Bello =

Engagement in Anglo-Spanish War

Coordinates: 9.554°N 79.672°W

- Part of the Anglo-Spanish War (1727–1729)
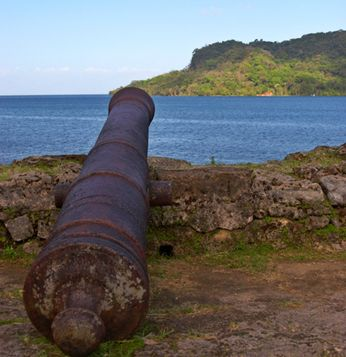
- View across Porto Bello harbour entrance, looking NW from Fort Santiago
| Date | 1726–1728 |
| Location | Porto Bello (present-day Panama) |
| Result | Spanish victory Spanish treasure fleet evades blockade. |

Belligerents
| Great Britain | Spain |

Commanders and leaders
| (Kingdom of Great Britain) Francis Hosier # (Kingdom of Great Britain) Edward St Lo # (Kingdom of Great Britain) Edward Hopson # | (Spain) Antonio Gaztañeta (Spain) Gregorio Guazo † (Spain) Juan Andía |

Strength
| 11 ships of line 1 frigate 2 sloops of war 1 snow 4,750 men | 2,000 troops |

Casualties and losses
| 4,000+ dead 1 ship wrecked | |
- Most British casualties were due to yellow fever and other tropical diseases.

The Blockade of Porto Bello was a failed British naval action against the Spanish port of Porto Bello in present-day Panama between 1726 and 1727 as part of the Anglo-Spanish War. The British were attempting to blockade the port to stop the Spanish treasure fleet leaving for Spain with its valuable cargo. However tropical disease took its toll of the seamen to the extent that the British had to leave to re-crew, during which time the Spanish were able to re-commence shipping operations.

== Background ==
Spain and Britain had come into conflict during the 1720s over a number of issues, and had recently been at war with each other during the War of the Quadruple Alliance. Disputes over trade were a major cause of aggravation to Anglo-Spanish relations, combined with a fear in Britain that Spain had made an alliance with Austria as the precursor to declaring war on Britain and its ally France. The British decided to try to weaken Spain and discourage them from pursuing the Austrian alliance by denying the Spanish the treasure fleets on which metropolitan Spain had become dependent.

In March 1726 an expedition was sent to the Spanish West Indies, under Rear-Admiral Francis Hosier, for the purpose of blocking up the Spanish galleons or seizing them should they venture out. The former privateer and governor of the Bahamas Woodes Rogers, who was in London at the time, was consulted by the Government as to the probable means and route the Spaniards would adopt to get their treasure home. From past experience Rogers probably knew more than any other person then in England of the difficulties of the voyage, and in conjunction with Capt. Jonathan Denniss, (Note: Probably the same Capt. Denniss who in 1718 conducted an expedition to Havana, the proceedings of which are in The National Archives Colonial Office papers, CO 137,13; Denniss was also associated with Leonard Cocke, a factor of the South Sea Co. in Santiago de Cuba. (PRO SP36/25)) he delivered a report dated 10 November 1726 to Viscount Townshend, Secretary of State, to prepare Hosier for his task:

My Lord, According to what your lordship was pleased to command us, we have considered the account given by Mr Cayley from Cadiz to his grace the Duke of Newcastle of three men-of-war and a ship of ten guns being sent under the command of Admiral Castanetta from that port in the month of May last, with canon and land forces which, your lordship apprehends, may be ordered round Cape Horn, in order to bring to Spain the bullion now detained at Panama, and we give it your lordship as our opinion, that it is not only improbable, but almost impracticable, for the following reasons: First because of the time of year in which those ships sailed from Cadiz, which is at least three months to soon to attempt getting round Cape Horn, or through the Straits of Magellan, especially if the nature of the ships be considered, and their being deeply laden, and having canon and land forces on board. Secondly, because there can be no need of canon in Peru or Chile, those provinces abounding in metal for casting them, and the Spaniards being able to do it (as they always have done) cheaper and full as well as in Spain, and as to the soldiers, the transporting them that way seems altogether improbable because of the many better methods there are of doing it. Thirdly, my Lord, as the bullion is now at or near Panama, the embarking it thence to Lima, and so to be brought round Cape Horn, will require so prodigious an expense both of time and money, that renders the doing of it extremely improbable. 'Tis true, my Lord, were the money now at Potosi or Lima 'twould be easy enough to bring it round Cape Horn, or rather overland to Buenos Aires, where Castanetta might be gone to receive it, but as it is not, the bringing of it from Panama to Lima will require too long a time, because of the difficulty of the navigation from the former to the latter place, being against both winds and currents, so that the Spanish ships are commonly from six to eight or ten months performing the voyage, and though the French formerly often came with their money round the Cape to France, yet your Lordship will consider their tract of trade was never to leeward, or to the northward of the coasts of Peru, by which means the greatest fatigue of the voyage was avoided.

Map showing alternative sea routes used by Spanish ships to repatriate treasure (mainly silver from Peru) to Spain, as advised in 1726 to Secretary of State Townshend by Woodes Rogers and Jonathan Denniss

But, my Lord, what seems to us the most likely is that Castanetta after refreshing at the Havana, may go to La Vera Cruz, and there wait for the bullion from Panama (from whence it may be sent to La Vera Cruz under a notion of its being re-shipped for Peru) and so bring it to Havana there to join the Flota, and so come for Spain (or send it home in running ships and our reason for this suggestion is not only for the above difficulties that must and will attend bringing the bullion now at Panama to Spain, round Cape Horn, or by the way of Buenos Aires, but because of the facility and dispatch with which it may be transported from Panama to Acapulco, and so by land to La Vera Cruz, which is what has been often practised by the Spaniards, even when there was no blockade at Porto Belloo nor fear of enemies (as a conveniency for Spain has offered), for the navigation from Panama to Acapulco is very safe and easy, and the carriage from thence to La Vera Cruz is neither so difficult nor expensive as that between Lima and Buenos Aires. This, my Lord, is what occurs to us worthy your Lordship's notice. We are, with the uttermost respect and submission My Lord, Your Lordship's most devoted and most obedient humble servants, Woodes Rogers. Jonath. Denniss.

=== Blockade ===
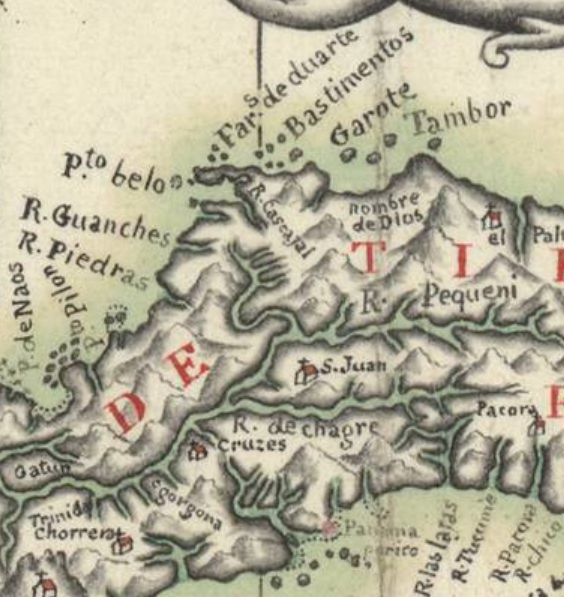
1771 map showing position of Bastimentos Island between Porto Bello and the former harbour of Nombre de Dios

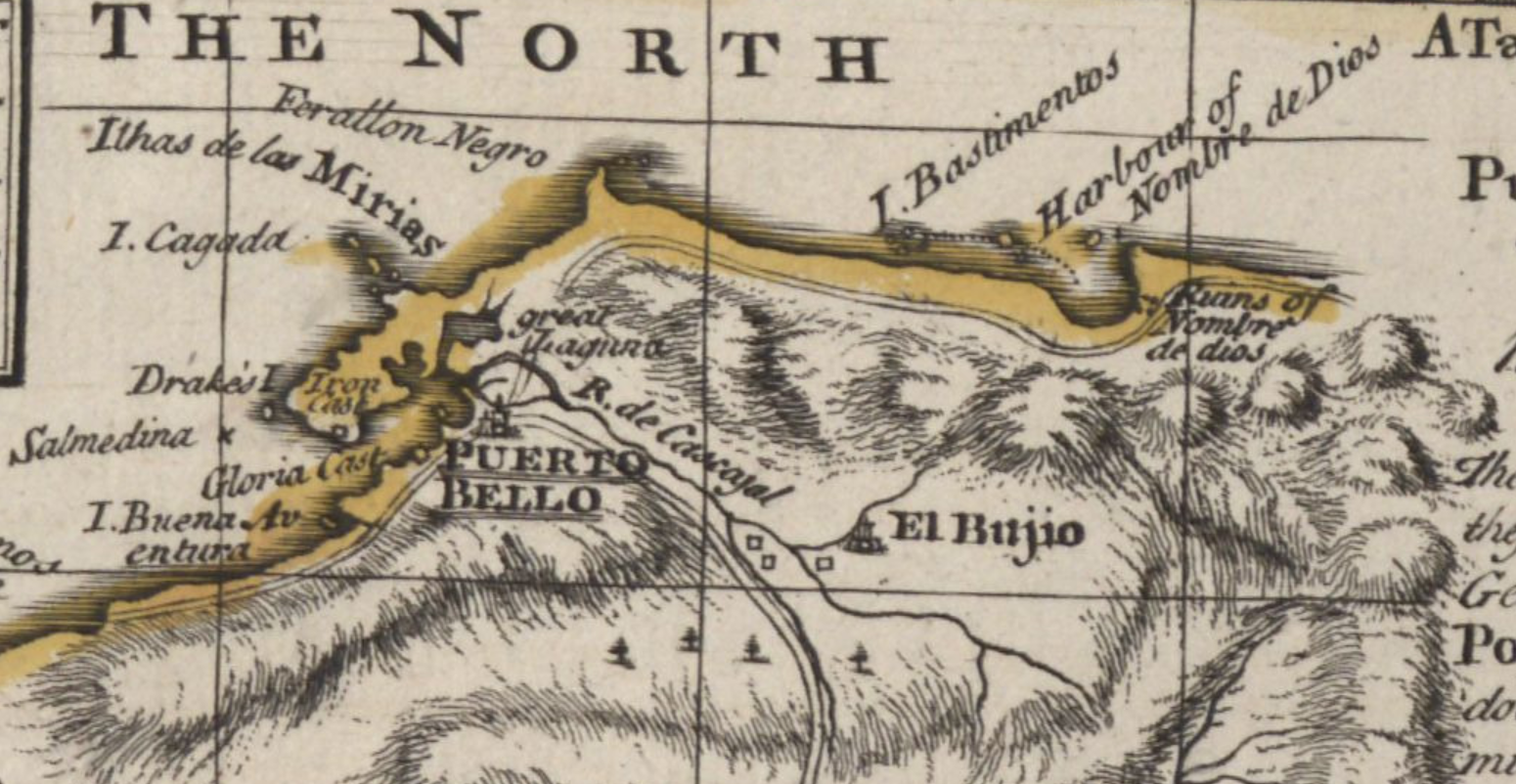
1740 map showing position of Bastimentos Island between Porto Bello and the former harbour of Nombre de Dios

Hosier's fleet appeared off Bastimentos, 11 km to the north-east of Porto Bello, on 16 June 1726. This Bastimentos is shown on contemporary maps between Porto Bello and Nombre de Dios, the former treasure port captured twice by Drake, in 1572 and 1595, after which it was abandoned and replaced by Portobello. It should not be confused with the now better known Bastimentos Island 271 km (168 mi) to the west of Porto Bello. Following orders ultimately from Walpole to blockade Porto Bello but not to take it, Hosier remained before it, allowing no ships to go in or come out without strict examination. On first arrival of the squadron several Spanish ships were captured. The Spanish convoy unloaded its valuables and waited.

After remaining for six months, yellow fever made such havoc among his seamen that he was compelled to return to Jamaica, where he recruited fresh crews. Two months later, he was again at sea and continued to cruise in the Caribbean Sea in front of Cartagena, still losing men to the disease. Furthermore, this absence from Porto Bello made the blockade ineffective, and in January 1727, Antonio de Gaztañeta slipped a Spanish treasure fleet with 31 million pesos on board through the British blockade reaching Spain on 8 March 1727.

The incidence of fever was accelerated by a disregard for basic sanitation and hygiene in the British fleet. Between three and four thousand British sailors died of disease out of a complement of 4,600. Hosier himself died of yellow fever on 23 August 1727. His body was wrapped in a sheet and left in the hold of his flagship for four months, until a ship was found to return it to England for burial.

Hosier was temporarily replaced by Edward St Lo, who maintained the blockade and returned to Jamaica to resupply and refit the fleet when it was clear the Spanish fleet would not leave port. In Jamaica he was replaced by Edward Hopson in January 1728, but regained command when Hopson succumbed to disease the following May. St Lo continued to command the blockading fleet until April 1729, when he too died of a tropical malady. By this time, preliminary peace terms had been agreed between the two powers, and the fleet returned home. The war came to a formal end with the signing in November 1729 of the Treaty of Seville.

=== Fleet ===
Location of Porto Bello in Panama

The fleet comprised 20 ships, including the following:

- HMS Breda, 70 guns, Flagship
- HMS Berwick, 70 guns
- HMS Lenox, 70 guns
- HMS Superb, 64 guns
- HMS Dunkirk, 60 guns
- HMS Nottingham, 60 guns
- HMS Rippon, 60 guns
- HMS Portland, 50 guns
- HMS Leopard, 50 guns
- HMS Tiger, 50 guns
- HMS Dragon, 50 guns
- HMS Diamond, frigate
- HMS Greyhound, sloop
- HMS Happy (Return?), snow

=== Aftermath ===
This disaster caused an outrage in Britain and Hosier became an easy scapegoat, being blamed for a lack of initiative, although in reality his hands had been tied by Admiralty orders, stemming from Walpole's wish to avoid war with Spain. At the beginning of the maritime War of Jenkins' Ear (1739–42) the disaster still had not been forgotten and following Admiral Vernon's Capture of Porto Bello on 21 November 1739 with only 6 ships, which vindication raised the British public's joy to fever pitch, and inspired the writing of Rule, Britannia! Britannia Rule the Waves!, Richard Glover wrote a spirited ballad, Hosier's Ghost, Admiral Hosier's Ghost which further excited the British nation against the Spaniards, but was primarily designed to shame Walpole and the anti-war faction for his 1726 orders of inaction, which many considered had been a betrayal of Hosier and his men.

== Bibliography ==
- Duro, Cesáreo Fernández (1972). Armada Española Desde la Unión de los Reinos de Castilla y de León, Madrid. Vol. 5. Madrid: Museo Naval. OCLC 644540083.
- Kemp, Peter (1970). The British sailor: A social history of the lower deck. Aldine Press. ISBN 0460039571.
- Marley, David (1998). Wars of the Americas, a Chronology of Armed Conflict in the New World, 1492 to the Present. ABC-CLIO. ISBN 9780874368376.
