= Thirteenth siege of Gibraltar =

1727 siege of the Anglo-Spanish War

- Part of the Anglo-Spanish War (1727–1729)
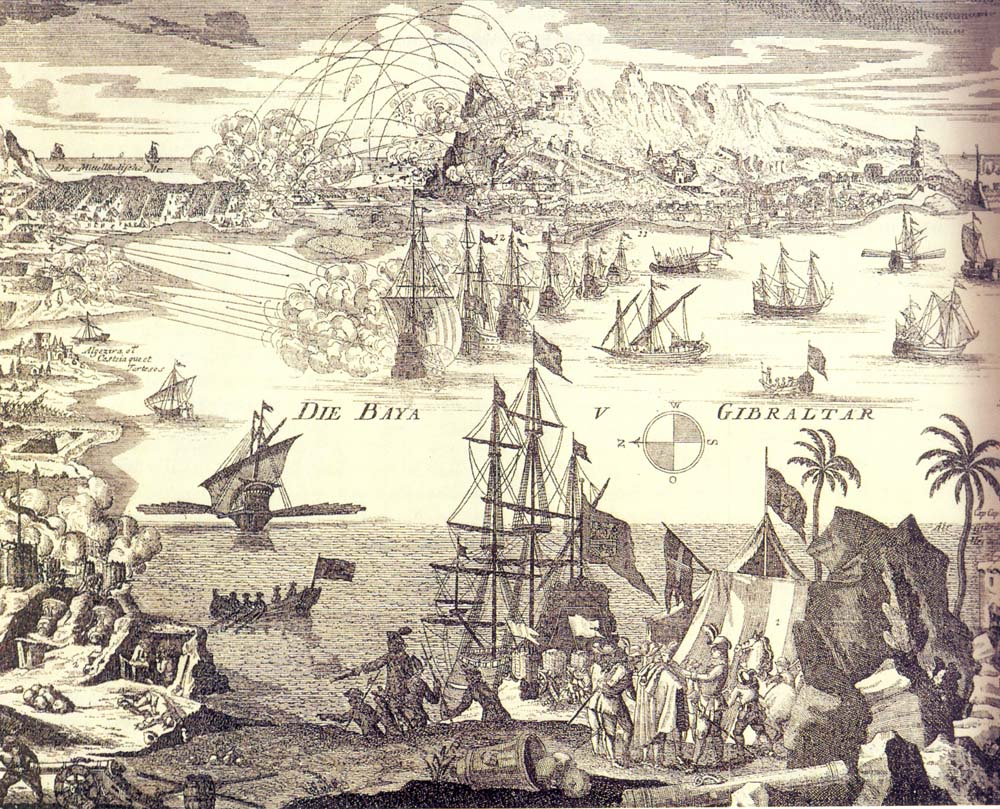
- German print of the siege
| Date | 11 February – 12 June 1727 (OS) |
| Location | Gibraltar 36.152336°N 5.345199°W |
| Result | British victory |

Belligerents
| Great Britain | Spain |

Commanders and leaders
| David Colyear; Richard Kane; Charles Wager | Cristóbal Moscoso; Jorge de Verboom |

Strength
| 5,500 | 17,500 |

Casualties and losses
| 118 killed 207 wounded | 392 killed 1,019 wounded |

The thirteenth siege of Gibraltar saw Spanish forces besiege the British garrison of Gibraltar as part of the Anglo-Spanish War. Depending on the sources, Spanish troops numbered between 12,000 and 25,000. British defenders were 1,500 at the beginning of the siege, increasing up to about 5,000. After a five-month siege with several unsuccessful and costly assaults, Spanish troops gave up and withdrew. Following the failure the war drew to a close, opening the way for the 1728 Treaty of El Pardo and the Treaty of Seville signed in 1729.

== Background ==
On 1 January 1727 (N.S.) the Marquis of Pozobueno, the Spanish ambassador to Britain, sent a letter to the Duke of Newcastle explaining why the Spanish Crown believed that Article 10 of the Peace of Utrecht, which granted Britain perpetual control of Gibraltar under certain conditions, had been nullified:

The cession which his Majesty [King Philip V] made precedently of that Place is become null, because of the infractions made in the conditions on which it was permitted that the English garrison should remain in the possession of Gibraltar; seeing that contrary to all the protestations made, they have not only extended their fortifications by exceeding the limits prescribed and stipulated, but what is more, contrary to the express and literal tenour of the Treaties, they receive and admit the Jews and Moors, in the same manner of the Spaniards, and other nations confounded and mixed, contrary to our holy religion; not to mention the frauds and continual contrabands which are carried on there to the prejudice of his majesty's Revenues.

The letter was tantamount to a declaration of war. Spain, however, was not in a particularly advantageous position to capture Gibraltar in 1727. At the last attempt to retake Gibraltar in 1704, Spain had a strong navy and the additional assistance of French warships. However, following their defeat at the battle of Cape Passaro and the capture of Vigo and Pasajes, the Spanish Navy was severely weakened. The Royal Navy had complete naval supremacy in the Straits, ruling out a Spanish landing in the south, and ensuring that the British garrison would be well supplied through a siege. Also, any attempt to scale the Rock from the east (as five hundred men under Colonel Figueroa, allegedly led by a local goatherd named Simón Susarte, had done in 1704) was now impossible as the British had destroyed the path. The only option of attack open to the Spanish was along a narrow funnel (reduced in width by an inundation) that ran between the sea and the western side of the North Face of the Rock. This narrow strip of land would come under fire from three sides: Willis's battery to the east, the Grand Battery to the south, and the Devil's Tongue Battery on the Old Mole to the west.

A number of Philip V's senior military advisers warned the King that the recapture of Gibraltar was, at the present, near impossible. The Marquis of Villadarias (who had led the previous attempt to capture Gibraltar in 1704) had warned that it would be impossible to take the Rock without naval support. The senior Spanish military engineer Jorge de Verboom, 1st Marquess of Verboom agreed with this opinion, and 'gave it as his considered opinion that the only plan with any possibility of success was of a seaborne attack from the south.' However, the King was impressed by the Count de las Torres de Alcorrín, Viceroy of Navarre, who vowed that he could: 'in six weeks deliver Spain from this noxious settlement of foreigners and heretics'. The disagreement between Verboom and de las Torres was to continue throughout the siege, indeed, so noticeably that later, when the siege was underway, a diarist within Gibraltar (the anonymous 'S.H.') wrote that a Spanish deserter had reported: 'that a dispute hath happen'd betwixt two Generals about storming us, upon which the one... is going to Madrid to complain to the King."

== Opposing forces ==
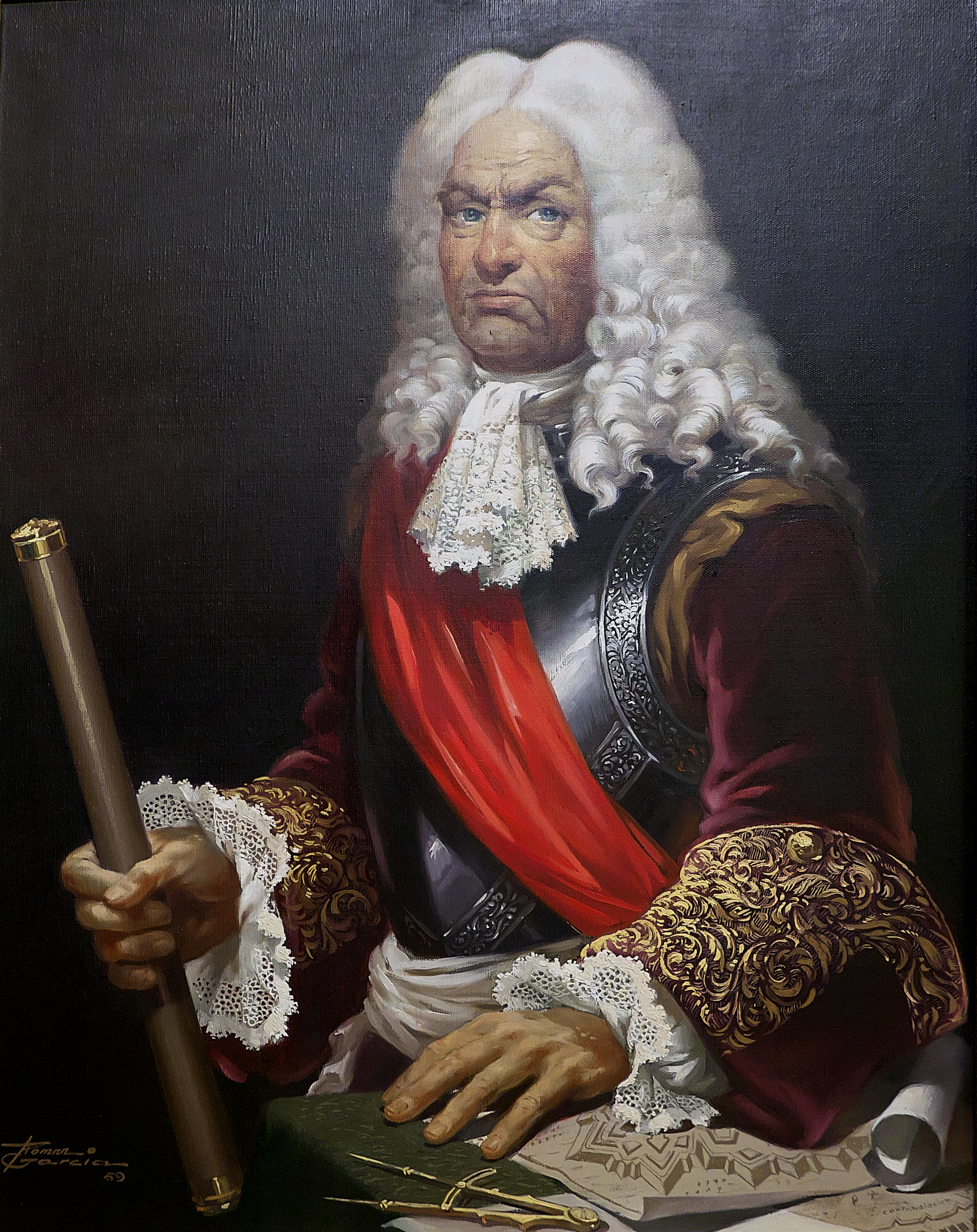
Jorge de Verboom, 1st Marquess of Verboom

Despite Verboom's doubts, the King gave de las Torres leave to attempt an assault on Gibraltar. The count began to muster the besieging troops at San Roque at the start of 1727, in total thirty infantry battalions, six squadrons of horse, seventy-two mortars, and ninety-two guns (although on occasion some heavier guns were brought from Cádiz). Large parts of the army were not themselves Spanish. Of the thirty infantry battalions nineteen were foreign mercenaries: three battalions of Walloons, three French Belgian, four Irish, two Savoyard, two Neapolitan, one Swiss, one Corsican, and one Sicilian. Serving alongside the Jacobite Irish was the infamous Duke of Wharton. A notorious libertine, alcoholic, and founder of the original Hellfire Club, Wharton had fled England (to escape his creditors following the South Sea Bubble stock market crash) and joined the cause of the Old Pretender. He attained permission from Philip V to serve as volunteer aide-de-camp to the Count de las Torres, and was something of an embarrassment to both sides. 'The Duke of Wharton never comes into the trenches but when he is Drunk, and that then, and only then, he is mightily valiant.' He was to be badly injured in the leg during the siege and he was later declared an outlaw by the British Government.

Both the Governor of Gibraltar (the Earl of Portmore) and the Lieutenant Governor (Brigadier Jasper Clayton) were in England when the Spanish began to amass their forces. Colonel Richard Kane, the British commander of Menorca, was in temporary command of the sparsely defended British garrison of approximately 1,200 men from the 5th (Pearce's), the 13th (Lord Mark Kerr's), the 20th (Egerton's), and the 30th (Bisset's) Regiments. Kane expelled the 400 Spanish residents of Gibraltar and continued to improve the defences until 13 February (NS) when Brigadier Clayton arrived with a fleet under Admiral Sir Charles Wager and reinforcements from the 26th (Antruther's), the 29th (Disney's), and the 39th (Newton's) Regiments.

By early February, Spanish labourers had moved down from San Roque to the isthmus and started to construct battle lines. On 22 February (NS) a warning shot was fired over the heads of the working parties. 'The Governor gave them a Gun, at Four O'Clock, by way of Challenge, and, in an hour, Canonaded them very warmly.' Thus the thirteenth siege began.

== Gibraltar under siege ==
=== Early siege ===
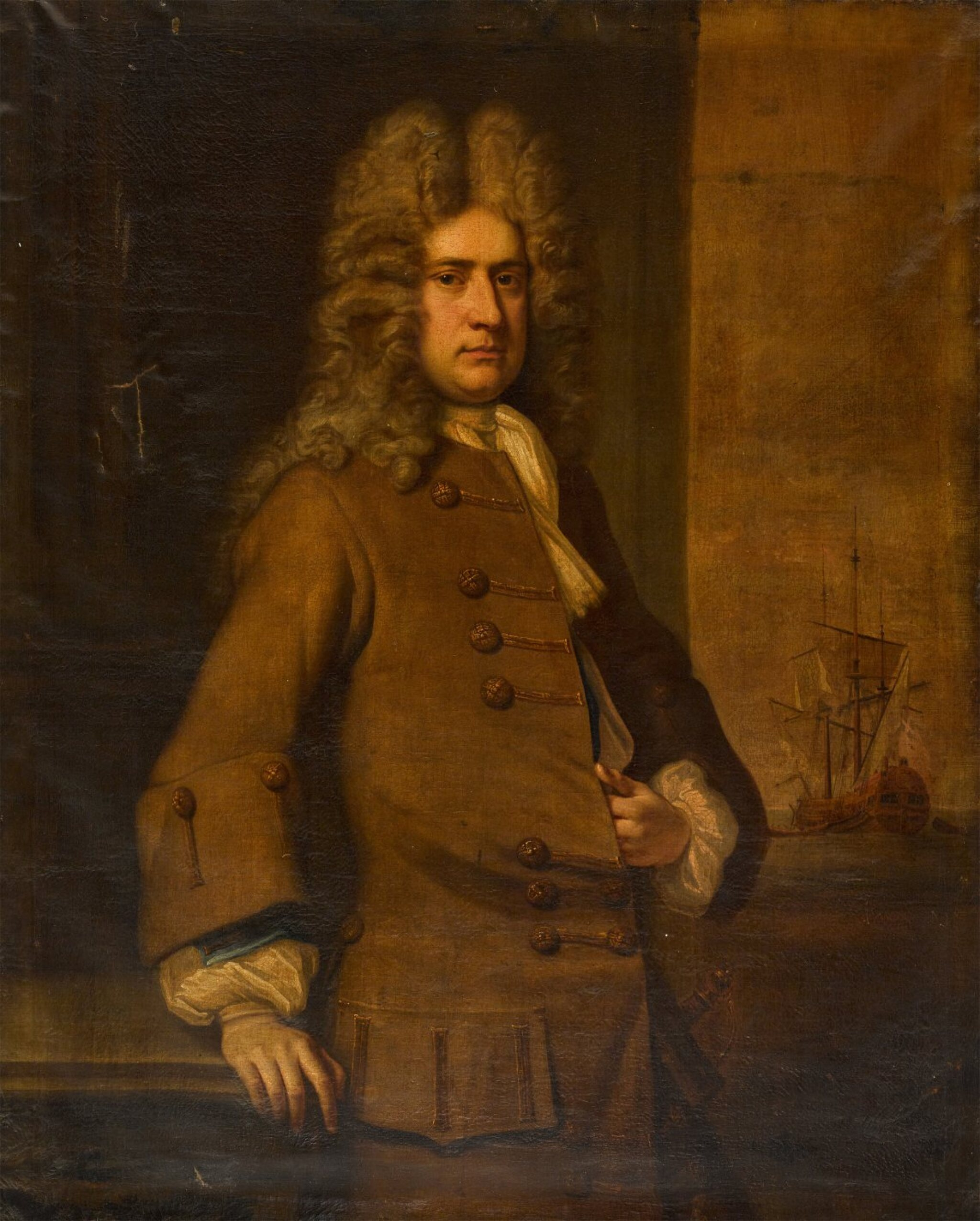
Admiral Sir Charles Wager

The Count de las Torres's first move was, by cover of night, to move five battalions and 1,000 working men forward to take the Devil's Tower and two other abandoned fortifications, and to dig trenches parallel to Gibraltar's walls. Until the invention of the Koehler Gun in the Great Siege (1779–1783), fixed artillery guns could not be depressed below the horizontal, so the Spanish working parties could not be fired upon from the North Face of the Rock. The finished trenches might have provided the attackers with a good foothold from which to assault the town. However, 'Admiral Wager moved his squadron out of the bay to the eastern side of the isthmus, and at point-blank range, yet beyond the reach of the Spanish guns, pounded the men with enfilade fire for three days, inflicting on them perhaps more than 1,000 casualties.' The Spaniards soon built batteries to drive away Wager's ships, but even without naval bombardment the strong winds and heavy rain of February made digging and maintaining the trenches nearly impossible.

Willis's battery, on the North Face of the Rock, gave the Spaniards a great deal of trouble. After a natural cave was discovered in the Rock, a plan was hatched to mine under Willis's Battery and 'excavate a gallery 1.5 metres wide and 1.7 high to a depth of about 25 metres, then a further 20 upwards, and to fill the cavity with 400 barrels of powder.' This activity was noticed by and alarmed the defenders:

They possest themselves of a Cave, under the Rock, in order to undermine it, so as to get into the Town; upon discovery ... our Men made a mine over their Heads and blew up the Rock upon them.

A machine was invented to let a man down the side of the Rock to spy what the Enemy were doing. This was put into execution, in the Night too, with no effect, for the unevenness of the Rock prevented any safe decent, so that we could make no discovery how they propos'd to blow it up.

However, the limestone under Willis's battery was far too solid to mine easily 'in less than the space of eight or ten months and a hazard whether it could be perfected even then or not.'

=== First heavy bombardment ===
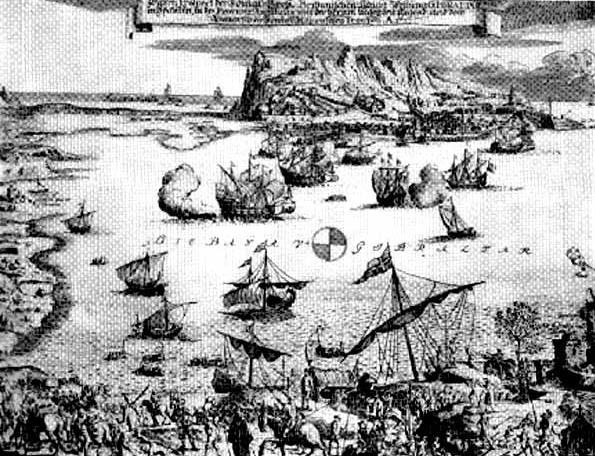
Italian print of the siege of Gibraltar in 1727

Failing to create a strong stepping stone for a land assault, and lacking the means for an assault from the sea, de las Torres's only option now was to pound the British into surrender. On 24 March (NS) the Spanish began what they hoped would be a decisive bombardment:

Prodigious firing all last night ... The Spanish General, it seems, has alter'd his opinion of the Rock, and it seems too hard of Digestion, tho' he has a good stomach to it, yet he is too impatient to wait two years to eat a passage to us that way.

Another contemporary account acknowledged that from this point 'it might rightly be said that ours was a gunner's war. We could do nothing but receive the enemy's fire and return it.' The Spaniards did great damage to the northern part of the town, the affluent Villa Vieja, and 'a hundred houses were by that means laid in rubbish.' After the siege the ruins were removed to create present-day Casemates. Despite the structural damage there were few casualties. The greater concern was the number of men the British had available to man the guns, repair the damage to the fortifications, and serve on sentry duty. This proved to be a major problem for the garrison.

The Spanish bombardment continued for ten days. In his entry for 24 March (O.S.) 'S.H.' noted: 'last three Days very heavy rains and some Wind.' The terrible weather caused great problems for the besiegers in the trenches beneath the rock, and the Spanish had to ease their bombardment. A Spanish official journal published in Madrid in 1727 highlights the problems the besiegers were suffering and their frustrations:

Desertion becomes very considerable, the troops greatly diminished by sickness. Some fresh troops are coming from Malaga to ease those in camp who are greatly fatigued by hard duty: no sally yet made from the town, as the constant rains have hindered the advance of our works and it is supposed they [the British] thought their artillery sufficient to check our progress. We have yet dismounted only three of their cannon on the curtain and deserters say they have not had above 15 men killed yet.

=== Reinforcements arrive ===
During this relative lull in the Spanish bombardment, much needed reinforcements arrived in Gibraltar. On 7 April (N.S.) the 25th (Middleton's, or the King's Own Scottish Borderers) and 34th (Haye's, or the Border Regiment – later the Royal Border Regiment) Regiments arrived with a 480-strong detachment from Menorca. Then on 1 May (NS) the Governor, the Earl of Portmore, arrived with ten companies of the First Guards and the 14th Regiment (Clayton's, or the West Yorkshire Regiment – later the Duke of Wellington's Regiment). Room was made for the new reinforcements by moving troops south. 'Tents were fix'd toward Europa Point and three Regiments encamped to make room in the Town for Middleton and Hayes's who disembarked this day.' Camp Bay derives its name from this siege, when a regiment was encamped above it. 1727 also saw the destruction of the trees which grew on the Rock:

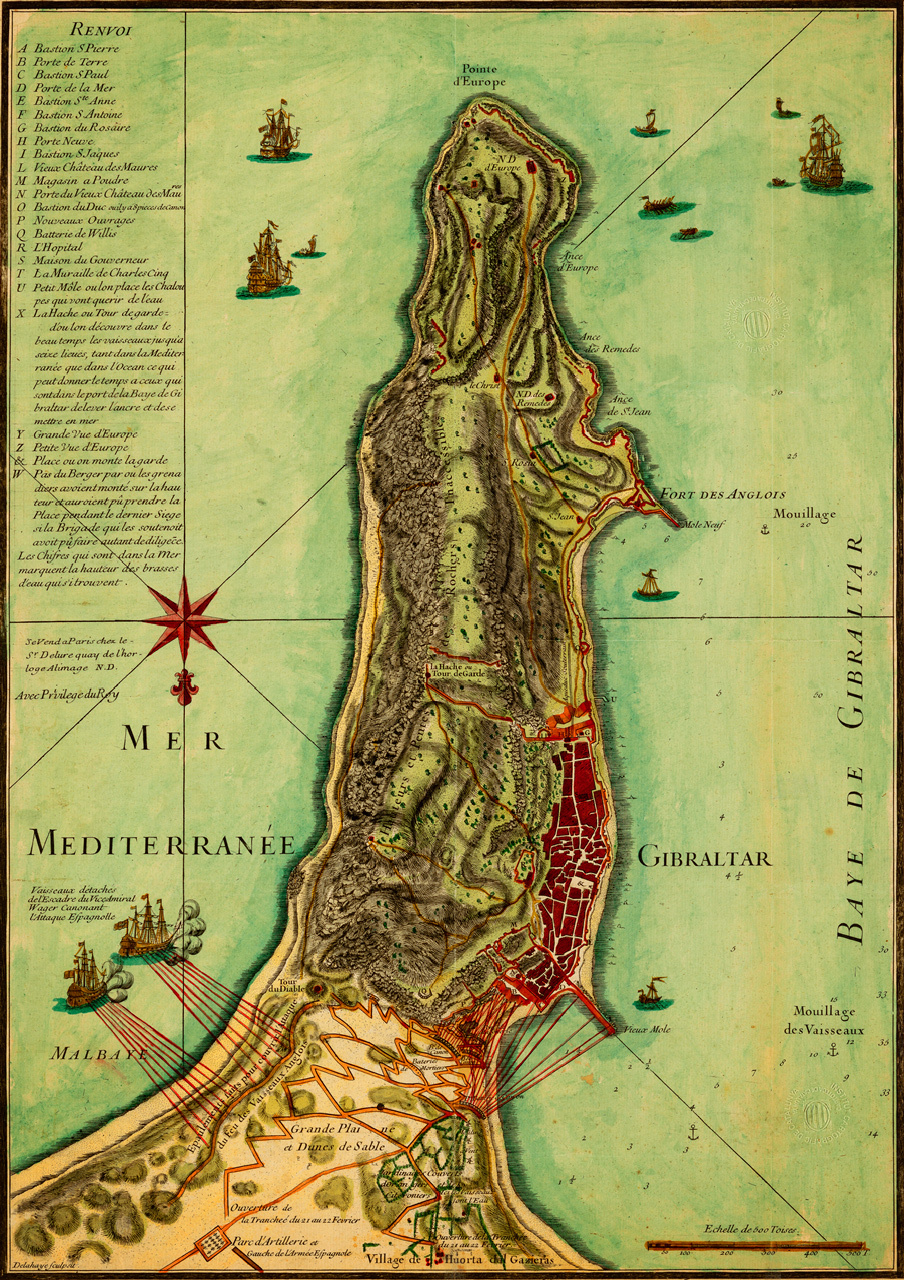
French map of the siege shows British naval bombardments on each side of the peninsula, aimed at Spanish land positions.

Many trees and vines flourished upon the Mountain when the Spaniards attempted to surprise the garrison over the middle hill [1704]; and many continued till the year 1727, when the regiments who were encamped to the southward had leave to cut some for their firing, which they took in its full latitude and levelled almost the whole.

One of the few sorties of the siege occurred just before the arrival of Lord Portmore. An ingenious plan devised by Clayton, it failed due to the gunners acting too soon:

This morn: early 2 Sergeants each having ten Men sally'd out to the very Trenches, call'd to the Enemy and he'd them advance, at the same time gave them two Volleys which was the Signal appointed by the Governor who was on the battery to give the word, but the Gunmen whose business it was to begin, being either drunk or mad, or both, over eager fired away without the sign, and so spoiled the project. The Sergeants did their duty well and allarm'd the whole army and Trenches, so that there was beating to arms immediately, which was what we wanted, for the when they had been form'd in a Body then our guns shoul'd have done great execution, but the Gunner's Rashness let them know the Stratagem so they dispers'd

=== Second heavy bombardment ===
By 7 May (N.S.) de las Torres was ready to launch another heavy bombardment. This caused major damage to the town and batteries, and caused far more British casualties than any earlier point in the siege. S.H. recorded in his journal:

26 April [O.S.] – 'By break of day the Enemy open'd all their batteries, and fired till ten, without intermission. Wounded several and Killed some of our Men... A Ball came, from their Battery, to the new Mole, the place where our ships lie, and carried away the Mast of a Merchantman, which was two Miles Distance.

27 April [O.S.] – 'On our part, since yesterday two O'clock, several men kill'd and wounded, the Houses beaten down by the exceeding hot fire, insomuch it's scarce possible to walk the Streets. A shell broke at the signal house, more went over into the Town, and as far as the South Port. Willis's Battery's in a manner demolished, the Mole half level with the sea, all the cannon but one at Willis's Battery dismounted... They continue their fire with inexpressible fury.

2 May [O.S.] – 'The same hot work all Night ... Two Thousand Balls and Bombs at us, several die of their wounds in our Hospital.

The damage done to the fortifications in one day could be immense:

They dismounted 16 out of the 24 guns at the Old Mole... and demolished all our batteries in an extraordinary manner. At Willis's all the Guns but two dismounted and the cover so beaten down that the men cannot do their duty. Several gunners and soldiers kill'd and wounded.

The recently arrived British reinforcements, however, allowed the garrison to maintain the batteries, re-mount the guns, and return fire. Lord Portmore, in an attempt to boost the morale and productivity of his infantry turned labourers, increased their pay from eight pence to a shilling a day. On 15 May (N.S.), de las Torres, trying to make a point, sent:

A Flag of Truce to the Governor With a Compliment to inform his Lordship that they have not begun the Siege, and that as yet they were only trying their ordinance, tho' they yesterday sent us, most part into the Town, 119 Bombs and near 1500 Balls and keep still a most dreadfull firing.

Nevertheless, the firing from the Spanish guns began to slacken. After several days' continuous fire the Spanish iron cannon began to burst, whilst the better brass cannon began to drop at the muzzle from overheating. The besiegers were also beginning to suffer from a lack of supplies owing to the poor Andalusian roads. 'Another deserter confirms their being in a miserable state of Health, with great want of Water and Provisions.' The garrison, on the other hand, had ample supplies of provisions, guns, and powder from the sea, and soon began to outgun the Spaniards. The Spanish continued to fire upon Gibraltar, but 'S.H.' wrote: 'We laugh at them for Fools to throw away their Powder Ball and Shells, since they neither fright, kill or hurt us.'

== End of hostilities ==
Frustrated with the Count de las Torres's obstinacy and inability to take his advice, the Spanish senior engineer, Veerboom, had left for Madrid. His proposed overland attack from the north failing, de las Torres asked his remaining engineers (Francisco Monteagut and Diego Bordick) for their opinion. Their response was blunt:

Had we found ourselves in such a position as to be worthy of being asked our opinion of the enterprise before the siege began, as we are now to be worthy of being consulted by your Excellency over its prosecution, we would have voted on nothing more than a diversionary tactic overland ... [the geography and defences of Gibraltar] all combine to make a counter-attack so manifestly unbeatable

On 23 June (N.S.) the Spanish offered a truce.

This night a Colonel of Ireland came to the Head of the Prince's Line and called to let them know he had a letter for Lord Portmore, but the commanding officer let him know unless retired they wou'd fire at him [all parleys between the two forces were supposed to come by sea]. Sometime after the same person came out of the zigzag [trenches] beating a chammade and was admitted into the town and deliver'd Lord Portmore's letters from M. Van der Meer, Minister of the States at the Court of Spain with a copy of the preliminary articles signed by the plenipotentiaries of the several powers of the two alliances for a suspension of arms whereupon his Lordship agreed to it and all hostilities ceased on both sides.

The next day a Colonel from the garrison crossed to San Roque, where a truce was agreed. The Spaniards were to remain encamped outside Gibraltar, but hostilities were to cease. An uneasy truce remained until the end of the Anglo-Spanish War in 1729.

== Conditions within Gibraltar ==
In his journal of the siege, the anonymous 'S.H.' painted an interesting portrait of life during the siege. Although life in the garrison was often dangerous and brutish, 'S.H.' nevertheless noted how civilised, in some aspects, eighteenth century warfare could be:

4 days agoe, the Conde de la Torres sent a present of some choice Fish to Admiral Wager, who gave them to the Governor and came to dine.... Lt. Clarke of the Tiger, having been with a message to the Spanish General and had the honour to dine with the Duke of Wharton and Lady Mrs., brought a present of a whole wild boar and a large basket of fish from an officer to Colonel Anstruther. The fish proved to be bad, but the boar was dressed the next day.

However, he also chronicled (if sometimes rather flippantly) the great dangers facing the defenders during the incessant Spanish bombardment.

A Soldier, not three minutes on his Post, must be peeping over the Wall at the Prince's Line, his curiosity cost him his Head, which a Cannon Ball made bold to carry away without leave. Another, just come on Duty, lost his fire lock off his shoulder in the same Manner.

Discipline amongst the troops was harsh, and infractions such as drunkenness common. 'Our Men were put to allowance of a pint of Wine per Day, to prevent their frequent drunkenness.' 'S.H.' also blamed the failure of the sortie on 28 April (NS) on the drunkenness of the gunners. Although deserters from the Spanish force were welcomed warmly, attempts at desertion by British soldiers were dealt with harshly. After the siege a Cameronian was caught trying to escape to the Spanish lines:

There was found on him a Plan or description of the Strengths and Weaknesses of the Garrison ... He was condemned to have a halter put about his neck, to be whipped under the gallows at the new mole, Southport and Market Place and Water Port – in all 500 lashes by the common hangman. After which he was drummed out of town with the Rouge's march, a rope about his neck, then naked as he was, put on board a ship designed for the West Indies, there to be put on shore as a slave on the plantations never to be redeemed.

Life was also hard for the civilian population. The 400 Spaniards in Gibraltar had been expelled at the beginning of the siege, leaving around 200 adult male Genoese and 100 adult male Jews to help with the defence. 'S.H.' recorded that 'A body of the Jews desire leave to retire to Barbary, because commanded to work for the common Preservation, but answer'd by the Governor that as they had enjoy'd safe and plenty during Peace, if they will not assist for their own safety, they shall be turned over to the Spaniard.' However, another diarist of the siege indicated that the Gibraltarian Jews earned their salt as much as anyone else:

...the Jews were not a little serviceable, they wrought in the most indefatigable manner and spared no pains where they could be of any advantage either in the siege or after it.

Punishments for non-combatants could also be harsh. Female transgressors of the correct codes were forced to endure the 'whirligig'.

A poor Lady, by name Chidley, confin'd to the Black Hole, or Dungeon, for the space of a Night, but next day, to make her some amends for her want of company, she was most formally conducted to a pretty Whim or Whirligig, in form of a Bird Cage, for the greater benefit of air. It contains Room enough for one person, and tho' in length it be ten foot, yet, by the narrowness, I find it does not answer our old saying of "it's as broad as it's long." It is fixed between two swivels, so is turn'd round till it makes the person, if not us'd very gently, a little giddy and Land Sick. This Office was performed by two of the private Gentlemen of the Garrison, for the space of an hour in the Market Place, being well attended. All this was to oblige her for the following good qualities, which she had the goodness to make frequent use of such as giving soft words in smooth language, beating better manners into several men and a too frequent bestowing of her other favours.

This is far more gruesome than 'S.H.' makes clear, for whilst he tactfully wrote that it made the victim a little 'giddy' and 'land sick', George Hills has bluntly noted that 'In fact the centrifugal action caused the victim to empty through every orifice.' Another contemporary source recounted the gruesome way in which two Moorish spies were displayed after their execution:

Two Moors, the chief agents of the Spaniards, were found guilty, and were put to death and afterwards flayed; their skins were nailed to the gates of the town, where they appeared in the same proportion as when alive, and being large, gigantic fellows, as the Moors in general are, they were horrid ghastly spectacles.

== See also ==
- Great Siege of Gibraltar
- History of Gibraltar
