= Cristóbal de Moscoso y Montemayor =

Spanish noble and military (–1749)

Cristóbal de Moscoso y Montemayor (died 27 January 1749 in Madrid), also known as the Count de las Torres, was a Spanish noble and military officer.

He was the first Count of Las Torres de Alcorrín (1683). King Philip V of Spain made him Viceroy of Valencia in 1706, where he fought without success against the Allies.

In 1723, he became Viceroy of Navarre.

In 1727, he led the Spanish troops in the unsuccessful Thirteenth Siege of Gibraltar. Despite the failure, he was made Marquis de Cullera, and in 1728, Duke d’Algete and a Grandee of Spain.
