= Spanish treasure fleet =

Convoy system used by the Spanish Empire from 1566 to 1790

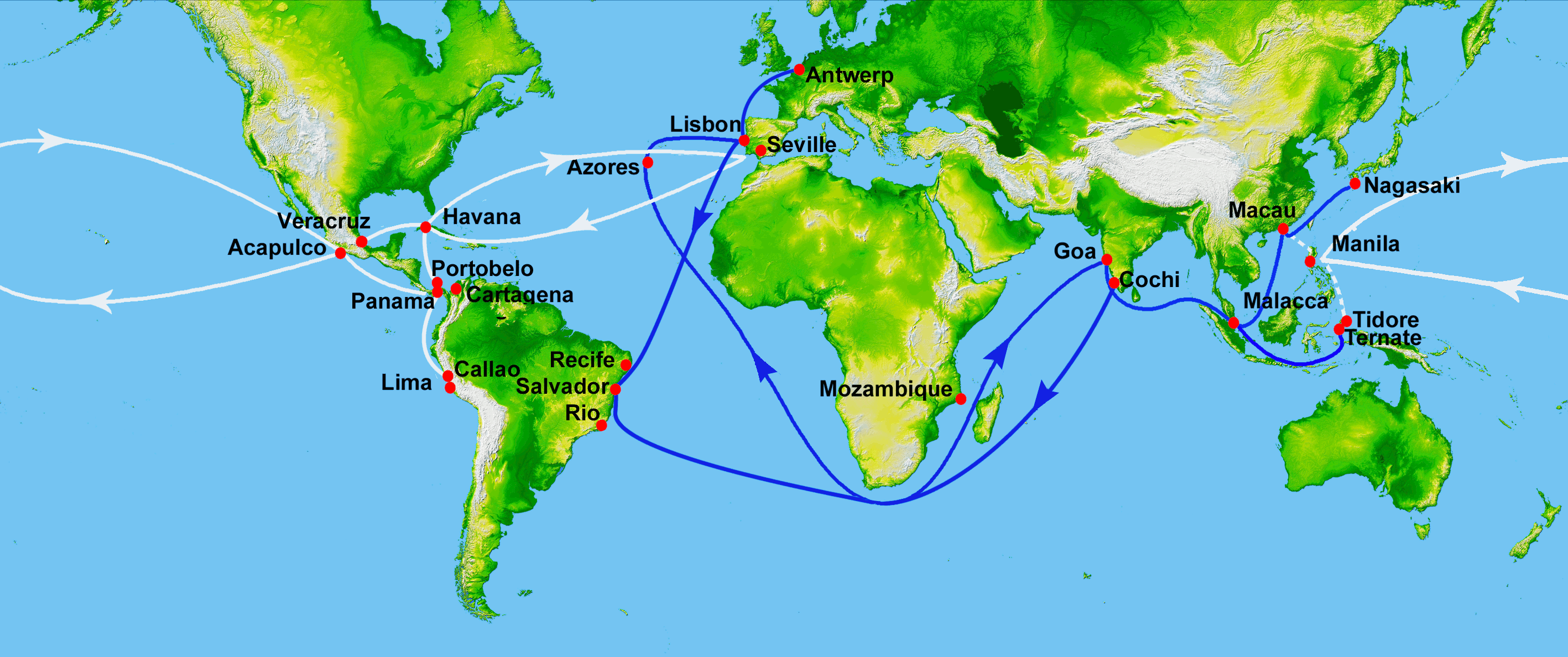
Spanish galleon routes (white): West Indies or trans-atlantic route begun in 1492, Manila galleon or trans-pacific route begun in 1565 (Blue: Portuguese routes, operational from 1498 to 1640).

The Spanish treasure fleet, or West Indies Fleet (Spanish: Flota de Indias, also called silver fleet or plate fleet; from the Spanish: plata meaning "silver"), was a convoy system of sea routes organized by the Spanish Empire from 1566 to 1790, which linked Spain with its territories in the Americas across the Atlantic. The convoys were general purpose cargo fleets used for transporting a wide variety of items, including agricultural goods, lumber, various metal resources such as silver and gold, gems, pearls, spices, sugar, tobacco, silk, and other exotic goods from the overseas territories of the Spanish Empire to the Spanish mainland. Spanish goods such as oil, wine, textiles, books, and tools were transported in the opposite direction.

The West Indies fleet was the first permanent transatlantic trade route in history. Similarly, the related Manila galleon trade was the first permanent trade route across the Pacific. The Spanish West and East Indies fleets are considered among the most successful naval operations in history and, from a commercial point of view, they made possible key components of today's global economy.

== History ==
=== Origin ===
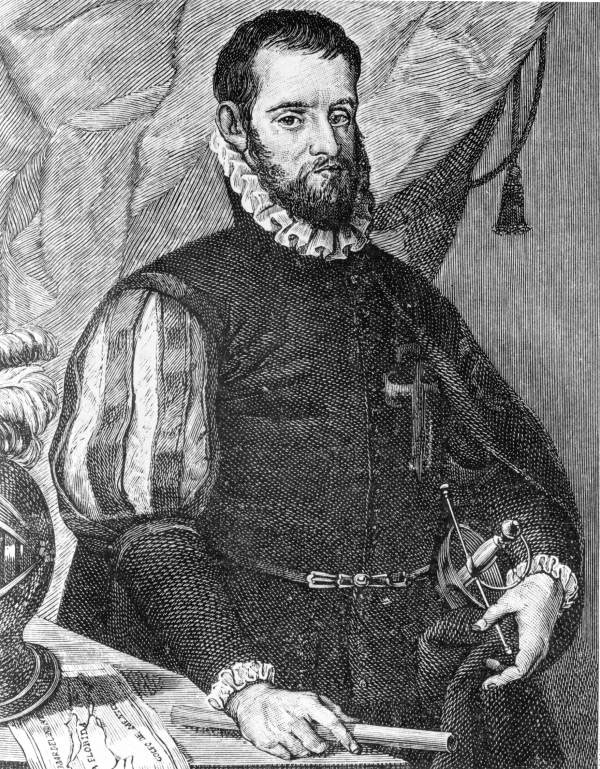
Pedro Menéndez de Avilés, admiral and designer of the treasure fleet system

Spanish ships had carried goods from the New World since Christopher Columbus's first expedition of 1492. The organised system of convoys dates from 1564, but Spain sought to protect shipping prior to that by organising protection around the largest Caribbean island, Cuba, and the maritime region of southern Spain and the Canary Islands because of attacks by pirates and foreign navies. In the 1560s, the Spanish government created a system of convoys in response to the sacking of Havana by French privateers.

The main procedures were first proposed by admiral and shipbuilder Bernardino de Mendoza in the age of Holy Roman Emperor Charles V. They were later established on the recommendations of Pedro Menéndez de Avilés, another experienced admiral and personal adviser of King Philip II. The treasure fleets sailed along two sea lanes. The main one was the Caribbean Spanish West Indies fleet or Flota de Indias, which departed in two convoys from Seville, where the Casa de Contratación was based, bound for ports such as Veracruz, Portobelo, and Cartagena before making a rendezvous at Havana in order to return together to Spain. A secondary route was that of the Manila Galleons or Galeón de Manila, which linked the Philippines to Acapulco in Mexico across the Pacific Ocean. From Acapulco, the Asian goods were transhipped by mule train to Veracruz to be loaded onto the Caribbean treasure fleet for shipment to Spain. To better defend this trade, Pedro Menéndez de Avilés and Álvaro de Bazán designed the definitive model of the galleon in the 1550s.

=== Casa de Contratación ===
Spain claimed most of the Pacific Ocean as its mare clausum during the Age of Discovery.

Spain controlled the trade through the Casa de Contratación based in Seville, a river port in southern Spain. By law, the colonies could trade only with Seville, the one designated port in the mother country. Maritime archaeology has shown that the quantity of goods transported was sometimes higher than that recorded at the Archivo General de Indias. Spanish merchants and Spaniards acting as fronts (cargadores) for foreign merchants sent their goods on these fleets to the New World. Some resorted to contraband to transport their cargoes untaxed. The Crown of Spain taxed the wares and precious metals of private merchants at a rate of 20%, a tax known as the quinto real or royal fifth.

By the end of the 16th century, Spain became the richest country in Europe. Much of the wealth from this trade was used by the Spanish Habsburgs to finance armies to protect its European territories in the 16th and 17th centuries against the Ottoman Empire and most of the major European powers. The flow of precious metals in and out of Spain also stimulated the European economy as a whole.

The flow of precious metals made many traders wealthy, both in Spain and abroad. As a result of the discovery of precious metals in Spanish America, Spain's money supply increased tenfold. The increase in gold and silver on the Iberian market caused high inflation in the 17th century, affecting the Spanish economy. As a consequence, the Crown was forced to delay the payment of some major debts, which had negative consequences for its creditors, mostly foreign bankers. By 1690 some of these creditors could no longer offer financial support to the Crown. The Spanish monopoly over its West and East Indies colonies lasted for over two centuries.

=== Decline, revival and abolition ===
The economic importance of exports later declined with the drop in production of the American precious metal mines, such as Potosí. However, the growth in trade was strong in the early years. Numbering 17 ships in 1550, the fleets expanded to more than 50 much larger vessels by the end of the century. By the second half of the 17th century, that number had dwindled to less than half of its peak. As economic conditions gradually recovered from the last decades of the 17th century, fleet operations slowly expanded again, once again becoming prominent during the reign of the Bourbons in the 18th century.

The Spanish trade of goods was sometimes threatened by its colonial rivals, who tried to seize islands as bases along the Spanish Main and in the Spanish West Indies. However, the Atlantic trade was largely unharmed. The English acquired small islands like St Kitts in 1624; expelled in 1629, they returned in 1639 and seized Jamaica in 1655. French pirates established themselves in Saint-Domingue in 1625, were expelled, only to return later, and the Dutch occupied Curaçao in 1634. Other losses to foreign powers came later. In 1713 as part of the Treaty of Utrecht after the War of the Spanish Succession, the Spanish crown was forced to make concessions, which included granting trading privileges to Britain that ended the previous Spanish monopoly on legal trade to its colonial holdings. In 1739 during the War of Jenkins' Ear, the British admirals Francis Hosier and later Edward Vernon blockaded Portobello in an attempt to prevent the return sailing of the treasure fleet. In 1741, Vernon's campaign against Cartagena de Indias ended in defeat, with high losses of men and ships. Spain dealt with the temporary British seizures of Havana and Manila (1762–4), during the Seven Years' War, by using a larger number of smaller fleets visiting a greater variety of ports.

The end of the War of the Spanish Succession in 1713 marked the beginning of the rule of the Bourbon dynasty over the Spanish Empire, which brought with it the Bourbon Reforms. These reforms, designed to halt Spain's decline and increase tax revenue, resulted in a series of changes to the fleet system throughout the 18th century. Philip V began the reforms by sending investigators to report on conditions in Spanish America, who brought back evidence of fraud. He and following Bourbon kings, notably including Charles III, would make a concerted effort to centralize the administration of Spanish America and more efficiently tax profits from overseas trade. One of these reforms was the granting of trading monopolies for certain regions to trading companies ran by peninsulares, such as the Guipuzcoan Company. Another involved the increased use of registered ships, or navíos de registro, travelling solo outside the fleet system to transport goods. These reforms gradually decreased reliance on the escorted convoys of the fleet system. In the 1780s, Spain opened its colonies to freer trade. In 1790, the Casa de Contratación was abolished, bringing to an end the great general purpose cargo convoys. Thereafter small groups of naval frigates were assigned specifically to transferring bullion as required.

== The fleets ==
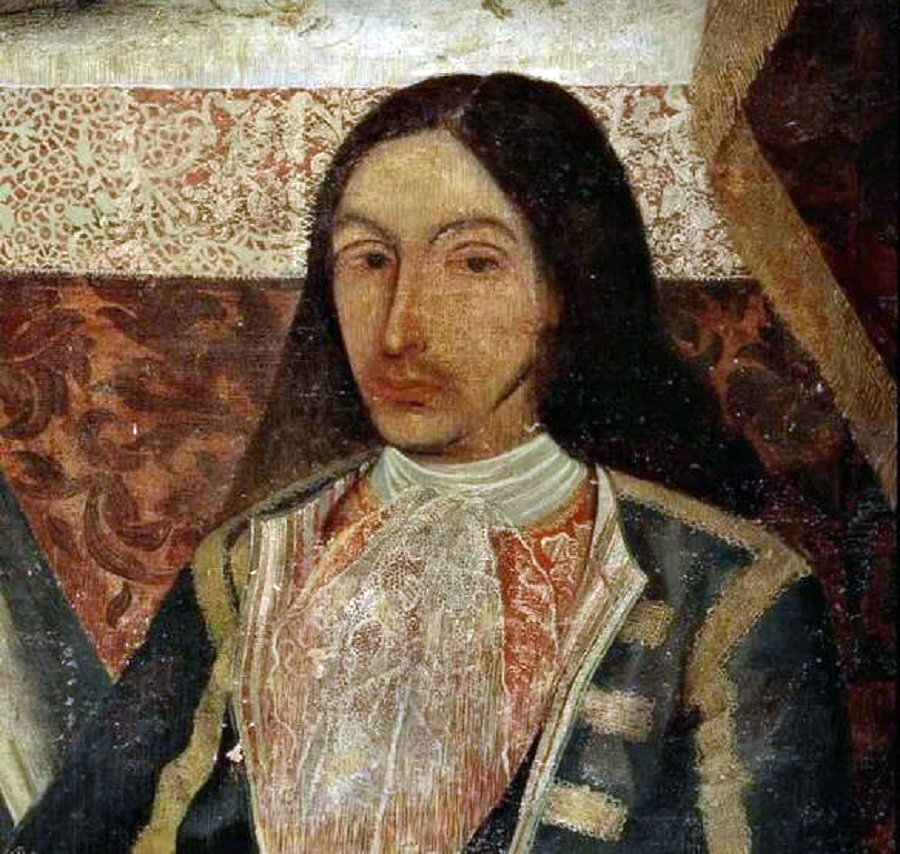
The Spaniard Amaro Pargo, a corsair and merchant, participated in the West Indies Fleet.

Every year, two fleets left Spain loaded with European goods in demand in Spanish America; they were guarded by military vessels. Valuable cargo from the Americas, most significantly silver from Mexico and Peru, were sent back to Spain. Fleets of fifty or more ships sailed from Spain, one bound for the Mexican port of Veracruz and the other for Panama and Cartagena. From the Spanish ports of Seville or Cádiz, the two fleets bound for the Americas sailed together down the coast of Africa, and stopped at the Spanish territory of the Canary Islands for provisions before the voyage across the Atlantic. Once the two fleets reached the Caribbean, the fleets separated. The New Spain fleet sailed to Veracruz in Mexico to load not only silver and the valuable red dye cochineal, but also porcelain and silk shipped from China on the Manila galleons. The Asian goods were carried overland from Acapulco to Veracruz by mule train.

The Tierra Firme fleet, or galeones, sailed to Cartagena to load South American products, especially silver from Potosí. Some ships went to Portobello on the Caribbean coast of Panama to load Peruvian silver. This had been shipped from the Pacific coast port of Callao and transported across the isthmus of Panama by mule. Other ships went to the Caribbean island of Margarita, off the coast of Venezuela, to collect pearls which had been harvested from offshore oyster beds. After loading was complete, both fleets sailed for Havana, Cuba, to rendezvous for the journey back to Spain.

The overland journey by mule train, as well as supplies provided by local farmers to prepare the fleets for long ocean voyages, invigorated the economy of colonial Spanish America. Preparation and the transport of goods required porters, innkeepers, and foodstuffs to help facilitate travel. However, in Mexico in 1635, there was an increase of the sales tax levied to finance the fleet, the Armada de Barlovento.

Between 1703 and 1705 Spanish corsair Amaro Pargo began to participate in the West Indies Fleet. In this period he was the owner and captain of the frigate El Ave María y Las Ánimas, a ship which he sailed from the port of Santa Cruz de Tenerife to Havana. He reinvested the benefits of the Canarian-American trade in his estates, devoted to the cultivation of the grapevines of Malvasía and Vidueño, whose wine products (mainly Vidueño) were sent to America.

== The flow of Spanish treasure ==
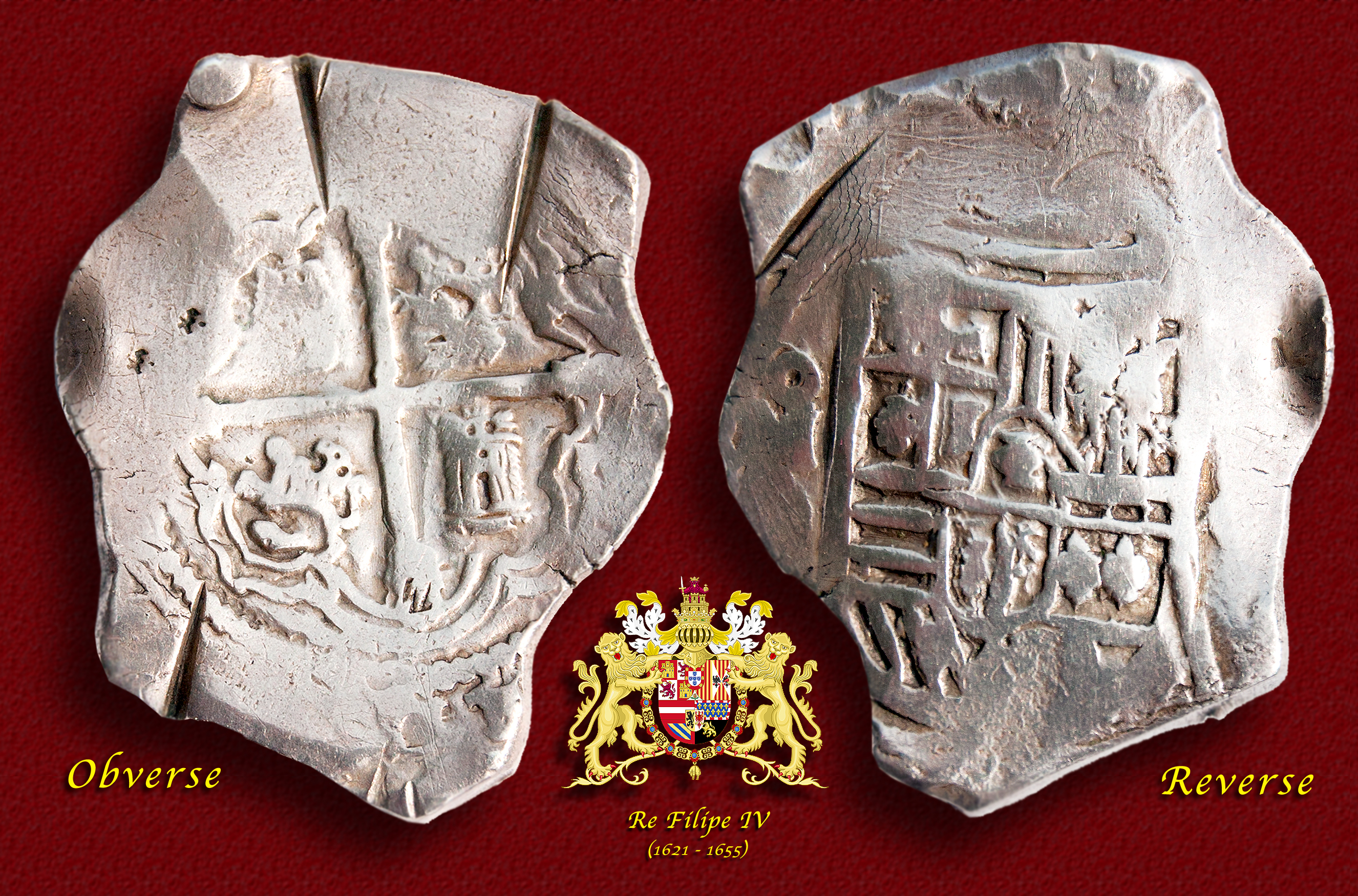
A silver 8-reales (peso) coin minted in México (1621–65).

Walton gives the following figures in pesos. For the 300-year period the peso or piece of eight had about 25 grams of silver, about the same as the German thaler and Dutch rijksdaalder. A single galleon might carry 2 million pesos. The modern approximate value of the estimated 4 billion pesos produced during the period would come to US$530 billion or €470 billion (based on silver bullion prices of May 2015). Of the 4 billion pesos produced, 2.5 billion was shipped to Europe, of which 500 million was shipped around Africa to Asia. Of the remaining 1.5 billion, 650 million went directly to Asia from Acapulco, and 850 million remained in the Western Hemisphere. Little of the wealth stayed in Spain. Of the 11 million arriving in 1590, 2 million went to France for imports, 6 million to Italy for imports and military expenses, of which 2.5 went up the Spanish Road to the Low Countries, and 1 million to the Ottoman Empire. 1.5 million was shipped from Portugal to Asia. Of the 2 million pesos reaching the Dutch Republic in that year, 75% went to the Baltic for naval stores and 25% went to Asia. The income of the Spanish crown from all sources was about 2.5 million pesos in 1550, 14 million in the 1590s, about 15 million in 1760, and 30 million in 1780. In 1665 the debts of the Spanish crown were 30 million pesos short-term and 300 million long-term.

Most of the New World production was silver, but Colombian mines produced mostly gold. The following table gives the estimated legal production. It necessarily excludes smuggling, which was increasingly important after 1600. The crown legally took one fifth (quinto real) at the source and obtained more through other taxes.

Estimated legal treasure flow in pesos per year
From	To	1550	1600	1700	1790
Peru	Havana	1,650,000	8,000,000	4,500,000	minor
Colombia	Havana	500,000	1,500,000	1,500,000	2,000,000
México	Havana	850,000	1,500,000	3,000,000	18,000,000
Havana	Spain	3,000,000	11,000,000	9,000,000	20,000,000
Europe	Asia	2,000,000	1,500,000	4,500,000	7,000,000
Peru	Acapulco	–	3,500,000	?	?
Acapulco	Philippines	–	5,000,000	2,000,000	3,000,000

== Losses ==
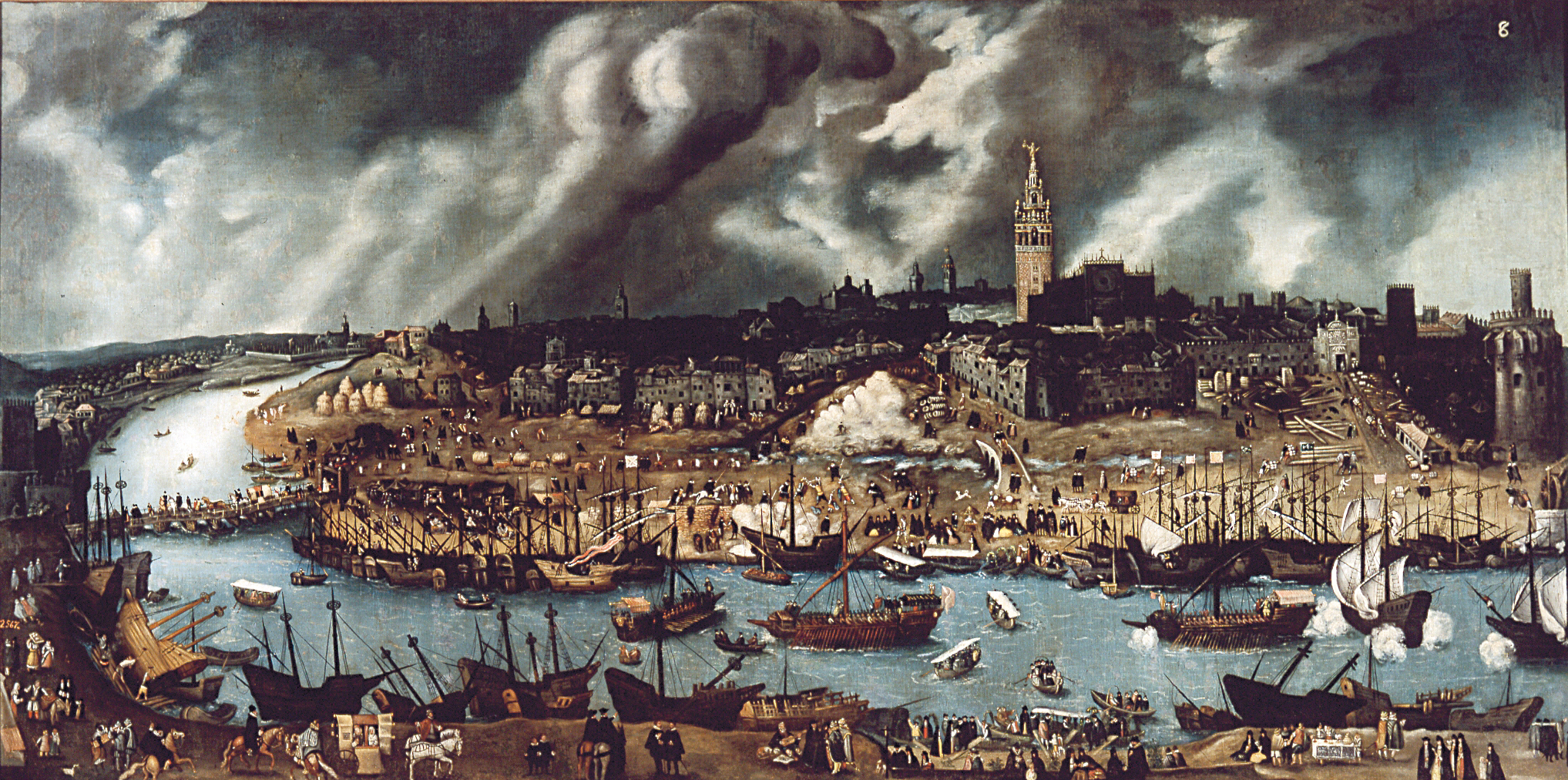
A shipyard on the river Guadalquivir in 16th century Seville, by Alonso Sánchez Coello

Despite the general perception that many Spanish galleons were captured by foreign privateers and pirates, relatively few ships were lost to Spain's enemies in the course of the flota's two and a half centuries of operation; more flota galleons were lost to hurricanes. Only the Dutch WIC admiral Piet Hein managed to capture an entire fleet, in the Battle in the Bay of Matanzas in 1628, after which its cargo was taken to the Dutch Republic. The English admiral Robert Blake twice attacked the fleet, in the Battle of Cádiz in 1656 and in the Battle of Santa Cruz de Tenerife in 1657, but he captured only a single galleon and Spanish officers managed to prevent most of the silver from falling into English hands.

The West Indies fleet was destroyed in the Battle of Vigo Bay in 1702 during the War of the Spanish Succession, when it was surprised in port unloading its goods, but the Spanish sailors had already unloaded most of its cargo, including all of its silver. None of these attacks took place in open seas. In the case of the Manila galleons, only four were ever captured by British warships: the Santa Anna by Thomas Cavendish in 1589, the Encarnación by Woodes Rogers in 1709, the Covadonga by George Anson in 1743, and the Santísima Trinidad in 1762. The attempts to take the Rosario in 1704 and the Begonia in 1710 were foiled.

== Famous shipwrecks ==
Wrecks of Spanish treasure ships, whether sunk in naval combat or, as was more usually the case, by storms (with the ones which occurred in 1622, 1715, 1733, and 1750, being among the worst), are a prime target for modern treasure hunters. Many, such as the Nuestra Señora de Atocha and the Santa Margarita, have been salvaged. In August 1750, at least three Spanish merchantmen ran aground in North Carolina during a hurricane. The El Salvador sank near Cape Lookout, the Nuestra Señora De Soledad went ashore near present-day Core Banks and the Nuestra Señora De Guadalupe went ashore near present-day Ocracoke.

=== Treasure ship Encarnación ===
The wreck of the Spanish merchant ship Encarnación, part of the Tierra Firme fleet, was discovered in 2011 with much of its cargo still aboard and part of its hull intact. The Encarnación sank in 1681 during a storm near the mouth of the Chagres River on the Caribbean side of Panama. The Encarnación sank in less than 12 m (40 ft) of water. The remains of the Urca de Lima from the 1715 fleet and the San Pedro from the 1733 fleet, after being found by treasure hunters, are now protected as Florida Underwater Archaeological Preserves.

=== Capitana ===
The Capitana (El Rubi) was the flagship of the 1733 fleet; it ran aground during a hurricane near Upper Matecumbe Key, then sank. Three men died during the storm. Afterward, divers recovered most of the treasure aboard.

The Capitana was the first of the 1733 ships to be found again in 1938. Salvage workers recovered items from the sunken ship over more than 10 years. Additional gold was recovered in June 2015. The ship's location: is 24° 55.491' north, 80° 30.891' west.

=== San José ===
The San José was sunk in 1708 by British forces near Colombia's coast. Its wreckage was discovered in 2015 and is believed to contain the record US$17B in gold, silver, and other precious stones. Its place is a national secret. In November 2023 the Colombian government is looking to recover the treasure.

=== Nuestra Señora de las Maravillas ===
The Nuestra Señora de las Maravillas, 'Our Lady of Miracles', which had collided with another ship in the fleet suffered damage to its hull and sunk into a coral reef off the Bahamas in January 1656. The ship's cargo with almost 3.5 million items was recovered between 1650s and 1990s, while latest discoveries would be exhibited at the Bahamas Maritime Museum.

== See also ==
- Asiento de Negros
- Álvaro de Bazán
- List of Atlantic hurricanes before 1600
- Luis Fajardo
- Manila galleon
- Piracy in the Caribbean
- Portuguese India Armadas
- San Esteban
