= Portobelo =

- Corregimiento and city
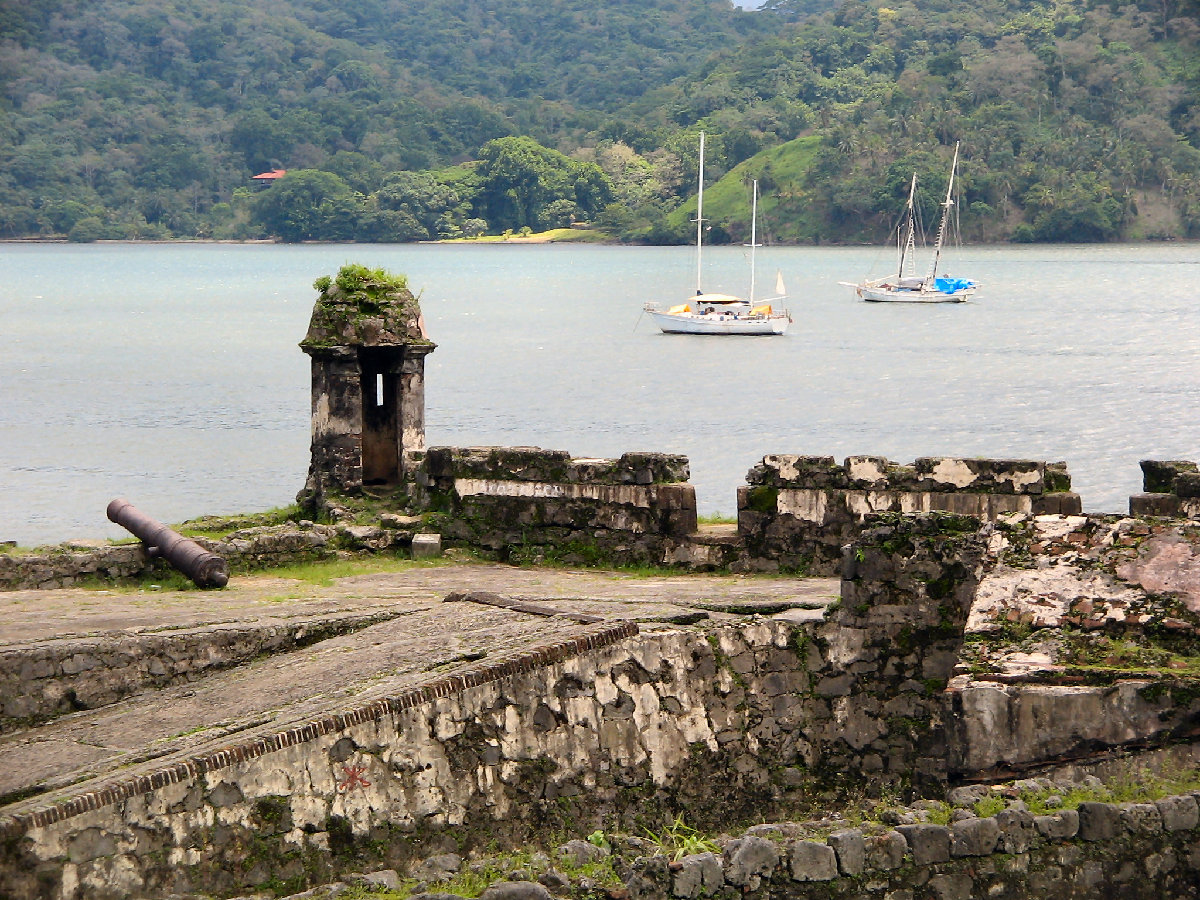
- Portobelo bay and ruins of Spanish fortifications

- Location within Panama
- Coordinates: 09°33′16″N 79°39′18″W
- Country: Panama
- Province: Colón
- District: Portobelo
- Founded: 1597
- Founder: Francisco Velarde y Mercado

Area
  - Land: 244.7 km^{2} (94.5 sq mi)

Population (2010)
  - Total: 4,559
  - Density: 18.6/km^{2} (48/sq mi)
- Population density calculated based on land area.
- Time zone: UTC−5 (EST)
- Climate: Am

Portobelo (Modern Spanish: "Puerto Bello" ("beautiful port"), historically in Portuguese: Porto Belo) is a historic port and corregimiento in Portobelo District, Colón Province, Panama. Located on the northern part of the Isthmus of Panama, it is 32 km (20 mi) northeast of the modern port of Colón now at the Atlantic entrance to the Panama Canal. It has a population of 4,559 as of 2010, and functions as the seat of Portobelo District.

Established in 1597 for its deep natural harbor, it joined Veracruz (2,066 km (1,284 mi) to the northwest) as ports used by the Spanish Empire to ship treasure from the mines of Peru (via Panama City on the Pacific side of the Isthmus and overland to Portobelo) back to Spain. The city was repeatedly captured by British privateers and pirates, culminating in a successful siege by the Royal Navy in 1739, during the War of Jenkins' Ear.

Its economy received a major boost in the late-19th century during the construction of the Panama Canal. In 1980, UNESCO designated the Fortifications on the Caribbean Side of Panama: Portobelo-San Lorenzo, including the ruins of the Spanish colonial fortifications and nearby Fort San Lorenzo, as a World Heritage Site.

== History ==
Portobelo was founded in 1597 by Spanish explorer Francisco Velarde y Mercado and quickly replaced Nombre de Dios as the major local port for Peruvian silver. Legend has it that Christopher Columbus originally named the port "Puerto Bello", meaning "Beautiful Port", in 1502. After the English privateer Francis Drake died of dysentery in 1596, he was buried at sea in a lead coffin off Portobelo, memorialised by the present Isla Drake ("Drake Island") at the mouth of the harbour. During the 16th to the 18th centuries it was an important silver-exporting port in New Granada on the Spanish Main and one of the two Atlantic ports on the route of the Spanish treasure fleet. The Spanish built defensive fortifications at Portobelo to protect it from attacks by other European powers. In 1601, English privateers led by William Parker captured Portobelo from the Spanish. The Welsh privateer Henry Morgan repeated the feat in 1668, having led a force of 450 privateers and overcame its strong fortifications. His forces plundered it for 14 days before withdrawing. It was captured again in 1680 by the English pirate John Coxon.

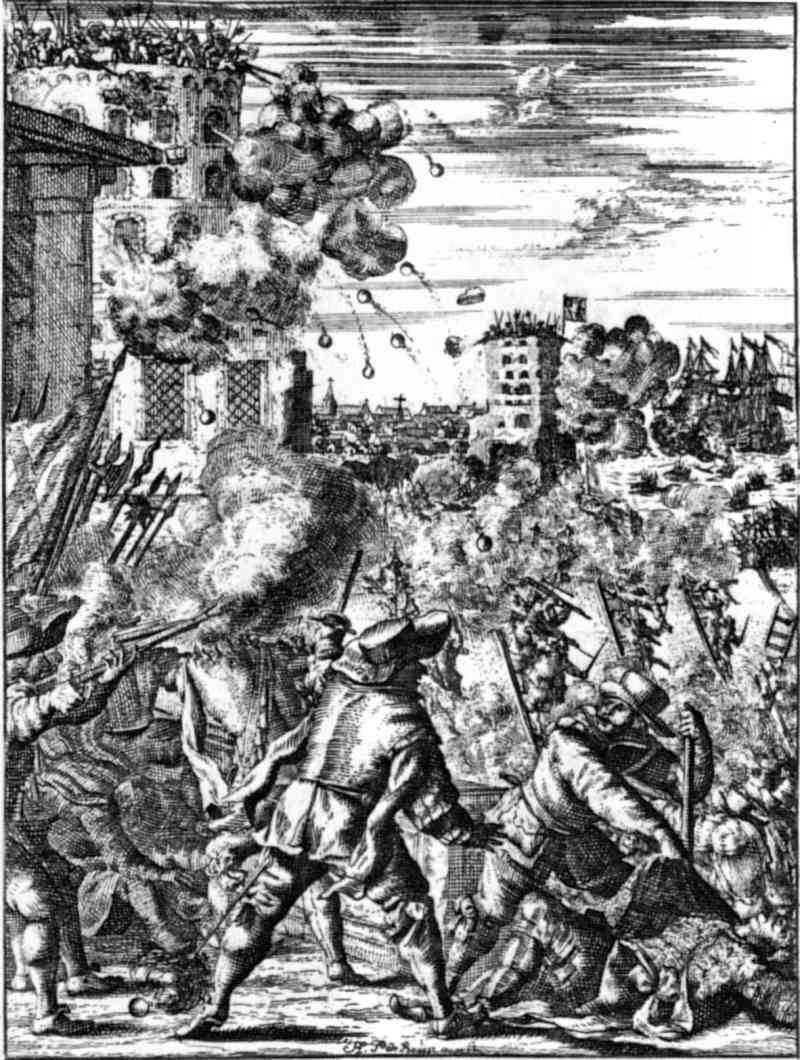
An illustration of Henry Morgan's attack on the Castillo de San Jerónimo, Porto Bello in 1669

In 1726, the Royal Navy initiated a blockade of Porto Bello under Admiral Francis Hosier in an attempt to prevent the Spanish treasure fleet returning to Spain. Hosier's fleet spent an extended period of time moored at Bastimentos 11 km (6.8 mi) to the northeast, during which time Hosier and many of his fleet's sailors died from tropical diseases. 13 years later, the port was captured on 21 November 1739 by a British squadron under Admiral Edward Vernon during the War of Jenkins' Ear. The victory created an outburst of popular acclaim throughout the British Empire. More medals were struck for Vernon than for any other 18th-century British figure and across the British Isles the name of "Portobello" was given to places and streets in honor of the victory, most notably Portobello Road in London, the district of Portobello in Edinburgh and the Portobello Barracks in Dublin.

The Spanish eventually recovered Portobelo in 1741 after their victory at the Battle of Cartagena de Indias. British efforts to gain a foothold on the Spanish Main and disrupt the galleon trade were ultimately fruitless. Following the War of Jenkins' Ear, the Spanish switched from using large fleets calling at few ports to small fleets trading at a wide variety of ports, developing a flexibility that made them less subject to attack. Ships also began to travel around Cape Horn to trade directly at ports on the western coast.

== Today ==
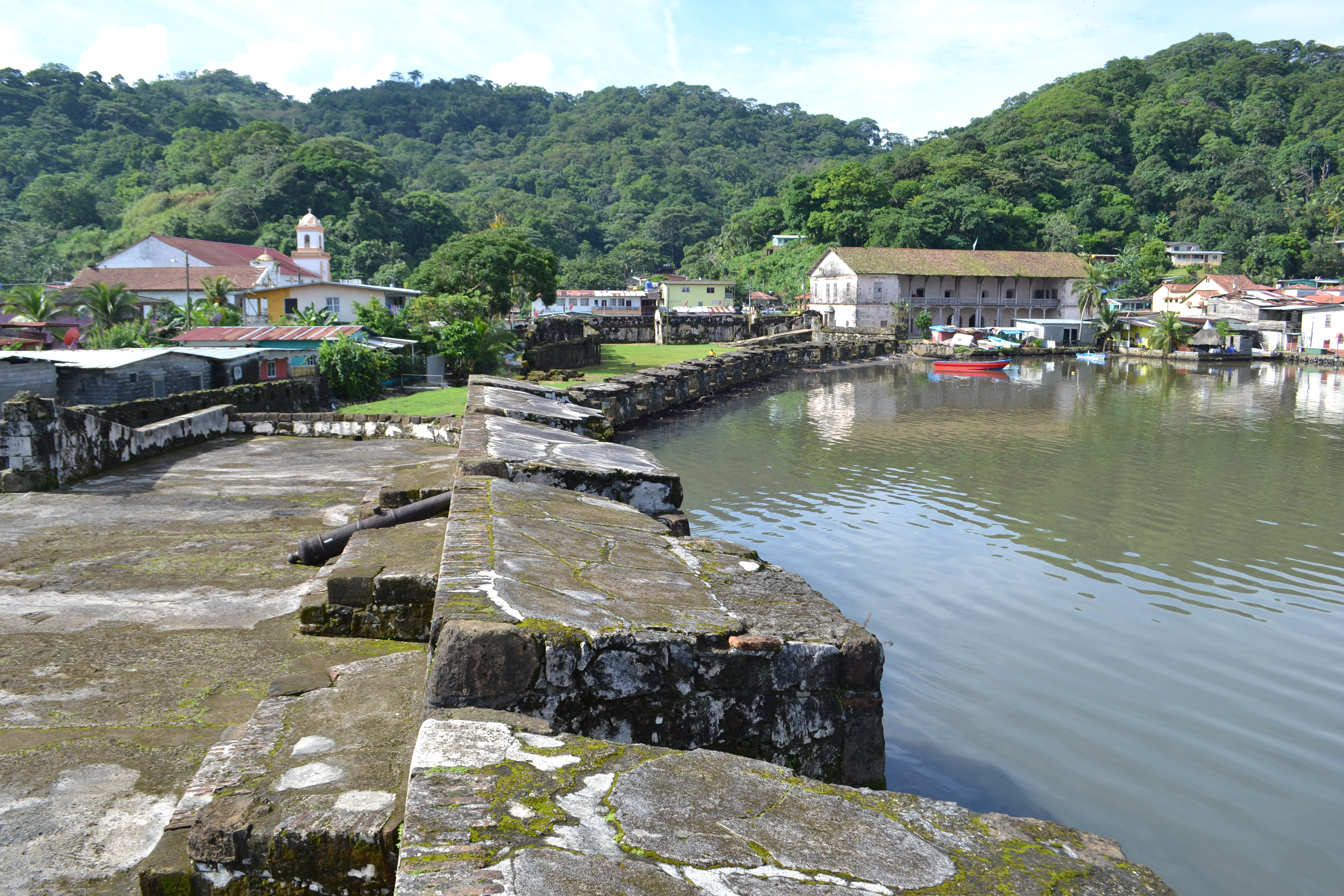
View of the fort, the Aduana building, and the church

The population of Portobelo in 1990 was 3,058 and in 2000 was 3,867. In July 2012 the UNESCO World Heritage Committee placed Portobelo and nearby Fort San Lorenzo on the List of World Heritage in Danger, inscribed as Fortifications on the Caribbean Side of Panama: Portobelo-San Lorenzo, citing environmental factors, lack of maintenance, and uncontrolled urban developments.

In London the Portobello Road is a famous street market, dating back to the 19th century with millions of visitors each year.

== See also ==
- Iglesia de San Felipe
- Portobello, Edinburgh
- Portobello, Dublin
- Portobello Road, London

== Bibliography ==
- Rodger, N. A. M. The Command of the Ocean: A Naval History of Britain, 1649-1815.
