= Francis Hosier =

Royal Navy officer (c.1673–1727)

Vice-Admiral Francis Hosier
- Born: c. 1673
- Died: 1727; At sea, off Vera Cruz
- Burial place: St. Nicholas, Deptford
- Spouse: Diana Pritchard
- Military career
- Allegiance: England; Great Britain
- Branch: Royal Navy
- Rank: Vice admiral
- Commands: Jamaica Station
- Conflicts: Nine Years' War; Anglo-Spanish War

Vice-Admiral Francis Hosier (c. 1673 – 1727) was a Royal Navy officer. He was a lieutenant on George Rooke's flagship at the Battle of Barfleur in 1693. He captured the Heureux off Cape Clear in 1710 and distinguished himself in action with the Spanish off Cartagena in 1711. He is chiefly remembered, however, for his role in the failure of the Blockade of Porto Bello, for which poor Government orders were largely responsible, during which he died of disease alongside thousands of his sailors.

== Career ==
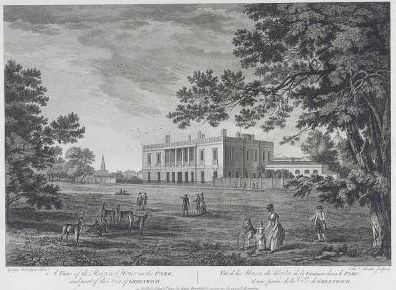
The Ranger's House, Greenwich. by George Robertson,1791. Built about 1700–20 for Captain Francis Hosier. National Maritime Museum, London. (PT2659)

Hosier was the son of the Clerk of the Cheque (and Muster-Master) to Samuel Pepys, who lived at the foot of Crooms Hill, Greenwich. A certain Francis Hosier was the Storekeeper at Deptford in 1684, earning a salary of £305, the highest paid at the Depot. He became a lieutenant in the navy in 1692, when he was appointed to the Winchelsea, a 32-gun new frigate, after being in that station on board different ships for four years.

Captain Francis Hosier was only 26 years old in 1699, when he arranged for the Greenwich residence today known as The Ranger's House to be built, by which time he had commanded only one ship, the Winchelsea, of 74 guns. In 1710, he was appointed captain of the Salisbury upon a cruise off Cape Clear when, falling in with a 6-gun French ship, he was able to capture the French vessel which was then renamed the Salisbury's Prize and taken into service.

In 1719, he was appointed second captain of the Dorsetshire, advanced to be rear-admiral of the white squadron, and afterwards promoted to be vice-admiral of the blue, but the fleet was ordered to be dismantled before it was put to the sea. In 1720, he was appointed second captain of the Dorsetshire with the honorary rank of rear-admiral of the blue squadron. After the War of the Spanish Succession, he was suspended as a suspected Jacobite until 1717, but became vice-admiral in 1723.

On the basis of his letters to the general in command of Porto Bello he was described as a "mere rough, vulgar Tarr" who could not compose a comprehensible letter in English. Dr Houstoun reports that "had a School-boy under my Care wrote such letters, I would have ordered him to be whipt." "The Admiral corresponded in his own Hand, but wrote great Nonsense, and never a word was right spelt..." He used to commit the Admiral's Letters to his first lieutenant, "who made them greater Nonsense, if possible, than they were before."

== Blockade of Porto Bello ==
Location of Porto Bello in Panama

In March 1726, Hosier was sent to command a squadron on the Jamaica Station with orders to prevent Spain from shipping its treasures home. Viscount Townshend, Secretary of State, consulted the former privateer Woodes Rogers, who was in London at the time, as to the probable means and route the Spaniards would adopt to get their treasure home. From past experience Rogers probably knew more than any other person then in England of the favoured Spanish tactics for evading detection. A report dated 10 November 1726, was delivered, in conjunction with Capt. Jonathan Denniss, (Note: Probably the same Capt. Denniss who in 1718 conducted an expedition to Havana, the proceedings of which are in PRO CO 137,13; Denniss was also associated with Leonard Cocke, a factor of the South Sea Co. in Santiago de Cuba. (PRO SP36/25)) to prepare Hosier for his task. At first Hosier met with success in his Blockade of Porto Bello. However, under strict orders not to attempt a capture of the town, which he could without difficulty have achieved with his 20 ships, he was forced to loiter and cruise off a mosquito infested coast. Yellow fever broke out and Hosier himself died of the fever (or as is said by some contemporary commentators "of a broken heart"), whilst on the Breda off Vera Cruz, as did between 3,000 and 4,000 of his sailors. Eventually, during the 1730s, the government appeasement policies of men like Walpole, and not Hosier personally, were blamed for the disaster. The episode is described as follows in Percy's Reliques of 1765.

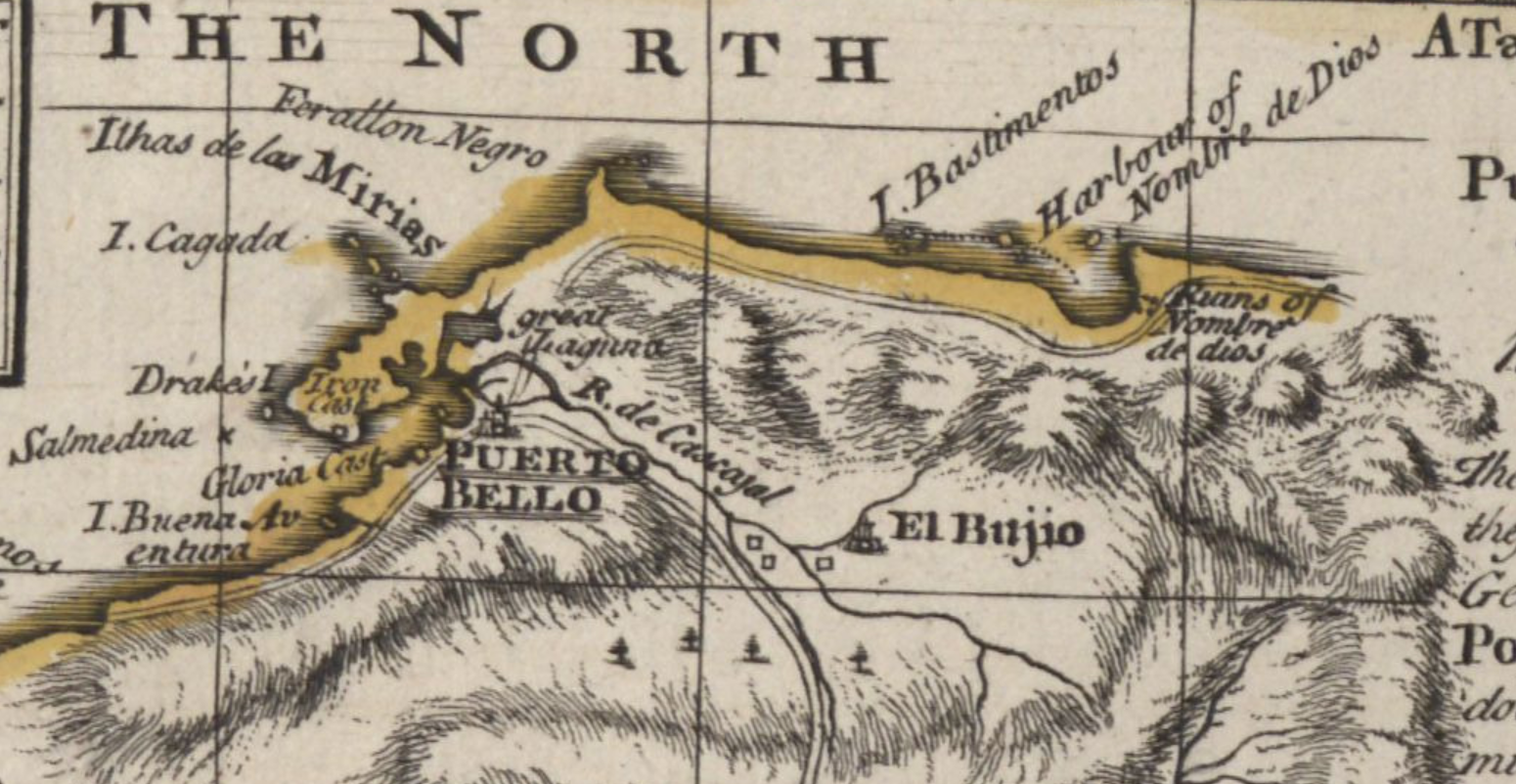
1740 map showing position of Bastimentos Island between Porto Bello and the former harbour of Nombre de Dios

"He (Hosier) accordingly arrived at the Bastimentos near Porto Bello, but being employed rather to overawe than to attack the Spaniards, with whom it was probably not our interest to go to war, he continued long inactive on that station, to his own great regret. He afterwards removed to Carthagena, and remained cruising in these seas, till far the greater part of his men perished deplorably by the diseases of that unhealthy climate. This brave man, seeing his best officers and men thus daily swept away, his ships exposed to inevitable destruction, and himself made the sport of the enemy, is said to have died of a broken heart. Such is the account of Smollett, compared with that of other less party writers".

Hosier was replaced by two further admirals, who likewise successively perished of tropical diseases. Hosier's body was given a temporary burial-place in the ballast of his flagship, the Breda, where it remained, until it was despatched to England, late in the year, on board the snow the Happy Return, under Commander Henry Fowkes. Presumably the body had first been embalmed. He was buried in the family vault, with much funerary pomp, at St Nicholas, Deptford on 28 February 1728.

In 1739, twelve years after Hosier's death, at the start of the War of Jenkins' Ear, Admiral Vernon accomplished what Hosier had been denied from doing, and captured Porto Bello with only six ships, yet like Hosier, Vernon would lose a war to Spain in the Caribbean.

== "Admiral Hosier's Ghost" ==
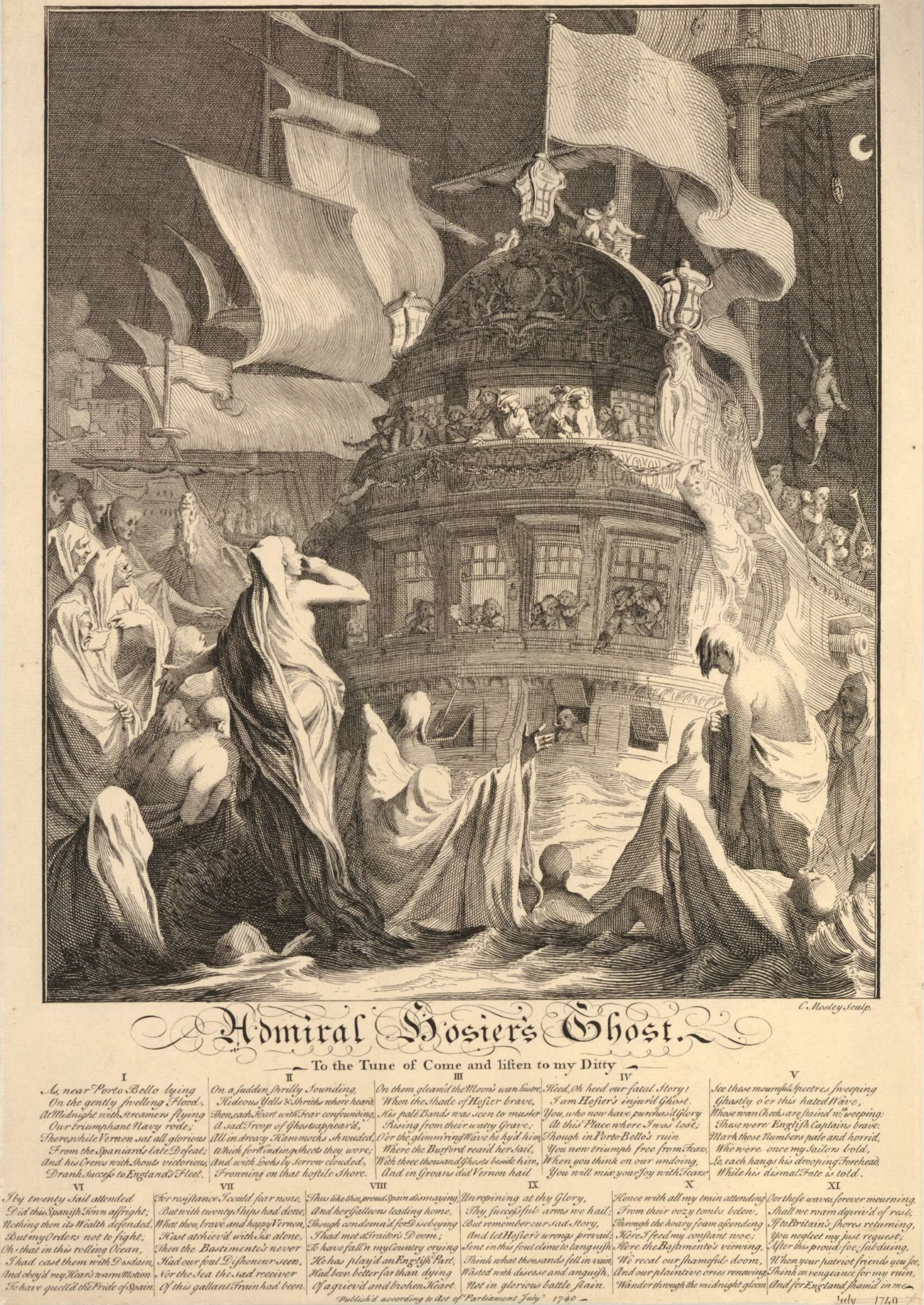
1740 engraving by Charles Mosley of text of poem by Richard Glover "Admiral Hosier's Ghost", with depiction above showing the ghost of Admiral Hosier appearing to Admiral Edward Vernon as he rests at anchor after his victory

Vernon's success prompted the poet Richard Glover in 1740 to write the ballad "Admiral Hosier's Ghost", sung to the tune of "Come and Listen to my Ditty". It is an apology for the failure of Hosier's earlier mission, and seeks to absolve Hosier of having shown a lack of initiative, blaming rather Admiralty orders "not to fight", which were obeyed only "against his heart's warm motion", having been "sent in this foul clime to languish". The ghosts of Hosier and 3,000 of his sailors appear from the sea to Vernon shortly after his victory and Hosier charges him to "let Hosier's wrongs prevail" by drawing notice to the forgotten affair in Opposition circles in England. Only then will the ghosts find their rest. It is thus an attack on Walpole's half-hearted commitment to the war. (Note: The ballad consists of 11 verses which are here quoted for illumination: As near Porto-Bello lying On the gently swelling flood, At midnight with streamers flying Our triumphant navy rode; There while Vernon sate all-glorious From the Spaniards' late defeat; And his crews, with shouts victorious, Drank success to England's fleet,)

== Descendants ==
Francis Hosier married Diana Pritchard at St Bride's, Fleet Street, 4 July 1710, as recorded in the IGI. In 1743, a William Hosier made a benefaction of £300 in South Sea annuities to the Deptford St Nicholas Charity School established in 1723, to educate four children. It has been supposed that this William Hosier was a descendant of the Admiral, but there is no known evidence to support this assumption. Hosier Street, St. Paul Deptford, Greenwich, now lost to World War II bombing, is said to have been named after William Hosier.

== Sources ==
- Cundall, Frank (1915). Historic Jamaica. West India Committee.

Military offices
Preceded by Vacant (Last held by Edward Vernon)	Commander-in-Chief, Jamaica Station; 1726–1727	Succeeded by Edward St Lo
