= Emanuel Lousada =

British merchant and slave plantation owner (1783–1854)

Emanuel Lousada (26 December 1783—14 December 1854) was a British merchant, planter and politician with interests in Jamaica and Barbados. He was the High Sheriff of Devon for 1842–1843 and was associated with Peak House, Sidmouth. He owned more than 400 African slaves on his sugarcane plantations in the British West Indies at the time of the Slavery Abolition Act 1833. He died a wealthy man, leaving £100,000 in his will (worth £10.3 million in 2025).

== Biography ==
Emanuel Lousada was born to a Sephardic Jewish family in London in 1783 to Isaac Baruh Lousada and Judith Lopes Pereira d'Aguilar, the daughter of philanthropist Diego Lopes Pereira. His parents were married at the Bevis Marks Synagogue on 6 March 1771. Emanuel Lousada's ancestors had been involved in the Atlantic slave trade for several generations, owning sugar cane plantations in Jamaica and Barbados worked by enslaved Africans. He ultimately descends from "Antonio" Moses Baruch (1629—1699) who was born in Portugal, the name "Baruch" is sometimes Anglicised in their case as "Barrow". His grandmother Abigail Lamego (1723—1790) was the great-niece of Manuel Rodrigues Lamego who held the official contract (known as the asiento) for the monopoly on providing the Spanish Empire (in particular the Spanish Americas) with African slaves from Portuguese West Africa from 1 April 1623 to 25 September 1631. Lousada should not be confused with his uncle Emanuel Baruch Lousada (1744—1833).

According to the Legacies of British Slave-Ownership at the University College London, Lousada was awarded a payment as a slave trader in the aftermath of the Slavery Abolition Act 1833 with the Slave Compensation Act 1837. The British Government took out a £15 million loan (worth £1.54 billion in 2025) with interest from Nathan Mayer Rothschild and Moses Montefiore which was subsequently paid off by the British taxpayers (ending in 2015). Lousada was associated with five different claims in total; the largest slave plantations he owned were the Jamaican plantations of Carlisle in Vere and Banks in St Anne, as well as the Barbadian plantation of Exchange. Lousada owned 424 slaves in Jamaica and Barbados and received a £6,852 payment at the time (worth £705,167 in 2025). Lousada's family had accrued their wealth through ownership of sugar plantations in the Caribbean over several generations and when Lousada died he left £100,000 in his will (worth £10.3 million in 2025).

Lousada was the High Sheriff of Devon from 1842 until 1843, making him the first Jew to hold the title in a county outside of the Sheriff of London, which had been held by David Salomons in 1835. He was responsible for the development of Peak House, Sidmouth, Devon.

== Personal life ==
Lousada was married to Jane Goldsmid (1783–1870), the daughter of Abraham Goldsmid (1756–1810) from the noted Ashkenazi Dutch-Jewish banking family. Some of Lousada's relatives in Jamaica had been awarded titles of nobility; in 1759, Charles III of Spain created a member of the family Duke de Losada y Lousada and another was created Marquis di San Miniato by the Grand Duke of Tuscany.

== See also ==
- History of the Jews in Jamaica
- History of the Jews in Barbados
