= First wave of European colonization =

Era of colonization in the 15th–19th centuries

The first wave of European colonization began with Spanish and Portuguese conquests and explorations, and primarily involved the European colonization of the Americas, though it also included the establishment of European colonies in India and in Maritime Southeast Asia. During this period, European interests in Africa primarily focused on the establishment of trading posts there, particularly for the African slave trade. The wave ended with the British annexation of the Kingdom of Kandy in 1815 and the founding of the colony of Singapore in 1819.

The beginning of the first wave of European colonization (and other exploratory ventures) is often synonymous with the European period called the Age of Discovery and altogether with the early modern period. At the end of the first wave a new wave of European colonization took shape and is known as the period of New Imperialism, which started in the late 19th-century and primarily focused on Africa and Asia, which is congruent with the period of classical modernity. Both periods are considered as the establishing periods of globalization and modernity.

== The Role of the Church ==
Religious zeal played a large role in Spanish and Portuguese overseas activities. While the Pope himself was a political power to be heeded (as evidenced by his authority to decree whole continents open to colonization by particular kings), the Church also sent missionaries to convert the indigenous peoples of other continents to the Catholic faith. Thus, the 1455 Papal Bull Romanus Pontifex granted the Portuguese all lands behind Cape Bojador and allowed them to reduce pagans and other "enemies of Christ" to perpetual slavery.

Later, the 1481 Papal Bull Aeterni regis granted all lands south of the Canary Islands to Portugal, while in May 1493 the Spanish-born Pope Alexander VI decreed in the Bull Inter caetera that all lands west of a meridian only 100 leagues west of the Cape Verde Islands should belong to Spain while new lands discovered east of that line would belong to Portugal. These arrangements were later precised with the 1494 Treaty of Tordesillas.

The Dominicans and Jesuits, notably Francis Xavier in Asia, were particularly active in this endeavour. Many buildings erected by the Jesuits still stand, such as the Cathedral of Saint Paul in Macau and the Santisima Trinidad de Paraná in Paraguay, an example of a Jesuit Reduction.

Spanish treatment of the indigenous populations provoked a fierce debate at home in 1550–51, dubbed the Valladolid debate, over whether Indians possessed souls and if so, whether they were entitled to the basic rights of mankind. Bartolomé de Las Casas, author of A Short Account of the Destruction of the Indies, championed the cause of the natives, and was opposed by Sepúlveda, who claimed Amerindians were "natural slaves".

The School of Salamanca, which gathered theologians such as Francisco de Vitoria (c. 1483–1546) or Francisco Suárez (1548–1617), argued in favor of the existence of natural law, which thus gave some rights to indigenous people. However, while the School of Salamanca limited Charles V's imperial powers over colonized people, they also legitimized the conquest, defining the conditions of "Just War". For example, these theologians admitted the existence of the right for indigenous people to reject religious conversion, which was a novelty for Western philosophical thought. However, Suárez also conceived many particular cases — a casuistry — in which conquest was legitimized. Hence, war was justified if the indigenous people refused free transit and commerce to the Europeans; if they forced converts to return to idolatry; if there come to be a sufficient number of Christians in the newly discovered land that they wish to receive from the Pope a Christian government; if the indigenous people lacked just laws, magistrates, agricultural techniques, etc. In any case, title taken according to this principle must be exercised with Christian charity, warned Suárez, and for the advantage of the Indians. Henceforth, the School of Salamanca legitimized the conquest while at the same time limiting the absolute power of the sovereign, which was celebrated in others parts of Europe under the notion of the divine right of kings.

In the 1970s, the Jesuits would become a main proponent of the Liberation theology which openly supported anti-imperialist movements. Aspects of it were officially criticised in 1984 and in 1986 by then Cardinal Ratzinger (later Pope Benedict XVI) as the head of the Congregation for the Doctrine of the Faith, under charges of Marxist tendencies, who nevertheless praised its commitment to social justice, poverty and what he called the 'scandal of the arms race'. Pope John Paul II in a speech to Brazilian bishops in 1986 would subsequently say that a theology of liberation was necessary.

== Northern European challenges to Iberian hegemony ==
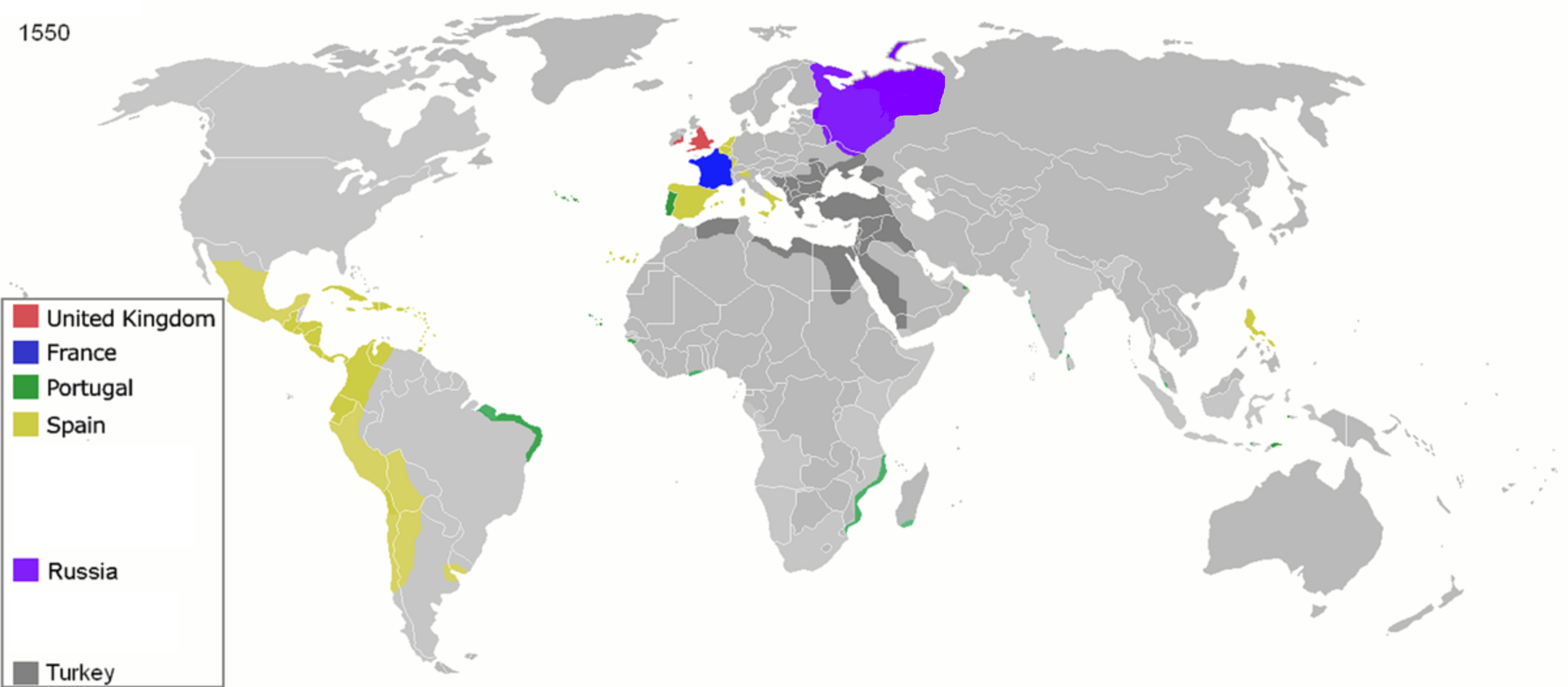
Map of the world in 1550, after the establishment of the first Spanish and Portuguese colonies

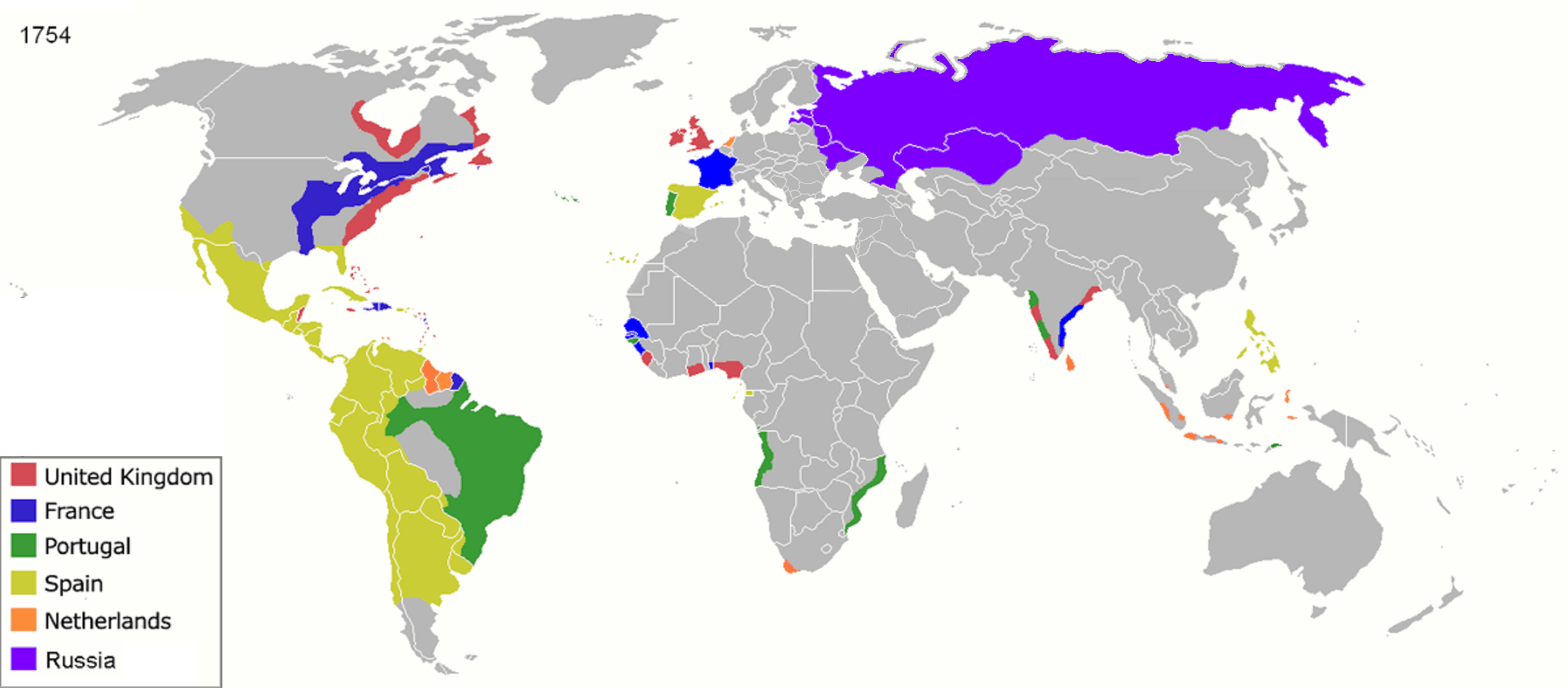
Map of the world in 1754, prior to the Seven Years' War

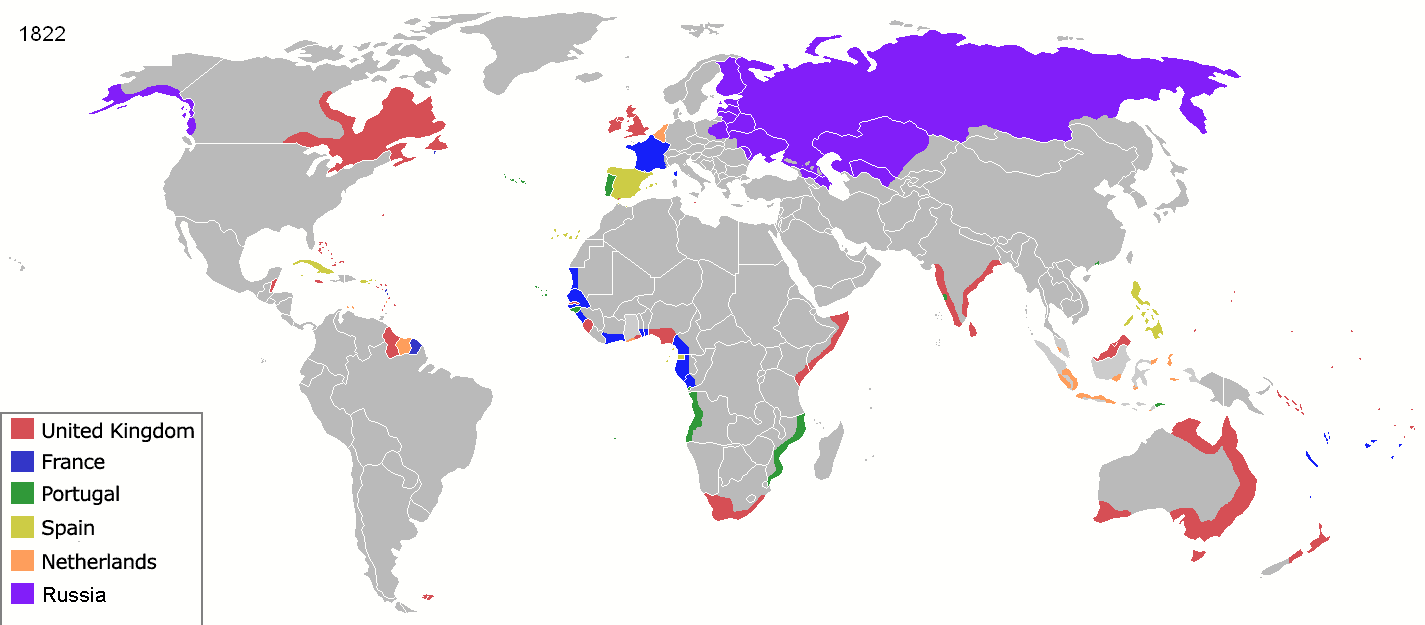
Map of the world in 1822, after the Napoleonic Wars

It was not long before the exclusivity of Iberian claims to the Americas was challenged by other European powers, primarily the Netherlands, France and England: the view taken by the rulers of these nations is epitomized by the quotation attributed to Francis I of France demanding to be shown the clause in Adam's will excluding his authority from the New World.

This challenge initially took the form of privateering raids (such as that led by Francis Drake) on Spanish treasure fleets or coastal settlements, but later, Northern European countries began establishing settlements of their own, primarily in areas that were outside of Spanish interests, such as what is now the eastern seaboard of the United States and Canada, or islands in the Caribbean, such as Aruba, Martinique and Barbados, that had been abandoned by the Spanish in favour of the mainland and larger islands.

Whereas Spanish colonialism was based on the religious conversion and exploitation of local populations via encomiendas (many Spaniards emigrated to the Americas to elevate their social status, and were not interested in manual labour), Northern European colonialism was frequently bolstered by people fleeing religious persecution or intolerance (for example, the Mayflower voyage). The motive for emigration was not to become an aristocrat nor to spread one's faith but to start afresh in a new society, where life would be hard but one would be free to exercise one's religious beliefs. The most populous emigration of the 17th century was that of the English, and after a series of wars with the Dutch and the French the English overseas possessions came to dominate the east coast of North America, an area stretching from Virginia northwards to New England and Newfoundland, although during the 17th century an even greater number of English emigrants settled in the West Indies.

However, the English, French and Dutch were no more averse to making a profit than the Spanish and Portuguese, and whilst their areas of settlement in the Americas proved to be devoid of the precious metals found by the Spanish, trade in other commodities and products that could be sold at massive profit in Europe provided another reason for crossing the Atlantic, in particular furs from Canada, tobacco and cotton grown in Virginia and sugar in the islands of the Caribbean and Brazil. Due to the massive depletion of indigenous labour, plantation owners had to look elsewhere for manpower for these labour-intensive crops. They turned to the centuries-old slave trade of west Africa and began transporting humans across the Atlantic on a massive scale – historians estimate that the Atlantic slave trade brought between 10 and 12 million individuals to the New World. The islands of the Caribbean soon came to be populated by slaves of African descent, ruled over by a white minority of plantation owners interested in making a fortune and then returning to their home country to spend it.

== Rule in the colonies: the Leyes de Burgos and the Code Noir ==
January 27, 1512 Leyes de Burgos codified the government of the indigenous people of the New World, since the common law of Spain wasn't applied in these recently discovered territories. The scope of the laws were originally restricted to the island of Hispaniola, but were later extended to Puerto Rico and Jamaica. They authorized and legalized the colonial practice of creating encomiendas, where Indians were grouped together to work under colonial masters, limiting the size of these establishments to a minimum of 40 and a maximum of 150 people. The document finally prohibited the use of any form of punishment by the encomenderos, reserving it for officials established in each town for the implementation of the laws. It also ordered that the Indians undergo catechism, outlawed bigamy, and required that the huts and cabins of the Indians be built together with those of the Spanish. It respected, in some ways, the traditional authorities, granting chiefs exemptions from ordinary jobs and granting them various Indians as servants. The poor fulfilment of the laws in many cases lead to innumerable protests and claims. This would create momentum for reform, carried out through the Leyes Nuevas ("New Laws") in 1542. Ten years later, Dominican friar Bartolomé de las Casas would publish A Short Account of the Destruction of the Indies, in the midst of the Valladolid Controversy.

In the French empire, slave trade and other colonial rules were regulated by Louis XIV's 1689 Code Noir.

== Role of companies in early colonialism ==
From its very outset, Western colonialism was operated as a joint public-private venture. Columbus' voyages to the Americas were partially funded by Italian investors, but whereas the Spanish state maintained a tight rein on trade with its colonies (by law, the colonies could only trade with one designated port in the mother country and treasure was brought back in special convoys), the English, French and Dutch granted what were effectively trade monopolies to joint-stock companies such as the East India Companies and the Hudson's Bay Company. The Massachusetts Bay Company, founded in 1628/9, swiftly established a form of self-governance following the Cambridge Agreement of August 1629, whereby subsequent meetings of the board of governors took place in Massachusetts itself.

== European colonies in India during the first wave of colonization ==
In 1498, the Portuguese arrived in Goa. Rivalry among reigning European powers saw the entry of the Dutch, British, French, Danish among others. The fractured debilitated kingdoms of India were gradually taken over by the Europeans and indirectly controlled by puppet rulers. In 1600, Queen Elizabeth I accorded a charter, forming the East India Company to trade with India and eastern Asia. The British landed in India in Surat in 1624. By the 19th century, they had assumed direct and indirect control over most of India.

== Destruction of the Indigenous population in the Americas ==
The arrival of the conquistadores and other Europeans lead to the population decline of the vast majority of the Indigenous peoples of the Americas. However, contemporary historians now generally reject the black legend according to which the brutality of the European colonists accounted for most of the deaths. It is now generally believed that diseases, such as the smallpox, brought upon by the Columbian exchange, were the greatest destroyer, although the brutality of the conquest itself isn't contested. After the decline of the Indigenous population in the Caribbean, the mines and the sugarcane plantations were then worked on by slaves transported to the Americas during the Atlantic slave trade from Africa.

There were acts of genocide in 19th century post-colonial states, notably in United States with the California genocide and in Argentina where caudillo Juan Manuel de Rosas from 1829 to 1852, openly pursued the extermination of the local population, an event related by Darwin in The Voyage of the Beagle (1839). Rosas was then followed by the "Conquest of the Desert" in the 1870–80s. The result was the death of a large proportion of the Mapuche population in Patagonia.

Contemporary historians debate the legitimacy of calling the destruction of the Indigenous peoples a "genocide". Estimates of the pre-Columbian population have ranged from a low of 8.4 million to a high of 112.5 million persons; in 1976, geographer William Denevan derived a "consensus count" of about 54 million people.

David Stannard has argued that "The destruction of the Indigenous peoples of the Americas was, far and away, the most massive act of genocide in the history of the world", with almost 100 million Indigenous people killed in what he calls the American Holocaust. Ward Churchill also believes that the Indigenous peoples were deliberately and systematically exterminated over the course of several centuries, and that the process continues to the present day.

Stannard's claim of 100 million deaths has been disputed because he makes no distinction between death from violence and death from disease. In response, political scientist R. J. Rummel has instead estimated that over the centuries of European colonization about 2 million to 15 million American indigenous people were the victims of what he calls democide. "Even if these figures are remotely true", writes Rummel, "then this still make this subjugation of the Americas one of the bloodier, centuries long, democides in world history."

== Economic pursuit and treatment of slaves ==
Spain and Portugal sought the utilization of foreign and indigenous peoples during post colonial contact with the New World. The Portuguese and Spanish use of slavery in Latin America was seen as a lucrative business which ultimately led to internal and external development in gaining economic influence at any cost. The economic pursuits of the Spanish and Portuguese empires ushered in the era of the Atlantic Slave Trade.

In the fifteenth century, Portugal shifted its attention to the latter economic endeavor. Their ships sailed from the borders of the Sahara desert to the entirety of the West African coast. At the outset of the Atlantic Slave Trade, Manuel Bautista Pérez, a notable Portuguese-born Marrano Jewish slave trader, gives insight to the amount and treatment of the African slaves. Pérez and his men conducted slave trading in which thousands of African peoples were bought from local tribal leaders and transported across the Atlantic to South America. In contrast from popular belief, Portuguese slave traders did not acquire slaves in a forceful manner. According to documents written by Manuel Pérez, slaves were only made available by certain conditions. The most notable condition was bartering “items that the leaders wanted and were interested in”. Items such as bread, coal, precious stones, and firearms were provided in exchange for slaves. Furthermore, local tribal leaders did not simply give up their own people for the aforementioned commodities but rather through intertribal wars, debts, and civil crime offenders.

Labor in the Spanish and Portuguese colonies became scarce. European diseases and forced labor began killing the indigenous people in insurmountable numbers. Therefore, slaves were seen only as a business venture due to the labor shortages. These slaves were forced to work in jobs such as agriculture and mining. According to David Eltis, areas controlled by the Spanish such as Mexico, Peru, and large parts of Central America used forced slave labor in "mining activities". In 1494 the Pope ushered in the Treaty of Tordesillas, granting Spain and Portugal two separate parts of the world. Due to this treaty, Portugal had the monopoly on acquiring the slaves from Africa. However, Spain, like Portugal, needed the labor force to pursue their personal economic gains. This gave Portugal an increased revenue stream. African slaves were sold to the Spanish colonies through an internal reform known as the asiento; which gave the right, by the Spanish Crown, for acquiring African slaves from the Portuguese traders.

In terms of the treatment of slaves, Portuguese external policies on the acquisition of slaves depict a malicious attempt to obtaining economic wealth. Nearly 3,600 slaves a year were traded by a single trader. This latter statement illuminates that traders tried to get as many slaves as they could in the shortest amount of time. Consequently, this led to the deaths of thousands of African peoples. Newly bought slaves were kept tightly packed in highly flammable huts in order to wait for transport. Once aboard the ships many hundreds of people would once again be shoved into lower ship compartments, collectively chained up, and given little to eat. By these actions "nearly a quarter of the slaves transported died before ever reaching the destination". Many of them suffocated in the lower compartments as the hatches upon the deck remained closed; restricting the circulation of air. Slaves were often branded with a mark upon their skin to identify either the ship they arrived on or the company that purchased them. In addition, the slaves were seen as a "potentially economic utility"; therefore they were often equated to cattle when moved about. Many African people died in large numbers in order to meet the demand for Spanish and Portuguese labor requirements.

Both Spain and Portugal share a similar history in regards to the treatment of slaves in their colonies. As time progressed and new generations of slaves lived under imperial rule, Spanish and Portuguese internal reforms dealt with African slaves in areas such as, "the purchasing and selling of slaves, legal ownership, succession upon death of owner, the rights of slaves to buy their liberty, and penalties to those who ran away". There was a constant strict social control amongst the slave population. Nevertheless, the goal was to create and sustain a labor force that would yield maximum economic output. The lucrative business the Portuguese sought on the West African coast ushered in an era in which human labor, at any cost, was used for the extraction of wealth.

== See also ==
- Timeline of European imperialism
