= Manuel Bautista Pérez =

Spanish-born merchant (1589–1639)

Manuel Bautista Perez (2 July 1589 – 23 January 1639) was a Spanish-born merchant and multi-millionaire active in Africa, Europe, the Americas and Asia. Though Spanish, Manuel called himself Portuguese because Spanish New Christians were not allowed in the New World. Perez became extremely wealthy, according to the Jewish Encyclopedia, Perez amassed a fortune which would have been the equivalent of $1,000,000 in 1906. Perez moved to Lima with his wife and three children. He was sent with a large sum to invest for his brothers-in-law back in Spain. He was born to a Marrano family, that is to say a Sephardic Jew whose family outwardly conformed to Catholicism for socio-political reasons, but privately practiced Judaism.

Already persecuted by the Spanish inquisitors especially in 1620 and in 1635, Perez and a number of other Jews in Peru fell foul of the Peruvian Inquisition in Lima as part of the so-called "Great Jewish Conspiracy" trials of the 1630s, where he and other merchants were accused of Judaizing and supposedly plotting to hand over the Viceroyalty of Peru to the Dutch Empire. He was among twelve Jewish accused of slave trading and others, handed out the strongest punishment possible for their alleged involvement and was burned alive at the stake as part of an auto-da-fé in 1639.

== Biography ==
=== Background ===
Perez was born on 2 July 1589 at Ançã, Coimbra, Kingdom of Portugal. His parents were Sephardic Jews who had become "New Christians"; outwardly conforming to the Catholic Church to avoid being expelled from the Iberian Peninsula. He was sent to live with his maternal aunt Blanca Gomez in Lisbon in the early 1590s. When he was around 10 years old, Perez and his aunt moved to Seville, Kingdom of Seville. An Iberian Union had occurred in 1580 under Spain's House of Habsburg after the decline of Portugal's House of Aviz; this made the movement of Portuguese (including the Marranos who had fled from Spain a century or so earlier) more common. Here, he fell under the influence of his uncle, Diego Rodriguez de Lisboa, who was involved in the Atlantic slave trade: transporting Black African slaves across the Atlantic Ocean to the Americas. Perez married his second-cousin Guiomar Enriquez in 1626 and had six children with her in Lima.

=== Slave trade and multi-millionaire fortune ===
Perez and his brother, Juan Bautista Perez, began involving themselves directly in the slave trade by travelling to Cacheu, Portuguese Guinea. The Portuguese-born involved in the Atlantic slave trade conducted their business as individual private traders, rather than as part of state-owned joint-stock companies. From around 1614, the Perez brothers were involved in bringing these African slaves to Cartagena de Indias, Viceroyalty of New Granada. From 1595 until 1640, the Portuguese-born held the Asiento de Negros, a kind of monopoly contract to export African slaves to the colonies in Spanish Empire. The Portuguese had long established their influence in West Africa through trade and so the Spanish found it useful to simply lease out the rights to them instead of directly getting involved themselves. Significant figures such as asiento holders such as António Fernandes de Elvas and Manuel Rodrigues Lamego were also of Cristão-Novo converso or Marrano Jewish ancestry, like the Perez brothers and were able to enrich themselves greatly by their involvement in the trade of enslaved African people. Between 1613 and 1619, Pérez personally undertook two slave-trading ventures to Upper Guinea (what is today Senegal, The Gambia and Guinea-Bissau).

Perez' brother died prematurely in Guinea in 1617, so he and his wife decided to relocate permanently to Peru. He maintained his business contacts in Upper Guinea, Cartagena de Indias and Panama. Personal records pertaining to Perez held in the Archivo General de la Nación in Lima gives the most detailed existing record of the process of the Atlantic slave trade in the 1610s. According to Linda Newson of King's College London, Perez became "one of the most prominent slave traders in Lima, Peru, in the 1620s and 1630s, when he was responsible for the importation of about 300 to 400 African slaves a year".

Here he established himself as the richest man in Peru of the day. According to the Jewish Encyclopedia, from his activities in the Atlantic slave trade, Perez amassed a fortune which would have been the equivalent of $1,000,000 in 1906 (worth $35.8 million in 2025). Perez even owned the Royal Plaza Mayor, Lima. Aside from his uncle and his brother, Perez formed the lynch-pin and was referred to as the "Gran Capitan" of an international "New Christian" slave trading network from the Iberian Peninsula to Africa to the Americas; his key trading partners were Felipe Rodriguez, Sebastian Duarte (married to his wife's sister, Isabel Enriquez), Antonio Rodriguez de Acosta, Duarte Rodriguez de León, Pedro Duarte, Pablo Rodriguez, Juan Rodriguez Duarte, Luis de Vega, Manuel de Acosta, Simon and Garcia Vaez Enriquez (brothers of his wife) among others.

=== Trial and death under the Inquisition ===
Perez, "one of the world's most powerful men in international commerce" and nearly one hundred fellow "New Christians" were arrested by the Peruvian Inquisition in Lima on 11 August 1635, accused of being a party to what is called the complicidad grande, or "Great Jewish Conspiracy" to commit heresy and treason. The specific charge levied by Inquisitor of Lima, Antonio de Castro y Castillo, was that the group were Judaizers, who pretended to society that they were faithful Catholics, but secretly, in private continued to practice their ancestral religion of Rabbinic Judaism. In addition to this, they were accused of orchestrating a plan to turn the Viceroyalty of Peru over to the Dutch Republic (the Calvinist enemies of Spain). The main figureheads investigated most in depth as part of this by the Inquisition were Perez, Doña Mencia de Luna and Manuel Henríquez. Something similar had happened a mere five years earlier during the Dutch–Portuguese War, where at Recife in 1630, after the Dutch forces had captured Portuguese Brazil, the mercantile community of "New Christian" slave traders at Recife, openly began practicing Judaism under Dutch Brazil (which was more favourable to Jews than the Catholic powers and had a prominent Jewish community in Amsterdam and throughout the Dutch Empire).

The prosecuting attorney had over twenty witnesses against Perez over the course of the hearings from September 1635 to February 1636, including relatives of his wife. Around fourteen Castilian witnesses defended Perez, including some members of the Society of Jesus, who claimed that, as far as could be shown, Perez was faithful to Catholicism. Despite his protestations of innocence, Manuel Bautista Perez was found guilty at his trial of the charges laid against him and sentenced to death. The crackdown on these Portuguese-born accused Crypto-Jews by the Inquisition involved 63 Jews who were given various punishments, such as public flogging, humiliation and exile, while Perez was one of twelve sentenced to death by being burned alive at the stake in the largest auto-da-fé in history. One of the Jews convicted committed suicide during the trial so was burned in effigy. Francisco Maldonado de Silva, a noted physician, was one of the other Jews who were burned at the same time as Perez (he had been in prison since 1628 and converted prisoners to Judaism).

== See also ==
- History of the Jews in Peru
- Judaism and slavery
- Luis de Carvajal y de la Cueva
- Francisca Nuñez de Carabajal
- Dutch Revolt
