= Peruvian Inquisition =

Extension of the Spanish Inquisition in Peru

Peruvian Inquisition Inquisición peruana
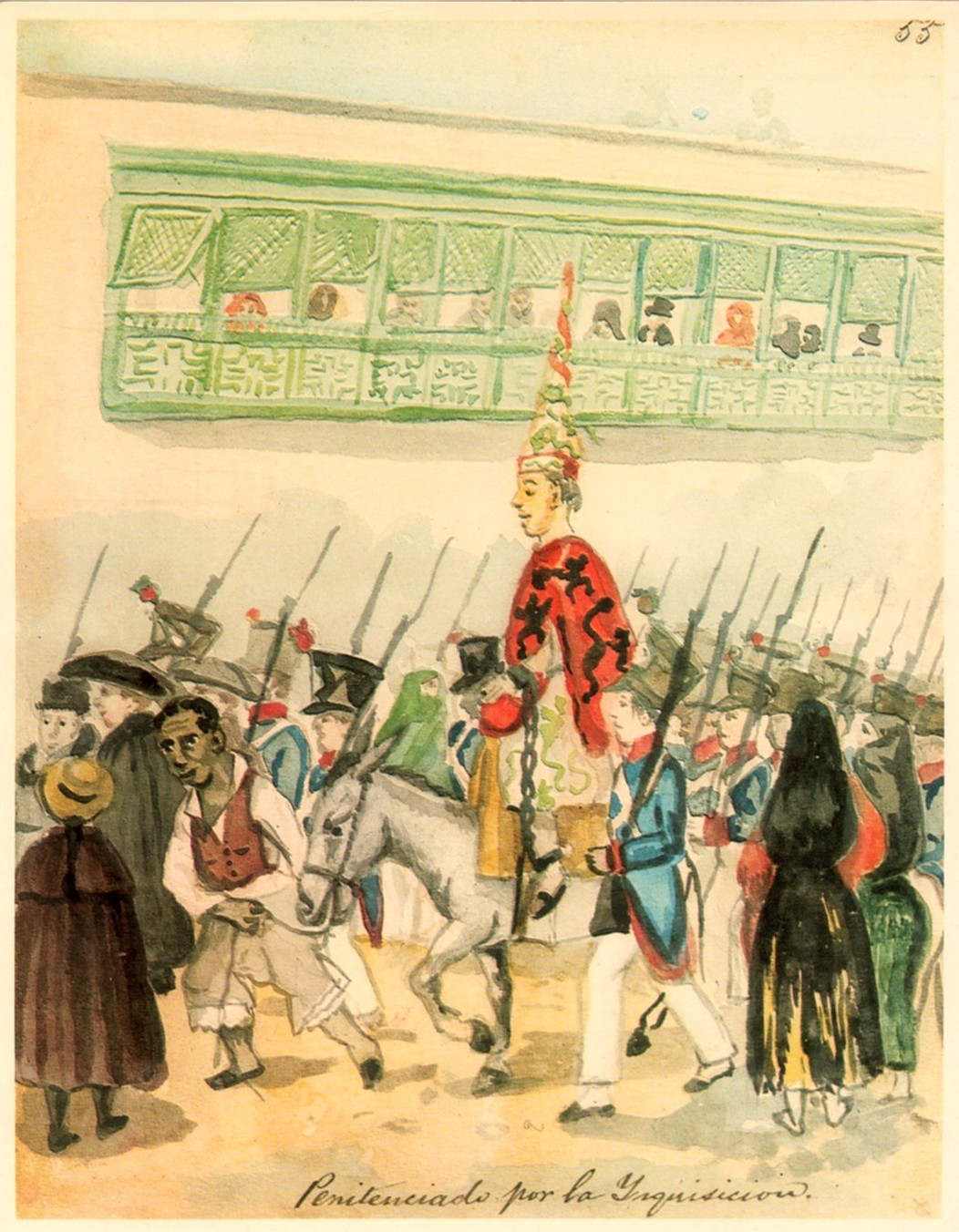
- A watercolored painting by Francisco Fierro illustrating an individual held by the Inquisition and being paraded through the streets of Lima.

History
- Established: 1570
- Disbanded: 1820

Meeting place
- Lima, Viceroyalty of Peru

Footnotes
- See also: Spanish Inquisition; Mexican Inquisition

The Peruvian Inquisition was established on January 9, 1570 and ended in 1820. The Holy Office and tribunal of the Inquisition were located in Lima, the administrative center of the Viceroyalty of Peru.

== History ==
In 1570, King Philip II instructed the Holy Office of the Inquisition to establish tribunals in the Spanish colonies. One was located in the city of Mexico, covering the Viceroyalty of New Spain. The other was located in the city of Lima, covering the Viceroyalty of Peru.

Unlike the Spanish Inquisition and the Medieval Inquisition, in the Peruvian Inquisition both the authorities and the church were dependent of the Crown's approval to carry out jurisdiction.

Office documents show that various tests were created to identify Jews, Lutherans and Muslims, with members of those groups punished, tortured or killed for their beliefs.

In 1813 it was first abolished by virtue of a Cortes decree. In 1815 it was reconstituted but their target was now the ideas from the French Encyclopédistes and similar texts, and most people who were accused of crimes were only given probation. With the promotion of Freemason José de la Serna to the viceroyship, which coincided with the rise of the nationalist faction (as both factions prepared to fight each other in the Peruvian War of Independence), the Inquisition fell apart of its own volition.

== Statistics ==
A review of the figures given by Escandell indicates that in its beginnings the Court was dedicated to supervising the European population. It includes both the so-called "old Christians" and some descendants of converts, mainly those of Jewish descent, who, evading express royal prohibitions, arrived in the Hispano-American provinces. It must be reiterated that the great majority of the Peruvian population was made up of indigenous people, who, as neophytes in Christianity, remained outside the sphere of jurisdiction of the Court, in accordance with the provisions of the kings of Spain. Also striking is the high percentage of foreign defendants, which exceeds their corresponding demographic participation. This has been calculated for the period 1532-1560 between 8% and 12%. This is explained by reasons of State that made it essential to control possible spies of the enemy powers of Spain.

ETHNIC GROUPS	PROCESS	PERCENTAGE
Spaniards	391	78.57%
Foreigners	86	17.30%
Mestizo, black and mulatto people	21	4.13%
Total	498	100.00%

Regarding the type of sentences, most of them are abjurations that total 173 and are equivalent to 67%. Thus, two thirds of those sentenced abjured their errors, to which were added, mostly, some spiritual penalties and the payment of the costs of the processes or some fines. The reconciled and the acquitted reached 30 and 29 respectively, while the suspended processes were 8. 6 were sentenced to death and 9 effigies were burned. Of those sentenced to burning, 5 were Portuguese Judaizers: Lucena de Baltasar, Duarte Núñez de Cea -both left in the car of 1600- Duarte Enríquez, Diego López de Vargas and Gregorio Díaz Tavares left in the car of 1605. The bachelor Juan Bautista del Castillo was the only person from Lima sentenced to death at the stake -in the entire history of this Court- for propositions contrary to faith, which he spread throughout the city in the midst of public scandal.

=== Sentenced to death by the Court of Lima (1569-1820) ===
CAUSE	NUMBERS	PERCENTAGE
Judaizers	23	71.88%
Protestants	6	18.75%
"Proposiciciones"	2	6.25%
"Alumbrados"	1	3.12%
Total	32	100.00

== See also ==
- Mexican Inquisition
- Museum of Congress and the Inquisition
- Manuel Bautista Pérez
