= Manuel Rodrigues Lamego =

Portuguese merchant

Manuel Rodrigues de Lamego (born circa 1590) was a Portuguese-born merchant and slave trader active in Europe, Africa, Asia and the Americas. Rodrigues de Lamego was a Marrano. He was contracted by the Spanish Empire with an official asiento to provide their colonies in the Spanish Americas with African slaves from 1 April 1623 to 25 September 1631. During this time, he was the Contratodore (monopolist trader) for the Atlantic slave trade in Angola's Portuguese West African territory. Contrary to his predecessor as asiento holder, António Fernandes de Elvas, he was not the Contratodore for Cape Verde and Guinea. After his tenure, he was succeeded as asiento holder by Melchor Gómez Angel and Cristóvão Mendes de Sousa, while he was succeeded as Contratodore for Angola by Henrique Gomes da Costa.

== Biography ==
Manuel Rodrigues de Lamego was born at Lamego, the Kingdom of Portugal to a Sephardic Jewish converso family. His father was Luis António Rodrigues de Lamego, and he had several siblings of note. João Rodrigues de Lamego, one brother, was married to a sister of Juan Nunez Saravia (1585—1639), a fellow Marrano and the official banker to Philip IV of Spain in Madrid. In addition to this, another brother, António Rodrigues de Lamego (died 1653), worked as an agent for Nunez Saravia in Rouen. Antonio Rodrigues de Lamego was married to Sarah Curiel (1592—1679), daughter of Abraham Curiel, from the notable Sephardi Curiel family (also known as Nuñez da Costa). Manuel Rodrigues de Lamego himself was engaged in trade with Portuguese India through the Brandão and Silveira family consortiums.

Following the War of the Portuguese Succession, the Iberian Union (1580–1640) was formed whereby the Habsburg Spanish Empire took control of Portugal. The Portuguese had established important trade routes in West Africa as part of the Portuguese Empire since the 15th century and their merchants, whereby African slaves purchased from West African traders were brought to work sugar cane and other plantations in Portuguese America. This period, known as the "first Atlantic system", lasted from 1502 until 1580. After the Union, the Spanish wanted to expand slavery in their American domains and so awarded an asiento, an official monopoly licence, to certain experienced traders who had knowledge of West Africa; the two main groups competing for the asiento were the Portuguese Sephardic conversos and the Genoese. Marrano slave trading families other than Rodrigues de Lamego that formed part of this international network were: Fernandes de Elvas, Jiménez, Noronha, Mendes, Pallos Dias, Caballero, Jorge and Caldeira.

It is this position that was awarded to Manuel Rodrigues de Lamego from 1623 until 1631. To attain this he beat off competition from Elena Rodrigues Solís, the widow of former holder António Fernandes de Elvas. Rodrigues de Lamego had gained a foothold in the Atlantic slave trade as contratodore for the trade in the Portuguese West African territory of Angola. His network included converso friends and relations who were bankers in Brazil and other parts of Europe, including the United Provinces of the Netherlands. The sitting king of Spain, Philip IV, was favourable to the converso merchants, granting all Portuguese-born the right to trade anywhere in the Spanish Empire since 1627. Similarly sympathetic was his Prime Minister, the Count-Duke of Olivares (who had a measure of converso ancestry himself through Lope Conchillos). During the tenure of Manuel Rodrigues de Lamego, ships were allowed to register at Lisbon and not just Seville. This earned him the ire of the less well off Old Christian families in Seville, who struggled to compete and lobbied the Spanish Inquisition in the contest: Manuel's brother António was subject to an auto-da-fé for "Judaising". While Manuel Rodrigues de Lamego held the asiento, fifty-nine ships were licensed for Africa, where around eight-thousand African slaves were purchased from West African merchants, mostly from Luanda. As in previous times, the two main places in the Spanish Americas that slaves from Africa were brought were Cartagena de Indias (in modern Colombia) and Veracruz (in modern Mexico) from here they were distributed out towards what is today Venezuela, the Antilles and Lima (through Portobello and Panama) then by land to Upper Peru and Potosí. This transportation itself is estimated to have caused more deaths than the Atlantic crossing itself.

== Family life ==
It is not known if Rodrigues de Lamego had any offspring, however, his siblings had many and some of them married into prominent families. This includes the Lousadas, a prominent Sephardic Jewish family who were involved in sugar plantations in the Caribbean as slave-owners in Jamaica and Barbados (both in the British West Indies) and then later relocated to London in the 18th century: a prominent example is Emanuel Lousada. Other relatives were involved with prominent figures; Duarte Rodrigues de Lamego of Rouen was substantial creditor to Michael de Spinoza, the father of the excommunicated philosopher Baruch Spinoza. In addition to this, the family provided many spies to the Portuguese government.

== See also ==
- Slavery in the Spanish New World colonies
- Manuel Bautista Pérez
- Antonio Fernandez Carvajal

Preceded by António Fernandes de Elvas	Asiento for Atlantic slave trade in the Spanish Empire; 1623–1631	Succeeded by Melchor Gómez Angel and Cristóvão Mendes de Sousa
Preceded by António Fernandes de Elvas	Contratodore for Angola; 1623–1624	Succeeded by Henrique Gomes da Costa
