= António Fernandes de Elvas =

Portuguese slave trader (died 1623)

António Fernandes de Elvas (died 1623) was a Portuguese-born merchant, including investor in pepper tax farm and Asian spices. Fernandes de Elvas and his family were Marranos; that is to say Sephardic Jews who conformed outwardly as Cristão-Novo due to the demands of the Portuguese Crown but privately continued to adhere to Judaism. He was contracted by the Spanish Empire with an official asiento to provide their colonies in the Spanish Americas with African slaves from 27 September 1615 to 1 April 1623. During this time, he was the Contratodore (monopolist trader) for the Atlantic slave trade in Portuguese West Africa: Angola, Cape Verde and Guinea. He was succeeded in his position as monopolist for providing slaves to the Spanish by a fellow Marrano, Manuel Rodrigues Lamego.

== Biography ==
António Fernandes de Elvas was born in the Kingdom of Portugal to a Sephardic Jewish converso family, who had outwardly conformed to the Catholic Church to avoid being expelled from the country, but continued to practice Judaism in private. Fernandes de Elvas and his family was engaged in the spice trade, particularly black pepper from Portuguese India.

Following the Portuguese Succession War, the Iberian Union (1580–1640) was formed whereby the Habsburg Spanish Empire took control of Portugal (which had previously been an independent kingdom under the House of Aviz). The Portuguese had established essential trade routes in West Africa as part of the Portuguese Empire since the 15th century. Their merchants, including Sephardic Jews, started the Atlantic slave trade, whereby African slaves purchased from West African traders were brought to work sugar cane and other plantations in Portuguese America. This period, known as the "first Atlantic system," lasted from 1502 until 1580. After the Union, the Spanish wanted to expand slavery in their American domains and so awarded an asiento, an official monopoly licence, to experienced traders who had knowledge of West Africa; the two main groups competing for the asiento were the Portuguese Sephardic conversos and the Genoese. Marrano slave-trading families other than Fernandes de Elvas that formed part of this international network were: Rodrigues, Jiménez, Noronha, Mendes, Pallos Dias, Caballero, Jorge and Caldeira.

It is this position that was awarded to António Fernandes de Elvas from 1615 until 1623. The two main places in the Spanish Americas that slaves from Africa were brought under Fernandes de Elvas were Cartagena de Indias (in modern Colombia) and Veracruz (in modern Mexico) from here they were distributed out towards what is today Venezuela, the Antilles and Lima (through Portobello and Panama) then by land to Upper Peru and Potosí. This transportation itself is estimated to have caused more deaths than the Atlantic crossing itself. For its era, Fernandes de Elvas' time as asiento represented the most intense uptick of the slave trade and largest mass movement of African slaves to the Americas since the trade had begun, most of it from Luanda, Portuguese Angola and the Portuguese Congo. Between 1619 and 1624, crossing over into the period that Fernandes de Elvas' successor and fellow Marrano, Manuel Rodrigues de Lamego took over as asiento, 11,328 Africans slaves were purchased and brought to Cartagena. This was only interrupted by the Dutch Capture of Bahia and a temporary blockade of Luanda, which began a sway towards the Dutch West India Company. In the decade or so after Fernandes de Elvas' death, the Spanish Inquisition, which had been in Lima since 1570, Mexico since 1571 and Cartagena since 1610 began a more severe crackdown on the Portuguese converso merchants as a class, disrupting the trade network that Fernandes de Elvas had represented.

== Personal life ==
António Fernandes de Elvas was married to Elena Rodrigues Solís, she, like her husband was of Marrano background. This made Fernandes de Elvas the son-in-law of Jorge Rodrigues de Solís and the brother-in-law of Jerónimo Rodrigues de Solís; indeed Jerónimo worked under his brother-in-law in the slave trade in Cape Verde and Angola. Their son Jorge Fernandes de Elvas was married to the daughter of Duarte Gomes Solís, an economics writer. He also worked in the slave trade under his father as his agent at Cartagena de Indias, but squandered a lot of his family's wealth at parties in Madrid. Even after the death of her husband, Elena continued to work in the slave trade. However, she failed to gain the asiento, working under her brother Francisco Gomes Solís in Cartagena de Indias.

== See also ==
- Slavery in the Spanish New World colonies
- Manuel Bautista Pérez

Preceded by Gonçalo Vaz Coutinho	Asiento for Atlantic slave trade in the Spanish Empire; 1615–1623	Succeeded by Manuel Rodrigues Lamego
Preceded by Duarte Dias Henriques	Contratodore for Angola; 1615–1623	Succeeded by Manuel Rodrigues Lamego
Preceded by Royal Administration (before that João Soeiro)	Contratodore for Cape Verde & Guinea; 1615–1623	Succeeded by Royal Administration (then André da Fonseca)
