= Louis de Gorrevod =

Savoyard cardinal (c. 1473–1535)

His Grace Louis de Gorrevod
- Cardinal-Priest
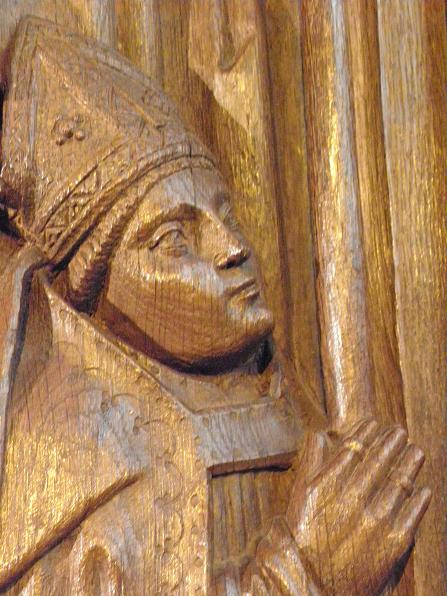
- Statue of Louis de Gorrevod in the Église Notre-Dame (Bourg-en-Bresse)
- Church: San Cesareo in Palatio
- Diocese: Bourg-en-Bresse; Saint-Jean-de-Maurienne

Orders
- Created cardinal: 9 March 1530 by Pope Clement VII

Personal details
- Born: 1473 Bourg-en-Bresse ?
- Died: 1535 (aged 61–62) Saint-Jean-de-Maurienne
- Parents: Jean de Gorrevod; Jeanne de Loriol-Challes

Louis de Gorrevod (c. 1473–1535) was a Roman Catholic bishop and cardinal.

== Biography ==
Louis de Gorrevod was born in the province of Bresse, the property of the House of Savoy, perhaps in the city of Bourg, c. 1472, the son of Jean de Gorrevod and Jeanne de Loriol-Challes. Jean de Gorrevod was the son of Hugonin Seigneur de Gorrevod; he had three brothers and a sister; Jean's brother Guillaume died without issue, but in his Testament, dated 19 September 1482, he left his property to his nephews Laurent and Louis. Louis' elder brother, Laurent, became a Councilor of Marguerite of Austria and Governor of Bresse, and was Baron of Montanay and Count of Pont-de-Vaux; he was one of the executors of Regent Marguerite's Last Will and Testament. Laurent and Louis also had a sister Jeanne.

Early in his career, he was a protonotary apostolic. He was also the Almoner of the Duke of Savoy. On 27 January 1499, he became a canon of the cathedral chapter of St. Pierre Cathedral in Geneva.

== Saint-Jean-de-Maurienne ==
On 29 July 1499, five days after the death of Bishop Étienne de Morel, the ten canons who formed the Chapter of the Cathedral of Saint-Jean met to elect his successor. Names were proposed and discussed. When the vote was taken, they chose the twenty-six year old Louis de Gorrevod as their bishop. On 9 August 1499, his election as Bishop of Saint-Jean-de-Maurienne was approved, though he continued to live in Geneva. For Saint-Jean-de-Maurienne he was assigned an auxiliary bishop, Jean de Joly, titular Bishop of Hebron in the Holy Land.

Like his predecessor, Louis de Gorrevod was also Abbot Commendatory of the Monastery of S. Maria de Ambronay (Ambrogniaci), and Abbot Commendatory of the Monastery of St. Pierre de Berne. He was also ex officio patron of the Priory of Brou (founded by Marguerite of Austria in 1521) and a member of the college of the priests of the Church of Nôtre-Dame. In 1501, he had officiated at the marriage of Philibert II, Duke of Savoy and Margaret of Austria in Romain-Moûtiers. From 1507 to 1509, he occasionally carried out functions for François Brunaud, auxiliary bishop of Geneva and Vicar-General of the Diocese. From 1495 to 1509 there was no Bishop of Geneva. The diocese was being administered by the Bishop of Lausanne.

At the beginning of the sixteenth century the Bishops of Saint-Jean-de-Maurienne still enjoyed considerable powers of both an ecclesiastical and political sort, as vassals of the Dukes of Savoy. On 2 March 1506 Bishop Louis de Gorrevod, in an act of reform, issued a set of Constitutions regulating the relationship between the bishop, his officers, the communes and vassals of the Bishopric. This applied particularly to the episcopal collectors of taxes, including the taille and the décime (dîme), and to the various officials who demanded endless paperwork, for each piece of which a fee was imposed.

== Bourg-en-Bresse ==
On 17 May 1515 Pope Leo X elevated the diocese of Turin to the status of Metropolitan, with an Archbishop. Savoy was being highly favored. On 21 May he created the Archbishopric of Chambéry. The diocese of Bourg-en-Bresse was created on 21 May 1515 by the Bull Pro excellenti praeminentia of Pope Leo X, perhaps at the request of the Emperor Maximilian, perhaps at the request of the Emperor's daughter, Marguerite d'Autriche, whose dowry included Bresse, and certainly at the request of Duke Charles III. Bishop Louis de Gorrevod was one of four ambassadors sent to Rome to congratulate the new Pope, Leo X, on his election to the Papacy, and to thank him for the ecclesiastical promotions. The creation of the diocese of Bourg caused no pleasure to the Primate of the Gauls, the Archbishop of Lyon, François de Rohan, whose ecclesiastical territory had included Bresse. Nor did the increased prestige of Savoy and encroachment on Gaul please King Francis I of France. In 1515, Louis de Gorrevod became the first Bishop of Bourg-en-Bresse.

After the Battle of Marignano and the Concordat of 18 August 1516 between France and Leo X, the new diocese was suppressed. From 1516, therefore, Louis de Gorrevod was again only bishop of Saint-Jean-de-Maurienne, and the Canons of his Cathedral of Bourg were only canons of a collegiate church. But the diocese was reestablished by Leo X on 13 November 1521, eighteen days before his death, and so therefore were the Bishop and Canons.

On 19 October 1528, Bishop de Gorrevod acted as proxy for Marguerite d'Autriche at the baptism of Prince Emanuel-Philibert, the future Duke of Savoy, in the Saint-Chapelle of the Castle of Chambéry.

== Cardinal ==
Cardinal's galero with fiocchi

Bishop Louis de Gorrevod was created a cardinal priest in the consistory of 9 March 1530 by Pope Clement VII. He received the red hat and the titular church of San Cesareo in Palatio on 16 May 1530. On 5 December 1530, the pope made him Papal Legate to all the domains of the Duke of Savoy, thereby making him the supreme ecclesiastical authority in the realms of the Duke of Savoy next after the Pope himself. It is said that Cardinal de Gorrevod resigned his see of Bourg-en-Bresse in favor of his nephew Jean-Philibert de Challes on 10 April 1532.

Cardinal de Gorrevod did not participate in the papal Conclave of 11–12 October 1534, which elected Cardinal Alessandro Farnese, who chose the name Paul III.

On 8 April 1534, Cardinal de Gorrevod presided over the ceremony of the transfer of the "Holy Shroud" (pannus Sindon nuncupatus), which had suffered serious damage from fire, from the Sainte Chapelle in the castle of Chambéry, where it was being kept by its owner the Duke of Savoy, to the Convent of the Poor Clares in Chambéry, where repair work was to be done on the cloth. The procès verbal of Cardinal de Gorrevod, giving full details of the event, survives.

Cardinal de Gorrevod resigned the diocese of Bourg-en-Bresse in 1534 and the diocese was once again suppressed, on 4 January 1535 by Pope Paul III.

Cardinal de Gorrevod died in Saint-Jean-de-Maurienne on 22 April 1535. He was buried in the cathedral of Saint-Jean-Baptiste in Saint-Jean-de-Maurienne, before the high altar, where his memorial inscription gives the date of 1535:

Hic iacet Reverendissimus in Christo Pater Dominus Ludovicus de Gorrevodo
Tit. Sancti Caesarei in Palatio Presbyter Cardinalis Maurianensis nuncupatus Sabaudiae Legatus,
qui hoc sacellum fundavit et dotavit, Anno Domini M.D.XXXV

== Bibliography ==
- Aubery, Antoine (1645). Histoire generalle des cardinaux dédiée à Monseigneur l'Eminentissime Cardinal Duc de Richelieu (in French). Vol. Troisieme partie. Paris: chez J. Jost. pp. 402–405.
- Chagny, André (1905). "L' éveché de Bourg-en-Bresse". Bulletin de la Société Gorini. 2: 131–158.
- Chagny, André (1906). "L' éveché de Bourg-en-Bresse (suite)". Bulletin de la Société Gorini. 3: 48–66, 144–176.
- Chagny, André (1907). "L' éveché de Bourg-en-Bresse (suite)". Bulletin de la Société Gorini. 4: 62–84.
- Burnier, Eugène (1863). "Les constitutions du Cardinal Louis II de Gorrevod, évêque de Maurienne et prince (1506). Étude historique". Mémoires et documents de la Société Savoisienne d'Histoire et d'Archéologie. VII: 225–271.
- Guichenon, Samuel (1778). Histoire Genealogique de la Royale Maison de Savoie (in French). Vol. Tome II (nouvelle ed.). Turin: J.-M. Briolo.
- Konrad Eubel (1901). Hierarchia catholica medii aevi: 1434-1503 (in Latin). Vol. II. Munster: Monasterii, sumptibus et typis librariae Regensbergianae.
- Gulik, Guilelmus van; Konrad Eubel (1923). L. Schmitz-Kallenberg (ed.). Hierarchia catholica medii aevi (in Latin). Vol. III (editio altera ed.). Münster: sumptibus et typis librariae Regensbergianae.
