= Laurent de Gorrevod =

French-Savoyard nobleman

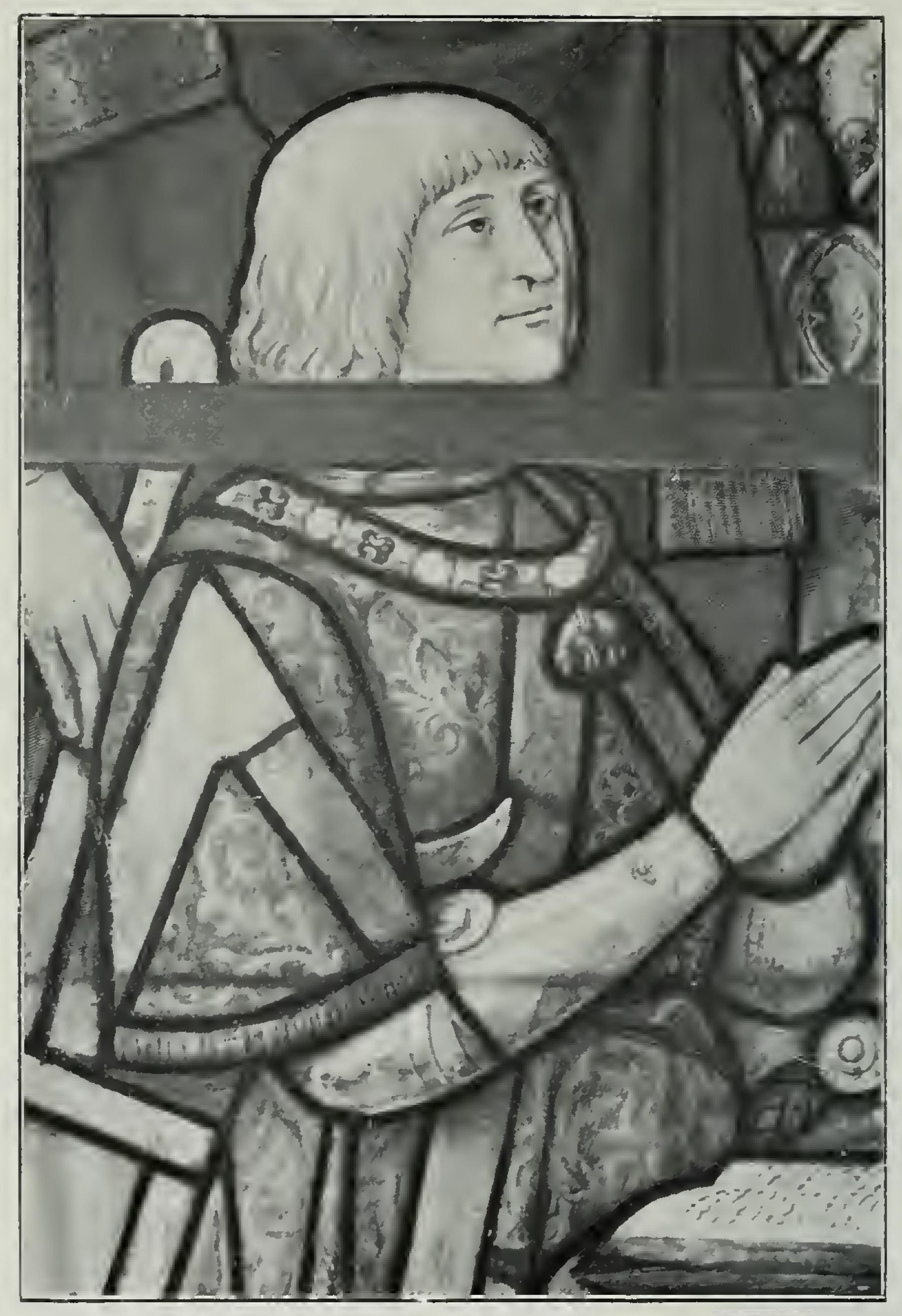
Gorrevod depicted on a stained glass window in the monastery of Brou.

Laurent de Gorrevod, also known as Laurent de Gouvenot or Lorenzo de Garrevod (Bresse, ca. 1470 – Barcelona, 6 August 1529), was a nobleman from what was then the Burgundian State and later from the Savoyard state who was a confidant and envoy of Margaret of Austria, Governess of the Habsburg Netherlands. He also became a confidant of Emperor Charles V, who granted him in 1518 a license that marked the start of the transatlantic slave trade between Africa and the Spanish colonies in America.

== Biography ==
Laurent de Gorrevod was a brother of Cardinal Louis de Gorrevod. From his ancestors, Laurent de Gorrevod inherited the title of baron of Marney and Montenai and lands in Bresse. In 1497, he was a squire in the service of Philibert II of Savoy and in 1504 he was governor of Bresse, then ruled by the House of Savoy.
Three years after the death of Philibert II, his widow Margaret of Austria returned to the Habsburg Netherlands to become governess, after the unexpected death of her brother Philip the Handsome. Gorrevod accompanied her and rose quickly in her service as financial expert and a member of her Council.

His privileged position at Court gave him also access to the young prince and later Emperor Charles V and became in 1515 his 2nd Chamberlain. He accompanied his lord on his first trip to Spain in 1517 and was present at the coronation of Charles V in Valladolid in 1518. In 1516 Gorrevod was accepted into the Order of the Golden Fleece, in 1520 he became Viscount of Salins and in 1521 Count of Pont-de-Vaux.

In August 1518 he received from Charles V the first Asiento de negros, which dealt with the deportation of 4,000 Africans to the Spanish Americas. He sold this license in several parts to Genoese merchants.

Gorrevod also performed several diplomatic missions for Margaret and Charles. He acted as Charles V's mediator in the conflict between the archbishop and the city of Besançon, was sent to London in 1520 and reported to Margaret of Austria from the Diet of Worms in the spring of 1521.

As Mayordomo mayor of the King in Spain, he held an important position at Charles V's court from 1522. In 1526 he signed the Treaty of Madrid ending the capture of King Francis I of France.

In 1527 he signed his will at his castle of Marney. He died in Barcelona after taking part in the negotiations that led to the Treaty of Cambrai. He was buried in the Monastère royal of Brou outside Bourg-en-Bresse, where his first lord Philibert II of Savoy was also buried.
