= Asiento de Negros =

Spanish licence for monopoly of the slave trade in exchange for a loan

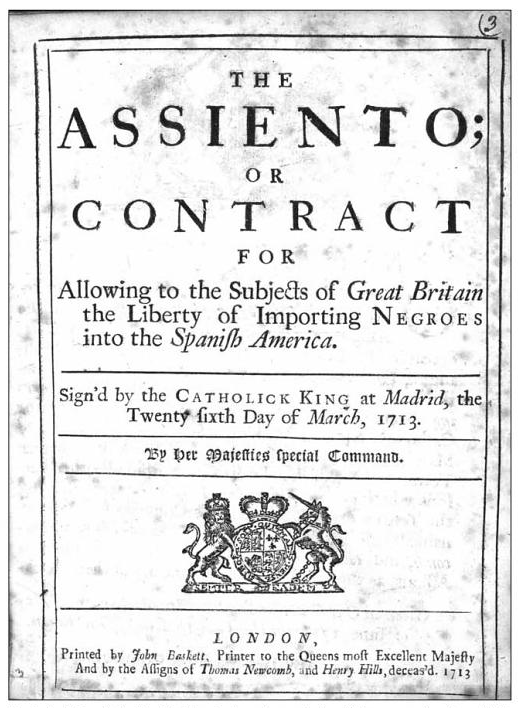
Cover of the English translation of the Asiento contract signed by Britain and Spain in 1713 as part of the Utrecht treaty that ended the War of Spanish Succession. The contract granted exclusive rights to Britain to sell slaves in the Spanish Indies.

The Asiento de Negros (lit. 'settlement of blacks') was a monopoly contract between the Spanish Crown and various merchants for the right to provide enslaved Africans to colonies in the Spanish Americas. The Spanish Empire rarely engaged in the transatlantic slave trade directly from Africa itself, choosing instead to contract out the importation to foreign merchants from nations more prominent in that part of the world, typically Portuguese and Genoese, but later the Dutch, French, and British. The Asiento did not concern French or British Caribbean, or Brazil, but only Spanish America.

The 1479 Treaty of Alcáçovas divided the Atlantic Ocean and other parts of the globe into two zones of influence, Spanish and Portuguese. The Spanish acquired the west side, covering South America and the West Indies, whilst the Portuguese obtained the east side, covering the west coast of Africa – and also the Indian Ocean beyond. The Spanish relied on enslaved African labourers to support their American colonial project, but now lacked any trading or territorial foothold in West Africa, the principal source of slave labour. The Spanish relied on Portuguese slave traders to fill their requirements. The contract was usually obtained by foreign merchant banks that cooperated with local or foreign traders, that specialized in shipping. Different organisations and individuals would bid for the right to hold the asiento.

The original impetus to import enslaved Africans was to relieve the indigenous inhabitants of the colonies from the labour demands of Spanish colonists. The enslavement of Amerindians had been halted by the influence of Dominicans such as Bartolomé de las Casas. Spain gave individual asientos to Portuguese merchants to bring African slaves to South America.

After the Peace of Münster, in 1648, Dutch merchants became involved in the Asiento de Negros. In 1713, the British were awarded the right to the asiento in the Treaty of Utrecht, which ended the War of the Spanish Succession. The British government passed its rights to the South Sea Company. The British asiento ended with the 1750 Treaty of Madrid between Great Britain and Spain after the War of Jenkins' Ear, known appropriately by the Spanish as the Guerra del Asiento ("War of the Asiento").

== Asientos ==
An asiento, in the Spanish language, is a short-term loan or debt contract, of about one to four years, signed between the Spanish crown and a banker or a small group of bankers (asentistas) against future crown revenues, often included after peace treaties were signed. An asiento covered one or a combination of three specific transactions: an unsecured short-term loan, a transfer of payment, and a currency exchange contract. Between the early 16th and the mid-18th century, asientos were used by the Spanish treasurer to adjust short-term imbalances between revenues and expenditures. The sovereign promised to repay the principal of the loan plus high interest (12%). The participant bankers in Seville, Lisbon, Republic of Genoa and Amsterdam, in turn, drew on the profits and direct investments obtained from a large number of Atlantic merchants. In exchange for a set of scheduled payments, merchants and financiers were given the right to collect relevant taxes or oversee the trade in those commodities that fell under the monarch's prerogative. In this way a set of merchants received the right to ship tobacco, salt, sugar and cacao on a trade route from the Spanish West Indies, some times accompanied by licences to export bullion from Spanish Main or Cádiz. In particular, the asiento would result in great impact for the economy of Spanish American colonies, because the treaty secured or would secure fixed revenues for the crown and the supply of the region with certain commodities, whereas the contracting party bore the risk of the trade. A new asiento was the safest means to get their money back and cash their arrears.

== History of the Asiento ==
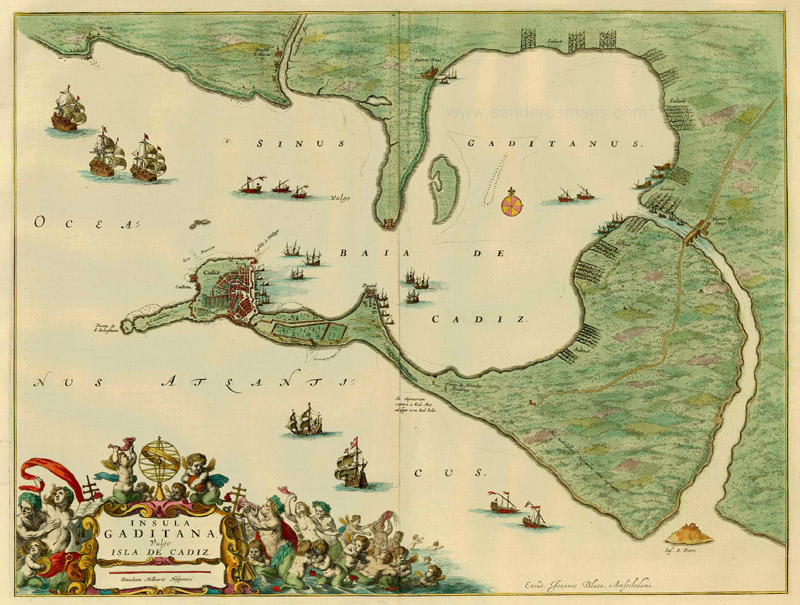
The island of Cádiz by Blaeu in 1662.

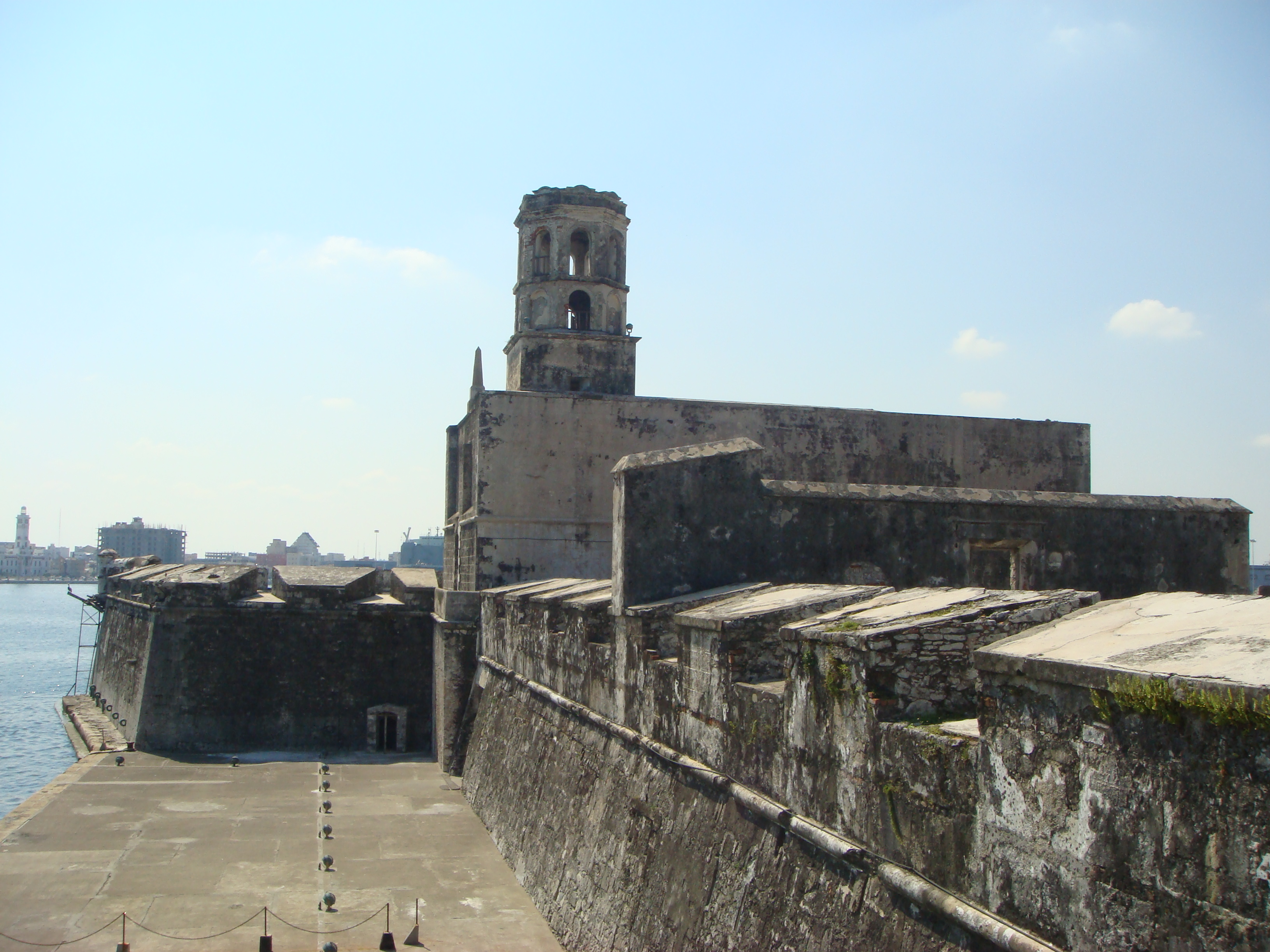
San Juan de Ulúa, Spanish fort in Veracruz, Mexico (2008)

=== Background in the Spanish Americas ===
The general meaning of asiento (from the Spanish verb sentar, to sit, which was derived from the Latin sedere) in Spanish is "consent" or "settlement, establishment". In a commercial context, it means "contract, trading agreement". In the words of Georges Scelle, it was "a term in Spanish public law which designates every contract made for the purpose of public utility...between the Spanish government and private individuals."

The Asiento system was established following Spanish settlement in the Caribbean when the indigenous population was undergoing demographic collapse and the Spanish needed another source of labour. Initially, a few Christian Africans born in Iberia were transported to the Caribbean. But as the indigenous demographic collapse was ongoing and opponents of the Spanish exploitation of indigenous labour grew, including that of Bartolomé de Las Casas (although rescinding his views later), the young Habsburg king Charles I of Spain allowed for the direct importation of slaves from Africa (bozales) to the Caribbean. The first asiento for selling slaves was drawn up in August 1518, granting a Flemish favourite of Charles, Laurent de Gouvenot, a monopoly on importing enslaved Africans for eight years with a maximum of 4,000. Gouvenot promptly sold his licence to the treasurer of the Casa de la Contratación de Indias and three subcontractors, Genoese merchants in Andalusia, for 25,000 ducats. The Casa de Contratación in Seville controlled both trade and immigration to the New World, excluding Jews, conversos, Muslims, and foreigners. African slaves were considered merchandise, and their imports were regulated by the crown. The Spanish crown collected a duty on each "pieza", and not on each individual slave delivered. Spain had neither direct access to the African sources of slaves nor the ability to transport them, so the asiento system was a way to ensure a legal supply of Africans to the New World, which brought revenue to the Spanish crown.

=== Portuguese monopoly ===
For the Spanish crown, the asiento was a source of profit. Haring says, "The asiento remained the settled policy of the Spanish government for controlling and profiting from the slave trade." In Habsburg Spain, asientos were a basic method of financing state expenditures: "Borrowing took two forms – long-term debt in the form of perpetual bonds (juros), and short-term loan contracts provided by bankers (asientos). Many asientos were eventually converted or refinanced through juros."

Initially, since Portugal had unimpeded rights in West Africa via its 1494 treaty, it dominated the European slave trade of Africans. Before the onset of the official asiento in 1595, when the Spanish monarch also ruled Portugal in the Iberian Union (1580–1640), the Spanish fiscal authorities gave individual asientos to merchants, primarily from Portugal, to bring slaves to the Americas. For the 1560s most of these slaves were obtained in the Upper Guinea area, especially in the Sierra Leone region where there were many wars associated with the Mandé invasions.

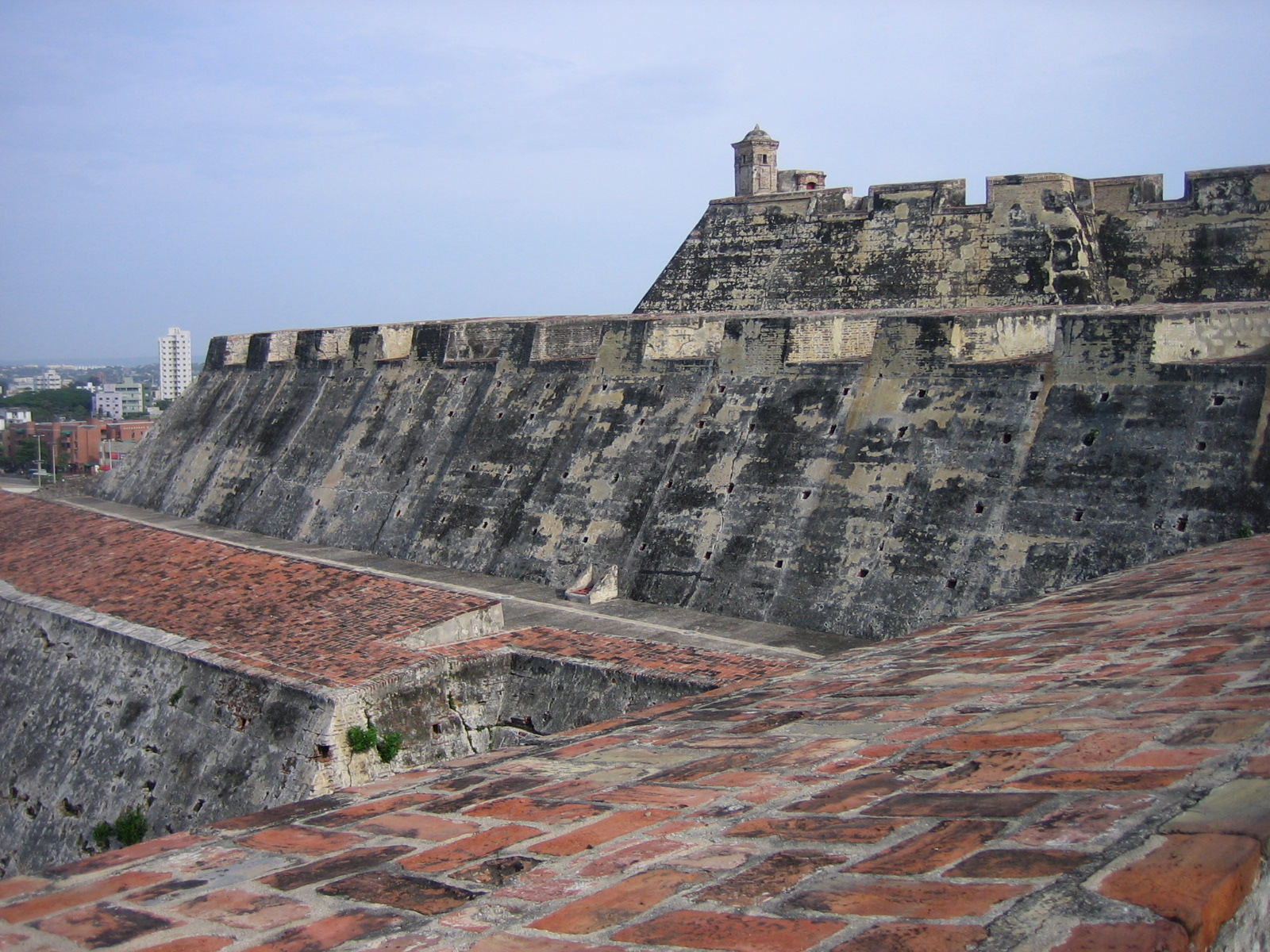
San Felipe, Spanish fort in Cartagena (Colombia).

Following the establishment of the Portuguese colony of Angola in 1575, and the gradual replacement of São Tomé by Brazil as the primary producer of sugar, Angolan interests came to dominate the trade, and it was Portuguese financiers and merchants who obtained the larger-scale, comprehensive asiento that was established in 1595 during the period of the Iberian Union. The asiento was extended to the importation of African slaves to Brazil, with those holding asientos for the Brazilian slave trade often also trading slaves in Spanish America. Spanish America was a major market for African slaves, including many of whom exceeded the quota of the asiento license and were illegally sold. From the period between 1595 and 1622, approximately half of all imported slaves were destined for Mexico. Most smuggled slaves were not brought by freelance traders.

Angolan dominance of the trade was pronounced after 1615 when the governors of Angola, starting with Bento Banha Cardoso, allied with Imbangala mercenaries to wreak havoc on the local African powers. Many of these governors also held the contract of Angola as well as the asiento, thus insuring their interests. Shipping registers from Vera Cruz and Cartagena show that as many as 85% of the slaves arriving in Spanish ports were from Angola, brought by Portuguese ships. In 1637 the Dutch West India Company employed Portuguese merchants in the trade. The earlier asiento period came to an end in 1640 when Portugal revolted against Spain, though even then the Portuguese continued to supply Spanish colonies.

=== Dutch, French and British competition ===
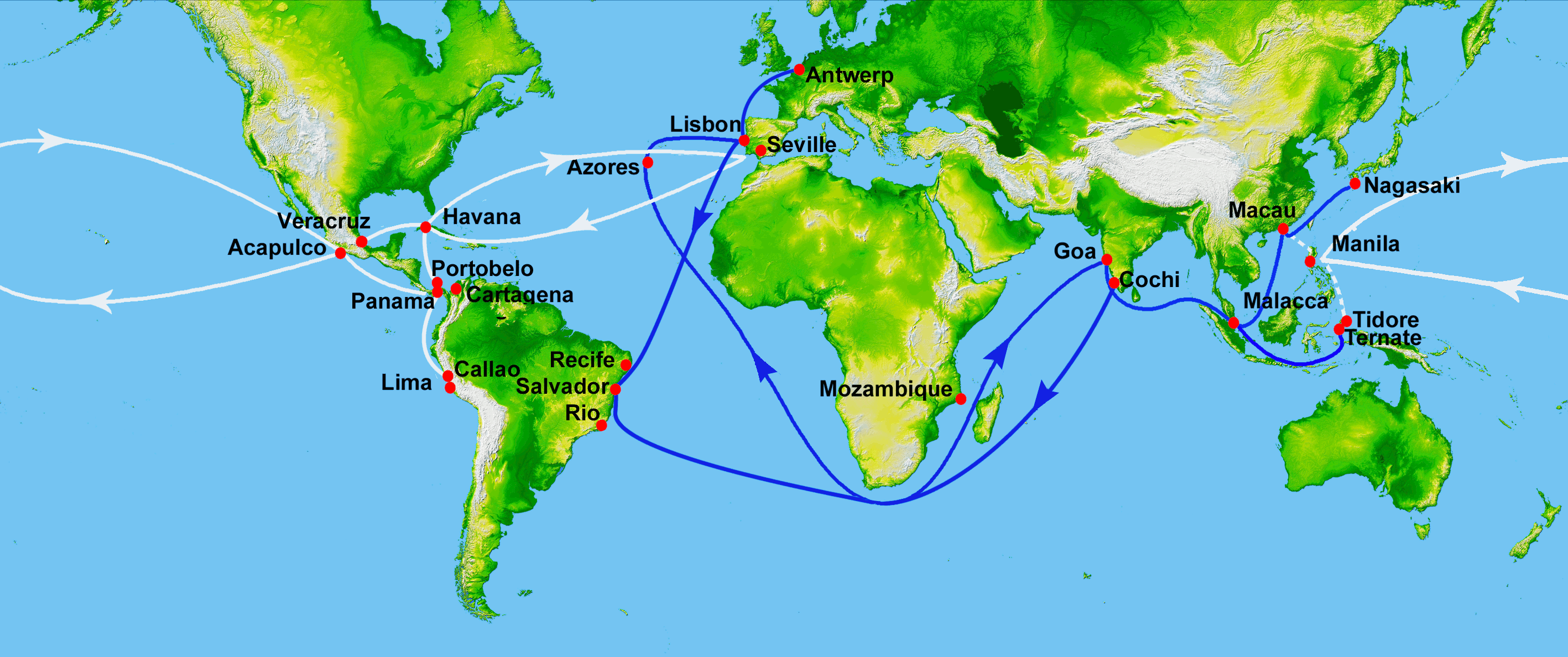
Main Spanish trade routes (white), showing the location of Seville, Havana, Portobelo, Cartagena and Veracruz.

In 1647, the Dutch reached a provisional peace agreement with Spain, recognizing the status quo in the East and West Indies, as well as the patents of the Dutch East India and the West India Company. In the 1650s after Portugal achieved its independence from Spain, Spain denied the asiento to the Portuguese, whom it considered rebels. Spain sought to enter the slave trade directly, sending ships to Angola to purchase slaves. It also toyed with the idea of a military alliance with Kongo, the powerful African kingdom north of Angola. But these ideas were abandoned and the Spanish returned to Portuguese and then Dutch interests to supply slaves. (Captain Holmes's expedition captured or destroyed all the Dutch settlements on Ghana's coast.) The Spanish awarded large contracts for the asiento to the Genovese banker Grillo in the 1660s and the Dutch West India Company in 1675 rather than Portuguese merchants in the 1670s and 1680s. However, this same period saw a resurgence of piracy. In 1700, with the death of the last Habsburg monarch, Charles II of Spain, his will named the House of Bourbon in the form of Philip V of Spain as the successor to the Spanish throne. The Bourbon family were also Kings of France and so the asiento was granted in 1702 to the French Guinea Company, for the importation of 48,000 African slaves over a decade. The Africans were transported to the French Caribbean colonies of Martinique and Saint Domingue(now Haiti).

As part of their strategy of maintaining a balance of power in Europe, Great Britain and her allies, including the Dutch and the Portuguese, disputed the Bourbon inheritance of the Spanish throne and fought in the War of the Spanish Succession against Bourbon hegemony. Although Britain did not prevail, it did receive the asiento as part of the Peace of Utrecht. (Note: Similar patents in the British system were the Virginia Company, the Levant Company and the Merchant Adventurers' patent of trade with the United Provinces (essentially concurrent with the modern-day Netherlands). An overview of the British system from a Marxist perspective is given by Robert Brenner, on the editorial board of the New Left Review, in "Merchants and Revolution".) This granted Britain a thirty-year asiento to send one merchant ship to the Spanish port of Portobelo, furnishing 4800 slaves to the Spanish colonies. The asiento became a conduit for British contraband and smugglers of all kinds, which undermined Spain's attempts to keep a protectionist trading system with its American colonies. Disputes connected with it led to the War of Jenkins' Ear (1739). Britain gave up its rights to the asiento after the war, in the Treaty of Madrid of 1750, as Spain was implementing several administrative and economic reforms. The Spanish Crown bought out the South Sea Company's right to the asiento that year. The Spanish Crown sought another way to supply African slaves, attempting to liberalize its traffic, trying to shift to a system of the free trade in slaves by Spaniards and foreigners in particular colonial locations. These were Cuba, Santo Domingo, Puerto Rico, and Caracas, all of which used African slaves in large numbers.

== Holders of the Asiento ==
=== Early: 1518–1595 ===
- 1518–1527: Laurent de Gouvenot (aka Lorenzo de Gorrevod or Garrebod), ex-Governor of Bresse and Mayordomo mayor of Charles I of Spain. The first known transatlantic slave ship—sailed from São Tomé in 1525.
  - Outsourced to Domingo de Forne, Agustín de Ribaldo and Fernando Vázquez, all Genoese established in Seville.
- 1528–1536: The Welser and Fugger families from Augsburg. The Welser family is granted with the Asiento in Venezuela Province but dispossessed of the Asiento following complaints about their treatment of Native American workers.
- 1565: King Philip II grants Pedro Menéndez de Avilés an asiento with expansive trade privileges, the power to distribute lands, and licenses to sell 500 slaves, as well as various titles, including that of adelantado of Florida.

=== Portuguese: 1595–1640 ===
Six Asientos were granted to:

- 30 January 1595 – 13 May 1601: Pedro Gomes Reynel (Note: Reinel introduced 25,000 slaves to Brazil in the following six years. This agreement introduced well-defined characteristics in this type of contract. According to its clauses, Reynel was obliged to introduce 4,250 African slaves annually into the Indies; he could grant "licences" to anyone who wanted them and he would be in charge of completing the required total if necessary.)
- 13 May 1601 – 16 October 1604: João Rodrigues Coutinho.
- 16 October 1604 – 27 September 1615: Gonçalo Vaz Coutinho
- 27 September 1615 – 1 April 1623: António Fernandes de Elvas. The two main places in the Spanish Americas that slaves were brought were Cartagena de Indias (in modern Colombia) and Veracruz (in modern Mexico) from here they were distributed out towards what is today Venezuela, the Antilles and Lima (through Portobello and Panama) then to Upper Peru and Potosí.
- 1 April 1623 – 25 September 1631: Manuel Rodrigues Lamego; 59 ships were licensed for Africa, where around 8,000 African slaves were purchased from West African merchants, mostly from Luanda.
- 25 September 1631 – 1 December 1640: Melchor Gómez Angel and Cristóvão Mendes de Sousa.

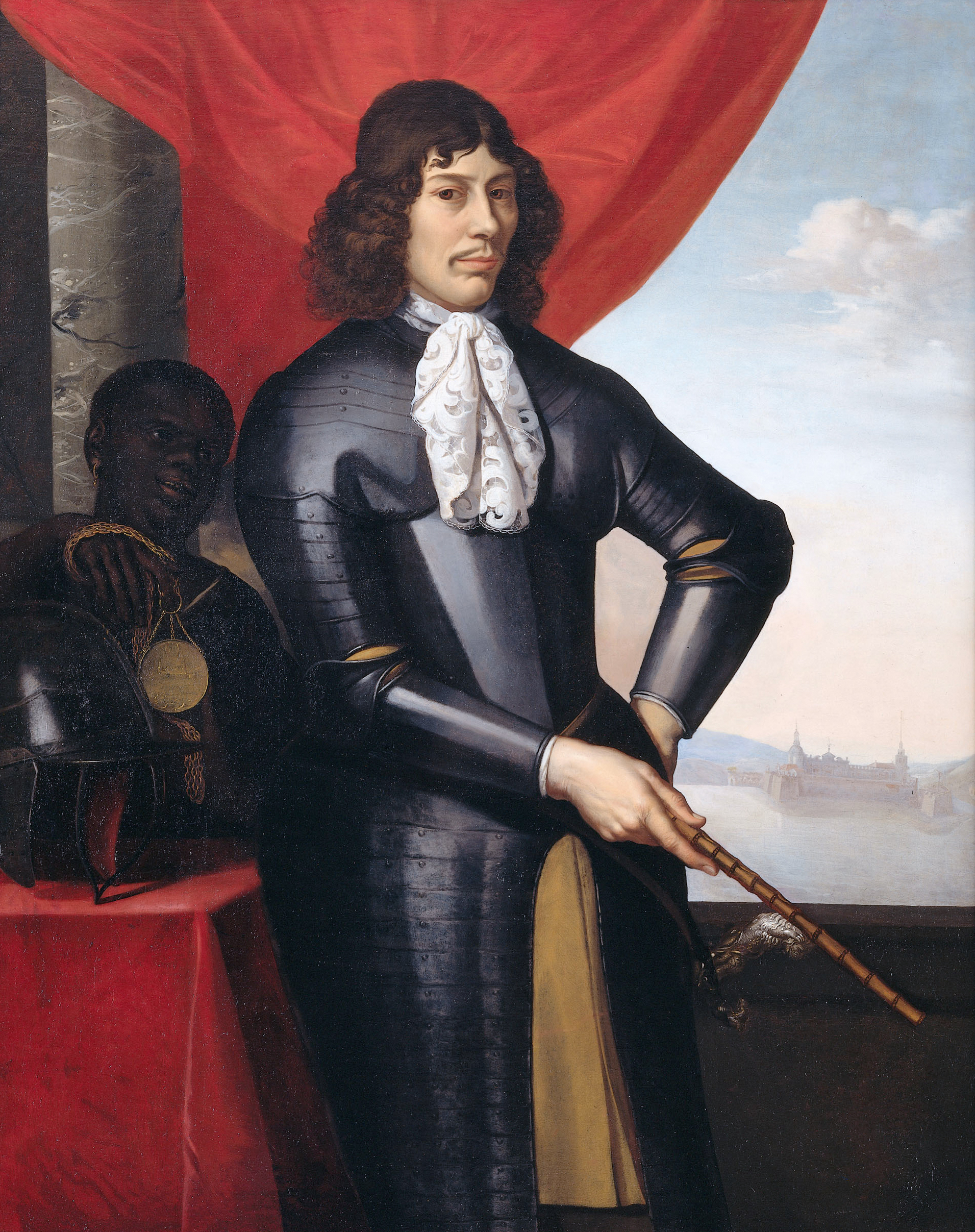
Jan Valckenburgh

In 1640 the Iberian Union fell apart; the Portuguese Restoration War began. Between 1640 and 1651 there was no asiento. ) Slave arrivals to the Spanish Americas declined precipitously. On 12 July 1641 Portugal and the Dutch Republic signed a 'Treaty of Offensive and Defensive Alliance', otherwise known as the Treaty of The Hague. Dutch ships were allowed in any Portuguese port for ten years. Dutch merchant Jan Valckenburgh saw an opportunity but was expelled from Loango-Angola in 1648. Dutch private entrepreneurs were responsible for almost half of the total investment in slave trade against a smaller share held by the WIC.

The Invasion of Jamaica was the casus belli that resulted in the actual Anglo-Spanish War (1654-1660). In March 1659 the Danish Africa Company was started by the Finnish Hendrik Carloff and two Dutchmen. Their mandate included trade with the Danish Gold Coast. Their goal was to compete with the Dutch, the Swedish Africa Company and the Portuguese. The Dutch competed with the Company of Royal Adventurers Trading to Africa founded in 1660. Both of these slaving powers had a strong presence on the Gold Coast and the Bight of Benin; many slaves came from Cross River (Nigeria), Calabar in the Bight of Biafra and West Central Africa. The Dutch and Portuguese signed a new Treaty of The Hague (1661). Matthias Beck, who had left Dutch Brazil in 1654, was appointed by the WIC as governor of Curaçao, that, from 1662 to 1728 and intermittently thereafter, functioned as an entrepôt through which captives on Dutch transatlantic ships reached Spanish colonies. A second branch of the intra-American slave traffic originated in Barbados and the Colony of Jamaica.

=== Genoese: 1662–1671 ===
In 1658 Ambrogio Lomellini and Domenico Grillo were appointed as Treasurers of the Holy Crusade, waging war against "infidels". This fact allowed them to have access to a part of the treasures that came from America. (From the late 1640s Grillo and his business partner Lomellini lived in Madrid.) In 1662 and 1666 Spain (or the royal finances) were bankrupt. Slave-contracts of the WIC with Grillo and Lomellini of Madrid, 1662 and 1667, who were permitted to sub-contract to any nation friendly to Spain.

- July 5, 1662 – 1669: Grillo and Lomellini promised to ship 24,000 slaves in seven years, assisted by the Dutch West India Company and the English Royal Adventurers from Jamaica to Cartagena, Colombia, Veracruz in Mexico and Portobello in Panama. In 1664, the political situation in Europe and the Caribbean was volatile, leading to Second Anglo-Dutch War. Robert Holmes captured the Dutch trading post of Cabo Verde in June 1664 and confiscated several ships of the Dutch West India company. The Duke of York, governor of the Royal Africa Company, envied the Dutch trade in slaves to Spanish America.
- Cristóbal Calderón, the attorney general or "procurador" of Havana, requests, on behalf of his city, a license to sail directly to the coasts of Guinea and Angola to supply themselves in slaves instead of relying on those the Asiento brought in from Barbados and Curaçao. Havana, April 28, 1664.
- In January 1667, Grillo and Lomelin convinced the Council of the Indies to return 100,000 pesos to the Asiento to restore the slaving negotiations with the British and the Dutch.
- Grillo and Lomellini contacted nl:Francesco Ferroni in Amsterdam and then turned to the Dutch to fulfil the conditions of their contract. Grillo's monopoly was bitterly received in the colonies. He operated almost exclusively by proxy. In 1668 when Grillo's estate was threatened with confiscation because of enormous debts, he succeeded in an extension of the Asiento for two years.
- In 1668 an immense warehouse was erected on baren island of Curaçao. About 90% of the slaves were exported from Curaçao and half of them illegally.
  - In 1669 Spain is almost bankrupt. The Coymans bank in Amsterdam transported on four warships Spanish dollars or bars of silver (worth 500,000 guilders) from New Spain to Cadiz in order to get a subcontract. Also King Charles II of England tried to acquire the asiento.
  - The Treaty of Madrid (1670) was highly favourable to England, as its ownership of territories in the Caribbean Sea was confirmed by Spain. England agreed to suppress piracy in the Caribbean and in return Spain agreed to permit English ships freedom of movement. Both agreed to refrain from trading in the other's Caribbean territory and to limit trading to their possessions.
- In 1671 the Grillo asiento is ended because of mistrust. Grillo's experience opened up the way for expansion of the Dutch, English and French slave trading companies.
  - In 1671, the privateer Henry Morgan, licensed by the English government, sacked and burned the city of Panamá Viejo an important port on the Pacific used by Grillo for slave trade along the coast.
  - In 1672 the Royal Africa Company was founded, headed by the Duke of York.
  - In 1673 the Compagnie du Sénégal was founded and used Gorée to house the slaves since 1677. According to historical accounts, no more than 500 slaves per year were traded there.
  - 1674: The French West India Company went bankrupt; the Dutch lost New Amsterdam and New Netherlands in the Third Anglo-Dutch War.
  - 1675: The Dutch New West India Company restarted; Curaçao seems to have become a free port for sugar, slaves and contraband.

=== Dutch & Portuguese: 1671–1701 ===
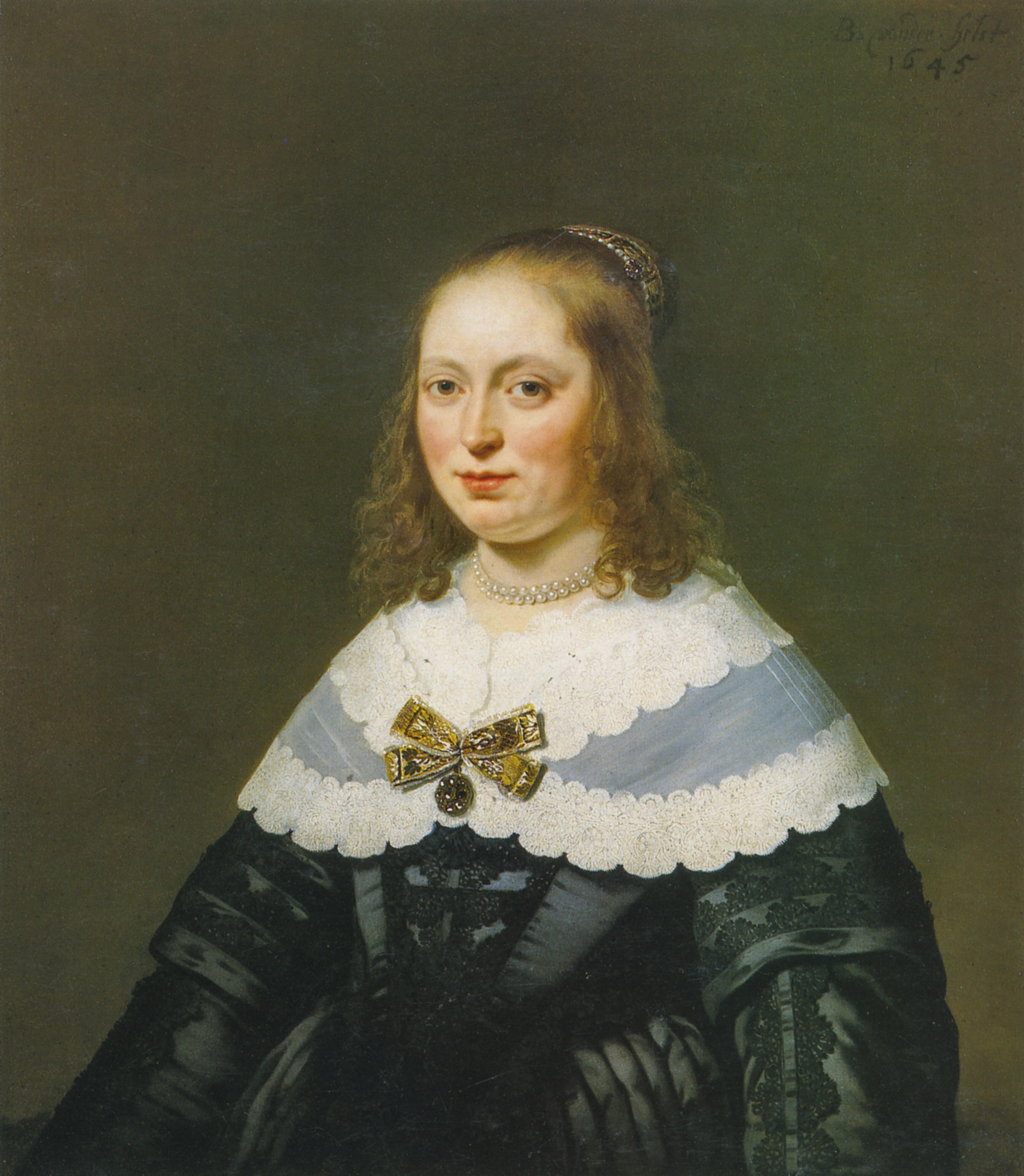
From 1657 to 1679 Sophia Trip managed the Coymans company, which financed and organized the slave trade. Portrait by Bartholomeus van der Helst (1645).

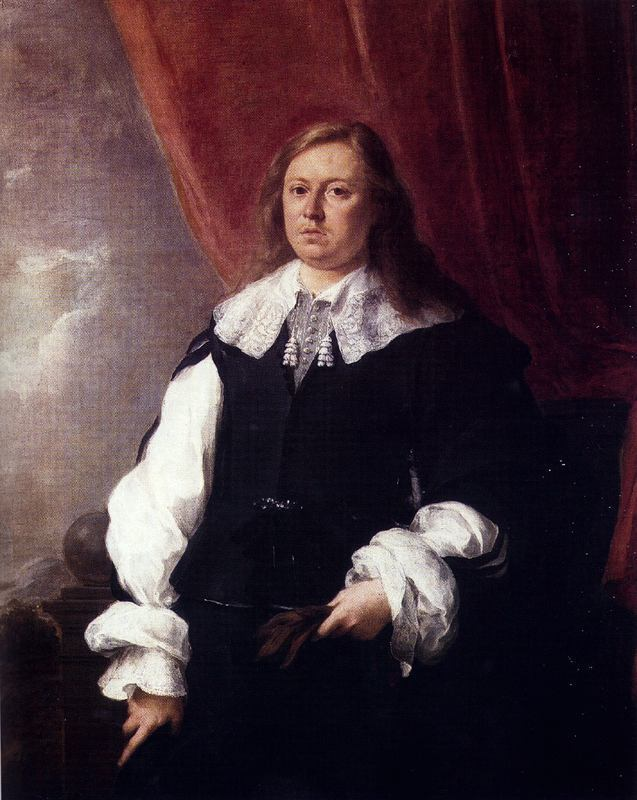
The Dutch merchant in Cadiz Joshua van Belle, involved with his brother Pedro van Belle in the slave trade, painting by Murillo in 1670, National Gallery of Ireland, Dublin.

In 1661 the Dutch and the Portuguese signed a peace. The beginning of the slave trade on Curaçao is in 1665. In 1666 France and Denmark declared war on England. After the Second Anglo-Dutch War the Dutch and the English signed the Treaty of Breda and New York became British. The Treaty of Lisbon (1668) ended the war between Spain and Portugal. In 1674, the WIC made Curaçao a free port, giving it a key position in the international networks, especially the slave trade.

- 1671–1674: António Garcia, a Portuguese, was the heir of Lomelino. In 1675 he looked for assistance from Balthasar and his brother Joseph Coymans and the Dutch West India Company, financing the loan and the shipping. Garcia arranged to purchase all the slaves in Curaçao.
- 1676–1679: Manuel Hierro de Castro, and Manuel José Cortizos, members of the Consulado de Sevilla. The Spanish proposed to get the slaves from Cape Verde, located on the demarcation line between the Spanish and Portuguese empire, but this was against the WIC-charter. The Dutch offered to bring the slaves to Hispaniola or the ports on the Spanish Main. From 1662 to 1690, only twenty slaving vessels set out under the Spanish flag, mostly between 1677 and 1681, an average of less than one a year.
  - [Señor. El Maestro Fray Juan de Castro, Religioso de la Orden de Santo Domingo, dize : Que por el año de 1678 hollandose en la Ciudad de Cádiz, le solicitaron D. Baltasar Coymans, y Pedro Bambelle de Nacion Olandeses, para la disposicion de un Asiento, que se auia de hazer para comerciar à Indias, haziendole grandes ofertas... y auian de ser Españoles los que le auian de hazer; y reconociendo... que se trataua de adulterar el comercio...]
- In May 1679 the Coymans financed slave transports, organized by Captain Juan Barroso del Pozo, of 9,800 "negros" to Curaçao.
- In 1680, Barroso from Seville and Nicolás Porcio, his Venetian son-in-law, became asentistas.
- 1682–1688: Juan Barroso del Pozo (−1683) and Nicolás Porcio succeeded in getting the asiento for 6.5 years. It was Porcio who encountered many financial difficulties after the loss of ships and slaves. In 1683 he travelled to Portobelo but was taken, prisoner. He was unable to make his payments to the crown, alleging that the local authorities in Cartagena were working against his interests.
  - 1683 Dutch privateers attacked Veracruz and Cartagena.
  - In 1684 Genoa was heavily bombarded by a French fleet as punishment for its alliance with Spain.
- February 1685 – March 1687: Balthasar Coymans succeeded in ousting Porcio. The cash payment to the Spanish government, an indispensable feature of this bargain, was furnished by the Amsterdam house of Coymans. Coymans made an immediate payment towards some frigates for the Spanish navy being built in Amsterdam and an advance on the dues he would be liable for on goods imported to Spanish America.
  - Royal Order, signed "El Rey", commanding Don Balthasar Coymans, Don Juan Barrosa and Don Nicolás Porzio to assemble ten Capuchin monks (Franciscan friars) from either Cadiz or Amsterdam to sail to the coast of Africa to buy slaves, to convert them to Christianity and sell them in the West Indies, 25 March 1685 Balthasar & Johan Coymans.
  - Carta de Rodrigo Gómez a [Manuel Diego López de Zúñiga Mendoza Sotomayor, X] Duque de Béjar informando de la concesión de un asiento de negros en el Río de la Plata a favor de Baltasar Coymans y pide recomendaciones personales para que su hijo Pedro sea empleado en ese negocio. Menciona también a Gaspar de Rebolledo, Juan Pimentel como Gobernador de Buenos Aires y a [Carlos José Gutiérrez de los Ríos Roha, VI] Conde de Fernán-Núñez. Antwerp, 1685-04-17.
  - July 1686: The Imperial Cortes, Council of Castile started an investigation into the legitimacy of the Asiento. The asiento with Coymans is annulled.
  - October 1686: The Dutch refused to accept the "Junta de Asiento de Negros", a commission of dubious authority.
  - There was a risk of war between France, Britain and Spain, resulting in the Grand Alliance; the Dutch feared Jamaica was becoming more important than Curaçao.
  - The Dutch West India Company paid high dividends, 10%.
- 1687–1688: Jan Carçau, or Juan Carcán a former assistant of Balthasar Coymans, takes over the asiento.
  - March 1688: Jan Carçao is put in prison in Cádiz, accused of fraud. In June 1688 the commission delivered an opinion the Dutch must recognize the Juntas authority before discussions could proceed.
  - In August 1688 the shares of the Dutch East and West India company collapsed in a crash on the Amsterdam stock market. Since the Glorious Revolution the catholic oriented James II of England exiled in France.
- 1688 – October 1691: Nicolás Porcio.
- 1692–1695: Bernardo Francisco Marín de Guzmán.
  - 1695–1701: Spain returned to the Portuguese; Manuel Ferreira de Carvalho representing the Cacheu and Cape Verde Company.
  - By 1695, the French Navy had declined to the point that it could no longer face the English and Dutch in an open sea battle and therefore had switched to privateering – Guerre de course.
  - 1695–1696 The Royal Africa Company suffered heavy losses, and lost its monopoly after the Trade with Africa Act 1697.
  - By 1696, it was clear Charles II of Spain would die childless, and his potential heirs included Louis XIV and Emperor Leopold in Vienna.
  - May 1697 the French raided Cartagena and plundered the city. Jean du Casse, who gave his support only reluctantly, as he preferred an attack on Portobelo, where most of the silver and Spanish dollars came from. All the countries needed to boost the economy at the end of the Nine Years War. In September 1697, France signed Treaties of Peace with Spain and England, and a Treaty of Peace and Commerce with the Dutch Republic (Peace of Ryswick). In the Caribbean, France received the Spanish islands of Tortuga and Saint-Domingue.
- 1699–1703 Manuel Belmonte cooperated with Luis and Simon Rodriques de Souza from the Portuguese West India Company.
  - In 1700 a grandson of Louis XIV ascended the Spanish throne as King Philip V of Spain.
  - In 1702 the War of the Spanish Succession began: the Grand Alliance (Kingdom of England, Dutch Republic and Holy Roman Empire) declared war on France and Spain. However, the Royal Navy's main effort was not off the Spanish Main, but off the Spanish coasts in Europe (Battle of Cádiz). Spanish naval losses in the Battle of Vigo Bay meant a total dependence on the French navy to keep up communications with the Americas. Spain was reliant on French ships, not only for slaves, even for its bullion fleet. Because of commercial competition paying the French and Spanish for the Asiento was a prominent issue during the Spanish War of Succession.
  - The Methuen Treaty with the Dutch envoy Francesco Belmonte as one of the negotiators regulated the establishment of trade relations between England, Portugal and perhaps Brazil? The Portuguese who had trouble letting go of their Asiento rights ... were understood as a French privilege and indeed a marker of the superior status of the French abroad.

=== French: 1701–1713 ===
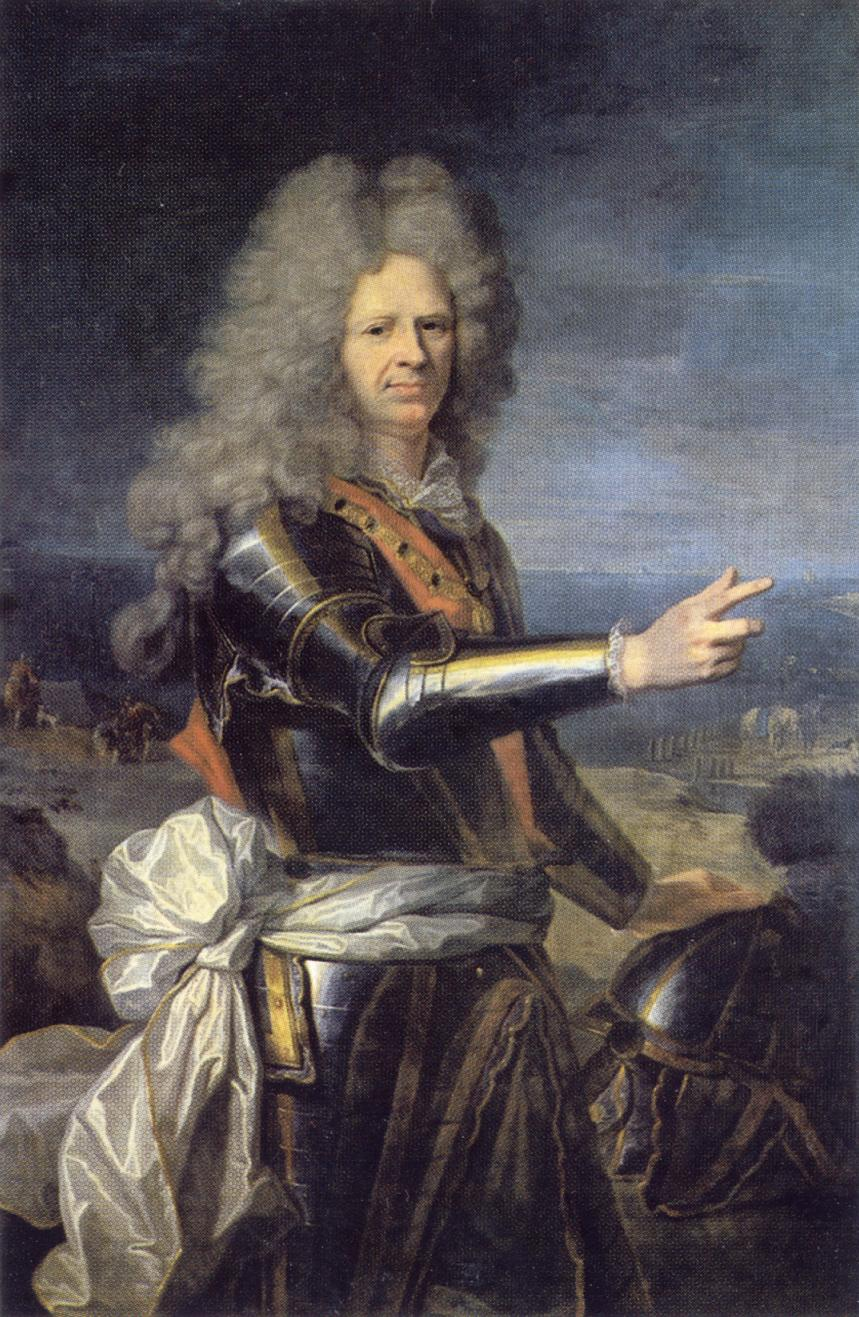
Jean-Baptiste du Casse, 1700

- 1701–1713: Governor Jean-Baptiste du Casse in name of the Compagnie de Guinée et de l'Assiente des Royaume de la France, founded in 1684. Company of Guinée concentrated on the slave trade for Guinée and Saint-Domingue; returning with sugar and all the other goods to Nantes. In 1701, the French king granted the Guinée Company the Spanish Asiento and the company reorganised. Unlike any other chartered company before it, it included both the Spanish king and the French king as shareholders, for one-quarter of the total capital each, which amounted to 100,000 livres. The Asiento did not concern French Caribbean but Spanish America.
- In 1706, the English planters on Jamaica asked the Guinée company to supply them with slaves, but it was refused.
- December 2, 1711, Jacques Cassard obtained from the French king the command of a squadron of eight vessels and embarked on an expedition during which he plundered the Portuguese colony Cape Verde. He seized in particular fort Praia on Santiago, Cape Verde, the storehouse of the commerce. Then he set off to Montserrat and Antigua in the Caribbean before heading to the possessions of the Dutch. On 10 October 1712, Cassard attacked Suriname and Berbice, where demanded an amount of 300,000 guilders, which was paid in bills of exchange, slaves and goods. The negotiations with Suriname started, and on 27 October Cassard left with ƒ 747,350 (€8.1 million in 2018). Cassard returned to Martinique and set sail towards Sint Eustatius. Curaçao was occupied by Cassard from February 18 to 27, 1713, more substantial and richer than the previous ones, but it's also much better defended.
- The king abolished the Asiento Company's monopoly in 1713 and opened the trade south of the Sierra Leone River to French private traders from five specific port towns: Nantes, Bordeaux, La Rochelle, Le Havre and Saint-Malo. They paid a tax to the king for each enslaved African transported to the French West Indies upon their return to France.

=== British: 1713–1750 ===
After the introduction of the Trade with Africa Act 1697 the Royal African Company lost its monopoly and in 1708 it was insolvent.

- 1 May 1713 – May 1743: South Sea Company received the Asiento for thirty years, The English contractor was required to advance 200,000 pesos (£45,000) to Philip for their share in the trade, to be paid in two equal installments, the first two months after the contract was signed, the second two months after the first. In addition, the company was allowed to send one ship of 500 tons annually to Portobello to engage in normal trade to avoid contraband.

The 1713 Peace of Utrecht granted Britain an asiento de negros lasting 30 years to supply the Spanish colonies with 144,000 at 4,800 slaves per year. Britain was permitted to open offices in Buenos Aires, Caracas, Cartagena, Havana, Panama, Portobello and Vera Cruz. An extra-legal clause was added; one ship of no more than 500 tons could be sent to one of these places each year (the Navío de Permiso) with general trade goods. (Two ships were in addition to the annual ships, but were not part of the asiento contract.) One-quarter of the profits were to be reserved for the King of Spain. The Asiento was granted in the name of Queen Anne and then contracted to the company.

It was provided that the same reporting procedure might take place at subsequent five-year intervals. At the end of the contract the Assentistas were permitted three years to remove their effects from the Indies, adjust their accounts and ‘‘make up a balance of the whole”.

By July the South Sea Company had arranged contracts with the Royal African Company to supply the necessary African slaves to Jamaica. Ten pounds was paid for a slave aged over 16, £8 for one under 16 but over 10. Two-thirds were to be male, and 90% adult. The company trans-shipped 1,230 slaves from Jamaica to America in the first year, plus any that might have been added (against standing instructions) by the ship's captains on their own behalf. On arrival of the first cargoes, the local authorities refused to accept the asiento, which had still not been officially confirmed there by the Spanish authorities. The slaves were eventually sold at a loss in the West Indies.

In 1714 the government announced that a quarter of profits would be reserved for Queen Anne and a further 7.5% for a financial advisor, Manuel Manasses Gilligan, an English colonist, who operated from the (neutral) Danish West Indies. Some Company board members refused to accept the contract on these terms, and the government was obliged to reverse its decision. Despite these setbacks, the company continued, having raised 200,000 pesos (maybe ducats or Spanish escudos? to finance the operations. Anne had secretly negotiated with France to get its approval regarding the asiento. She boasted to Parliament of her success in taking the asiento away from France and London celebrated her economic coup.

According to Nelson (1945, p. 55) the SSC’s smuggling ‘‘threatened to destroy the entire commercial framework of the Spanish Empire”. Contraband trade became a constant concern of the Spanish who invested heavily in naval protection. While this effectively diminished the profitability of the Asiento, the Spanish enhanced monitoring activity succeeded in detecting an increasing amount of smuggling (Bernal, 2001).

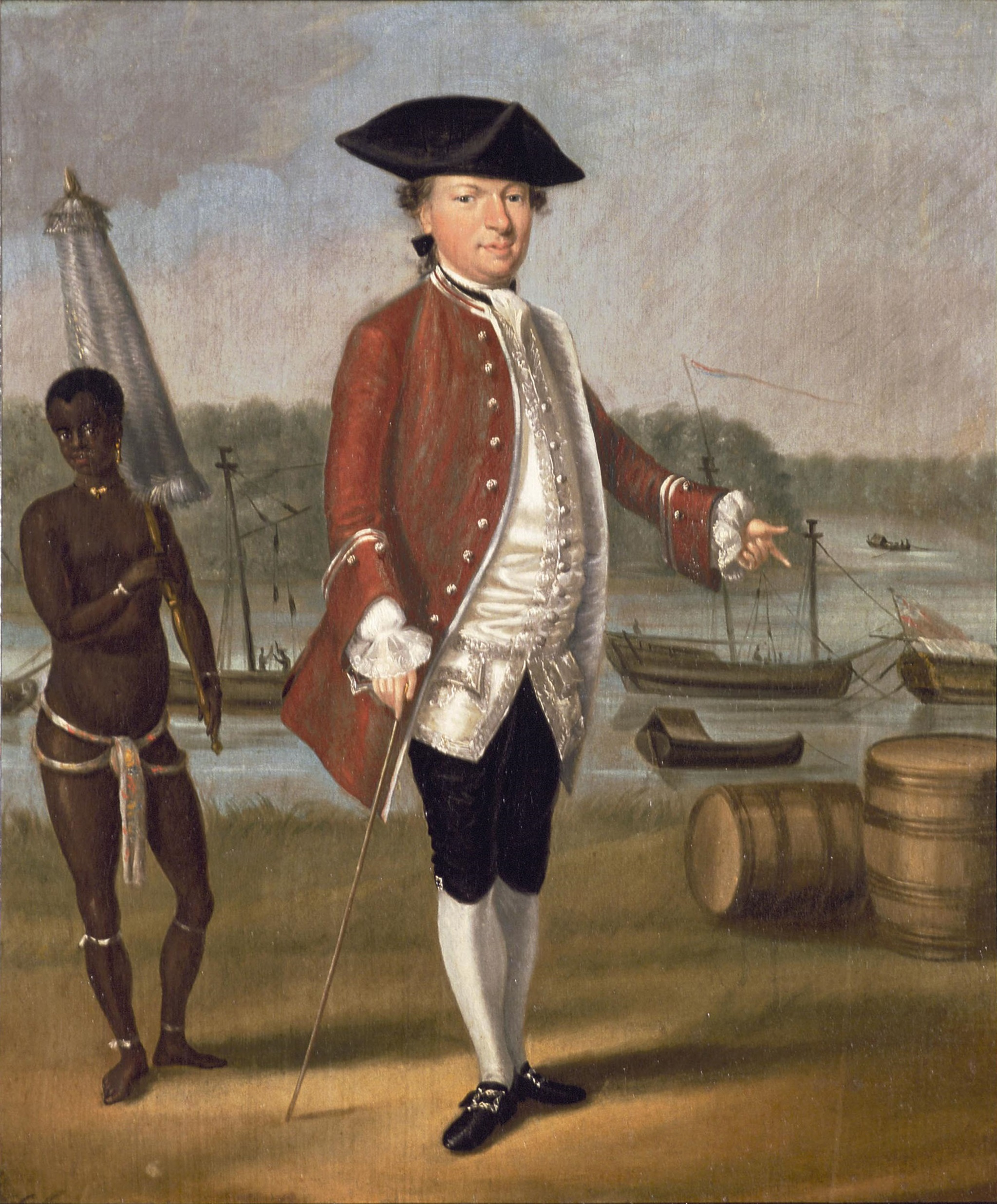
Dutch merchant with a Slave. Rijksmuseum Amsterdam

In 1714 2,680 slaves were carried, and for 1716–17, 13,000 more, but the trade continued to be unprofitable. As the French previously discovered, high costs meant the real profits from the slave trade asiento were in smuggling contraband goods, which evaded import duties and deprived the authorities of much-needed revenue. An import duty of 33 pieces of eight was charged on each slave (although for this purpose two children were counted as one adult slave). In 1718 a declaration of war between England and Spain halted operations under the Asiento until 1721. The company's assets in South America were seized, at a cost claimed by the company to be £300,000. Any prospect of profit from trade, for which the company had purchased ships and had been planning its next ventures, disappeared. Similar conflicts interrupted the contract from 1727 to 1729 and 1739 to 1748. Increasing knowledge of illicit trading by the SSC resulted in the Spanish tightening on-site monitoring in the Americas during the 1730s. The Spanish then proceeded to seek recompense for clandestine trade carried on by the SSC and others under the veil of the supply of Negroes and the annual ship. Thus a key feature of the depredations crisis was the ongoing failure by the SSC to account and report transparently. Spain having raised objections to the asiento clauses, the Treaty of Aix-la-Chapelle was supplemented by the Treaty of Madrid (5 October 1750). The matter of the asiento was not even mentioned in the treaty, as it had lessened in importance to both nations, although both parties had agreed to resolve outstanding concerns at a "proper time and place". The issue was finally settled in 1750 when Britain agreed to renounce its claim to the asiento in exchange for a payment of £100,000 and British trade with Spanish America under favourable conditions. In 1752 the African Company of Merchants was founded.

It has been estimated that the company transported over 34,000 slaves with deaths comparable to its competitors, which was taken as competence in this area of work at the time. Meanwhile, it became a business for privately owned enterprises; the Dutch West India Company began to outsource the slave trade since 1730s? In 1740 a Havana company paid Spain for the Asiento to import slaves to Cuba.

- There was no asiento during the Austrian War of Succession (1740–1748).
- 1748–1750: Spain renewed the asiento with Britain for four years, but it ended with the Treaty of Madrid. The Spanish authorities "restore[d] the slave trade to the sphere of internal law from which it should never have left". By the middle of the 18th century, British Jamaica and French Saint-Domingue had become the largest slave societies of the region. As of 1778, the French were importing approximately 13,000 Africans for enslavement to the French West Indies each year.
- In 1762, the British imported more than 10,000 African slaves to Havana. They used it as a base to supply the Caribbean and the lower Thirteen Colonies. In response to the short British occupation of Havana (1762–1763), when the British disembarked 3,500 slaves in ten months, the Spanish crown made determined efforts to revive its own transatlantic slave-trading role. Spain theoretically allowed no foreigners to share directly in the colonial trade, the effect of which was to starve the colonies of necessary imports and to encourage smuggling.

=== Spanish: 1765–1779 ===
The asiento was given to a group of Basques from 1765 to 1779.

- 1765–1772: Miguel de Uriarte in the name of Aguirre, Aristegui, J.M. Enrile y Compañía, or Compañía Gaditana.
- 1773–1779: Aguirre, Aristegui y Compañía, or Compañía Gaditana.
- A severe credit crisis in 1772 forced the Cliffords and several other bankers and their firms into bankruptcy. In 1773 many planters in Surinam and the Caribbean experienced financial difficulties and the Dutch slave trade dropped.
- A significant moral victory was achieved when the British Chief Justice, Lord Mansfield, ruled in 1772 that slavery was illegal in Britain (Somersett's Case), thereby freeing about 15,000 slaves who had accompanied their masters there—and abruptly terminating the practice of black slaves ostentatiously escorting their masters about the kingdom.
- During the Fourth Anglo-Dutch War the English seized a few Dutch slave ships, such as the Zong. An attempt to capture the Dutch castle at Elmina on Africa's Gold Coast (modern Ghana) failed in 1782. While many Dutch territories in the West Indies were taken by the British, some, like Curaçao, were not attacked due to their defensive strength.
- In 1784, the Spanish crown contracted with a large Liverpool firm to bring slaves to Venezuela and Cuba from 1786 to 1789.
- On the 4th of February 1794 a decree was passed by the National Legislative Assembly, making France the first European country to officially outlaw slavery in all its colonies. However this was only implemented in Saint-Domingue, Guadeloupe and Guiana.
- In March 1795 the Batavian Republic did not accept all citizens on equal footing (bookkeeping);
- The Law of 20 May 1802 reinstated slavery in the French Empire.

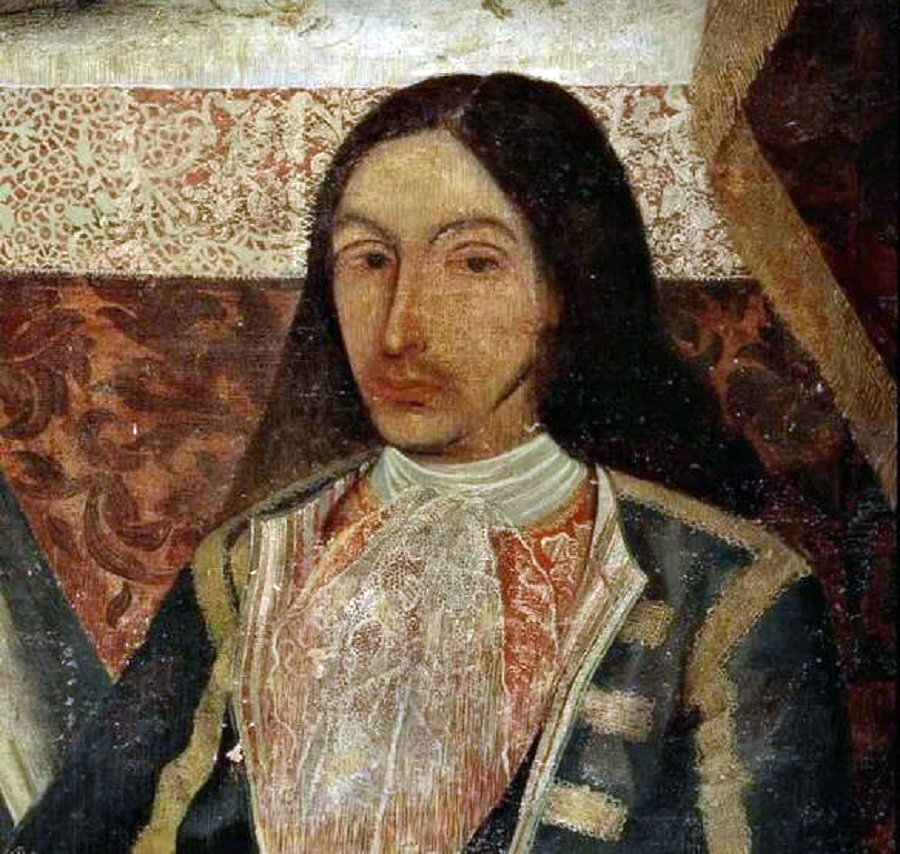
The Spanish Amaro Pargo, who was one of the most famous privateers of the Golden Age of Piracy, participated in the African slave trade in Hispanic America

Spain's connection to the slave trade with Africa was minor, smaller than that of the Portuguese, the English, the French and Dutch, estimated at only 185 voyages and 276,885 slaves who embarked from 1500 to 1800. This compares to almost 25,000 voyages and over 7,331,831 slaves who were transported by those nations from 1500 to 1800. Of the total number of slaves, nearly half went to the Caribbean islands and the Guianas, almost 40 per cent to Brazil, and some 6 per cent to mainland Spanish America. Most of them arrived between 1601 and 1625, but the numbers dropped to their lowest levels between 1676 and 1700. Surprisingly, less than five per cent of the slaves went to North America. These figures may require revision as the authors of "Atlantic History and the Slave Trade to Spanish America" suggest that half went to Brazil and a quarter to the Caribbean.

The Spanish privateer and merchant Amaro Pargo (1678-1747) managed to transport slaves to the Caribbean, although, it is estimated, to a lesser extent than other captains and figures of the time dedicated to this activity. In 1710, the privateer was involved in a complaint by the priest Alonso García Ximénez, who accused him of freeing an African slave named Sebastián, who was transported to Venezuela on one of Amaro's ships. The aforementioned Alonso García granted a power of attorney on July 18, 1715 to Teodoro Garcés de Salazar so that he could demand his return in Caracas. Despite this fact, Amaro Pargo himself also owned slaves in his domestic service. Fellow Spanish privateer Miguel Enríquez, himself the son of a former slavewoman, also became enormously influential in the slavery business at several stages.

== See also ==
- Chartered companies
- Spanish Empire
