= History of the Jews in Peru =

Peruvian Jews Judíos del Perú
- The location of Peru in South America

Total population
- 1,900 (Note: The declining community is mostly based in Lima and Iquitos. The latter's resident community is numbered at 50 people, while the rest (80% of the community) left the country and established itself in Israel during the early 21st century. The community in Cuzco is numbered at 200 to 300 people.)

Regions with significant populations
- Lima metropolitan area, Cuzco, Iquitos

Languages
- Spanish, Hebrew, Yiddish, Ladino

Religion
- Judaism

Related ethnic groups
- Chilean Jews, Bolivian Jews

The history of the Jews in Peru dates back to the country's Spanish period with the arrival of migration flows of Sephardic Jews from Europe, the Near East and Northern Africa. This small community virtually disappeared as a result of the Inquisition, and was only revived by a number of migratory waves that took place during the 19th-century and the early to mid-20th century, with a number of Sephardic and Ashkenazi Jews arriving to northeastern Iquitos due to the Amazon rubber boom, as well as the country's capital, Lima, through neighbouring Callao, where they also settled due to World War II.

The small community in and around Iquitos is now known as the Amazonian Jews, most of which have since established themselves in Israel since the late 20th century. In Lima, the community is based in the upper-class districts of San Isidro and Miraflores, where a number of synagogues are also located. A synagogue also services a small community in the southern city of Cuzco.

== History ==
=== Spanish period ===
Some Jewish conversos arrived at the time of the Spanish conquest of the Inca Empire. Then, only Christians were allowed to take part in expeditions to the New World. At first, they had lived without restrictions because the Inquisition was not active in Peru at the beginning of the Viceroyalty. According to the Jewish Virtual Library, the original attraction for Jews to come to Peru was the mineral potential. Many Jews had come to Portugal disregarding the immigration restrictions placed at the time. This action would then be used in trials against some of these crypto-Jews who faced the tribunal of Lima, further adding on a penalty to their actions.

The Holy Office of the Inquisition established an office in Lima January 9, 1570, to control the Christian population of the Viceroyalty and to identify non-Catholics, such as Jews, Lutherans, and Muslims. (Note: The Jewish Virtual Library argues however, that towards the early 17th century, the tribunal had started to focus on crypto-Jews who were rich and wealthy, as the holy office were able to confiscate their properties after the condemnation.) Consequently, 'New Christians' began to be persecuted, and, in some cases, executed. Descendants of Jews were sometimes called "marranos" ("pigs"), converts ("conversos"), and "Cristianos nuevos" (New Christians) even if they had been reared as Catholics from birth. Crypto-Jews, self-proclaimed Catholics who would secretly adhere to Judaism, were the initial targets of the tribunal and punished, tortured or killed if caught. Some avoided the tribunals by immigrating out of Spanish territories, such as Peru.

To escape persecution, the conversos settled mainly in the northern highlands and northern high jungle. They intermarried with natives and non-Jewish Europeans (mainly Spanish and Portuguese people) in some areas, assimilating to the local people: in Cajamarca, the northern highlands of Piura (Ayabaca and Huancabamba), among others, due to cultural and ethnic contact with people of the southern highlands of Ecuador. Their mixed-race descendants, known today as the Amazonian Jews, were reared with syncretic Catholic, Jewish, European, and Andean rituals and beliefs.

According to historian Ana Schaposchnik, the stages of the trial followed "a sequence of: denunciation, deposition, imprisonment, hearings, accusation, torture, confession, defense, publication, sentence, and the Auto." The Auto de Fe were occasional public ceremony of punishments made through the inquisition. The punishments included being burnt to a stake, whipping, and being exiled. The trial had started with the accused being convicted of a crime.

The tribunal had often used their connections of viceroyalty to gain information about the New Christians, about their past actions in other Spanish colonies. This was the case of Joan Vincente, who was a Portuguese New Christian who had previously been renounced but was put into trial in 1603. His previous actions in Brazil, Potosi, and Tucumán had all been shared by the viceroyalties in those regions. The genealogies of the crypto-Jews were accessible through this connection, making it possible to accurately see who were New Christians. Since the actions of the accused was often not documented, the accused New Christians in court could not prove their statements, while the viceroyalty could obtain all the documentation needed in the trial.

In most trials, the accused New Christians would not give up names of others who were also known to be Judaizing, until they were tortured. After days or weeks of torture, most crypto-Jews gave up other crypto-Jews up to the tribunal. For example, Mencia de Luna, had said during the trial, "tell notaries of the tribunal to write whatever they wanted in her declaration, so that her suffering would come to an end". Schaposchnik also states that from recorded accounts from 1635 to 1639 of new Christian Portuguese, 110 people were arrested due to their alleged connection to the Great Jewish Conspiracy, with many having to reconcile their faith to Christianity along with being exiled and facing confiscation of property. He states, "As a result of the Auto General de Fe, the community of Portuguese New Christians in Lima were decimated." It is said that up 11 people were burned at a stake as they did not confess to committing any Judaic practices.

According to anthropologist Irene Silverblatt, though it is not clear that those who were persecuted under the inquisition were practicing Judaism, most of the New Christians in Lima were considered "tainted" even after being baptised. Many New Christians during this time were seen to be inferior to Old Christians being banned from certain professions, entering universities and public offices. The inquisition had those who had been called, to confess to their sins and share information on others who had practiced Judaism in Lima.

A notable figure of those prosecuted in Lima included Manuel Bautista Pérez, an individual who was considered as "one of the world’s most powerful men in international commerce". Perez had been arrested once in 1620, when a broad sheet had been found which claimed that Perez was one of the premier teachers of Judaism in Lima. The witnesses and inquisitors considered Perez to be an 'oracle' due to his vast knowledge and wealth. Though Peru fought to the best of his abilities during the hearings, the overwhelming evidence against had mounted up. The inquisitors had faced some difficulty in going through with the trial, as Perez was a part of the viceroyalty's high society, with many clergy and high figures testifying for his innocence. Some of the evidence submitted in the trial included many New Christians appearing as witnesses calling him the Great Captain of Jews in Peru, along with his brother-in-law denouncing him.

Another notable crypto-Jew that had been in the tribunal was Antonio Cordero, who was a clerk from Seville. He had been originally denounced in 1634 with weak evidence, such as abstaining from work on Saturdays and not eating pork. The tribunal decided to conduct a secret arrest on Cordero, so there would be no one suspecting the tribunal's involvement. They gave him no sequestration, and he confessed that he was a crypto-Jew. After they had tortured Cordero, he gave up the name of his employer and two others, which then gave up the name of more crypto-Jews in Lima. This eventually led to seventeen arrests being made, with many notable merchants being brought to the Tribunal as crypto-Jews. According to Henry Charles Lea, this then led to many frightened Portuguese to try to flee Lima.

=== 19th century ===
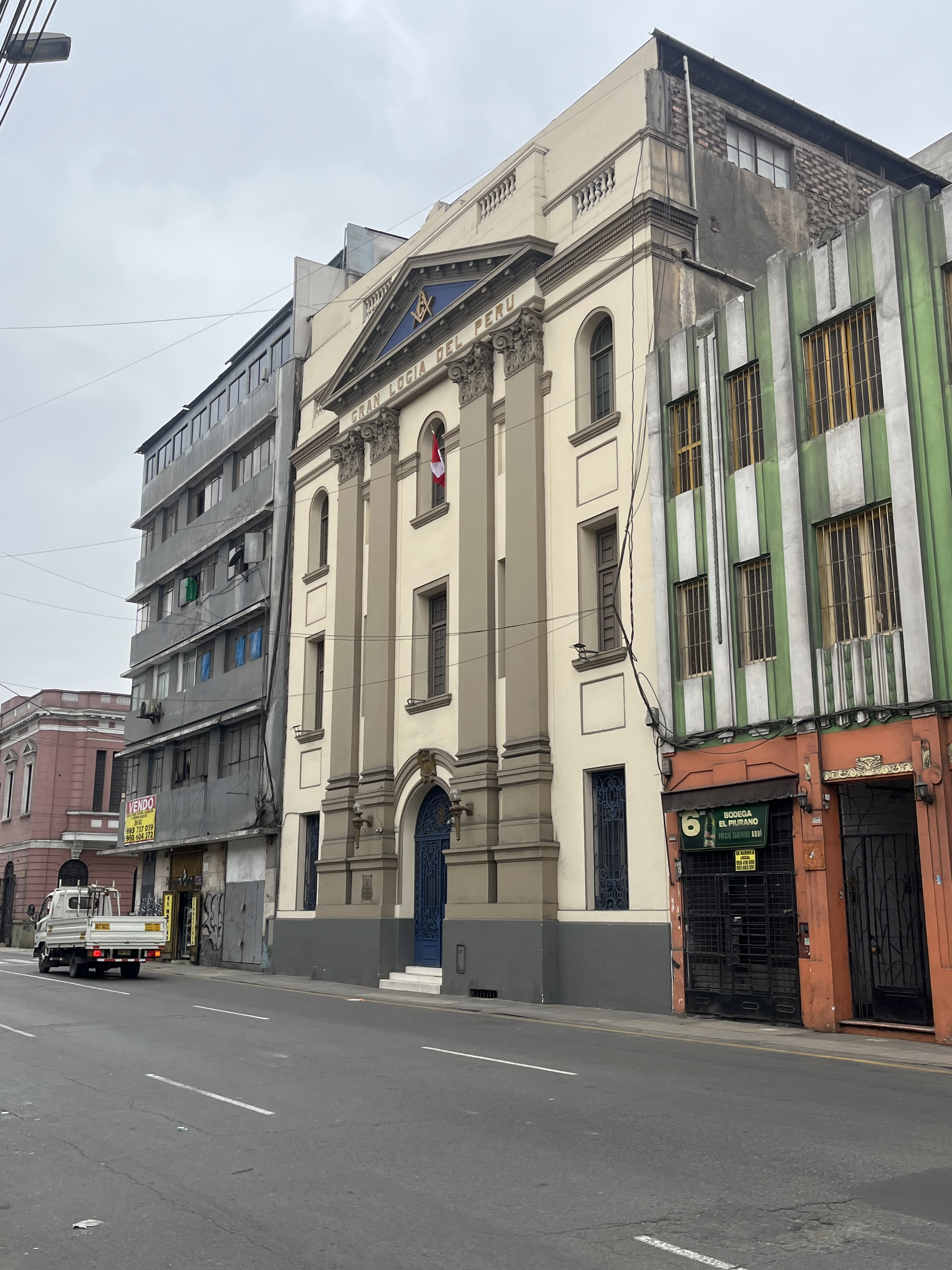
Masonic lodges like this one, built in 1882, were rented for the High Holy Days.

The first Jews to arrive to an independent Peru were first recorded in 1855, when the frigate Nicoline arrived from Hamburg. Two of the ship's passengers were Louis Gosdinski and Johana Rosemberg, along with their sister Minna, the latter two originally from Bromberg. The couple's son, Adolfo, was probably the first Jew to be registered as such; he would later serve in the War of the Pacific on the Peruvian side. The first Jewish-owned businesses were established in 1852. Immigration increased in the 1860s, with communities from France, Germany, England and Russia moving into the country. One such family was the Calmann family, who acquired silver mines in Copiapó and Arica. By 1870, there were about 120-300 Jews in Peru. In 1885, the first Torah scroll was brought into the country, with ceremonies held in Masonic lodges rented for the High Holy Days.

During the last decades of the 19th century, many Sephardi Jews from Morocco emigrated to Loreto as traders and trappers, working with the natives. The first was Alfredo Coblentz, a German Jew who arrived in 1880 at the port of Yurimaguas. Starting in 1885, the Amazon rubber boom attracted even greater numbers of Sephardi Jews from North Africa as well as Europeans. (Note: Rita Saccal, former director the library of the Seminario Rabínico Latinoamericano, writes that "In 1885, the first year of the Amazon rubber boom, the Pinto brothers — Moises, Abraham and Jaime — immigrated to Iquitos, such as other 150 Sephardi Jews, mainly from Morocco, Gibraltar, Malta, Alsace, and Manchester, named Bohabot, Bendayán, Edery, Toledano, Assayac, Cohen, Levi, Nahmías, Sarfati, Azulay. They spoke Ladino, Hebrew and Haketia.") Many settled in Iquitos, which was the Peruvian centre for the export of rubber along the Amazon River. They created the second organised Jewish community in Peru after Lima, founding a Jewish cemetery and synagogue. After the boom fizzled due to competition from Southeast Asia, many European and North African Jews left Iquitos. Those who remained over generations have eventually married native women; their mixed-race or mestizo descendants grew up in the local culture, a mixture of Jewish and Amazonian influences and faiths, and are now known as the Amazonian Jews. This community became linked with that of the Brazilian city of Belém.

In 1870, the Sociedad Hebrea de Beneficencia was formally founded by Jews wishing to organise the proper burial rituals and financial compensation for the families of ten Jews who died of yellow fever in 1868, who were buried in the British Cemetery of Callao. A provisional directory had been established in Abril 1869 under the leadership of Jacobo Herzberg and Miguel Badt, but the society—under the presidency of Natazzius Hurwitz, who was accompanied by Paul Ascher and Jacobo Brillman—was only officially recognised on July 1, 1873. In March 1875, the first stone of the Campo Santo Israelita de Baquíjano was placed in a terrain acquired from U.S. businessman Henry Meiggs in what was then Baquíjano farm, located at La Legua Valley. The first Jewish woman to be buried there was Mina Rosemberg. Prior to this, burials had been a persistent issue, as was the case of the Hahn family from Breslau, who could only bury a member in the municipal cemetery following a large donation.

In Lima, a small number of Ashkenazi Jews left Europe and the United States for Peru, working in banking, commerce and infrastructure, among other lines of work. In 1875, the number of Jews in Lima was 300, of which 55% were from Germany, 15% from France, 10% from England, 10% from Russia and 20% from other backgrounds. A notable resident at the time was Auguste Dreyfus, who had signed a contract with the Peruvian government to acquire 2 million tons of guano. The War of the Pacific, which took place from 1879 until 1883, also interrupted any immigration during this period. By 1890, it was estimated that around 200 Jews lived in the country.

=== 20th century ===
From around 1910 to 1915, a wave of Sephardic Jews from the Ottoman Empire, as well as Greece, Morocco, and Egypt migrated to Peru. Around 1912, some Ashkenazi Jews, mostly from Western and Eastern Slavic areas and from Hungary, also made the same voyage, chiefly to the capital Lima. In 1909, the Charity of Iquitos was established by businessman Victor Israel, who later served as the city's mayor.

The Jewish–German Sociedad de Beneficencia Israelita saw the separation of the Sephardic Sociedad de Beneficencia Israelita Sefaradí on November 9, 1920, which was officially registered on November 24, 1925, inaugurating its premises in Santa Beatriz on September 17, 1933. Meanwhile, the Ashkenazi Unión Israelita del Perú was founded at the Chirimoyo neighbourhood on June 11, 1923, which was officially registered on November 16, 1929. The Organización Sionista del Perú, a Zionist organisation that sought to reunite all of Peruvian Jewry, was established in 1925.

Until the 1930s, there were no synagogues in Peru due to the community only celebrating the High Holy Days. During this decade, the Unión Israelita del Perú—the Ashkenazi congregation of Peru established in 1923—hired Abraham Moshe Brener, a Polish Rabbi, to perform Jewish rituals in the country. (Note: Brener's work was controversial due to it not strictly following Jewish law, although later authorities recognised his work, seeing this flexibility as having avoided the exclusion of many Jews from the community.) Brener arrived in Lima in 1934 and oversaw the rituals of all Jewish denominations up until around 1950, when the Sephardic congregation—established in 1928—hired Abraham Shalem. In 1957, another rabbi, Lothar Goldstein, was hired by the German Israelite Society.

During the 1930s, the community saw itself negatively affected with the establishment of the Revolutionary Union, a fascist political party founded by Luis Miguel Sánchez Cerro, who served as president from 1931 until his assassination in 1933. Luis A. Flores assumed the party's leadership following his death, leading it towards a more radical shift in ideology. This anti-Jewish sentiment led to attacks on some Jewish-owned businesses in Lima. The Comité de Protección a los Inmigrantes Israelitas al Perú was created in 1935 by Peruvian Jews to obtain visas and to find employment for Jewish arrivals to the country. It was led by Leopoldo Weil.

During World War II, the Consul-General of Peru in Geneva, José Maria Barreto, secretly issued passports to a group of Jews which included prisoners at the concentration camp in the (German-occupied) French city of Vittel. The Peruvian government at the time had forbidden its diplomatic missions to issue visas to Jewish refugees, an order that Barreto ignored. In 2014, he was posthumously recognised as Righteous Among the Nations. Another similar figure was that of Madeleine Truel, a member of the French resistance. According to Jewish historian León Trahtemberg, some 500 German-speaking Jews, 500 Sephardic Jews, and 1,500 Eastern European Jews arrived to Peru in the 1930s. During the war, some 500 managed to enter the country through the payment of huge sums of money for visas. The World Jewish Congress puts the number at 650 Jews.

For logistical reasons, and in response to growing anti-Jewish sentiment, the Colectividad Israelita del Perú was established on February 4, 1942, presided by Max Heller, Jacobo Franco and Leopoldo Weil. It was registered the Asociación de Sociedades Israelitas del Perú on June 20, 1944, a name that remained until 1975, when it was renamed the Asociación Judía del Perú (AJP). A committee to build a Jewish school was formed in March 1945 and headed by Israel Brodsky, inaugurating the León Pinelo School on April 24, 1946, then located at 1241 General Varela street and whose first honorary director was writer Manuel Beltroy. The school later moved to 610 Los Manzanos (then Maimónides) street in 1954. Another "Pro-Hebrew Palestine" committee was established on June 27, 1945, headed by José Gálvez Barrenechea and composed of people such as Luis E. Valcárcel and César Miró, among others.

The Unión Israelita saw the separation of three Orthodox groups who opposed Brener and opened synagogues of their own. Knesset Israel separated in 1942, led by Leib Fishman; and Adat Israel did the same in 1953, led by Abraham Shapiro Klein and reuniting to pray at one room of a house in Bolivia Avenue that belonged to member Jaime Portnoi. On the High Holidays of the same year (July 29), they inaugurated a synagogue of their own at 542 Iquique street in Chacra Colorada (a neighbourhood of Breña, one of the city's districts), commonly known as the Mandel Synagogue after the family of the same name affiliated to the group. The last group to separate was Sharón. The congregation eventually unified again, starting with the dissolution and reincorporation of the members of Knesset Israel and Adat Israel, followed by a process of integration between Sharón and the Unión Israelita that started in 1987, when the inventory of the synagogue of the Unión Israelita located at Brasil Avenue was moved to the former's location in San Isidro.

In the early 1950s, the Jewish community in Lima and Callao was distributed as follows:

Location	Description
Bellavista	Location of the Jewish Cemetery founded by the German Jews in 1875.
Breña	Two synagogues belonging to the Ashkenazi community were located at Iquique and Malvas streets, both located in Chacra Colorada.
Jesús María	At the time, the León Pinelo School was located at the intersection of Húsares de Junín street and the 15th block of Brasil Avenue, also the site of a synagogue built in 1958 and active until 1987. It had moved from its original location at Carlos Arrieta in Breña, and later moved to its current location in San Isidro.
Lima	The Bodega Universal, a Jewish pastry shop owned by Isaac Goldemberg and José Schneider, was located at the intersection of Camaná and Huancavelica streets, also serving as a meeting place for local Jews.
Lince	A synagogue belonging to the Sephardic community was located at the intersection of Enrique Villar (No. 581) and Carlos Arrieta streets prior to moving to San Isidro during the early 2000s.

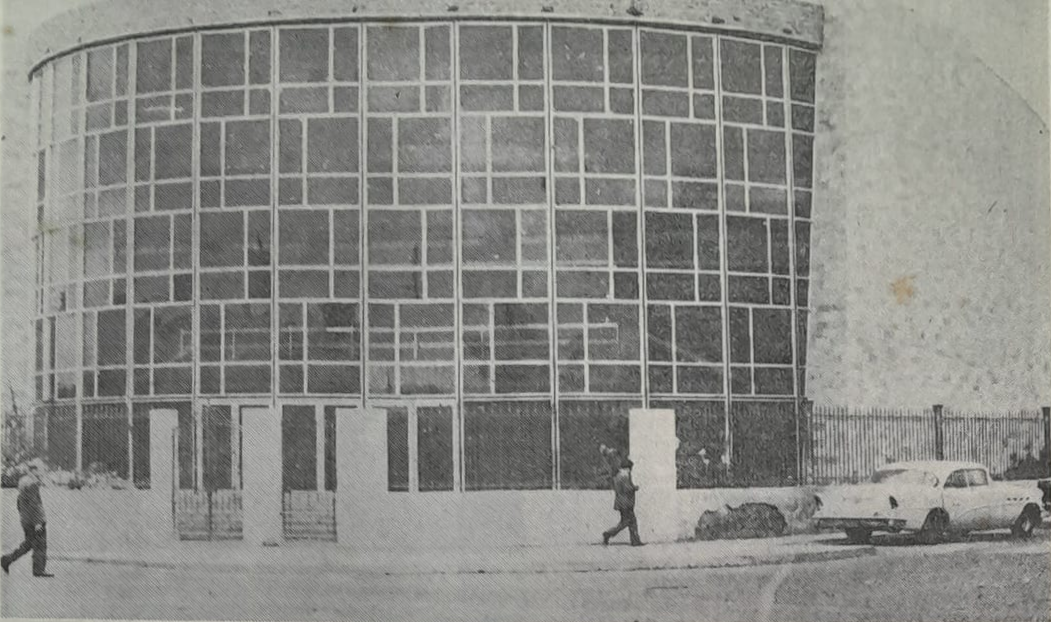
This synagogue in Jesús María, built in 1958, functioned until 1987 and was later demolished to build a supermarket.

Starting in 1950, the Jews in Peru started their involvement in the country's economy and a number of white-collar workspaces. A strong interest in Zionism also took over the community, with two youth organisations being formed to prepare young Jews to emigrate to Israel: Betar (located at the synagogue in Iquique street) and Hanoar Hatzioní (located at León Pinelo School). Marcos Roitman, an ardent Jewish-Peruvian Zionist, was nominated as honorary consul of Israel in 1951, inaugurating the consulate at Colmena Avenue in late 1953. Relations between both countries were then elevated to legation level in 1956 and to embassy level in 1958, with Tuvia Arazi serving as Israel's first ambassador. Prior to the establishment of relations, Peru had voted in favour of the 1947 United Nations Partition Plan for Palestine.

Massive immigration to Israel began after the Six Day War in 1967, similar to other countries in Latin America. The community had experienced constant growth in the 1960s, but the country's political climate and instability led to a gradual decline in the following decades. The remaining community nevertheless remained active; in 1976, the country hosted the third Pan-American Maccabiah Games, and the 1980s saw the establishment of Lima's Chabad, headed by carioca rabbi Uri Blumenfeld. The community reached its peak around 1970, with some 5,200 members.

During a trip to Iquitos in 1948 and 1949, the Argentine-Israeli geologist Alfredo Rosensweig had noted that the Amazonian Jews were "almost a hidden community" due to their geographical separation from Lima and the city's inaccessibility by road. At the time that Rosensweig visited, the community did not have a Jewish school, a rabbi, or a synagogue. Most Amazonian Jews in Iquitos are of Christian origin, and consider themselves to be a mix between Christians and Jews. It's believed that was due to the fact that most immigrant Jews who had come to Iquitos in the 19th century were single men, who then married the Christian women of Iquitos. In the 1950s and 60s, the Jews of Iquitos had almost disappeared due to the mass emigration to Lima. The community of Iquitos Jews had not been recognised by the rest of Peru until the 1980s, when Rabbi Guillermo Bronstein, who was then the chief rabbi of the Asociación Judía del Perú in Lima, was contacted by the Iquitos Jews and visited the community in 1991, subsequently sending resources such as prayer books and other Jewish texts. In 1991, the Sociedad Israelita de Iquitos was established.

In 1990, 70 people from Cajamarca who claimed descent from the Ten Lost Tribes (and thus converted to Judaism) moved to Israel. Another group followed in 1991, composed of 32 people. On the same year, an Indigenous woman married a soon-to-be Israeli rabbi.

In 1994, the community was numbered at 3,000 people. That same year, Jewish politician Efraín Goldenberg was sworn in as Prime Minister of Peru.

=== 21st century ===
In 2005, Guillermo Bronstein, rabbi of Miraflores' synagogue, claimed that an increase in antisemitic attacks threatened the community, numbered at 3,000 at the time. In 2016, Peru elected Pedro Pablo Kuczynski, a politician of Jewish descent, as president of the country. Under his presidency, Israel opened a trade office in August of that same year.

As of 2023, there are about 1,900 Jews in Peru, with only three organised communities: Lima, Iquitos and Cuzco. The community is in decline, having been numbered at 3,000 years prior and 5,000 in the 1970s, but has nevertheless contributed to the country's economy and politics. The majority in Lima (and the country) are Ashkenazi Jews (whose community was founded in 1934), while others are Sephardic Jews (whose community was founded in 1933). Both communities proclaim themselves to be Orthodox.

As of 2025, four synagogues represent the Jewish community in Lima:

Name	Location	Description
Sinagoga 1870	José Galvez 282, Miraflores	Located near Miraflores Central Park, it is operated by the Sociedad de Beneficencia Israelita de 1870 since 1938.
Sinagoga Sharón	Carlos Porras Osores 210, San Isidro	Operated by the Unión Israelita, which continues to represent the Ashkenazi community, it also houses the country's Jewish Museum. The museum was inaugurated in 2014.
Jabad Perú	Salaverry 3075, San Isidro	The Bet Chabad functions as an active centre and houses a Talmud Torah.
Sociedad De Beneficencia Israelita Sefaradi	Augusto Bolognesi 201, San Isidro	Formerly located in Jesús María, the building services the Sephardic community. Following its move in the 2000s, it was renamed the "Bet Haknesset Rabi Abraham Benhamu" in honour of the community's rabbi emeritus.

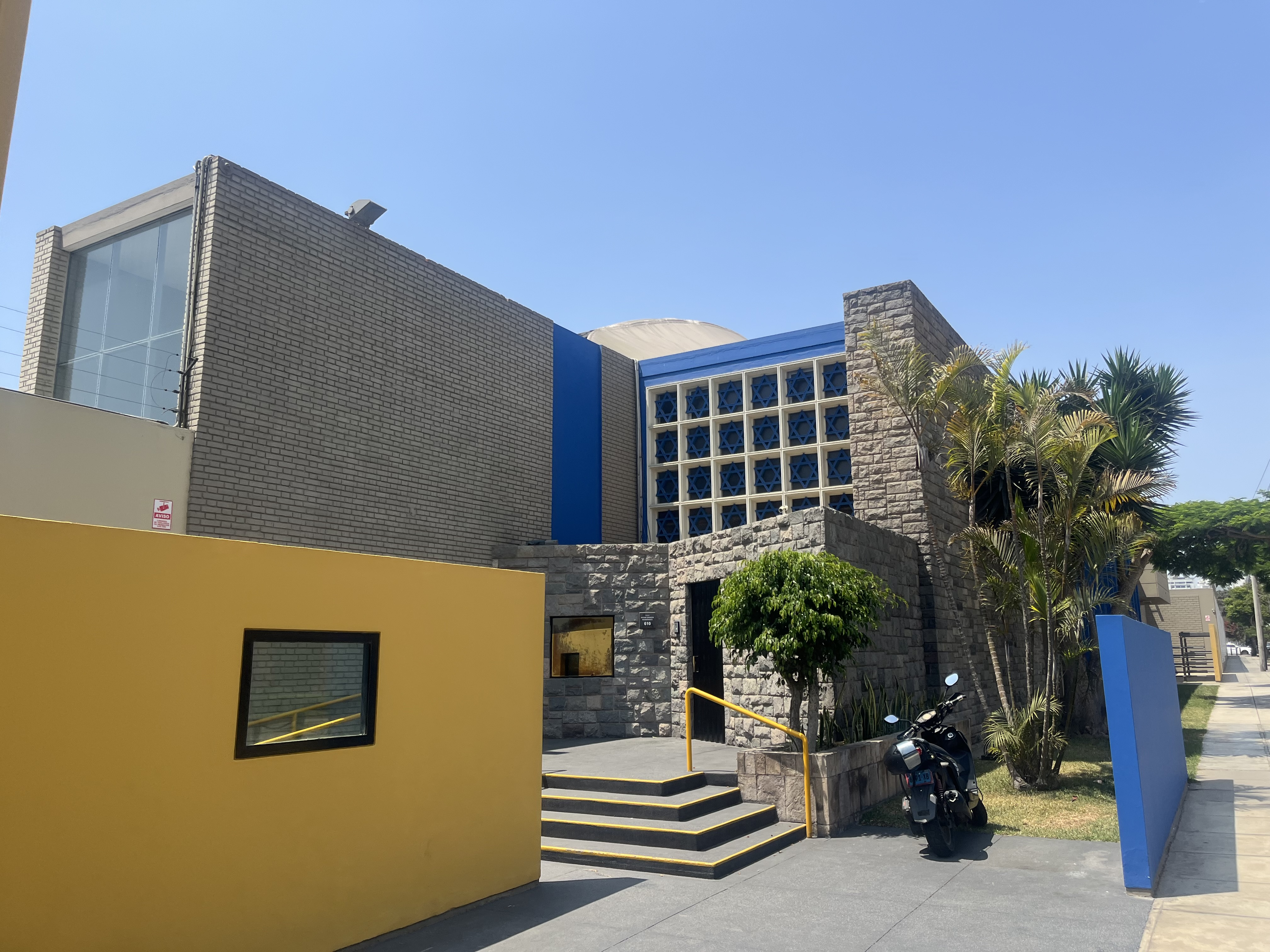
Lima houses Peru's only Jewish school.

Additionally, the León Pinelo school operates since April 24, 1946, and serves as the city's only Jewish school, educating 90% of local Jews. A recreational club, Hebraica, also exists in La Molina Avenue since 1956.

The northeastern city of Iquitos has maintained its small community of Amazonian Jews (also called "Iquitos Jews"), of mixed Moroccan Sephardic, Ashkenazi, and/or Indigenous Peruvian descent, observing some form of Jewish traditions and customs. Some have claimed that there exists a kind of pressure exerted upon this community to adhere to customs that are normative in the broader Jewish community; though these customs have been characterised as specifically Ashkenazi, they are often in fact matters of Jewish law recognised by non-Ashkenazi Jews throughout the world as binding. Iquitos Jews' unique practices and customs are syncretic to varying degrees, influenced by Catholicism and local traditional spiritual traditions. Thus, they come from the mix of Peruvian and Jewish cultures. This community has been rather isolated from the rest of the Peruvian Jewish community, which is concentrated in Lima.

The Iquitos community's claims of Jewish status have been subjected to some question by the Orthodox Jewish leaders of Lima, as the only people Jewish law considers to be Jews are those who are born to a Jewish mother, or who have formally converted. Because the community itself says that its founding members were Jewish men and non-Jewish women, their descendants are not always considered Jewish by Jews who adhere to Jewish law. In the late 20th century, some descendants in Iquitos began to study Judaism and eventually made formal conversions in 2002 and 2004 with the aid of a sympathetic American rabbi from Brooklyn. A few hundred were given permission to make aliyah to Israel. By 2014, nearly 150 more Iquitos Jews had emigrated to Israel. These waves comprised an estimated 80% of the community in Peru, which now numbers only 50 individuals.

In Cuzco, the community was numbered at 200 to 300 people in 2015.

In 2023, the Peruvian ambassador in Tel Aviv reported that around 100 Peruvian citizens had been recruited as reservists of the Israel Defense Forces.

In 2026, Peruvian president José María Balcázar claimed that Jews were partially responsible for World War II during a speech before Lima's Chamber of Commerce. Balcázar later apologised through an official statement following condemnation by the AJP and the Israeli and German embassies.

== Notable people ==
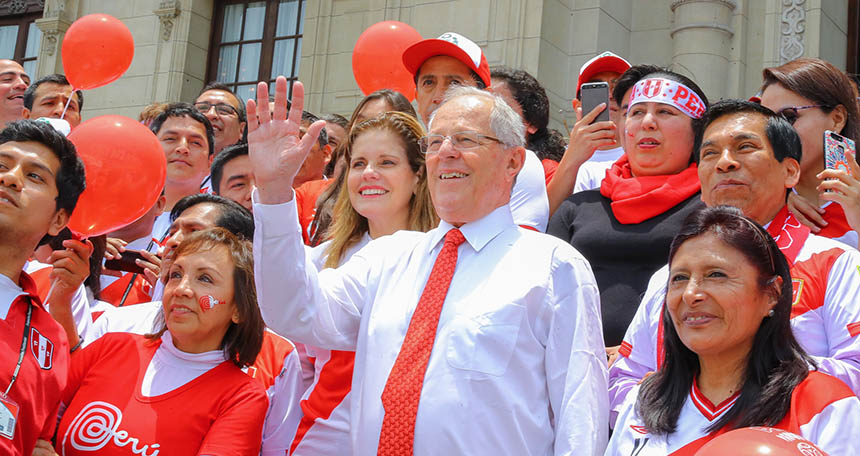
Pedro Pablo Kuczynski served as president of Peru from 2016 to 2018.

- Abraham Moshe Brener, Chief Rabbi of Lima from 1935 to 1962.
- Salomón Lerner Ghitis, Prime Minister of Peru in 2011.
- Efraín Goldenberg, served as Prime Minister (1994–1995), Foreign Minister (1993–1995), and Finance Minister (1999–2000).
- Elsa Hochhäusler, Viennese-born journalist and writer for El Comercio and La Prensa, as well as mother of politician Francisco Sagasti.
- Baruch Ivcher, Israeli-born business tycoon.
- Segismundo and Fernando Jacobi, founders of the first bureau de change in Lima (1860), the Baquíjano Cemetery and of the Sociedad de Beneficiencia Israelita. The former brought a Torah, the first in the city.
- Eliane Karp, French-born anthropologist and First Lady of Peru from 2001 to 2006.
- Wladyslaw Kluger, engineer.
- Pedro Pablo Kuczynski, president of Peru from 2016 to 2018.
- Antonio de León Pinelo, historian, namesake of the country's only Jewish School.
- Salomón Libman, footballer.
- Simón Moses, first spiritual leader of the Sociedad de Beneficiencia Israelita.
- Enrique Oppenheimer, who served alongside Andrés Avelino Cáceres as part of a group called "the musketeers" during the War of the Pacific.
- Rodrigo Orgóñez, captain.
- Manuel Bautista Pérez, merchant.
- David Señor de Castro, second spiritual leader of the Sociedad de Beneficiencia Israelita.
- Yehude Simon, Prime Minister from 2008 to 2009.
- León Trahtemberg, educator and historian of Jewish history.
- David Waisman, Second Vice President of Peru from 2001 until 2006.

== In popular culture ==
The Fire Within: Jews in the Amazonian Rainforest (2008) is a documentary about the Jewish descendants in Iquitos and their efforts to revive Judaism and emigrate to Israel in the late 20th century. It is written, directed and produced by Lorry Salcedo Mitrani. Before that Salcedo published the book (Salcedo: photos, Henry Mitrani Reaño: text) The Eternal Return: Homage to the Jewish Community of Peru [El eterno retorno : retrato de la comunidad judío-peruana] (2002) on the subject.

The 2018 film Utopía, based on the 2002 fire of a nightclub of the same name, features the story of Orly Gomberoff Elon, one of the victims of the fire, as well as her family, all practising Jews.

== See also ==
- Amazonian Jews
- B'nai Moshe
- Immigration to Peru
- Religion in Peru
- History of the Jews in Latin America and the Caribbean
- Peruvian Jews in Israel
