= Sinagoga Sharón =

Synagogue in Lima, Peru

Coordinates: 12.0934°S 77.0501°W

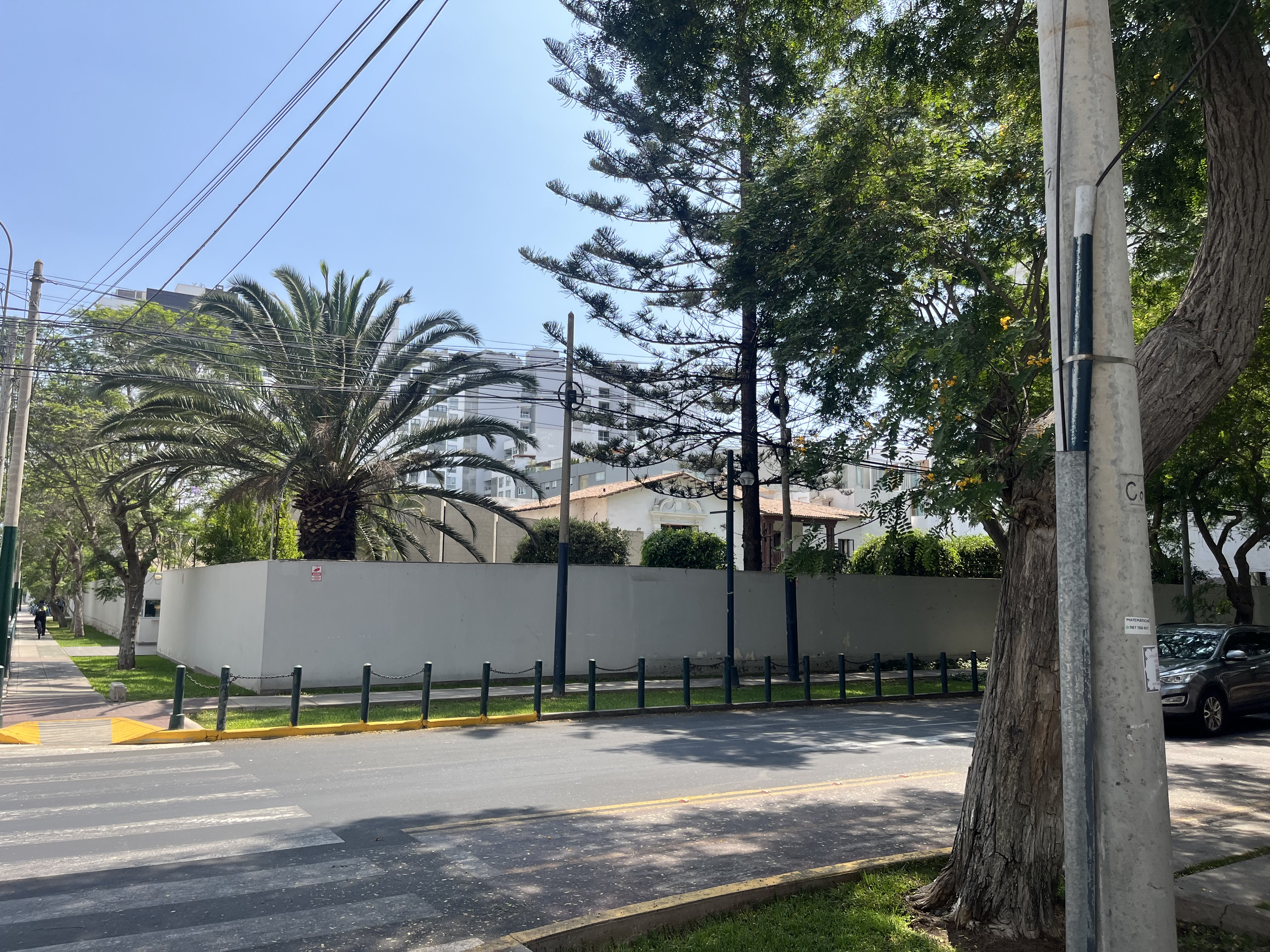

Religion
- Affiliation: Orthodox Judaism
- Ownership: Unión Israelita del Perú
- Leadership: Simantob Nigri

Location
- Location: Calle Carlos Porras Osores 210, San Isidro, Lima, Peru
- Interactive map of Sinagoga Sharón

Architecture
- Established: 20th century

The Sinagoga Sharón (Hebrew: בית הכנסת שרון) is an orthodox synagogue in San Isidro District, Lima. It is one of three synagogues in the district and one of four in the city, the other being located in nearby Miraflores. Since 1987, it is operated by the Unión Israelita del Perú.

Since 2016, the synagogue is headed by Brazilian rabbi Simantob Nigri.

== History ==
The Unión Israelita del Perú was founded in the traditional Chirimoyo neighbourhood on June 11, 1923, being registered with the Peruvian government on November 16, 1929. It was established to represent the new Ashkenazi community, which had arrived from Eastern Europe—notably from Hungary—since around 1912. This organisation hired rabbi Moisés Brener, who arrived in 1934 to provide countrywide religious services. The opposition of Brener's practices by some conservative sectors led to the establishment of three splinter groups during the mid-20th century, among which was Sharón. The reintegration process culminated in 1987, when the inventory of the synagogue operated by the Unión Israelita at Brasil Avenue was moved to Sharón's premises in San Isidro.

In 2008, under the tenure of rabbi Efraim Zik (1999–2009), the building was remodelled by Seinfeld Arquitectos to accommodate the congregation's needs. In 2009, it received a visit from Avigdor Lieberman, then Foreign Minister of Israel, as well as members of the Knesset. The museum was inaugurated in 2014.

The synagogue currently operates a cultural centre and a museum.

== Leadership ==
The following rabbis have led the Unión Israelita del Perú since its establishment:

- Abraham Moshe Brener (1934–1962)
- Baruj Epstein (1966–1967)
- Eljanan Yamnik (1971–1974)
- Naftali Rothenberg (1974–1977)
- Igal Fridman (1982–1985)
- Yaakov Kraus (1987–1998)
- Efraim Zik (1999–2002)
- Menashe Pniel (2002–2003)
- Efraim Zik (2003–2009)
- Itay Meushar (2009–2016)
- Salomon Cohen (2016–2019)
- Simantob Nigri (2019–present)

== See also ==
- History of the Jews in Peru
- Sinagoga 1870
