= Tali Golergant =

Israeli-born Luxembourgish singer-songwriter (born 2000)

Tali טלי
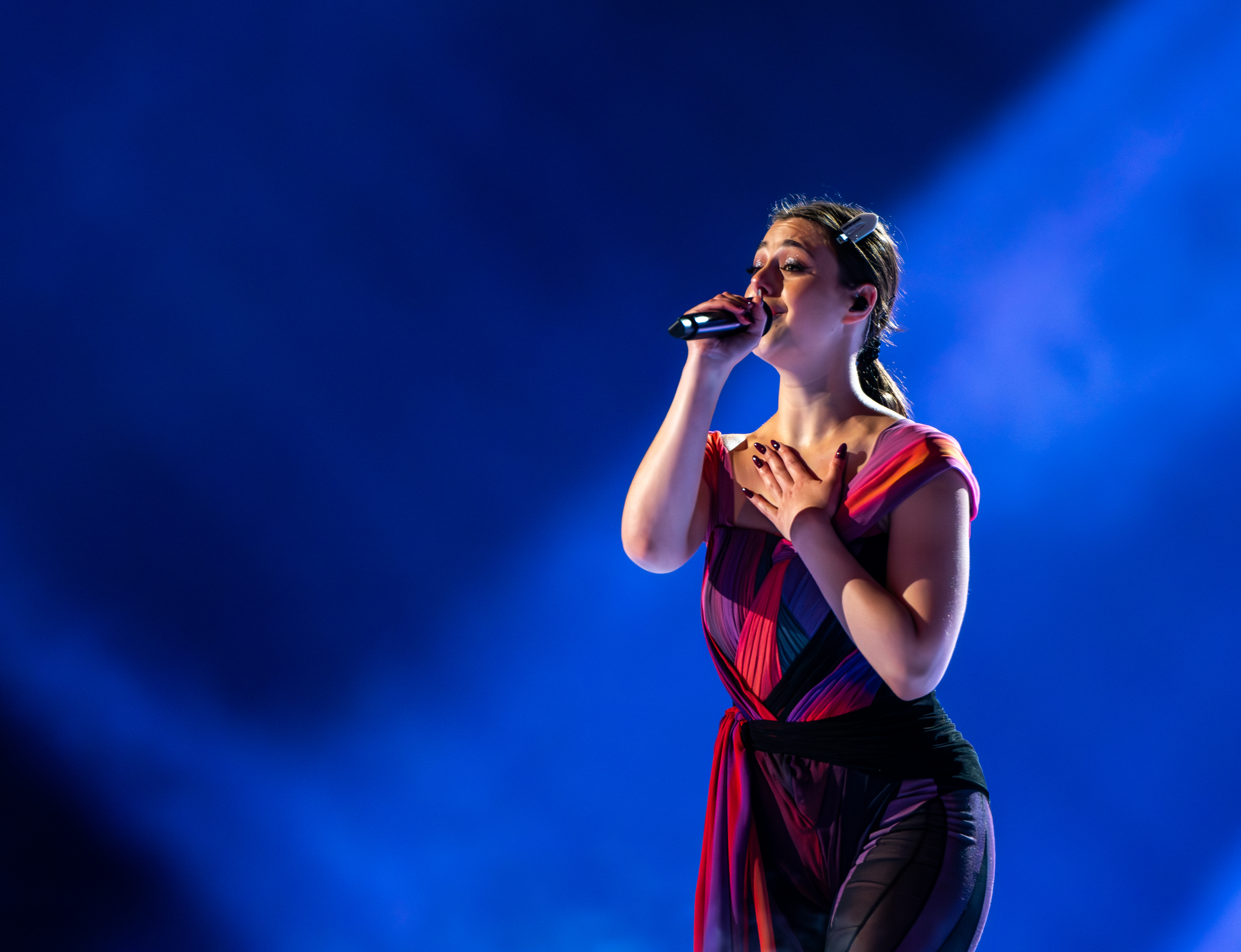
- Tali in 2024

Background information
- Born: Tali Golergant; 26 November 2000 (age 25); Jerusalem, Israel
- Origin: Limpertsberg, Luxembourg
- Genres: Pop; indie; R&B
- Occupations: Singer; songwriter; actress; vocal coach; music teacher
- Instruments: Vocals; piano; guitar
- Years active: 2020–present
- Member of: Blue Stripes
- Website: www.taligolergant.com

Tali Golergant (Hebrew: טלי גולרגנט, romanized: Ṭali Golergent; born 26 November 2000), known mononymously as Tali (stylized in all caps), is an Israeli-born Luxembourgish singer, songwriter, actress, vocal coach and music teacher of Peruvian descent. She represented Luxembourg in the Eurovision Song Contest 2024 with the song "Fighter", finished in thirteenth place in the final with 103 points.

== Biography ==
Golergant was born in Jerusalem, Israel, to a Peruvian Jewish father and an Israeli mother. Following her father's work in banking, she moved with her family, when she was only 6 months old, across Chile, and Argentina, until finally settling at the age of 9 in Limpertsberg, Luxembourg, where she resided for ten years.

She began playing the piano at the age of 7, and began singing, songwriting and acting in theatre at the age of 12. She studied at the International School of Luxembourg, before moving to New York City, United States, to study musical theatre at Marymount Manhattan College, graduating with a Bachelor of Fine Arts (BFA). She lives there as of January 2024.

Golergant is fluent in Hebrew, Spanish, French and English and is able to communicate in German and understand Luxembourgish.

== Career ==
=== 2020–2022: Early releases, Lose You and stage roles ===
Golergant released her debut single "Temporary" on 14 February 2020 at the age of 19, which was followed by her debut EP Lose You on 5 November 2021. Along with her own jazz-funk band, Blue Stripes, she toured local venues in the Lower East Side in Manhattan, New York City, including Rockwood Music Hall, Mercury Lounge, Arlene's Grocery, and Delancey Street. Golergant has been a featured vocalist on other works, including "Carry Me Home" with Max Bartos. In addition, Golergant pursued a career as a stage actress, portraying Tzeitel in Fiddler on the Roof, Sue Snell in Carrie, and Éponine Thénardier in Les Misérables, among others; she has also starred in the independent short film Agua.

=== 2023–2024: Luxembourg Song Contest and Eurovision Song Contest ===
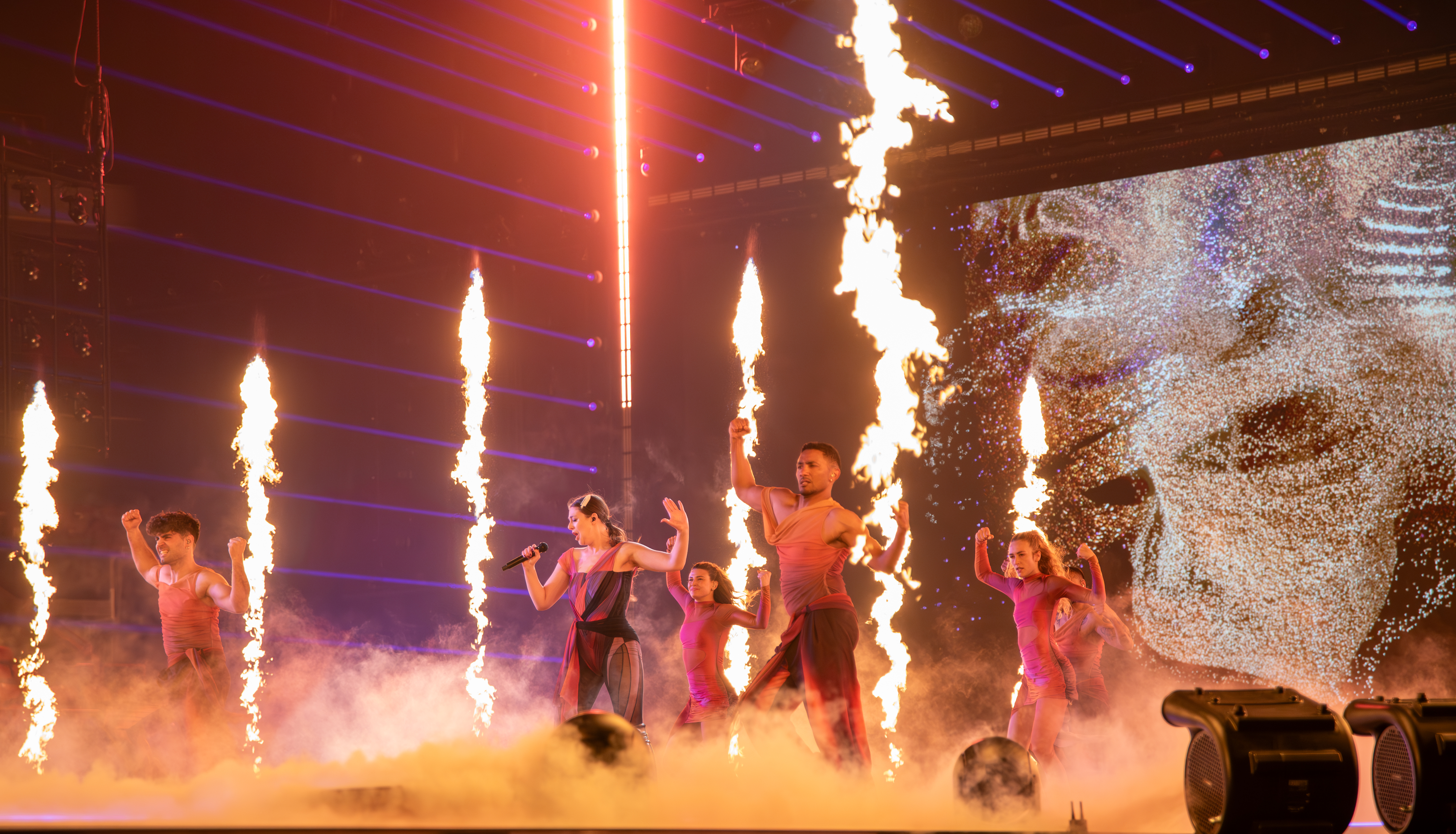
Golergant performing at the Eurovision Song Contest 2024

On 11 December 2023, RTL Lëtzebuerg (RTL) on Today Radio announced Golergant as one of the eight finalists of the Luxembourg Song Contest, the country's national selection for the Eurovision Song Contest 2024. It was later revealed on 9 January 2024 that she would perform the song "Fighter", written by Ana Zimmer, Dario Faini, Manon Romiti, and Silvio Lisbonne. Golergant was drawn to perform last out of the eight entries. In the final on 27 January 2024 at the Rockhal in Esch-sur-Alzette, Luxembourg, Golergant performed her entry "Fighter", winning the first round of the competition with 182 points and qualifying as one of the top three acts for the superfinal. In the final voting round, she secured overall victory by obtaining 178 points from the combined international juries and public televote, earning the right to represent Luxembourg after an absence of 31 years since its last participation in 1993.

On 7 May 2024, Golergant competed with her entry "Fighter" in the first semi-final of the contest, held at the Malmö Arena in Malmö, Sweden, appearing fifteenth in the running order and closing the show as the final act of the night. She successfully qualified for the final by placing fifth with 117 points from the public televote. Following the results, Golergant stated in an interview, "I can't believe we're in the final, it's insane," adding, "I'm so shocked. And I can't believe they put us last, I nearly had a heart attack." In the final held on 11 May, Golergant performed fourth in the running order and ultimately finished in thirteenth place out of 25 competing countries. She achieved a total of 103 points, receiving a split score of 83 points from the international juries, where she placed eleventh, and 20 points from the public televote, finishing seventeenth in the audience voting.

=== 2025–present: Wander and Red Haven ===
Following her performance at Eurovision and release of her own EP Wander, Golergant has performed at different EU festivals including Francofolies Festival, USINA Festival, Echterlive Festival, her own solo show at Den Atelier and two guest star performances with the Luxembourg Philharmonic Orchestra. She opened for artists including Zoe Wees, Marc Rebillet and Ronan Keating. In October 2025, Golergant performed as guest artist at the Ceremony of Accession to the Throne of the new Grand Duke of Luxembourg.

In 2026, Golergant began a new musical era with the release of three singles: "Style" on 30 January, "Strawberry Fragrance" on 13 March, and "(Senti)mental" on 10 April. The songs preceded her second extended play, Red Haven, which was released on 8 May 2026. The EP explored themes of romance, sensuality, identity and self-confidence, marking a stylistic progression from the introspective themes of Wander.

During the same period, Golergant continued performing across Luxembourg and internationally, including guest appearances in Miami. On 8 May 2026, she headlined the release show for Red Haven at the Rockhal Club, her second headline concert and her largest solo show in Luxembourg to date.

== Artistry ==
Golergant describes her music as a blend of pop, indie and R&B. She cites Billie Eilish, Lizzy McAlpine, Sara Bareilles and Lady Gaga among her influences.

== Discography ==
=== Extended plays ===
List of EPs, with selected details
Title	Details
Lose You	Released: 5 November 2021; Label: Independent; Formats: Digital download, streaming
Wander	Released: 2 May 2025; Label: Bel Air Records; Formats: Digital download, streaming
Red Haven	Released: 8 May 2026; Label: Independent; Formats: Digital download, streaming

=== Singles ===
Title	Year	Peak chart positions				Album or EP
Title	Year	LUX	GRE Int.	LTU	SWE Heat.	Album or EP
"Temporary"	2020	—	—	—	—	Non-album singles
"By the Ivory"	2020	—	—	—	—	Non-album singles
"Mountains Between Us"	2020	—	—	—	—	Non-album singles
"Lose You"	2021	—	—	—	—	Lose You
"At All"	2021	—	—	—	—	Lose You
"Garden of Eden" (with Sarah Vera)	2022	—	—	—	—	Non-album singles
"Dancing Alone"	2023	—	—	—	—	Non-album singles
"Fighter"	2024	4	39	27	8	Wander
"Dear Parents"	2025	—	—	—	—	Wander
"So Far So Good" (with Sean Biopcik)	2025	—	—	—	—	Wander
"Style"	2026	—	—	—	—	Red Haven
"Strawberry Fragrance"	2026	—	—	—	—	Red Haven
"(Senti)mental"	2026	—	—	—	—	Red Haven
"—" denotes a recording that did not chart or was not released in that territory.

Awards and achievements
Preceded by Modern Times with "Donne-moi une chance"	Luxembourg in the Eurovision Song Contest; 2024	Succeeded by Laura Thorn with "La poupée monte le son'"
