= Israel–Peru relations =

- Israel: Peru

Diplomatic mission
- Embassy of Israel, Lima: Embassy of Peru, Tel Aviv

Israel–Peru relations are foreign relations and diplomatic ties between the State of Israel and the Republic of Peru. They established diplomatic relations on 1 January 1958. Israel has an embassy in Lima. Peru has an embassy in Tel Aviv. Both countries are members of the World Trade Organization and the United Nations.

== History ==
Prior to the establishment of a Jewish state, a Jewish community existed in Peru, dating back to the Spanish conquest of the Inca Empire. The original community virtually disappeared as a result of the Peruvian Inquisition, although the rubber boom in the Peruvian Amazon led to the immigration of a number of Sephardic Jews starting in 1880. This community again grew during the early 20th century and around World War II. On June 27, 1945, the "Pro-Hebrew Palestine" committee was established, headed by José Gálvez Barrenechea and composed of people such as Luis E. Valcárcel and César Miró, among others.

Peru was part of the United Nations Special Committee on Palestine (UNSCOP), represented by Alberto Ulloa Sotomayor. The committee recommended that the British Mandate be partitioned into two states, with Jerusalem being placed under international administration. Nevertheless, the State of Israel was declared independent in 1948, and Peru recognised the new state on February 9, 1949.

Starting in 1950, the Jewish community in Peru became strongly interested in Zionism. Marcos Roitman, an ardent Jewish-Peruvian Zionist, was nominated as honorary consul of Israel in 1951, inaugurating the consulate at Colmena Avenue in late 1953.

=== Bilateral relations ===
Relations between both states were formally established and thus elevated to legation level in 1956, and to embassy level in 1958, with Tuvia Arazi serving as Israel's first ambassador to Peru. Despite the number of conflicts involving Israel, relations have not been severed since their establishment, and Peru has contributed to several United Nations peacekeeping operations in the region.

In 1998, Israel and Peru agreed to talks on establishing free trade between the two countries.

During the devastating earthquakes that have hit Peru (1970, 2005, 2007), Israel was the first country to send help. Israel sent the Israel Defense Forces Unit 669 Search and Rescue unit, along with members of the IDF medical corp which set up a field hospital.

In 2001, Eliane Karp, a former Israeli, became First Lady of Peru.

In 2011, former chief of staff of the Peruvian Armed Forces, General Francisco Contreras said, "We definitely need to be concerned with the growing presence of Iran in South America. It appears that Iranian organizations provide support to other terrorist organizations, and that there is cooperation between them. There is something strange in the relationship Chavez has forged with Iran, as is the presence of the Iranian defense minister in Bolivia on a recent visit." According to Contreras, countries like Israel and Peru need to increase cooperation to combat the growing terrorist threat.

== High-level visits ==
High-level visit from Israel to Peru

- Foreign Minister Golda Meir (1959)
- Agriculture Minister Ya'akov Tzur (1996)
- Foreign Minister Shimon Peres (2001)
- Foreign Minister Avigdor Lieberman (2009)
- Public Security Minister Yitzhak Aharonovich (2012)
- Agriculture Minister Yair Shamir (2013)

High-level visit from Peru to Israel

- First Lady Eliane Karp (2003)
- Agriculture Minister José León Rivera (2004)
- President Alejandro Toledo (2005)
- Production Minister David Lemor (2006)
- President Ollanta Humala (2014)
- Foreign Minister Eda Rivas (2014)
- Economy Minister Luis Miguel Castilla (2014)
- Agriculture Minister Milton von Hesse (2014)

== Trade ==
Bilateral trade was $37 million in 1997. $31 million coming from Israeli exports to Peru. Israeli exports to Peru rose 71.5% in the first quarter of 1998 compared with the same period in the previous year. Israeli exports consisted of machinery and plastics. Israel imports food, beverages and tobacco from Peru.

== Strategic partnerships ==
=== Military ===
Israel's defense ties with Peru go back several decades, and in recent years include the sale of Rafael's Spike anti-tank missile to the Peruvian army, as well as Israeli drones to its air force. In 2009, the government of Peru signed a $9 million deal with Global CST, a defense-consulting firm based in Petah Tikva, run by former IDF general Yisrael Ziv. Peruvian General Contreras said he decided to hire Ziv's company to help train the military how to combat terrorists from the Sendero Luminoso (Shining Path) Maoist organization.

According to Contreras, Ziv's company focused on training elite forces for special counterterror operations, strengthening Peruvian intelligence networks, and assisting security forces in working together to kill or capture Sendero Luminoso members. Contreras said that despite pressure from the US not to hire a private company, the combination of assistance from the US Military and Ziv's company turned the tide in Peru's war on terror, and that "The combination brought a major change, and our military became more offensive and took the battle to the terrorists, instead of always being on the defensive."

In May 2013, Peru's Minister of Agriculture, Milton von Hesse, held talks with his Israeli counterpart Yair Shamir to strengthen cooperation in agriculture and implement projects. Von Hesse said that Israel has developed a modern agricultural technology to address the problems caused by deserts, and Peru is eager to learn from their experience, and therefore achieve efficient water management in arid areas.

== Resident diplomatic missions ==
- Israel has an embassy in Lima.
- Peru has an embassy in Tel Aviv.

== See also ==
- Foreign relations of Israel
- Foreign relations of Peru
- List of ambassadors of Peru to Israel
- List of ambassadors of Israel to Peru
- International recognition of Israel
- History of the Jews in Latin America
- B'nai Moshe
