= List of ambassadors of Israel to Peru =

Ambassador of Israel to Peru
- Incumbent; Eran Yuvan since 2022
- Inaugural holder: Tuvia Arazi
- Formation: 1958
- Website: Embassy website

The ambassador of Israel to Peru is the official representative of the State of Israel to the Republic of Peru. Since December 2011, the embassy is located in San Isidro District, Lima.

Israel and Peru officially established bilateral relations on January 1, 1958. Prior to the establishment of any formal relations, an honorary consulate was inaugurated at the fourth floor of a building in La Colmena Avenue in late 1953, which was replaced by an embassy in Santa Beatriz that operated at the sixth floor of a building there until 2011.

== List of ambassadors ==
№	Name	Term begin	Term end	Head of state	Notes
1	Tuvia Arazi	1956	1960	David Ben-Gurion	First formal representative to Peru.
2	Michael Simon	1960	1963	David Ben-Gurion	
3	Netanel Lorch	1963	1967	Levi Eshkol	Also served as Ambassador on Special Mission in 1989.
4	Moshe Yuval	1967	1971	Levi Eshkol	
5	Moshe Avidan	1971	1975	Golda Meir	
6	Michael Michael	1975	1979	Yitzhak Rabin	
7	Gideon Tadmor	1979	1986	Menachem Begin	
8	David Tourgeman	1986	1988	Yitzhak Shamir	
9	Yuval Metzer	1988	1994	Yitzhak Shamir	
10	Joel Salpak	1994	1998	Yitzhak Rabin	Briefly taken hostage in late 1996.
11	Rafael Eldad	1998	2002	Benjamin Netanyahu	
12	Ori Noy	2002	2005	Ariel Sharon	
13	Walid Mansour	2005	2009	Ariel Sharon	
14	Yoav Bar-On	2009	2011	Benjamin Netanyahu	
15	Modi Ephraim	2011	2014	Benjamin Netanyahu	The embassy moved in December 2011.
16	Ehud Eitam	2014	2016	Benjamin Netanyahu	
17	Raphael Singer	2016	2018	Benjamin Netanyahu	
18	Asaf Ichilevich	2018	2022	Benjamin Netanyahu	
19	Eran Yuvan	2022	Incumbent	Yair Lapid	

== See also ==
- Israel–Peru relations
- List of ambassadors of Peru to Israel
