= Carlos Jaime Marcos Stiglich Bérninzon =

Peruvian diplomat

Jaime Stiglich Berninzon

Peruvian Ambassador to Egypt
- In office 1975–1975
- Succeeded by: Hugo César Portugal Carbajal

Peruvian Ambassador to Sweden
- In office May 1993 – October 1995
- Preceded by: Julio Fernández Dávila
- Succeeded by: 1988; 1993; Claudio Enrique Sosa Voysest; José Antonio Bellina Acevedo

Peruvian Ambassador to Israel
- In office November 1995 – June 1999
- Preceded by: Jorge Torres Aciego
- Succeeded by: Nicolás Alfonso Roncagliolo Higueras

Personal details
- Born: 22 November 1945 Lima, Peru
- Died: January 27, 2015 (aged 69) São Paulo, Brazil
- Spouse: Susana Watson Aramburú
- Children: María Luisa Stiglich Watson (1973), Susana Stiglich Watson (1974), Andrea Stiglich Watson (1978), Jaime Stiglich Watson (1985)
- Parent(s): Luisa Cristina Stiglich and German Mercedes Rodolfo Stiglich Gazzani
- Education: From 1963 to 1965 he studied Humanities at the Pontifical Catholic University of Peru.; From 1966 to 1970 he studied Law and Political Science, at the National University of San Marcos.; From 1978 to he studied Diploma in International Relations, at the Universidad del Salvador in Buenos Aires, Argentina.; From 1982 to 1983 he obtained a degree as Doctorate in Law from the Autonomous University of Madrid in Spain.; From March to November 1970 Hecompleted a postgraduate degree program ECLAC Commercial Promotion Expert, Santiago, Chile; From 1969 to 1976 he completed a postgraduate degree program Improvement Cycles - VIII and XV -, Peruvian Diplomatic Academy; From March to December of 2001 he completed a postgraduate degree program Senior Management Program, University of Piura; In 1978 he obtained a degree as Bachelor of Law, National University of San Marcos; In 1968 he obtained a degree as Career Diplomat, Academia Diplomática del Perú.; In 1978 he obtained a degree as Bachelor in International Relations, Diplomatic Academy of Peru; In 2003 he obtained a degree as a Lawyer from the National University of San Marcos.

Jaime Stiglich Berninzon (22 November 1945 – 27 January 2015) was a Peruvian diplomat.

== Career ==
On January 1, 1969 he entered the diplomatic service as a Third Secretary. On January 1, 1972 he was appointed Second Secretary. On January 1, 1975 he was appointed First Secretary. On January 1, 1979 he was appointed Director. On January 1, 1982 he was appointed Minister Counselor On January 1, 1987 he was appointed Minister. On January 1, 1991 he was appointed Ambassador.

- From April 2006 to 2011 he was Director of the Decentralized Office of the Ministry of Foreign Affairs for Tacna and Moquegua.

== In the foreign ministry ==
- 1969-71 Third Secretary, Coordinator of the Undersecretariat of Economic Affairs and Integration
- 1976-77 First Secretary, Head of the Department of International Commodity Policy of the Directorate of Economic Affairs
- 1984 Minister Counselor, Sub-Director of Integration of the Undersecretariat of Economic Affairs and Integration
- 1985 (Jan-Jun) Minister-Counselor, highlighted to the Presidency of the Republic to implement a cooperation program for children in the Office of the First Lady
- 1986-87 Minister-Counselor and Minister, Director of Programming and Administrative Coordination, in charge of the financial management of the public funds of the Ministry of Foreign Affairs as well as the support of the Budget before the Congress of the Republic.
- 1992 Ambassador, Cabinet Director of the Ministerial Office
- 1993 (Feb-Apr) Ambassador, Advisor to the Minister of Foreign Affairs
- 1999 (Jul) until Dec 2001 Ambassador, Executive Director of the Office of Economic Promotion, in charge of Commercial Promotion; of Investments and Tourism
- 2002 (Jan-Mar) Ambassador, Advisor to the Diplomatic Academy of Peru
- 2002 (Apr-Jun) Ambassador, highlighted to the National Chamber of Commerce, Production and Services
- (PERUCAMARAS), as Executive Director (guild that brings together 68 Chambers of Commerce throughout the country)

== Abroad ==
- 1971-72-73-74 Third, Second and First Secretary of the Embassy of Peru in Chile
- 1975 First Secretary and Chargé d'affaires of the Embassy of Peru in Cairo in the Arab Republic of Egypt.
- 1977-78 First Secretary and Counselor of the Embassy of Peru in Argentina
- 1979 Counselor, General Consul attached to the Consulate General in Barcelona
- 1981-84 Counselor and Minister Counselor of the Embassy of Peru in Spain
- 1988-90 Minister, Alternate Permanent Representative of Peru to International Organizations, based in Geneva, Switzerland
- 1991 Ambassador, Alternate Permanent Representative of Peru to International Organizations, based in Geneva, Switzerland
- From November May 1993 to October 1995 he was ambassador in Stockholm and concurrently accredited in Denmark and Norway, and the Republics of Iceland and Finland.
- From November 1995 to June 1999 he was ambassador in Tel Aviv.
- 2002 Jul-Nov Ambassador, Consul General of Peru in Shanghai, People's Republic of China.

== Commissions ==
- He has participated in countless meetings as a Delegate; Head of Delegation and Representative of Peru in Conferences and Assemblies of the CAN, SELA, APEC, UNCTAD, GATT, WIPO, ILO, Human Rights, WTO, ITU, WMO, IOM, UNHCR, OAS, UNEP, ICRC, ECLAC, etc.
- He has been Head of Delegation, representing the Ministry of Foreign Affairs, to negotiate Investment Promotion and Guarantee Agreements with Sweden, Finland, Norway, Denmark, Croatia, Egypt, Indonesia, Israel, etc. as well as in the renegotiation of the Peruvian External Debt.
- He has integrated the Board of Directors of the Export Promotion Commission of Peru (PROMPEX), on behalf of the Minister of Foreign Affairs (July 1999 to Dec 2001)
- He has participated as a guest in various Directories of the Confederation of Business Institutions of Peru (CONFIEP) linked to the promotion of exports and the acquisition of investments, on behalf of the Ministry of Foreign Affairs.

== Publications ==
1. The Reopening of the Suez Canal, 1975, Embassy of Peru, Cairo, Arab Republic of Egypt, 1975
2. Possibilities of an Economic-Commercial Projection to Africa and the Middle East, Embassy of Peru, Buenos Aires, Argentina, 1978
3. Peru, Road to Democracy, Notebooks of the University of Salamanca, 1981

== Experience in the private sector ==
1. Advisor for International Affairs of the Directory of the Confederation of Peruvian Business Institutions (CONFIEP)
2. Executive Director of the Peruvian Chamber of Commerce, Production and Services (PERÚ CÁMARAS)
3. He has been General Manager of the company PKS Industrial SAC, which managed a bottling plant for soft drinks March 2003 - February 2006
4. He has been the Administrative Manager of the Puerto Nuevo SAC Real Estate company that designed an ecological beach at Km. 72.5 Panamericana Sur

== Decorations ==
- Entrust of Number Isabel La Católica of the Kingdom of Spain
- Grand Officer of the Order of Merit of the Republic of Chile
- Great Cru
