= Peruvian Jews in Israel =

There are several groups of Peruvian Jews in Israel.

== B'nai Moshe ==
B'nai Moshe, commonly known as "Inca Jews" are small group of several hundred converts to Judaism originally from the city of Trujillo, Peru. They started to be formally converted during 1985–1987, and about 500 of whom emigrated to Israel in 1990s.

Most B'nai Moshe now live in the West Bank, mostly in Elon Moreh and Kfar Tapuach.

== Amazonian Jews ==
A group of so-called Amazonian Jews from Iquitos, Peru immigrated to Israel in the late 20th century; they had to undergo formal conversion. Some of the Peruvians descended from male Sephardi Jews from Morocco who had gone to work in the city during the Amazon rubber boom in the late 19th and early 20th centuries. They had intermarried with Peruvian women, establishing families that gradually became assimilated as Catholics. In the 1990s, one descendant led an exploration and study of Judaism; eventually a few hundred adopted Jewish practices and converted before making aliyah to Israel. The first 98 new immigrants, 18 families, have emigrated to Israel in 2010, and settled in Beer Sheva and Ramla.

Another 150 immigrants came to Israel from Peru during 2013 - 2014 and they were mostly settled in Ramla.

As of 2020 there were more formal converts in Iquitos willing to move to Israel, but their applications stayed unprocessed for unknown reasons.

The Fire Within: Jews in the Amazonian Rainforest (2008) is a documentary about the Jewish descendants in Iquitos and their efforts to revive Judaism and emigrate to Israel in the late 20th century. It is written, directed and produced by Lorry Salcedo Mitrani. Before that Salcedo published the book (Salcedo: photos, Henry Mitrani Reaño: text) The Eternal Return: Homage to the Jewish Community of Peru [El eterno retorno : retrato de la comunidad judío-peruana] (2002) on the subject.

== Other ==
90 more converted immigrants (18 families) from Peru were settled in Alon Shvut and Karmei Tzur in 2002, mostly from Lima.

== See also ==
- Aliyah from Latin America in the 2000s
- Gabriela Böhm
- History of the Jews in Peru
- Israel–Peru relations
