= Sinagoga 1870 =

Synagogue in Lima, Peru

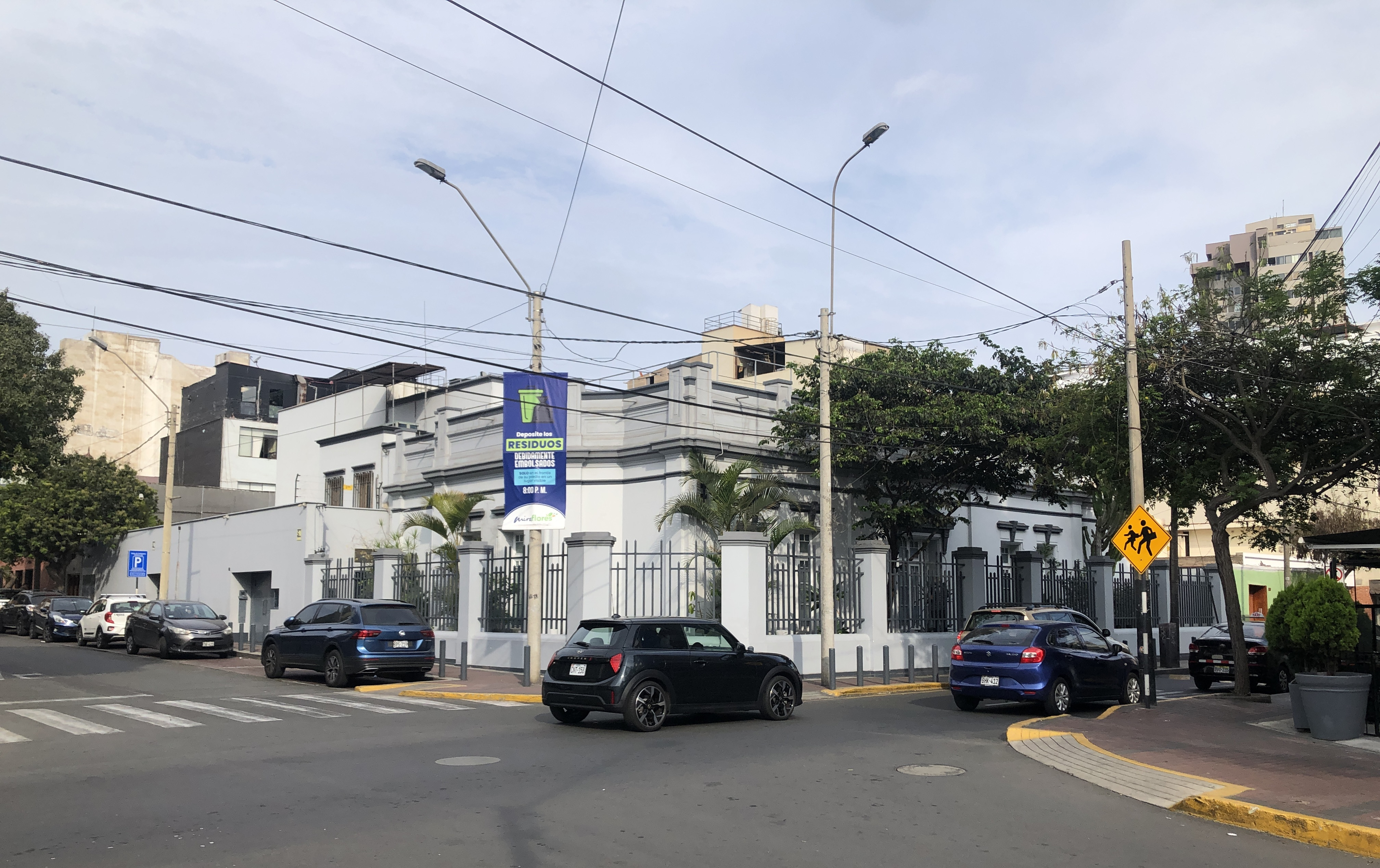

Religion
- Affiliation: Conservative Judaism
- Ownership: Sociedad de Beneficencia Israelita de 1870
- Leadership: Guillermo Bronstein

Location
- Location: Calle José Galvez 282, Miraflores, Lima, Peru
- Interactive map of Sinagoga 1870

Architecture
- Established: 1938
- Completed: 2000
- Demolished: 1999

The Sinagoga 1870, named after its parent organisation, is a Conservative synagogue in Miraflores District, Lima. It is the only synagogue in the district and one of four synagogues in the city, the other three being located in San Isidro. Many of its members are Holocaust survivors.

Since April 24, 1985, the synagogue is headed by Argentine rabbi Guillermo Bronstein.

== History ==
The Sociedad de Beneficencia Israelita de 1870 was founded in the late 19th century by the first Jews to arrive in Lima. With the arrival of German-Jewish immigrants that started in 1933, it was reorganised as the Sociedad Israelita de Socorros Mutuos de Judíos de habla Alemana and registered with the Peruvian government on June 30, 1938. In 2005, the congregation was numbered at about 200 families in total.

In 1938, the now registered society started renting an old house in Libertad Street from the British Charity (Beneficiencia Británica), eventually purchasing it in 1948 with the financial assistance of its members. Prior to this arrangement, prayers took place at rabbi Leopoldo Weil's house, at 320 Juan Fanning street. Due to the society's increasing membership and the building's age, it was demolished in 1999 and rebuilt, being inaugurated on May 10, 2000.

== Leadership ==
- Leopoldo Weil (1938–1940)
- Michael Siegel (1941–1956)
- Lothar Goldstein (1957–1966)
- David Spritzer (1967–1969)
- Claudio Kaiser (1970–1976)
- Zoev Goldik (1977–1984)
- Guillermo Bronstein (1985–present)

== See also ==
- History of the Jews in Peru
- Sinagoga Sharón
