= Carlos Daniel Chavez-Taffur Schmidt =

Peruvian diplomat

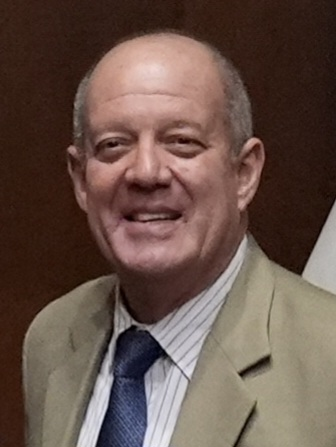
- Chávez-Taffur in 2024

Ambassador of Peru to Israel
- In office May 16, 2019 – November 9, 2020
- Preceded by: Alfredo Raúl Chuquihuara Chil

Personal details
- Born: Carlos Daniel Chavez-Taffur Schmidt; August 29, 1960 (age 66) Lima, Peru
- Spouse: married
- Children: two
- Education: He graduated from the Diplomatic Academy of Peru

Carlos Daniel Chavez-Taffur Schmidt born 1960 in Lima is a Peruvian diplomat. On January 1, 1983, he entered the Foreign Service. On January 1, 2016, he was promoted as ambassador.

Chávez-Taffur was employed in Caracas and Madrid. He was consul of Peru in Madrid, Spain; at the Consulate General of Peru in Boston, United States of America. He was employed in Ottawa, Brussels and Santiago de Chile.

== Education ==
He is Master of Arts of public administration of the John F. Kennedy School of Government Harvard University and has a Magister degree in public administration of the Instituto Universitario de Investigación Ortega y Gasset of the Complutense University of Madrid.
