= B'nai Moshe =

Small group of several hundred converts to Judaism

Total population
- c. 2,500

Regions with significant populations
- Peru: 1,600 prospective converts
- (Israel) Israeli-occupied West Bank: 900 (est.)

Languages
- Spanish, Modern Hebrew

Religion
- Judaism

The B'nai Moshe (Hebrew: בני משה, "Children of Moses"), also known as Inca Jews, are a small group of several hundred converts to Judaism originally from the city of Trujillo, Peru, to the north of the capital city Lima. Judaism moved to the south into Arequipa and to other populated cities like Piura.

Most B'nai Moshe now live in Lima and Trujillo. And some B'nai Moshe are in Israel and the West Bank, mostly in Kfar Tapuach and Elon Moreh, along with Yemenite Jews, Russian Jews and others.

== "Inca Jews" ==
While Inca Jews is not the community's official designation, it is popular outside the community and is derived from the fact that they can trace descent from Peru's indigenous Amerindian people, although mostly in the form of mestizos (persons of mixed Spanish, Amerindian descent, and Spanish Jewish ancestors) and the association of that country's native population with the Incas.

== History ==
The community was founded in 1966 by a local man of Trujillo named Segundo Villanueva, who began studying Judaism at the age of twelve in 1939, while living in the city of Cajamarca. Villanueva founded a religious group called Israel de Dios ("Israel of God") that followed Jewish practices as described in the Hebrew Bible. In 1967, Villanueva took 19 families of his movement to settle in the Peruvian Amazon near Iquitos, forming a settlement called Hebrón. In 1970, Villanueva and his brother Álvaro visited Lima to meet with the Jewish community there. The only Jewish leader who agreed to meet with them was Rabbi Abraham ben Hamu of the Sephardic synagogue. He gave them books and arranged for a Jewish physician to circumcise the brothers and the other men of Israel de Dios. In 1971, the majority of the community returned to Trujillo, with a few families remaining in the Amazon and Álvaro moving to Lima to establish a new congregation there.

== Conversion and aliyah ==
In 1980, Villanueva met with the Israeli embassy in Lima. Through the embassy, he met David Liss, an Israeli engineer who lobbied for rabbis to come to Peru and formally convert them. One of these, Rabbi Eliyahu Avichail, was the founder of Amishav, an organization dedicated to finding lost and displaced Jews and reconnecting them to Judaism.

In 1985, Villanueva made contact with the Lubavitcher Rebbe, who sent Rabbi Myron Zuber to Peru to help with their formal conversions. In 1988, Zuber arrived in Peru and aided the converts in matters such as how to properly observe kashrut and Shabbat.

As a result of the Lima community's continuing reluctance, it was eventually decided that the B'nai Moshe could not reach their full potential in Peru, and decided that they make aliyah (emigration) to Israel once converted. In 1989, Rabbi Avichail and Rabbi Mordechai Oriah, head of the Haifa religious court, flew to Peru, where they joined Lima Rabbi Jacob Krauss to form a Beit Din to convert the community. The rabbis converted about 60 people from the Trujillo community at the Moche River, and another 15 from the Lima community in the Pacific Ocean. The Beit Din initially performed formal conversions for about 300 members of the community in 1991, almost all of whom emigrated to Israel, who were followed by an additional 200 several years later. A community of around 30 B'nai Moshe moved to Lima at the same time. Another 84 were formally converted in 2001.

== See also ==
- History of the Jews in Peru
- Peruvian Jews in Israel
- Amazonian Jews
- Jewish ethnic divisions
