= Abraham Moshe Brener =

Polish Rabbi in Peru

Rabbi Abraham Moshe Brener
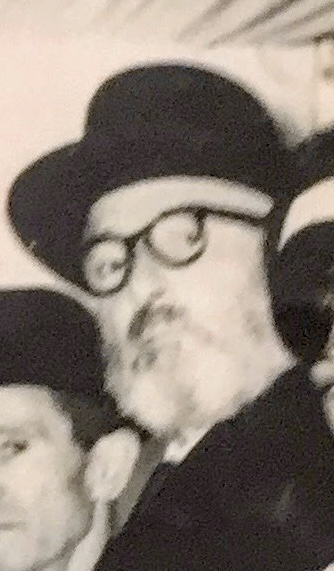
- Title: Chief Rabbi of Lima, Peru, 1935–1962

Personal life
- Born: Abraham Moshe Brener Tyszowce, Poland
- Died: January 5, 1968 (4 Tevet 5728) New York
- Buried: Jerusalem, Israel
- Spouse: Chana Sheindel Brener
- Children: Rabbi Pynchas Brener
- Parent: Pinchas Brener

Religious life
- Religion: Judaism
- Profession: Rabbi

Jewish leader
- Successor: Rabbi Baruj Epstein

Abraham Moshe Brener (Rabino Moises Brener) (Hebrew: אברהם משה ברנר; died January 5, 1968) was the former Chief Rabbi (Gran Rabino) of Lima, Peru. He served as the Chief Rabbi of Lima from the mid-1930s to 1962. Following his tenure, Rabbi Brener moved to New York City.

== Peru ==
In 1935, Rabbi Brener, arrived in Lima. Initially he was not officially hired by the community, but he was an experienced mohel and shochet, as well as cantor, so he quickly took over as Rabbi. Together with the completion of the construction of its own synagogue (La Unión Israelita) in 1934, the community became an organized and official institution. Between the 1950s and 1960s, members of La Unión Israelita created three other synagogues: Malvas, Adat Israel, and Sharón. Rabbi Brener traveled to different provinces to circumcise babies, and others were circumcised at his home when they were older. Rabbi Brener served in Lima for 30 years until 1962. He retired and moved to New York, where he died a few years later. He was buried in Jerusalem, Israel.

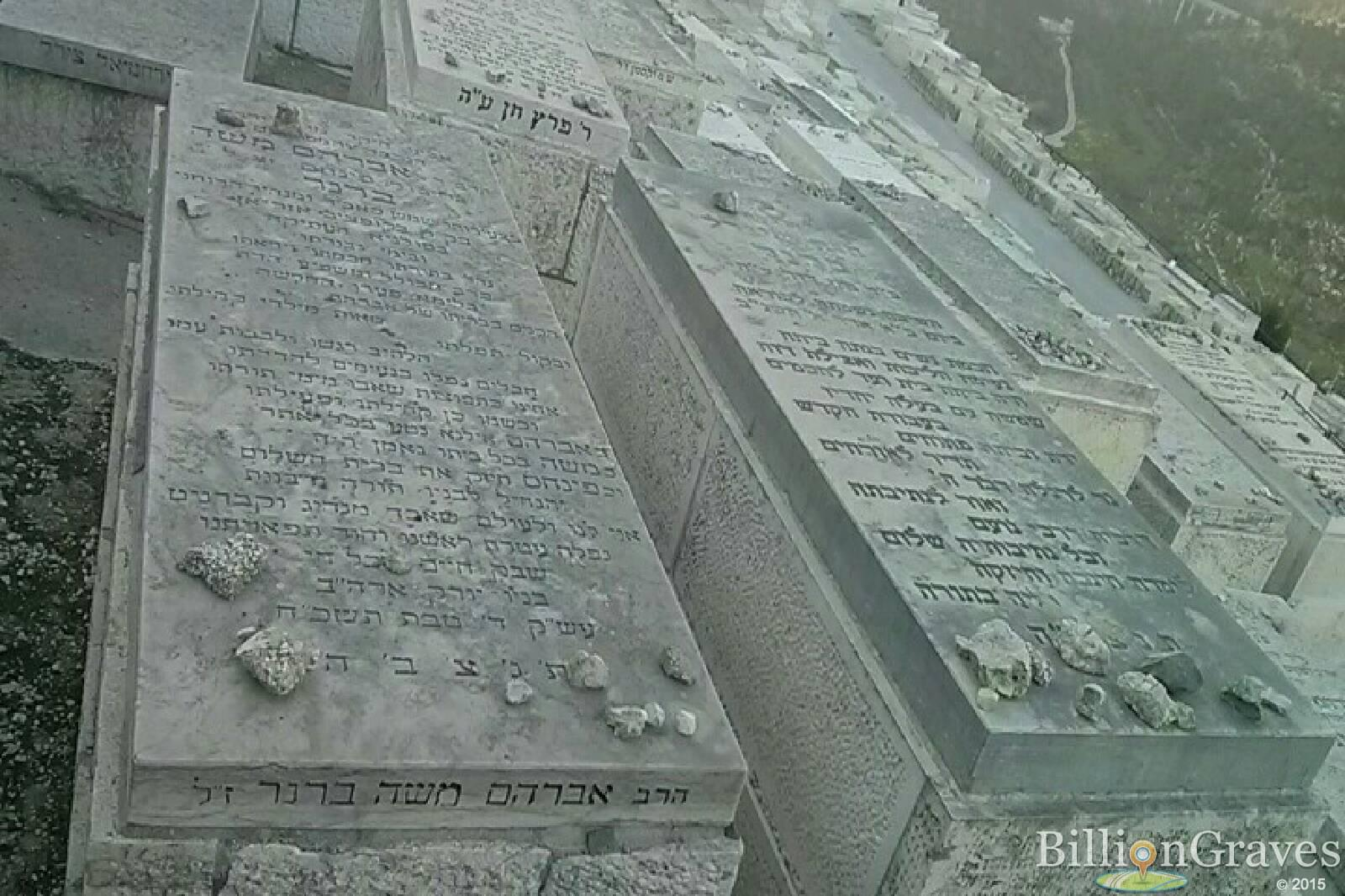
Grave of Rabbi Abraham Moshe Brener, Har Hamenuchot, Jerusalem, Israel.

== Family ==
Abraham Moshe Brener is the father of Rabbi Pynchas Brener, the former Chief Rabbi of Venezuela and current ambassador of Venezuela to Israel (as appointed by Juan Guaido). Abraham Moshe Brener died in New York on January 5, 1968 (4 Tevet 5728) and is buried in Israel.
