= List of ambassadors of Peru to Israel =

Coordinates: 32.166610°N 34.810846°E

Ambassador of Peru to Israel
- Embajador del Perú en Tel Aviv
- Coat of Arms of Peru
- Inaugural holder: Mario Sosa Pardo de Zela
- Formation: August 20, 1957
- Website: Embassy Page

The Peruvian ambassador to Israel is the ambassador of the Peruvian government to the government of Israel.

Peru has an embassy in Tel Aviv and Israel has an embassy in Lima. While Palestine also has an embassy in Lima, Peru does not have a representation in Ramallah or any other city in the country, although former president Pedro Castillo announced the intention of the country to open an embassy in 2022.

== List of representatives ==
Diplomatic accreditation	Ambassador	Observations	List of presidents of Peru	List of presidents of Israel	Term end
August 20, 1957	Mario Sosa Pardo de Zela	with residence in Vienna.	Manuel Prado y Ugarteche	Yitzhak Ben-Zvi	
March 1, 1963	Julio Balbuena Camino		Nicolás Lindley López	Zalman Shazar	
1964	José Larrabure Price		Fernando Belaude	Zalman Shazar	
1966	José Francisco Mariátegui Parodi	30 Jul 1902, Callao, Peru; DEATH: 19 Aug 1974, Lima	Fernando Belaude	Zalman Shazar	
1967	Felipe Portocarreo Olave		Fernando Belaunde	Zalman Shazar	
1970	Victor Odicio Tamáriz		Juan Velasco Alvarado	Zalman Shazar	
1971	Rafael Sánchez Aizcorbe		Juan Velasco Alvarado	Zalman Shazar	
1973	Bernardo Roca Rey		Juan Velasco Alvarado	Ephraim Katzir	
1980	Alejandro San Martín Caro		Fernando Belaúnde Terry	Yitzhak Navon	
1983	Miguel Barandarián Barandarián		Fernando Belaúnde Terry	Chaim Herzog	
1986	Guillermo Fernández-Cornejo Cortes	He also served as first ambassador to Cyprus from June 12, 1988, presenting his credentials on September 2.	Alán García Pérez	Chaim Herzog	
June 1, 1989	Hugo de Zela Hurtado		Alán García Pérez	Chaim Herzog	
1992	Jorge Torres Aciego	in 1991, Defense Minister	Alberto Fujimori	Chaim Herzog	
December 14, 1995	Carlos Jaime Marcos Stiglich Bérninzon		Alberto Fujimori	Ezer Weizman	
July 28, 1999	Nicolás Alfonso Roncagliolo Higueras	Nacido en Lima en 1949, Cuarta exposición Emb .	Alberto Fujimori	Ezer Weizman	
December 21, 2004	Juan Antonio Velit Granda		Alejandro Toledo Manrique	Moshe Katsav	
December 21, 2005	Luis Gilberto Mendivil Canales		Alejandro Toledo Manrique	Moshe Katsav	
July 8, 2009	José Luis Salinas Montes		Alan García	Shimon Peres	
December 4, 2014	Gustavo Antonio Otero Zapata		Ollanta Humala	Reuven Rivlin	
February 9, 2016	Alfredo Raúl Chuquihuara Chil		Pedro Pablo Kuczynski	Reuven Rivlin	February 8, 2017
May 16, 2019	Carlos Daniel Chavez-Taffur Schmidt		Martín Vizcarra	Reuven Rivlin	November 9, 2020
July 11, 2024	Javier Martin Sanchez-Checa				October 10, 2025
