= South Sea Company coinage =

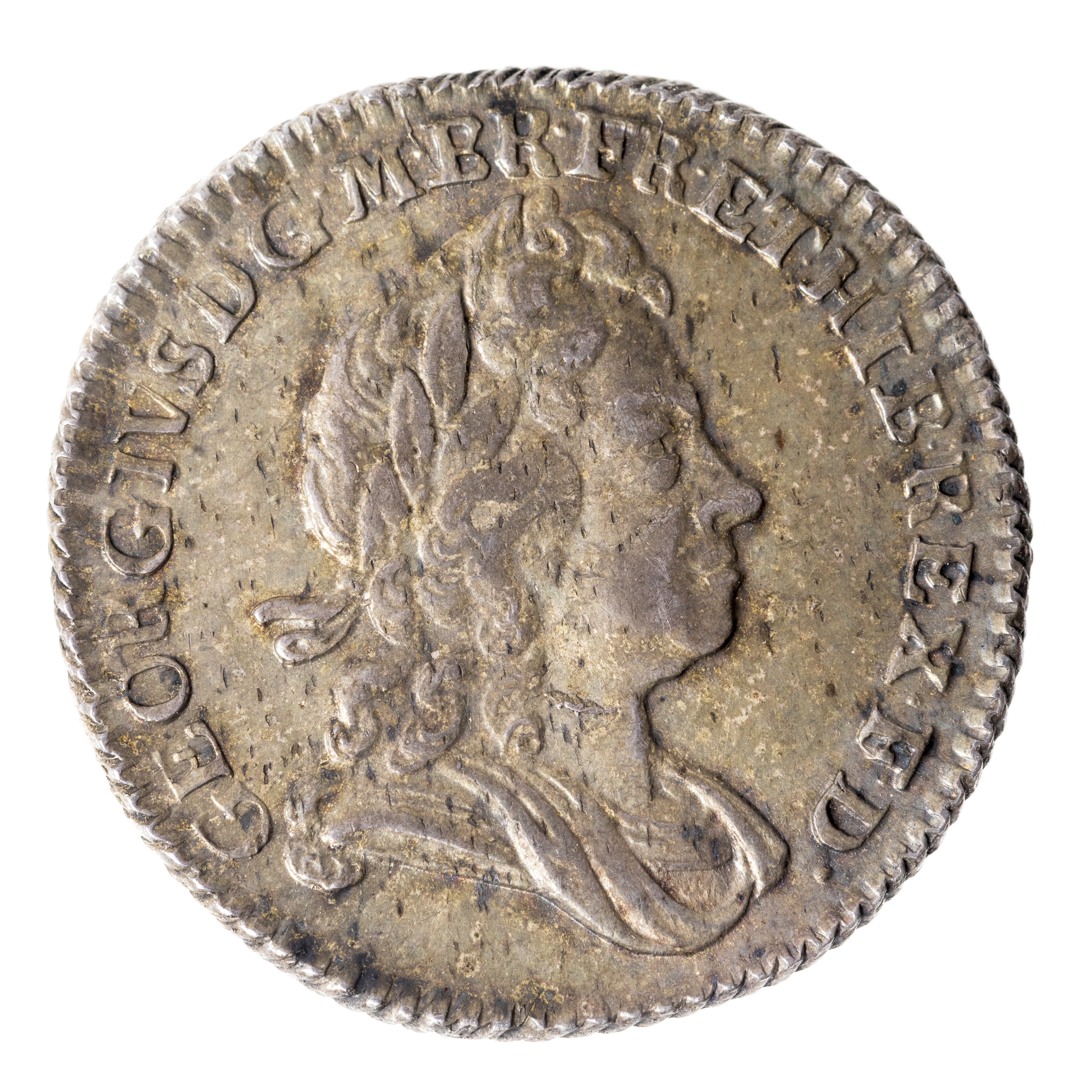
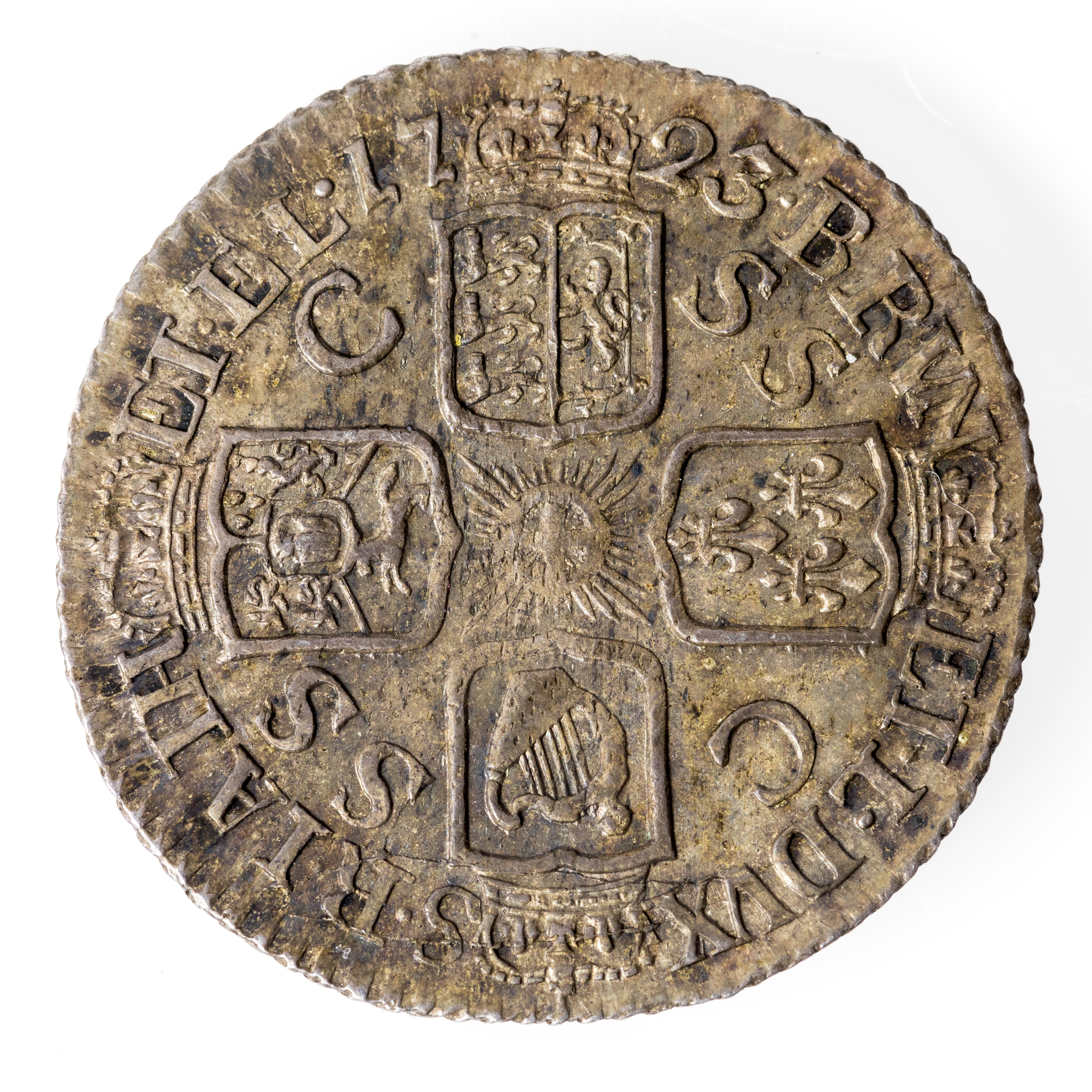
An SSC sixpence

Coinage of the South Sea Company was minted in Britain in 1723 on the basis of two significant arrivals of silver. The first was silver which the South Sea Company (SSC) discovered in (and shipped back from) Indonesia in 1722. The second, more important in volume, was the return from Cartagena of the "Royal George" "carrying about 25 tons of silver – in the form of about one million pieces of eight...." On the basis of this South American silver, acquired through the Asiento Slave Trade, and the collateral trades in commodities which surrounded it, around £100,000 of coins were minted as Crowns, Half Crowns, Shillings and Sixpences. The Crown is the rarest of them, although the Half-Crown is also difficult to find in higher than VF conditions. The shilling is common, with even mint state examples being easily found. The sixpence is common in most grades, though mint condition ones are rare. All these coins carry "SSC" in the reverse quarters of the cruciform shields.

Several die errors and corrections of interest exist on the shilling, including the slightly scarce error SS/C where an engraver accidentally punched the C in the wrong place and then stamped the SS over it. On these pieces, you can see a faint C under the SS. There is also a far rarer variety, which catalogues near £100 in F condition, where the whole collection of shields is rotated.

== Bibliography ==
- Birch, Graham (2020). "The South Sea Bubble – The Instigator of the Notorious Bubble". The Metal in Britain's Coins. London: Spink & Son. p. 70-82. ISBN 978-1-912667-43-7.
- and "The “Tercentenary” of the South Sea Company “SSC” silver coins

approaches. Where the silver came from and how it got here." https://britnumsoc.blog/2022/10/19/the-tercentenary-of-the-south-sea-company-ssc-silver-coins-approaches-where-the-silver-came-from-and-how-it-got-here-graham-birch/
