= South Sea Company =

18th-century British company involved in a major financial scandal

- Arms of the South Sea Company: Azure, a globe whereon are represented the Straits of Magellan and Cape Horn all proper and in sinister chief point two herrings haurient in saltire argent crowned or, in a canton the united arms of Great Britain
- Type: Public
- Industry: Slave trade, speculation, whaling
- Founded: January 1711; 315 years ago
- Defunct: 1853; 173 years ago
- Headquarters: London, Great Britain

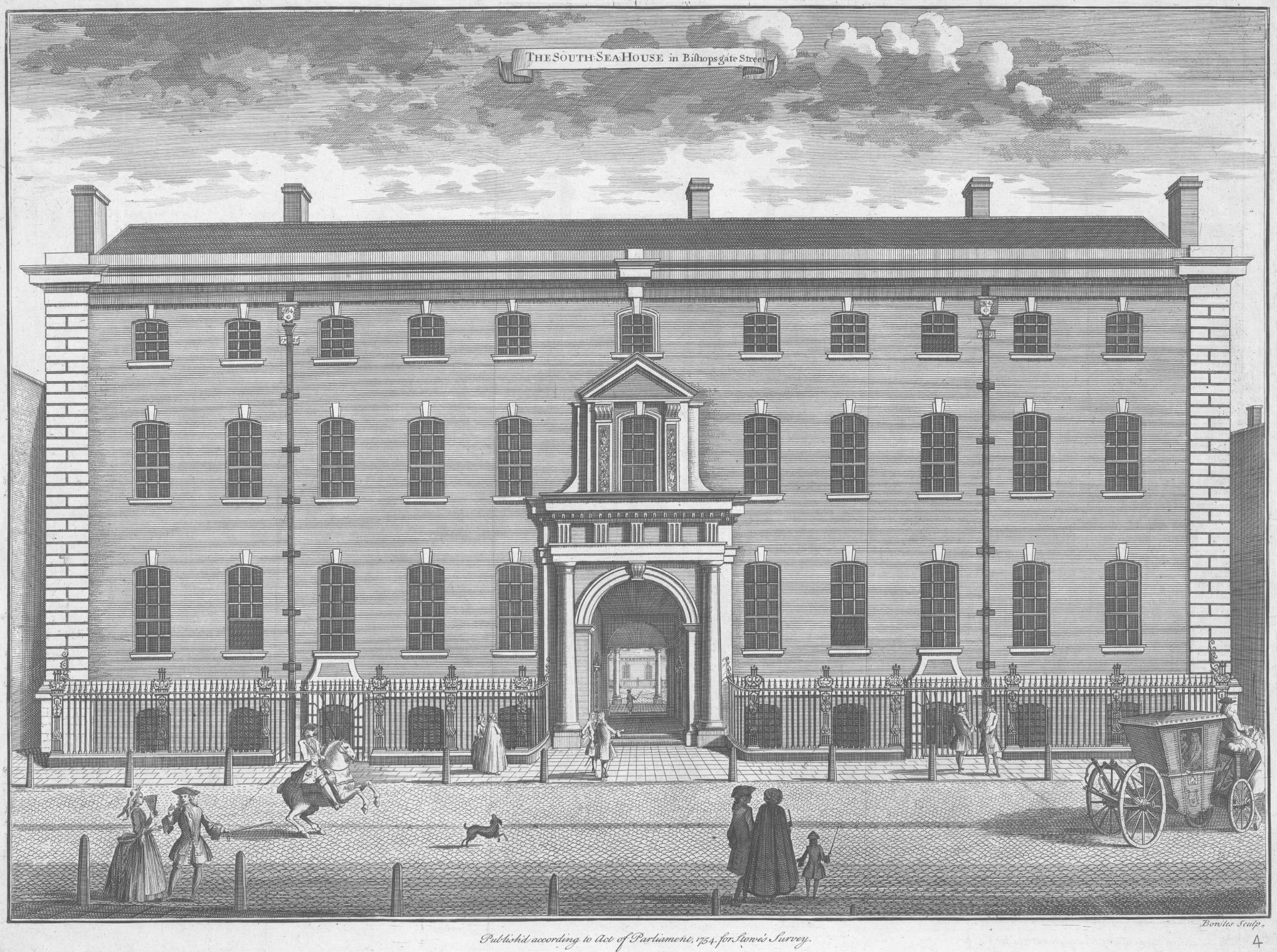
1754 engraving of Old South Sea House, the headquarters of the South Sea Company, which burned down in 1826, on the corner of Bishopsgate Street and Threadneedle Street in the City of London

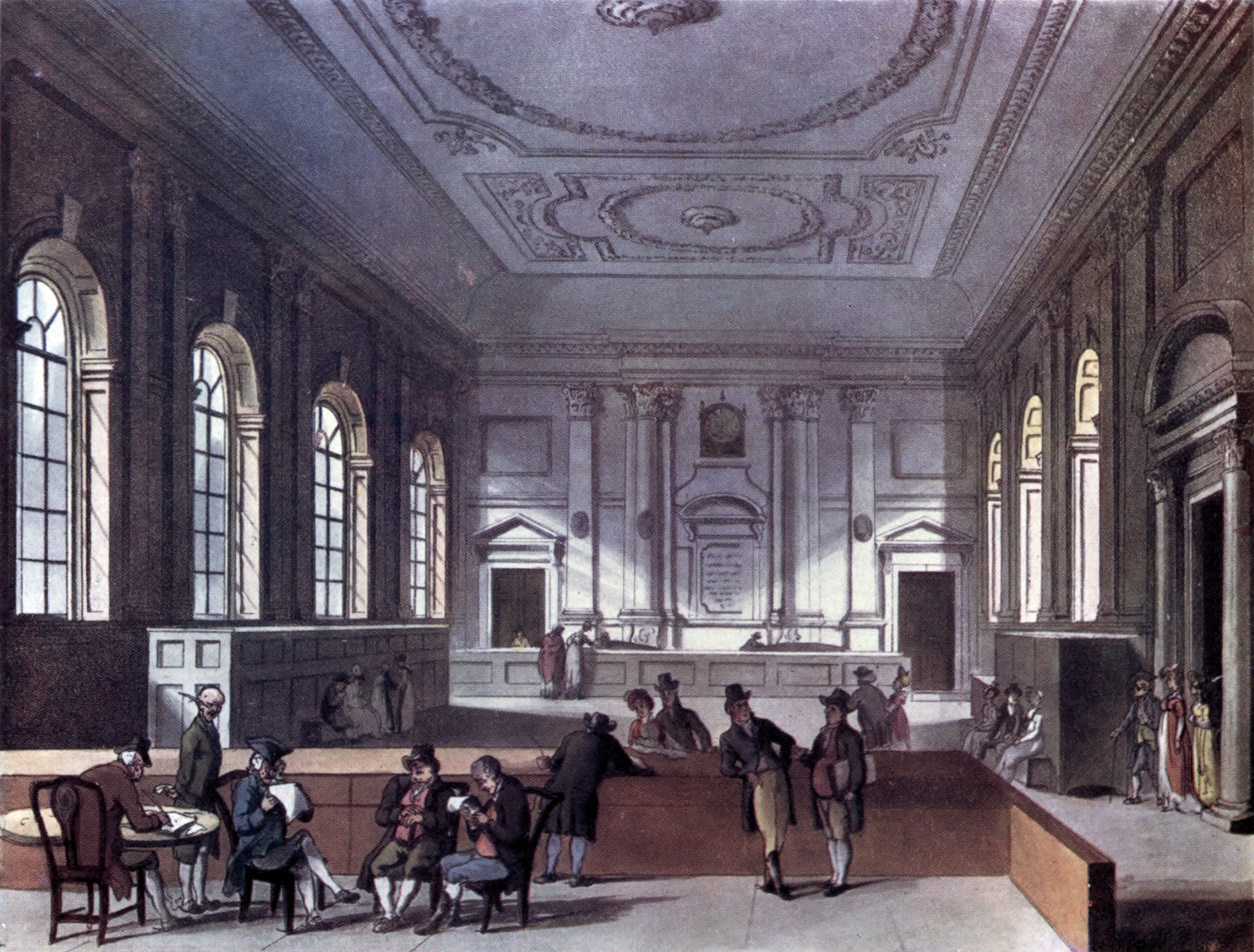
The Dividend Hall of South Sea House, 1810

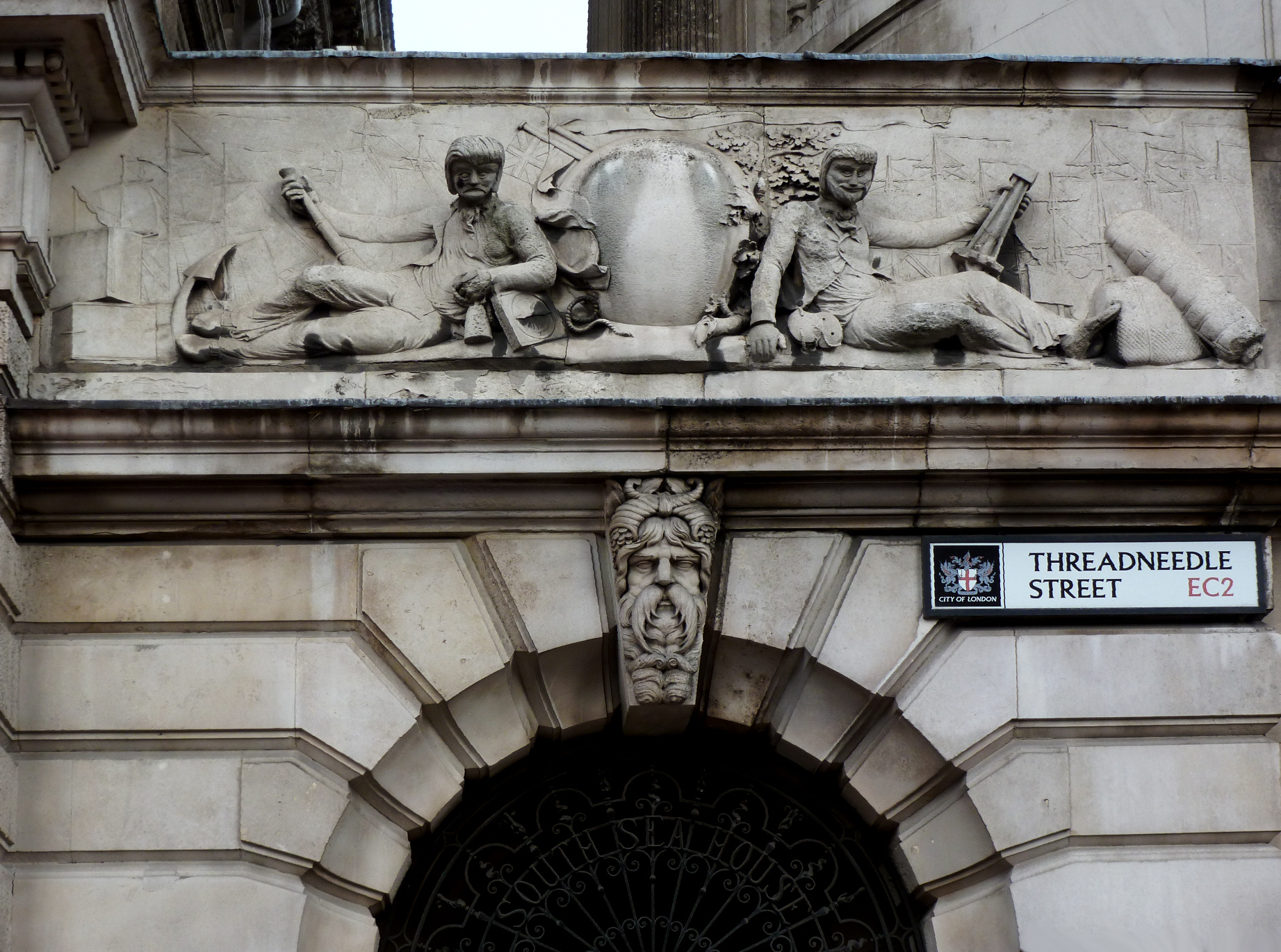
Heraldic grouping above main entrance to the surviving South Sea House, Threadneedle Street, rebuilt after the fire of 1826

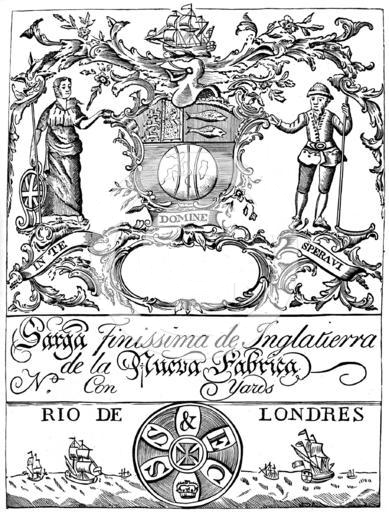
An early trade label of the South Sea Company, for export of finest English serge cloth. The letters circumscribing the seal below should read "SS&FC", for "South Sea and Fishery Company"

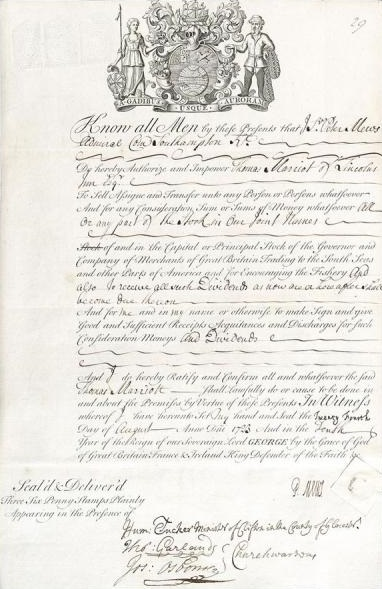
1723 pro-forma power of attorney signed by a shareholder of the South Sea Company showing the company's coat of arms and the Latin motto A Gadibus usque Auroram ("From Cádiz to Dawn", Juvenal, Satires, 10)

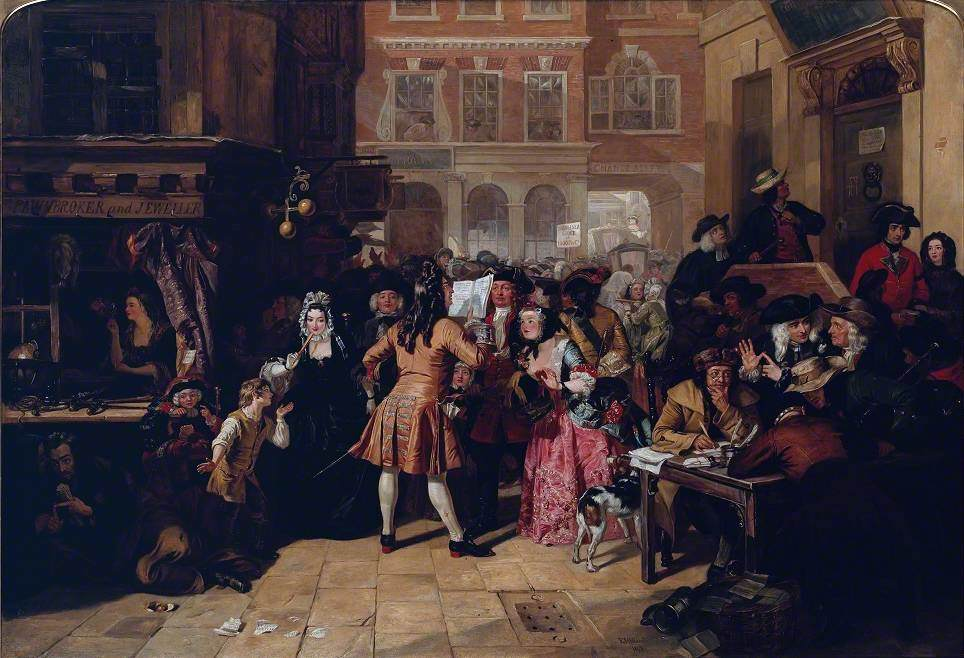
The South Sea Bubble by Edward Matthew Ward, 1847. A Hogarthian image of the 1720 "South Sea Bubble" now in the Tate Britain

The South Sea Company (Note: Officially The governor and company of merchants of Great Britain trading to the South-Seas and other parts of America, and for encouraging the fishery, with occasional variations.) was a British joint-stock company founded in January 1711, created as a public-private partnership to consolidate and reduce the cost of the national debt. To generate income, in 1713 the company was granted a monopoly (the Asiento de Negros) to supply enslaved Africans to the islands in the "South Seas" and South America, which led to it transporting over 34,000 people across the Atlantic during its operations. When the company was created, Britain was involved in the War of the Spanish Succession and Spain and Portugal controlled most of South America. There was thus no realistic prospect that trade would take place, and as it turned out, the Company never realised any significant profit from its monopoly. However, Company stock rose greatly in value as it expanded its operations dealing in government debt, and peaked in 1720 before suddenly collapsing to little above its original flotation price. The notorious economic bubble this created, which ruined thousands of investors, became known as the South Sea Bubble.

The Bubble Act 1720 (6 Geo. 1 c. 18), which forbade the creation of joint-stock companies without royal charter, was promoted by the South Sea Company itself before its collapse.

In Great Britain, many investors were ruined by the share-price collapse, and as a result, the national economy diminished substantially. The founders of the scheme engaged in insider trading, by using their advance knowledge of the timings of national debt consolidations to make large profits from purchasing debt in advance. Huge bribes were given to politicians to support the acts of Parliament necessary for the scheme. Company money was used to deal in its own shares, and selected individuals purchasing shares were given cash loans backed by those same shares to spend on purchasing more shares. The expectation of profits from trade with South America was talked up to encourage the public to purchase shares, but the bubble prices reached far beyond what the actual profits of the business (namely the slave trade) could justify.

A parliamentary inquiry was held after the bursting of the bubble to discover its causes. A number of politicians were disgraced, and people found to have profited unlawfully from the company had personal assets confiscated proportionate to their gains (most had already been rich and remained so). Finally, the company was restructured and continued to operate for more than a century after the Bubble. The headquarters were in Threadneedle Street at the centre of the City of London, the financial district of the capital. At the time of these events, the Bank of England was also a private company dealing in national debt, and the crash of its rival confirmed its position as banker to the British government.

== Foundation ==
When in August 1710 Robert Harley was appointed Chancellor of the Exchequer, the government had already become reliant on the Bank of England, a privately owned company chartered 16 years previously, which had obtained a monopoly as the lender to the government. The government had become dissatisfied with the service it was receiving and Harley was actively seeking new ways to improve the national finances.

A new parliament met in November 1710 resolved to attend to the national finances, which were suffering from the pressures of two simultaneous wars: the War of the Spanish Succession with France, which ended in 1713, and the Great Northern War, which was not to end until 1721. Harley came prepared, with detailed accounts describing the situation of the national debt, which was customarily a piecemeal arrangement, with each government department borrowing independently as the need arose. He released the information steadily, continually adding new reports of debts incurred and scandalous expenditure, until in January 1711 the House of Commons agreed to appoint a committee to investigate the entire debt. The committee included Harley himself, the two Auditors of the Imprests (whose task was to investigate government spending), Edward Harley (the Chancellor's brother), Paul Foley (the Chancellor's brother-in-law), the Secretary of the Treasury, William Lowndes (who had had significant responsibility for reminting the entire debased British coinage in 1696) and John Aislabie (who represented the October Club, a group of about 200 MPs who had agreed to vote together).

Harley's first concern was to find £300,000 for the next quarter's payroll for the British army operating on the Continent under the Duke of Marlborough. This funding was provided by a private consortium of Edward Gibbon (grandfather of the historian), George Caswall, and Hoare's Bank. The Bank of England had been operating a lottery on behalf of the government, but in 1710 this had produced less revenue than expected and another begun in 1711 was also performing poorly; Harley granted the authority to sell tickets to John Blunt, a director of the Hollow Sword Blade Company, which despite its name was an unofficial bank. Sales commenced on 3 March 1711 and tickets had completely sold out by 7 March, making it the first truly successful English state lottery.

The success was shortly followed by another larger lottery, "The Two Million Adventure" or "The Classis", with tickets costing £100, with a top prize of £20,000 and every ticket winning a prize of at least £10. Although prizes were advertised by their total value, they were in fact paid out by instalments in the form of a fixed annuity over a period of years, so that the government effectively held the prize money as borrowings until the whole value had been paid out to the winners. Marketing was handled by members of the Sword Blade syndicate, Gibbon selling £200,000 of tickets and earning £4,500 commission, and Blunt selling £993,000. Charles Blunt (a relative) was made Paymaster of the lottery with expenses of £5,000.

=== Conception of the company ===
The national debt investigation concluded that a total of £9 million was owed by the government, with no specifically allocated income to pay it off. Robert Harley and John Blunt had jointly devised a scheme to consolidate this debt in much the same way that the Bank of England had consolidated previous debts, although the Bank still held the monopoly for operating as a bank. All holders of the debt (creditors) would be required to surrender it to a new company formed for the purpose, the South Sea Company, which in return would issue them shares in itself to the same nominal value. The government would make an annual payment to the Company of £568,279, equating to 6% interest plus expenses, which would then be redistributed to the shareholders as a dividend. The company was also granted a monopoly to trade with South America, a potentially lucrative enterprise, but one controlled by Spain – with which Britain was at war.

At that time, when the continent of America was being explored and colonised, Europeans applied the term "South Seas" only to South America and surrounding waters. The concession both held out the potential for future profits and encouraged a desire for an end to the war, necessary if any profits were to be made. The original suggestion for the South Sea scheme came from William Paterson, one of the founders of the Bank of England and of the financially disastrous Darien Scheme.

Harley was rewarded for delivering the scheme by being created Earl of Oxford on 23 May 1711 and was promoted to Lord High Treasurer. With a more secure position, he began secret peace negotiations with France.

=== Initial speculation ===
The scheme to thus consolidate all government debt and to manage it better in the future held out the prospect of all existing creditors being repaid the full nominal value of their loans, which at the time before the scheme was publicised were valued at a discounted rate of £55 per £100 nominal value, as the lotteries were discredited. The government's ability to repay in full was widely doubted. Thus bonds representing the debt intended to be consolidated under the scheme were available for purchase on the open market at a price that allowed anyone with advance knowledge to buy and resell in the immediate future at a high profit, for as soon as the scheme became publicised the bonds would once again be worth at least their nominal value, as repayment was now more certain a prospect. This anticipation of gain made it possible for Harley to bring further financial supporters into the scheme, such as James Bateman and Theodore Janssen.

Daniel Defoe commented:

Unless the Spaniards are to be divested of common sense, infatuate, and given up, abandoning their own commerce, throwing away the only valuable stake they have left in the world, and in short, bent on their own ruin, we cannot suggest that they will ever, on any consideration, or for any equivalent, part with so valuable, indeed so inestimable a jewel, as the exclusive trade to their own plantations.

— An Essay on the South-Sea Trade

The originators of the scheme knew that there was no money to invest in a trading venture, and no realistic expectation that there would ever be a trade to exploit, but nevertheless, the potential for great wealth was widely publicised at every opportunity, so as to encourage interest in the scheme. The founders' objective was to create a company that would enable them to become wealthy and offer opportunities for further government contracts.

=== Flotation ===
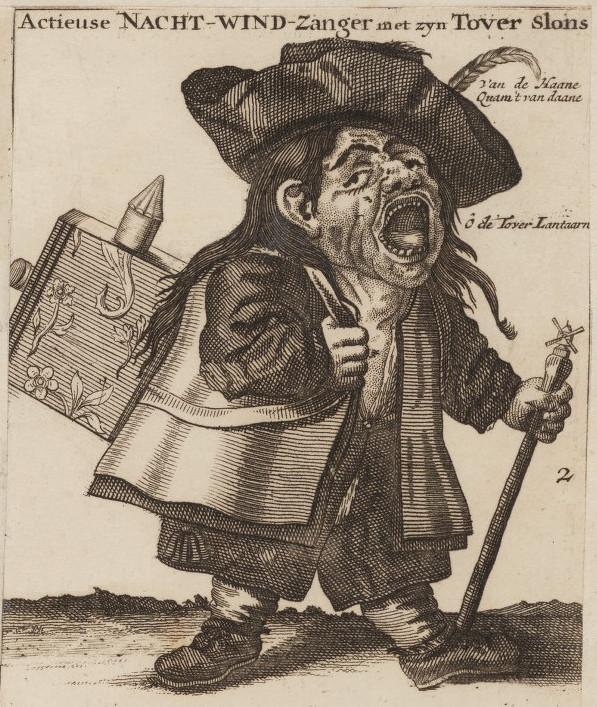
A bubble-era stock promoter, caricatured as a "night wind hawker" (The Great Picture of Folly, 1720)

The royal charter for the company, based on that of the Bank of England, was drawn up by Blunt who was paid £3,846 for his services in setting up the company. Directors would be elected every three years and shareholders would meet twice a year. The company employed a cashier, secretary and accountant. The governor was intended as an honorary position, and was later customarily held by the monarch. The charter allowed the full court of directors - the managing body - to nominate a smaller committee to act on any matter on its behalf. Directors of the Bank of England and of the East India Company were barred from being directors of the South Sea Company. Any ship of more than 500 tons owned by the company was to have a Church of England clergyman on board.

The surrender of government debt for company stock was to occur in five lots. The first two of these, totalling £2.75 million from about 200 large investors, had already been arranged before the company's charter was issued on 10 September 1711. The government surrendered £0.75 million of its debt held by different departments (at that time individual office holders were at liberty to invest government funds under their control to their own advantage before it was required for government expenditure). Harley surrendered £8,000 of debt and was appointed Governor of the new company. Blunt, Caswall and Sawbridge together surrendered £65,000, Janssen £25,000 of his own plus £250,000 from a foreign consortium, Decker £49,000, Sir Ambrose Crawley £36,791. The company had a Sub-Governor, Bateman; a Deputy Governor, Ongley; and 30 ordinary directors. Nine of the directors were politicians, five were members of the Sword Blade consortium, and seven more were financial magnates who had been attracted to the scheme.

The company created a coat of arms with the motto A Gadibus usque ad Auroram ("From Cádiz to Dawn", from Juvenal, Satires, 10) and rented a large house in the City of London as its headquarters. Seven sub-committees were created to handle its everyday business, the most important being the "committee for the affairs of the company". The Sword Blade company was retained as the company's banker and on the strength of its new government connections issued notes in its own right, notwithstanding the Bank of England's monopoly. The task of the Company Secretary was to oversee trading activities; the Accountant, Grigsby, was responsible for registering and issuing stock; and the Cashier, Robert Knight, acted as Blunt's personal assistant at a salary of £200 per annum.

=== The slave trade ===
Under the Treaty of Tordesillas, Spain was the only European power that could not establish factories in Africa to purchase slaves. The slaves for Spanish America were provided by companies that were granted exclusive rights to their trade. This monopoly contract was called the slave Asiento. Between 1701 and 1713 the Asiento contract was granted to France. In 1711 Britain had created the South Sea Company to reduce debt and to trade with Spanish America, but that commerce was illegal without a permit from Spain, and the only existing permit was the Asiento for the slave trade, so at the Treaty of Utrecht in 1713 Britain obtained the transfer of the Asiento contract from French to British hands for the next 30 years, to be administered by the South Sea Company.

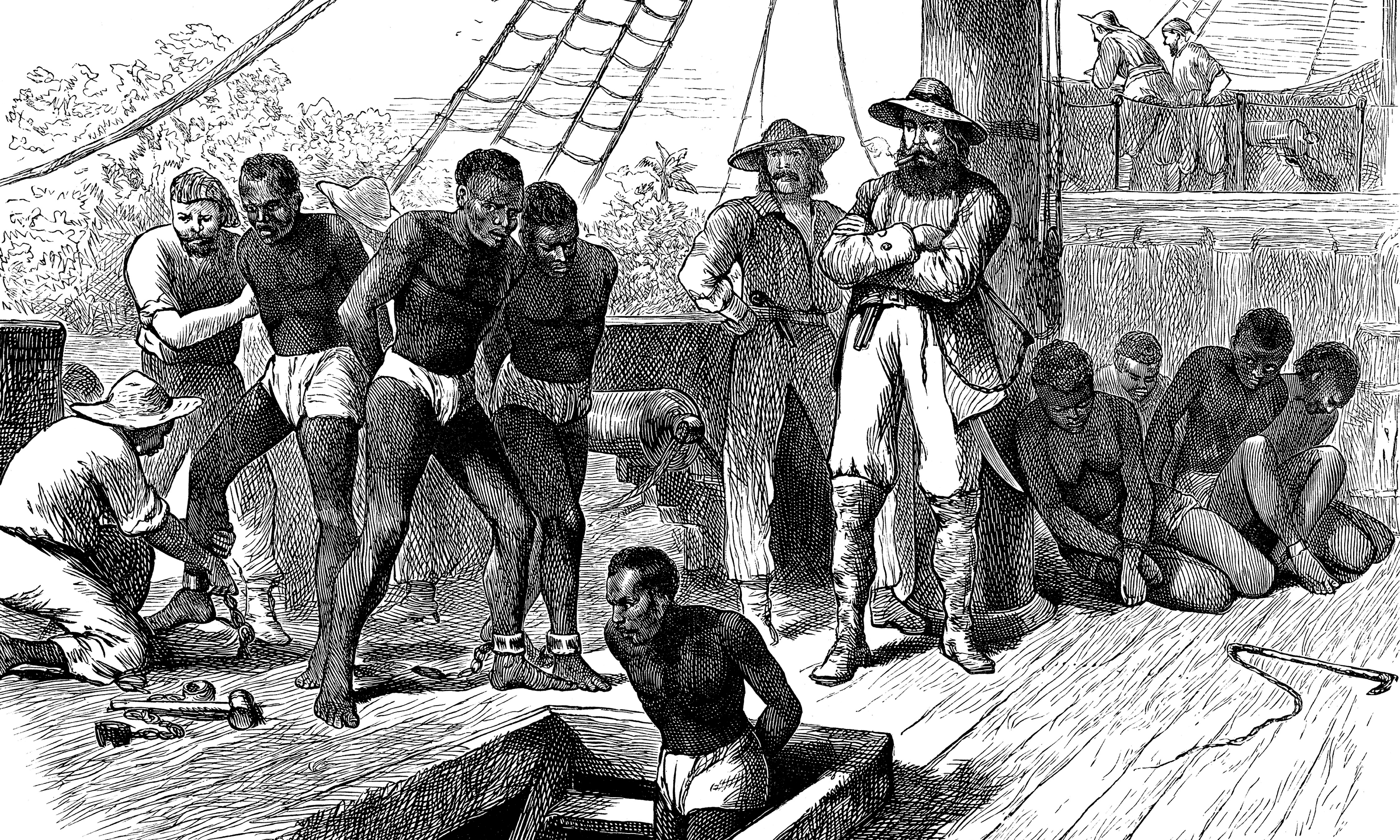
African slaves taken aboard a slave ship

The company was contracted to supply 4,800 enslaved Africans ("slaves") per year to the Spanish colonies. Britain was permitted to open offices in Buenos Aires, Caracas, Cartagena, Havana, Panama, Portobello and Veracruz to arrange the Atlantic slave trade. One ship of no more than 500 tons could be sent to one of these places each year (the Navío de Permiso) with general trade goods. One quarter of the profits were to be reserved for the King of Spain. There was provision for two extra sailings at the start of the contract. The Asiento was granted in the name of Queen Anne and then contracted to the company.

By July the company had arranged contracts with the Royal African Company to supply the African slaves to Jamaica. Ten pounds was paid for a slave aged over 16, £8 for one under 16 but over 10. Two-thirds were to be male, and 90 per cent adult. The company transported 1,230 slaves from Jamaica to America in the first year, plus any that might have been added (against standing instructions) by the ship's captains on their own behalf. On arrival of the first cargoes, the local authorities refused to accept the Asiento, which had still not been officially confirmed there by the Spanish authorities. The slaves were eventually sold at a loss in the West Indies.

In 1714 the government announced that a quarter of profits would be reserved for Queen Anne and a further 7.5 per cent for a financial adviser, Manasseh Gilligan. Some company board members refused to accept the contract on these terms, and the government was obliged to reverse its decision. Despite these setbacks, the company continued, having raised £200,000 to finance the operations. In 1714 2,680 slaves were carried, and for 1716–1717, 13,000 more, but the trade continued to be unprofitable. An import duty of 33 pieces of eight was charged on each slave (although for this purpose some slaves might be counted only as a fraction of a slave, depending on quality). One of the extra trade ships was sent to Cartagena in 1714 carrying woollen goods, despite warnings that there was no market for them there, and they remained unsold for two years.

=== Changes of management ===
The company was dependent on the goodwill of the government; when the government changed, so too did the company board. In 1714 one of the directors who had been sponsored by Harley, Arthur Moore, had attempted to send 60 tons of private goods on board the company ship. He was dismissed as a director, but the result was the beginning of Harley's fall from favour with the company. On 27 July 1714, Harley was replaced as Lord High Treasurer as a result of a disagreement that had broken out within the Tory faction in Parliament. Queen Anne died on 1 August 1714 and at the election of directors in 1715 the Prince of Wales (the future King George II) was elected as governor of the company. The new King George I and the Prince of Wales both had large holdings in the company, as did some prominent Whig politicians, including James Craggs the Elder, the Earl of Halifax and Sir Joseph Jekyll. Craggs, as Postmaster General, was responsible for intercepting mail on behalf of the government to obtain political and financial information. All Tory politicians were removed from the board and replaced with businessmen. The Whigs Horatio Townshend, brother in law of Robert Walpole and the Duke of Argyll were elected directors.

The change of government led to a revival of the company's share value, which had fallen below its issue price. The previous government had failed to make the interest payments to the company for the preceding two years, owing more than £1 million. The new administration insisted that the debt be written off, but allowed the company to issue new shares to stock holders to the value of the missed payments. At around £10 million, this now represented half the share capital issued in the entire country. In 1714 the company had 2,000 to 3,000 shareholders, more than either of its rivals.

By the time of the next directors' elections in 1718 a schism within the Whigs between Walpole's faction supporting the Prince of Wales and James Stanhope's supporting the King. Argyll and Townshend were dismissed as directors, as were the surviving Tories Sir Richard Hoare and George Pitt, and King George I became governor. Four MPs remained directors, as did six people holding government financial offices. The Sword Blade Company remained bankers to the South Sea and had flourished despite the company's dubious legal position. Blunt and Sawbridge remained South Sea directors, and they had been joined by Gibbon and Child. Caswall had retired as a South Sea director to concentrate on the Sword Blade business. In November 1718 Sub-Governor Bateman and Deputy Governor Shepheard both died. Leaving aside the honorary position of Governor, this left the company suddenly without its two most senior and experienced directors. They were replaced by Sir John Fellowes as Sub-Governor and Charles Joye as Deputy.

=== War ===
In 1718 war broke out with Spain once again, in the War of the Quadruple Alliance. The company's assets in South America were seized, at a cost claimed by the company to be £300,000. Any prospect of profit from trade, for which the company had purchased ships and had been planning its next ventures, disappeared.

== Refinancing government debt ==
Events in France now came to influence the future of the company. A Scottish economist and financier, John Law, exiled after killing a man in a duel, had travelled around Europe before settling in France. There he founded a bank, which in December 1718 became the Banque Royale, national bank of France, while Law himself was granted sweeping powers to control the economy of France, which operated largely by royal decree. Law's remarkable success was known in financial circles throughout Europe, and came to inspire Blunt and his associates to make greater efforts to grow their own concerns.

In February 1719 Craggs explained to the House of Commons a new scheme for improving the national debt by converting the annuities issued after the 1710 lottery into South Sea stock. By an act of Parliament, the National Debt Act 1719 (6 Geo. 1. c. 4), the company was granted the right to issue £1,150 of new stock for every £100 per annum of annuity which was surrendered. The government would pay 5 per cent per annum on the stock created, which would halve their annual bill. The conversion was voluntary, amounting to £2.5 million new stock if all converted. The company was to make an additional new loan to the government pro rata up to £750,000, again at 5 per cent.

In March there was an abortive attempt to restore the Old Pretender, James Edward Stuart, to the throne of Britain, with a small landing of troops in Scotland. They were defeated at the Battle of Glen Shiel on 10 June. The South Sea company presented the offer to the public in July 1719. The Sword Blade company spread a rumour that the Pretender had been captured, and the general euphoria induced the South Sea share price to rise from £100, where it had been in the spring, to £114. Annuitants were still paid out at the same money value of shares, the company keeping the profit from the rise in value before issuing. About two-thirds of the annuities were exchanged.

=== Trading more debt for equity ===
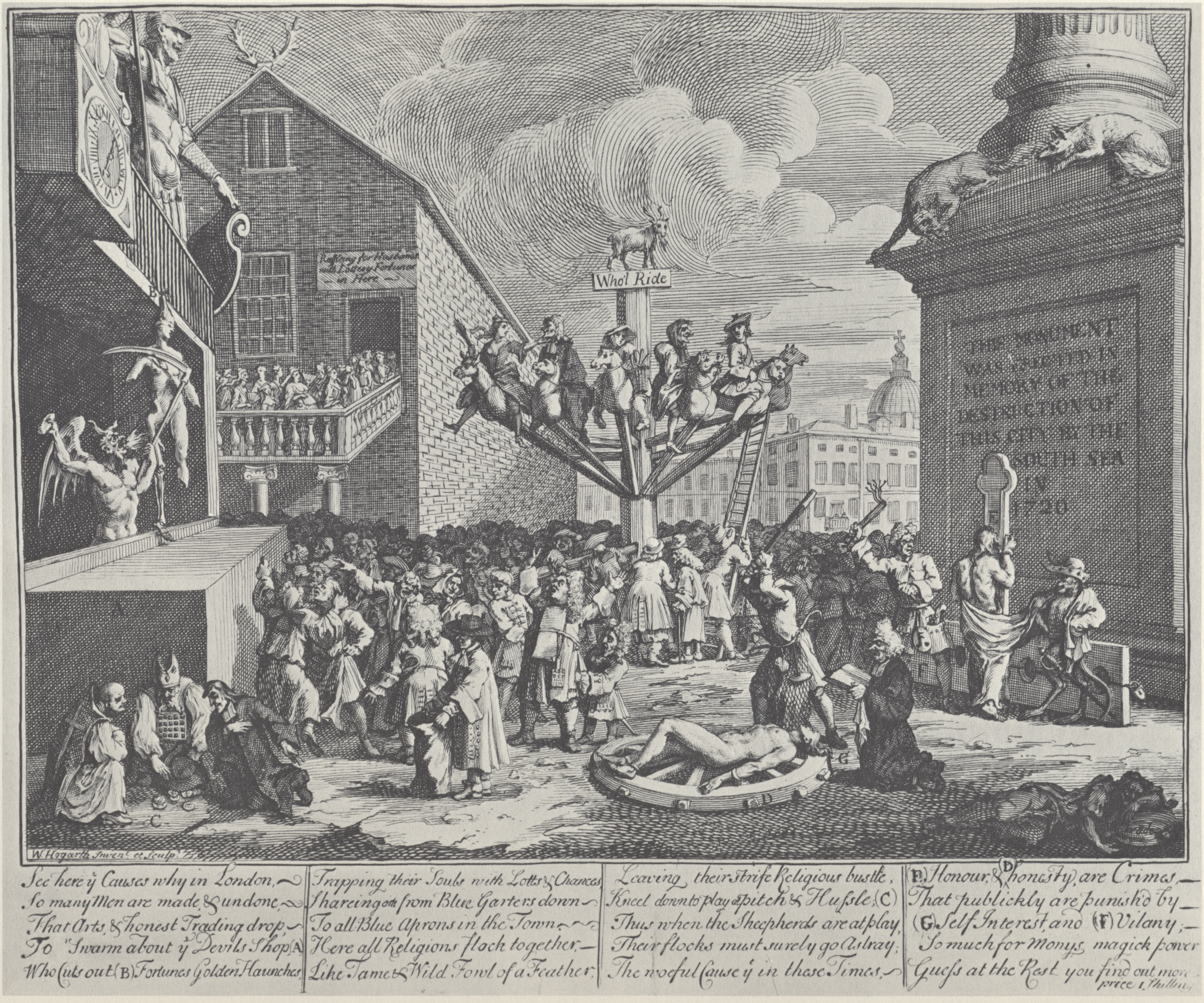
William Hogarth, Emblematical Print on the South Sea Scheme (1721). In the bottom left corner are Protestant, Catholic, and Jewish figures gambling, while in the middle there is a huge machine, like a merry-go-round, which people are boarding. At the top is a goat, written below which is "Who'l Ride". The people are scattered around the picture with a sense of disorder, while the progress of the well-dressed people towards the ride in the middle represents the foolishness of the crowd in buying stock in the South Sea Company, which spent more time issuing stock than anything else. Honor at left is dismembered; Honesty in center is broken on the wheel and at lower right trade lies dead.

The 1719 scheme was a distinct success for the government and they sought to repeat it. Negotiations took place between Aislabie and Craggs for the government and Blunt, Cashier Knight and his assistant and Caswell. Janssen, the Sub Governor and Deputy Governor were also consulted but negotiations remained secret from most of the company. News from France was of fortunes being made investing in Law's bank, whose shares had risen sharply. Money was moving around Europe, and other flotations threatened to soak up capital (two insurance schemes in December 1719 each sought to raise £3 million).

Plans were made for a new scheme to take over most of the unconsolidated national debt of Britain (£30,981,712) in exchange for company shares. Annuities were valued as a lump sum necessary to produce the annual income over the original term at an assumed interest of 5 per cent, which favoured those with shorter terms still to run. The government agreed to pay the same amount to the company for all the fixed-term repayable debt as it had been paying before, but after seven years the 5 per cent interest rate would fall to 4 per cent on the new annuity debt and also that assumed previously. After the first year, the company was to give the government £3 million in four quarterly instalments. New stock would be created at a face value equal to the debt, but the share price was still rising and sales of the remaining stock, i.e. the excess of the total market value of the stock over the amount of the debt, would be used to raise the government fee plus a profit for the company. The more the price rose in advance of conversion, the more the company would make. Before the scheme, payments were costing the government £1.5 million per year.

In summary, the total government debt in 1719 was £50 million:

- £18.3m was held by three large corporations:
  - £3.4m by the Bank of England
  - £3.2m by the British East India Company
  - £11.7m by the South Sea Company
- Privately held redeemable debt amounted to £16.5m
- £15m consisted of irredeemable annuities, long-fixed-term annuities of 72–87 years, and short annuities of 22 years remaining to expiry.

The purpose of this conversion was similar to the old one, debt holders and annuitants might receive less return in total, but an illiquid investment was transformed into shares that could be readily traded. Shares backed by national debt were considered a safe investment and a convenient way to hold and move money, far easier and safer than metal coins. The only alternative safe asset, land, was much harder to sell and transfer of its ownership was legally much more complex.

The government received a cash payment and lower interest on the debt and gained control over when the debt had to be repaid, which was not before seven years but then at its discretion. This avoided the risk that debt might become repayable when the government needed to borrow more, and could be forced into paying higher interest rates. The payment to the government was to be used to buy any debt not subscribed to the scheme, which although it helped the government, also helped the company by removing possibly competing securities from the market, including large holdings by the Bank of England.

Company stock was now trading at £123, so the issue amounted to an injection of £5 million of new money into a booming economy just as interest rates were falling. Gross Domestic Product (GDP) for Britain at this point was estimated as £64.4 million.

==== Public announcement ====
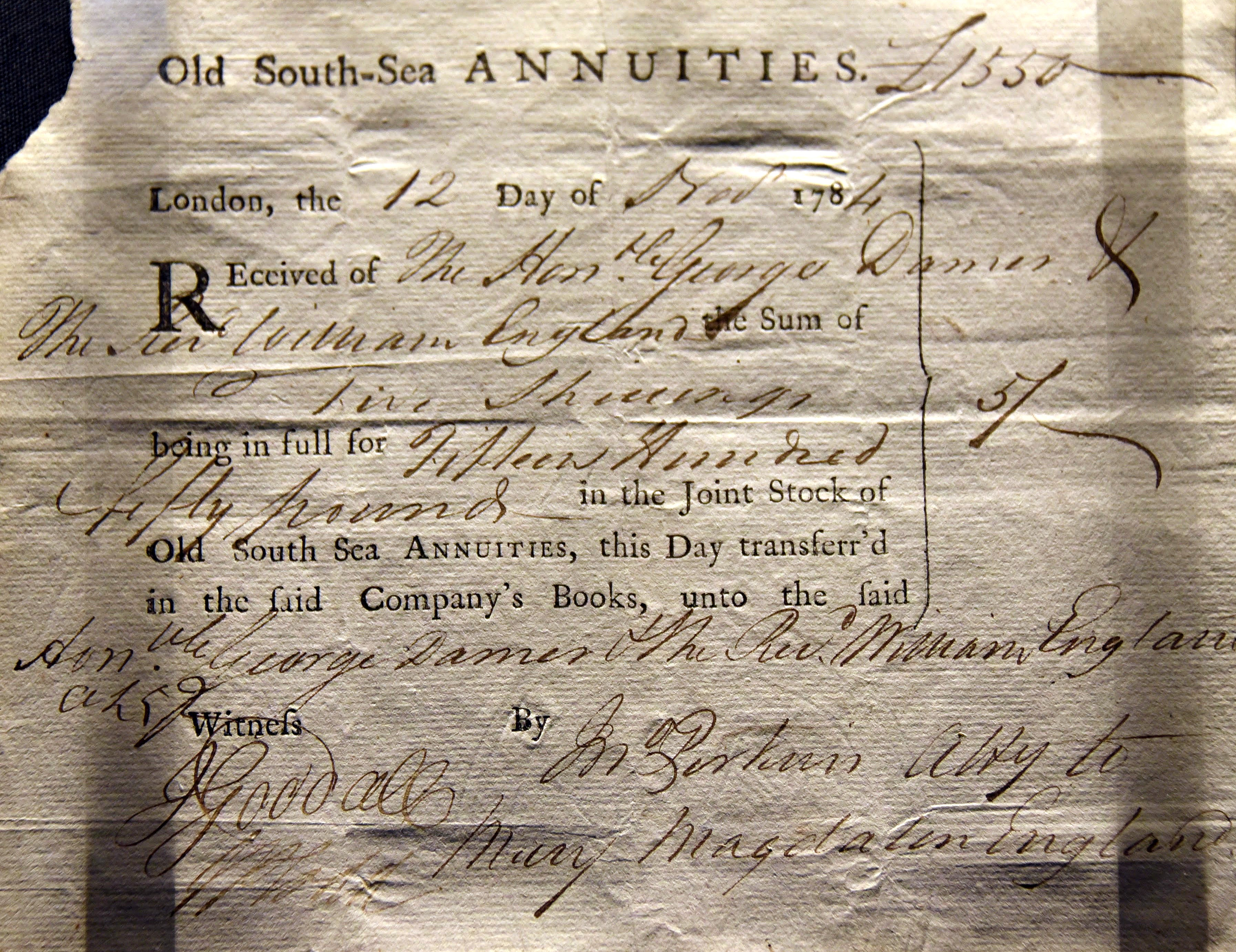
South Sea Annuities share certificate, issued 13 November 1784. On display at the British Museum in London

On 21 January the plan was presented to the board of the South Sea Company, and on 22 January Chancellor of the Exchequer John Aislabie presented it to Parliament. The House was stunned into silence but on recovering, proposed that the Bank of England should be invited to make a better offer. The South Sea increased its cash payment to £3.5 million, while the Bank proposed to undertake the conversion with a payment of £5.5 million and a fixed conversion price of £170 per £100 face-value Bank stock. On 1 February, the company negotiators led by Blunt raised their offer to £4 million plus a proportion of £3.5 million depending on how much of the debt was converted. They also agreed that the interest rate would decrease after four years instead of seven, and agreed to sell on behalf of the government £1 million of Exchequer bills (formerly handled by the Bank). The House accepted the South Sea offer and Bank stock fell sharply.

Perhaps the first sign of difficulty came when the South Sea Company announced that its Christmas 1719 dividend would be deferred for 12 months. The company embarked on a show of gratitude to its friends. Select individuals were sold a parcel of company stock at the current price. The transactions were recorded by Knight in the names of intermediaries, but no payments were received and no stock issued – the company had none to issue until the conversion of debt began. The individual received an option to sell his stock back to the company at any date at whatever market price might then apply. Shares went to the Craggs: the Elder and the Younger; Lord Gower; Lord Lansdowne; and four other MPs. Lord Sunderland would gain £500 for every pound that stock rose; George I's mistress, their children and Countess Platen £120 per pound rise, Aislabie £200 per pound, Lord Stanhope £600 per pound. Others invested money, including the Richard Hampden the Treasurer to the Navy, who invested £25,000 of government money on his behalf.

The proposal was accepted in a slightly altered form in April 1720. Crucial in this conversion was the proportion of holders of irredeemable annuities who could be tempted to convert their securities at a high price for the new shares. (Holders of redeemable debt had no other choice but to subscribe.) The South Sea Company could set the conversion price but could not diverge much from the market price of its shares. The company ultimately acquired 85 per cent of the redeemables and 80 per cent of the irredeemables.

=== Inflating the share price ===
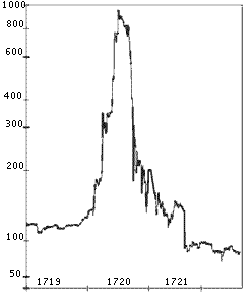
Chart of company stock prices.

The company then set to talking up its stock with "the most extravagant rumours" of the value of its potential trade in the New World; this was followed by a wave of "speculating frenzy". The share price had risen from the time the scheme was proposed, from £128 in January 1720, to £175 in February, £330 in March and following the scheme's acceptance £550 at the end of May. What may have supported the company's high multiples (its P/E ratio) was a fund of credit (known to the market) of £70 million available for commercial expansion which had been made available through substantial support, apparently, by Parliament and the King.

Shares in the company were "sold" to politicians at the market price; rather than paying for the shares, these recipients simply held the shares, with the option of selling them back to the company at any time, receiving the increase in market price. This method, as well as winning over the heads of government, the King's mistress, et al., had the advantage of binding their interests to the interests of the company, to secure profits, the stock needed to rise. By publicising the names of their elite stockholders, the company managed to clothe itself in an aura of legitimacy, which attracted and kept other buyers.

=== Bubble Act ===
The South Sea Company was by no means the only company seeking to raise money from investors in 1720. A large number of other joint-stock companies, making extravagant (sometimes fraudulent) claims about foreign or other ventures or bizarre schemes, had been created. Others represented potentially sound, although novel, schemes, such as for founding insurance companies. These were nicknamed "Bubbles". Some of the companies had no legal basis, while others (such as the Hollow Sword Blade Company, which acted as the South Sea Company's banker), used existing chartered companies for purposes different from those named at their creation. The York Buildings Company was set up to provide water to London, but was purchased by Case Billingsley who used it to purchase confiscated Jacobite estates in Scotland, which then formed the assets of an insurance company.

On 22 February 1720, John Hungerford raised the question of bubble companies in the House of Commons, and persuaded the House to set up a committee, which he chaired, to investigate. He identified a number of companies which between them sought to raise £40 million in capital. The committee investigated the companies, establishing a principle that companies should not be operating outside the objects specified in their charters. A potential embarrassment for the South Sea was avoided when the question of the Hollow Sword Blade Company arose. Difficulty was avoided by packing the committee with MPs who were supporters of the South Sea, and voting down by 75 to 25 the proposal to investigate the Hollow Sword. (At this time, committees of the House were either 'Open' or 'secret'. A secret committee was one with a fixed set of members who could vote on its proceedings. By contrast, any MP could join in with an 'open' committee and vote on its proceedings.) Stanhope, who was a member of the committee, received £50,000 of the 'resaleable' South Sea stock from Sawbridge, a director of the Hollow Sword, at about this time. Hungerford had previously been expelled from the Commons for accepting a bribe.

Amongst the bubble companies investigated were two supported by Lords Onslow and Chetwynd respectively, for insuring shipping. These were severely criticised and the questionable dealings of the Attorney-General and Solicitor-General in trying to obtain charters for the companies led to both being replaced. The schemes had the support of Walpole and Craggs, so that the larger part of the Bubble Act 1720 (6 Geo. 1. c. 18) (which resulted in June 1720 from the committee's investigations) was devoted to creating charters for the Royal Exchange Assurance Corporation or London Assurance Corporation. The companies were required to pay £300,000 for the privilege. The act required that a joint stock company could be incorporated only by act of Parliament or royal charter. The prohibition on unauthorised joint stock ventures was not repealed until 1825. The passing of the act gave a boost to the South Sea Company, its shares leaping to £890 in early June. This peak encouraged people to sell; to counterbalance this the company's directors ordered their agents to buy, which succeeded in propping the price up at around £750.

=== Top reached ===
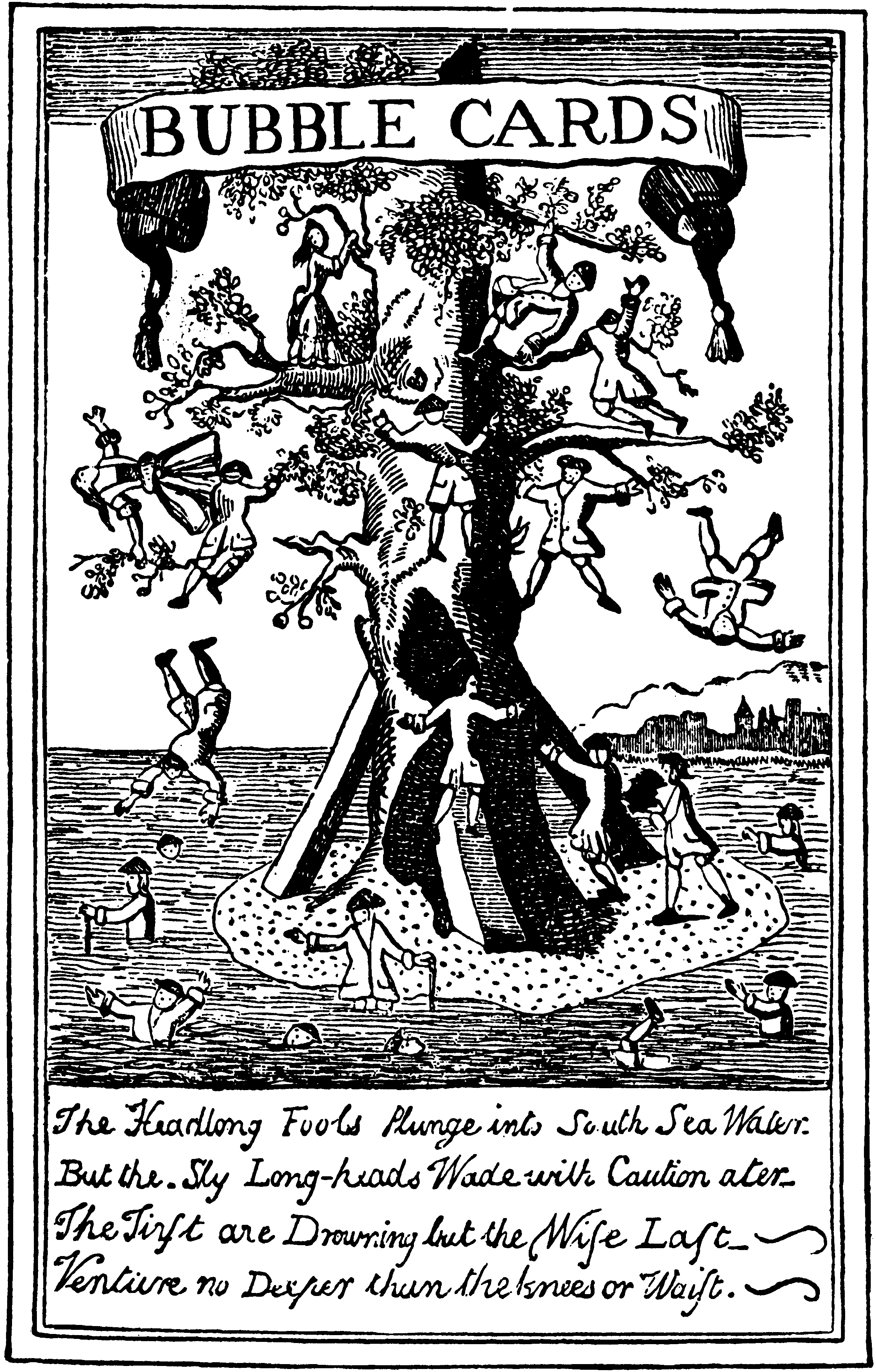
Tree caricature from Bubble Cards.

The price of the stock went up over the course of a year from about £100 to almost £1,000 per share. Its success caused a national frenzy—herd behaviour—as all types of people, from peasants to lords, developed a feverish interest in investing, in South Seas primarily but in stocks generally. One famous apocryphal story is of a company that went public in 1720 as "a company for carrying out an undertaking of great advantage, but nobody to know what it is".

The price finally reached £1,000 in early August 1720, and the level of selling was such that the price started to fall, dropping back to £100 per share before the year was out. This triggered bankruptcies amongst those who had bought on credit, and increased sales, including short selling (i.e., selling borrowed shares in the hope of buying them back at a profit if the price fell). In August 1720, the first of the instalment payments of the first and second money subscriptions on new issues of South Sea stock were due. Earlier in the year John Blunt had come up with an idea to prop up the share price, the company would lend people money to buy its shares. As a result, many shareholders could not pay for their shares except by selling them. A scramble for liquidity appeared internationally as "bubbles" were also ending in Amsterdam and Paris. The collapse coincided with the fall of the Mississippi Company of John Law in France and the price of South Sea shares began to decline.

=== Recriminations ===
By the end of September the stock had fallen to £150. Company failures now extended to banks and goldsmiths, as they could not collect loans made on the stock, and thousands of individuals were ruined, including many members of the upper class. With investors outraged, Parliament was recalled in December and an investigation began. Reporting in 1721, it revealed widespread fraud amongst the company directors and corruption in the Cabinet. Among those implicated were John Aislabie (the Chancellor of the Exchequer), James Craggs the Elder (the Postmaster General), James Craggs the Younger (the Southern Secretary), and even Lord Stanhope and Lord Sunderland (the heads of the Ministry). Craggs the Elder and Craggs the Younger died in disgrace; the remainder were impeached for their corruption. The Commons found Aislabie guilty of the "most notorious, dangerous and infamous corruption" and he was imprisoned. The corruption around the South Sea bubble was the impetus for the writing and publication of Cato's Letters which became an important work first for the Radical Whigs and then into the libertarian ideology of the American Revolution.

The new First Lord of the Treasury, Robert Walpole, restored public confidence in the financial system. Public opinion, as shaped by the many prominent men who lost money, demanded revenge. Walpole supervised the process, which removed all 33 of the company directors and stripped them of, on average, 82 per cent of their wealth. The money went to the victims and the stock of the South Sea Company was divided between the Bank of England and the East India Company. Walpole made sure that King George and his mistresses were protected, and by a margin of three votes he managed to save several key government officials from impeachment. In the process, Walpole won plaudits as the saviour of the financial system while establishing himself as the dominant figure in British politics; historians credit him for rescuing the Whig government and the Hanoverian dynasty from disgrace.

=== Quotations prompted by the collapse ===
Joseph Spence wrote that Lord Radnor reported to him "When Sir Isaac Newton was asked about the continuance of the rising of South Sea stock ... He answered 'that he could not calculate the madness of people'". He is also quoted, "I can calculate the movement of the stars, but not the madness of men". Newton owned nearly £22,000 in South Sea stock in 1722, and lost at least £10,000 (equivalent to £1.91 million in 2025).

== A trading company ==
The South Sea Company was created in 1711 to reduce the size of public debts, but was granted the commercial privilege of exclusive rights of trade to the Spanish Indies, based on the treaty of commerce signed by Britain and the Archduke Charles, candidate to the Spanish throne during the War of the Spanish Succession. After Philip V became the King of Spain, Britain obtained at the 1713 Treaty of Utrecht the rights to the slave trade to the Spanish Indies (or Asiento de Negros) for 30 years. Those rights were previously held by the Compagnie de Guinée et de l'Assiente du Royaume de la France.

The South Sea Company board opposed taking on the slave trade, which had shown little profitability when chartered companies had engaged in it. To increase the profitability, the Asiento contract included the right to send one yearly 500-ton ship to the fairs at Portobello and Veracruz loaded with duty-free merchandises, called the Navío de Permiso. The Crown of England and the King of Spain were each entitled to 25% of the profits, according to the terms of the contract, that was a copy of the French Asiento contract, but Queen Anne soon renounced her share. The King of Spain did not receive any payments due to him, and this was one of the sources of contention between the Spanish Crown and the South Sea Company.

As was the case for previous holders of the Asiento, the Portuguese and the French, the profit was not in the slave trade but in the illegal contraband goods smuggled in the slave ships and in the annual ship. Those goods were sold at the Spanish colonies at a handsome price, for they were in high demand; and constituted unfair competition with taxed goods, proving a large drain on the Spanish Crown's trade income. The relationship between the South Sea Company and the Government of Spain was always bad, and worsened with time. The company complained of searches and seizures of goods, lack of profitability, and confiscation of properties during the wars between Britain and Spain of 1718–1723 and 1727–1729, during which the operations of the company were suspended. The Government of Spain complained of the illegal trade, failure of the company to present its accounts as stipulated by the contract, and non-payment of the King's share of the profits. These claims were a major cause of deteriorating relations between the two countries in 1738; and although the Prime Minister Walpole opposed war, there was strong support for it from the King, the House of Commons, and a faction in his own Cabinet. Walpole was able to negotiate a treaty with the King of Spain at the Convention of Pardo in January 1739 that stipulated that Spain would pay British merchants £95,000 in compensation for captures and seized goods, while the South Sea Company would pay the Spanish Crown £68,000 in due proceeds from the Asiento. The South Sea Company refused to pay those proceeds and the King of Spain retained payment of the compensation until payment from the South Sea Company could be secured. The break-up of relations between the South Sea Company and the Spanish Government was a prelude to the Guerra del Asiento, as the first Royal Navy fleets departed in July 1739 for the Caribbean, prior to the declaration of war, which lasted from October 1739 until 1748. This war is known as the War of Jenkins' Ear.

=== Slave trade under the Asiento ===
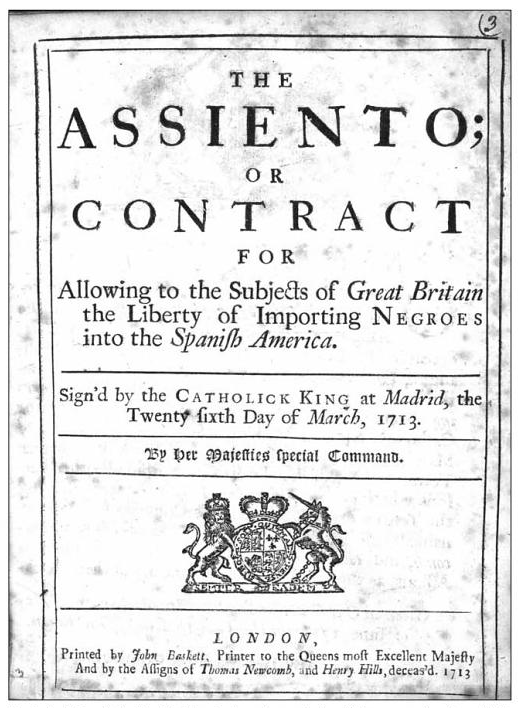
Cover of the English translation of the Asiento contract signed by Britain and Spain in 1713 as part of the Utrecht treaty that ended the War of Spanish Succession. The contract granted exclusive rights to Britain to sell slaves in the Spanish Indies.

During its time administering the Asiento de Negros, the company trafficked more than 34,000 people, with a total of about 4,000 people dying on the Middle Passage. The company, against the advice of its own surgeon, Dr Dover, stationed in Buenos Aires, branded the trafficked Africans with the letters "SCC" (South Sea Company) below the crown of Queen Anne. Trade was successful and continued to operate as a slave trafficking company through two wars between Britain and Spain and after the Bubble burst, a period during which it transported some of its largest number of enslaved people. It worked with the Royal African Company and was protected by the Royal Navy.

=== The annual ship ===
The slave Asiento contract of 1713 granted a permit to send one vessel of 500 tons per year, loaded with duty-free merchandise to be sold at the fairs of New Spain, Cartagena and Portobello. This was an unprecedented concession that broke two centuries of strict exclusion of foreign merchants from the Spanish Empire, although a quarter of the profit was to be paid to the Spanish Crown.

The first ship to head for the Americas, the Royal Prince, was scheduled for 1714 but was delayed until August 1716. In consideration of the three annual ships missed since the date of the Asiento, the permitted tonnage of the next ten ships was raised to 650. Only seven annual ships sailed during the Asiento, the last one being the Royal Caroline in 1732. The company's failure to produce accounts for all the annual ships but the first one, and lack of payment of the proceeds to the Spanish Crown from the profits for all the annual ships, resulted in no permits being granted after the Royal Caroline trip of 1732–1734.

In contrast to the "legitimate" trade in slaves, the regular trade of the annual ships generated healthy returns, in some case profits were over 100%. Accounts for the voyage of the Royal Prince were not presented until 1733, following continuous demands by Spanish officials. They reported profits of £43,607. Since the King of Spain was entitled to 25% of the profits, after deducting interest on a loan he claimed £8,678. The South Sea Company never paid the amount due for the first annual ship to the Spanish Crown, nor did it pay any amount for any of the other six trips.

=== Arctic whaling ===
The Greenland Company had been established by an act of Parliament, the Greenland Trade Act 1692 (4 Will. & Mar. c. 17) in 1693 with the object of catching whales in the Arctic. The products of their "whale-fishery" were to be free of customs and other duties. Partly due to maritime disruption caused by wars with France, the Greenland Company failed financially within a few years. In 1722 Henry Elking published a proposal, directed at the governors of the South Sea Company, that they should resume the "Greenland Trade" and send ships to catch whales in the Arctic. He made very detailed suggestions about how the ships should be crewed and equipped.

The British Parliament confirmed that a British Arctic "whale-fishery" would continue to benefit from freedom from customs duties, and in 1724 the South Sea Company decided to commence whaling. They had 12 whale-ships built on the River Thames and these went to the Greenland seas in 1725. Further ships were built in later years, but the venture was not successful. There were hardly any experienced whalemen remaining in Britain, and the company had to engage Dutch and Danish whalemen for the key posts aboard their ships: for instance all commanding officers and harpooners were hired from the North Frisian island of Föhr. Other costs were badly controlled and the catches remained disappointingly few, even though the company was sending up to 25 ships to Davis Strait and the Greenland seas in some years. By 1732 the company had accumulated a net loss of £177,782 from their eight years of Arctic whaling.

The South Sea Company directors appealed to the British government for further support. Parliament had passed the Greenland Fishery Act 1731 (5 Geo. 2. c. 28) in 1732 that extended the duty-free concessions for a further nine years. In 1733 the Whale Fishery Act 1732 (6 Geo. 2. c. 33) was passed that also granted a government subsidy to British Arctic whalers, the first in a long series of such acts of Parliament that continued and modified the whaling subsidies throughout the 18th century. This, and the subsequent acts, required the whalers to meet conditions regarding the crewing and equipping of the whale-ships that closely resembled the conditions suggested by Elking in 1722. In spite of the extended duty-free concessions, and the prospect of real subsidies as well, the court and directors of the South Sea Company decided that they could not expect to make profits from Arctic whaling. They sent out no more whale-ships after the loss-making 1732 season.

== Government debt after the Seven Years' War ==
South Sea Company's Arrangement Act 1853
- Act of Parliament
- Parliament of the United Kingdom
- Long title: An Act to enable the South Sea Company to enter into Arrangements with certain Proprietors of the Company.
- Citation: 16 & 17 Vict. c. ccxix

Dates
- Royal assent: 20 August 1853

Text of statute as originally enacted

South Sea Company's Winding Up Act 1854
- Act of Parliament
- Parliament of the United Kingdom
- Long title: An Act to enable the South Sea Company to realize and divide their Capital Stock and Assets.
- Citation: 17 & 18 Vict. c. cxxi

Dates
- Royal assent: 3 July 1854

The company continued its trade (when not interrupted by war) until the end of the Seven Years' War (1756–1763). However, its main function was always managing government debt, rather than trading with the Spanish colonies. The South Sea Company continued its management of part of the national debt until it was disestablished in 1853, at which point the debt was reconsolidated. The debt was not paid off by the time of the First World War, at which point it was consolidated again, under terms that allowed the government to avoid repaying the principal.

== Armorials ==
The armorials of the South Sea Company, according to a grant of arms dated 31 October 1711, were: Azure, a globe whereon are represented the Straits of Magellan and Cape Horn all proper and in sinister chief point two herrings haurient in saltire argent crowned or, in a canton the united arms of Great Britain. Crest: A ship of three masts in full sail. Supporters, dexter: The emblematic figure of Britannia, with the shield, lance etc all proper; sinister: A fisherman completely clothed, with cap boots fishing net etc and in his hand a string of fish, all proper.

== Officers of the South Sea Company ==
South Sea Company Act 1753
- Act of Parliament
- Parliament of Great Britain
- Long title: An Act for reducing the Number of Directors of the Corporation of the Governor and Company of Merchants of Great Britain trading to The South-Seas and other Parts of America; and for encouraging the Fishery; and for regulating the Election of the Governors and Directors of the said Company.
- Citation: 26 Geo. 2. c. 16
- Territorial extent: Great Britain

Dates
- Royal assent: 15 May 1753
- Commencement: 11 January 1753 (Note: Start of session.)
- Repealed: 15 July 1867
Other legislation
Repealed by	Statute Law Revision Act 1867

Status: Repealed

Text of statute as originally enacted

The South Sea Company had a governor (generally an honorary position), a subgovernor, a deputy governor and 30 directors – reduced by the South Sea Company Act 1753 (26 Geo. 2. c. 16) to 21 directors.

Year	Governor	Subgovernor	Deputy governor
July 1711	Robert Harley, 1st Earl of Oxford	Sir James Bateman	Samuel Ongley
August 1712	Robert Harley, 1st Earl of Oxford	Sir James Bateman	Sir Ambrose Crowley
October 1713	Robert Harley, 1st Earl of Oxford	Sir James Bateman	Samuel Shepheard
February 1715	George, Prince of Wales	Sir James Bateman	Samuel Shepheard
February 1718	King George I	Sir James Bateman	Samuel Shepheard
November 1718	King George I	John Fellows	Samuel Shepheard
February 1719	King George I	John Fellows	Charles Joye
February 1721	King George I	Sir John Eyles, Bt	John Rudge
July 1727	King George II	Sir John Eyles, Bt	John Rudge
February 1730	King George II	Sir John Eyles, Bt	John Hanbury
February 1733	King George II	Sir Richard Hopkins	John Bristow
February 1735	King George II	Peter Burrell	John Bristow
March 1756	King George II	John Bristow	John Philipson
February 1756	King George II	John Bristow	Lewis Way
January 1760	King George III	John Bristow	Lewis Way
February 1763	King George III	Lewis Way	Richard Jackson
March 1768	King George III	Lewis Way	Thomas Coventry
January 1771	King George III	Thomas Coventry	vacant (?)
January 1772	King George III	Thomas Coventry	John Warde
March 1775	King George III	Thomas Coventry	Samuel Salt
January 1793	King George III	Benjamin Way	Robert Dorrell
February 1802	King George III	Benjamin Way	Peter Pierson
February 1808	King George III	Charles Bosanquet	Benjamin Harrison
1820	King George IV	Charles Bosanquet	Benjamin Harrison
January 1826	King George IV	Charles Bosanquet	Sir Robert Baker
1830	King William IV	Charles Bosanquet	Sir Robert Baker
July 1837	Queen Victoria	Charles Bosanquet	Sir Robert Baker
January 1838	Queen Victoria	Charles Franks	Thomas Vigne

== In fiction ==
- David Liss' historical-mystery novel A Conspiracy of Paper, set in 1720 London, is focused on the South Sea Company at the top of its power, its fierce rivalry with the Bank of England and the events leading up to the collapse of the "bubble".
- Charles Lamb's essay The South-Sea House (1820) in Essays of Elia – Lamb once worked in the South Sea House, and adopted his pseudonym (Elia) from a coworker there.
- Charles Dickens novels are littered with stock-market speculations, villains, swindlers and fictional speculators:
  - Nicholas Nickleby (1839) – Ralph Nickleby's great Joint Stock Company, United Metropolitan Improved Hot Muffin and Crumpet Baking and Punctual Delivery Company.
  - Martin Chuzzlewit (1844) – Anglo-Bengalee Disinterested Loan and Life Company, modelled loosely on the South Sea Bubble, is in essence a classic Ponzi scheme.
  - David Copperfield (1850) – The false accounting by the sycophant Uriah Heep, clerk to lawyer Mr Wickfield.
  - Little Dorrit (1857) – The financial house of Mr Merdle.
- Robert Goddard's novel Sea Change (2000) covers the aftermath of the "bubble" and the attempts by politicians to evade responsibility and prevent a Jacobite restoration.

== See also ==
- List of stock market crashes and bear markets
- South Sea Company coinage
- Atlantic slave trade
- Edward Colston
- Tulip mania
- History of company law in the United Kingdom
- Whaling in the United Kingdom
- Mississippi Bubble
- Buttonwood Agreement USA 1792
- Bern banking crisis of 1720

== Bibliography ==
Historical

- Balen, Malcolm (2002). A Very English Deceit: The Secret History of the South Sea Bubble and the First Great Financial Scandal (London: Fourth Estate) ISBN 978-1-841-15552-4
- Brown, V.L. (1926), "The South Sea Company and Contraband Trade", The American Historical Review, 31 (4): 662–678, doi:10.2307/1840061, JSTOR 1840061
- Carlos, Ann M. and Neal, Larry. (2006) "The Micro-Foundations of the Early London Capital Market: Bank of England shareholders during and after the South Sea Bubble, 1720–25", Economic History Review 59 (2006), pp. 498–538. online
- Carswell, John (1960), The South Sea Bubble, London: Cresset Press
- Cowles, Virginia (1960), The Great Swindle: The Story of the South Sea Bubble, New York: Harper
- Dale, Richard S.; et al. (2005), "Financial markets can go mad: evidence of irrational behaviour during the South Sea Bubble", Economic History Review, 58 (2): 233–271, doi:10.1111/j.1468-0289.2005.00304.x, S2CID 154836178
- Dale, Richard (2004). The First Crash: Lessons from the South Sea Bubble (Princeton University Press)
- Freeman, Mark, Robin Pearson, and James Taylor. (2013) "Law, politics and the governance of English and Scottish joint-stock companies, 1600–1850", Business History 55#4 (2013): 636–652. online
- Harris, Ron (1994). "The Bubble Act: Its Passage and its Effects on Business Organization", The Journal of Economic History, 54 (3), 610–627
- Hildner, E.G. Jr. (1938), "The Role of the South Sea Company in the Diplomacy leading to the War of Jenkins' Ear, 1729–1739", The Hispanic American Historical Review, 18 (3): 322–341, doi:10.2307/2507151, JSTOR 2507151
- Hoppit, Julian. (2002) "The Myths of the South Sea Bubble", Transactions of the Royal Historical Society, (2002) 12#1 pp. 141–165 in JSTOR
- Kleer, Richard A. (2015) "Riding a wave: the Company's role in the South Sea Bubble", The Economic History Review 68.1 (2015): 264–285. online
- Löwe, Kathleen (2021) Die Südseeblase in der englischen Kunst des 18. und 19. Jahrhunderts. Bilder einer Finanzkrise, Berlin: Reimer.
- McLachlan, J.O. (1940), Trade and Peace With Old Spain, 1667–1750, Cambridge: Cambridge University Press
- McColloch, William E. (2013) "A shackled revolution? The Bubble Act and financial regulation in eighteenth-century England", Review of Keynesian Economics 1.3 (2013): 300–313. online
- Mackay, C. Extraordinary Popular Delusions and the Madness of Crowds (1841)
- Marshall, Dorothy. (1962) Eighteenth Century England Longman. pp. 121–130.
- Michie, R.C. (2001), "From Market to Exchange, 1693–1801", The London Stock Exchange, Oxford: Oxford University Press, ISBN 978-0-19-924255-9
- Nelson, G.H. (1945), "Contraband Trade Under the Asiento", The American Historical Review, 51 (1): 55–67, doi:10.2307/1843076, JSTOR 1843076
- Paul, Helen Julia (2010) The South Sea Bubble: an economic history of its origins and consequences, Routledge Explorations in Economic History online short summary
- Paul, Helen. (2013) The South Sea Bubble: An Economic History of its Origins and Consequences Routledge, 176 pp.
- Paul, Helen, The "South Sea Bubble", 1720, EGO – European History Online, Mainz: Institute of European History, 2015, retrieved: 17 March 2021 (pdf).
- Plumb, J. H. (1956) Sir Robert Walpole, vol. 1, The Making of a Statesman. ch 8
- Shea, Gary S. (2007), "Understanding financial derivatives during the South Sea Bubble: The case of the South Sea subscription shares" (PDF), Oxford Economic Papers, 59 (Supplement 1): i73–i104, doi:10.1093/oep/gpm031
- Temin, Peter; Voth, Hans-Joachim (2004), "Riding the South Sea Bubble", American Economic Review, 94 (5): 1654–1668, doi:10.1257/0002828043052268, hdl:10230/508
- Stratmann, Silke (2000) Myths of Speculation: The South Sea Bubble and 18th-century English Literature. Munich: Fink
- Walker, G.J. (1979), Política Española y Comercio Colonial 1700–1789, Barcelona: Editorial Ariel

Fiction

- Goddard, Robert (2000), Sea Change, London: Bantam Press, p. 416, ISBN 978-0-593-04667-8. Novel set against the background of the South Sea bubble.
- Liss, David (2000), A Conspiracy of Paper, New York: Random House, ISBN 978-0-375-50292-7. Novel set in the South Sea Company bubble.
