= Samuel Tufnell =

British lawyer and Whig politician

Samuel Tufnell (15 September 1682 – 1758), of Langleys, Essex, was a British lawyer and Whig politician who sat in the House of Commons between 1715 and 1747.

== Early life ==
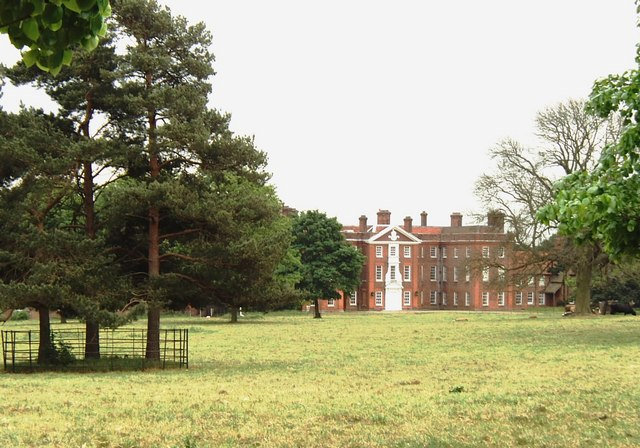
Langleys, Great Waltham

Tufnell was the son of John Tufnell, brewer, of St Mary's Undershaft, London, and Monken Hadley, Middlesex, and his wife Elizabeth Jolliffe, daughter of John Jolliffe, MP, merchant and alderman of London. He matriculated at Merton College, Oxford in 1698. On the death of his father in 1699, he succeeded to the family estate, under the trusteeship of his uncles, Sir William Jolliffe and Sir Edward Northey. He was admitted to Middle Temple in 1699 and called to the bar in 1703. He undertook a Grand Tour through the Netherlands, Germany, Italy and Switzerland from 1703 to 1705. He became a Fellow of the Royal Society in 1709 In 1710 he purchased the manor of Langleys, at Great Waltham, not far from Maldon and in 1719, built a fine red brick house on an H-shaped plan which incorporated the north wing of an earlier house from about 1620. He was captain of a troop of Essex militia in 1715. He married (with £10,000) Elizabeth Cressener, daughter of George Cressener of Earl's Colne, Essex on 19 December 1717.

== Career ==
Tufnell stood with Sir William Jolliffe as a Whig candidate for Maldon at the 1715 British general election, and was returned as Member of Parliament on petition on 20 May 1715. He spoke in support of the septennial bill in 1716.

In June 1717, he exchanged words with Walpole after Walpole insinuated that his support for the impeachment of Lord Oxford, was in deference to Walpole's power rather than his person. When there was a split in the Whig party he was given a temporary place as commissioner of the equivalent on 24 July 1717 which lapsed on 18 April 1719, after which he spoke against the Peerage Bill. After the collapse of the South Sea bubble in 1720 he supported Walpole's efforts to limit the actions against its authors.

The secret committee of the Commons on the South Sea affair presented a report containing the names of a number of Members who had allowed themselves to be put down by the Company for stock without paying for it, on the understanding that if the South Sea bill went through and the stock consequently rose, they would be entitled to receive the difference. Tufnell's name was on the list as being allotted £5,000 worth. The matter was not pursued by the Commons and he professed he was able to clear himself after ‘a scandalous list that was handed about giving him as one of the member who received South Sea stock for giving their votes for the South Sea bill’. He did not stand at the 1722 British general election.

After spending time out of Parliament, Tufnell successfully contested Colchester at the 1727 British general election as a Walpole Whig. He voted for the excise bill and against the repeal of the Septennial Act. In June 1732 he was appointed a commissioner for settling commerce at Antwerp, dealing with the commissioners of the Emperor and the States General on commercial and other matters arising out of the treaty of Vienna.

He did not stand at the 1734 British general election and after the negotiations opened at Antwerp in 1737, he remained there and made occasional visits to England. The negotiations ended inconclusively on the outbreak of the War of Austrian succession. Although there is no evidence that he practised at the law, he became a bencher of his Inn in 1740.

Tufnell was returned on Walpole's nomination as MP for Great Marlow in 1741, and continued voting regularly with the Government. He retired at the 1747 British general election.

== Later life and legacy ==
Tufnell succeeded his uncle, Sir William Jolliffe, to Pleshey, Essex in 1750. He died on 28 December 1758 and was buried at Pleshey. He left three sons and two daughters.

- John Joliffe MP married Anna daughter of William Meeke of Beverley
- George MP married Elizabeth Foster
- William died 1729 unmarried
- Elizabeth died 1794 unmarried
- Maria Anna died 1790 unmarried

Parliament of Great Britain
Preceded by John Comyns; Thomas Bramston	Member of Parliament for Maldon; 1715–1722; With: Thomas Bramston	Succeeded by Sir John Comyns; Thomas Bramston
Preceded by Sir Thomas Webster; Matthew Martin	Member of Parliament for Colchester; 1727–1734; With: Stamp Brooksbank	Succeeded by Isaac Lemyng Rebow; Matthew Martin
Preceded by Edmund Waller; Sir Thomas Hoby	Member of Parliament for Great Marlow; 1741–1747; With: Sir Thomas Hoby; William Ockenden 1744	Succeeded by Merrick Burrell; William Ockenden
