= Edward Cary (MP for Colchester) =

MP for Colchester

Member of Parliament for Colchester
- In office 1690–1692 Serving with Samuel Reynolds
- Preceded by: Samuel Reynolds and Sir Isaac Rebow
- Succeeded by: Samuel Reynolds and Sir Isaac Rebow

Personal details
- Born: bap. 25 April 1656
- Died: 9 August 1692
- Party: Tory
- Spouse: Anne Cary (nee Lucas)
- Children: 2, including Lucius
- Parents: Patrick Cary (father); Susan Cary (nee Uvedale) (mother)
- Education: Christ Church, Oxford

Edward Cary (bap. 25 April 1656 – 9 August 1692) was MP for Colchester from 1690 until August 1692.

Cary was born the second son of Patrick Cary and Susan Cary (nee Uvedale). His father was a poet and the youngest son of Henry Cary, 1st Viscount Falkland.

He married his cousin Anne, the daughter of Charles, 2nd Baron Lucas and had one son, Lucius Cary, 6th Viscount Falkland and one daughter.
