= Isaac Lemyng Rebow =

MP for Colchester

Member of Parliament for Colchester
- In office 1734–1735 Serving with Matthew Martin
- Preceded by: Stamp Brooksbank; Samuel Tufnell
- Succeeded by: Jacob Houblon

Personal details
- Born: circa. 1705
- Died: 3 March 1735
- Party: Whig
- Spouse: Mary Rebow (née Martin)
- Children: 1
- Parents: Lemyng Rebow (father); Abigail Rebow (nee Chamberlain) (mother)
- Relatives: Sir Isaac Rebow (grandfather)
- Education: Fulham School; Trinity College, Cambridge

Isaac Lemyng Rebow (c. 1705 – 3 March 1735) was MP for Colchester from 1734 till his death on 3 March 1735. He succeeded his grandfather, Sir Isaac Rebow who was also an MP for Colchester.

== Biography ==
Rebow was born around 1705, the second son of Lemyng Rebow and Abigail Rebow (née Chamberlain). He was educated at Fulham School and Trinity College, Cambridge. In 1729, he married Mary Martin and they had one son, Isaac Martin Rebow, born on 28 November 1731.
