= Isaac Rebow =

English clothier, merchant and politician

Sir Isaac Rebow
- Born: Colchester, Essex, England
- Baptized: 15 July 1655
- Died: 19 September 1726 (aged 71)
- Resting place: St Mary-at-the-Walls, Colchester
- Occupations: Clothier and merchant
- Political party: Whig
- Spouse: Mary Lemyng (m. 1674; died 1681) Mary Macro (m. 1685; died 1692) Elizabeth Honeywood (née Wiseman) (m. 1694)
- Parents: John Rebow (father); Sarah Rebow (née Tayspill) (mother)

Member of Parliament for Colchester
- In office 1689–1690 Serving with Samuel Reynolds
- Preceded by: Sir Walter Clarges and Nathaniel Lawrence
- Succeeded by: Samuel Reynolds and Edward Cary
- In office 1692–1714 Serving with Samuel Reynolds (1692-1694), Sir Thomas Cooke (1694-1695), Sir John Morden (1695-1698), Sir Thomas Cooke (1698-1705), Edward Bullock (1705), Sir Thomas Webster (1705-1711), William Gore (1711-1713) and Sir Thomas Webster (1713-1714)
- Preceded by: Samuel Reynolds and Edward Cary
- Succeeded by: Sir Thomas Webster and Nicholas Corsellis
- In office 1715–1722 Serving with Richard Du Cane
- Preceded by: Sir Thomas Webster and Nicholas Corsellis
- Succeeded by: Sir Thomas Webster and Matthew Martin

Vice-Admiral of Essex
- In office 1692–1702
- Preceded by: Edward Cary
- Succeeded by: Sir Charles Barrington

High Steward of Colchester
- In office 1703–1726
- Preceded by: Aubrey de Vere, 20th Earl of Oxford
- Succeeded by: Matthew Martin

Sir Isaac Rebow (1655 – 1726) was a clothier and merchant who served as Member of Parliament for Colchester in the late seventeenth and early eighteenth centuries.

== Early life ==
Rebow was baptised in the Dutch Church in Colchester on 15 July 1655. His parents came from two prominent Colchester families with Flemish origins. His father was the clothier and merchant John Rebow, while his mother, Sarah, was the daughter of the wealthy Colchester bay-maker and merchant Francis Tayspill. John Rebow received a grant of arms in April 1685 and died in April 1699.

== Career ==
=== Business ===
Rebow had a wide range of business interests, which he appears to have conducted on a non-partisan basis despite his Whig political interests. He invested £3000 in the South Sea Company (enough to qualify him as a director), had a large shareholding in the East India Company, and exported over 10,000 pieces of silver to India between 1697 and 1700. In 1696 he was a commissioner taking subscriptions for Nicholas Barbon's National Land Bank and in 1720 he became a director of the newly established Royal Exchange Assurance. He also owned a ship trading with Portugal.

Rebow's will listed lands in Essex, Kent, Suffolk and Middlesex among his assets, as well as the manor of Gasper, then in Somerset. In 1705 he bought Colchester Castle from his indebted steward, the ironmonger John Wheeley (sometimes spelt Wheely). He inherited a partial interest in the reversionary lease of two lighthouses in Harwich through his first wife, whose mother was the heir to Sir William Batten, and in 1707 was granted a patent allowing him to charge all ships passing them.

=== Politics ===
Following the Glorious Revolution of 1689, the Whigs gained control of political power in Colchester, with Rebow the dominant figure in the party locally. According to the historian Andrew Phillips, "As a political 'boss' [Rebow] was ruthless in his pursuit of electoral victory". In the 1690s a practice emerged in Colchester of selling free burgess status to political supporters to secure election victories, with Rebow being one of those accused of doing so. This led to costly disputes that damaged the borough's finances, leading to many of its assets being mortgaged and, after Rebow's death, to the loss of its charter in 1742. Against this background, Rebow held, at one time or another, all of Colchester's most significant political roles. He was MP for Colchester in most of the parliaments between 1689 and 1722, being consistently recorded as a Whig, and also served at different times as the borough's mayor, recorder and high steward.

Rebow was elected as MP for the first time in 1689, serving in the Convention Parliament which offered the throne to William III and Mary II. He lost his seat in the following year's election, despite petitioning twice that he had won the most votes. Three polls had been taken, with Rebow topping all of them but with different totals. He refused to attend a scrutiny called by the mayor John Potter, some of his votes were discounted, and his majority was overturned.

While he was out of Parliament, Rebow was appointed to the Commission of the Peace in 1690, examining "dangerous persons" who had tried to leave the country, and as Vice-Admiral of Essex in August 1692, being paid £150 a year until 1697 to impress 300 men and gathering information about goods being smuggled from Holland in 1696.

He was re-elected to the House of Commons in a November 1692 by-election and secured a new charter for Colchester in August 1693. This reinstated the town's charter of 1663, replacing those of 1684 and 1688 which had reduced the number of assistants, common councillors and aldermen, excluded the free burgesses from elections, required officers to be Church of England communicants, and empowered the king and Privy Council to remove officers at will. In 1694 he became a freeman of Colchester.

He probably topped the poll at the 1695 election and his election was not disputed, despite an unsuccessful attempt to challenge the election of his fellow Whig Sir John Morden by the defeated MP Sir Thomas Cooke, against whose voters Rebow's steward John Wheeley gave evidence. Rebow subscribed to the Association in February 1696, acknowledging William III as king. Following a dispute over the nominations to be mayor of Colchester in June 1696, Rebow petitioned the Privy Council and, although his petition was unsuccessful, his ally John Seabrooke was elected as mayor. His steward, John Wheeley, was arrested for debt in October 1696 (a breach of parliamentary privilege) but was discharged by the House of Commons. Rebow himself was put into the care of the serjeant-at-arms in January 1697, having been absent from Westminster without permission, and in August of that year, the Government used his influence to quarter two companies of troops in Colchester.

In 1698, Rebow presented two bills related to Colchester to Parliament. The first, introduced in January, was to make navigable the River Colne between Colchester and Wivenhoe and the second, introduced in March, was to build hospitals and workhouses in the borough. Both gained Royal Assent in May. He was drawn into the controversy over the East India Company later that year owing to his financial expertise.

This period saw the start of the decline in Colchester's cloth trade, in which Rebow was involved and upon which the town was economically dependent. Spain, along with Portugal and both countries' American colonies, had consumed a high percentage of the cloth Colchester produced, but exports fell due to increased French influence in Spain and then the War of the Spanish Succession. This formed the backdrop to the July 1698 election and the January and November 1701 elections, all of which were uncontested, with Rebow and Sir Thomas Cooke as the only candidates, perhaps as a show of unity as the town's economy struggled. Petitions about the suffering of the poor of Colchester and the state of the town's trade were presented to Parliament in 1698, 1700, 1701 and 1702.

While Rebow celebrated the coronation of Queen Anne by providing the people of Colchester with Canary wine, under the new Tory-inclined monarch he lost his vice-admiralty in June 1702 and his control of Colchester's politics started to weaken. He was elected again at the August 1702 election, but the poll was declared void after John Wheeley, still his steward, admitted using "corrupt practices". Despite this, Rebow was successful when a new election was held in December.

In 1703, the post of High Steward of Colchester became vacant following the death of Aubrey de Vere, 20th Earl of Oxford. Rebow's successful candidacy for the role was backed by the mayor (Ralph Creffeild) and recorder of Colchester and various Dissenters, but opposed by a group of burgesses led by John Potter, who as mayor had failed to name Rebow on the 1690 return of MPs and had opposed him at the 1702 election. Colchester's other MP, the Tory Sir Thomas Cooke, nominated the Queen's husband, Prince George of Denmark, perhaps because Rebow had encouraged burgesses to petition against his election the year before. One account suggests that the Prince was successfully nominated despite the recorder telling the free burgesses that he would not accept the post, but Creffeild ran away with the borough mace to avoid having to declare the result. Cooke waited on the Prince two days later, receiving confirmation that he would accept the post. Rebow claimed that Cooke hadn't attended the prince and he would persuade Creffeild to call a new election as "the prince is but a subject and so am I". A new poll was held, with 146 supporters for Rebow. Despite 172 protestations against the poll, Creffeild declared Rebow elected. John Comyns, the MP for nearby Maldon, successfully petitioned for a court order enrolling the Prince as High Steward, but the mayor refused to follow this as Rebow claimed to have been legally elected.

Rebow continued to serve as MP, successfully contesting the 1705 election in which Cooke was replaced by the Whig Edward Bullock following the creation of 200 free burgesses by his opponents. A by-election in December 1705, caused by the death of Bullock, saw over 100 more free burgesses created in places such as alehouses and taverns by the new mayor, Rebow's supporter John Raynham. Most of these voted for the new Whig MP, Sir Thomas Webster, who was elected despite an attempt by Sir Thomas Cooke to win his seat back and two petitions to Parliament about the result. In 1707, Rebow's son-in-law Joseph Thurston became the borough recorder, and Rebow became one of the first trustees of the endowment of Colchester's grammar school, following the resolution of a dispute over the use to which income from it was being put by the municipality.

In the 1708 election Rebow and Webster were elected without opposition. He started to attend meetings of the borough's common council in the autumn 1709, partly because of an economic crisis (he warned the Government that "the poor threaten to rise" owing to the price of wheat, rye and bread) but also possibly because he was aware that he was likely to face a political challenge. Rebow topped the poll at the 1710 election but although Webster was initially elected as the other MP, the third candidate William Gore successfully petitioned to replace Webster over the illegitimate creation of free burgesses.

In 1711 the dispute over the creation of free burgesses came to a pause, when it was agreed that all previous admissions would be allowed but mayors would now need the permission of the common hall, but other political disputes continued, for example over the choice of mayor in 1713. Ahead of that year's election, two orders were passed allowing the Whigs to disfranchise the Tory prosecutors in the mayoral dispute and to establish a committee that was able to create more free burgesses. Rebow and Webster were re-elected, but the defeated Tories William Gore and Nicholas Corsellis petitioned Parliament and in May 1714 the Commons voted that Rebow and Webster had not been elected. Later that year, he was rushed through the offices of councillor and assistant to become a Colchester alderman over just two or three days. Webster had also become an alderman, and this secured their control over the borough. In July 1714, a new Commission for the Peace for Suffolk was set out by Henry St John, 1st Viscount Bolingbroke from which Rebow was excluded, as part of a purge of Whigs.

After a short absence from Parliament, Rebow was elected for a final time in 1715. Later that year, the weavers of Colchester asked Parliament for help in a dispute between them and the town's clothiers, caused by several restrictions introduced as a result of the downturn in the cloth trade. Rebow was appointed to a Commons Committee on the issue, which concluded that "the poor weavers had been most previously oppressed" and annulled a 1707 law that had restricted the right to make bays. Rebow served additionally as Mayor of Colchester in 1716–17. He stood unsuccessfully at the 1722 election and his petition about the result was not heard, despite being renewed twice. His final post was as the borough's recorder in 1723.

== Personal life and family ==
=== Family ===
Rebow was married three times. Firstly, in 1674, to Mary (d.1681), daughter of James and Mary Lemyng of Colchester (Mary Lemyng was daughter and co-heir of Sir William Batten). After her death, in 1685 he married another Mary (d.1692), daughter of Thomas and Mary Macro of Bury St Edmunds. After she died, in 1694 Rebow married Elizabeth (1664-1722), daughter of Sir William Wiseman, 1st Baronet of Rivenhall and his wife Elizabeth, and the widow of John Lamotte Honywood of Markshall.

Accounts of Rebow's family do not agree on its size. The most recent of the three volumes of The History of Parliament covering Rebow's career suggests that he had one son and one daughter by his first marriage and one son and three daughters by his second, but the older volumes give lower totals. Other research has suggested that he had nine or ten children in total from his first two marriages, most of whom died while young. Rebow was predeceased by his son Lemyng Rebow (1676-1717) and his wife Abigail (d.1722), the daughter of Charles Chamberlain, an alderman of the City of London. Lemyng and Abigail left two sons:

- Charles Chamberlain Rebow (1702-1753), who married Mary Nevill, sister of William Nevill, 16th Baron Bergavenny.
- Isaac Lemyng Rebow MP (1705-1735), who married Mary Martin, daughter of Captain Matthew Martin MP.

Two of Rebow's daughters are known to have married:

- Mary (d. 1736) married Joseph Thurston (d.1714) of Colchester and Little Wenham Hall, a barrister; their children included the poet Joseph Thurston.
- Susan (1687-1769), married Sir Edmund Bacon, 5th Baronet of Gillingham, Norfolk.

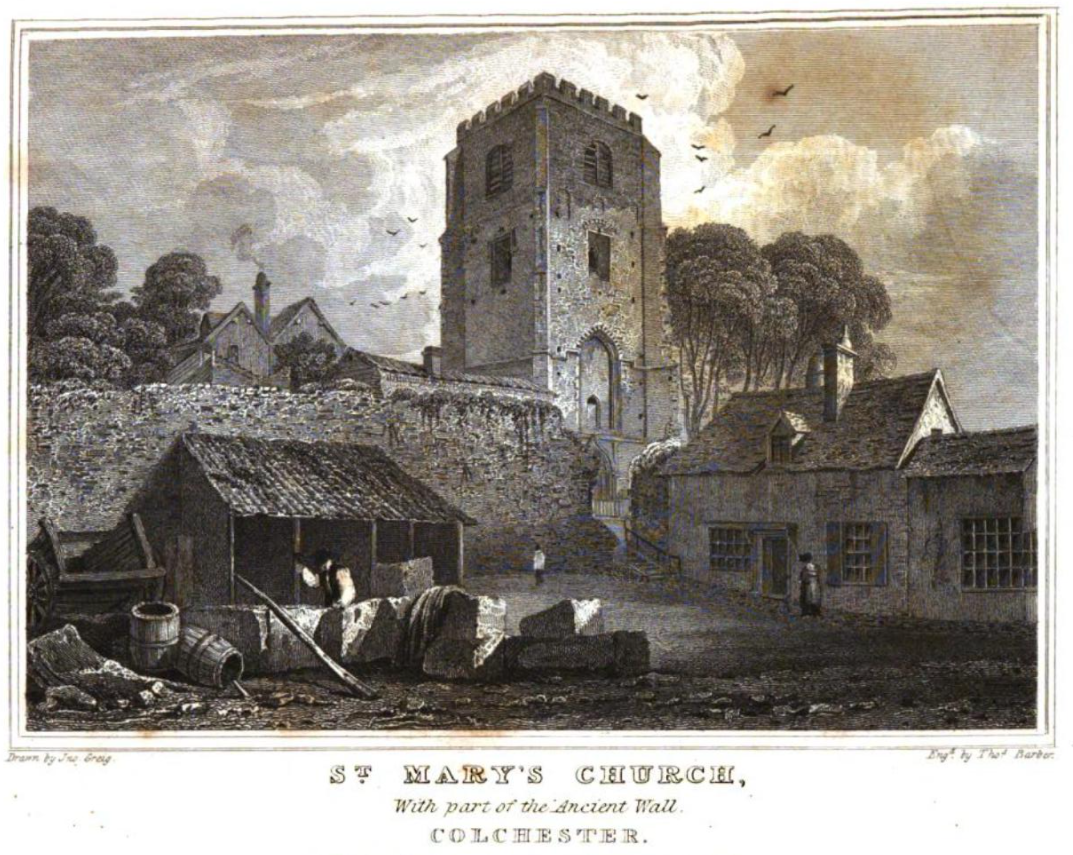
St Mary-at-the-Walls as it looked after the rebuilding Rebow helped to fund. It was subsequently rebuilt again in 1872.

Rebow was responsible for erecting a monument to his father, John Rebow (d.1699) at the church of St Mary-at-the-Walls in Colchester, which was subsequently also used to commemorate his own death and those of his descendants. The church itself had been damaged during the Siege of Colchester and Rebow, together with his son Lemyng Rebow and son-in-law Joseph Thurston, contributed funds towards its rebuilding in 1713–14.

=== Other relationships ===
Rebow is said to have been a personal friend of William III, who shared his Dutch origins, visiting him in Colchester at least three times between 1693 and 1700 and knighting him when he dined there in March 1693.

His contemporary and fellow Whig Daniel Defoe described him as "a gentleman of a good family and known character" in his 1724 book A Tour thro' the Whole Island of Great Britain. Defoe was familiar with Colchester, having secured the lease of the Severalls Estate north of the town from the indebted borough in 1722, and, according to Professor Pat Rogers, Defoe may have been "personally familiar" with Rebow, given his "extensive contacts" in the town. Links between the two men included Rebow's steward John Wheeley, who acted as a distribution agent for a pamphlet Defoe wrote for Robert Harley, and possibly also their similar business interests which included cloth and trade with Portugal. Rogers also claims that Defoe "probably drummed up support" in Rebow's election campaigns.

=== Homes ===
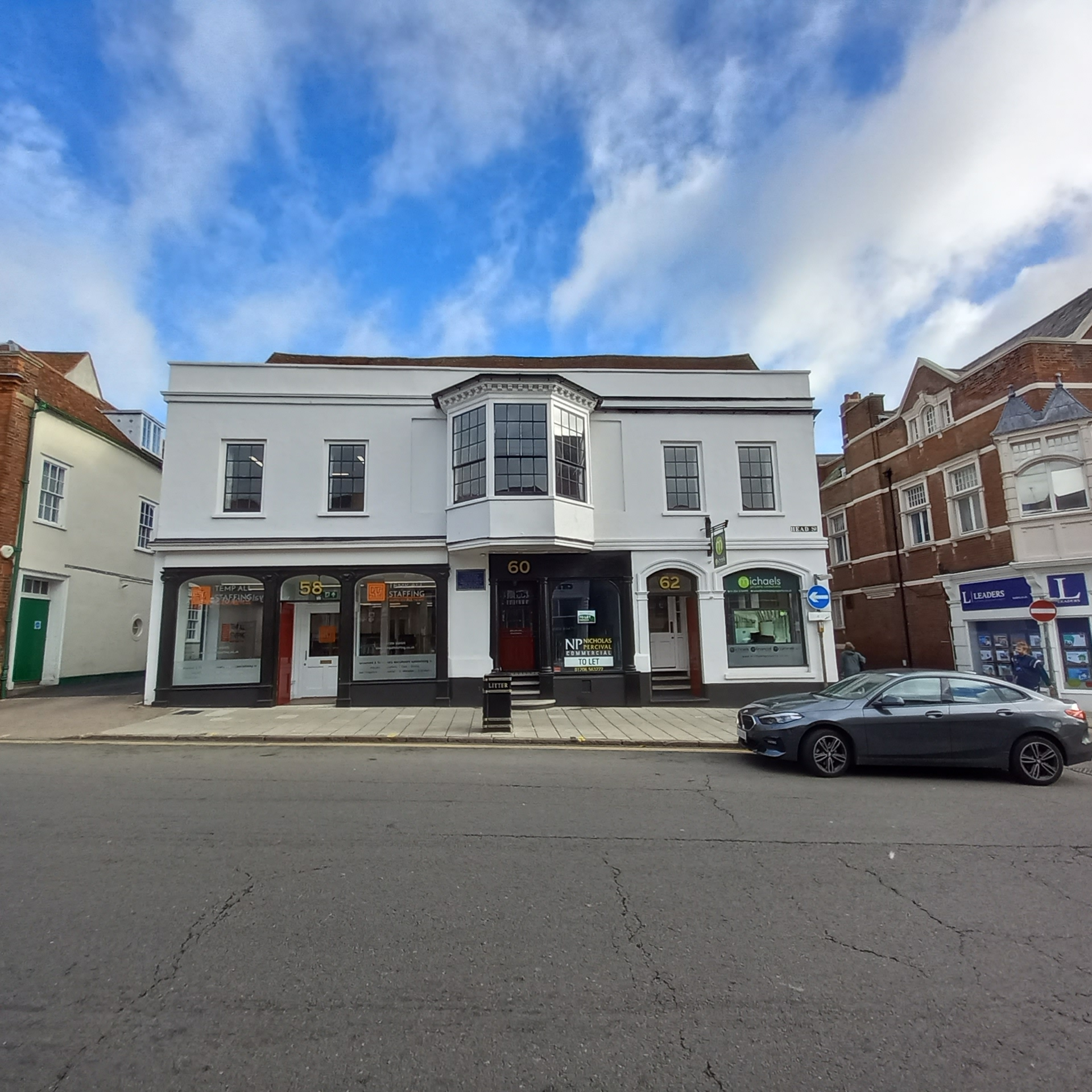
Rebow House, Head Street, Colchester

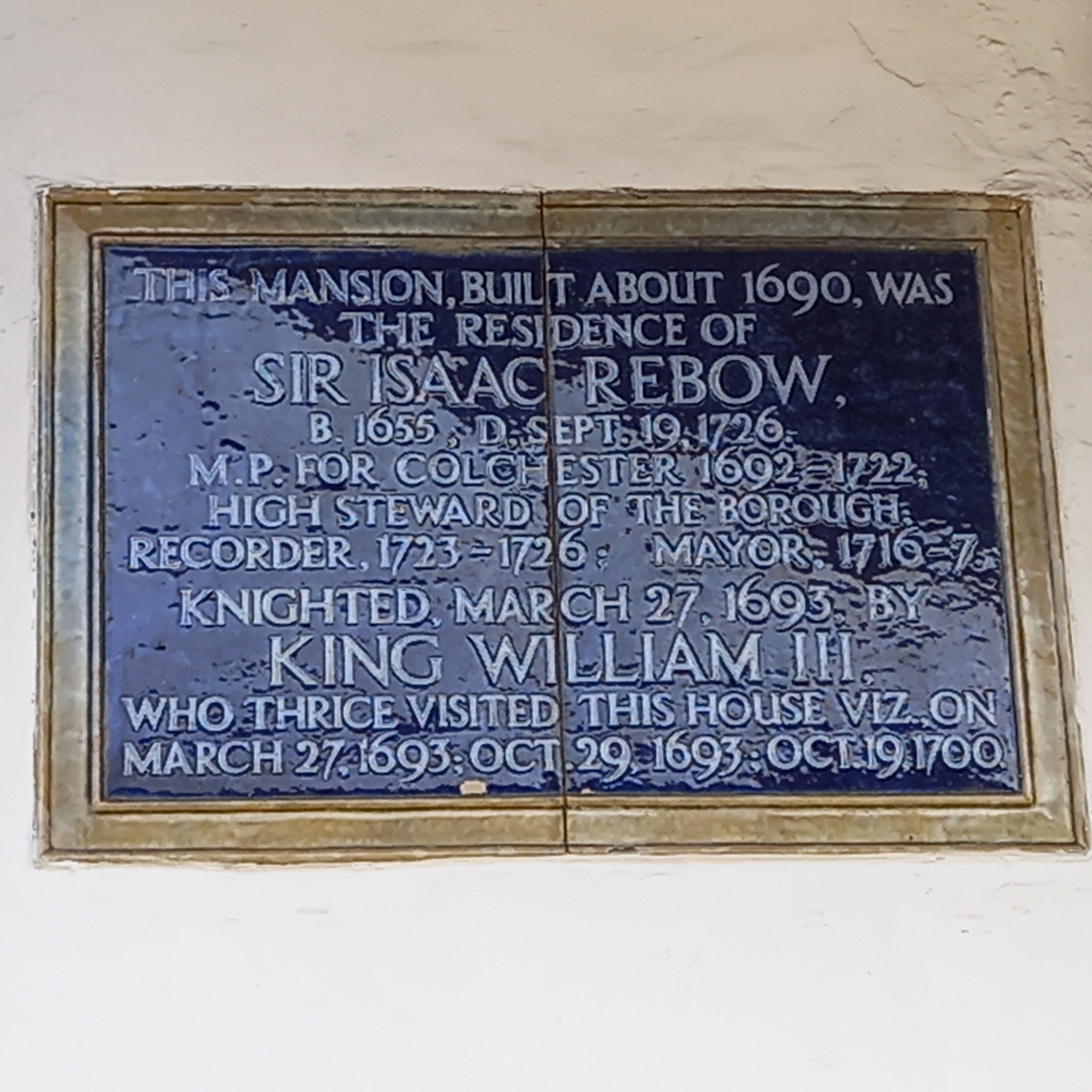
Plaque at Rebow House

Rebow split his time between two main homes, one in Colchester and one on Pall Mall, Westminster. He is also known to have inhabited 13 Soho Square, Westminster from 1696 to at least 1703.

Daniel Defoe described Rebow's home in Head Street, Colchester as a "very good house". It was built in the late seventeenth century (possibly incorporating some timber framing from an earlier property) above medieval cellars, which he may have used to store goods as part of his mercantile activities. An inventory of the house produced in June 1735, nine years after Rebow's death, lists seventeen rooms, two servants' garrets, cellars, a brewhouse, yards, a stable and a coach house. An illustration on James Deane's 1745 map of Colchester depicts the house with a substantially different façade to that now visible, showing a low attic, a large central dormer and three windows each side of the central axis, rather than the current two. A 2016 assessment of the building's fabric found features consistent with this depiction, but it has also been claimed that it may show an unbuilt design for the rebuilding of the house, abandoned when the Rebow family moved to Wivenhoe Park. The house's present façade and oriel window date from the eighteenth or early nineteenth century, with shopfronts inserted in the late nineteenth century and the original rusticated entrance door surround removed in the mid twentieth century. Panelling and fireplaces contemporary with Rebow are still in situ inside the house. It is now a Grade II* listed building known as Rebow House and, following a restoration completed in 2021 by its current owners, the Tollgate Partnership, comprises three offices and a shop. Wallpaper dating back to the 1700s which was found during the restoration has been framed and left visible. The 1745 map show substantial gardens behind the house, subsequently built on. To the south, running parallel with the side of the house and the site of its gardens, lies Sir Isaac's Walk, a road which Rebow "gravelled and made handsome" according to the eighteenth century historian Philip Morant.

In July 1717 two men were tried at the Old Bailey on charges of theft from Rebow's London home. His footman, James Owen, was convicted of the theft of books, gold and silver lace, cloth coats, money and other goods on 1 June, sentenced to death and executed. A relative, who is recorded variously under the names Elizabeth Crawley, Rebecca Alston and Rebecca Crawley in the court records, pled not guilty to buying and receiving stolen goods, but after being held in prison for six months changed her plea as a result of her landlord seizing her goods, evicting her husband and children, and not having sufficient resources to stage her defence. Another man, John Cook, was proved to have stolen a silver sugar dish, a diamond ring, a silver salver and other goods in January, but was discharged as a result of the Act of Grace introduced by George I after the offence was committed.

== Death and legacy ==
In December 1714, Rebow had been seriously ill and thought "like to die", but survived to live for over a decade longer. He died on 19 September 1726 and is buried in St Mary-at-the-Walls in Colchester, where he is commemorated on the monument he had erected to his father. In his will he requested to be "privately buried" at about 11pm "without any funeral pomp".

=== Will ===
His son Lemyng Rebow having predeceased him, Rebow left most of his estate to the youngest of Lemyng's two sons, Isaac Lemyng Rebow. This included most of his landholdings in Essex, Kent, Suffolk and Middlesex, and a "great diamond ring". Charles Chamberlain Rebow (the elder of Lemyng's sons) was left only Colchester Castle (and, if certain conditions were met, some of the contents of Rebow's Colchester home) on account of his being a "disobedient and undutiful grandson". He left his daughter Susan, Lady Bacon his Pall Mall residence (on the condition that she paid his executors £300), her mother's diamond necklace and portrait and £2000 (in addition to her marriage portion of £8000). His other surviving daughter, Mary Thurston, was left her mother's pearl necklace, and her children Thomas, Joseph, Mary and Ann received £1000 each (Joseph's sum was increased from £600 in a codicil, subject to conditions). Other bequests included money for Colchester's Dutch Church, for the poor of the parish of St Mary-on-the-Walls and for the upkeep of his father's monument there.

=== Political dynasty ===
Three later members of the Rebow family went on to be MPs for Colchester. Two were direct descendants - his grandson Isaac Lemyng Rebow from 1734 to 1735 and his great-grandson Isaac Martin Rebow from 1755 to 1781. Under the terms of Sir Isaac Rebow's will, in the absence of male descendants, the husbands of female descendants had to adopt the surname Rebow in order to inherit the family estates. This was the case for John Gurdon Rebow (the husband of his great-great-great-granddaughter Mary Martin Slater Rebow), MP for Colchester from 1857 to 1859 and 1865 to 1870.

== Notes ==
Parliament of England
Preceded by Sir Walter Clarges; Nathaniel Lawrence	Colchester; 1689–1690; With: Samuel Reynolds	Succeeded by Samuel Reynolds; Edward Cary
Preceded by Samuel Reynolds; Edward Cary	Colchester; 1692–1707; With: Samuel Reynolds (1692-1694); Sir Thomas Cooke (1694-1695); Sir John Morden (1695-1698); Sir Thomas Cooke (1698-1705); Edward Bullock (1705); Sir Thomas Webster (1705-1707)	Succeeded by Parliament of England abolished
Parliament of Great Britain
Preceded by Parliament of Great Britain created	Colchester; 1708–1714; With: Sir Thomas Webster (1708-1711); William Gore (1711-1713); Sir Thomas Webster (1713-1714)	Succeeded by Sir Thomas Webster; Nicholas Corsellis
Preceded by Sir Thomas Webster; Nicholas Corsellis	Colchester; 1715–1722; With: Richard Du Cane	Succeeded by Sir Thomas Webster; Matthew Martin
