= Sir Thomas Webster, 1st Baronet =

British landowner and Whig politician

Sir Thomas Webster, 1st Baronet (1679 – 30 May 1751), of Copped Hall, Essex, and Battle Abbey, Sussex, was a British landowner and Whig politician who sat in the English and British House of Commons between 1705 and 1727.

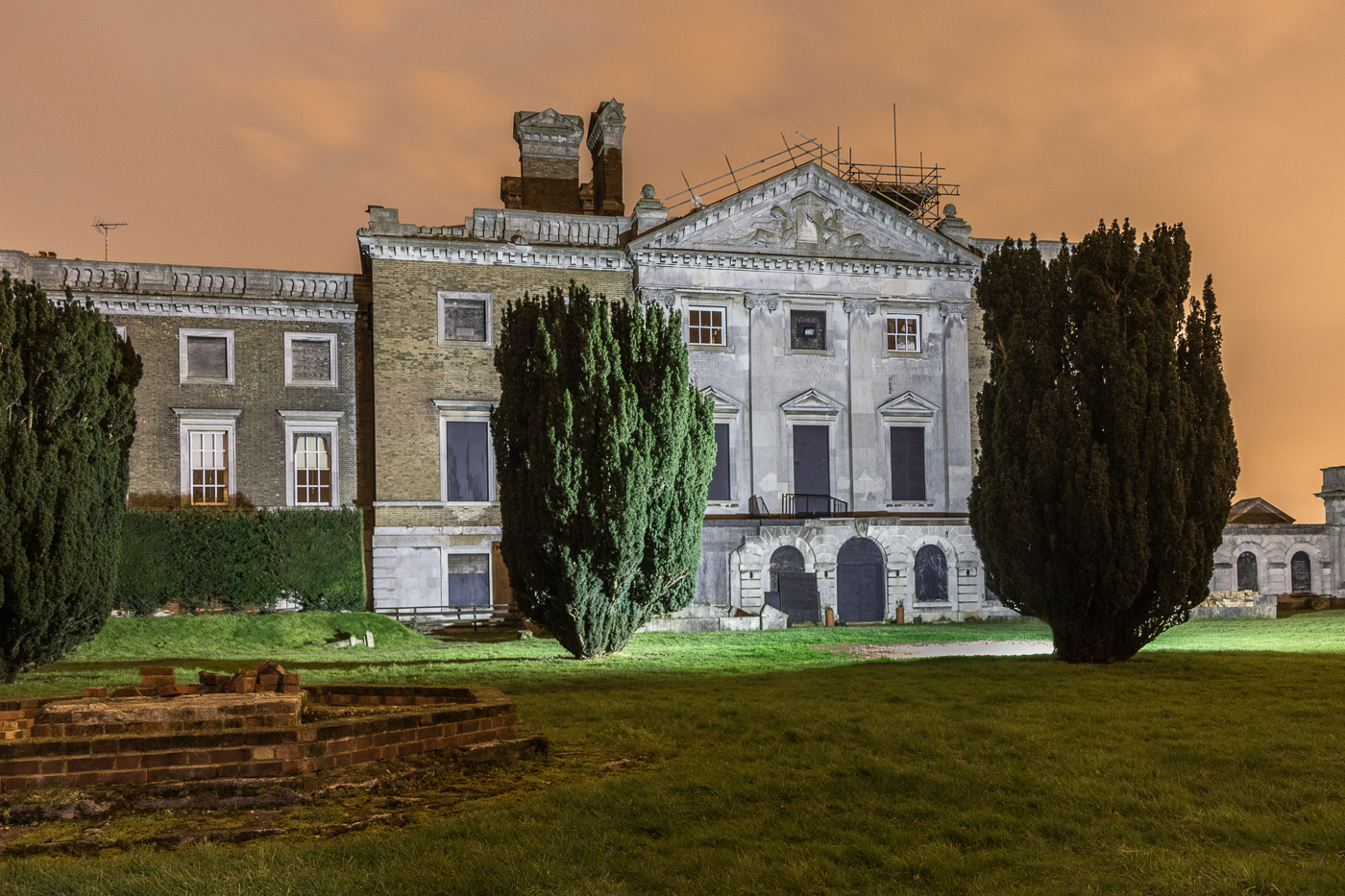
Copped Hall

Webster was the eldest son of Sir Godfrey Webster, a well-to-do clothier of Fenchurch St., London, and the Nelmes, Havering, Essex and educated at the Middle Temple from 1697. On 2 October 1701, he married Jane Cheek, the daughter and heiress of Edward Cheek of Sandford Orcas, Somerset and his wife Mary Whistler. She was the daughter and co-heiress of the wealthy merchant Henry Whistler (who died in 1718), from whom a fortune descended to the Webster family, which they acknowledged by using Whistler as a Christian name in the Webster family. In 1703 he purchased the estate of Copped Hall in Essex for over £20,000 from Charles Sackville, 6th Earl of Dorset and was created a Baronet the same year. He also served as High Sheriff of Essex for the year 1703 to 1704.

Webster was elected the Whig Member of Parliament for Colchester at a by-election on 18 December 1705. He was returned again for Colchester at the 1708 British general election. He was appointed to the commission for the London lieutenancy in 1708, and stood for election as an alderman for Portsoken ward, but was defeated at the poll to secure nomination by a large margin. In Parliament, he voted for the naturalization of the Palatines in 1709, and for the impeachment of Dr Sacheverell in 1710. At the 1710 British general election he was again returned for Colchester but was unseated on petition on 27 January 1711. He was returned again in a contest at the 1713 British general election but was again unseated on petition in 1714 after a dispute over the generous creation of Freemen, who had the right to vote, by the Whig dominated council. He was, however, re-elected at the 1722 British general election, representing the borough until 1727.

He was appointed verderer of Waltham Forest from 1718 until his death. In 1721 he purchased Battle Abbey from Anthony Browne, 6th Viscount Montagu.

Webster died on 30 May 1751. He and his wife had two sons and three daughters. He was succeeded by his son Sir Whistler Webster, 2nd Baronet, who also became an MP. His daughter Abigail married William Northey, MP. The published catalogue of the Muniments of Battle Abbey (1835) notes (p. 199) that Sir Thomas's son and heir Whistler Webster's share of Henry Whistler's property, "independent of what he derived from his father, Sir Thomas" was £68,000.

Parliament of Great Britain
Preceded by Edward Bullock; Sir Isaac Rebow	Member of Parliament for Colchester; 1705–1711; With: Sir Isaac Rebow	Succeeded by Sir Isaac Rebow; William Gore
Preceded by William Gore; Sir Isaac Rebow	Member of Parliament for Colchester; 1713–1714; With: Sir Isaac Rebow	Succeeded by William Gore; Nicholas Corsellis
Preceded by Richard Du Cane; Sir Isaac Rebow	Member of Parliament for Colchester; 1722–1727; With: Matthew Martin	Succeeded by Stamp Brooksbank; Samuel Tufnell
Baronetage of England
New creation	Baronet (of Copthall); 1703–1751	Succeeded by Whistler Webster
