= William Gore (died 1739) =

British financier and Tory politician

William Gore (c. 1675–1739) of Tring Park, Hertfordshire, was a British financier and Tory politician who sat in the House of Commons between 1711 and 1739.

Gore was the eldest son of Sir William Gore, Lord Mayor of London and his wife, Elizabeth Hampton. He was admitted at Queens' College, Cambridge in 1691. In 1708, he succeeded his father to Tring Park. He married Lady Mary Compton, daughter of George Compton, 4th Earl of Northampton in April 1709.

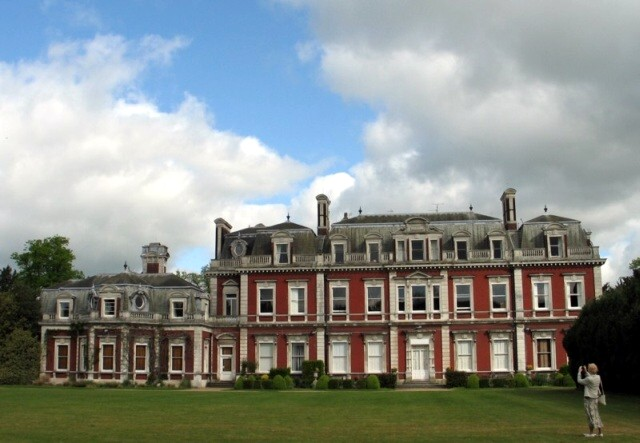
Tring Park Mansion (southern face)

Gore was a Director of the Bank of England from 1709 to 1712, and a Director of the South Sea Company from 1712 to 1715. He was a Tory and a member of the October Club and stood for Parliament at Colchester at the 1710 general election. He was initially defeated in the poll, but was seated on petition as Member of Parliament for Colchester on 27 January 1711. After the 1713 general election, he was again seated on petition on 6 May 1714. He did not stand in 1715.

In 1718, Gore bought the manor of Cricklade, which allowed him to appoint the returning officer there. At the 1722 general election, he successfully contested St Albans. His only recorded speech was in April 1727, when he spoke against a vote of credit. He did not stand at the 1727 general election. In 1734, he was returned on his own interest as MP for Cricklade.

Gore died on 22 October 1739, leaving five sons and six daughters. His daughter Anne married Charles Pelham and Dorothy was the mother of William Mellish. Two of his brothers, John and Thomas Gore were also MPs.

Parliament of Great Britain
Preceded by Sir Thomas Webster, Bt; Sir Isaac Rebow	Member of Parliament for Colchester; 1711–1713; With: Sir Isaac Rebow	Succeeded by Sir Thomas Webster, Bt; Sir Isaac Rebow
Preceded by Sir Thomas Webster, Bt; Sir Isaac Rebow	Member of Parliament for Colchester; 1714–1715; With: Nicholas Corsellis	Succeeded by Richard Du Cane; Sir Isaac Rebow
Preceded by Joshua Lomax; William Grimston	Member of Parliament for St Albans; 1722–1727; With: William Clayton	Succeeded by The Viscount Grimston; Caleb Lomax
Preceded by Sir Thomas Reade; Christopher Tilson	Member of Parliament for Cricklade; 1734–1739; With: Sir Thomas Reade	Succeeded by Sir Thomas Reade; Charles Gore
