= Sir Thomas Cooke =

English politician (c. 1648 – 1709)

Member of Parliament for Colchester
- In office 19 November 1694 – 1695 Serving with Isaac Rebow
- Preceded by: Samuel Reynolds
- Succeeded by: Sir John Morden, 1st Baronet
- In office 1698–1705 Serving with Isaac Rebow
- Preceded by: Sir John Morden, 1st Baronet
- Succeeded by: Edward Bullock

Personal details
- Born: c. 1648
- Died: 6 September 1709
- Party: Tory
- Spouse: Elizabeth Horne (m. 7 February 1672)
- Children: 6
- Parent: Thomas Cooke (father)

Sir Thomas Cooke (c. 1648 – 6 September 1709) was a Tory politician and governor of the East India Company. He served two terms as MP for Colchester from 19 November 1694 till 1695 and 1698 till 1705.

== Biography ==
Sir Thomas Cooke was born around 1648; he was the son of Thomas Cooke. He married Elizabeth Horne on 7 February 1672.

In February–March 1681, Cooke ran for the constituency of Truro and was defeated by the Whig candidate Sir Henry Ashurst.

In 1690, Cooke was nominated as Sheriff of London and, in 1692, elected as alderman of Queenhithe. In 1693, he ran in a London mayoral election and lost.

In 1702, Cooke was appointed colonel of the City of London's Blue Regiment. He ran for the London mayorship in 1703 and lost; he was then elected the following year but declined the position due to health concerns. He ran for Southwark in 1690 alongside the Tory politician Sir Peter Rich and donated money to support French and Irish Protestant refugees.

Cooke was elected to the Royal African Company and became sub-governor in 1690, a position from which he earned his knighthood on 15 September, and in 1692, he was made governor of the company. In 1694, he had been elected sheriff of London and MP for Colchester in a by-election.

Cooke faced accusations of corruption and was temporarily imprisoned inside the Tower of London. It later emerged that he had tried to buy off interlopers, distributing over £80,000 worth of bribes in 1693.

Cooke's reputation was tarnished after an investigation into a scandal involving bribes. As a result of the scandal, William III dissolved Parliament in October 1695. Cooke was re-elected as MP for Colchester, but the results were disputed, and Parliament ruled in favour of his opponent, Sir John Morden, 1st Bt.

In 1696, he was reappointed to the Treasury Committee, and by 1698, he regained a position on the board of the East India Company. In July 1698, Parliament was dissolved, and Cooke was re-elected for Colchester without any opposition. In 1700, he was re-elected governor of the East India Company following the death of Sir Josiah Child.

On 6 September 1709, he suffered a fit of apoplexy and died.
