= Copped Hall =

Grade II listed historic house in Epping Upland, England

Coordinates: 51°41′37″N 0°04′04″E

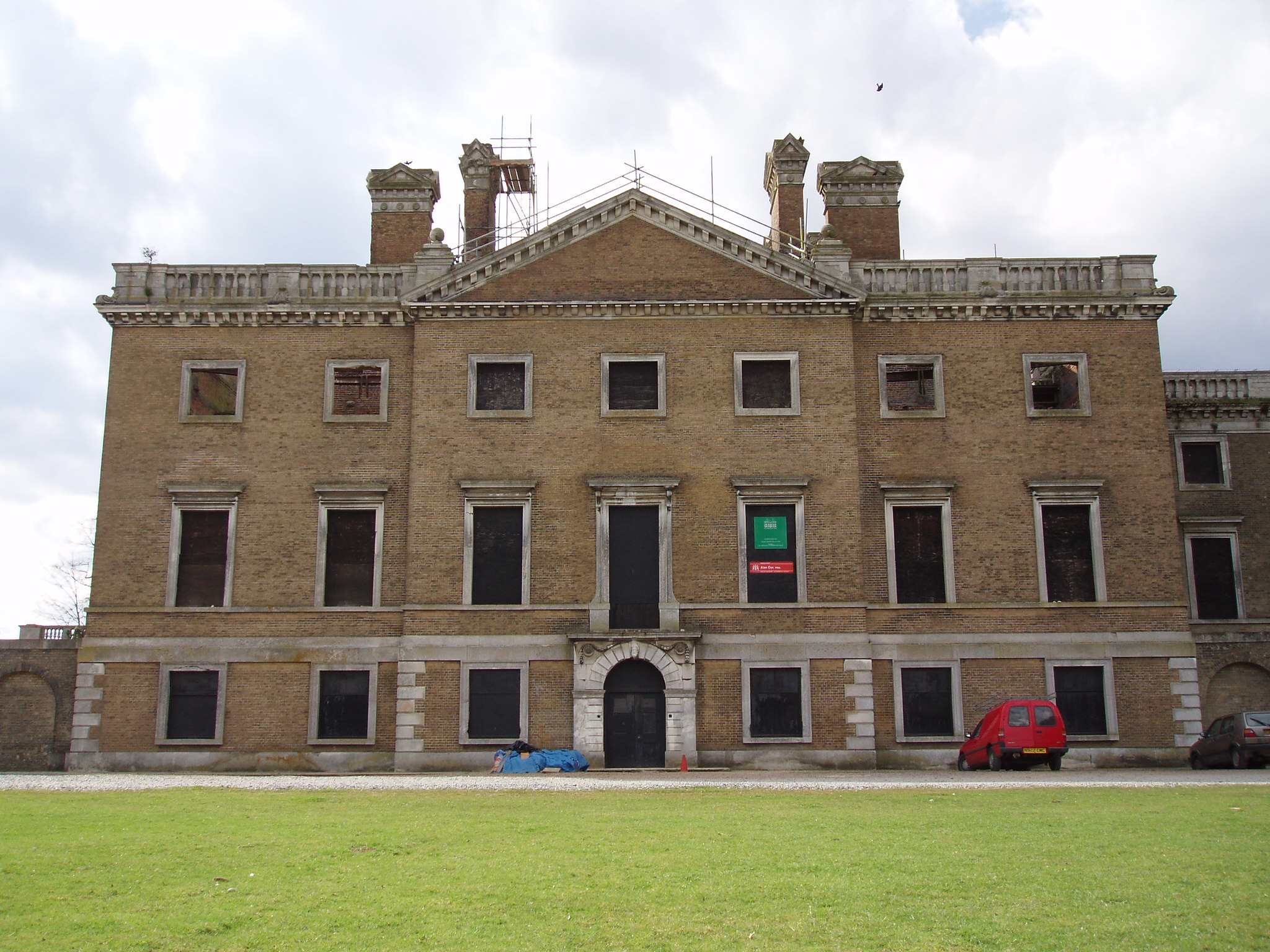
- Centre of east front

- Location within Essex
- Established: 1995; 31 years ago (purchase by a trust and opened to the public)
- Location: Epping, Essex; Essex; United Kingdom
- Type: General interest museum. Restoration of historic building.
- Collections: Georgian
- Chairperson: Alan Cox
- Owner: The Copped Hall Trust
- Public transit access: Epping +40 minute walk
- Parking: On site
- Website: Official website

Copped Hall
- Interactive map of Copped Hall

History
- Built: 1751; 275 years ago
- Original use: House

Listed Building – Grade II
- Designated: 1984
- Reference no.: 1337306

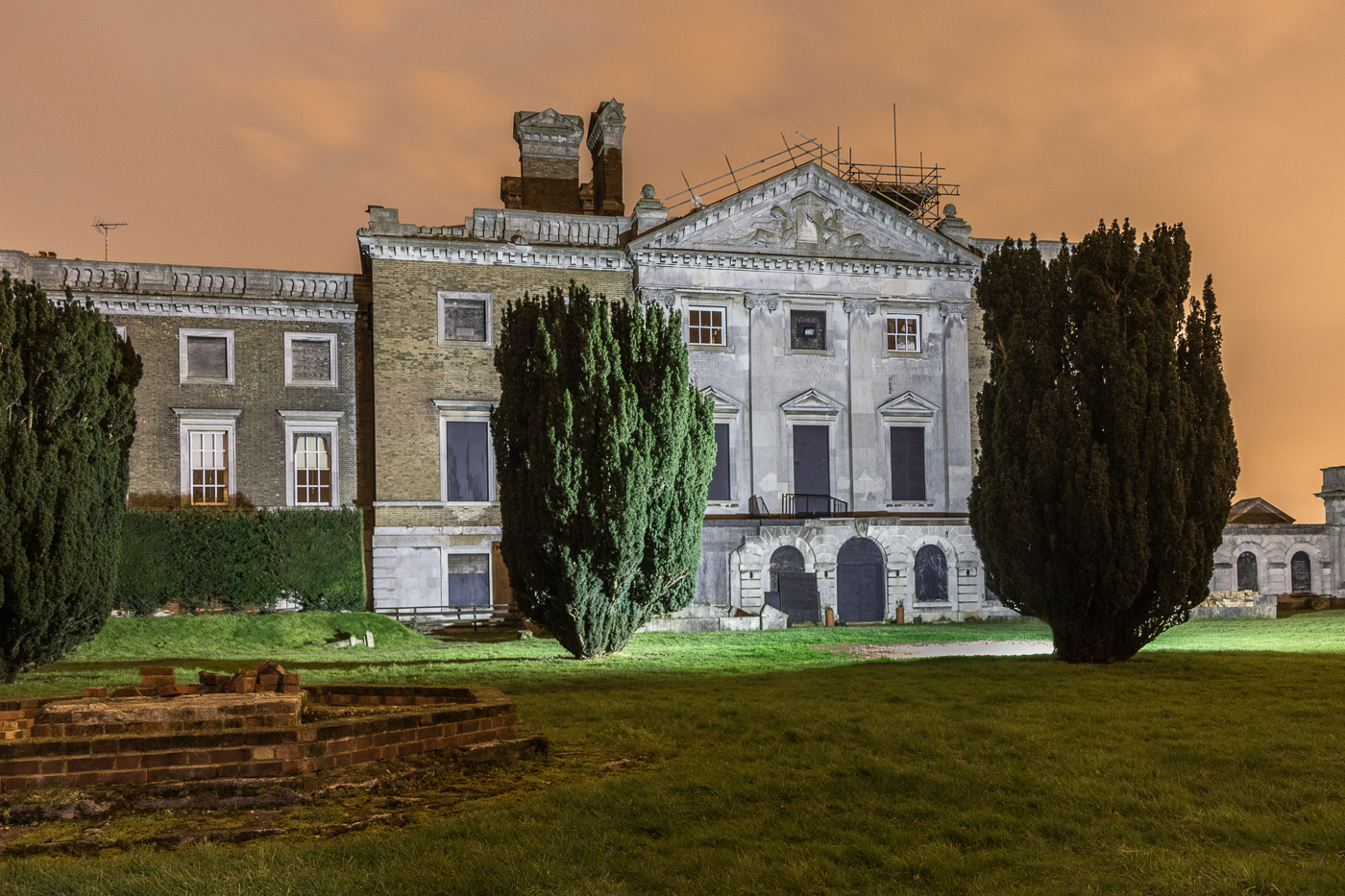
Copped Hall west front

Copped Hall, also known as Copt Hall or Copthall, is a mid-18th-century English country house in Epping Upland, Essex which has been undergoing restoration since 1999. Today, Copped Hall refers to the upstanding house, while Copt Hall or Copthall refer to the older Tudor and earlier houses. Copped Hall is visible from the M25 motorway between junctions 26 and 27.

== History ==
=== Foundation ===
King Richard I bestowed the lands on Richard Fitz Aucher to hold them in fee, and hereditarily of the Abbey. During the reign of Edward I Copthall continued in the possession of the Fitz Aucher family until it came into the hands of the Abbot until the Dissolution of the Monasteries by King Henry VIII. In 1548 Edward VI granted Copthall to his sister, the future Queen Mary.

=== Heyday ===
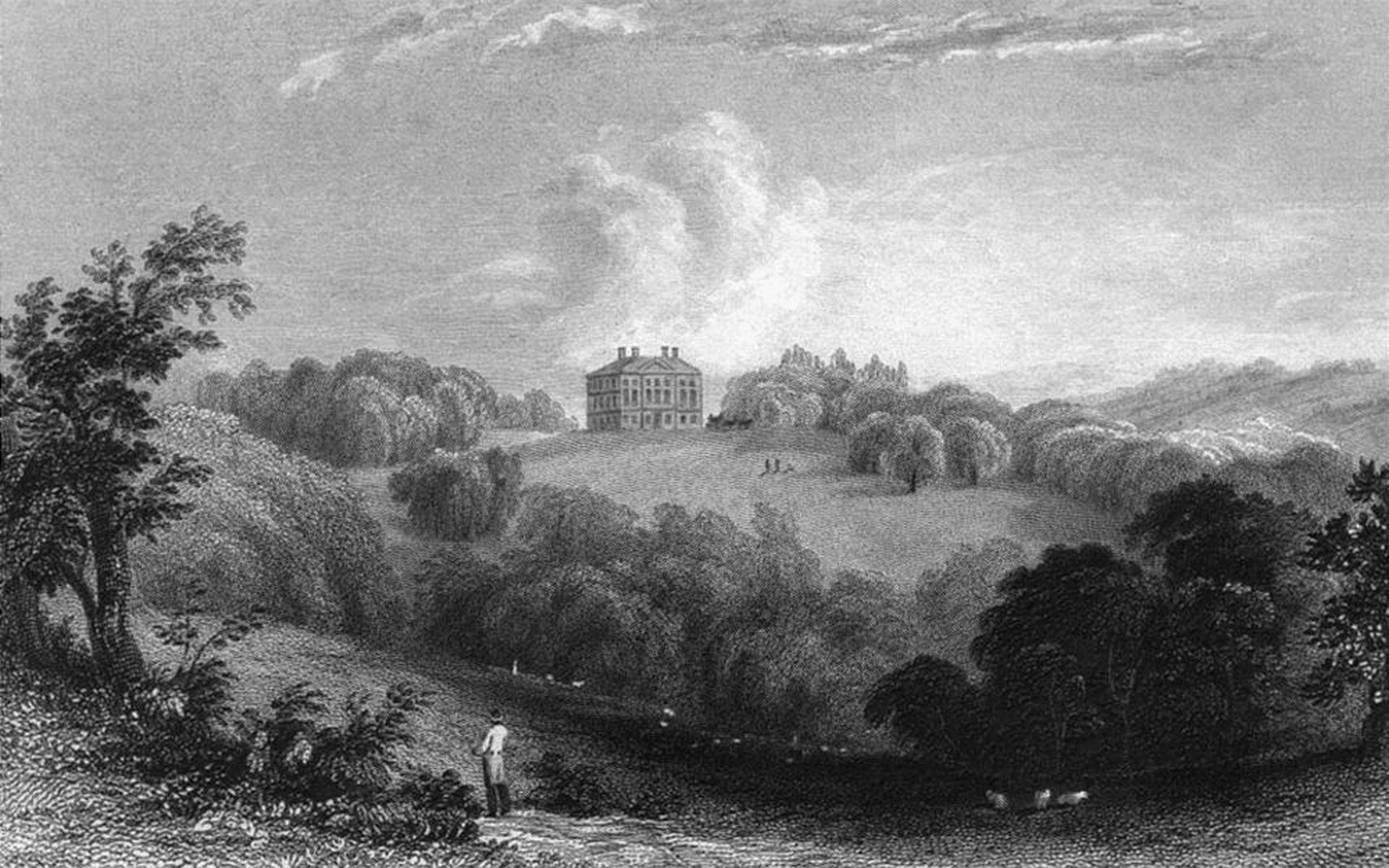
In the early 19th century

Sir Thomas Heneage received the estate of Copthall on 13 August 1564 from Queen Elizabeth I, where he subsequently built an elaborate mansion. The Queen was a frequent visitor to Essex and she is recorded as having visited Heneage at Copthall in 1575. His daughter, afterwards Countess of Winchelsea, sold it to the Earl of Middlesex in the reign of James I. From him it passed to Charles Sackville, Earl of Dorset, who sold it in 1701 to Sir Thomas Webster, Bt.

Edward Conyers purchased the estate in 1739, but he only owned the house for three years before dying in 1742. Conyers' son John (1717-1775) inherited the property and considered repairing the original Hall as it had become dilapidated. However, in the end he decided to build a new house on a different site. This was built between 1751 and 1758 after demolishing the old one around 1748.

The Georgian house, a large structure set in landscaped parkland, "has long been celebrated as one of the principal ornament of the country". The gardens of the main house have a ha-ha (a disguised ditch), which allows animals to approach yet prevents them from entering. It was a good example of the '18th-century house in landscape'. The mansion was placed overlooking two valleys with a third valley to the north. The building was well proportioned, with the chimneys built in a tight geometric arrangement.

The next member of the family to inherit Copped Hall was his son John Conyers (1748-1818), who extensively altered the house.

=== Decline ===
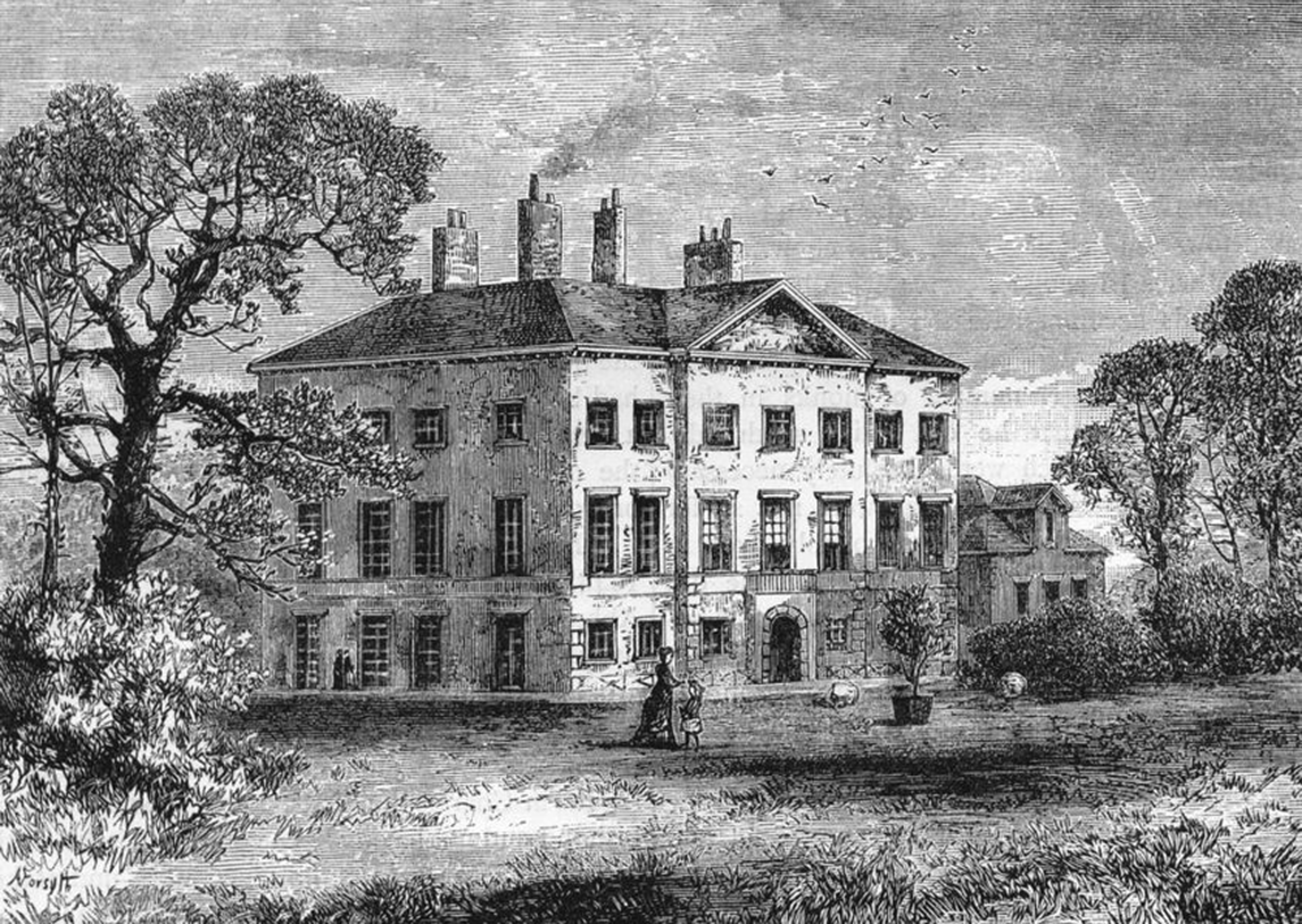
In the 1880s

His son, Henry John Conyers (1782–1853), was said to be so obsessed with hunting that he neglected the house. He was survived by three daughters. The house was finally sold by the family in 1869. It was bought by George Wythes (1811-1883), who had made his fortune in civil engineering, building railways around the world.

Country Life magazine ran two articles on Copped Hall in 1910, illustrated with many photographs.

The main house was gutted in an accidental fire one Sunday morning in 1917 which was caused by an electrical fault.

The Wythes family, who were the then occupiers, moved into Wood House on the estate. Ernest Wythes died in 1949 and his wife died in 1951. Around 1950 the estate was sold, after which followed a period of total neglect, see Destruction of country houses in 20th-century Britain. The main 18th-century house was first stripped of its more desirable building materials then left to deteriorate. The orangery was blown up as an army training exercise in the 1960s. All the statues in the gardens were sold and removed to other large estate houses; some ended up in Anglesey Abbey in Cambridgeshire. Nineteen stone obelisks were purchased by the renowned diarist Sir Henry ‘Chips’ Channon and moved to Kelvedon Hall near, Brentwood, Essex. A gazebo from the garden was set up in the grounds of St Paul's Walden Bury.

In 1995, the derelict shell of the main house was used as a location for the music video for I Can't Be with You by The Cranberries.

=== Restoration ===
In 1995 the Copped Hall Trust acquired the freehold of the house, ancillary buildings and gardens, all of which they are slowly restoring. The house can be visited on certain days, with progress being made to replicate its Georgian décor. The surrounding parkland is now owned by the Conservators of Epping Forest, the City of London.

On 27 April 2004 Charles, Prince of Wales, accompanied by the Lord Lieutenant of Essex, Lord Petre, visited Copped Hall and inspected the restoration work. The Prince opened an exhibition of 18th-century botanical water-colours in the new temporary gallery. These water-colours were painted by Matilda Conyers, the daughter of John Conyers, who built Copped Hall.

The West Essex Archaeology Group (WEAG) hold annual excavations at a site in the Copped Hall grounds. These largely focus on the earthwork remains of the Tudor house, which predates the standing Georgian house. The digs comprise archaeology weekends for those with little experience, and a five-day field school for the more experienced.

=== Wood House ===
Wood House is a 19th-century home on the Copped Hall estate, built in 1895 by Ernest James Wythes. He moved here from the main Copped Hall house when much of the Palladian mansion was destroyed by fire in 1917 and during its rebuilding, though subsequently remaining at Wood House. Singer Rod Stewart lived in the property for a number of years before selling it in March 2019 for just over £4 million. It was purchased by former reality television star Billi Mucklow and footballer Andy Carroll, though the couple would split in 2024, with only the former currently living at the residence.

=== Apple ===
In 2025 an apple was named for the hall and the name was accredited in 2025 RLC10 meeting for roadside seedling based on DNA sample: A5729

The apple is a Small Late season (February) crunchy eater, Flat-round often lopsided so it may be oval in equatorial section. It has Dry, smooth skin, pale green (shaded side), with some small area of pale orange red flush on the (very) sunny side

== Gallery ==
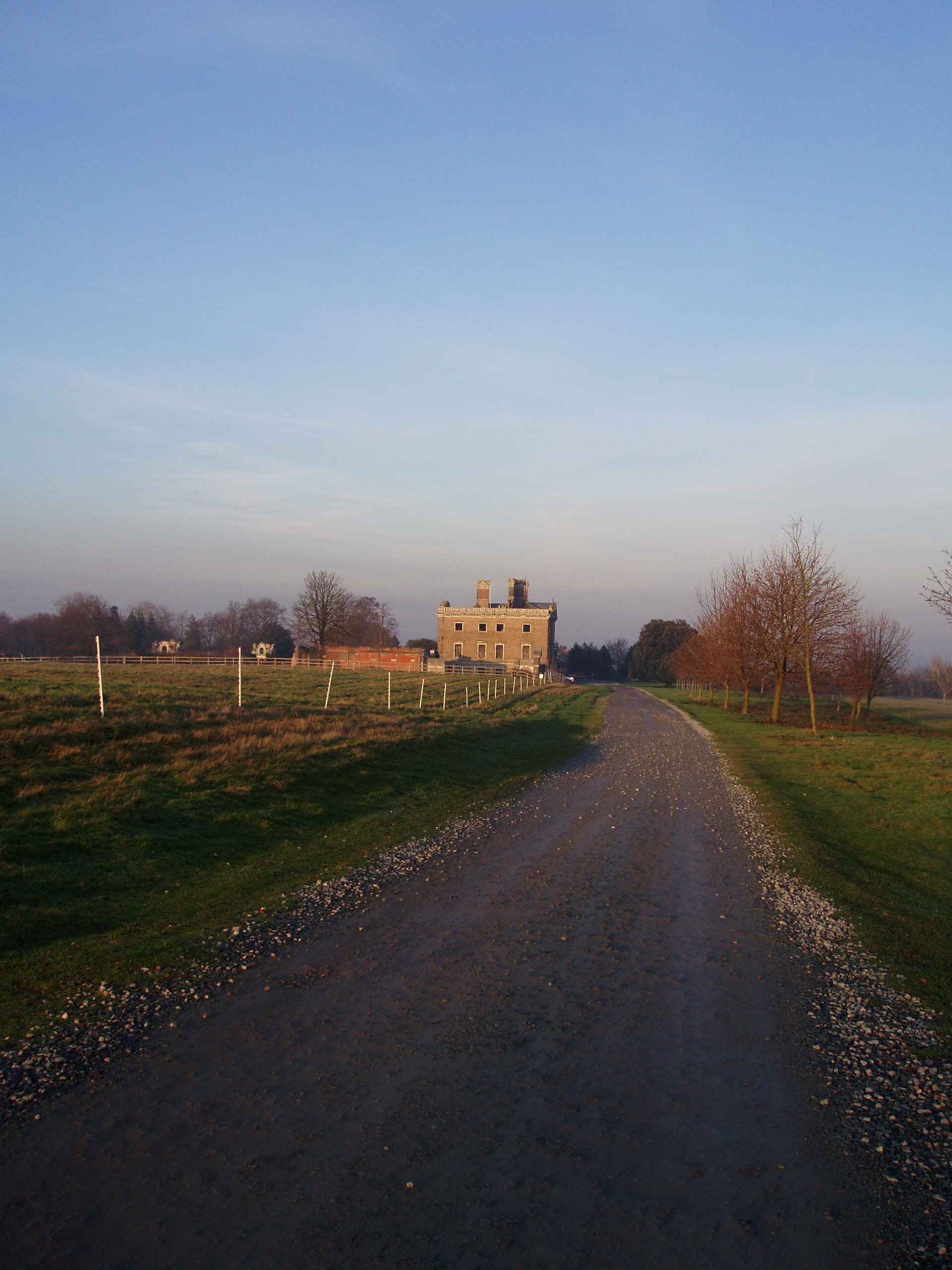
Copped Hall from the south (December 2006)

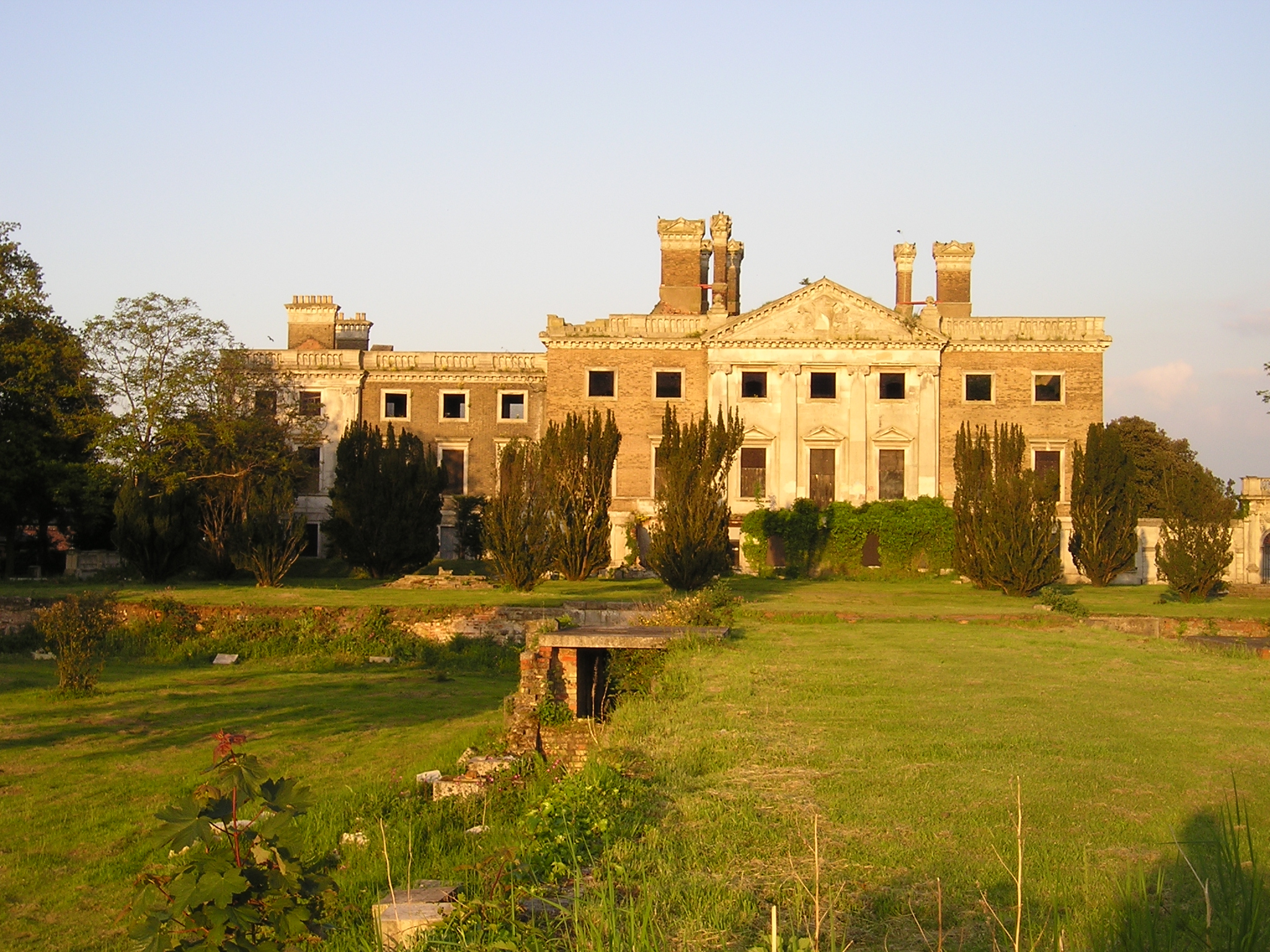
View from the west (May 2004)

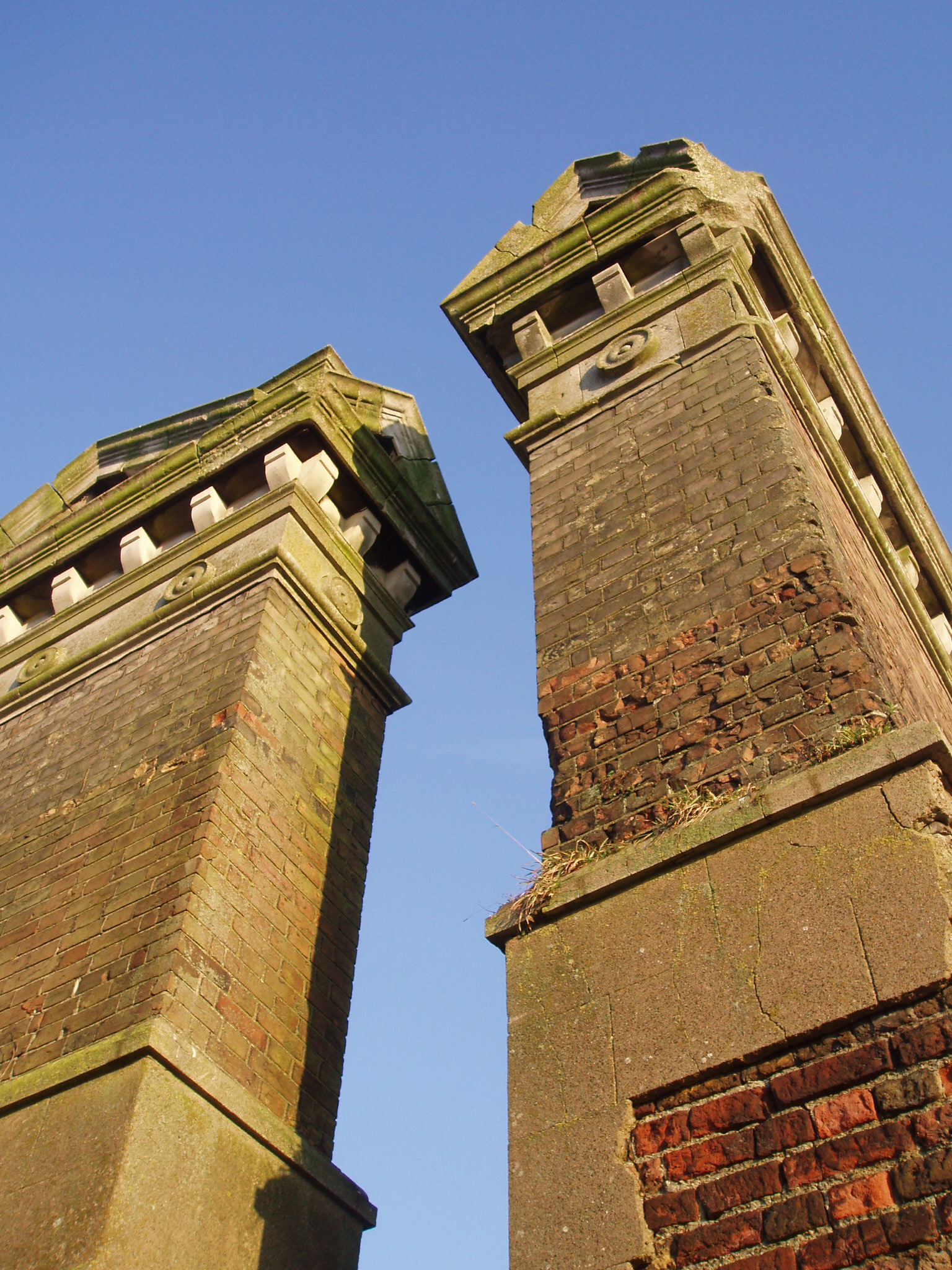
Closeup of the chimneys (December 2006)

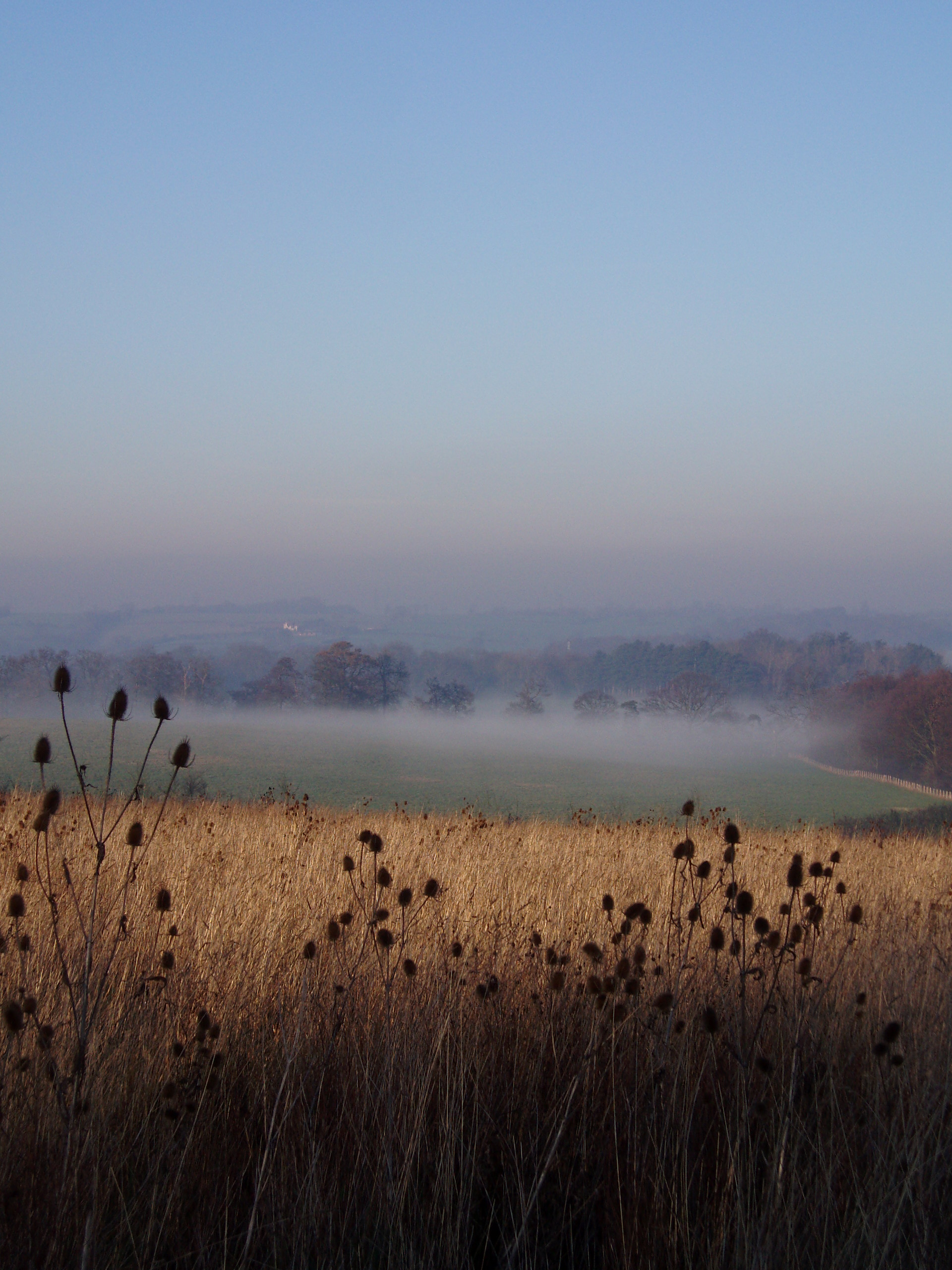
A view of the estate (December 2006)

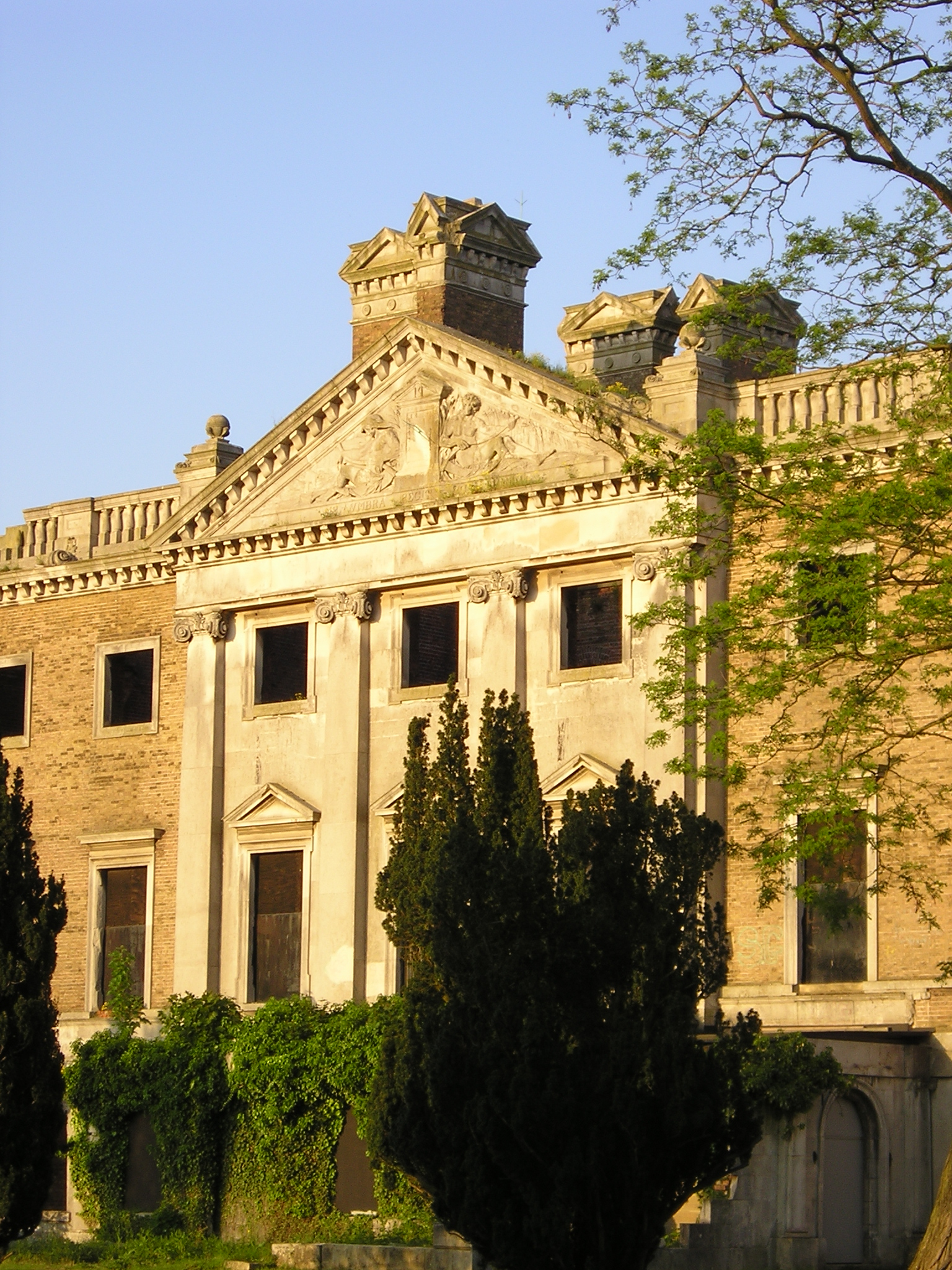
Closeup of west elevation (May 2004)

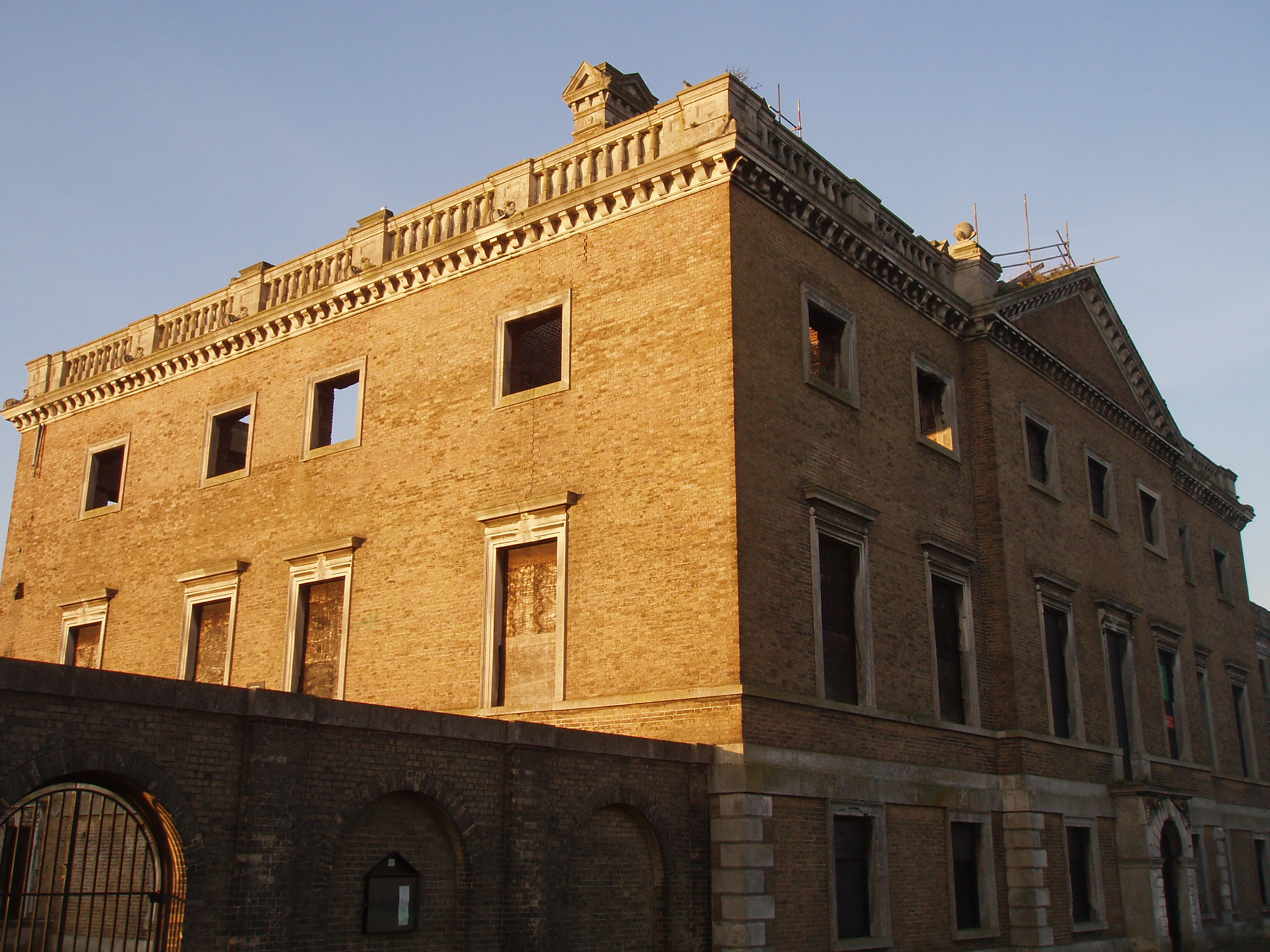
South-eastern corner (December 2006)

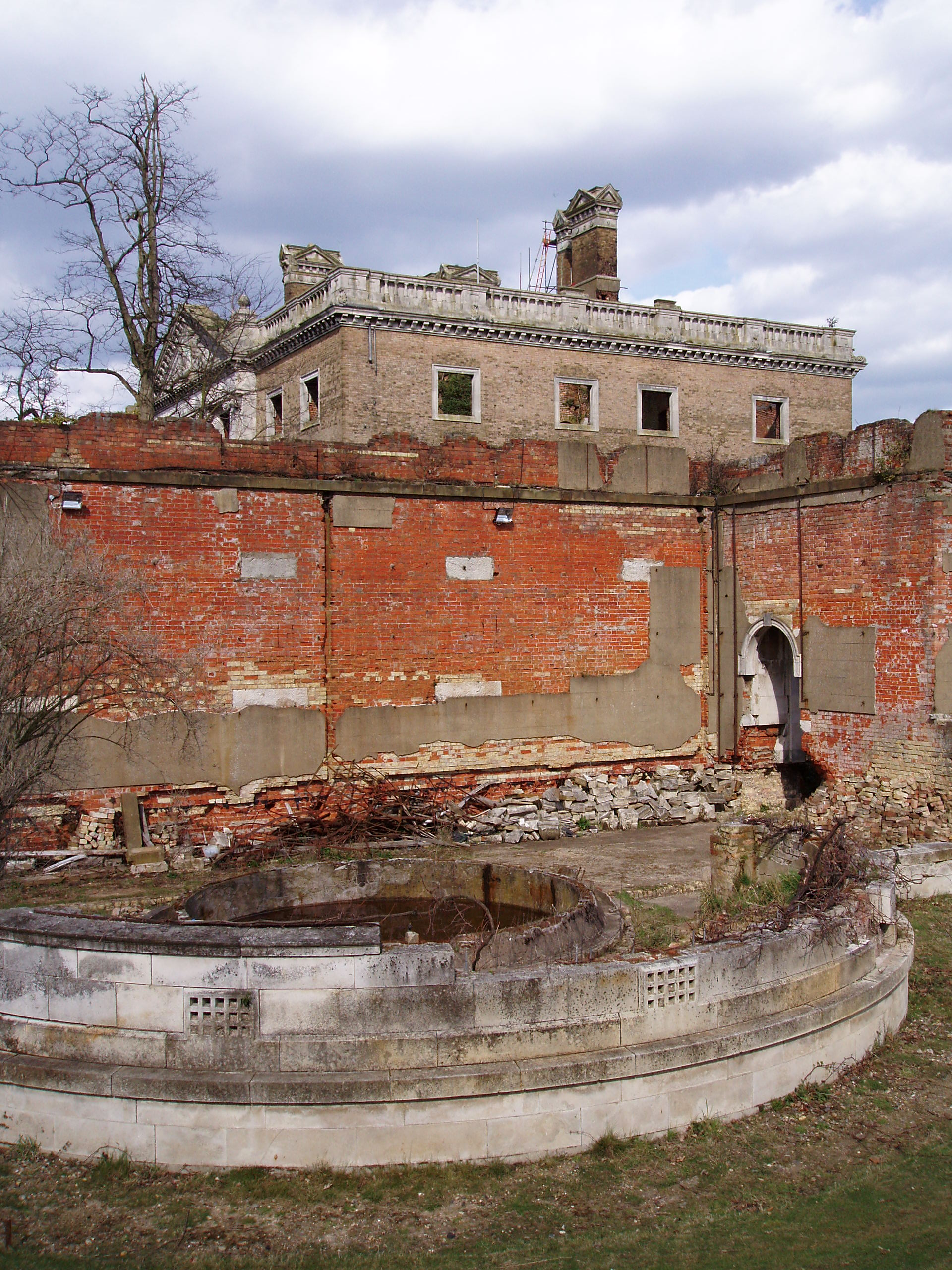
Remains of the orangery (April 2006)
