= Matthew Martin (mariner) =

Matthew Martin (1676-1749) of Alresford Hall, Essex, was an East India Company mariner and politician who sat in the House of Commons between 1722 and 1742.

Martin was christened at St Mary's Church, Wivenhoe, on 17 May 1676, the second son of Samuel Martine (1640-1694) of Wivenhoe who was a mariner. In about 1702, he married Sarah Jones, daughter of Samuel Jones, who was commander of an East Indiaman. In 1710 his mother and his brother Samuel both died and he inherited the family property at Wivenhoe.

Martin was a captain in the service of the East India Company, and commanded the Marlborough Indiaman which sailed to India and China between 1711 and 1721. In 1712 after defending it against three French war ships, he brought his ship safely into Fort St. George with a cargo worth £200,000. The Company gave him a reward of £1,000 and a gold medal set with 24 large diamonds. He purchased Alresford Hall, near Colchester, in 1720 and was granted a patent of arms on 18 Sept. 1722. He was an elder brother of Trinity House by 1720 and was a director of the East India Company from 1722 to 1729.

At the 1722 general election Martin was elected as a Whig Member of Parliament for Colchester. In 1726 he was mayor of Colchester. He did not stand at the 1727 general election. From 1732 to 1740 he was again a Director of the East India Company. He was returned unopposed at MP for Colchester at the 1734 general election and voted with the Administration on the Spanish convention in 1739 . He was re-elected at the poll in a contest for Colchester at the 1741 general election, but was unseated on petition on 26 February 1742. In 1746 he was appointed High steward of Colchester.

Martin died on 20 July 1749 and was buried in the family vault at St Peter's Church, Alresford. He had five sons and three daughters, not all of whom survived. Of his sons, Thomas became a barrister, Samuel inherited Wivenhoe, and George became a mariner. His surviving daughters were Sarah, and Mary who married Isaac Lemyng Rebow with whom Martin was returned at the 1734 general election.

Parliament of Great Britain
Preceded by Richard Du Cane; Sir Isaac Rebow	Member of Parliament for Colchester; 1722–1727; With: Sir Thomas Webster	Succeeded by Stamp Brooksbank; Samuel Tufnell
Preceded by Stamp Brooksbank; Samuel Tufnell	Member of Parliament for Colchester; 1734– 1742; With: Isaac Lemyng Rebow 1734-1735; Jacob Houblon 1735-1741; John Olmius 1741-1742	Succeeded by Samuel Savill; Charles Gray
