= Morden College =

Charity in London, England

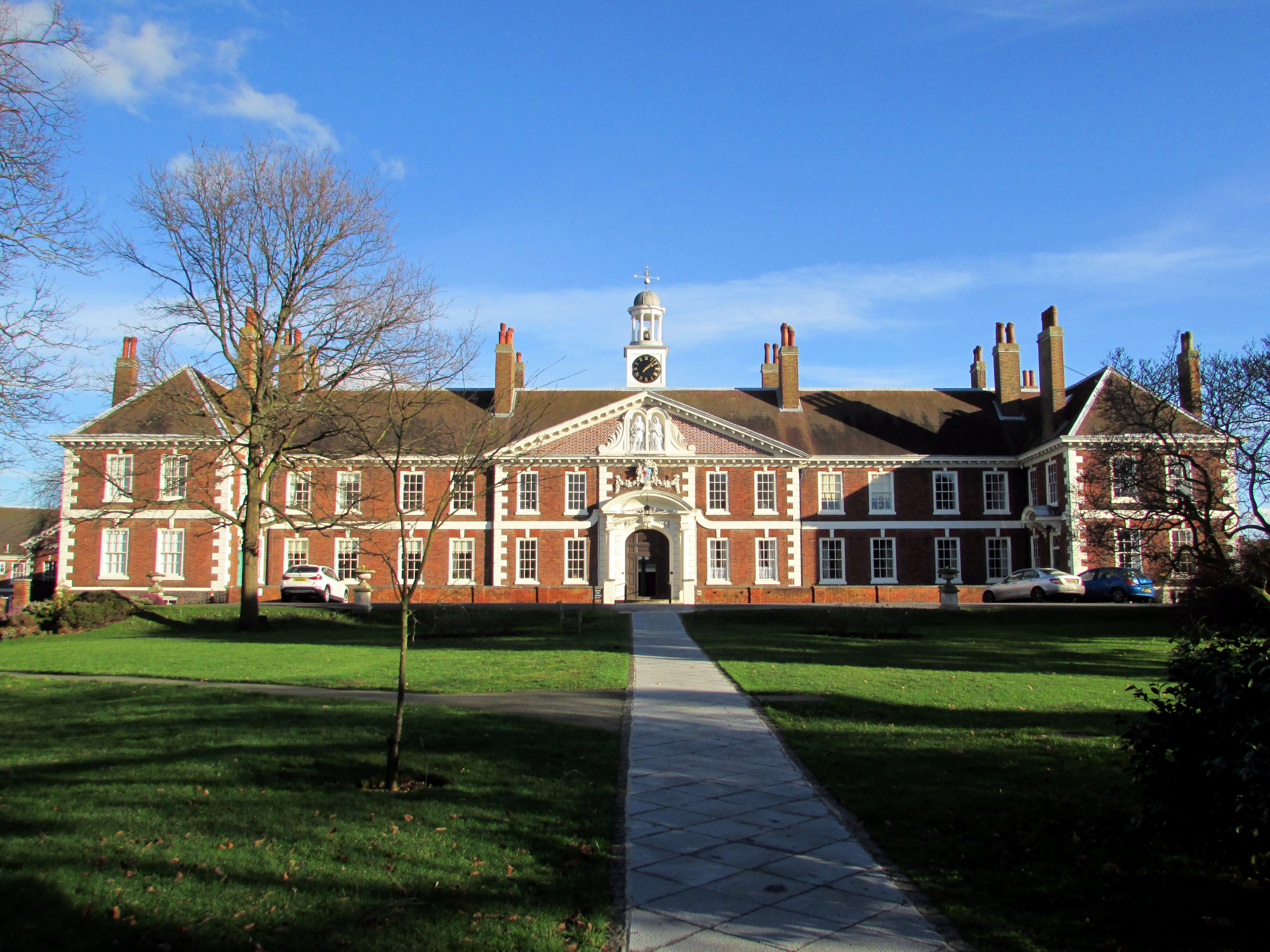

- Location within Greater London
- 51°28′10″N 0°01′10″E
- Type: Residential home
- Location: Blackheath, London, England

History
- Built: 1695-1702

Site notes
- Architect: Christopher Wren
- Governing body: Charity

Listed Building – Grade I
- Official name: Morden College
- Designated: 19 October 1951
- Reference no.: 1289879

Morden College is a charity which has been providing residential care in Blackheath, south-east London, England for over 300 years. Founded by philanthropist Sir John Morden in 1695 as a home for "poor Merchants", Morden College was built to a design sometimes attributed to Sir Christopher Wren. The original college buildings were intended to house 40 single or widowed men. Since expanded, today Morden College is a Grade I listed building and functions as a retirement home. In October 2023, its day centre, the John Morden Centre, won the Stirling Prize for architecture.

== History ==
The college was founded by the philanthropist Sir John Morden in 1695 as a home for 'poor Merchants... and such as have lost their Estates by accidents, dangers and perils of the seas or by any other accidents ways or means in their honest endeavours to get their living by means of Merchandizing.'

Morden College was built (to a design sometimes attributed to Sir Christopher Wren, but largely carried out by Edward Strong, his master mason) on the north-east corner of the Wricklemarsh estate.

The original college buildings were intended to house 40 single or widowed men. It was described by Daniel Lysons in Environs of London (1796):

It is a spacious brick structure, with stone coins and cornices, forming a quadrangle, which is surrounded by piazzas. Over the front are the statues of Sir John Morden and his lady. In the hall are their portraits, and that of Queen Anne. In the chapel are the arms of Sir John and Lady Morden, and a record of benefactions to the College since the founder's death.

=== Turkey Company period (1708–1826) ===
College trustees were drawn from the Turkey Company. Lysons reported:

Sir John Morden placed twelve decayed Turkey merchants in this College in his lifetime. He died in 1708, having by his will, bearing date 1702, endowed the College, after the death of his lady, with estates which are now about 1600l. per annum. Lady Morden, finding her income not sufficient to continue her husband's bounty to twelve merchants, was obliged, during her life, to reduce the number to four. She died in 1721, when the whole estate fell in to the College. The pensioners must be upwards of 50 years of age, bachelors or widowers, and members of the church of England; their pension is 40s. per month. There are commodious apartments for 30, which number, if any vacancies have happened, is filled up once a-year. The College is under the government of seven trustees of the Company of Turkey Merchants, who elect the pensioners.

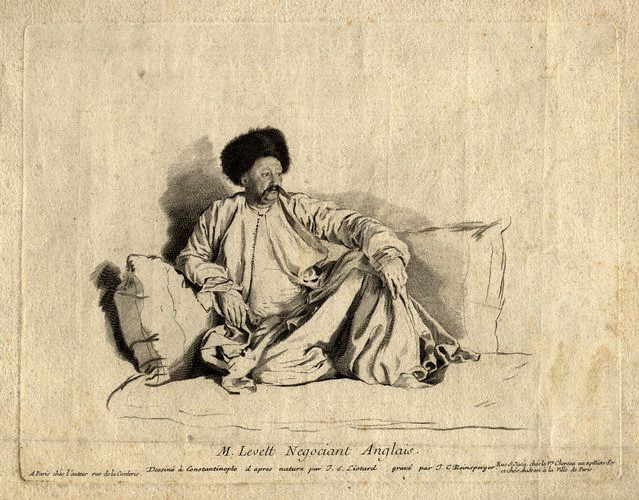
English Turkey merchant and Morden College benefactor Francis Levett, attired in Turkish costume, circa 1750

Subsequent donations to the college by prominent Turkey merchants and their wives helped assure that the college would survive. Lysons recorded those donors and the totals of their gifts:

| Year | Person | Value of gift |
|---|---|---|
| 1721 | Lady Morden | £100 |
| 1723 | Sir Charles Cooke | £100 |
| 1729 | Sir Peter Delmé | £100 |
| 1751 | William Hanger, Esq | £100 |
| 1751 | Richard Chiswell, Esq | £100 |
| 1752 | Thomas Cooke, Esq | £114 |
| 1764 | Francis Levett, Esq | £200 |
| 1772 | Richard Chiswell, Esq | £200 |
| 1774 | Richard Pyke, Esq | £1,000 |
| 1774 | John March, Esq | £500 |
| 1775 | Sir Gregory Page | £300 |
| 1788 | John Jamet, Esq | £50 |

=== East India Company period (1827–1884) ===
The first British East India Company Trustee was William Astell. He held the position from 1827 to 1847. John Lubbock was Chairman of the Trustees from 1873 to 1889.

=== Court of Aldermen of the City of London period (1884–present) ===
During the 20th century, admission requirements were amended so that the college could accommodate women and married couples, and several new buildings were added. Today, Morden College is a Grade I listed building (designated 19 October 1951), and functions as a retirement home. The college also manages other homes in Blackheath and in Beckenham.

In October 2023, the John Morden Centre, a day centre at Morden College designed by Mæ, won the Stirling Prize for architecture.

In November 2023, Galliard Homes, in a joint venture with Singaporean partner City Developments Limited, acquired the 13.8-acre Morden Wharf development in Greenwich from Morden College and its partner LandsecU+I.

== Other key people ==
=== Chaplains ===
- Moses Browne (1703–1787)

=== Notable residents ===
- Henry Newton Knights (1872–1959), former Conservative Member of Parliament, died here
- Ann Moss, FBA (1938–2018), scholar of French literature and classical reception, died here
