= Patrick Carey =

Patrick Carey may refer to:

- Patrick Cary (1624–1658), English poet
- Patrick Carey (cinematographer) (1916–1996)
