= Richard Du Cane =

British businessman and politician

Richard Du Cane (13 October 1681 – 3 October 1744) was a British businessman and politician who sat in the House of Commons from 1715 to 1722.

Du Cane was the son of Peter Du Cane, the elder and his wife Jane Booth, daughter of Richard Booth, a London merchant. The Du Cane family was of distinguished Huguenot descent and was a leading Essex family of merchants and politicians. He married Anne Lyde, daughter of Nehemiah Lyde of Coggeshall and his wife Priscilla Reade on 17 August 1710. By his marriage, he acquired a substantial property near Colchester.

Du Cane was a prominent businessman in the City of London, and served as a director of the Bank of England between 1710 and 1730. He was elected as a Whig Member of Parliament for Colchester (Essex) at the 1715 general election. In 1716, he voted for the septennial bill and for the repeal of the Occasional Conformity and Schism Acts. He voted against the Peerage Bill in 1719. He did not stand for parliament again. He was sometime Governor of Christ's Hospital and Guy's Hospital.

Du Cane's portrait is one of the well known paintings of Ignaz Stern.

Parliament of Great Britain
Preceded by William Gore; Nicholas Corsellis	Member of Parliament for Colchester; 1715 – 1722; With: Isaac Rebow	Succeeded by Matthew Martin; Sir Thomas Webster, Bt
