= Edward Bullock (English politician) =

English politician

Member of Parliament for Colchester
- In office May 1705 – December 1705 Serving with Sir Isaac Rebow
- Preceded by: Sir Thomas Cooke; Sir Isaac Rebow
- Succeeded by: Sir Thomas Webster, 1st Baronet; Sir Isaac Rebow

Personal details
- Born: 1663
- Died: 6 December 1705
- Spouse: Elizabeth Bullock (née Guyon)
- Children: 3
- Parents: Sir Edward Bullock (father); Elizabeth Bullock (née Bolton) (mother)
- Relatives: Bullock family
- Education: Newport School; St John's College, Cambridge; Gray's Inn

Edward Bullock (baptised 24 June 1663 – 6 December 1705) was a member of the Bullock family and MP for Essex from 1698 till 1700 and MP for Colchester from 8 May till his death on 6 December 1705.

== Family and education ==
Edward Bullock was the first son of Edward Bullock and Elizabeth (née Bolton). He was educated at Newport School, Essex, Trinity College, Cambridge in 1679 and Gray's Inn in 1682.

Edward Bullock acquired a lot of wealth through his marriages. He first married Elizabeth, daughter of Sir Mark Guyon of Coggeshall and Dynes Halland; they had one daughter, Elizabeth also. She died in childbirth in 1691 (as did her daughter in infancy). Sir Mark Guyon held the Manors of Dynes, Hosdens, Caxtons, Maplestead Hall, Brent Hall and Justices in Finchfield, Radwinter Hall, Great Wigborough, Salcot and Abbess' Hall. Thus by his marriage, Edward inherited significant Essex estates to became Lord of seven Manors.

After Elizabeth died, Edward married Mary,the daughter of Sir Josiah Child, 1st Baronet, the Governor of the East India Company on 11 February 1693. They had five sons and 2 daughters.

== Parliamentary career ==
Bullock considered standing for Parliament as early as 1694 but repeatedly hesitated. He finally stood with Sir Charles Barrington in 1698, with the support of Bishop Compton. In Parliament, he leaned towards Country and Tory positions. Rivalries between the Old and New East India companies and shifting alliances caused him to lose his Essex seat in 1701, and he failed again later that year.

By 1704 he had switched sides, aligning with the Whigs and helping back Whig candidates against his former Tory allies. He gained a seat for Colchester in 1705 and supported Whig positions, but died only months later. His estate passed through the family, and his son Josiah continued the family’s mercantile connections through marriage into another East India Company family.
