= Church of St Peter and St Paul, Tring =

Church in Hertfordshire, England

Church of St Peter and St Paul
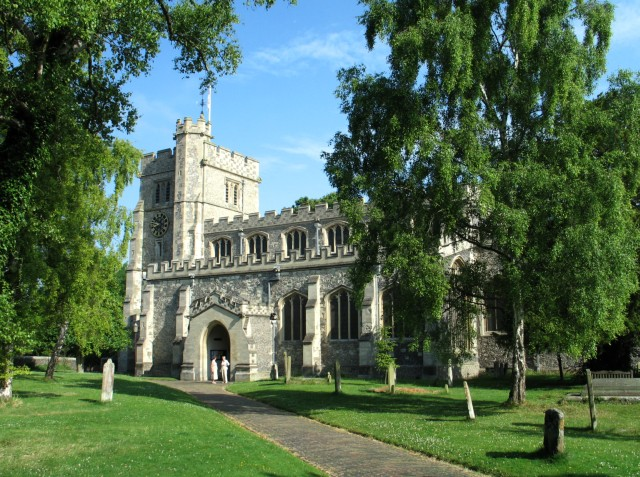
- Viewed from the south-east
- Church of St Peter and St Paul
- 51°47′40.2″N 0°39′39.9″W
- OS grid reference: SP 924 115
- Location: Tring, Hertfordshire
- Country: England
- Denomination: Church of England
- Website: www.tringteamparish.org.uk/tring-st-peter-st-pauls

Architecture
- Heritage designation: Grade I
- Designated: 21 September 1951

Administration
- Diocese: Diocese of St Albans

The Church of St Peter and St Paul is an Anglican church in Tring, Hertfordshire, England, and in the Diocese of St Albans. The building is Grade I listed. Although extensively restored in the late 19th century, it is largely a 15th-century building.

== History and description ==
It is thought there was a Norman church here by 1100, as a few stones in the outside chancel walls show Norman tooling. The church was rebuilt in the early 13th century. It is built of rough flint and blocks of Totternhoe stone, with some later replacement by Ancaster stone. In the 14th century wider aisles were built and a tower, which has a turret and a Hertfordshire spike, was added. The south porch is of the 14th century, restored in 1880; the moulded rear arch of the south door is of the 13th century.

In the 15th century the earlier arcades were replaced with arcades of six bays; the chancel arch and the clerestory were built at this time.

The chancel was partially rebuilt in the 16th century: three windows in the south wall date from this time, but the lancet window in the north wall of the chancel is of the 13th century.

=== Restoration ===
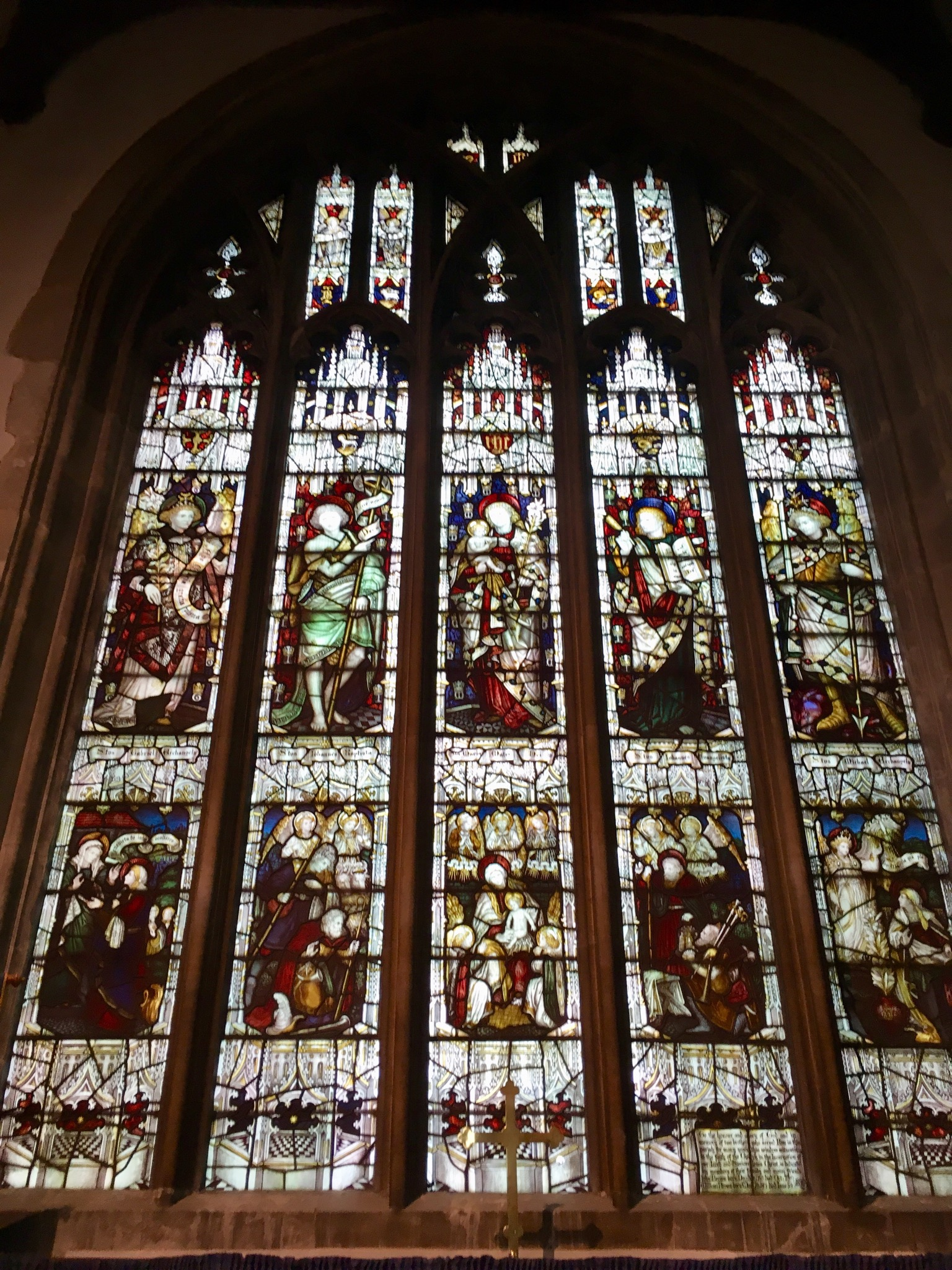
The stained glass window by Kempe at the east end of the south aisle

There was restoration between 1861 and 1882. The north aisle was rebuilt. The arcade columns of Totternhoe stone, found to be unsafe, were replaced with columns of Portland stone.

The pews were replaced with oak seating in 1862; the carved ends and seat fronts, and the oak pulpit, were made from designs of William Slater. The oak rood screen, made in 1899, was designed by G. F. Bodley, and the chancel roof was painted and gilded to his designs. The painting over the chancel arch was made in 1899 by Messrs Powell of London. The east window, inserted in 1851, and the west window, which has a 14th-century rear arch, both have stained glass by Clayton and Bell.

The font, given to the church in 1862, is made of coloured Streetly stone.

=== Monuments ===
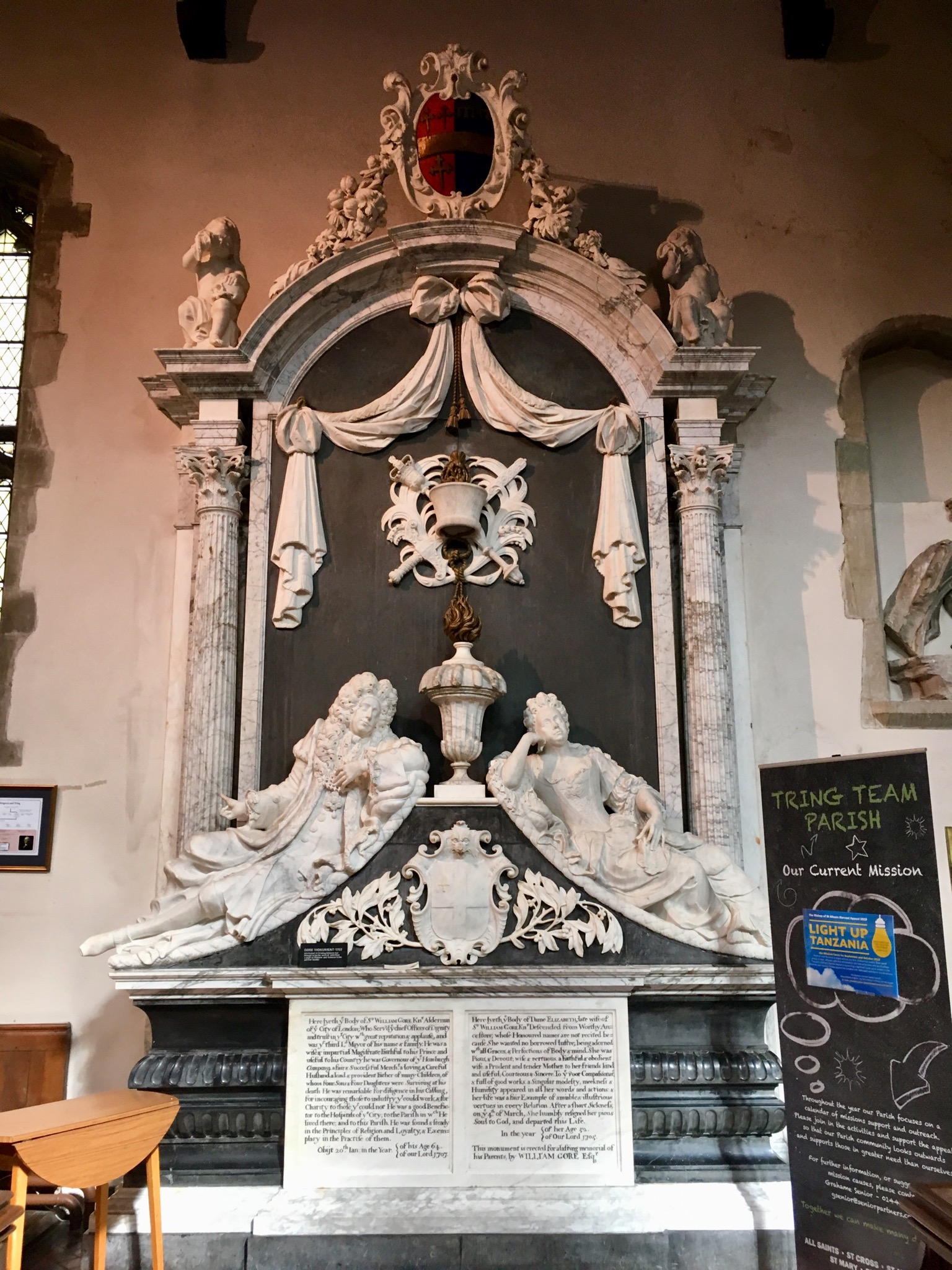
Memorial to Sir William Gore and his wife

In the north aisle, moved here from the chancel in 1882, is a marble monument to Sir William Gore (1644–1707) and his wife Elizabeth. It is thought to be by Grinling Gibbons or his pupil John Nost. It shows Gore, wearing the robes of Lord Mayor of London, and his wife reclining on either side of a funerary urn.

Nearby to the west, also moved from the chancel in 1882, is a marble monument to his son John Gore (c. 1689–1763).

=== Bells ===
There are eight bells: the treble and second were made in 1882 by Gillett and Bland, others are of the 17th and 18th century. The tenor bell, cast by Richard III Chandler in 1695, weighs 17 3/4cwt.

=== War memorial ===
The war memorial, situated in front of the church, was funded by public subscription, and was dedicated in November 1918. It is thought to be the first in the country erected in memory of those who lost their lives in the First World War.
