= Stamp Brooksbank =

MP and Governor of the Bank of England

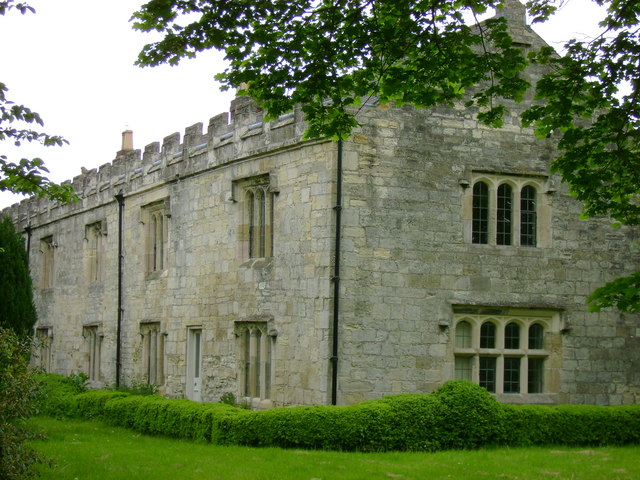
Healaugh Manor

Stamp Brooksbank (23 June 1694 – 24 May 1756) was an English MP and Governor of the Bank of England.

He was the eldest son of warehouseman and haberdasher Joseph Brooksbank of Hackney House and Cateaton St., Cheapside, London. He was the heir of his mother's father Richard Stamp, the elder brother of Sir Thomas Stamp, Lord Mayor of London in 1692. He became a successful merchant trading with Turkey and was a member of the New England Company in 1726. He succeeded his father in 1726 to Healaugh Manor, near Tadcaster, Yorkshire.

He was elected MP for Colchester in 1727 and for Saltash in 1743, being re-elected for the same constituency in 1747. He was a director of the Bank of England from 1728 to 1740 and from 1743 to 1755, as deputy governor from 1740 to 1741 and as governor from 1741 to 1743.

He built Hackney House in Clapton in 1732. He had married Elizabeth, the daughter of Joseph Thomson of Hackney and Nonsuch Park, Surrey with whom he had 3 sons and 5 daughters. He was succeeded by his son Joseph.

Parliament of Great Britain
Preceded by Sir Thomas Webster, Bt; Matthew Martin	Member of Parliament for Colchester; 1727 – 1734; With: Samuel Tufnell	Succeeded by Matthew Martin; Isaac Lemyng Rebow
Preceded by John Clevland; Thomas Corbett	Member of Parliament for Saltash; 1743 – July 1747; With: Thomas Corbett	Succeeded by Thomas Corbett; Edward Boscawen
Preceded by Edward Boscawen; Thomas Corbett	Member of Parliament for Saltash; December 1747 – 1754; With: Thomas Corbett to 1751; George Brydges Rodney 1751–54	Succeeded by George Clinton; Viscount Duncannon
Government offices
Preceded by Delillers Carbonnel	Governor of the Bank of England; 1741–1743	Succeeded by William Fawkener
