= John Gore (died 1763) =

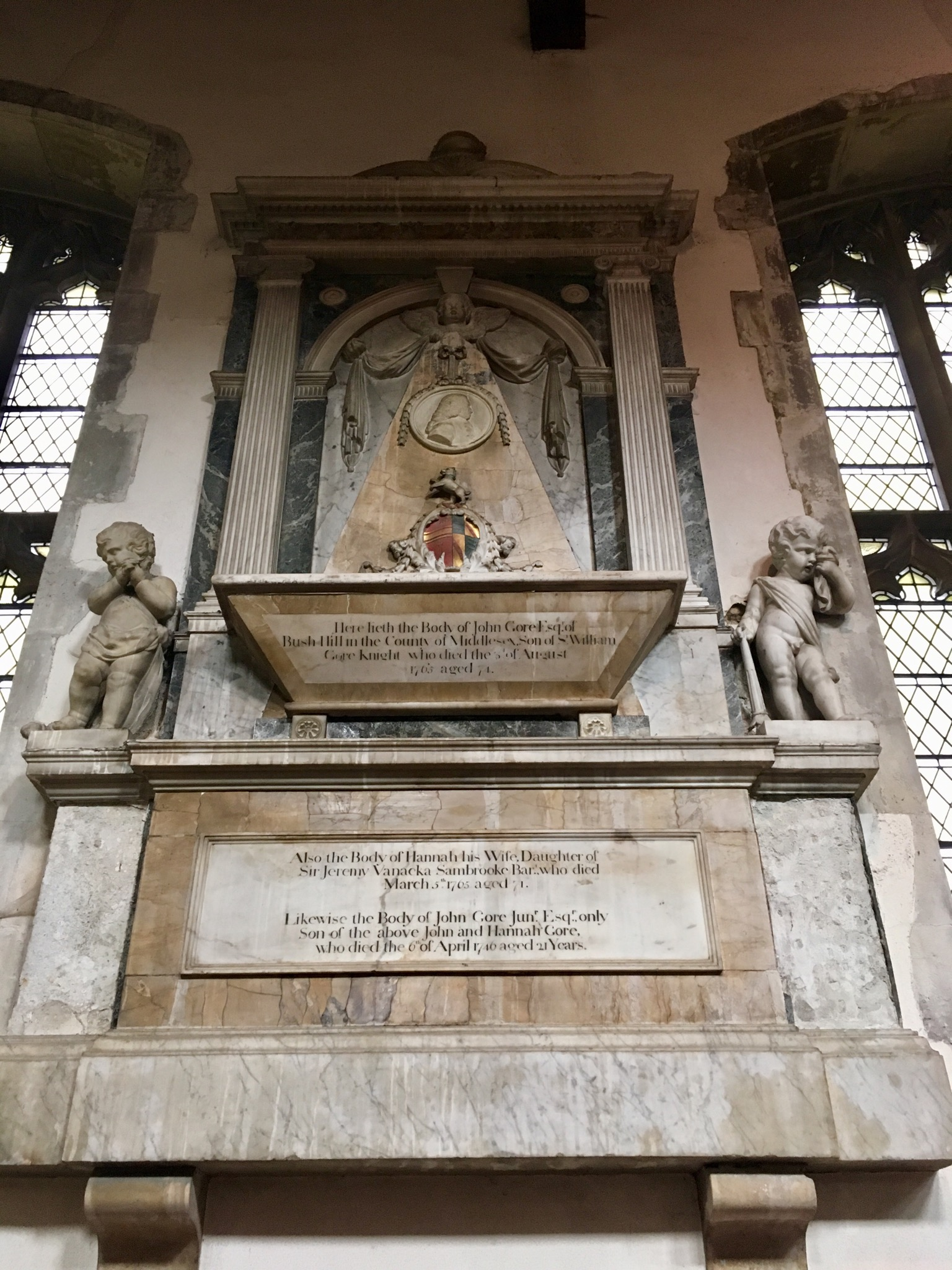
- Monument to John Gore in the Church of St Peter and St Paul, Tring
- In office 1747–1761
- Majority: Great Grimsby

Personal details
- Born: c.1689 England
- Died: 1763 (aged 73–74)
- Spouse: married
- Children: 2 daughters
- Parents: William Gore (Lord Mayor of London) (father); Elizabeth Hampton (mother)
- Relatives: Thomas Gore (brother, MP), William Gore (brother, MP)
- Occupation: merchant
- Known for: director of the South Sea Company from 1711 to 1712 and 1715 to 1721

John Gore (c. 1689–1763) of Bush Hill, Middlesex was a politician who sat in the House of Commons between 1747 and 1761.

== Family ==
Gore was born c.1689, the second son of William Gore (Lord Mayor of London) by Elizabeth Hampton, daughter of Walter Hampton. He was brother to Thomas Gore (died 1777) and William Gore who were also British MPs. Gore married and had issue. His daughter Catherine married her cousin, MP Joseph Mellish; his daughter Anne married Joseph's brother, William Mellish MP

== Career ==
Gore was a merchant and in a business partnership with Joseph Mellish who subsequently became his son-in-law. He was director of the South Sea Company from 1711 to 1712 and 1715 to 1721. He was elected Member of Parliament for Great Grimsby and served from 1747 to 1761.

Gore died on 3 August 1763.
