= William Gore (Lord Mayor of London) =

English merchant and Lord Mayor of London

Lord Mayor of London
- In office 1701–1702
- Preceded by: Sir Thomas Abney
- Succeeded by: Sir Samuel Dashwood

Personal details
- Born: 1644
- Died: 1707 (aged 62–63)
- Spouse: Elizabeth Hampton
- Children: At least 8, including William, Thomas and John
- Parents: William Gore (father); Jane Smith (mother)

Sir William Gore, depicted on his monument in the Church of St Peter and St Paul, Tring; sculpture attributed to John Nost.

Sir William Gore's arms

Sir William Gore (1644 - 1707) was Lord Mayor of London from 1701-02, having been elected Alderman for the City Ward of Coleman Street in 1690.

A successful merchant, Gore was appointed a founding Director of the Bank of England in 1694 before serving as Governor of the Hamburg and Levant Companies.

== Family ==
The son of William Gore, barrister-at-law, of Morden, Surrey and his wife Jane née Smith, Sir William was a grandson of Sir John Gore, Lord Mayor of London (died 1636), a kinsman of Arthur Gore, 1st Earl of Arran, and great-uncle of William Gore-Langton, MP.

He married Elizabeth Hampton, the daughter of a London merchant, at the Savoy Chapel, Westminster, in April 1674. They had at least eight children; three of their sons became Member of Parliament: William, Thomas and John Gore.

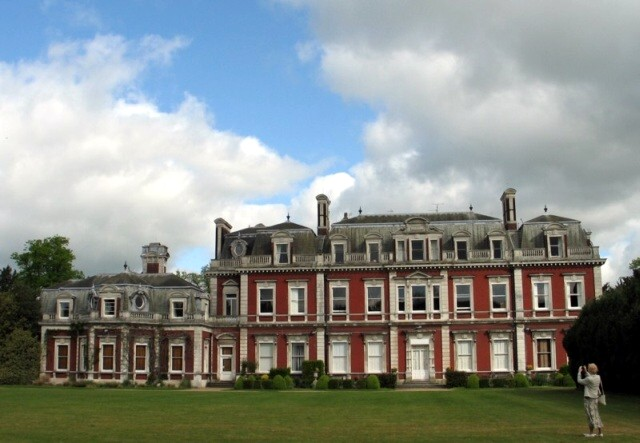
Tring Park Mansion (southern face)

In 1704, Sir William bought the lordship of the manor of Tring and moved into Tring Park Mansion, which had been designed by Sir Christopher Wren.

== Career ==
Gore established himself in mercery, the cloth trade, and was twice the master of The Mercers' Company. He became one of the major suppliers of hemp and canvas to the Royal Navy, and was also a prominent importer of linen from continental Europe and exported tobacco and sugar there, becoming a director at various times of the Hamburg Company, the Levant Company and the East India Company.

In 1690, Gore was elected to the Court of Aldermen and was knighted two years later. Despite being prosecuted in 1693 for supplying the Navy with "beds made of goats', horse and dogs' hair" instead of wool, he was elected to the Court of Directors of the new Bank of England and attended the first meeting on 27 July 1694. During the crisis for the new establishment in 1695, caused by the founding of the rival Land Bank, Gore was accused by the press of "shuffling tricks", although he appears to have acted with propriety throughout.

Gore also stood for election to the office of Sheriff of the City of London several times and was successful in 1698, and was elected Lord Mayor in 1701. In 1705, he negotiated a deal for the Bank of England to use Grocers' Hall as their headquarters, an arrangement that continued for almost forty years.

== Death ==
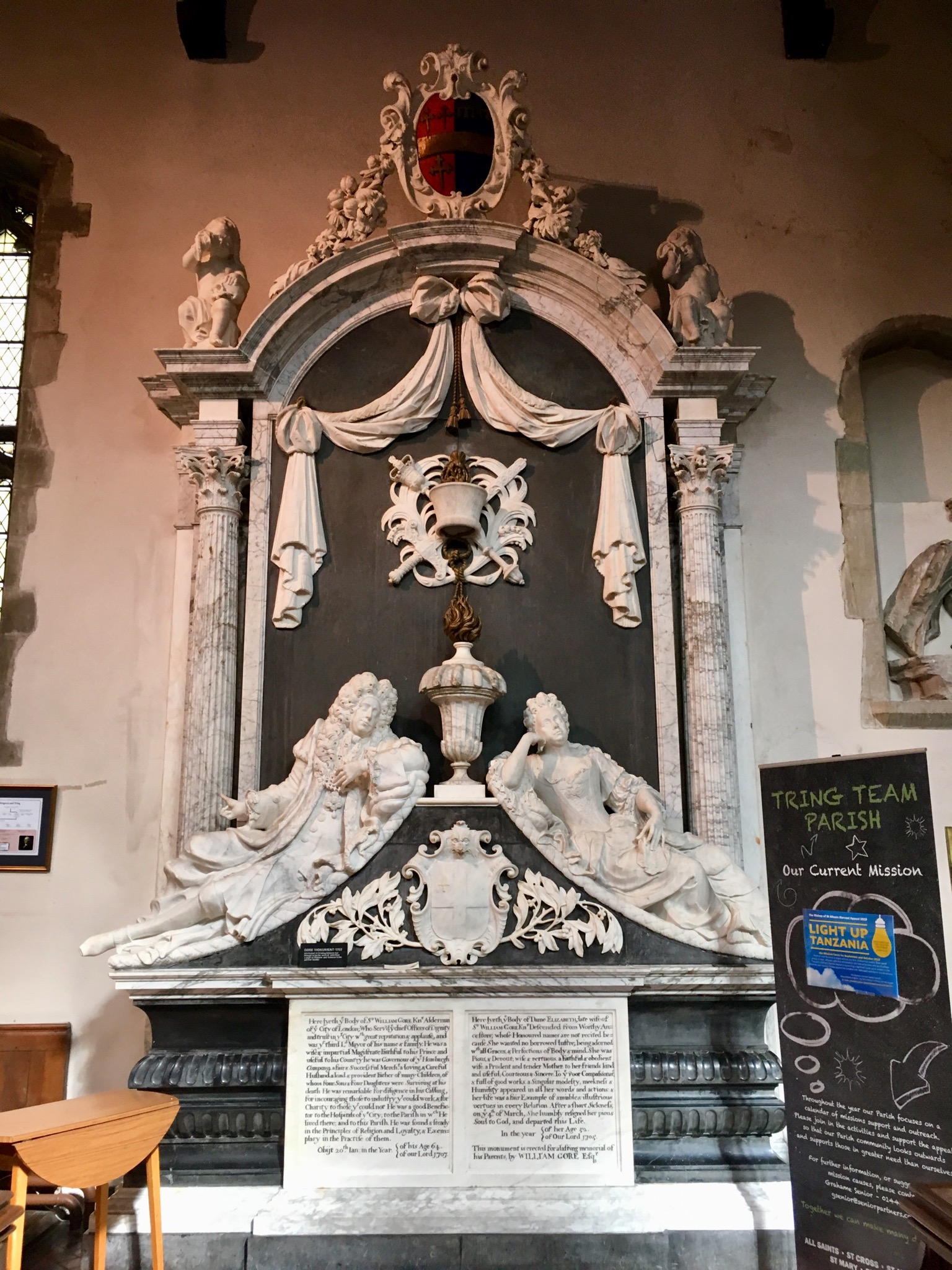
The Gore Monument in the Church of St Peter and St Paul, Tring

He died on 20 January 1707, his wife, Elizabeth, having predeceased him in 1705. He was given a grand funeral procession through the streets of London, including "as many old men as years of [his] age". On the following day, he was interred with his wife at the Church of St Peter and St Paul, Tring. His eldest son, William, had an elaborate monument to his parents made in the church, which depicts the life-size marble figures of Sir William in mayor's robes and his wife reclining on either side of an urn; the sculptor was either Grinling Gibbons or John Nost.

Civic offices
Preceded by Sir Thomas Abney	Lord Mayor of London; 1701–1702	Succeeded by Sir Samuel Dashwood
