= Nicholas Corsellis =

MP for Colchester

Member of Parliament for Colchester
- In office 6 May 1714 – 1715 Serving with William Gore
- Preceded by: Sir Thomas Webster, 1st Baronet; Sir Isaac Rebow
- Succeeded by: Richard Du Cane; Sir Isaac Rebow

Personal details
- Born: 21 September 1661
- Died: 25 January 1728 Chelsea, London
- Party: Tory
- Spouse: Elizabeth Corsellis (née Taylor)
- Children: 3
- Parents: Nicholas Corsellis (father); Martha Corsellis (née Thompson) (mother)
- Education: Eton College (1678); Lincoln College, Oxford (1679), L. Inn (1682)

Sir Nicholas Corsellis (21 September 1661 – 25 January 1728) was an English lawyer and Tory politician who served as MP for Colchester from 1714 till 1715.

Nicholas Corsellis was born on 21 September 1661, he was the only surviving son of Nicholas Corsellis and Martha Corsellis (née Thompson). On 12 May 1694, he married Elizabeth Taylor and they had 1 son and 2 daughters.

== Parliamentary career ==
Nicholas Corsellis first contested Colchester in 1713 and was initially reject but he and William Gore successfully petitioned the seat. He lost his seat after the 1715 election and unsuccessfully petitioned to overturn the result. In later years, he came under financial strain and mortgaged his estates in 1726.
