= Samuel Reynolds (MP) =

MP for Colchester

Member of Parliament for Colchester
- In office March 1681 – March 1681 Serving with Sir Harbottle Grimston
- Preceded by: Sir Walter Clarges, 1st Baronet; Sir Harbottle Grimston
- Succeeded by: Sir Walter Clarges, 1st Baronet; Nathaniel Lawrence
- In office March 1689 – 23 August 1694
- Preceded by: Sir Walter Clarges; Nathaniel Lawrence
- Succeeded by: Sir Thomas Cooke; Sir Isaac Rebow

Personal details
- Born: circa. 1642
- Died: 23 August 1694
- Spouse: Judith Reynolds (nee Samford)
- Children: 6
- Parents: Thomas Reynolds (father); Margery Reynolds (nee Decoster) (mother)

Samuel Reynolds (circa. 1642 – 23 August 1694) was an English politician who served as MP for Colchester for a brief period in March 1681 and from 1689 till his death on 23 August 1694.
