= Fulham School =

Fulham Prep

Location
- 200 Greyhound Road; Fulham, London, Greater London, W14 9SD; England; 51.4865°N 0.2097°W

Information
- Type: Private senior, preparatory, pre-preparatory, and nursery day school
- Established: 1996
- Local authority: Hammersmith and Fulham
- Parent organistation: Inspired Education Group
- Department for Education URN: 131165 Tables
- Ofsted: Reports
- Chair: Mark Snell
- Head of school: Majid Sarha
- Head of Prep School: Ellis David Troy Swann
- Head of Nursery & Pre-Prep School: Thomas Lewis
- Gender: Co-educational
- Age: 3 to 13
- Enrollment: 724 (2020)
- Website: fulham.school

Fulham School, originally founded as Fulham Preparatory School, is a school in Fulham, London, teaching children from the age of three up to eighteen. From its beginnings as a pre-prep and preparatory school, in 2017, it moved into also providing secondary education.

The Prep school's buildings in Greyhound Road, Hammersmith, were previously used by Holborn College, and from 1981 until 1985, were the film location for the children's television programme Grange Hill.

The school had a new senior school campus at Chesilton Road, Fulham, completed in March 2021, which accommodates 220 students from Year Nine onwards in a new purpose-built building. September 2021 saw the launch of a Sixth Form, following accreditation process for the International Baccalaureate, to be able to offer Sixth Form students the IB Diploma Programme. In November 2024, the closure of the Senior School had been announced for the end of the 2025 academic year.

The school also has a nursery and pre-prep campus located on Fulham High Street.

== The closure of Fulham Senior School ==
On the 6th of November 2024, an unexpected letter was sent to parents of the school. This letter outlined the sudden closing of the school, in which they state that is due to the opening of Inspired Education and Alpha Plus Schools opening The Wetherby - Pembridge School in Kensington Olympia, stating in the letter to parents that 'As a result, it is natural now that Wetherby Pembridge should become a senior pathway of choice for Fulham School families, and indeed feedback from families has been very positive to this effect. From September 2025, Fulham School will therefore return to its core DNA as an exceptional Pre-Prep and Prep School at the Fulham High Street and Greyhound Road sites. To that end, we are announcing the phased closure of Fulham Senior School."

The closure announcement prompted a variety of responses from parents and students. Some expressed concern about the impact on pupils, particularly those in Year 11 and Year 13, as the closure was announced shortly after the application season for alternative sixth-form options had ended, creating logistical challenges for students planning their post-school education.

Feedback on the school’s academic standards prior to closure indicated some dissatisfaction with aspects of teaching quality and staffing consistency. Reports from former students suggested frequent changes in teaching staff over the two-year GCSE courses. Several students described having to largely self-study to prepare for exams. The 2025 GCSE exam results placed Fulham School among the lower quartile of independent schools nationally. This performance contributed to concerns about the school’s ability to support students adequately during its final years.

In addition to academic concerns, some parents and alumni raised issues relating to the transition process and the notice provided to families. Reports were also made about billing disputes and delays in refunding deposits following the closure. This is why the school announced that Year 10 and 12 students were permitted to stay an extra year in order to finish their GCSEs and A-Levels, however by January 2025, there were zero students in each year. Additionally, Wetherby Pembridge was only accepting Year 7 and 8 students in its first year, meaning nobody from the senior school could actually join immediately.

Following the school’s closure, it appears that official records of Fulham Senior School have been removed or are no longer publicly accessible. The school’s registration details are missing from Companies House, and much information about the school has been removed or hidden from online sources. This removal is consistent with practices sometimes employed during institutional closures or reorganisations.
