= William Ockenden =

English Member of Parliament

William Ockenden (died 1761), of Temple Mills, Bisham, Berkshire and Weybridge, Surrey, was an English Member of Parliament (MP).

He was a Member of the Parliament of England for Great Marlow 1744 to 1754.
