= William Nottingham =

English politician

Member of Parliament for Colchester
- In office December 1421 – December 1421 Serving with Thomas Godstone
- Preceded by: John Kimberley
- Succeeded by: John Vertue
- Preceded by: William Nottingham
- Succeeded by: John Makin

Personal details
- Died: 1432/3
- Spouse: Joan
- Children: 2

William Nottingham (died 1432/3) was an English politician who sat as MP for Colchester in December 1421 and 1426. He had previously worked in the textile trade prior to politics.

He married Joan sometime before November 1400 and had a son, William, and daughter, Joan.

He served as councillor in Colchester from September 1404 until 1407, and as alderman in 1411–12, 1413–14, 1418–19, 1425–6, 1429–30, and 1432-3.
