= William Cardinall =

William Cardinall may refer to one of two men:

- William Cardinall (MP for Colchester) (1509/10 – 7 or 8 August 1568), a sixteenth-century English politician
- William Cardinall (MP for Dartmouth) (c. 1535 – c. 1598), his son
