= Thomas Lucas =

Thomas Lucas may refer to:

- Thomas Lucas (MP for Grampound) (c. 1720–1784), British member of parliament (MP) and West India merchant
- Thomas Lucas (MP for Midhurst), MP for Midhurst in 1407
- Thomas Lucas (MP for Southwark), MP for Southwark in 1421
- Thomas Lucas (MP for Colchester), MP for Colchester
- Thomas Lucas (Royalist) (died 1649), officer fighting for the royalist cause in the English Civil War
- Thomas Lucas (educator) (c. 1764–1838), founder of the Royal London Society for Blind People and developer of the Lucas tactile alphabet system
- Thomas Lucas (1822–1902), first baronet of the Lucas baronets
- Thomas Pennington Lucas (1843–1917), Scottish-born Australian medical practitioner, naturalist, author, philosopher and utopianist
- Thomas Geoffry Lucas (1872–1947), English architect
- Thomas John Lucas (1826–1908), Union general in the American Civil War
- Tommy Lucas (1895–1953), England footballer
- Tom Lucas (trade unionist) (1876–after 1936), Welsh trade union leader
- Thomas Lucas (cricketer) (1852–1945), Australian cricketer
- Thomas Lucas (water polo) (born 1989), Dutch water polo player on the Netherlands men's national water polo team
