= Colchester (constituency) =

UK Parliament constituency (1295–1983, 1997 onwards)

- Borough constituency for the House of Commons
- Interactive map of boundaries since 2024
- Location within the East of England
- County: Essex
- Electorate: 76,843 (March 2020)
- Major settlements: Colchester, The Hythe, Myland

Current constituency
- Created: 1997
- Member of Parliament: Pam Cox (Labour)
- Seats: One
- Created from: Colchester North, South Colchester and Maldon

1918–1983
- Seats: One
- Type of constituency: County constituency
- Created from: Colchester (Parliamentary Borough), Harwich (part)
- Replaced by: Colchester North and Colchester South & Maldon

1295–1918
- Seats: Two to 1885, one from 1885 to 1918
- Type of constituency: Borough constituency
- Replaced by: Colchester (county constituency)

Colchester is a constituency (Note: A borough constituency (for the purposes of election expenses and type of returning officer)) in Essex represented in the House of Commons of the UK Parliament since 2024 by Pam Cox of the Labour Party. (Note: As with all constituencies, the constituency elects one Member of Parliament (MP) by the first past the post system of election at least every five years.)

The seat was previously held by Conservative MP Will Quince, who announced in June 2023 that he would not be standing for re-election.

== Constituency profile ==
The Colchester constituency is located in Essex and contains most of the city of Colchester. The city is historic and was known as Camulodunum in Roman times, during which it served as the capital of Roman Britain and was an important military centre. The city continues to be associated with the military today as the site of Colchester Garrison, home of the Parachute Regiment. Wealth in the city is divided; the eastern suburb of Greenstead has high levels of deprivation whilst northern and western suburbs like Lexden and Myland are affluent.

Compared to the rest of the country, residents of Colchester are generally younger and have average levels of wealth and education. White people make up 84% of the population, similar to the nationwide figure, with Asians being the largest ethnic minority group at 7%. At the local council level, the southern half of the city is represented by Labour Party councillors whilst the northern suburbs elected Liberal Democrats. An estimated 52% of voters in Colchester favoured leaving the European Union in the 2016 referendum, identical to the nationwide figure.

== History ==
The Parliamentary Borough of Colchester had sent two members to the Parliament of England since the Model Parliament of 1295 until 1707, then to the Parliament of Great Britain from 1707 to 1800 and to the Parliament of the United Kingdom from 1801. In 1885, it was one of 36 English boroughs and three Irish boroughs to have its representation reduced to one under the Redistribution of Seats Act 1885. Under the Representation of the People Act 1918, the Parliamentary Borough was abolished and replaced with a Division of the County of Essex (later a County Constituency).

The revised constituency remained virtually unchanged until it was briefly abolished for the 1983 general election following the Third Periodic Review of Westminster Constituencies, but re-established for the 1997 general election as a Borough Constituency by the Fourth Review.

In 1997, the vote was split three ways with the Liberal Democrat candidate Bob Russell winning with a small majority. Russell increased his votes and percentage share in next three elections. In the 2010 election this was the only non-Conservative seat in Essex. Russell was defeated in the 2015 general election by Conservative Will Quince, by an 11.5% majority. In the 2017 election Quince was re-elected by a slightly decreased margin by percentage (10.6%), with Labour moving into 2nd place after a substantial increase in their vote. In the 2019 election, Quince increased his majority to 9,423 or 17.6% in percentage terms. The seat lost the ward of Old Heath and The Hythe in the 2023 Boundary Commission review which increased the nominal Conservative majority to over 10,000, but despite this, Colchester was won by Labour for the first time since 1945 in the 2024 general election with Pam Cox as the new MP. The Liberal Democrats came fourth, narrowly behind Reform UK.

== Boundaries and boundary changes ==
=== Historic ===
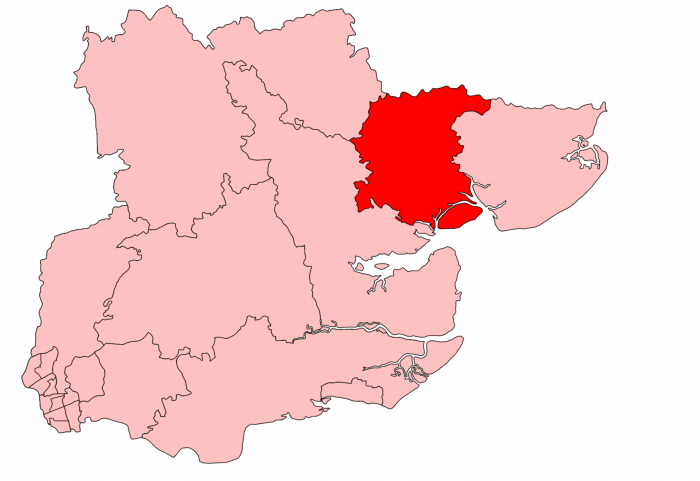
Colchester in Essex 1918–1983

==== 1918–1950 ====
- The Borough of Colchester; and
- The Rural District of Lexden and Winstree except the detached part of the parish of Inworth which was wholly surrounded by the parishes of Great Braxted and Kelvedon.

The area comprising the Rural District of Lexden and Winstree had largely been part of the Harwich Division.

==== 1950–1983 ====
- The Borough of Colchester;
- The Urban District of West Mersea; and
- The Rural District of Lexden and Winstree.

No changes (the Urban District of West Mersea had been formed as a separate local authority in 1926).

For the 1983 general election, the constituency was abolished, with the northern parts (comprising the majority) forming the bulk of the new constituency of North Colchester. Southern areas were included in the new constituency of South Colchester and Maldon.

==== 1997–2010 ====
Map of boundaries 2010–2024

- The Borough of Colchester wards of Berechurch, Castle, Harbour, Lexden, Mile End, New Town, Prettygate, St Andrew's, St Anne's, St John's, St Mary's, Shrub End, and Stanway.

Re-established as a Borough Constituency from parts of the abolished constituencies of South Colchester and Maldon (Berechurch, Harbour, New Town, Prettygate and Shrub End wards) and North Colchester (remaining wards).

==== 2010–2024 ====
- The Borough of Colchester wards of Berechurch, Castle, Christ Church, Harbour, Highwoods, Lexden, Mile End, New Town, Prettygate, St Andrew's, St Anne's, St John's, and Shrub End.

Local authority wards redistributed. Minor reduction in electorate, with Stanway ward being included in the new constituency of Witham.

=== Current ===
Further to the 2023 review of Westminster constituencies, which came into effect for the 2024 general election, the composition of the constituency is as follows (as they existed on 1 December 2020):

- The City of Colchester wards of: Castle; Greenstead; Highwoods; Lexden & Braiswick (polling districts AQ, AS and AT); Mile End; New Town & Christ Church; Prettygate; St. Anne’s & St. John’s; Shrub End.

The revised contents closely correspond to the previous boundaries, with the exception of the Old Heath and The Hythe areas to the south east of the city centre, which are now included in Harwich and North Essex.

== Members of Parliament ==
=== MPs 1295–1640 ===
Parliament	First member	Second member
1312	Joseph Elianore	
1386	Thomas Francis	Ralph Algar
1388 (February)	Thomas Francis	Simon Fordham
1388 (September)	Ralph Algar	Simon Fordham
1390 (January)	Thomas Francis	Simon Fordham
1390 (November)		
1391	Thomas Francis	John Christian
1393	William Mate	John Christian
1394		
1395	Thomas Francis	John Christian
1397 (January)	Henry Boss	John Seaburgh
1397 (September)		
1399	Thomas Francis	Thomas Godstone
1401		
1402	Henry Boss	Thomas Godstone
1404 (January)		
1404 (October)		
1406	Henry Boss	William Mate
1407	Thomas Godstone	William Mate
1410		
1411	Thomas Godstone	John Pod
1413 (February)		
1413 (May)	Thomas Godstone	Thomas Francis
1414 (April)		
1414 (November)	Thomas Godstone	Simon Mate
1415		
1416 (March)	John Ford	John Sumpter
1416 (October)		
1417	Thomas Godstone	John Ford
1419	Thomas Godstone	John Sumpter
1420	Thomas Godstone	John Kimberley
1421 (May)	Thomas Godstone	John Kimberley
1421 (December)	Thomas Godstone	William Nottingham
1426		William Nottingham
1427	Thomas Godstone	
1485	Thomas Christmas	John Vertue
1510	No names known	
1512	?John Clere	?John Makin
1515	?John Clere	?John Makin
1523	Thomas Audley	Ambrose Lowth
1529	Sir John Raynsford	Richard Rich
1536	?	
1539	?	
1542	?	
1545	John Lucas	Benjamin Clere
1547	John Ryther	John Lucas
1553 (March)	Sir Francis Jobson	?John Lucas
1553 (October)	John Lucas	John Best
1554 (April)	Sir Francis Jobson	William Cardinall
1554 (November)	George Sayer	Robert Browne
1555	Sir Francis Jobson	John Hering
1558	George Christmas	Thomas Lucas
1559	Sir Francis Jobson	William Cardinall
1562-63	Sir Francis Jobson	William Cardinall
1571	Henry Golding	Francis Harvey
1572	Robert Christmas	Henry Golding, died and replaced in 1576 by Nicholas Clere, who also died and was replaced in 1579 by Robert Middleton
1584	James Morice	Francis Harvey
1586	James Morice	Francis Harvey
1588	James Morice	Arthur Throckmorton
1593	James Morice	Martin Bessell
1597	Richard Symnell	Robert Barker
1601	Robert Barker	Richard Symnell
1604–1611	Robert Barker	Edward Alford
1614	Robert Barker	Edward Alford
1621–1622	Edward Alford	William Towse
1624	Edward Alford	William Towse
1625	Sir Robert Quarles	William Towse
1626	Edward Alford	William Towse
1628	Sir Thomas Cheek	Edward Alford repl. on petition by Sir William Masham, 1st Baronet
1639–1640	No Parliaments summoned	

=== MPs 1640–1885 ===
Year	First member	First party	Second member	Second party
April 1640	Sir Harbottle Grimston (Note: Succeeded to a baronetcy, April 1648)	Parliamentarian	Sir William Masham, 1st Baronet	
November 1640	Sir Harbottle Grimston	Parliamentarian	Sir Thomas Barrington	Parliamentarian
September 1644	Sir Harbottle Grimston	Parliamentarian	Barrington died September 1644 - seat vacant	
1645	Sir Harbottle Grimston	Parliamentarian	John Sayer	
December 1648	Grimston excluded in Pride's Purge - seat vacant		Sayer not recorded as sitting after Pride's Purge	
1653	Colchester was unrepresented in the Barebones Parliament			
1654	Colonel John Barkstead		John Maidstone	
1656	Henry Lawrence		John Maidstone	
January 1659	Abraham Johnson		John Shaw	
May 1659	Not represented in the restored Rump			
April 1660	Sir Harbottle Grimston	Whig	John Shaw	
1679	Sir Harbottle Grimston	Whig	Sir Walter Clarges, Bt	Tory
1681	Sir Harbottle Grimston	Whig	Samuel Reynolds	Whig
1685	Sir Walter Clarges	Tory	Nathaniel Lawrence	Whig
1689	Samuel Reynolds	Whig	Sir Isaac Rebow	Whig
1690	Samuel Reynolds	Whig	Edward Cary	Tory
1692	Samuel Reynolds	Whig	Sir Isaac Rebow	Whig
1694	Sir Thomas Cooke	Tory	Sir Isaac Rebow	Whig
1695	Sir John Morden, Bt	Whigs	Sir Isaac Rebow	Whig
1698	Sir Thomas Cooke	Tory	Sir Isaac Rebow	Whig
May 1705	Edward Bullock		Sir Isaac Rebow	Whig
December 1705	Sir Thomas Webster, Bt (Note: Webster and Rebow were re-elected in 1714, but on petition the result was reversed and Gore declared to have been duly elected instead, following a dispute over whether foreigners could be made freemen of the borough and thereby acquire voting rights)	Whigs	Sir Isaac Rebow	Whig
1711	William Gore	Tories	Sir Isaac Rebow	Whig
1713	Sir Thomas Webster, Bt	Whigs	Sir Isaac Rebow	Whig
1714 (Note: Webster was re-elected in 1710, but on petition the result was reversed and Gore and Corsellis declared to have been duly elected instead, following a further dispute over foreign freemen's voting rights)	William Gore	Tory	Nicholas Corsellis	Tory
1715	Richard Du Cane	Whig	Sir Isaac Rebow	Whig
1722	Sir Thomas Webster	Whig	Matthew Martin	Whig
1727	Stamp Brooksbank	Whig	Samuel Tufnell	Whig
1734	Isaac Lemyng Rebow	Whig	Matthew Martin	Whig
1735	Jacob Houblon	Tory	Matthew Martin	Whig
1741	John Olmius	Whig	Matthew Martin	Whig
1742 (Note: At the election of 1741, Olmius and Martin were returned as elected, but on petition their election was declared void and their opponents, Savill and Gray, declared elected in their place)	Samuel Savill	Whig	Charles Gray (Note: At the election of 1754, Gray was re- elected, but on petition his election was declared void and his opponent, Rebow, declared elected in his place)	Tory
1747	Richard Savage Nassau	Whig	Charles Gray	Tory
1754	John Olmius	Whig	Charles Gray	Tory
1755	John Olmius	Whig	Isaac Martin Rebow	Whig
1761	Charles Gray	Tory	Isaac Martin Rebow	Whig
1780	Sir Robert Smyth, Bt	Radical Whig	Isaac Martin Rebow	Whig
1781	Sir Robert Smyth, Bt	Radical Whig	Christopher Potter (Note: On petition, Potter's election was declared void on the grounds of defective qualification and his opponent, Affleck, declared duly elected)	Tory
1782	Sir Robert Smyth, Bt	Radical Whig	Sir Edmund Affleck, Bt (Note: Admiral from 1784)	Tory
April 1784	Christopher Potter (Note: On petition, Potter was declared ineligible on the grounds of bankruptcy, and a writ for a new election was issued)	Tory	Sir Edmund Affleck, Bt	Tory
July 1784	Sir Robert Smyth, Bt	Radical	Sir Edmund Affleck, Bt	Tory
1788	Sir Robert Smyth, Bt	Radical	George Tierney	Radical
1790	Robert Thornton	Tory	George Jackson	Tory
1796	Robert Thornton	Tory	The Lord Muncaster	Tory
1802	Robert Thornton	Tory	John Denison	Tory
1806	Robert Thornton	Tory	William Tufnell	Whig
1807	Robert Thornton	Tory	Richard Hart Davis	Tory
1812	Robert Thornton	Tory	Hart Davis	Tory
1817	Sir William Burroughs, Bt	Tory	Hart Davis	Tory
February 1818	Sir William Burroughs, Bt	Tory	James Beckford Wildman	Tory
June 1818	Daniel Whittle Harvey (Note: Harvey was re-elected in 1820 but on petition his election was declared void on the grounds of defective qualification and a by-election was held)	Radical	James Beckford Wildman	Tory
1820	Henry Baring	Tory	James Beckford Wildman	Tory
1826	Daniel Whittle Harvey	Radical	Sir George Smyth, Bt	Tory
1829	Daniel Whittle Harvey	Radical	Richard Sanderson	Tory
1830	Daniel Whittle Harvey	Radical	Andrew Spottiswoode (Note: On petition, Spottiswoode's election was declared void and a by-election was held)	Tory
1831	Daniel Whittle Harvey	Radical	William Mayhew	Whig
1832	Daniel Whittle Harvey	Radical	Richard Sanderson	Tory
1834	Daniel Whittle Harvey	Radical	Richard Sanderson	Conservative
1835	Sir George Smyth, Bt	Conservative	Richard Sanderson	Conservative
1847	Sir George Smyth, Bt	Conservative	Joseph Hardcastle	Whig
1850	Lord John Manners	Conservative	Joseph Hardcastle	Whig
1852	Lord John Manners	Conservative	William Warwick Hawkins	Conservative
February 1857	John Gurdon Rebow	Radical	William Warwick Hawkins	Conservative
March 1857	John Gurdon Rebow	Radical	Taverner John Miller	Conservative
1859	Philip Oxenden Papillon	Conservative	Taverner John Miller	Conservative
1865	John Gurdon Rebow	Liberal	Taverner John Miller	Conservative
1867	John Gurdon Rebow	Liberal	Edward Karslake	Conservative
1868	John Gurdon Rebow	Liberal	William Brewer	Liberal
1870	Alexander Learmonth	Conservative	William Brewer	Liberal
1874	Alexander Learmonth	Conservative	Herbert Mackworth-Praed	Conservative
1880	Richard Causton	Liberal	William Willis	Liberal
1885	Representation reduced to one member			

=== MPs 1885–1983 ===
Election	Member	Party
1885	Henry John Trotter	Conservative
1888 by-election	Lord Brooke	Conservative
1892	Herbert Naylor-Leyland	Conservative
1895 by-election	Weetman Pearson	Liberal
1910	Laming Worthington-Evans	Conservative
1929	Oswald Lewis	Conservative
1945	George Smith	Labour
1950	Cuthbert Alport	Conservative
1961 by-election	Antony Buck	Conservative
1983	Constituency abolished	

=== MPs since 1997 ===
Colchester North and South Colchester & Maldon prior to 1997

Election	Member	Party
1997	Bob Russell	Liberal Democrat
2015	Will Quince	Conservative
2024	Pam Cox	Labour

== Elections ==
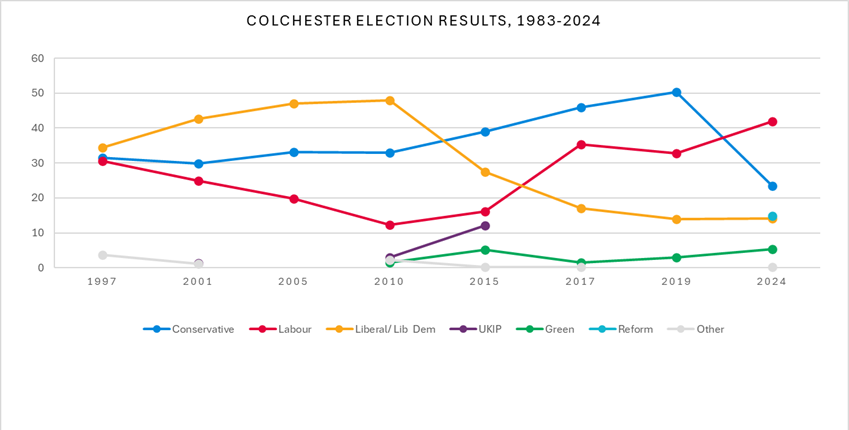
Colchester election results 1983-2024

=== Elections in the 2020s ===
General election 2024: Colchester
Party	Candidate	Votes	%	±%
Labour	Pam Cox	18,804	41.9	+11.8
Conservative	James Cracknell	10,554	23.5	−28.8
Reform	Terence Longstaff	6,664	14.8	N/A
Liberal Democrats	Martin Goss	6,393	14.2	−0.5
Green	Sara Ruth	2,414	5.4	+2.5
Climate	James Rolfe	74	0.2	N/A
Majority		8,250	18.4	N/A
Turnout		44,903	57.0	–6.8
Registered electors		78,662		
Labour gain from Conservative		Swing	+20.3	

=== Elections in the 2010s ===
2019 general election notional result
Party	Vote	%
Conservative	25,693	52.3
Labour	14,753	30.1
Liberal Democrats	7,209	14.7
Green	1,436	2.9
Turnout	49,091	63.9
Electorate	76,843	

General election 2019: Colchester
Party	Candidate	Votes	%	±%
Conservative	Will Quince	26,917	50.4	+4.5
Labour	Tina McKay	17,494	32.8	−2.5
Liberal Democrats	Martin Goss	7,432	13.9	−3.1
Green	Mark Goacher	1,530	2.9	+1.4
Majority		9,423	17.6	+7.0
Turnout		53,373	64.6	−2.3
Conservative hold		Swing	+3.5	

General election 2017: Colchester
Party	Candidate	Votes	%	±%
Conservative	Will Quince	24,565	45.9	+7.0
Labour	Tim Young	18,888	35.3	+19.1
Liberal Democrats	Bob Russell	9,087	17.0	−10.5
Green	Mark Goacher	828	1.5	−3.6
CPA	Robin Rennie	177	0.3	+0.1
Majority		5,677	10.6	−0.8
Turnout		53,545	66.9	+1.4
Conservative hold		Swing	6.1	

General election 2015: Colchester
Party	Candidate	Votes	%	±%
Conservative	Will Quince	18,919	38.9	+6.0
Liberal Democrats	Bob Russell	13,344	27.5	−20.5
Labour	Jordan Newell	7,852	16.2	+3.9
UKIP	John Pitts	5,870	12.1	+9.2
Green	Mark Goacher	2,499	5.1	+3.6
CPA	Ken Scrimshaw	109	0.2	New
Majority		5,575	11.4	N/A
Turnout		48,593	65.5	+3.2
Conservative gain from Liberal Democrats		Swing	+7.2	

General election 2010: Colchester
Party	Candidate	Votes	%	±%
Liberal Democrats	Bob Russell	22,151	48.0	+0.3
Conservative	Will Quince	15,169	32.9	+0.8
Labour	Jordan Newell	5,680	12.3	−7.9
UKIP	John Pitts	1,350	2.9	New
BNP	Sidney Chaney	705	1.5	New
Green	Peter Lynn	694	1.5	New
English Democrat	Eddie Bone	335	0.7	New
Peoples Party Essex	Garryck Noble	35	0.1	New
Independent	Paul Shaw	20	0.0	New
Majority		6,982	15.1	−0.5
Turnout		46,139	62.3	+5.8
Liberal Democrats hold		Swing	−0.2	

=== Elections in the 2000s ===
General election 2005: Colchester
Party	Candidate	Votes	%	±%
Liberal Democrats	Bob Russell	21,145	47.1	+4.5
Conservative	Kevin Bentley	14,868	33.1	+3.2
Labour	Laura Bruni	8,886	19.8	−5.2
Majority		6,277	14.0	+1.3
Turnout		44,899	56.8	+0.7
Liberal Democrats hold		Swing	+0.6	

General election 2001: Colchester
Party	Candidate	Votes	%	±%
Liberal Democrats	Bob Russell	18,627	42.6	+8.2
Conservative	Kevin Bentley	13,074	29.9	−1.5
Labour	Christopher Fegan	10,925	25.0	−5.5
UKIP	Roger Lord	631	1.4	New
Grey Party	Leonard Overy-Owen	479	1.1	New
Majority		5,553	12.7	+9.7
Turnout		43,736	56.1	−13.1
Liberal Democrats hold		Swing	+4.9	

=== Elections in the 1990s ===
General election 1997: Colchester
Party	Candidate	Votes	%	±%
Liberal Democrats	Bob Russell	17,886	34.4	+1.7
Conservative	Stephan Shakespeare	16,335	31.4	−10.6
Labour	Rod Green	15,891	30.5	+6.4
Referendum	John Hazell	1,776	3.4	New
Natural Law	Loretta Basker	148	0.3	New
Majority		1,551	3.0	N/A
Turnout		52,036	69.2	
Liberal Democrats gain from Conservative		Swing	+6.2	

=== Elections in the 1970s ===
General election 1979: Colchester
Party	Candidate	Votes	%	±%
Conservative	Antony Buck	36,740	52.93	
Labour	Bob Russell	22,877	32.96	
Liberal	M Gage	9,794	14.11	
Majority		13,863	19.97	
Turnout		69,411	76.62	
Conservative hold		Swing		

General election October 1974: Colchester
Party	Candidate	Votes	%	±%
Conservative	Antony Buck	27,693	44.45	
Labour	David Whytock	22,193	35.62	
Liberal	D Christian	12,421	19.94	
Majority		5,500	8.83	
Turnout		62,307	76.14	
Conservative hold		Swing		

General election February 1974: Colchester
Party	Candidate	Votes	%	±%
Conservative	Antony Buck	29,072	43.38	
Labour	David Whytock	22,210	33.14	
Liberal	DW Thomas	15,737	23.48	
Majority		6,862	10.24	
Turnout		67,019	82.60	
Conservative hold		Swing		

General election 1970: Colchester
Party	Candidate	Votes	%	±%
Conservative	Antony Buck	30,562	52.57	
Labour	John G Bartlett	20,325	34.96	
Liberal	Peter S Watts	7,248	12.47	
Majority		10,237	17.61	
Turnout		58,135	77.57	
Conservative hold		Swing		

=== Elections in the 1960s ===
General election 1966: Colchester
Party	Candidate	Votes	%	±%
Conservative	Antony Buck	24,320	45.60	
Labour	Michael Meacher	23,305	43.69	
Liberal	Peter S Watts	5,714	10.71	
Majority		1,015	1.91	
Turnout		53,339	82.26	
Conservative hold		Swing		

General election 1964: Colchester
Party	Candidate	Votes	%	±%
Conservative	Antony Buck	23,319	46.03	
Labour	Charles Williams	19,780	39.04	
Liberal	Eric W Rodnight	7,566	14.93	
Majority		3,539	6.99	
Turnout		50,665	82.06	
Conservative hold		Swing		

By Election 1961: Colchester
Party	Candidate	Votes	%	±%
Conservative	Antony Buck	17,891	47.14	−4.46
Labour	John Wilson Fear	12,547	33.06	−2.81
Liberal	Howard Fry	7,487	19.74	+7.26
Majority		5,344	14.08	−1.66
Turnout		37,925		
Conservative hold		Swing	-0.8	

=== Elections in the 1950s ===
General election 1959: Colchester
Party	Candidate	Votes	%	±%
Conservative	Cuthbert Alport	24,592	51.63	
Labour	Joan I. Edmonson	17,096	35.89	
Liberal	Peter M Linfoot	5,942	12.48	New
Majority		7,496	15.74	
Turnout		47,630	82.44	
Conservative hold		Swing		

General election 1955: Colchester
Party	Candidate	Votes	%	±%
Conservative	Cuthbert Alport	24,796	55.48	
Labour Co-op	Norman R Thomas	19,898	44.52	
Majority		4,898	10.96	
Turnout		44,694	80.49	
Conservative hold		Swing		

General election 1951: Colchester
Party	Candidate	Votes	%	±%
Conservative	Cuthbert Alport	25,063	54.16	
Labour	Xenia Field	21,217	45.84	
Majority		3,846	8.32	
Turnout		46,280	84.84	
Conservative hold		Swing		

General election 1950: Colchester
Party	Candidate	Votes	%	±%
Conservative	Cuthbert Alport	21,403	46.50	
Labour	Charles Delacourt-Smith	20,472	44.47	
Liberal	David Goldblatt	4,157	9.03	
Majority		931	2.03	N/A
Turnout		46,032	86.77	
Conservative gain from Labour		Swing		

=== Elections in the 1940s ===
General election 1945: Colchester
Party	Candidate	Votes	%	±%
Labour	Charles Delacourt-Smith	16,587	45.31	
Conservative	Oswald Lewis	14,123	38.58	
Liberal	George Alexander Routledge	5,899	16.11	New
Majority		2,464	6.73	N/A
Turnout		36,609	73.87	
Labour gain from Conservative		Swing		

General Election 1939/40:

Another General Election was required to take place before the end of 1940. The political parties had been making preparations for an election to take place from 1939 and by the end of this year, the following candidates had been selected;

- Conservative: Oswald Lewis
- Labour: Charles Delacourt-Smith

=== Elections in the 1930s ===
General election 1935: Colchester
Party	Candidate	Votes	%	±%
Conservative	Oswald Lewis	19,915	58.65	
Labour	Hubert Beaumont	14,039	41.35	
Majority		5,876	17.30	
Turnout		33,954	74.63	
Conservative hold		Swing		

General election 1931: Colchester
Party	Candidate	Votes	%	±%
Conservative	Oswald Lewis	22,285	67.51	
Labour	Edward Aylmer Digby	10,725	32.49	
Majority		11,560	35.02	
Turnout		33,010	76.38	
Conservative hold		Swing		

=== Elections in the 1920s ===
General election 1929: Colchester
Party	Candidate	Votes	%	±%
Unionist	Oswald Lewis	13,411	40.3	−16.3
Labour	Richard Reiss	12,809	38.5	−4.9
Liberal	William Elliston	6,896	20.7	New
Ind. Unionist	C.C. Gray	172	0.5	New
Majority		602	1.8	−11.4
Turnout		33,288	79.4	+0.6
Registered electors		41,947		
Unionist hold		Swing	−5.7	

General election 1924: Colchester
Party	Candidate	Votes	%	±%
Unionist	Laming Worthington-Evans	14,283	56.6	+13.2
Labour	Richard Reiss	10,953	43.4	+9.2
Majority		3,330	13.2	+4.0
Turnout		25,236	78.8	+0.6
Registered electors		32,009		
Unionist hold		Swing	+2.0	

General election 1923: Colchester
Party	Candidate	Votes	%	±%
Unionist	Laming Worthington-Evans	10,535	43.4	−13.3
Labour	Richard Reiss	8,316	34.2	−9.1
Liberal	Arthur Horne Goldfinch	5,430	22.4	New
Majority		2,219	9.2	−4.2
Turnout		24,281	78.2	+0.3
Registered electors		31,058		
Unionist hold		Swing	−2.1	

Worthington-Evans

General election 1922: Colchester
Party	Candidate	Votes	%	±%
Unionist	Laming Worthington-Evans	13,142	56.7	−4.4
Labour	Richard Reiss	10,045	43.3	+4.4
Majority		3,097	13.4	−8.8
Turnout		23,187	77.9	+17.7
Registered electors		29,779		
Unionist hold		Swing	−4.4	

== Election results 1885–1918 ==
=== Elections in the 1880s ===
Causton

General election 1885: Colchester
Party	Candidate	Votes	%	±%
Conservative	Henry John Trotter	2,044	52.1	+3.7
Liberal	Richard Causton	1,878	47.9	−3.7
Majority		166	4.2	N/A
Turnout		3,922	92.5	+4.1 (est)
Registered electors		4,241		
Conservative win (new seat)				

General election 1886: Colchester
Party	Candidate	Votes	%	±%
Conservative	Henry John Trotter	1,996	54.0	+1.9
Liberal	Richard Causton	1,701	46.0	−1.9
Majority		295	8.0	+2.8
Turnout		3,697	87.2	−5.3
Registered electors		4,241		
Conservative hold		Swing	+1.9	

Trotter's death a caused a by-election.

By-election, 18 Dec 1888: Colchester
Party	Candidate	Votes	%	±%
Conservative	Lord Brooke	2,126	55.8	+1.8
Liberal	William Brampton Gurdon	1,687	44.2	−1.8
Majority		439	11.6	+3.6
Turnout		3,813	86.3	−0.9
Registered electors		4,417		
Conservative hold		Swing	+1.8	

=== Elections in the 1890s ===
General election 1892: Colchester
Party	Candidate	Votes	%	±%
Conservative	Herbert Naylor-Leyland	2,173	50.7	−3.3
Liberal	Weetman Pearson	2,112	49.3	+3.3
Majority		61	1.4	−6.6
Turnout		4,285	85.7	−1.5
Registered electors		5,000		
Conservative hold		Swing	−3.3	

Pearson

1895 Colchester by-election
Party	Candidate	Votes	%	±%
Liberal	Weetman Pearson	2,559	52.7	+3.4
Conservative	John Medlicott Vereker	2,296	47.3	−3.4
Majority		263	5.4	N/A
Turnout		4,855	92.4	+6.7
Registered electors		5,257		
Liberal gain from Conservative		Swing	+3.4	

General election 1895: Colchester
Party	Candidate	Votes	%	±%
Liberal	Weetman Pearson	2,475	52.2	+2.9
Conservative	Edward Samuel Norris	2,270	47.8	−2.9
Majority		205	4.4	N/A
Turnout		4,745	90.3	+4.6
Registered electors		5,257		
Liberal gain from Conservative		Swing	+2.9	

=== Elections in the 1900s ===
General election 1900: Colchester
Party	Candidate	Votes	%	±%
Liberal	Weetman Pearson	2,548	52.8	+0.6
Conservative	Trevenen Holland	2,274	47.2	−0.6
Majority		274	5.6	+1.2
Turnout		4,822	85.1	−5.2
Registered electors		5,663		
Liberal hold		Swing	+0.6	

General election 1906: Colchester
Party	Candidate	Votes	%	±%
Liberal	Weetman Pearson	3,122	52.6	−0.2
Conservative	Laming Worthington-Evans	2,812	47.4	+0.2
Majority		310	5.2	−0.4
Turnout		5,934	92.3	+7.2
Registered electors		6,426		
Liberal hold		Swing	−0.2	

=== Elections in the 1910s ===
General election January 1910: Colchester
Party	Candidate	Votes	%	±%
Conservative	Laming Worthington-Evans	3,717	56.0	+8.6
Liberal	Frederick Whitley-Thomson	2,926	44.0	−8.6
Majority		791	12.0	N/A
Turnout		6,643	91.9	−0.4
Conservative gain from Liberal		Swing	+8.6	

General election December 1910: Colchester
Party	Candidate	Votes	%	±%
Conservative	Laming Worthington-Evans	3,489	54.8	−1.2
Liberal	Edgar Vincent	2,874	45.2	+1.2
Majority		615	9.6	−2.4
Turnout		6,363	88.1	−3.8
Conservative hold		Swing	−1.2	

General Election 1914/15:

Another General Election was required to take place before the end of 1915. The political parties had been making preparations for an election to take place and by July 1914, the following candidates had been selected;

- Unionist: Laming Worthington-Evans
- Liberal: Arthur Horne Goldfinch
- Labour: Robert Morley

General election 1918: Colchester
Party		Candidate	Votes	%	±%
C	Unionist	Sir Laming Worthington-Evans	11,186	61.1	+6.3
	Labour	Andrew Conley	7,112	38.9	New
Majority			4,074	22.2	+12.6
Turnout			18,298	60.2	−27.9
Registered electors			30,372		
	Unionist hold		Swing		
C indicates candidate endorsed by the coalition government.

== Election results 1832–1885 ==
=== Elections in the 1830s ===
General election 1832: Colchester
Party	Candidate	Votes	%	±%
Tory	Richard Sanderson	648	48.7	+18.5
Radical	Daniel Whittle Harvey	411	30.9	−4.6
Whig	William Mayhew	272	20.4	−13.9
Turnout		991	90.2	c. +16.3
Registered electors		1,099		
Majority		376	28.3	N/A
Tory gain from Whig				
Majority		139	10.5	+9.3
Radical hold		Swing	−11.6	

General election 1835: Colchester
Party	Candidate	Votes	%	±%
Conservative	Richard Sanderson	637	37.3	+13.0
Conservative	George Smyth	568	33.2	+8.9
Whig	Henry Tufnell	505	29.5	+9.1
Majority		63	3.7	−24.6
Turnout		1,040	90.3	+0.1
Registered electors		1,152		
Conservative hold				
Conservative gain from Radical		Swing	+2.2	

General election 1837: Colchester
Party	Candidate	Votes	%	±%
Conservative	Richard Sanderson	472	38.9	+1.6
Conservative	George Smyth	435	35.9	+2.7
Radical	James Ruddell-Todd	306	25.2	N/A
Majority		129	10.7	+7.0
Turnout		739	62.9	−27.4
Registered electors		1,175		
Conservative hold		Swing		
Conservative hold				

=== Elections in the 1840s ===
General election 1841: Colchester
Party	Candidate	Votes	%	±%
Conservative	Richard Sanderson	Unopposed		
Conservative	George Smyth	Unopposed		
Registered electors		1,176		
Conservative hold				
Conservative hold				

General election 1847: Colchester
Party	Candidate	Votes	%	±%
Conservative	George Smyth	678	37.6	N/A
Whig	Joseph Hardcastle	596	33.0	New
Conservative	Richard Sanderson	531	29.4	N/A
Turnout		903 (est)	71.7 (est)	N/A
Registered electors		1,258		
Majority		82	4.6	N/A
Conservative hold		Swing	N/A	
Majority		65	3.6	N/A
Whig gain from Conservative		Swing	N/A	

=== Elections in the 1850s ===
Smyth's resignation caused a by-election.

By-election, 9 February 1850: Colchester
Party	Candidate	Votes	%	±%
Conservative	Lord John Manners	622	61.5	−5.5
Whig	George Wingrove Cooke	389	38.5	+5.5
Majority		233	23.0	+18.4
Turnout		1,011 (est)	80.9 (est)	+9.2
Registered electors		1,250		
Conservative hold		Swing	−5.5	

Manners was appointed First Commissioner of Works, requiring a by-election.

By-election, 4 March 1852: Colchester
Party	Candidate	Votes	%	±%
Conservative	Lord John Manners	Unopposed		
Conservative hold				

General election 1852: Colchester
Party	Candidate	Votes	%	±%
Conservative	William Warwick Hawkins	686	36.7	−0.9
Conservative	Lord John Manners	615	32.9	+3.5
Whig	Joseph Hardcastle	468	25.1	−7.9
Conservative	Henry Thoby Prinsep	98	5.2	N/A
Majority		147	7.8	+3.2
Turnout		934 (est)	74.2 (est)	+2.5
Registered electors		1,258		
Conservative hold		Swing	+1.5	
Conservative gain from Whig		Swing	+3.7	

Manners resigned to contest the 1857 by-election in North Leicestershire, causing a by-election.

By-election, 24 February 1857: Colchester
Party	Candidate	Votes	%	±%
Radical	John Gurdon Rebow	563	54.6	N/A
Conservative	Taverner John Miller	462	44.8	N/A
Radical	William Rawdon Havens	7	0.7	N/A
Majority		101	9.8	N/A
Turnout		1,032 (est)	80.5 (est)	+6.3
Registered electors		1,282		
Radical gain from Conservative		Swing	N/A	

General election 1857: Colchester
Party	Candidate	Votes	%	±%
Conservative	Taverner John Miller	599	48.8	N/A
Radical	John Gurdon Rebow	581	47.3	N/A
Radical	William Rawdon Havens	48	3.9	N/A
Majority		18	1.5	−6.3
Turnout		614 (est)	47.9 (est)	−26.3
Registered electors		1,282		
Conservative hold		Swing	N/A	
Radical gain from Conservative		Swing	N/A	

General election 1859: Colchester
Party	Candidate	Votes	%	±%
Conservative	Taverner John Miller	651	36.8	+12.4
Conservative	Philip Oxenden Papillon	598	33.8	+9.4
Liberal	John Gurdon Rebow	518	29.3	−18.0
Majority		80	4.5	+3.0
Turnout		884 (est)	70.3 (est)	+22.4
Registered electors		1,257		
Conservative hold		Swing	+10.7	
Conservative gain from Liberal		Swing	+9.2	

=== Elections in the 1860s ===
General election 1865: Colchester (2 seats)
Party	Candidate	Votes	%	±%
Liberal	John Gurdon Rebow	691	36.5	+7.2
Conservative	Taverner John Miller	640	33.8	−3.0
Conservative	Philip Oxenden Papillon	561	29.7	−4.1
Majority		130	6.8	N/A
Turnout		1,292 (est)	91.9 (est)	+21.6
Registered electors		1,405		
Liberal gain from Conservative		Swing	+7.2	
Conservative hold		Swing	−3.3	

Miller resigned, causing a by-election.

By-election, 15 Feb 1867: Colchester (1 seat)
Party	Candidate	Votes	%	±%
Conservative	Edward Karslake	675	53.0	−10.5
Liberal	William Brewer	598	47.0	+10.5
Majority		77	6.0	N/A
Turnout		1,273	90.6	−1.3
Registered electors		1,405		
Conservative hold		Swing	−10.5	

General election 1868: Colchester (2 seats)
Party	Candidate	Votes	%	±%
Liberal	John Gurdon Rebow	1,467	27.2	+8.9
Liberal	William Brewer	1,417	26.3	+8.0
Conservative	Edward Karslake	1,284	23.8	−10.0
Conservative	Alexander Learmonth	1,217	22.6	−7.1
Majority		133	2.5	−4.3
Turnout		2,693 (est)	90.7 (est)	−1.2
Registered electors		3,183		
Liberal hold		Swing	+8.0	
Liberal gain from Conservative		Swing	+9.0	

=== Elections in the 1870s ===
Rebow's death caused a by-election.

By-election, 3 Nov 1870: Colchester (1 seat)
Party	Candidate	Votes	%	±%
Conservative	Alexander Learmonth	1,363	61.5	+15.1
Liberal	Henry Knight Storks	853	38.5	−15.0
Majority		510	23.0	N/A
Turnout		2,216	70.5	−20.2
Registered electors		3,145		
Conservative gain from Liberal		Swing	+15.1	

General election 1874: Colchester (2 seats)
Party	Candidate	Votes	%	±%
Conservative	Alexander Learmonth	1,515	28.0	+5.4
Conservative	Herbert Mackworth-Praed	1,407	26.0	+2.2
Liberal	William Brewer	1,279	23.6	−2.7
Liberal	Richard Causton	1,218	22.5	−4.7
Majority		128	2.4	N/A
Turnout		2,710 (est)	85.1 (est)	−5.6
Registered electors		3,183		
Conservative gain from Liberal		Swing	+4.1	
Conservative gain from Liberal		Swing	+3.5	

=== Elections in the 1880s ===
Causton

General election 1880: Colchester (2 seats)
Party	Candidate	Votes	%	±%
Liberal	Richard Causton	1,738	26.5	+4.0
Liberal	William Willis	1,650	25.1	+1.5
Conservative	Alexander Learmonth	1,648	25.1	−2.9
Conservative	Francis Jeune	1,529	23.3	−2.7
Majority		2	0.0	N/A
Turnout		3,283 (est)	88.4 (est)	−0.7
Registered electors		3,713		
Liberal gain from Conservative		Swing	+3.5	
Liberal gain from Conservative		Swing	+2.1	

== Elections before 1832 ==
General election 1831: Colchester
Party	Candidate	Votes	%	±%
Radical	Daniel Whittle Harvey	617	35.5	−4.8
Whig	William Mayhew	595	34.3	+10.0
Tory	Richard Sanderson	524	30.2	−5.2
Turnout		1,109	c. 73.9	
Registered electors		c. 1,500		
Majority		22	1.2	−3.7
Radical hold		Swing	−7.4	
Majority		71	4.1	N/A
Whig gain from Tory		Swing	+7.6	

By-election, 9 April 1831: Colchester
Party	Candidate	Votes	%	±%
Whig	William Mayhew	604	55.2	+30.9
Tory	Sir William Curtis, 2nd Baronet	490	44.8	+9.4
Majority		114	10.4	N/A
Turnout		1,094	c. 72.9	
Registered electors		c. 1,500		
Whig gain from Tory		Swing	+10.8	

- Caused by Spottiswoode being unseated on petition

General election 1830: Colchester
Party	Candidate	Votes	%	±%
Radical	Daniel Whittle Harvey	650	40.3	
Tory	Andrew Spottiswoode	571	35.4	
Whig	William Mayhew	393	24.3	
Turnout		1,614		
Registered electors		c. 1,500		
Majority		79	4.9	
Radical hold		Swing		
Majority		178	11.1	'
Tory hold		Swing		

== See also ==
- parliamentary constituencies in Essex

== Sources ==
- Robert Beatson, "A Chronological Register of Both Houses of Parliament" (London: Longman, Hurst, Res & Orme, 1807) A Chronological Register of Both Houses of the British Parliament, from the Union in 1708, to the Third Parliament of the United Kingdom of Great Britain and Ireland, in 1807
- D Brunton & D H Pennington, Members of the Long Parliament (London: George Allen & Unwin, 1954)
- Cobbett's Parliamentary history of England, from the Norman Conquest in 1066 to the year 1803 (London: Thomas Hansard, 1808) titles A-Z
- F W S Craig, "British Parliamentary Election Results 1832-1885" (2nd edition, Aldershot: Parliamentary Research Services, 1989)
- J E Neale, The Elizabethan House of Commons (London: Jonathan Cape, 1949)
- Henry Stooks Smith, The Parliaments of England from 1715 to 1847 (2nd edition, edited by FWS Craig - Chichester: Parliamentary Reference Publications, 1973)
- Victoria County History of Essex online at www.british-history.ac.uk
