= Robert Barker (MP for Colchester) =

English politician

Robert Barker (1563 – 5 April 1618) was an English politician.

== Biography ==
He was the third son of John Barker, a merchant of Bildeston, Suffolk. He was educated at St John's College, Cambridge and trained for law at the Inner Temple.

He was the Member of Parliament for Colchester, Essex four times between 1597 and 1621.

He became a JP for Harwich in 1601 and Essex in 1607 (until 1617) and was made Serjeant-at-Law for Colchester in 1612. He died in at Monkwick in 1618.

== Family ==
He had married Margaret, the daughter of Robert Coke of Mileham, Suffolk; they had two sons and three daughters. he was succeeded by his eldest son Bestney.

== Notes ==
Parliament of England
Preceded by James Morice; Martin Bessell	Member of Parliament for Colchester; 1597–1621; With: Richard Symnell (1597–1604); Edward Alford (1604–1621)	Succeeded by Edward Alford; William Towse
