= Richard Reiss =

British Liberal Party politician

Richard Leopold Reiss (20 May 1883 – 30 September 1959), was a British Liberal Party politician who later joined the Labour Party. He was Director of the Hampstead Garden Suburb Trust Ltd. He was awarded the Order of St Olav of Norway. In 1948 he was awarded the Howard Memorial Medal for outstanding services to town planning.

== Political career ==
Reiss was active first for the Liberal Party, both as a policy developer and as a parliamentary candidate. He later joined the Labour Party, standing as a parliamentary candidate. He worked primarily in the fields of land reform, housing and town planning and had published a number of works. In all, he stood for parliament on eight occasions, without success.

=== Liberal Party ===
==== Chichester ====
Reiss first stood for parliament at the age of 27, as Liberal candidate for the safe Conservative seat of Chichester at both the January and December 1910 general elections.

General Election January 1910: Chichester
Party	Candidate	Votes	%	±%
Conservative	Edmund FitzAlan-Howard	6,589	66.4	+10.0
Liberal	Richard Reiss	3,338	33.6	−10.0
Majority		3,251	32.8	+20.0
Turnout			81.7	−0.4
Conservative hold		Swing	+10.0	

General Election December 1910: Chichester
Party	Candidate	Votes	%	±%
Conservative	Edmund FitzAlan-Howard	5,900	66.4	0.0
Liberal	Richard Reiss	2,985	33.6	0.0
Majority		2,915	32.8	0.0
Turnout			73.1	−8.6
Conservative hold		Swing	0.0	

==== Land reform ====
Roden Buxton

He worked with Roden Buxton at the National Land and Home League, and was appointed Chair of the Housing sub-committee in 1911. In 1912, Reiss was employed by Chancellor of the Exchequer, David Lloyd George as Head Organiser of the Rural Land Inquiry, which was given the task of formulating new Liberal land reform policy in advance of the general election. He organised an enquiry into conditions in over 2,000 villages in England and Wales and drafted most of the rural report which was published under the title 'The Land' (Vol. I. Rural). However, that work was cut short by the outbreak of war in 1914 and the election postponed until after the war.

==== St Pancras ====
The St Pancras East Liberal Association and the constituency's Liberal MP, Joseph Martin had a difficult relationship. By 1914 the association did not want Martin to continue as their MP and in May selected Reiss to be their candidate for the general election expected to be called late 1914/early 1915. Martin said he would resign his seat and contest the resulting by-election as an Independent Lib-Lab candidate. Confronted with the prospect of losing the by-election to the Unionist, due to a split Liberal vote, the Liberal association told Martin in June that they would not contest the by-election. In July Martin announced that he would instead resign his seat and return to his native Canada, allowing Reiss to run against a Unionist in the by-election. Martin changed his mind again and decided not to resign his seat. In August war was declared, the general election was deferred, Reiss resigned as candidate to enlisted and Martin continued as MP. Relations between Martin and the association continued to be uncertain through into 1917. The association were keen to have a candidate in place in the event of a Martin resignation, so they selected Percy Adams as their candidate in July 1917. The following month, after being wounded in the war, Reiss returned to England. He was immediately seconded by Lloyd George to the Ministry of Reconstruction to work under Christopher Addison on tackling housing problems once the war was over.

In 1918 Reiss sought election to parliament for the newly created St Pancras South East constituency. The constituency was created from the Unionist held seat of St Pancras South and the Liberal seat of St Pancras East. In 1917 the Liberal MP for East, Joseph Martin decided to retire from parliament at the next general election. When the new South East constituency was created in 1918, the newly formed South East liberal association in April 1918, selected Reiss as their candidate. Reiss immediately won the support of his former employer, now Prime Minister Lloyd George. In December 1917, the Unionists had selected their candidate for the new South East seat, namely John Hopkins, who had been their candidate for St Pancras East since 1910.

When candidate nominations closed for the 1918 general election, there were four candidates in the field; Reiss (Liberal), Hopkins (Unionist), Romeril (Labour) and Adams, who had been chosen by the Liberals the previous year to fight the old East seat. Of the four candidates, only the Labour candidate was not a declared supporter of the Coalition Government. Reiss assumed that he would be endorsed by the Coalition Government, since Lloyd George had publicly supported him when he was selected back in the spring. Coalition Government endorsement was initially issued to him but subsequently withdrawn. Joseph Martin, the retiring Liberal MP for St Pancras East, had crossed the floor to join the Labour Party and endorsed Reiss's Labour Party opponent. These factors combined to deny Reiss victory.

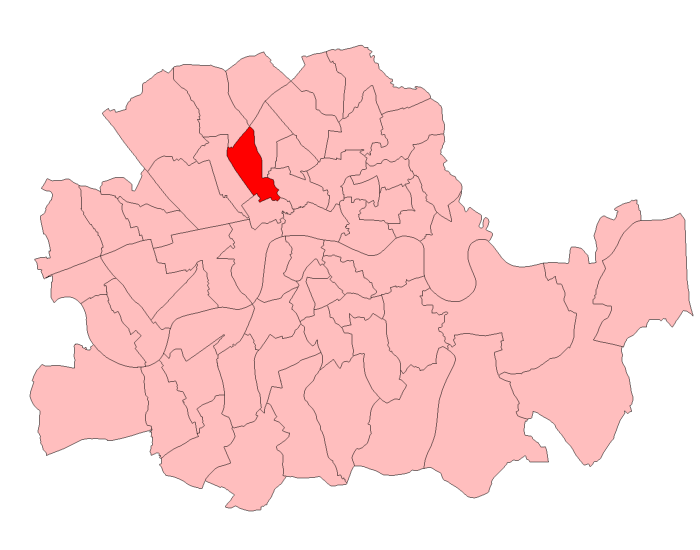
St Pancras South East in London 1918

General Election 14 December 1918: St Pancras South-East
Party	Candidate	Votes	%	±%
Unionist	John Hopkins	4,884	37.8	n/a
Liberal	Richard Reiss	3,594	27.8	n/a
Independent Liberal	Percy Adams	2,263	17.5	n/a
Labour	Herbert Romeril	2,189	16.9	n/a
Majority		1,290	10.0	n/a
Turnout			47.2	n/a
Unionist win				

=== Labour Party ===
==== Colchester ====
Reiss stood for parliament as a Labour Party candidate for Colchester on four occasions; 1922, 1923, 1924 and 1929.

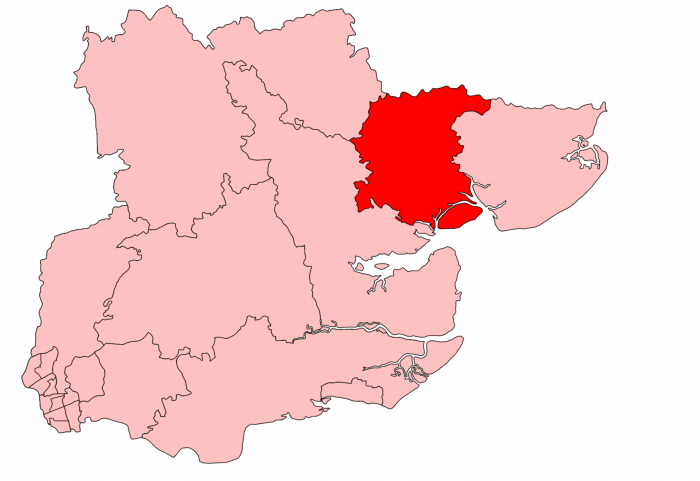
Colchester in Essex 1920s

General Election 1923: Colchester
Party	Candidate	Votes	%	±%
Unionist	Laming Worthington-Evans	10,535	43.4	−13.3
Labour	Richard Reiss	8,316	34.2	−9.1
Liberal	Arthur Horne Goldfinch	5,430	22.4	n/a
Majority		2,219	9.2	−4.2
Turnout			78.2	
Unionist hold		Swing	-2.1	

General Election 1929: Colchester
Party	Candidate	Votes	%	±%
Unionist	Oswald Lewis	13,411	40.3	
Labour	Richard Reiss	12,809	38.5	
Liberal	William Elliston	6,896	20.7	n/a
Ind. Unionist	C.C. Gray	172	0.5	n/a
Majority		602	1.8	
Turnout				
Unionist hold		Swing		

==== Preston ====
Reiss did not contest the 1931 General election. He unsuccessfully contested the dual member seat of Preston at the 1935 General Election. He did not stand for parliament again.

General Election 1935: Preston (2 seats)
Party	Candidate	Votes	%	±%
Conservative	Adrian Moreing	37,219	26.9	
Conservative	William Kirkpatrick	36,797	26.7	
Labour	Robert Arthur Lyster	32,225	23.3	
Labour	Richard Reiss	31,827	23.1	
Majority		4,572	3.4	
Turnout			81.9	
Conservative hold		Swing		

=== Publications ===
- 1913 – LAND ENQUIRY COMMITTEE REPORT : RURAL
- 1918 – THE HOME I WANT
- 1918 – (March) – paper to TPI Reconstruction with particular reference to housing.
- 1921 – TOWN THEORY AND PRACTICE (Joint)
- 1924 – THE NEW HOUSING HANDBOOK
- 1924 – COPEC COMMISSION REPORT : VOL III – THE HOME
- 1926 – THE TOWN PLANNING HANDBOOK
- 1937 – BRITISH AND AMERICAN HOUSING (NPHC)
- 1937 – (June) – paper to TPI Recent developments in city planning and housing in the USA
- 1945 – MUNICIPAL AND PRIVATE ENTERPRISE HOUSING (Dent)
