= John Makin =

John Makin may refer to:

- John Makin (politician), 16th-century member of parliament for Colchester
- John H. Makin (1943–2015), American economist
- John Makin (singer) (1950–2011), British-Belgian singer
