= William Brewer (MP) =

British Liberal Party politician

William Brewer MP

Member of Parliament for Colchester
- In office 18 November 1868 – 3 February 1874 Serving with Alexander Learmonth (1870–1874); John Gurdon Rebow (1868–1870)
- Preceded by: John Gurdon Rebow; Edward Karslake
- Succeeded by: Alexander Learmonth; Herbert Mackworth-Praed

Personal details
- Born: 1811
- Died: 3 November 1881 (aged 69–70)
- Party: Liberal

William Brewer (1811 – 3 November 1881) was a British Liberal Party politician.

Brewer first stood for election at Colchester at a by-election in 1867 but was successful. He was then elected MP for the seat in 1868 but lost the seat at the next election in 1874.

From 18 January 1878 to his death, Brewer was also a member of the Metropolitan Board of Works for the Vestry of St George Hanover Square.

Parliament of the United Kingdom
| Preceded by John Gurdon Rebow; Edward Karslake | Member of Parliament for Colchester; 1868–1874; With: Alexander Learmonth (1870–1874); John Gurdon Rebow (1868–1870) | Succeeded by Alexander Learmonth; Herbert Mackworth-Praed |
