= George Sayer =

George Sayer may refer to:

- George Sayer (biographer) (1914–2005), teacher and biographer
- George Sayer (Royal Navy officer) (1773–1831)
- George Sayer (MP for Canterbury) (c. 1655–1718), English courtier and politician
- George Sayer (MP for Colchester), member of parliament (MP) for Colchester
- George Sayer (priest) (died 1761), Archdeacon of Durham

== See also ==
- George Sawyer (disambiguation)
