= Lowth =

Lowth is a surname. Notable people with the surname include:

- Alfred Lowth (1817-1907), English cricketer
- Ambrose Lowth (d. 1545), English politician
- Colin Lowth (born 1987), English swimmer
- Edward Lowth Badeley (1803/1804–1868), English lawyer
- John Lowth (1822–1877), American lawyer
- Robert Lowth (1710–1787), English Anglican bishop
- Simon Lowth (1636–1720), English clergyman
- Thomas Lowth (1858–1931), English politician
- William Lowth (1660–1732), English clergyman
