= John Pod =

English politician

John Pod (died 1411) was an English politician and merchant who sat as MP for Colchester in 1411.

He married Alice before May 1406 and had one son.

== Biography ==
His early life was marked by legal troubles, including fines for polluting a brook, theft accusations, disputes with servants, unpaid rents, and repeated lawsuits over commercial debts, which led to several periods of outlawry and purchased pardons. Despite this, he maintained a substantial trading business, chiefly exporting cloth finished on his own premises and importing various goods such as bitumen, wax, wood, and iron. He also undertook local work, including repairs to church vestments.

Over time Pod became a figure of some standing in Colchester: he held property, acted as a feoffee for others, secured the lucrative farm of duties on imported goods through New Hythe, and served as surety in parliamentary elections. He was elected to Parliament in 1411 but died before the session concluded, being referred to as deceased by December of that year. His will does not survive.
