= Francis Harvey (MP for Colchester) =

16th-century English politician

Francis Harvey (1534–1602) was an English politician.

== Life ==
He was born in 1534, the second son of John Harvey of Ickworth, Suffolk by Elizabeth, daughter of Henry Pope of Mildenhall, Suffolk.

In 1571 and 1584–1587, he was the Member of Parliament for Colchester, Essex as the nominee of Sir Francis Walsingham. In 1589, he was elected MP for Knaresborough and in 1593 MP for Chippenham.

He married, firstly, Mary, daughter and coheiress of Thomas Neville of Holt, Leicestershire and the widow of Sir John Smithand and, secondly, Camillia, the daughter of Vincent Guiccardini, Florentine merchant, who was the widow of Thomas Darcy of Tolleshunt D’Arcy, Essex. He had one daughter.
