= John Clere (MP for Colchester) =

English politician

John Clere (by 1479–1539), was an English politician.

He was a Member of Parliament (MP) for Colchester 1512 and 1515.
