= John Gurdon Rebow =

English Liberal Party politician

John Gurdon Rebow (né John Gurdon; 1799 - 11 October 1870) was an English Liberal Party politician who sat in the House of Commons in two periods between 1857 and 1870.

John Gurdon was the son of Theophilus Thornhaugh Gurdon of Letton, Norfolk, and his wife, Anne Mellish, daughter of William Mellish MP. He was educated at Eton College. On his marriage in 1835, he adopted the additional name of Rebow. He was a Deputy Lieutenant and J.P for Essex, as well as being a founding member of the Essex Archaeological Society.

At the 1847 general election, Rebow stood unsuccessfully for parliament at North Essex. He was High Sheriff of Essex in 1853 and was also High Steward of Colchester. In February 1857 he was elected at a by-election as a Member of Parliament (MP) for Colchester. He was re-elected at the general election in March 1857 but was defeated at the 1859 general election. At the 1865 general election he was re-elected for Colchester, and held until his death in 1870, at age 71.

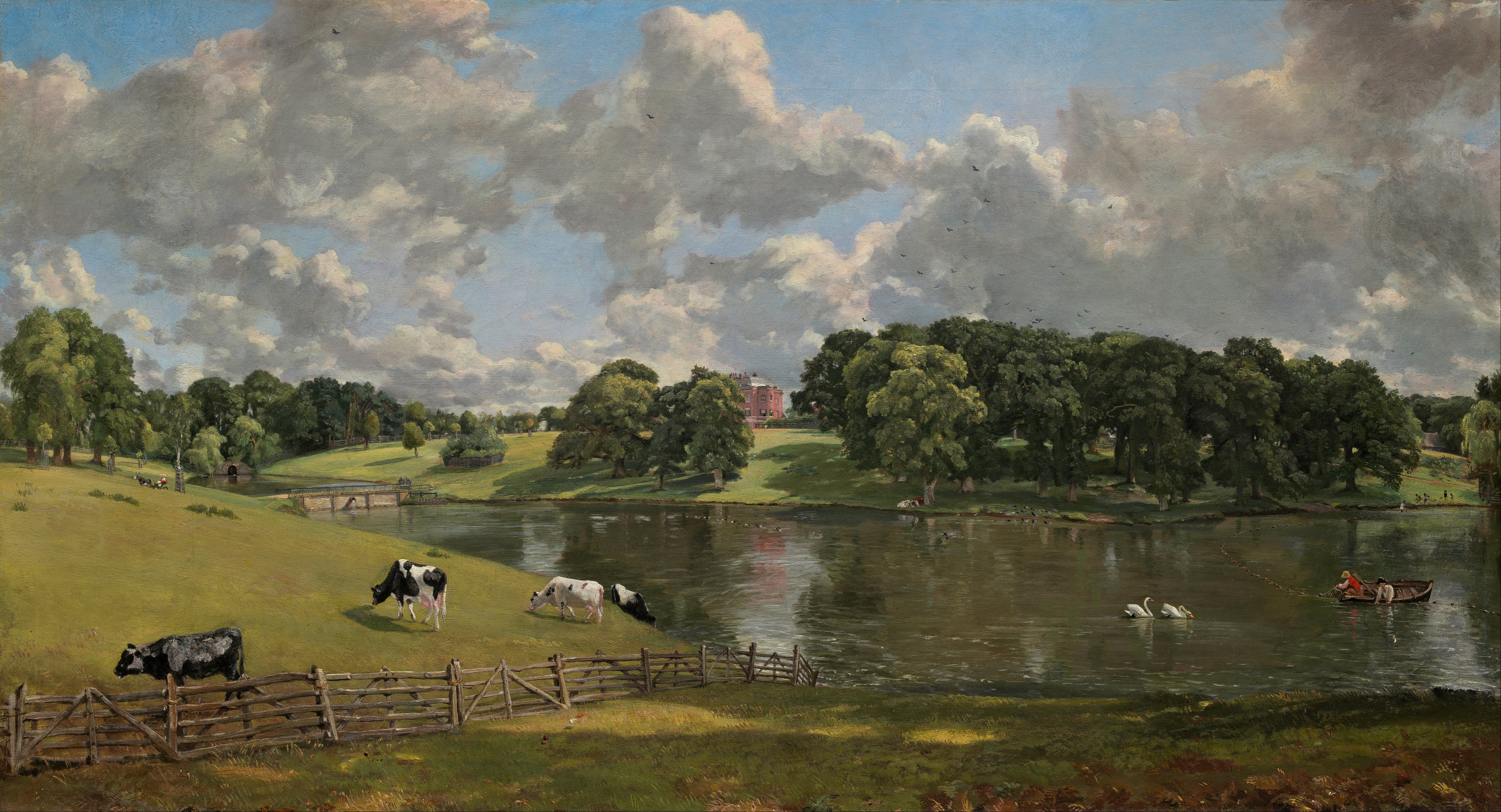
Wivenhoe Park by John Constable in 1816, when Mary was a child there

Rebow married firstly in 1835 Mary Ormsby, daughter of General Slater Rebow of Wivenhoe Park, and widow of Sir Thomas Ormsby, 3rd Baronet. He married secondly in 1845 Lady Georgina Graham-Toler, daughter of Hector Graham-Toler, 2nd Earl of Norbury.

Parliament of the United Kingdom
Preceded by Lord John Manners; William Warwick Hawkins	Member of Parliament for Colchester; 1857–1859; With: William Warwick Hawkins to March 1857; Taverner Miller from March 1857	Succeeded by Philip Papillon; Taverner Miller
Preceded by Philip Papillon; Taverner Miller	Member of Parliament for Colchester; 1865–1870; With: Taverner Miller to 1867; Edward Karslake 1867–1868; William Brewer from 1868	Succeeded by Alexander Learmonth; William Brewer
