= William Mate =

English politician

William Mate was an English politician who served several times as bailiff and as MP for Colchester in 1393, 1406 and 1407.

He was the son of William Mate, bailiff of Colchester in 1369 and Joan. He married Alice before February 1392. He may be the father of Simon Mate, who also served as MP for Colchester.

On 1 December 1382, he executed his father's will and was left property in Holy Trinity parish, Colchester. His mother disputed his inheritance in 1385.
