= John Shaw (died 1690) =

English politician

Sir John Shaw (c. 1617 – 1690) was an English politician who sat in the House of Commons between 1659 and 1679.

Shaw was the son of John Shaw of Colchester and his wife Mary Lufkin. His father was an alderman who supported the Royalist cause in the English Civil War.

In 1659, Shaw was elected Member of Parliament for Colchester in the Third Protectorate Parliament. He was re-elected MP for Colchester for the Convention Parliament in 1660 and for the Cavalier Parliament in 1661 and sat until 1679.

In 1660 Shaw became Recorder of Colchester when his father was restored to his rank as alderman. He was knighted at Whitehall on 24 September 1661

Shaw married Thamar Lewes in 1643 and had several children.

Shaw is buried in the churchyard of Holy Trinity Church, Colchester.

Parliament of England
| Preceded by Henry Lawrence; John Maidstone | Member of Parliament for Colchester; 1659; With: Abraham Johnston | Succeeded by Not represented in restored Rump |
| Preceded by Not represented in restored Rump | Member of Parliament for Colchester; 1660–1679; With: Sir Harbottle Grimston, 2nd Baronet | Succeeded by Sir Harbottle Grimston, 2nd Baronet; Sir Walter Clarges, 1st Baronet |
