= Henry Boss =

English politician

Henry Boss was an English politician and merchant who served as MP for Colchester in January 1397, 1402 and 1406.

He married and had one son, Henry.
