= Francis Jobson =

English Member of Parliament

Sir Francis Jobson (by 1509-73), of Monkwick, near Colchester, Essex, was an English Member of Parliament (MP).

Jobson married Elizabeth Plantagenet, the daughter of Arthur Plantagenet, 1st Viscount Lisle and the half-sister of John Dudley. Through her father, who was illegitimate, she was the granddaughter of King Edward IV and a first cousin of Henry VIII. They had at least four sons and one daughter.

Jobson was knighted in 1549 or 1550, during the reign of Edward VI, during the period when his brother-in-law became Duke of Northumberland and de facto regent during the minority of Edward VI. Jobson was a Member of the Parliament of England for Colchester in March 1553, April 1554, 1555, 1559 and 1563.
