= John Hering =

English politician

John Hering (by 1503 – 1558/1563) was an English politician who sat as MP for Colchester in 1555 and Lostwithiel in 1558.

He was admitted to Lincoln's Inn on 1 March 1517. He married Alice by 1535.
