= Edward Karslake =

Edward Karslake MP

Member of Parliament for Colchester
- In office 15 February 1867 – 18 November 1868 Serving with John Gurdon Rebow
- Preceded by: John Gurdon Rebow; Taverner John Miller
- Succeeded by: John Gurdon Rebow; William Brewer

Personal details
- Born: Edward Kent Karslake; 1820 UK
- Died: 31 May 1892 (aged 71–72) UK
- Party: Conservative

Edward Kent Karslake (1820 – 31 May 1892) was a British Conservative Party politician.

Karslake was educated at Harrow School and Christ Church Oxford - 1st Class Classics BA 1841. He became a fellow of Bailliol College 1840-1850 and practiced as a Barrister from 1846. He was elected MP for Colchester at a by-election in 1867 but lost the seat at the next election in 1868.

Parliament of the United Kingdom
Preceded by John Gurdon Rebow; Taverner John Miller	Member of Parliament for Colchester; 1867–1868; With: John Gurdon Rebow	Succeeded by John Gurdon Rebow; William Brewer
