= George Sawyer =

George Sawyer may refer to:

- George Sawyer (comedian) (fl. 2000s–2020s), British comedian
- George Francis Sawyer (1871–1960), British politician
- George Yeaton Sawyer (1805–1882), justice of the New Hampshire Supreme Court

== See also ==
- George Sayer (disambiguation)
