= Holy Trinity Church, Colchester =

Historic Anglo-Saxon church

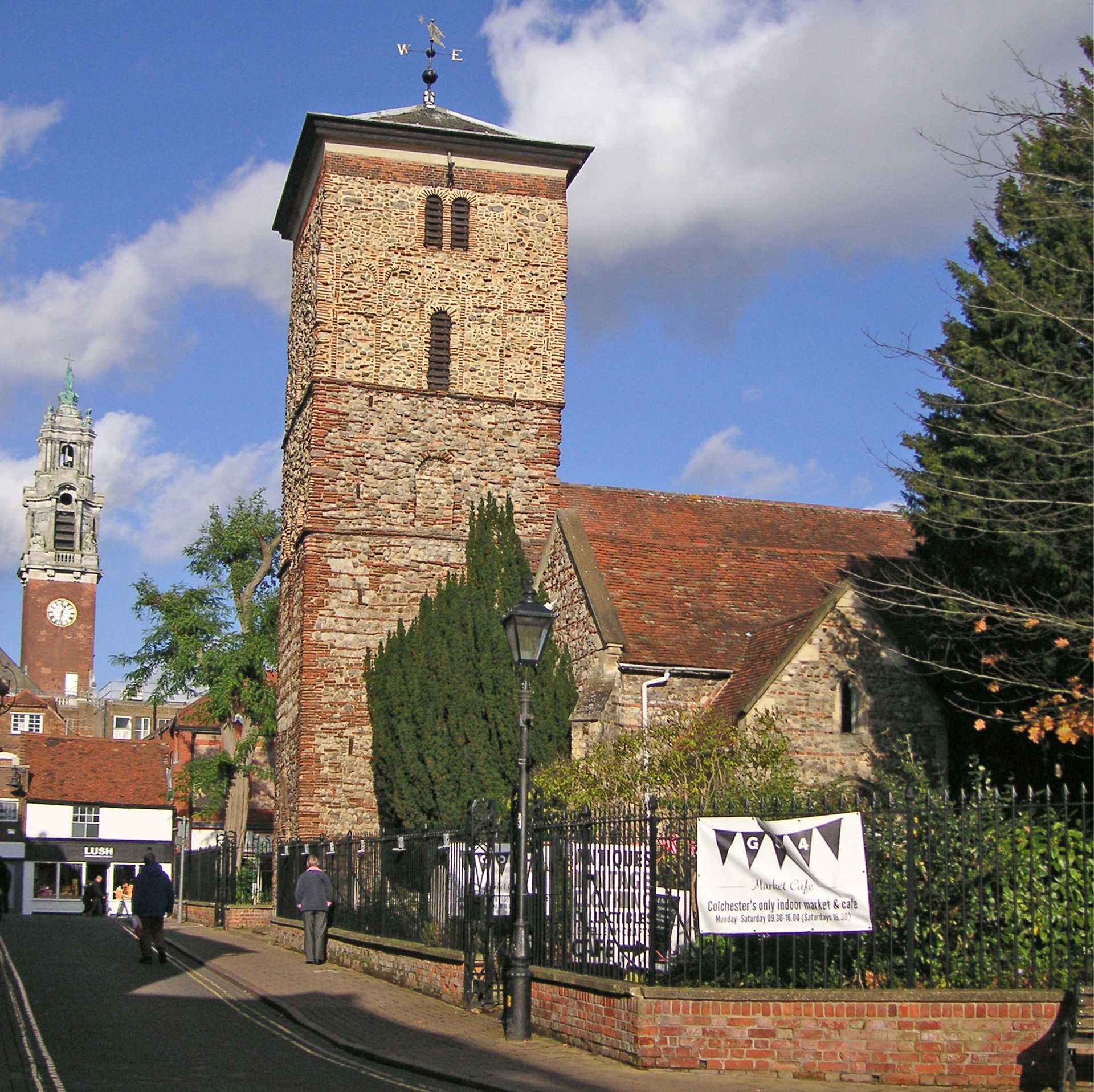

General information
- Location: Colchester, Essex, United Kingdom
- Coordinates: 51.888°N 0.899°E
- Year built: Mid 11th century

Holy Trinity Church is a historic former church in Colchester, Essex. It is Colchester's oldest standing building, and the only Anglo-Saxon building still standing in the city. It has been Grade I listed since 1950.

Holy Trinity Church was a parish church until 1953. Following this it has mostly been vacant, except a brief period as a museum of rural life from 1974 to 1997. Recently, Colchester City Council have developed plans to turn the building into a community hub and event space; work has begun on the roof and churchyard.

== Description ==
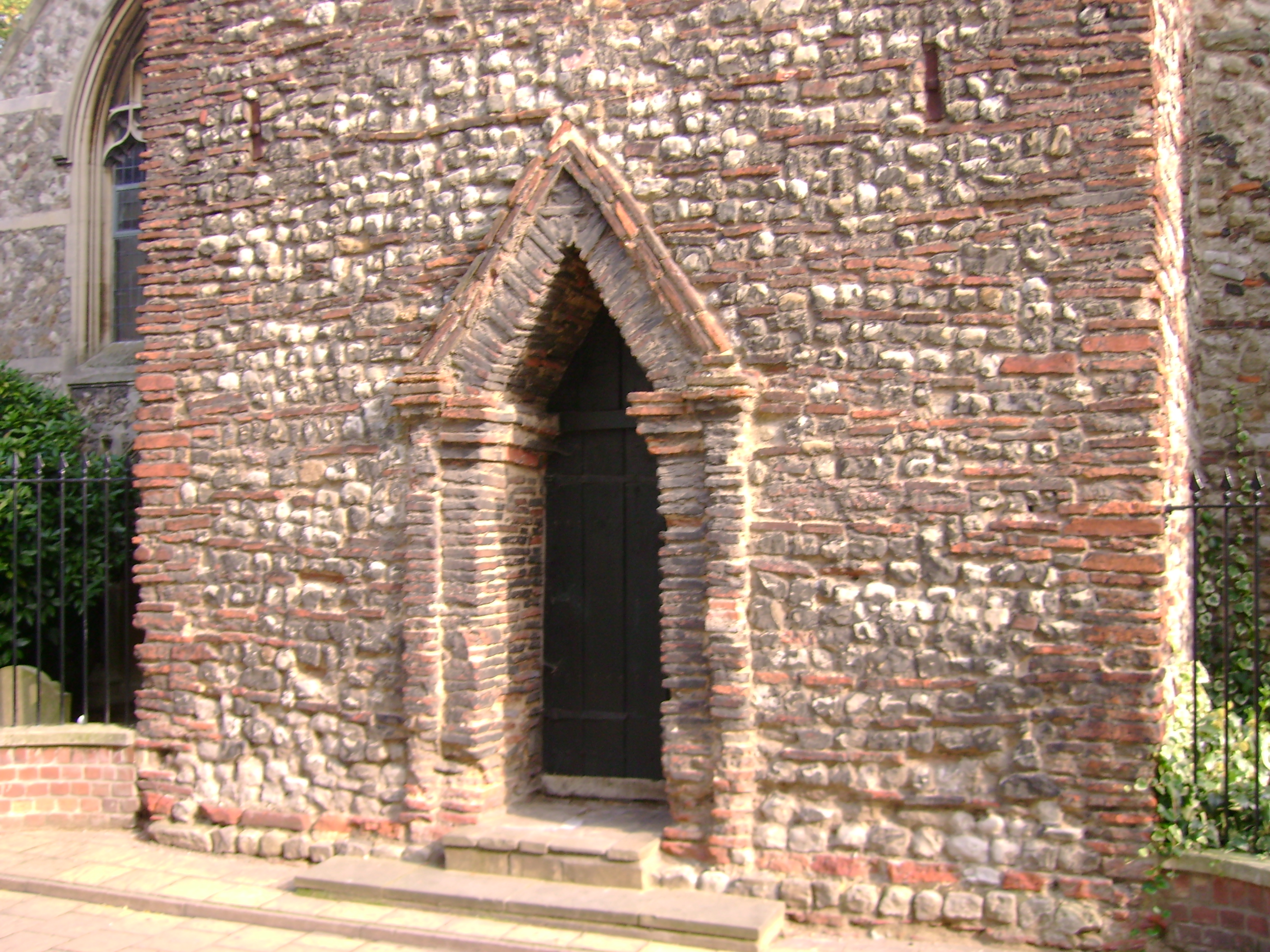
Pointed Saxon doorway of Holy Trinity Church

There was a church on the present site by circa 1000, of which only the west wall remains. The oldest substantially-remaining portion of Holy Trinity Church is the west tower, dated to the middle of the 11th century; this is built in three stages, primarily from reused Roman bricks (spolia), and has a pyramidal tiled roof. Of particular note is the unique pointed Saxon doorway on the west-hand side of the tower.

The original Anglo-Saxon church was likely single-celled, with the nave and chancel in the same space. In the mid 14th century the nave and chancel were rebuilt, and in the late 15th century the south arcade, south porch, and south chapel were built. These additions underwent significant restoration work in 1886.

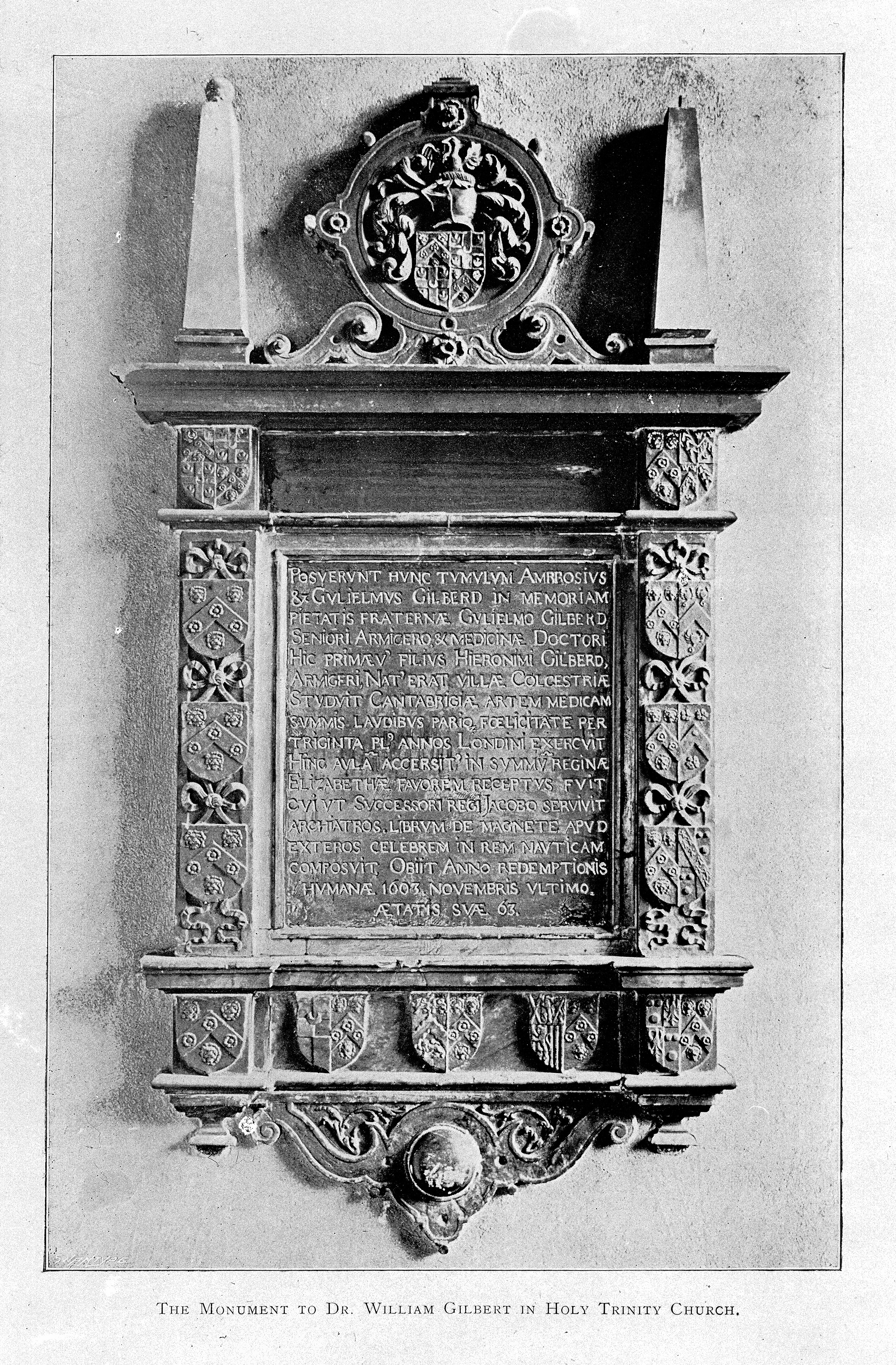
Monument to William Gilbert in Holy Trinity Church

The church contains a mural alabaster monument to William Gilbert.

== History ==
Holy Trinity Church was closed in 1953, and officially made redundant in 1956. It was left vacant until 1972, and during this period, the 17th century church bell was stolen. Work began in 1972 to convert the building to a museum of rural history, opening in 1974. The museum closed in 1997, and the building became closed to public access.

In July 2025, Colchester City Council began work on a regeneration of the building by repairing the roof. In April 2026, work began on Holy Trinity churchyard to restore public access to the space. The project received a major boost with a £2.65 million award from the National Lottery Heritage Fund, forming part of a multi-million-pound refurbishment aimed at reopening the building by 2028. This includes plans for a glass mezzanine floor to provide increased floorspace, and for the creation of a community hub and events venue within the building.

== Notable burials ==
- Physicist William Gilbert, d. 1603
- Composer John Wilbye, d. 1638
- Mary Darcy, Lady Darcy of Chiche, d. 1644 – a pyramidal monument was once in the churchyard, but was removed by 1748
- Politician Sir John Shaw, d. 1690
- Sir Richard Bacon, 8th Baronet of Mildenhall, d. 1773
