= Alexander Learmonth (politician) =

British army officer and Conservative Party politician

Alexander Learmonth MP
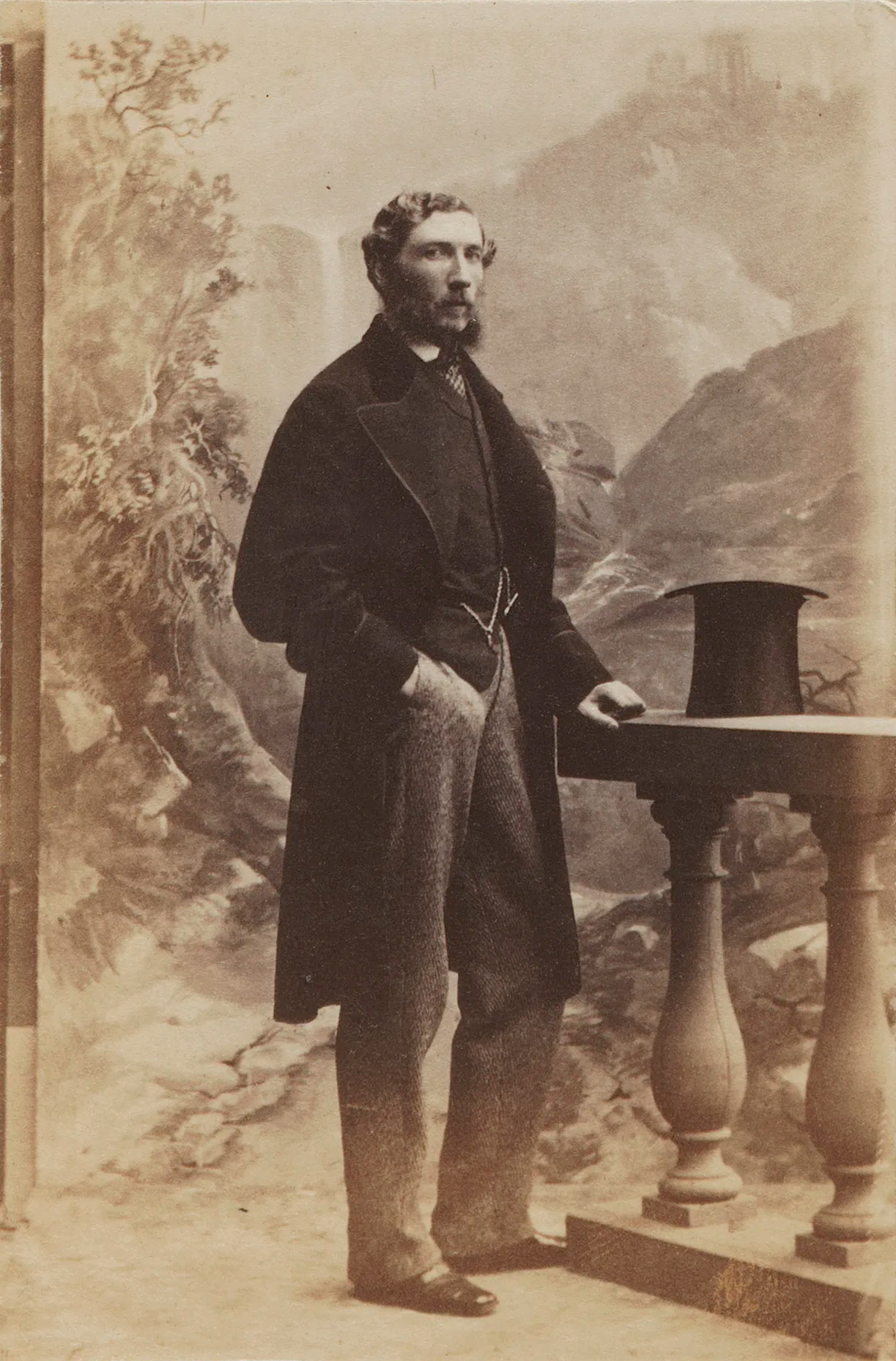
- Portrait by Camille Silvy, 1860

Member of Parliament for Colchester
- In office 3 November 1870 – 31 March 1880 Serving with William Brewer (until 1874); Herbert Mackworth-Praed (from 1874)
- Preceded by: John Gurdon Rebow
- Succeeded by: Richard Causton; William Willis

Personal details
- Born: 1829 Edinburgh, Scotland
- Died: 10 March 1887 (aged 57–58) London, England
- Party: Conservative
- Spouse: Charlotte Lyons (m. 1859)
- Children: Seven

Lt. Col. Alexander Learmonth (1829 – 10 March 1887) was a British Army officer and a Conservative Party politician.

== Life ==
Born at 4 Princes Street in Edinburgh, the eldest son of John Learmonth, Alexander Learmonth was educated at University College, Oxford, where he matriculated in 1847 before entering the Inner Temple to study law. He joined the Army and became a Colonel in the 17th Lancers.

On retiring from the Army he was elected Conservative MP for Colchester on 3 November 1870, sitting from 1870 to 1880.

In 1859, he married Charlotte Lyons, the eldest daughter of Lieutenant-General Humphrey Lyons. The couple had 7 children.

By 1887, his extravagant London lifestyle caused his bankruptcy and the lands he had inherited in Edinburgh from his father were sold to the builder James Steel.

Learmonth died in London on 10 March 1887.

Parliament of the United Kingdom
Preceded by John Gurdon Rebow; William Brewer	Member of Parliament for Colchester; 1870–1880; With: William Brewer (until 1874); Herbert Mackworth-Praed (from 1874)	Succeeded by Richard Causton and William Willis
