= Roger Alford =

16th-century English politician

Roger Alford (died 1580) was an English landowner and politician who was secretary to Sir William Cecil and sat in the House of Commons in 1557 and 1559.

Alford was the eldest son of Robert Alford and Anne Brydges. In about 1549, he entered into political life as secretary to Sir William Cecil, afterwards Lord Burleigh, who was made Secretary of State by Queen Elizabeth immediately after her accession in 1558. He was employed as a Teller of the Receipt of the Exchequer in 1553.

In 1557, Alford was elected Member of Parliament for Bletchingley. He was elected MP for Preston in 1559.

Alford retired to Hitcham, Buckinghamshire, which had come to him through his marriage. He died there in 1580 and was buried in Hitcham Church. His monumental inscription reads as follows.

Arms:—Gules, six pears, three and three.

"Here lieth buried Roger Alford of London, and late of Hitcham, Esquire, who married Elizabeth Clark, widow, and daughter of Thomas Ramsay, Esquire.

He died the 16th of July, 1580."

The following Latin Verses in memory of Roger Alford were written by William Cager, Student of Christ Church, Oxford.

:"In obitu Rogeri Alfordi

"Rogerus tumulo Alfordus sepelitur in isto:
Quid? tantam cohibet tantula terra virum!
Non jacet hic totus, passim bona fama vagatur
Libers, nec modica contineatur humo.
Altera para meliorque sui jam vivit in astris,
Sic tantum corpus jam brevis urna capit."

In English, this translates to:

:"In the death of Roger Alfordi

"Roger is buried in this tomb Alfordus:
What? Such a small country!
It is not the latter, completely lies, a good report that is spread in all directions
Free will, and not even a little is contained to the ground.
One of her, better prepare for life in the stars,
Only in this way the body in the urn is short now."

Alford married Elizabeth Clarke, widow of John Clarke, of Hitcham, Buckinghamshire and daughter of Thomas Ramsey. He had two surviving children Edward and Anne, who married Sir Edmund Fettiplace, the head of a prominent Berkshire family.
