= Ralph Algar =

Member of the Parliament of England

Ralph Algar was an English politician who was MP for Colchester in October 1383, April 1384, 1385, 1386, and September 1388. He was an alderman, bailiff, and tax collector in Colchester.
