= Miller and Sons (London, Piccadilly) =

Oil lamp manufacturers in London, UK during the 19th century

Miller and Sons were manufacturers of oil lamps with offices at 179 Piccadilly, London. They were registered as "Spermaceti-refiners, Wax Chandlers, Oil-merchants".

== History ==
The company of Miller and Sons, based at 179 Picadilly was founded prior to 1835, possibly in the 1820s as a successor to F Glossop. George Alexander Miller who was involved in the business was awarded patent 6551 in 1834 for an improved arrangement of wicks in an Argand lamp. His brother, Taverner John Miller, a ship-owner and sperm oil refiner and merchant operated 'Messr T J Miller & Son' from a wharf on the Thames.

Both companies exhibited at The Great Exhibition of 1851 George Alexander Miller purchased the adjoining 178 Piccadilly in 1857. Horatio William Miller, who was associated with the business died in 1900 and the company moved from 179 Piccadilly in 1907–8. Their father, Charles Taverner Miller (1773–1830), a wax chandler from Middlesex was awarded patent 5896 in February 1830 for certain improvements in the making and manufacturing of candles. and has a memorial in St James's Church, Piccadilly

A pair of lamps made by Miller and Sons from 1835 were sold in 2007 in New York by Christie's for $10,000, and another pair from 1840 fetched $8,800 in 2000. A pair of their lamps are fitted to a horse-drawn fire engine from 1862 which is displayed in the Museum of London.

== Messr T J Miller & Son ==
Taverner John Miller, son of Charles Taverner Miller and brother to George Alexander Miller was a "ship-owner and sperm oil refiner and merchant" and ran a 'Sperm Oil merchants and Spermaceti refiners' business called 'Messr T J Miller & Son' from Dorset Wharf on the River Thames close to the Palace of Westminster. The business was continued by George Taverner Miller (1839–1917) until 1906 when the Wharf was compulsorily purchased by London County Council for £68,000 (£7.15 million as of 2025) to extend Victoria Tower Gardens.
