= William Willis (British politician) =

English barrister, judge and politician

William Willis (29 April 1835 – 22 August 1911) was an English barrister, judge, and Liberal Party politician. He sat in the House of Commons from 1880 to 1885.

== Life ==
Born 29 April 1835 in Dunstable, Bedfordshire, he was the son of William Willis, a straw hat manufacturer of Luton and Esther Kentish Masters of London. He was educated at Huddersfield College and at the University of London. He was called to the bar at the Inner Temple in 1861 and went on the south-eastern circuit. In 1877 he became a QC. Willis visited Japan in the late 19th century.

He married firstly Annie Outhwaite, daughter of John Outhwaite and Elizabeth Collins, with whom he had six daughters and four sons. Following Annie's death around 1894, he married Marie Elizabeth Moody on 2 September 1897, with whom he had one son, Arthur Thomas Willis.

At the 1880 general election Willis was elected Member of Parliament (MP) for Colchester. He held the seat until 1885.

Willis died on 22 August 1911 at the age of 76.

Parliament of the United Kingdom
Preceded by Alexander Learmonth; Herbert Mackworth-Praed	Member of Parliament for Colchester; 1880–1885; With: Richard Knight Causton	Succeeded by Henry John Trotter
