= Edward Alford (Colchester MP) =

English politician

Edward Alford (c. 1566 – c. 1632) was an English landowner and politician who sat in seven parliaments in the House of Commons between 1604 and 1628.

== Background and early life ==
Alford was the son of Roger Alford of London and Hitcham and his wife Elizabeth Ramsay. He matriculated at Trinity College, Oxford on 10 April 1581 aged 15. In accordance with the instructions of his father's will, he studied for the law and entered at Lincoln's Inn.

== Political career ==
In 1593 Alford was elected Member of Parliament for Beverley and in 1604, elected for Colchester. He was re-elected MP for Colchester in 1614 and 1621. On 27 November 1621 he is recorded "Mr Alford saith that since the Powder Treason the Papists say there hath been no practice against the King; and he wisheth that now, on our loose with Spain, those who are about the King should look well that he be not endangered." He applauded Coke's attack on the monopolies and asked for freedom of speech. He was re-elected MP for Colchester in 1624. In 1625 he was appointed High Sheriff of Surrey and Sussex "to prevent his appearance in Parliament".

In 1626, Alford was re-elected for Colchester when "Great was the joy in the House" and he said "This, this is the first Parliament that ever I saw Councillors of State have such care for the State". However it is recorded that "Charles, appealling to the people for a free gift, purified the Commission of the Peace by the dismissal of those persons who were likely to oppose the measure. Elliot and Phelips, Seymour and Alford, ceased to bear the honours of Justice of the Peace in their respective Counties." Alford was re-elected MP for Colchester in 1628, but was replaced on petition by Sir William Masham, 1st Baronet. In 1628 Edward Alford was elected MP for Steyning but it is not clear if this refers to Alford or his son. On 8 May 1628, the House drew up "The Petition of Rights" and sent it to the Upper House for its assent. When the amended bill was returned to the commons on 17 May Alford said "Let us look into the Records and see what they are: what is Sovereign Power? Bodin saith that it is free from any conditions. By this we shall acknowledge a regal, as well as a legal, power. Let us give that to the King the Law gives him, and no more. On 21 June 1628 when thanks were expressed to the Lords for passing the bill, Alford stood up and said this custom of giving thanks had been omitted ever since the passing of a Bill for the old Lord Burghley, and he held it due to the House, for what have these Lords so deserved of the Commonwealth that we should intermit the public affairs of the State to intend their private Bills". Alford subsequently retired to the mansion and estate of Offington, in the parish of Broadwater, West Sussex.

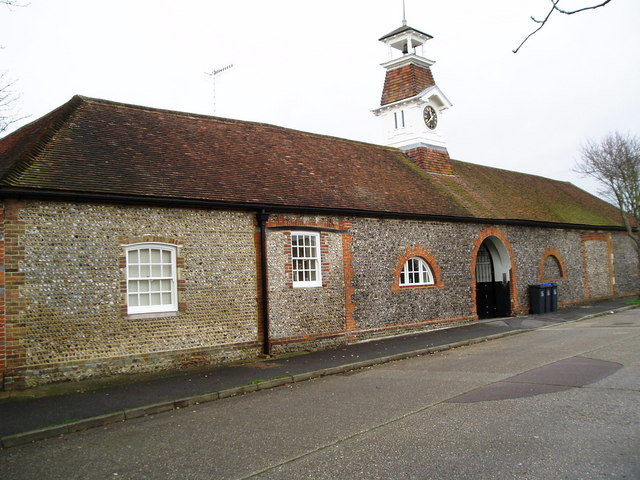
Stable Mews, one of the remaining parts of Offington

Alford was buried in the Chancel of Hamsey Church, near Lewes, Sussex.

== Family ==
Alford married Judith Downing, daughter of Edmund Downing of Suffolk, and had six sons of whom John Alford, Henry and Edward were all members of parliament.

== Notes ==
Parliament of England
Preceded by Robert Barker; Richard Symnell	Member of Parliament for Colchester; 1604–1624; With: Robert Barker 1604–1614; William Towse 1621– 1624	Succeeded by William Towse; Sir Robert Quarles
Preceded by William Towse; Sir Robert Quarles	Member of Parliament for Colchester; 1626–1628; With: William Towse 1626; Sir Thomas Cheek 1628	Succeeded by Sir Thomas Cheek; Sir William Masham, 1st Baronet
