= William Towse =

English lawyer and politician (ca. 1551–1634)

William Towse (ca. 1551 – 22 October 1634) was an English lawyer and politician who sat in the House of Commons at various times between 1586 and 1626.

Towse was from Henham, Essex. He was admitted at Inner Temple in 1571 and was called to the bar. He lived in the Inner Temple until 1614 and audited the steward's accounts and the treasurer's accounts five times between 1583 and 1600 and served on several committees investigating matters of concern to the inn. In 1586, he was elected Member of Parliament for Bramber. He was a J.P. for Essex from about 1592. In 1595, he became bencher of Inner Temple and in 1597 was summer reader. He was treasurer of the Inn in 1607 and was Lent reader in 1610. In 1614, he became serjeant-at-law and was elected MP for Beverley. He was town clerk of Colchester by 1620 and in his later years lived at Takeley, Essex. In 1621, he was elected MP for Colchester. He was re-elected MP for Colchester in 1624, 1625 and 1626.

Towse died at the age of about 83.

Towse married Jean French and had a son and three daughters.

Parliament of England
Preceded by Nicholas Beaumont; Sampson Lennard	Member of Parliament for Bramber; 1586; With: John Porter	Succeeded by James Altham; John Osborne
Preceded by William Gee; Allan Percy	Member of Parliament for Beverley; 1614; With: Edmund Scott	Succeeded by Edmund Scott; Sir Christopher Hilliard
Preceded by Robert Barker; Edward Alford	Member of Parliament for Colchester; 1621–1626; With: Edward Alford 1621–1624; Sir Robert Quarles 1625; Edward Alford 1626	Succeeded by Edward Alford; Sir Thomas Cheek
