= William Warwick Hawkins =

British politician

Member of Parliament for Colchester
- In office 10 July 1852 – 28 March 1857 Serving with John Gurdon Rebow (Feb 1857–Mar 1857); John Manners (1852–Feb 1857)
- Preceded by: John Manners; Joseph Harcastle
- Succeeded by: John Gurdon Rebow; Taverner John Miller

Personal details
- Born: 1816
- Died: 8 February 1868 (aged 51)
- Party: Conservative

William Warwick Hawkins (1816 – 8 February 1868) was a British Conservative politician.

Hawkins was elected Conservative MP for Colchester at the 1852 general election and held the seat until 1857 when he did not seek re-election.

Parliament of the United Kingdom
Preceded by John Manners; Joseph Harcastle	Member of Parliament for Colchester; 1852–1857; With: John Gurdon Rebow (Feb 1857–Mar 1857); John Manners (1852–Feb 1857)	Succeeded by John Gurdon Rebow; Taverner John Miller
