= St Pancras South East =

Parliamentary constituency in the United Kingdom, 1918–1950

- Former borough constituency for the House of Commons

1918–1950
- Created from: St Pancras South and St Pancras East
- Replaced by: Holborn and St Pancras South and St Pancras North

St. Pancras South East was a borough constituency represented in the House of Commons of the Parliament of the United Kingdom. It elected one Member of Parliament (MP) by the first past the post system of election. It was created in 1918 by the division of St Pancras South into South East and South West divisions, and abolished in 1950.

== Boundaries ==
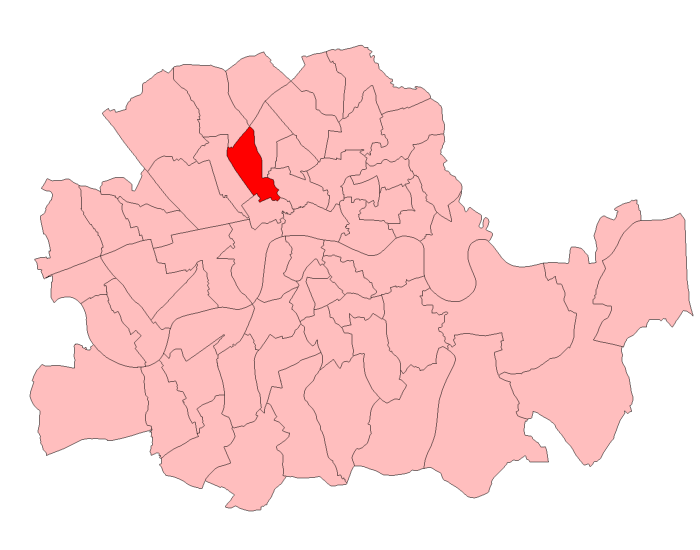
St Pancras South East in London 1918-50

1918–1950: The Metropolitan Borough of St Pancras wards of six and eight, and the part of ward number three lying to the south and east of a line running along the middle of Camden Road from a point where that road is intersected by the eastern boundary of the metropolitan borough to the point where that road crosses the Regent's Canal and thence westward along the middle of that canal to the western boundary of Ward number three.

In 1950 the constituency was split between Holborn and St Pancras South (wards Six and Eight) and St Pancras North (ward Three).

== Members of Parliament ==
Election	Member	Party
1918	John Hopkins	Unionist
1923	Herbert Romeril	Labour
1924	John Hopkins	Unionist
1929	Herbert Romeril	Labour
1931	Sir Alfred Beit	Conservative
1945	Santo Jeger	Labour
1950	constituency abolished	

=== Elections in the 1910s ===
General election 1918: St Pancras South-East
Party	Candidate	Votes	%	±%
Unionist	John Hopkins	4,884	37.8	
Liberal	Richard Reiss	3,594	27.8	
Independent	Percy Adams*	2,263	17.5	
Labour	Herbert Romeril	2,189	16.9	
Majority		1,290	10.0	
Turnout		12,930	47.2	
Unionist win (new seat)				

* Some records describe Adams as an Independent, while others state that Adams, Hopkins and Reiss all supported the Coalition Government. One states that Coalition Government endorsement was initially issued to Reiss but subsequently withdrawn.

However, Craig records that Adams initially received the coupon with Liberal endorsement, and this was later withdrawn, with Craig claiming to be free of any party allegiance and previously having been outspokenly against the coalition.

=== Elections in the 1920s ===
General election 1922: St Pancras South-East
Party	Candidate	Votes	%	±%
Unionist	John Hopkins	8,753	47.5	+9.7
Labour	Herbert Romeril	5,609	30.5	+13.6
Liberal	Leonard Franklin	4,053	22.0	−5.8
Majority		3,144	17.0	+7.0
Turnout		18,415	60.1	+12.9
Unionist hold		Swing		

General election 1923: St Pancras South East
Party	Candidate	Votes	%	±%
Labour	Herbert Romeril	7,866	41.6	+11.1
Unionist	John Hopkins	7,174	37.9	−9.6
Liberal	George Swaffield	3,890	20.5	−1.5
Majority		692	3.7	N/A
Turnout		18,950		
Labour gain from Unionist		Swing	+10.3	

General election 1924: St Pancras South-East
Party	Candidate	Votes	%	±%
Unionist	John Hopkins	12,538	54.5	+16.6
Labour	Herbert Romeril	10,463	45.5	+3.9
Majority		2,075	9.0	+5.3
Turnout		23,001	72.6	
Unionist hold		Swing		

General election 1929: St Pancras South East
Party	Candidate	Votes	%	±%
Labour	Herbert Romeril	13,173	47.9	+2.4
Unionist	Alfred Beit	10,543	38.3	−16.2
Liberal	Elizabeth Edwardes	3,798	13.8	New
Majority		2,630	9.6	N/A
Turnout		30,144	66.8	−5.8
Labour gain from Unionist		Swing	+9.3	

=== Elections in the 1930s ===
General election 1931: St Pancras South East
Party	Candidate	Votes	%	±%
Conservative	Alfred Beit	18,064	66.7	+28.4
Labour	Herbert Romeril	8,684	32.1	−15.8
Communist	Shaukat Usmani	332	1.2	New
Majority		9,380	34.6	N/A
Turnout		27.080	65.5	−1.3
Conservative gain from Labour		Swing		

General election 1935: St Pancras South East
Party	Candidate	Votes	%	±%
Conservative	Alfred Beit	11,976	51.0	−15.7
Labour	Santo Jeger	10,340	44.0	+11.9
Liberal	Laurence George Bowman	1,181	5.0	New
Majority		1,636	7.0	−27.6
Turnout		23,497	60.4	−5.1
Conservative hold		Swing		

=== Elections in the 1940s ===
General election 1945: St Pancras South East
Party	Candidate	Votes	%	±%
Labour	Santo Jeger	10,030	59.6	+15.6
Conservative	Alfred Beit	5,320	31.6	−19.4
Liberal	Audrey Blackman	1,474	8.8	+3.8
Majority		4,710	28.0	N/A
Turnout		16,824	64.3	+3.9
Labour gain from Conservative		Swing		
