= John Christian (English politician) =

English politician

John Christian (died 1396/7) was an English politician who served as MP for Colchester in October 1382, November 1384, 1391, 1393 and 1395.
