= Thomas Francis (politician) =

MP for Colchester

Member of Parliament for Colchester
- In office 1372 – May 1413

Personal details
- Died: 1416/17
- Spouse: Agnes
- Children: 2
- Parents: Robert Francis (father); Margery (mother)

Thomas Francis was an English politician who served as MP for Colchester 14 times over a period lasting 45 years.
