= Bulkley Praed =

English cricketer

Personal information
- Full name: Bulkley John Mackworth Praed
- Born: 2 August 1799; Devon, England
- Died: 12 March 1876 (aged 76); Ousden Hall, Suffolk

Bulkley John Mackworth Praed (2 August 1799 – 12 March 1876) was an English cricketer who is recorded in one match in 1822, totalling 2 runs with a highest score of 1 not out. He was educated at St John's College, Cambridge.

Mackworth-Praed was married three times:

- On 22 December 1828 to Emma Dick (d. 3 August 1836)
- On 14 July 1840 to Elizabeth Colthurst FitzPatrick (d. 6 February 1852), with whom he fathered Herbert Mackworth-Praed.
- On 26 April 1859 to Emily Maria Fane (d. 11 May 1905)

His brother was the poet Winthrop Mackworth Praed.

== Bibliography ==
- Haygarth, Arthur (1862). Scores & Biographies, Volume 1 (1744–1826). Lillywhite.
