= John Lucas (MP for Colchester) =

16th-century English politician

John Lucas (by 1512 – 13 September 1556), of Inner Temple, London, and Colchester, Essex, was an English member of parliament.

He was a younger son of Thomas Lucas of Little Saxham Hall, Suffolk and entered the Inner Temple in July 1526 to study law.

He was a justice of the peace for Essex from 1538 until his death and Town Clerk of Colchester from 1543 to 1548 and from 1550 to his death. He was elected a member of parliament (MP) for Colchester in 1545, 1547 and 1553. He was a Master of Requests from 1552 to 1553.

He married twice: firstly Mary, the daughter of John Abell of Essex, who delivered him 2 sons and secondly Elizabeth, the daughter of John Christmas of Colchester, who delivered 1 son and 2 daughters. He was succeeded by his eldest son Thomas.
