= Arthur Horne Goldfinch =

British politician

Sir Arthur Horne Goldfinch, KBE (10 May 1866 – 9 November 1945), was a British businessman and Liberal Party politician.

== Background ==
Goldfinch was born in Valparaíso, Chile. He was unmarried. He was knighted in 1918.

== Professional career ==
Goldfinch entered the service of Duncan, Fox & Co., General Merchants, Valparaíso, in 1881. He became a partner of that firm (Liverpool, London, Chile, and Peru) in 1903. He retired from business in 1913. He was Director of Raw Materials at the War Office from 1917–21. He was Chairman of the London Board of British-Australian Wool Realisation Association from 1921–26.

== Political career ==
Goldfinch was prospective Liberal candidate for Colchester division of Essex from 1914–18. Colchester was a Unionist seat that had been won by a Liberal in 1895, 1900 and 1906. He was selected in June 1914 to run in a General Election expected to take place in 1915. The outbreak of war postponed the election but he remained as prospective candidate until 1918. He did not contest the 1918 General Election when endorsement from the Coalition Government went to his Unionist opponent. Neither did he run at the 1922 General Election when there was again no Liberal candidate in Colchester. He finally ran as Liberal candidate for Colchester at the 1923 General Election. However, by then, the Labour Party had entrenched itself as the main challenger and he finished third. He did not stand for parliament again.

=== Electoral record ===
General Election 1923: Colchester
Party	Candidate	Votes	%	±%
Unionist	Laming Worthington-Evans	10,535	43.4	−13.3
Labour	Richard Reiss	8,316	34.2	−9.1
Liberal	Arthur Horne Goldfinch	5,430	22.4	n/a
Majority		2,219	9.2	−4.2
Turnout			78.2	
Unionist hold		Swing	-2.1	
