= Robert Quarles =

English politician

Sir Robert Quarles (1581–1639) was an English politician who sat in the House of Commons in 1625.

Quarles was the son of James Quarles(d. 1599) of Stewards, Romford, Essex and his second wife Joan Dalton. He was admitted at Emmanuel College, Cambridge on 15 November 1599 and was admitted at Lincoln's Inn on 25 October 1600. He was knighted at Newmarket on 5 March 1608. In 1625, he was elected member of parliament for Colchester.

Quarles died in 1639 and was buried at Romford on 2 February 1639.

Quarles married firstly, in 1601 to Hester Lewknor (d 1612), by whom he had four sons and two daughters. She was the daughter of Edward Lewknor (d 1605). Quarles married secondly in 1614, Anne Brewster by whom one daughter. Thirdly in 1617, Mary Parvish, by whom two sons and one daughter.

Parliament of England
Preceded by Edward Alford; William Towse	Member of Parliament for Colchester; 1625; With: William Towse	Succeeded by Edward Alford; William Towse
