= Philip Oxenden Papillon =

British politician

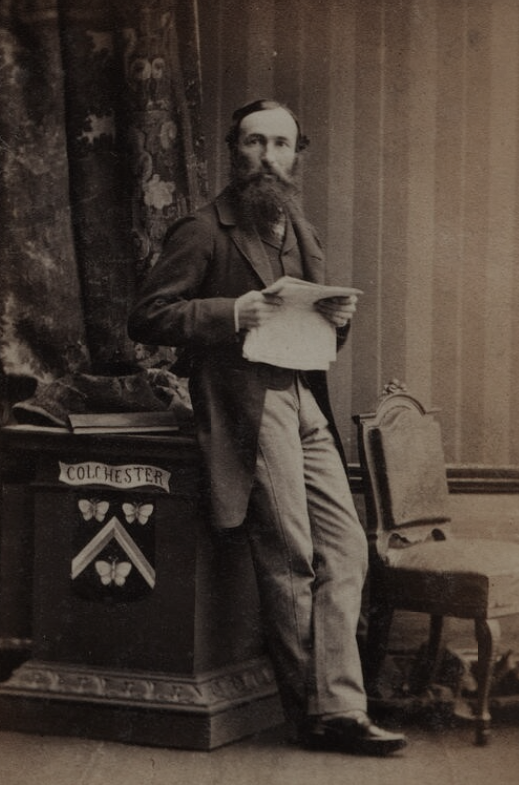
- Philip Oxenden Papillon, 1861 photograph

Member of Parliament for Colchester
- In office 30 April 1859 – 13 July 1865 Serving with Taverner John Miller
- Preceded by: John Gurdon Rebow; Taverner John Miller
- Succeeded by: John Gurdon Rebow; Taverner John Miller

Personal details
- Born: 1 August 1826
- Died: 16 August 1899 (aged 73)
- Party: Conservative
- Relatives: Sir Percy Dixwell-Oxenden, 10th Baronet (cousin)

Philip Oxenden Papillon (1 August 1826 – 16 August 1899) was a British Conservative politician.

== Life ==
He was the son of Thomas Papillon of Acrise and his wife Frances Mary Oxenden, daughter of Sir Henry Oxenden, 7th Baronet. He was educated at Rugby School from 1841, and matriculated at University College, Oxford in 1844, graduating B.A. in 1848 and M.A. in 1851. He was called to the bar at the Inner Temple in 1852.

Papillon was elected Conservative MP for Colchester at the 1859 general election and held the seat until 1865 when he stood for re-election but was defeated.

== Family ==
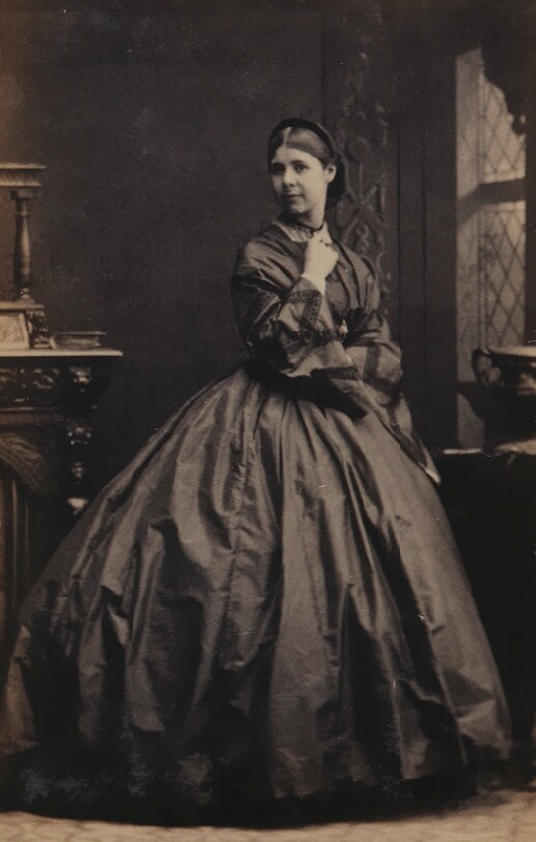
Emily Caroline Garnier, 1862 photograph

Papillon married in 1862 Emily Caroline Garnier, third daughter of Thomas Garnier.

Parliament of the United Kingdom
Preceded by John Gurdon Rebow; Taverner John Miller	Member of Parliament for Colchester; 1859–1865; With: Taverner John Miller	Succeeded by John Gurdon Rebow; Taverner John Miller
