= Taverner John Miller =

English businessman and politician

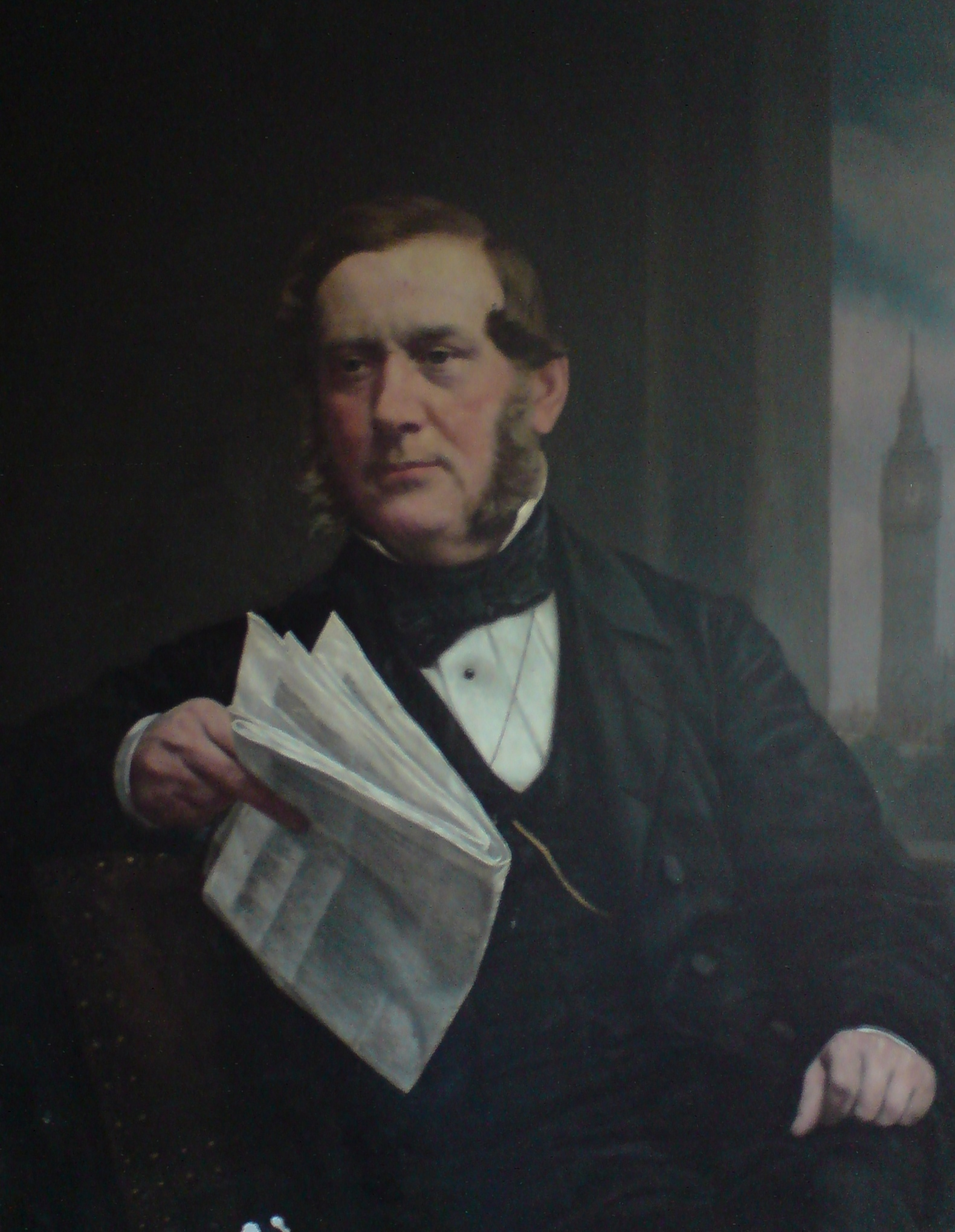

Taverner John Miller (1804 – 27 March 1867) was an English businessman and Conservative Party politician. He was the owner of a whaling business based in Westminster, London and held a seat in the House of Commons from 1852 to 1853, and from 1857 to 1867.

== Biography ==
Miller lived at 1 Millbank, London and was a "ship-owner and sperm-oil refiner and merchant". He ran a 'Sperm Oil merchants and Spermaceti refiners' business called 'Messr T J Miller & Son' from Dorset Wharf, on the site of the current Victoria Tower Gardens by the Houses of Parliament and exhibited at the Great Exhibition of 1851.

Miller was elected as MP for Maldon in the 1852 general election. However an election petition and an investigation into corrupt practices in the borough (in which he was not implicated) led to the election being declared void on 18 March 1853; the writ was suspended and the by-election was not held until August 1854. In February 1857 he stood unsuccessfully at a by-election in Colchester, but won the seat at the general election in March 1857 and held it until his resignation on 5 February 1867 by taking the post of Steward of the Manor of Northstead. He married Marian Cheyne in 1838 and was a Church Warden of St Johns Westminster in 1855. In 1831 he appeared as primary prosecution witness at the trial of a 19-year-old George Fox at the Old Bailey where Fox was convicted for pickpocketing Miller's silk handkerchief and was sentenced to be transported for fourteen years.

His brother, George Alexander Miller, an "oilman and wax chandler" founded Miller and Sons which had premises at 179 Piccadilly. Their father, Charles Taverner Miller (1773–1830) was a wax chandler from Middlesex who has a patent (5896) in his name for an improved method of making candles in 1830 His whaling business was continued by his son, George Taverner Miller (1839–1917) until Dorset Wharf was compulsorily purchased for £68,000 (£9.24 million as of 2023) in 1906 by London County Council to extend Victoria Tower Gardens.

Parliament of the United Kingdom
| Preceded by David Waddington; Thomas Barrett Lennard | Member of Parliament for Maldon; 1852–1853; With: Charles du Cane | Succeeded by George Peacocke; John Bramley-Moore |
| Preceded by William Warwick Hawkins; John Gurdon Rebow | Member of Parliament for Colchester; 1857–1867; With: John Gurdon Rebow to 1859; Philip Papillon 1859–1865; John Gurdon Rebow from 1865 | Succeeded by Edward Karslake; John Gurdon Rebow |
