= Herbert Mackworth-Praed =

British landowner, magistrate, banker and politician

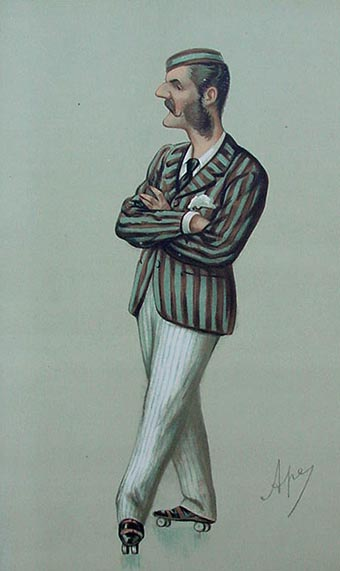
Vanity Fair caricature of Mackworth-Praed by Ape

Sir Herbert Bulkley Mackworth-Praed, 1st Baronet DL JP (2 May 1841 – 21 November 1921), was a British landowner, magistrate, banker, benefactor and Conservative politician.

== Biography ==
Mackworth-Praed was the second son of Bulkley John Mackworth-Praed, JP, of Owsden Hall, Suffolk, by his second wife Elizabeth FitzPatrick, eldest daughter of Patrick Persse FitzPatrick. His uncle was the poet Winthrop Mackworth Praed.

He was educated at Harrow. He was returned to Parliament for Colchester in 1874, a seat he held until 1880. He was also a Deputy Lieutenant and Justice of the Peace for Suffolk and served as High Sheriff of Suffolk in 1886. On 28 December 1905 he was created a baronet, of Owsden Hall in the Parish of Owsden and County of Suffolk. The following year he was given Royal licence to continue the use of the surname Praed in addition to that of Mackworth.

Escutcheon of the Mackworth-Praed baronets of Owsden Hall

Mackworth-Praed died in November 1921, aged 80, and the baronetcy became extinct.

Parliament of the United Kingdom
Preceded by William Brewer; Alexander Learmonth	Member of Parliament for Colchester; 1874–1880; With: Alexander Learmonth	Succeeded by Richard Causton; William Willis
Baronetage of the United Kingdom
New creation	Baronet (of Owsden Hall); 1905–1921	Extinct
Preceded by Ley baronets	Mackworth-Praed baronets of Owsden Hall; 28 December 1905	Succeeded by Mann baronets
