= Tom Lucas (trade unionist) =

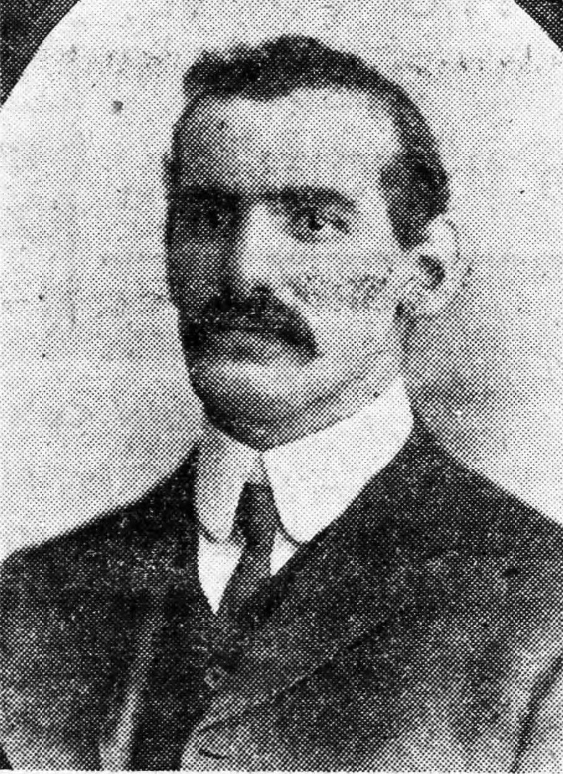
Lucas in 1914

Thomas Lucas (1876 – after 1936) was a Welsh trade union leader.

Born at Aber Farm in Ogmore Vale, Lucas received an elementary education, leaving school at the age of 12. He found work at the Aber Colliery, oiling trams, and gradually worked his way up to become a hewer. In 1898, he was elected as checkweighman.

Lucas was active in the South Wales Miners' Federation (SWMF), and in 1902/03 he served as the union's auditor. In 1903, the union formed a new Ogmore and Gilfach district, and Lucas was elected as its secretary. In 1905, the district's agent, Tom Davies, died, and Lucas became acting agent. The following year, he was elected to the post on a permanent basis, defeating D. J. Thomas by 1,693 votes to 460, and he also won election to the SWMF's executive committee.

Lucas was also elected to Ogmore and Garw Urban District Council, replacing Davies, and in 1916 he was elected as chairman of the council. In 1914, he became a magistrate. He served as the district's agent until 1934, when it was merged with the Garw and Maesteg districts, to form Area No.3. Lucas was appointed as joint agent of the new area, and served until at least 1936.

In his spare time, Lucas conducted a choir of the Congregational Church, and wrote hymns.

Trade union offices
New post	Secretary of the Ogmore and Gilfach District of the South Wales Miners' Federation; 1903–1906	Succeeded by David Bonner
Preceded by Tom Davies	Agent of the Ogmore and Gilfach District of the South Wales Miners' Federation; 1906–1933	Position abolished
New post	Agent of the Area No.3 of the South Wales Miners' Federation; 1933–1936? With: Ted Williams	Succeeded by Alf Davies?
