= Ambrose Lowth =

16th-century English politician

Ambrose Lowth (died 1545) was an English politician.

He was a member of parliament (MP) for Colchester in 1523.
