= George Sayer (MP for Colchester) =

English politician

George Sayer (by 1515 – 19 May 1577) was an English politician who sat as MP for Colchester in November 1554.

== Family ==
He was the son of Thomas Sayer. He married Agnes, the daughter of Thomas Wesden by 1540. They had four sons and three daughters. Agnes died in November 1556 and Sayer married Frances, the daughter of Thomas Salmon. Frances died on 29 April 1570.
