= John Kimberley =

English politician

John Kimberley (died 1432?) was an English politician who sat as MP for Colchester in 1420 and May 1421.

He married Alice before August 1423 and married Agnes before October 1426.
