= 1870 Colchester by-election =

UK Parliamentary by-election

The 1870 Colchester by-election was held on 3 November 1870. The by-election was fought due to the death of the incumbent Liberal MP, John Gurdon Rebow.

The Liberal candidate was Sir Henry Storks, a strong supporter of the controversial Contagious Diseases Acts which provided for compulsory inspection and medical treatment of prostitutes in garrison towns, including Colchester. Opponents of the legislation, including Josephine Butler, supported a rival Liberal Baxter Langley, and used the election in their campaign for repeal. Langley withdrew on election day and the Conservative candidate Alexander Learmonth of Edinburgh, gained the seat convincingly. The gain was retained at the subsequent general election.

Colchester by-election, 1870
Party	Candidate	Votes	%	±%
Conservative	Alexander Learmonth	1,377	61.8	
Liberal	Rt Hon. Sir Henry Storks	850	38.2	
Majority		510	23.6	N/A
Turnout		2,227	70.5	−20.2
Conservative gain from Liberal		Swing		
