= William Cardinall (MP for Dartmouth) =

English politician (born c. 1535)

William Cardinall II (c. 1535 – c. 1598) was an English politician and lawyer who sat as MP for Dartmouth in 1572.

He was the first son of William Cardinall and his first wife, Joan (nee Gurdon). He married Mary (nee Wentworth) and had 1 daughter, Anne. He later married his second wife, Julian.

He was educated at St. John's College, Cambridge and was admitted to Gray's Inn in 1553 and called to the bar in 1555.
