= Thomas Godstone =

English politician

Thomas Godstone (died 1432) was an English politician who sat as MP for Colchester in 1399, 1402, 1407, 1411, May 1413, November 1414, 1417, 1419, 1420, May 1421, December 1421, 1422 and 1427.

He was the brother of John Godstone. He married Christine before April 1398 and had one son and one daughter. Christine died in 1425.

== Biography ==
Originating from a Surrey gentry family, he expanded his influence through royal service, property acquisition, and marriage into a wealthy Colchester family. Under Richard II, Godstone held several significant offices, including high bailiff of Guînes, victualler of its castle, collector of customs at Ipswich, and alnager of Essex and Hertfordshire. His royal service continued under Henry IV and Henry V, despite the loss of the farm of Greenwich priory. He served repeatedly as bailiff of Colchester (13 terms), represented the borough at the Exchequer, and was deeply involved in local governance and parliamentary affairs.

In 1401, Godstone was implicated in a customs fraud conspiracy at Ipswich. Though fined and dismissed from customs office, he repaid the embezzled funds quickly and retained royal favor, including his Guînes bailiwick. He was later arrested twice on suspicion of conspiracy and local disputes but was never convicted. He also played a role in enforcing anti-Lollard measures by confiscating religious texts.

Godstone was connected socially and politically, acting frequently as a witness, trustee, surety, and executor for leading figures, and participating in parliamentary elections. In later life, he focused more on trade, securing licences to export grain and wool, transport pilgrims, and serve on a commission to impress mariners for royal naval defense.

His wealth derived largely from extensive property holdings in Colchester and elsewhere in Essex, including mills, manors, and urban tenements. His wife Christine, who owned substantial property, died by 1425 and left him much of her estate. Their two children predeceased him, and upon Godstone’s death shortly before May 1432, his lands passed to his brother John, who had to secure them through Chancery litigation.
