= Herbert Romeril =

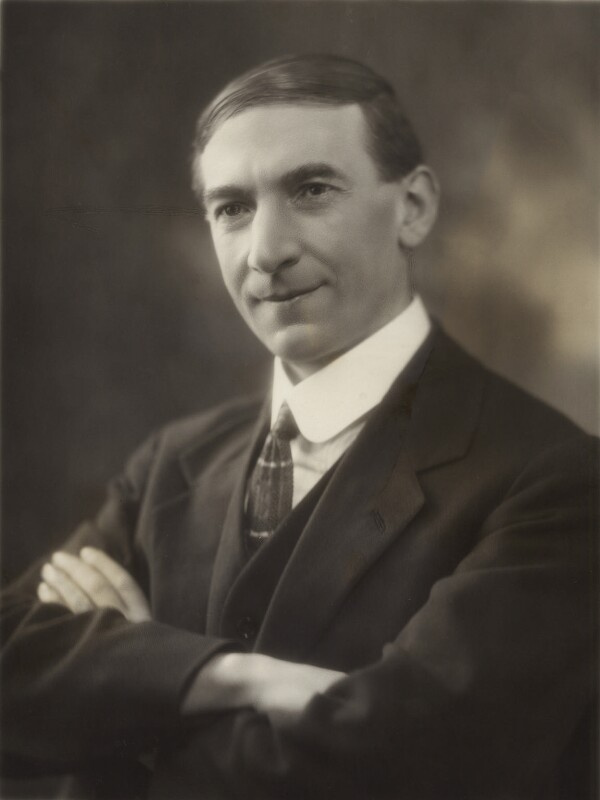
Romeril in 1924

Herbert George Romeril (1881 – 2 October 1963) was an English Labour Party politician.

Romeril worked at the Railway Clearing House, and joined the Railway Clerks' Association. He also joined the Independent Labour Party (ILP), and became the chair of its Metropolitan Branch.

The ILP was affiliated to the Labour Party, and at the 1918 and 1922 UK general elections, Romeril stood unsuccessfully for it in St Pancras South East. He finally won the seat in 1923, lost it in 1924, won it again in 1929, and then lost again in 1931. From 1930 to 1931, he chaired the Estimates Committee in Parliament.

At the 1935 UK general election, Romeril stood unsuccessfully in Battersea South. He did not stand for Parliament again, but did serve as a magistrate for Middlesex.

Parliament of the United Kingdom
Preceded by John Hopkins	Member of Parliament for St Pancras South East; 1923 – 1924	Succeeded by John Hopkins
Preceded by John Hopkins	Member of Parliament for St Pancras South East; 1929 – 1931	Succeeded by Sir Alfred Beit, Bt
Trade union offices
Preceded by George Lathan	President of the Railway Clerks' Association; 1912 – 1916	Succeeded by W. E. Williams
