= Thomas Lucas (MP for Colchester) =

English politician (born 1530/31)

Sir Thomas Lucas (1530/31 – August or September 1611) was an English politician and lawyer who sat as MP for Colchester in 1558.

He was the first son of John Lucas and his first wife Mary (nee Abell). He was educated at Trinity College, Cambridge and matriculated in 1549. He was admitted into the Inner Temple in 1550 but was expelled and imprisoned due to his temper, though he was later reinstated as a bencher. He married Mary, the daughter of Sir John Fermor and they had two sons, three daughters and two other children. He was knighted in September 1571.

He inherited a large estate upon his father's death on 13 September 1556, including St. John's Abbey. Despite being considered sympathetic to religious reform, his turbulent behavior prevented further parliamentary service. Throughout his life he was involved in disputes, legal conflicts, and occasional imprisonment, though he also earned praise for his military conduct in 1596. His longstanding feud with his brother Robert resulted in court battles, ending with Robert owing him damages.

Lucas died in 1611. His eldest son had previously killed Sir William Brooke (alias Cobham), causing Lucas to temporarily transfer his lands to protect them from forfeiture; after the son’s pardon, the property was restored. In his will, Lucas provided for his wife and children, and passed down a silk needlework bed with instructions that it remain in the family.
