= William Cardinall (MP for Colchester) =

English politician (born 1509/1510)

William Cardinall (1509/10 – 7 or 8 August 1568) was an English politician who sat as MP for Colchester in April 1554, 1559 and 1563.

He was the first son of William Cardinall. He married Joan (nee Gurdon) in 1535 and had 1 son, William and three daughters. He married his second wife, Lettice (nee Knightley) by June 1556 and they had four or five sons and one daughter.

By 1558, he was receiver-general to the Earl of Oxford.
