= James Morice =

16th-century English politician

James Morice (1539–1597) was an English politician.

== Biography ==
Morice was born in 1539, the eldest son of William Morice of Chipping Ongar and Anne Isaac of Kent. The younger Morice was educated at the Middle Temple.

Morice was Member of Parliament (MP) for Wareham in 1563. Later, he was MP for Colchester, Essex, for the parliaments of 1584, 1586, 1589, and 1593.

Morice married Elizabeth, the daughter of George Medley of Tilty Abbey in Essex; they had four sons and three daughters. His heir was his eldest son, John, who was also an MP.
