= Martin Bessell =

English politician

Martin Bessell (died 1623) was a bailiff and MP for Colchester in 1593.

He married Elizabeth in 1578 and had six sons and seven daughters.

He died in 1623 and was buried in St. Peter's church.
