= Joseph Elianore =

MP for Colchester

Joseph Elianore was bailiff for Colchester and the MP from 1313 till 1339.

He served as bailiff eight times between 1311 and 1342. In 1337, he gave land in Greenstead and Ardleigh to St Botolph's Priory.
