= Sir John Hopkins, 1st Baronet =

Sir John Wells Wainwright Hopkins, 1st Baronet (16 February 1863 – 16 February 1946) was an English civil engineer and a Conservative Party politician. He was the Member of Parliament (MP) for St Pancras South East from 1918 to 1923, and from 1924 to 1929.

Hopkins was born in Islington, London in 1863. He was made a baronet in 1929.

== Family life ==
Hopkins married Ethelind Mackern in 1894, they had two sons and a daughter. Hopkins died 16 February 1946 at his home in Lingfield, Surrey aged 83. Both his sons had been killed in action, in 1916 and 1942, leaving no heir to the title.

Parliament of the United Kingdom
New constituency	Member of Parliament for St Pancras South East; 1918 – 1923	Succeeded by Herbert Romeril
Preceded by Herbert Romeril	Member of Parliament for St Pancras South East; 1924 – 1929	Succeeded by Herbert Romeril
Baronetage of the United Kingdom
New creation	Baronet of (St Pancras); 1929–1946	Extinct
