= Old Heath =

Parish in Essex, England

Coordinates: 51°52′16″N 0°55′34″E

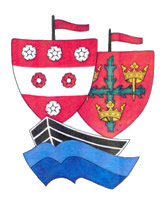
- Old Heath Logo

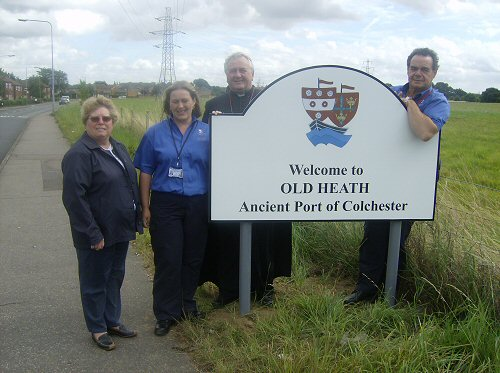
- The welcome to Old Heath sign

- Location within Essex
- Population: 6,181 (Ward 2011)
- Shire county: Essex
- Region: East
- Country: England
- Sovereign state: United Kingdom
- Post town: COLCHESTER
- Postcode district: CO2
- Dialling code: 01206
- Police: Essex
- Fire: Essex
- Ambulance: East of England

Old Heath is a Church of England parish south-east of Colchester, Essex, England.

Old Heath has existed since Saxon times and was originally called 'Old Hythe' because it was the first port of Colchester, before Hythe (called Newehethe in 1311) took over: hythe derives from the Old English word for 'landing place'.

== Logo ==
The logo depicts a ship sailing upon the waves and bears two sails each with a coat of arms. Old Heath is derived from the original Old Hythe or the first Port of Colchester which was located within the parish boundaries of Old Heath. The Port on this location can be traced back to Saxon times. The ship, therefore, represents the fact that Old Heath was the port and still has an active Quayside at King Edward and Haven Quays, both located in the parish. More modern political boundaries have tended to count this part of Old Heath with the part generally known as 'The Hythe' in the Parish of New Town as if they were all part of the same community (which politicians call Harbour) but this is not so and the parish boundaries are clearly marked by our 'Welcome to Old Heath' signs. Old Heath developed as a separate village beyond the boundaries of Colchester. The two sails of the ship carry the Arms of Colchester and St. Barnabas. Colchester's Arms represent the 'True Cross' of Jesus because it is believed that St. Helena (Patron Saint of Colchester) visited Colchester. St. Helena claimed to have discovered the true cross upon which Jesus was crucified when she was visiting the Holy sites in and around Jerusalem. St. Helena was the mother of the Emperor Constantine and Colchester was a Roman City. The forward sail is the Coat of Arms of St. Barnabas who is the Patron Saint of Old Heath. St. Barnabas is known as 'The Son of Consolation' and it may be that he became Patron for Old Heath because we were located in the poor part of what was becoming the big and rich Town of Colchester. St. Barnabas is said to bring comfort and hope to the poor.

This sign appears on all buildings for community use in Old Heath, on the signs welcoming you into the parish from every direction and all on correspondence from the Vicarage and from the Community Task group.

== Churches ==
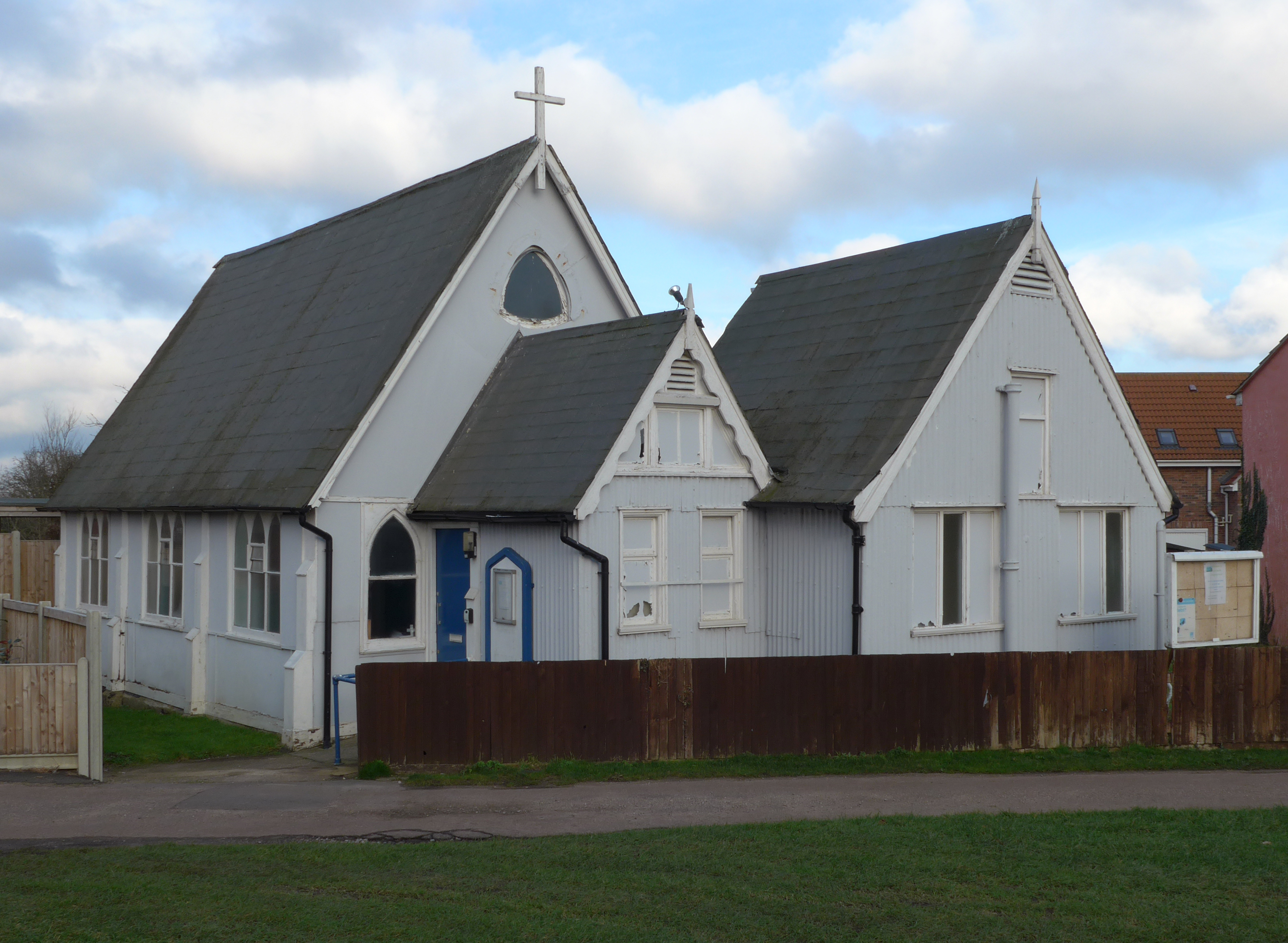
Old Heath Congregational Church (or Chapel).

Old Heath has a parish church (CofE) called St Barnabas's and also had a small Congregational Chapel known as the 'tin tabernacle'.

The original church of St Barnabas was demolished in 1949 after being declared unsafe.

The Congregational Chapel was subject to a planning application for demolition in December 2014, which was refused. See here for more details, and document references about the building. The building, which had been unused since the early 2010s, burned down on 20 May 2025.

== Services ==
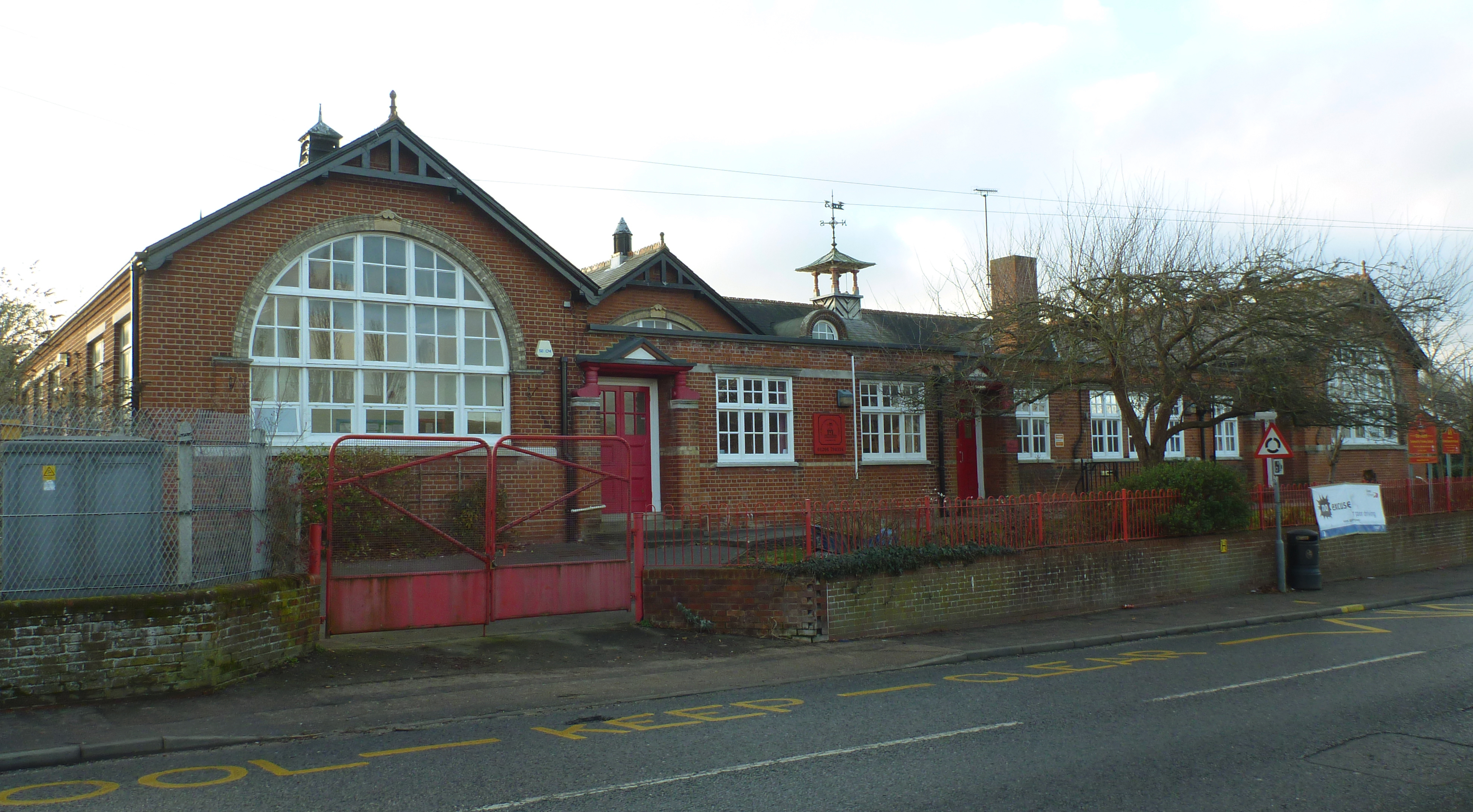
Old Heath Primary School

Old Heath has four regular bus services to and from Colchester town centre, a post office, a local Co-op., a butcher, a baker and a greengrocer. It also has a fish and chip shop to the south of the village, and a small garage.

Old Heath's primary school children are served by Old Heath Primary School which was awarded a 'good' status by OFSTED.

Old Heath is also home to a military firing range, that the public are allowed to access when the red flag is not flying.

=== Representation ===
Old Heath is currently represented by three Labour councillors at a Borough level; Lee Scordis, Adam Fox and Michael Lilley. It is also represented by Lee Scordis at County Council.
