= John Makin (politician) =

16th-century English politician

John Makin was an English politician.

He was a Member of Parliament (MP) for Colchester in the 16th century. He was married in 1521 to Agnes, the late wife of Robert Rokwoode.
