= Affleck =

- Pronunciation: Af-lek

Origin
- Meaning: From Auchinleck "Field of Stone"
- Region of origin: Scottish

Other names
- Variant form: Auchinleck

Affleck (also spelled Afflect, Aflek, Afflick, etc.) is a Scottish surname that may be of Gaelic origins.

The name is a toponymic surname, derived from several possible places, including Auchinleck, Ayrshire (Scots pronunciation Affleck), Affleck, Lanark and Affleck, Angus. The Gaelic achadh (Anglicized to Auchin) means field.

Notable people with the surname include:

- Arthur Affleck (1903–1966), Australian aviator
- Ben Affleck (born 1972), American actor, film director and screenwriter
- B. F. Affleck (1869–1944), American businessman
- Bruce Affleck (born 1954), retired former professional ice hockey defenceman
- Casey Affleck (born 1975), American actor, Ben Affleck's brother
- David Affleck (1912–1984), Scottish professional footballer
- Edmund Affleck (1725–1788), British naval officer
- Ewan Affleck, Canadian physician
- Francis Affleck (1950–1985), Canadian race car driver
- Gavin Affleck (born 1958), Canadian architect
- George Affleck (footballer) (1888–?), Scottish footballer for Grimsby Town and Leeds City
- George Affleck (entrepreneur) (born 1964), Canadian media businessman
- Gilbert Affleck (1684–1764), British politician
- Ian Affleck (1952–2024), Canadian physicist
- James Ormiston Affleck (1840–1922), Scottish physician and medical author
- John Affleck (1712–1776), British politician
- John Affleck (coach), American college sports coach
- Keith Affleck, Australian sports shooter
- Mary Hunt Affleck (1847–1932), American poet
- Mike Affleck (born 1984), American football player
- Neil Affleck, American actor, animator, and director
- Paul Affleck, Welsh professional golfer
- Philip Affleck (1726–1799), British admiral, younger brother of Sir Edmund Affleck
- Raymond Affleck (1922–1989), Canadian architect
- Simon Affleck (1660–1725), Swedish tax official
- Thomas Affleck (cabinetmaker) (1745–1795), Pennsylvanian cabinetmaker
- Thomas Affleck (planter) (1812–1868), a Scottish-American plantation owner.
- William Affleck (1836–1923), Australian politician
- Affleck baronets, a baronetage of Great Britain
