= Sir James Affleck, 3rd Baronet =

British Army officer

General Sir James Affleck Bt
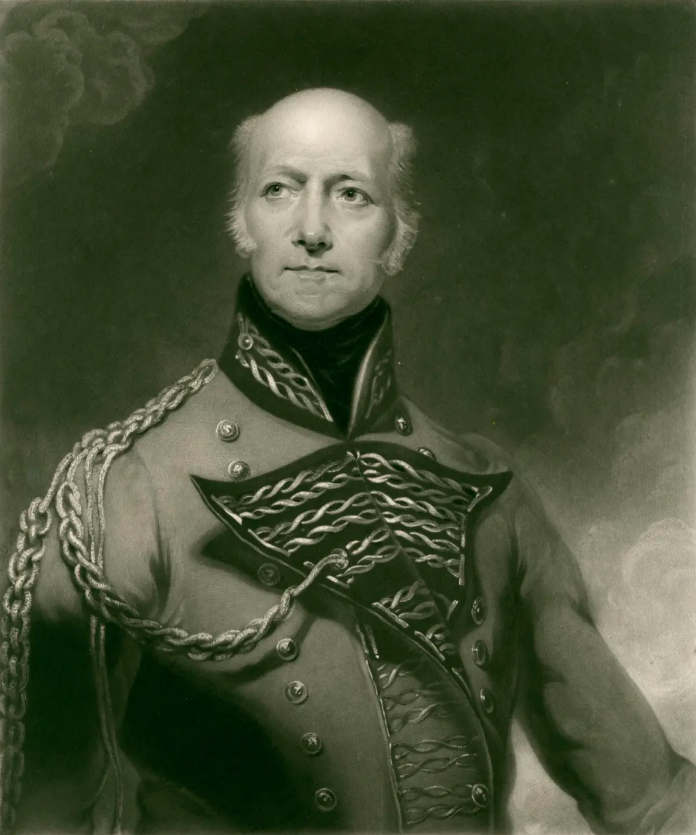
- Engraving by William Say after a portrait by Henry William Pickersgill, 1827
- Born: 29 April 1759; Finedon, Northamptonshire
- Died: 10 August 1833 (aged 74); Dalham Hall, Suffolk
- Education: Westminster School
- Relatives: Philip Affleck (uncle); Sir Edmund Affleck (uncle)
- Military career
- Allegiance: Great Britain; United Kingdom
- Branch: British Army
- Service years: 1776–1833
- Rank: General
- Commands: 16th Light Dragoons; Limerick; Western Military District, Ireland
- Conflicts: American Revolutionary War; Battle of Rhode Island (WIA); Third Anglo-Mysore War; French Revolutionary Wars; Napoleonic Wars

General Sir James Affleck, 3rd Baronet (29 April 1759 – 10 August 1833) was a British Army officer. Affleck's first service was during the American Revolutionary War, in which he was severely wounded at the Battle of Rhode Island in 1778. A cavalryman for most of his career, he served in India during the Third Anglo-Mysore War. Affleck took command of the 16th Light Dragoons in 1795 during the French Revolutionary Wars, serving in garrison in England.

At the start of the Napoleonic Wars in 1803 Affleck was appointed a brigadier-general to command Limerick, advancing to major-general in 1805. He moved to command the Irish Western Military District in 1809, and resigned from that post in 1811 upon his promotion to lieutenant-general. He saw no further service, being promoted to general in 1825.

== Early life ==
James Affleck was born on 29 April 1759 in Finedon, Northamptonshire, the eldest son of the Reverend James Affleck, vicar of Finedon, and Mary née Proctor. His siblings included Robert Affleck and Thomas Affleck, the latter of whom became a captain in the Royal Navy. (Note: Thomas was court martialled in 1796 and sentenced to never command a ship again.) His paternal uncles were Admiral Philip Affleck and Rear-Admiral Sir Edmund Affleck, 1st Baronet. Affleck was educated at Westminster School.

== Military career ==
=== Junior officer ===
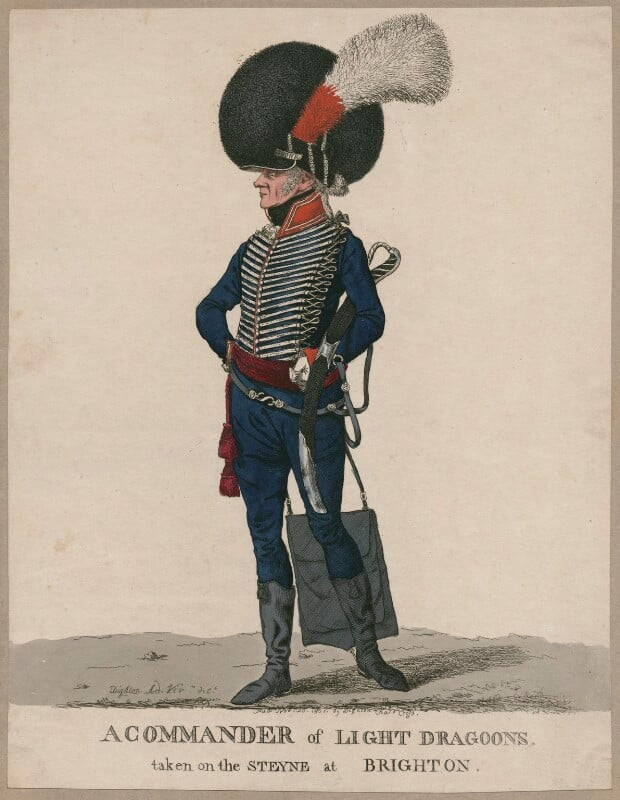
Affleck in Brighton, 1801, by Robert Dighton

Affleck joined the British Army on 29 February 1776, purchasing a commission as an ensign in the 43rd Regiment of Foot. He was sent to North America to serve in the American Revolutionary War in April. Fighting at the Battle of Rhode Island on 29 August 1778, he was seriously wounded and sent back to Britain. He was promoted to lieutenant that December and returned to America in spring 1779, serving with the 43rd again until the regiment was withdrawn later in the year.

Affleck transferred to the 26th Regiment of Foot on 15 September, taking command of a regimental company. He stayed with the 26th until 16 January 1782 when Affleck became a captain-lieutenant in the 23rd Light Dragoons. The regiment was sent to serve in India, sailing from Britain in March. Affleck continued serving there until the first half of 1786 when he was invalided back to Britain with an illness.

Promoted to major via purchase on 6 December that year, Affleck continued serving with the 23rd when the regiment was renumbered as the 19th Light Dragoons. He returned to India in spring 1789 to serve in the Third Anglo-Mysore War. On 20 August 1790, Affleck was in command of a cavalry patrol near Coimbatore on the banks of the Bhavani River. There his patrol came across and attacked a force of Mysorean cavalry, killing 40 of them and capturing twenty horses. In 1791, ill-health forced him to leave the sub-continent for a second time.

=== Senior command ===
With the French Revolutionary Wars ongoing, Affleck was promoted to brevet lieutenant-colonel on 1 March 1794, and became substantive in the rank when he purchased the lieutenant-colonelcy of the 16th Light Dragoons on 25 March 1795. The regiment, which had been serving in the Flanders campaign, returned to Britain in April 1796 and Affleck took command of it at Newbury, Berkshire, in June. In the next month it moved to Weymouth, Dorset, as part of a cavalry division practicing a new system of drill.

After garrisoning parts of southern England, in 1797 the regiment was reviewed by George III on Ashford Common prior to taking up duty as the Royal Escort, stationed at Hounslow. Affleck was advanced to brevet colonel on 1 January 1798. The 16th continued to fulfil garrison roles throughout southern England until September 1802 when it was ordered to Ireland.

Affleck was made a local brigadier-general in Ireland in May 1803, the Napoleonic Wars having begun, and was given command of Limerick. He also served as a magistrate in County Mayo. Affleck was promoted to major-general on 1 January 1805 and continued at Limerick until 1809, when he took command of the Western Military District in the country. He resigned from that post in around September 1811, having been promoted to lieutenant-general on 4 June. He saw no further active service, but was promoted to general on 27 May 1825.

== Personal life ==
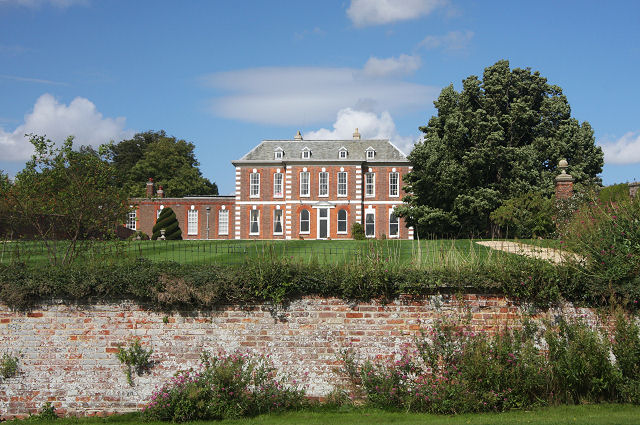
Dalham Hall, Affleck's home

He inherited the family baronetcy from his cousin Sir Gilbert Affleck, 2nd Baronet on 17 July 1808. Affleck died at his home, Dalham Hall in Suffolk, on 10 August 1833. As Affleck was unmarried, the baronetcy was inherited by his brother Robert.

Affleck is memorialised by an obelisk weighing 8 tonnes (8,000 kg) and measuring 18 feet (5.5 m) high, situated in the churchyard of St Mary in Dalham. Politically a conservative, Affleck opposed the Roman Catholic Relief Act 1829 and Reform Act 1832; also highly religious, ten clergymen were the pallbearers at his funeral.

== Citations ==
Baronetage of Great Britain
Preceded by Gilbert Affleck	Baronet (of Dalham Hall); 1808–1833	Succeeded by Robert Affleck
