= Auchinleck (disambiguation) =

Auchinleck is a village in East Ayrshire, Scotland.

Auchinleck may also refer to:

== People ==
- Claude Auchinleck (1884–1981), British field marshal, Commander-in-Chief in India, Supreme Commander of British forces in India and Pakistan
- Alexander Boswell, Lord Auchinleck (1706–1782), a judge of the supreme courts of Scotland.

== Other uses ==
- Auchinleck House, an 18th-century mansion in Scotland near the town of Auchinleck
- Auchinleck Talbot F.C., a Scottish football club
- Auchinleck chronicle, a brief history of Scotland during the reign of James II (1437–1460)
- Auchinleck railway station
- Auchinleck Castle, East Ayrshire, a castle on the eastern bank of the Lugar Water, East Ayrshire, Scotland, built by the Auchinleck family in the 12th century
- Auchinleck manuscript, an illuminated manuscript copied on parchment in the 14th century in London
- Auchinleck, Dumfries and Galloway, in Minnigaff, Kirkcudbright, Scotland
  - Auchinleck Loch, a lake in Galloway Forest Park

== See also ==
- Auchenleck Castle, Angus, Scotland
- Auchinloch, a village in Lanarkshire, Scotland
- Affleck, a related name
- Affleck (disambiguation) for other topics named "Affleck"
