= Gilbert Affleck (disambiguation) =

Gilbert Affleck (c. 1684–1764) was a British politician.

Gilbert Affleck may also refer to:

- Sir Gilbert Affleck, 2nd Baronet of the Affleck baronets (1740–1808)
- Sir Gilbert Affleck, 5th Baronet of the Affleck baronets (1804–1854)
- Gilbert Affleck (fl. 1812) in Suffolk Militia
