= Admiral Affleck =

Admiral Affleck may refer to:

- Edmund Affleck (1725–1788), British Royal Navy rear admiral
- Philip Affleck (c. 1726–1799), British Royal Navy rear admiral
