= Affleck (disambiguation) =

Affleck is a Scottish surname.

Affleck may also refer to:

- Affleck, Aberdeenshire, a rural area in the hamlet of Whiterashes, Scotland
- Affleck, the Scots pronunciation of Auchinleck, a village in Ayrshire, Scotland
- Affleck baronets, baronetage of Great Britain
- Affleck Canal, inlet in Alaska
- Affleck Castle, a tower house in Angus, Scotland
- Affleck House, a house in Michigan designed by Frank Lloyd Wright
- HMS Affleck (K462), a World War II frigate named after Sir Edmund Affleck

== See also ==
- Afflecks, a shopping complex in Manchester, Greater Manchester
