= Isaac Martin Rebow =

Isaac Martin Rebow (28 November 1731 – 3 October 1781) was a British landowner and politician who sat in the House of Commons between 1755 and 1781.

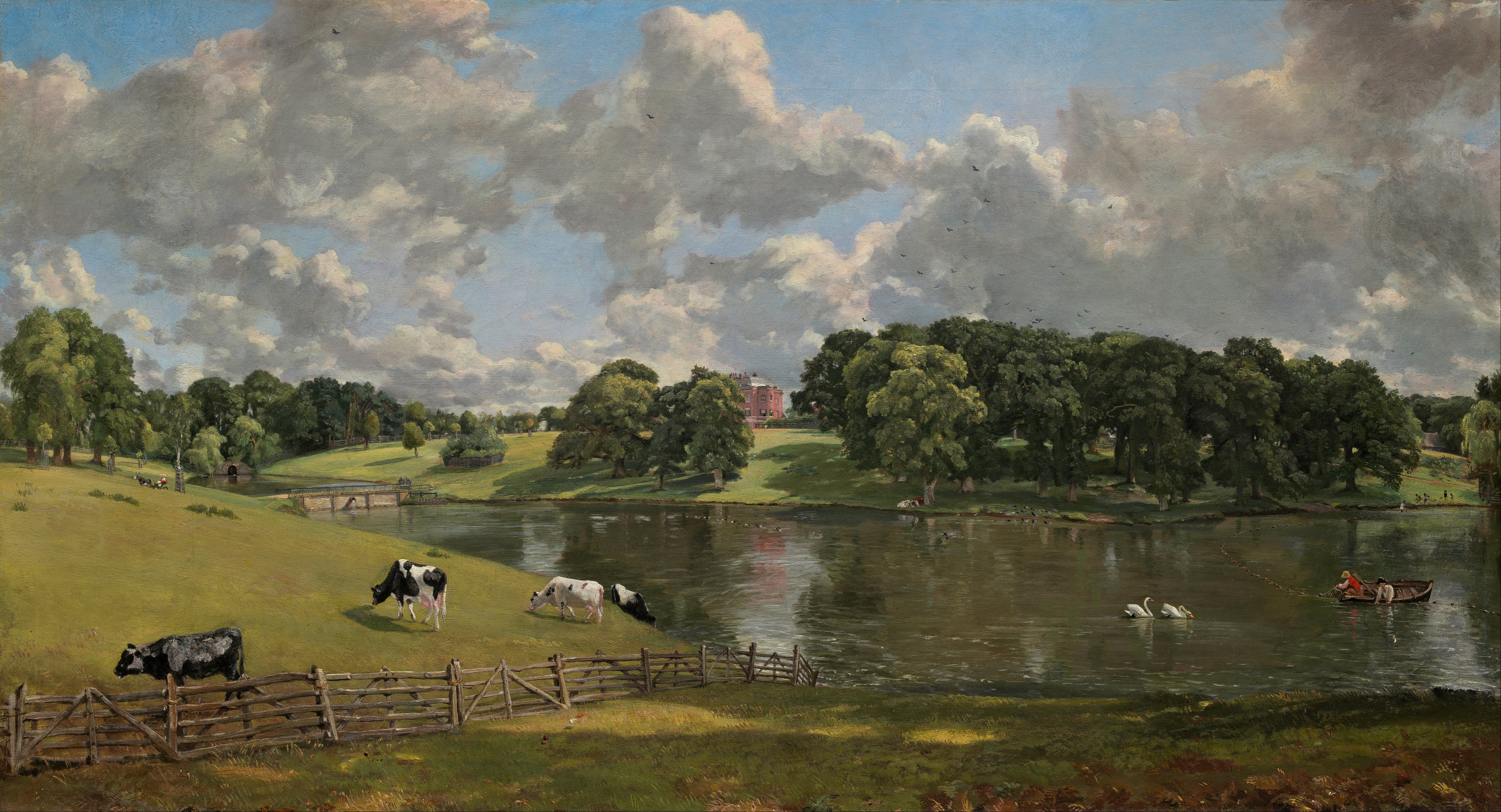
Wivenhoe Park by John Constable, 1816

== Early life ==
Rebow was born on 28 November 1731, the son of Isaac Lemyng Rebow, MP and his wife Mary Martin, daughter of Captain Matthew Martin, MP. He was educated at Eton College from 1745 to 1748 and was admitted at Trinity College, Cambridge on 8 December 1748. He was awarded BA in 1753. He succeeded his father in 1735, inheriting Wivenhoe Park near Colchester, and in 1759 commissioned Thomas Reynolds to build a house there.

== Career ==
In the 1754 general election Rebow stood for Parliament at Colchester and was defeated by a narrow margin. However the poll was conducted in a scandalous manner and Rebow was seated as Member of Parliament on petition in 1755. The main local issue was the loss of the Borough's charter and the campaign to regain it. The displaced member Charles Gray was chastened by the experience but in the 1761 general election they agreed to cooperate and were returned unopposed. They managed to obtain a new charter in 1763 in the same form as the previous one and in it Rebow was named as Recorder of Colchester. He held the post until his death. Rebow and Gray oversaw almost twenty years of compromise and in a contest at Colchester in the 1768 general election they saw off a third candidate, Rebow topping the poll.

== Family life ==
Rebow married his cousin Mary Martin, daughter of Thomas Martin of Alresford Hall, Essex at St Margaret's Westminster on 27 August 1772. He had previously been in a relationship with another cousin Sophia Christianna de Hopman with whom he had had an illegitimate child but he continued to support her after his marriage.

== Later life ==
Rebow and Gray were both returned unopposed in the 1774 general election but by July 1780 Rebow was in a very poor state of health and it was uncertain whether he would stand for parliament again. Nevertheless, he was returned again for Colchester in 1780 after a contest. Though active locally, Rebow was inactive in Parliament and the King wrote in 1781 with regard to some changes made at Colchester that ”Rebow was so bad an attender and so doubtful in his conduct that the change seems advantageous.”

Rebow died on 3 October 1781 and was buried at St Mary's, Colchester, leaving 3 daughters. Wivenhoe Park passed to his daughter Mary Hester, who married General Francis Slater, who then took the surname Rebow.

Parliament of Great Britain
| Preceded by John Olmius; Charles Gray | Member of Parliament for Colchester; 1755–1781; With: John Olmius 1755–1761; Charles Gray 1761–1780; Sir Robert Smyth, Bt 1780–1781 | Succeeded by Sir Robert Smyth, Bt; Christopher Potter |
