= Samuel Shepheard (died 1748) =

English politician (1677–1748)

Samuel Shepheard (1677–1748), of Exning, Suffolk, near Newmarket, Cambridgeshire, was an English Tory politician who sat in the English House of Commons in 1701 and in the British House of Commons almost continually for forty years from 1708 to 1748.

Shepheard was the second surviving son of Samuel Shepheard and his wife Mary Chamberlayne, daughter of Edward Chamberlayne of Princethorpe, Warwickshire. He was a director of the East India Company from 1717 to 1720. When his unmarried elder brother Francis died in 1739, he inherited his estate, including Exning House.

Shepheard was elected Member of Parliament (MP) for Malmesbury at the first general election in 1701 but did not stand again at the second. At the 1708 general election he was elected MP for Cambridge. His election was declared void on 9 February 1710 but he won the re-election on 22 February. He was returned unopposed in the general elections of 1710 and 1713. At the 1715 general election he was initially defeated, but was seated on petition on 27 May 1715. He did not stand at Cambridge in 1722, but instead was elected MP for Cambridgeshire at a by-election on 19 November 1724. He was elected again at the 1727 general election with his former ward Henry Bromley, and was returned unopposed in 1734 and 1741. At the 1747 general election he was returned again as MP for Cambridge.

Shepheard died of an apoplectic stroke at Hampton Court on his way back from Bath on 24 April 1748. While he never married, his illegitimate daughter Frances inherited his estate and married Charles Ingram, 9th Viscount of Irvine in 1758.

Parliament of England
Preceded by Michael Wicks; Edward Pauncefort	Member of Parliament for Malmesbury; 1701; With: Edward Pauncefort	Succeeded by Sir Charles Hedges; Edward Pauncefort
Parliament of Great Britain
Preceded by Anthony Thompson; Sir John Cotton, Bt	Member of Parliament for Cambridge; 1708–1715; With: Sir John Hynde Cotton, Bt	Succeeded by Sir John Hynde Cotton, Bt; Thomas Sclater
Preceded by Sir John Hynde Cotton, Bt; Thomas Sclater	Member of Parliament for Cambridge; 1715–1722; With: Sir John Hynde Cotton, Bt	Succeeded by Sir John Hynde Cotton, Bt; Thomas Bacon
Preceded by Sir John Hynde Cotton, Bt; Lord Harley	Member of Parliament for Cambridgeshire; 1724–1747; With: Sir John Hynde Cotton, Bt 1724-1727; Henry Bromley 1727-1741; Soame Jenyns 1741-1747	Succeeded by Soame Jenyns; Viscount Royston
Preceded by Viscount Dupplin; Christopher Jeaffreson	Member of Parliament for Cambridge; 1747–1748; With: Viscount Dupplin	Succeeded by Viscount Dupplin; Christopher Jeaffreson
