= Sir John Hynde Cotton, 3rd Baronet =

English Tory Politician and Jacobite

Sir John Hynde Cotton Bt
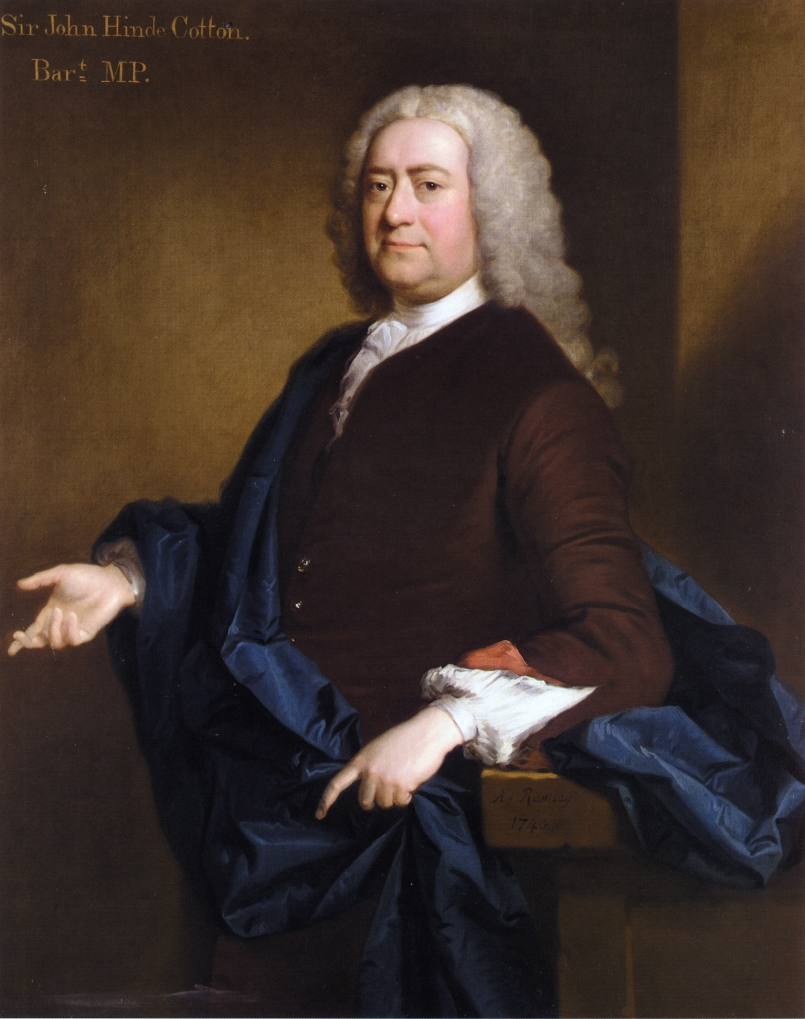

Treasurer of the Chamber
- In office 1744–1746
- Monarch: George II
- Prime Minister: Henry Pelham
- Preceded by: Lord Hobart
- Succeeded by: Richard Arundell

Member of Parliament for Marlborough
- In office 1741–1752

Member of Parliament for Cambridge
- In office 1727–1741

Member of Parliament for Cambridgeshire
- In office 1722–1727

Member of Parliament for Cambridge
- In office 1708–1722

Personal details
- Born: 1686 England
- Died: 4 January 1752 (aged 66) St James's, London, England
- Resting place: Cambridgeshire
- Party: Tory
- Children: Sir John Hynde Cotton, 4th Baronet
- Education: Westminster School
- Alma mater: Emmanuel College, Cambridge

Sir John Hynde Cotton, 3rd Baronet (bapt. 7 April 1686 – 4 January 1752) was an English landowner and Tory politician who sat in the British House of Commons from 1708 to 1752. British historian Eveline Cruickshanks called him "one of the most zealous Jacobites in England".

== Early life ==
Cotton was baptized on 7 April 1686, the eldest and only surviving son of Sir John Cotton, 2nd Baronet, of Landwade and Madingley Hall, Cambridgeshire who had been MP for Cambridge. He was educated at Westminster School and was admitted at Emmanuel College, Cambridge on 29 September 1701 and awarded MA in 1705. He succeeded to the baronetcy and Madingley Hall on the death of his father on 15 January 1713. He adopted the surname of Hynde Cotton in deference to the Hynde family, traditional owners of the Hall: his paternal grandfather, the first Baronet, had married into the Hynde family.

== Politics ==
Cotton was returned as the Member of Parliament for Cambridge for 1708–1722 followed by terms as the member for Cambridgeshire for 1722–1727, Cambridge again for 1727–1741 and Marlborough for 1741–1752. A High Tory, he was appointed vice-president of the Loyal Brotherhood which was established in 1709.

After an MP deserted the Tories and made a speech loyal to Sir Robert Walpole, Cotton criticised him to Walpole, saying "That young dog promised that he would always stand by us". Sir Robert replied: "I advise my young men never to use always". "Yet", said Cotton, stammering, "you yourself are very apt to make use of all ways".

Horace Walpole wrote that Cotton "had wit and the faithful attendant of wit, ill nature; and was the greatest master of the arts of the House, where he seldom made but short speeches, having a stammering in his elocution, which however he knew how to manage with humour. In the end of Queen Anne's reign he was in place; during Sir Robert Walpole's administration constantly and warmly in opposition; and was so determined a Jacobite, that though on the late coalition he accepted a place in the household and held it two years, he never gave a vote with the court, which argued nice distinction, not only in taking the oaths to the King (for that all the Jacobites in Parliament do) but in taking his pay and yet obstructing his service: and as nice in the King's ministers, who could discover the use of making a man accept a salary, without changing his party".

== Private life ==
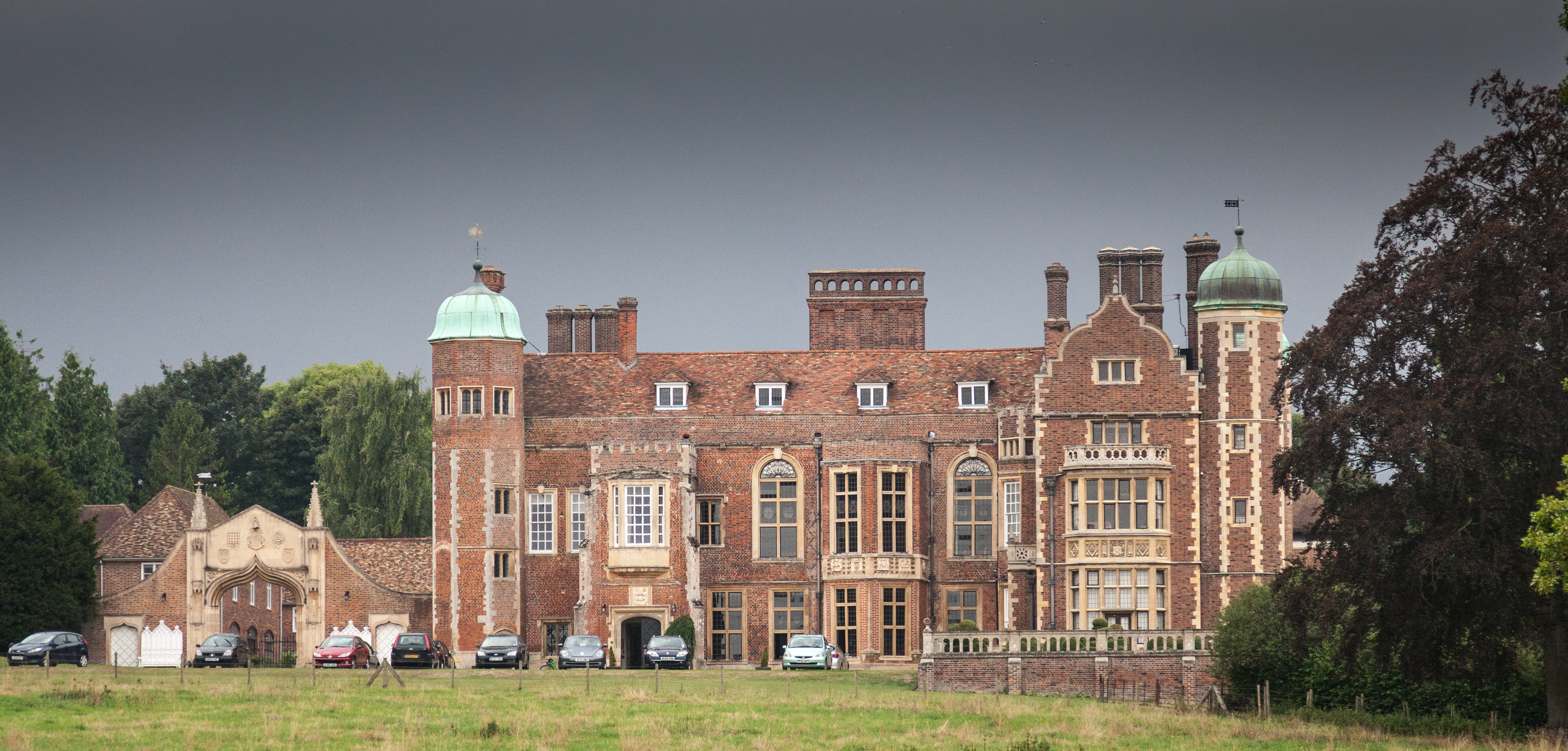
Madingley Hall, Cambridgeshire

Cotton married firstly (with c.£8,500) Lettice Crowley, daughter of Sir Ambrose Crowley of Greenwich on 24 May 1714. The couple were married by the Archbishop of York at St Mary's Church, Kensington. She died in August 1718 and he married secondly Margaret Craggs, the daughter of James Craggs on 3 June 1724. He was succeeded in the baronetcy by his only surviving son, John Hynde Cotton, child of his first wife.

They lived at Madingley Hall for 40 years during which time he transformed it from a panelled Tudor house into a Baroque building.

== Notes ==
- "Cotton, John Hynde" . Dictionary of National Biography. London: Smith, Elder & Co. 1885–1900.

Parliament of Great Britain
Preceded by Anthony Thompson; Sir John Cotton, Bt	Member of Parliament for Cambridge; 1708–1722; With: Samuel Shepheard 1708–1715, 1715–1722; Thomas Sclater (Bacon) 1715, 1722	Succeeded by Thomas Bacon; Gilbert Affleck
Preceded by Sir Robert Clarke, Bt; Francis Whichcote	Member of Parliament for Cambridgeshire; 1722–1727; With: Lord Harley 1722–1724; Samuel Shepheard 1724–1727	Succeeded by Samuel Shepheard; Henry Bromley
Preceded by Thomas Bacon; Gilbert Affleck	Member of Parliament for Cambridge; 1727–1741; With: Thomas Bacon 1727–1737; Gilbert Affleck 1737–1741	Succeeded by Viscount Dupplin; James Martin
Preceded by Francis Seymour; John Crawley	Member of Parliament for Marlborough; 1741–1752; With: John Crawley 1741–1747; John Talbot 1747–1752	Succeeded by John Talbot; Sir John Hynde Cotton, Bt
Political offices
Preceded by The Lord Hobart	Treasurer of the Chamber; 1744–1746	Succeeded by Richard Arundell
Baronetage of England
Preceded by John Cotton	Baronet (of Landwade); 1713–1752	Succeeded by John Hynde Cotton
