= Robert Affleck =

Robert Affleck may refer to:

- Robert Bruce Affleck (born 1954), Canadian ice hockey player
- Sir Robert Affleck, 4th Baronet of the Affleck Baronets (1763–1851)
- Sir Robert Affleck, 6th Baronet of the Affleck Baronets (1805–1882)
- Sir Robert Affleck, 7th Baronet of the Affleck Baronets (1852–1919)
