= Sclater baronets =

Extinct baronetcy in the Baronetage of England

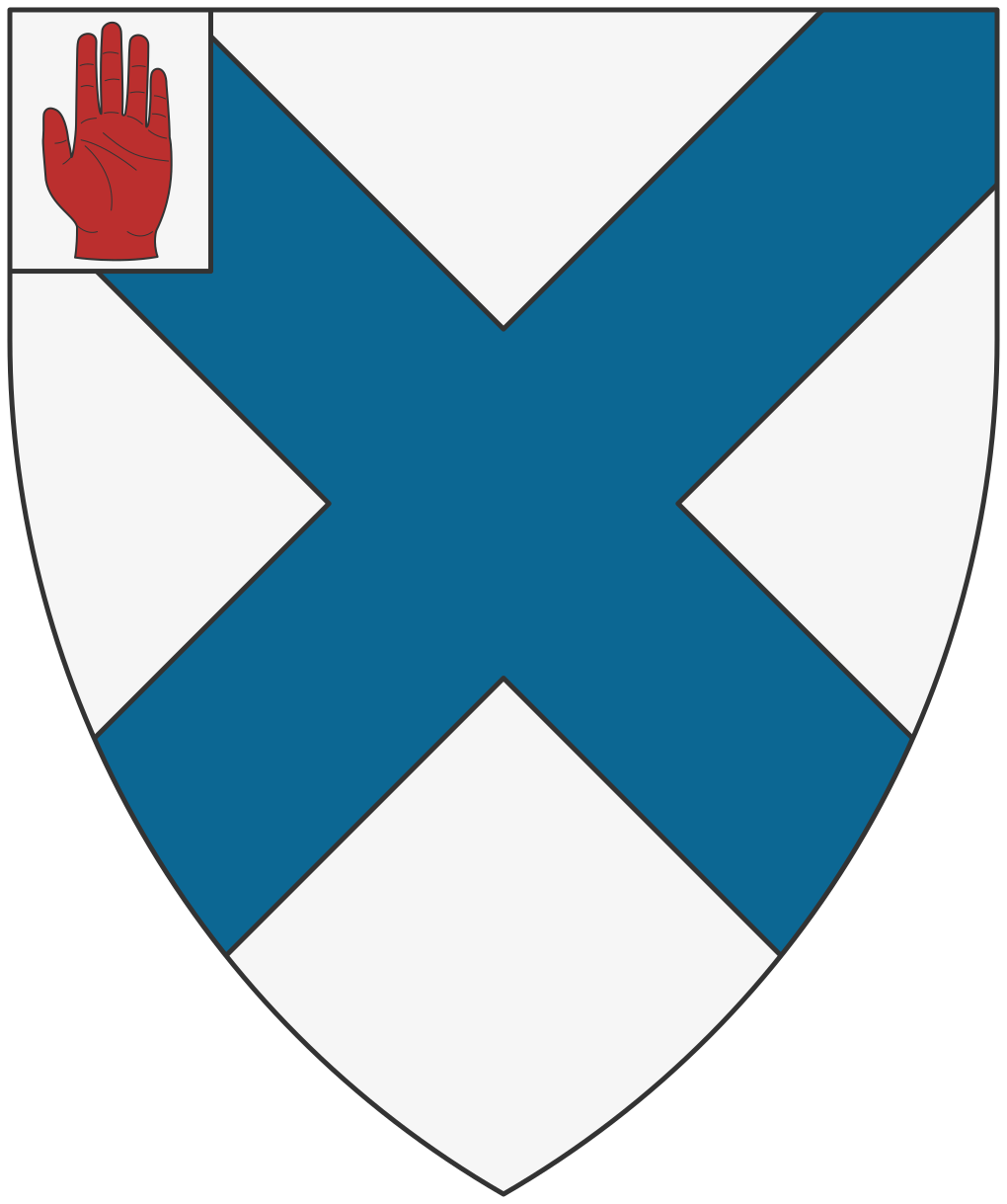
The coat of arms of the Sclater baronets

The Sclater Baronetcy, of Cambridge in the County of Cambridge, was a title in the Baronetage of England. It was created on 25 July 1660 for Thomas Sclater, of Catley Park, sometime High Sheriff of Cambridgeshire. He was childless and the title became extinct on his death in 1684. He devised his estates to his great-nephew Thomas Sclater, Member of Parliament for Cambridgeshire, who assumed the additional surname of Bacon in circa 1716.

== Sclater baronets, of Cambridge (1660) ==
- Sir Thomas Sclater, 1st Baronet (1615–1684)
