= Cotton baronets =

Title in the Baronetage of England

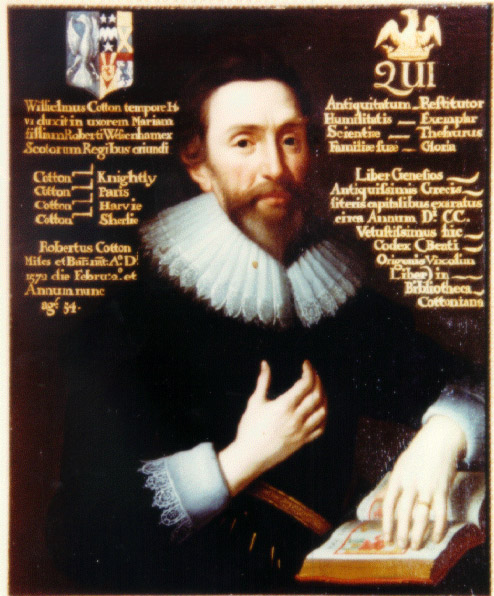
Sir Robert Cotton, 1st Baronet

There have been three Baronetcies created for persons with the surname Cotton, all in the Baronetage of England. One creation is extant as of 2008.

The Cotton Baronetcy, of Conington in the County of Huntingdon, was created in the Baronetage of England on 29 June 1611 for the antiquary Robert Cotton, who also represented five constituencies in the House of Commons. The second Baronet sat as Member of Parliament for Great Marlow, St Germans and Huntingdonshire. The third and fourth Baronets both represented Huntingdon and Huntingdonshire in Parliament. The title became extinct on the death of the sixth Baronet in 1752.

The Cotton Baronetcy, of Landwade in the County of Cambridge, was created in the Baronetage of England on 14 July 1641 for John Cotton. The second Baronet sat as Member of Parliament for Cambridge. The third Baronet represented Cambridge, Cambridgeshire and Marlborough in the House of Commons. The fourth Baronet was Member of Parliament for St Germans, Marlborough and Cambridgeshire. The fifth Baronet was a distinguished naval commander. The title became extinct on the death of the sixth Baronet in 1863.

The Cotton Baronetcy, of Combermere in the County of Chester, was created in the Baronetage of England on 29 March 1677. For more information on this creation, see the Viscount Combermere.

== Cotton baronets, of Connington (1611) ==
Escutcheon of the Cotton baronets of Connington

- Sir Robert Bruce Cotton, 1st Baronet (1571–1631)
- Sir Thomas Cotton, 2nd Baronet (1594–1662)
- Sir John Cotton, 3rd Baronet (1621–1702)
- Sir John Cotton, 4th Baronet (c. 1680–1731)
- Sir Robert Cotton, 5th Baronet (c. 1669–1749)
- Sir John Cotton, 6th Baronet (died 1752)

== Cotton baronets of Landwade (1641) ==
Escutcheon of the Cotton baronets of Landwade

- Sir John Cotton, 1st Baronet (1615–1689)
- Sir John Cotton, 2nd Baronet (c. 1648–1713)
- Sir John Hynde Cotton, 3rd Baronet (1686–1752)
- Sir John Hynde Cotton, 4th Baronet (c. 1717–1795)
- Sir Charles Cotton, 5th Baronet (c. 1758–1812)
- Sir St Vincent Cotton, 6th Baronet (1801–1863)

== Cotton baronets of Combermere, Cheshire (1677) ==
- see the Viscount Combermere

Baronetage of England
| Preceded by Noel baronets | Cotton baronets 29 June 1611 | Succeeded by Cholmondeley baronets |
