= Sir Robert Smyth, 5th Baronet =

British politician and revolutionary (1744–1802)

Sir Robert Smyth, 5th Baronet (10 January 1744 – 12 April 1802) was a British politician and revolutionary who sat in the House of Commons between 1774 and 1790.

Smyth was the son of Rev. Robert Smyth, vicar of Woolavington, Sussex, and his wife Dorothy Lloyd, daughter of Thomas Lloyd of Dolyglunnen, Merioneth. He was educated at Westminster School. He was admitted at Lincoln's Inn on 3 April 1761 and matriculated at Trinity College, Cambridge at Easter 1762. He succeeded his cousin Sir Trafford Smyth, 4th Baronet in the baronetcy on 8 December 1765. In 1766 he was awarded MA and in 1775 MA.

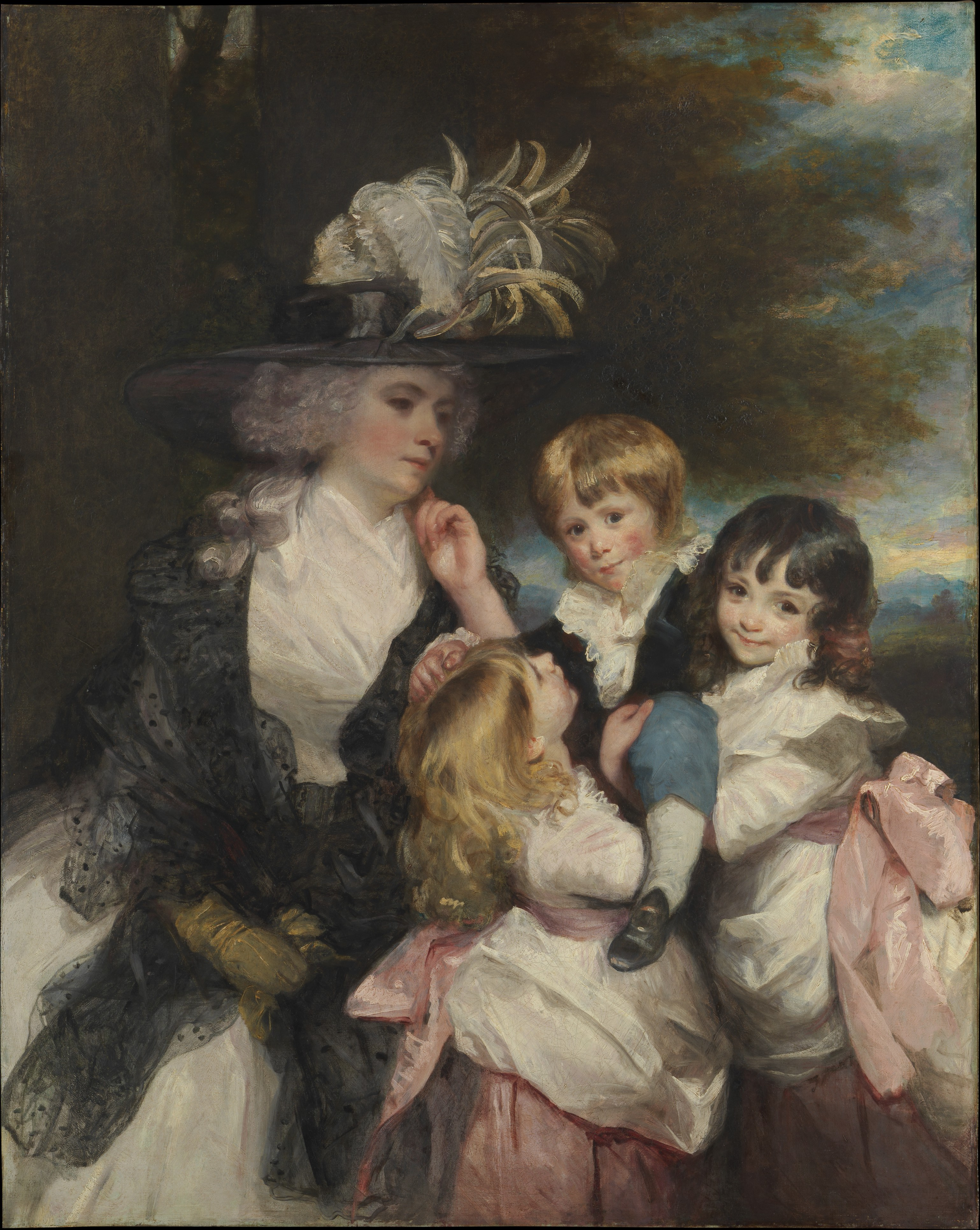
Charlotte Lady Smyth and her children (Joshua Reynolds, circa 1787)

In the 1774 general election Smyth was returned as Member of Parliament for Cardigan Boroughs but was unseated on petition on 7 December 1775. He married Charlotte Sophia Blake on 17 September 1776. In the 1780 general election he was returned as MP for Colchester. He stood at Colchester again in 1784 and was defeated but was then seated on petition. He did not stand again in 1790.

Smyth then became a banker and settled in Paris. In 1792 William Lindsay wrote that Smyth had become "a violent democrat ... intimately connected with some of the leading republicans" adding that he "is extremely violent, and will do all the mischief in his power during his stay here". He was a member of the British revolutionary club in Paris and a close friend of Thomas Paine. At a dinner in November 1792 he renounced his title and proposed a toast to "The speedy abolition of all hereditary titles and feudal distinctions". However he was imprisoned during the Terror. In 1796 Paine helped him obtain a passport to go to Hamburg to collect remittances from England. He did not return to England for, as Paine wrote to the French minister, he liked "neither the Government nor climate of England". Smyth died in Paris on 12 April 1807.

Parliament of Great Britain
Preceded by Ralph Congreve	Member of Parliament for Cardigan Boroughs; 1774– 1775	Succeeded by Thomas Johnes
Preceded by Charles Gray; Isaac Martin Rebow	Member of Parliament for Colchester; 1780–1784; With: Isaac Martin Rebow; Christopher Potter; Sir Edmund Affleck, Bt	Succeeded by Christopher Potter; Sir Edmund Affleck, Bt
Preceded by Christopher Potter; Sir Edmund Affleck, Bt	Member of Parliament for Colchester; 1784–1790; With: Sir Edmund Affleck, Bt; George Tierney	Succeeded by Robert Thornton; George Jackson
Baronetage of England
Preceded by Trafford Smyth	Baronet (of Upton); 1765–1802	Succeeded by George Henry Smyth
