= Dalham =

Village in Suffolk, England

Coordinates: 52.227°N 0.520°E

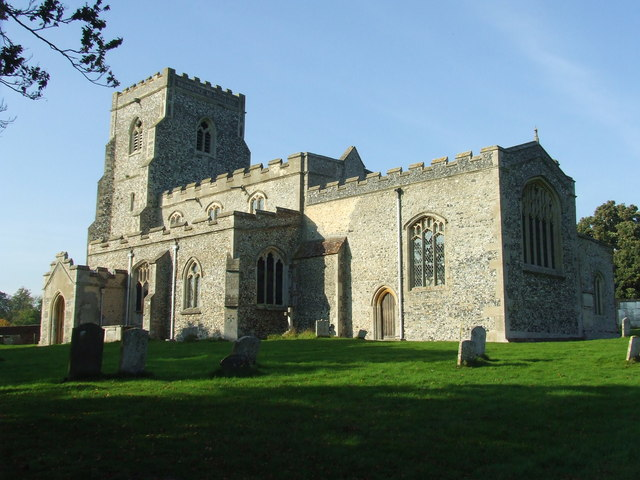
- Dalham, Church of St Mary

- Location within Suffolk
- Population: 210 (2011)
- OS grid reference: TL7261
- District: West Suffolk
- Shire county: Suffolk
- Region: East
- Country: England
- Sovereign state: United Kingdom
- Post town: NEWMARKET
- Postcode district: CB8
- Dialling code: 01638
- Police: Suffolk
- Fire: Suffolk
- Ambulance: East of England
- UK Parliament: West Suffolk

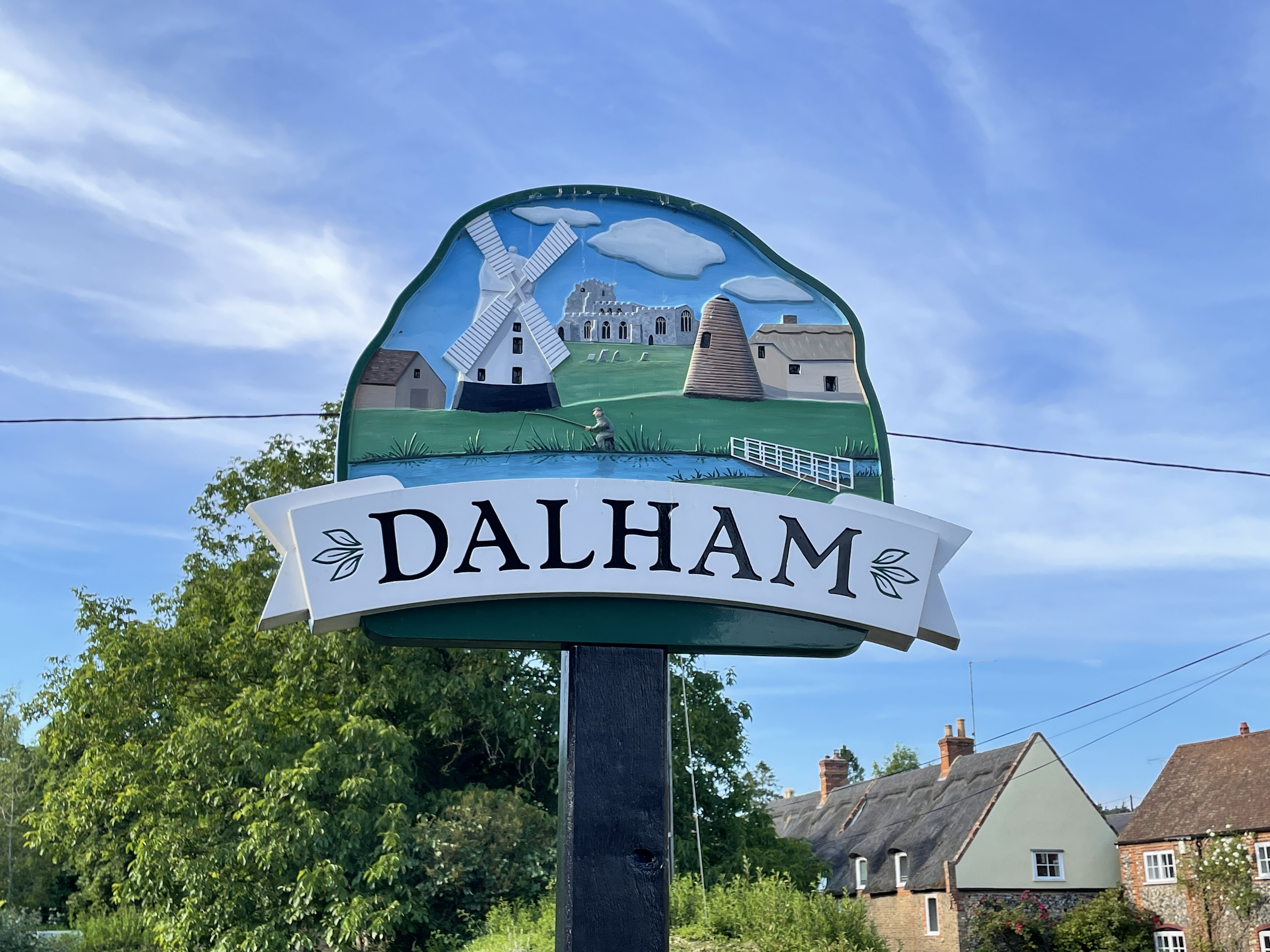
Dalham village sign

Dalham is a village and civil parish in the West Suffolk district of Suffolk, England. The name, meaning 'homestead/village in a valley' is of Old English origin and first recorded in the Domesday Book.

Dalham is 13 kilometres (8 mi) west of the town of Bury St Edmunds and, at the 2001 census, had a population of 191, increasing to 210 at the 2011 Census. The Icknield Way Path passes through the village on its 110-mile journey from Ivinghoe Beacon in Buckinghamshire to Knettishall Heath in Suffolk. The Icknield Way Trail, a multi-user route for walkers, horse riders and off-road cyclists also passes through the village.

== Dalham Hall ==
In 1901 the estate of Dalham Hall was bought by Cecil Rhodes. After he died in 1902 without taking possession, his brother Colonel Francis William Rhodes became the owner, and erected the village hall in his brother's memory.

Dalham Hall and its associated stud are owned by the ruler of Dubai, Sheikh Mohammed bin Rashid Al Maktoum.

== Notable residents ==
- Gilbert Affleck c. 1684 – 1764, Member of Parliament (MP) for Cambridge
- Philip Affleck c. 1726 – 1799, Admiral, commander-in-chief of the Jamaica Station and Lord of the Board of Admiralty
