= Richard Savage Nassau =

English Member of Parliament

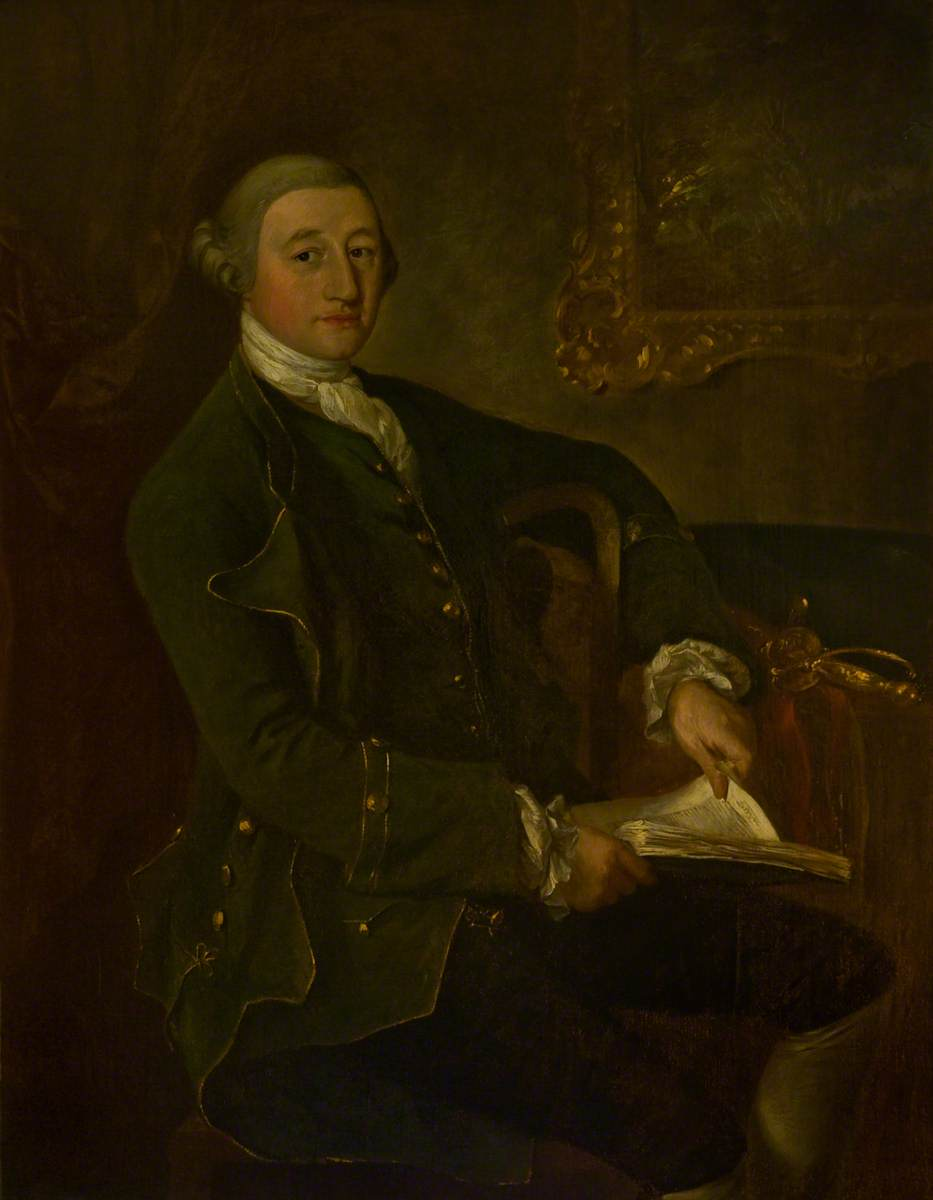
Richard Savage Nassau de Zuylestein (1723-1780), 2nd Son of the 3rd Earl of Rochford, in a painting by Thomas Gainsborough.

Richard Savage Nassau (1 June 1723 – 17 May 1780) was an English Member of Parliament who served from 1747 to 1780, with a 20-year gap between 1754 and 1774.

He was born at St Osyth's Priory, the second son of Frederick Nassau de Zuylestein, 3rd Earl of Rochford, by his wife Bessy, an illegitimate daughter of Richard Savage, 4th Earl Rivers.

He was first elected to Parliament at the 1747 general election for Colchester along with Charles Gray. He supported the government of Henry Pelham and the Duke of Newcastle and did not seek re-election at the next general election in 1754.

On 24 December 1751 he was married to Anne (died 9 March 1771), daughter of Edward Spencer of Rendlesham and widow of James Hamilton, 5th Duke of Hamilton. They had two sons and one daughter:

- William Henry Nassau (28 June 1754 – 3 September 1830)
- George Richard Savage Nassau (5 September 1758 – 18 September 1823)
- Lucy Nassau (3 November 1752 – before 1830).

The elder son William Henry had been intended by his uncle and namesake William Henry Nassau, 4th Earl of Rochford to enter the House of Commons for Maldon when he came of age in 1775. However, the seat became vacant earlier than expected following the death of John Huske in October 1773. Richard Nassau refused to stand as he was still recovering from the death of his second wife on 18 October, so Charles Rainsford was returned instead. However, at the general election the following year, Nassau was reluctantly elected, with Lord North agreeing to pay the costs. He attended Parliament as seldom as possible and is never recorded as having spoken there.

As well as sitting in Parliament, Nassau was a Groom of the Bedchamber from January to October 1760, and Clerk of the Board of Green Cloth from 1771 to his death.

His son never sat in the House of Commons, but succeeded as fifth and last Earl of Rochford on 28 September 1781.

Parliament of Great Britain
| Preceded by Samuel Savill; Charles Grey | Member of Parliament for Colchester; 1747–1754; With: Charles Grey | Succeeded by John Olmius; Charles Grey |
| Preceded by John Bullock; Charles Rainsford | Member of Parliament for Maldon; 1774–1780; With: John Strutt | Succeeded by John Strutt; Eliab Harvey |
