= Sir Charles Cotton, 5th Baronet =

Royal Navy officer (1753–1812)

Sir Charles Cotton Bt
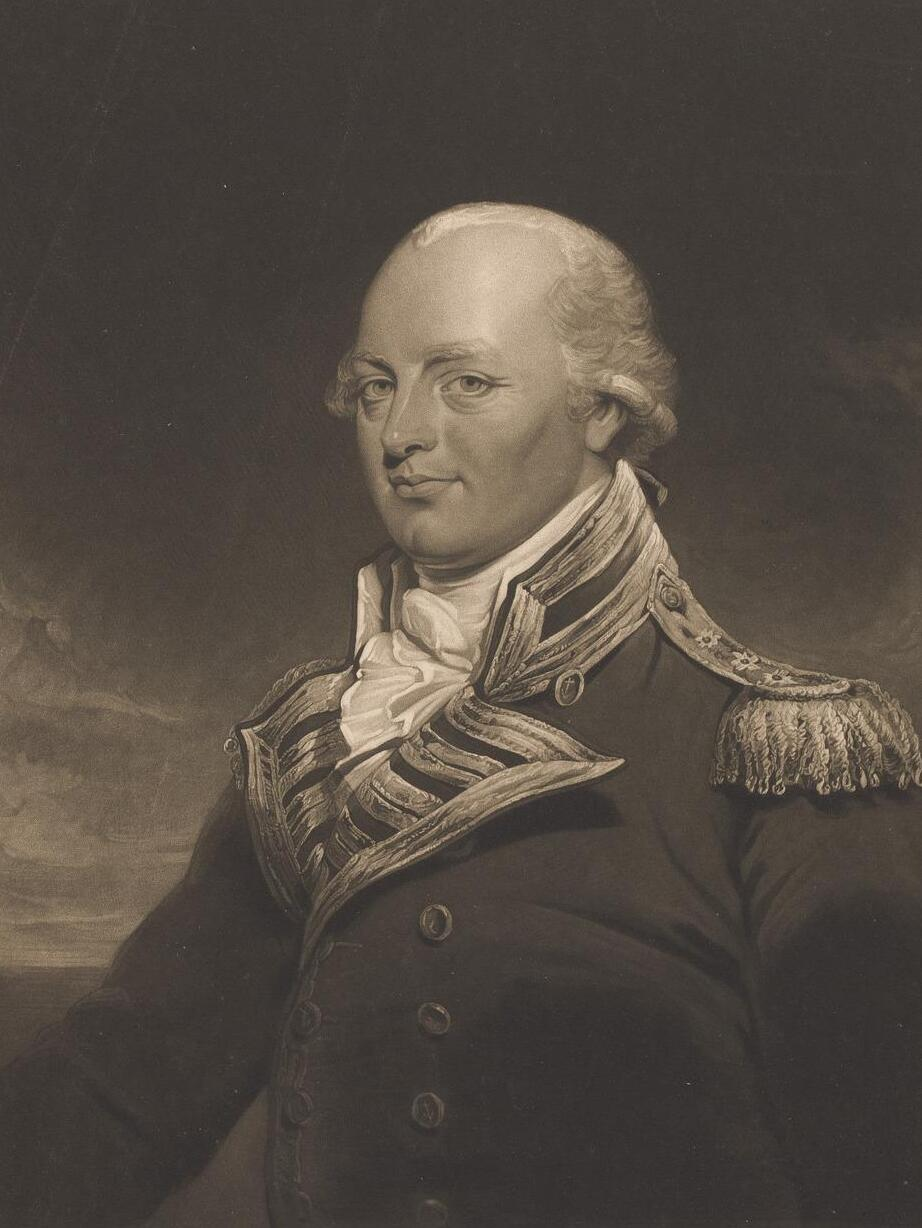
- Engraving of Cotton by Henry Hoppner Meyer
- Born: June 1753
- Died: 23 February 1812 (aged 58); Stoke House, Plymouth
- Military career
- Allegiance: Great Britain; United Kingdom
- Branch: Royal Navy
- Service years: 1772–1812
- Rank: Admiral
- Commands: Lisbon Station; Mediterranean Fleet
- Conflicts: American Revolutionary War; Boston campaign; Long Island campaign; Battle of Martinique; Battle of the Saintes; French Revolutionary Wars; Glorious First of June; Cornwallis's Retreat; Napoleonic Wars; Corunna Campaign

Admiral Sir Charles Cotton, 5th Baronet (June 1753 – 23 February 1812) was a Royal Navy officer who served in the French Revolutionary and Napoleonic Wars whose service continued until his death in command of the Channel Fleet from apoplexy in 1812. During his service, Cotton saw action off the Eastern Seaboard of the Thirteen Colonies and later at the Glorious First of June. Cotton's most influential service was in 1809 when he planned and executed the evacuation of thousands of British soldiers from Corunna after the disastrous collapse of the land campaign under Sir John Moore.

== Early career ==
Cotton was the third child of Sir John Hynde Cotton, 4th Baronet, MP and Anne Parsons, daughter of Humphrey Parsons, Lord Mayor of London. Cotton was educated at Westminster School and Lincoln's Inn before joining the Royal Navy in 1772 as a midshipman on HMS Deal Castle. In 1775, during the American Revolutionary War, Cotton joined the frigate HMS Niger and participated in the Boston campaign in 1775 and Long Island campaign in 1776. In 1777, Cotton took command of the floating battery HMS Vigilant off the Chesapeake and supported the landing of British troops off the river. He was also promoted to lieutenant during the campaign.

On 10 August 1779, Cotton was promoted to post captain aboard the ship of the line HMS Boyne and in her joined the fleet under Sir George Rodney in the West Indies. The following year, Cotton joined Rodney in action at the Battle of Martinique, when the French and British fleets fought an inconclusive action off the island. Cotton then returned the aged Boyne to Britain where she was paid off and Cotton given the frigate HMS Alarm which he returned to the West Indies. In 1782, Cotton commanded her at the Battle of the Saintes as a repeating ship for Rodney's signals. After the peace of 1783, Cotton returned to Britain.

== French Revolutionary Wars ==
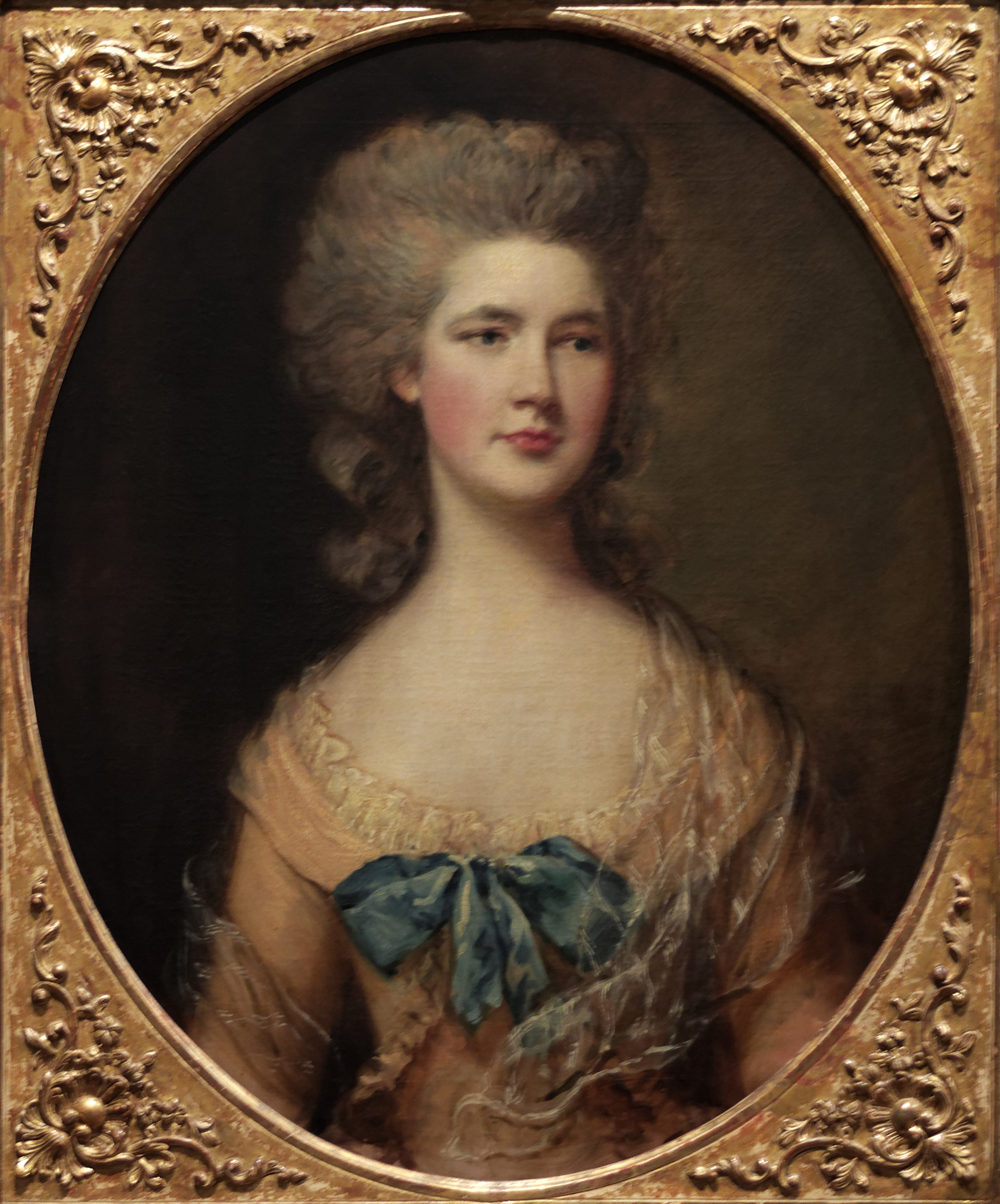
Miss Philadelphia Rowley, Thomas Gainsborough (ca 1783)

In England, Cotton settled at Madingley and married Philadelphia Rowley, daughter of Admiral Sir Joshua Rowley. The couple had four surviving children and settled into genteel retirement during the peace of the 1780s. In 1793, two weeks after the French Revolutionary Wars broke out, Cotton was recalled to service in HMS Majestic and joined the Channel Fleet under Lord Howe. In June 1794, Majestic was engaged at the Glorious First of June where Cotton took a long-time to join the action, failing to reach the French until late in the engagement and taking possession of Sans Pareil. Despite joining the fighting, Lord Howe omitted Cotton from his dispatch of the battle and as a result, Cotton was denied official recognition and did not receive the Gold Medal given to many of the officers present at the action.

Despite this snub, Cotton remained in service and in January 1795 inherited the baronetcy upon the death of his father. He moved to HMS Mars and in June was with the fleet under William Cornwallis at Cornwallis's action, when a squadron of British ships were overhauled by a much larger French fleet under Villaret de Joyeuse. Mars was badly damaged and fell behind the other ships. When Cornwallis turned to rescue Cotton, Villaret shied off, believing that Cornwallis had support over the horizon. Cotton and Cornwallis were both highly praised for this action.

In 1797, Cotton was promoted to rear-admiral and two years later hoisted his flag in HMS Prince. In June 1799, Cotton pursued a French squadron from Brest to the Mediterranean and there served under Lord Keith, unsuccessfully pursuing the same squadron on its return to Northern European waters. In 1802 he was promoted to vice-admiral and between 1802 and 1805 worked actively in the Channel Fleet to hinder and forestall French invasion plans against Britain.

== Napoleonic Wars ==
With the Battle of Trafalgar and the collapse of French hopes of invasion, Cotton took command of several ships stationed off the Tagus in Portugal. After the French invasion of Iberia, Cotton closely supported the Portuguese defences and subsequently, the army under Sir Arthur Wellesley which fought at the Battle of Vimeiro. Admiral Cotton, newly promoted, objected to the Convention of Sintra which ended the campaign and refused to acknowledge the provision which allowed the blockaded Russian squadron in Lisbon safe passage back to Russia. Maintaining the blockade over the objections of allies and enemies alike, Cotton eventually forced the Russian admiral to agree to a revision of the treaty in which his ships remained legally Russian but would be held in a disarmed state in a British harbour for the duration of Anglo-Russian hostilities.

In 1808, Cotton remained off Portugal and arranged Lisbon as the principal harbour for the British invasion of Iberia later in the year. He also planned and executed the seaborne extraction of the 30,000 men of Sir John Moore's army trapped in Galicia. Cotton's plans allowed a fleet to transport to remove the vast majority of the army after they had defeated close French pursuit at the Battle of Corunna. Late in the year, Cotton was recalled to Britain.

In 1810, Cotton was chosen as Lord Collingwood's replacement in command of the Mediterranean Fleet after Collingwood's sudden death. This was the second most senior seagoing command in the Navy, and Cotton continued the close blockade of the French fleet in Toulon and expanded operations from the sea against French troops operating in Southern Spain. In mid-1811, Cotton was recalled to Britain and took command of the Channel Fleet from Lord Gambier on the latter's retirement. Cotton was in the post just five months when on 23 February 1812 he collapsed and died of apoplexy in Plymouth after inspecting the fleet in its winter berths.

Cotton was survived by his wife and their four children. Lady Cotton was born Philadelphia Rowley, daughter of Admiral Sir Joshua Rowley 1st Bt, and granddaughter of Admiral of the Fleet Sir William Rowley. The Rowleys were already a prominent naval dynasty, with three baronetcies gained by individual family members. Cotton married Philadelphia Rowley in 1798. Of their four children, the eldest son became Sir St Vincent Cotton, 6th Baronet at the age of 10. (He only married shortly before his death in 1863, and the baronetcy became extinct with his death in January 1863). His daughter Susanna Rowley later Lady King was the second wife of Vice-Admiral Sir Richard King, 2nd Bt, as of 1822, and had several children by him.

Cotton was buried at Landwade church in Cambridgeshire with his family raising a memorial to him in Madingley. His memorial by the monumental mason Flaxman was erected in the Cambridgeshire parish church.

== Notes ==
Military offices
Preceded by Lord Collingwood	Commander-in-Chief, Mediterranean Fleet; 1810–1811	Succeeded by Sir Edward Pellew
Baronetage of England
Preceded by John Hynde Cotton	Baronet (of Landwade); 1795–1812	Succeeded by St Vincent Cotton
