= Frances Gibson Shepheard Ingram =

English heiress and landowner (1734–1807)

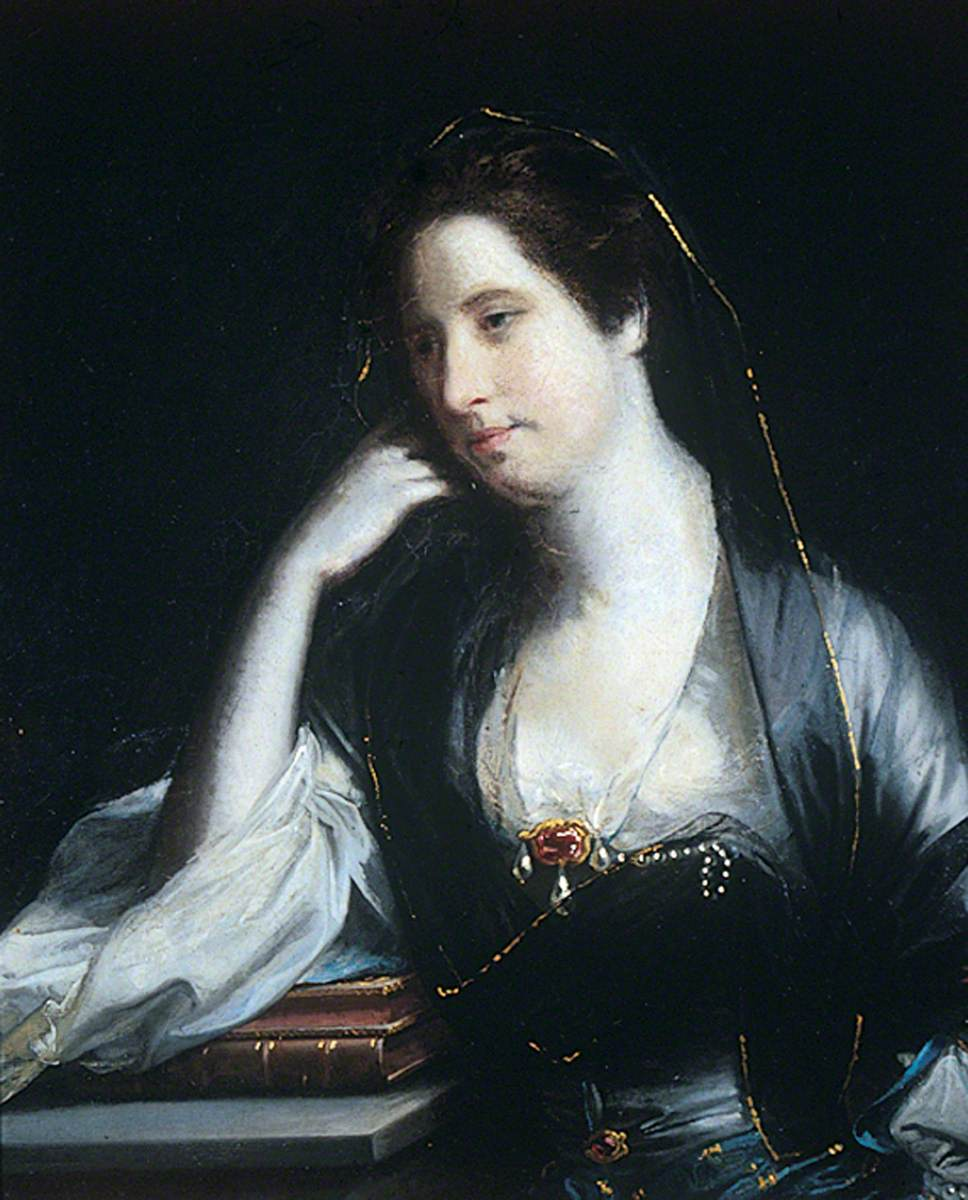
Portrait of the Viscountess Ingram, after Joshua Reynolds

Frances Gibson Shepheard Ingram (1734-1807), Viscountess Ingram, was a wealthy heiress and landowner who was instrumental in the design of the landscape at Temple Newsam, Leeds. Lady Ingram was the illegitimate daughter of the rich Tory merchant, Samuel Shepheard; her mother was called Gibson. Samuel left £40,000 in his will to Frances stating that she must not marry a peer, an Irishman or a Scotsman. She married Charles Ingram, 9th Viscount Irwin in 1758 after several years of legal dispute. Together they had five daughters, but no son. At their seat in Yorkshire, Temple Newsam, Lady Ingram insisted that Capability Brown redesign the parkland. She was an active gardener, supervising the planting in the grounds. For instance, surviving correspondence shows she helped her husband mark out where shrubs were to be planted along her gravel walk.

Lady Ingram collected works of art, including Italian classical landscapes. She was painted as a shepherdess by Benjamin Wilson, reflecting her interest in pastoral landscape. She was also painted by Joshua Reynolds in a pensive mood, leaning on a book, a copy of which is at Temple Newsam. As well as being a keen reader, she also directly supported writers such as Ann Gomersall, who dedicated her novels, Eleonora (1789), to Frances.

When Lord Ingram died in 1778, he left the Temple Newsam estate as well as eighty burgages in Horsham, Sussex to Lady Ingram. A resolute Tory, Lady Ingram used the burgages to dominate local politics by appointing members to the constituency and telling them how to vote; as well as controlling the local land court. She was challenged by the Whig 11th Duke of Norfolk who began buying up burgages; but Lady Ingram used her local knowledge and her tenacity to triumph over the Duke in a House of Commons hearing that ruled in her favour over the election of 1790. In 1796, she remodelled the south wing at Temple Newsam; and in 1806 the Prince of Wales visited her there giving her some Chinese wallpaper.
