= John Olmius, 1st Baron Waltham =

British landowner and Whig politician

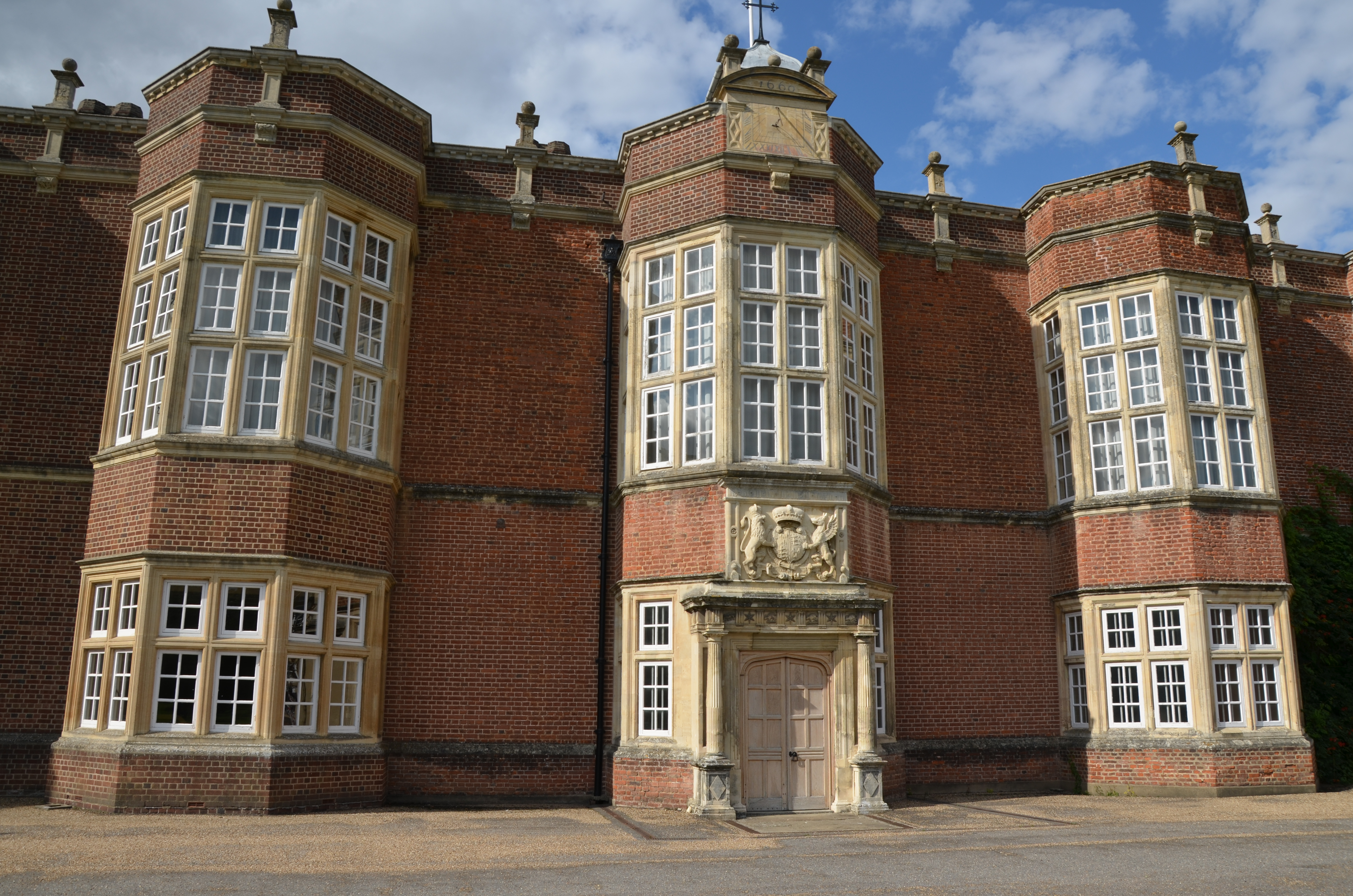
New Hall (or Palace of Beaulieu), Boreham

John Olmius, 1st Baron Waltham (18 July 1711 – 5 October 1762), of New Hall, Boreham, Essex, was a British landowner and Whig politician who sat in the House of Commons between 1737 and 1762.

== Background ==
Olmius was the only son of John Olmius, of Braintree, Essex, Deputy Governor of the Bank of England, and his wife Elizabeth Clarke, daughter and heiress of Thomas Clarke, a London merchant. He was the grandson of a wealthy Dutch merchant who had settled in England. He acquired New Hall near Boreham, Essex, in 1737.

== Political career ==
Olmius was returned to Parliament as one of four representatives for Weymouth and Melcombe Regis at a by-election on 10 March 1737. He was returned as MP for Colchester instead at the 1741 British general election but was unseated on petition on 26 February 1742. He was a supporter of Walpole and later Newcastle and Pelham. From 1746 to 1747 he was High Sheriff of Essex.

Olmius remained out of Parliament for twelve years, but at the 1754 British general election he was once again returned for Colchester. At the 1761 British general election, he was returned for Weymouth and Melcombe Regis for a second time. Olmius had applied to Lord Bute for an English peerage in the 1761 coronation honours but was overlooked. However, in June 1762, only four months before his death, he was raised to the Peerage of Ireland as Baron Waltham, of Philipstown in the King's County.

== Family ==
Lord Waltham married Anne Billers, daughter and heiress of Sir William Billers, of Thorley, Hertfordshire, Lord Mayor of London, in 1741. They had one son and a daughter. He died in October 1762, aged 51, and was succeeded in the barony by his only son, Drigue, on whose death in 1787 the title became extinct. Waltham's daughter and eventual heiress the Honourable Elizabeth Olmius married John Luttrell, later 3rd Earl of Carhampton, who later assumed the additional surname of Olmius in respect of his father-in-law.

Parliament of Great Britain
Preceded by Edward Tucker; Thomas Pearse; George Dodington; John Tucker	Member of Parliament for Weymouth and Melcombe Regis; 1737–1741; With: Thomas Pearse, George Dodington and John Tucker	Succeeded by John Tucker; Joseph Damer; John Raymond; James Steuart
Preceded by Matthew Martin; Jacob Houblon	Member of Parliament for Colchester; 1741–1742; With: Matthew Martin	Succeeded by Samuel Savill; Charles Gray
Preceded by Charles Gray; Richard Savage Nassau	Member of Parliament for Colchester; 1754–1761; With: Charles Gray 1754–1755; Isaac Martin Rebow 1755–1761	Succeeded by Isaac Martin Rebow; Charles Gray
Preceded by Welbore Ellis; Lord John Cavendish; George Dodington; John Tucker	Member of Parliament for Weymouth and Melcombe Regis; 1761–1762; With: John Tucker, Sir Francis Dashwood, Bt and Richard Glover	Succeeded by John Tucker; Sir Francis Dashwood, Bt; Richard Glover; Richard Jackson
Peerage of Ireland
New creation	Baron Waltham; June–October 1762	Succeeded by Drigue Olmius
