= Charles Gray (Colchester MP) =

English antiquary and politician

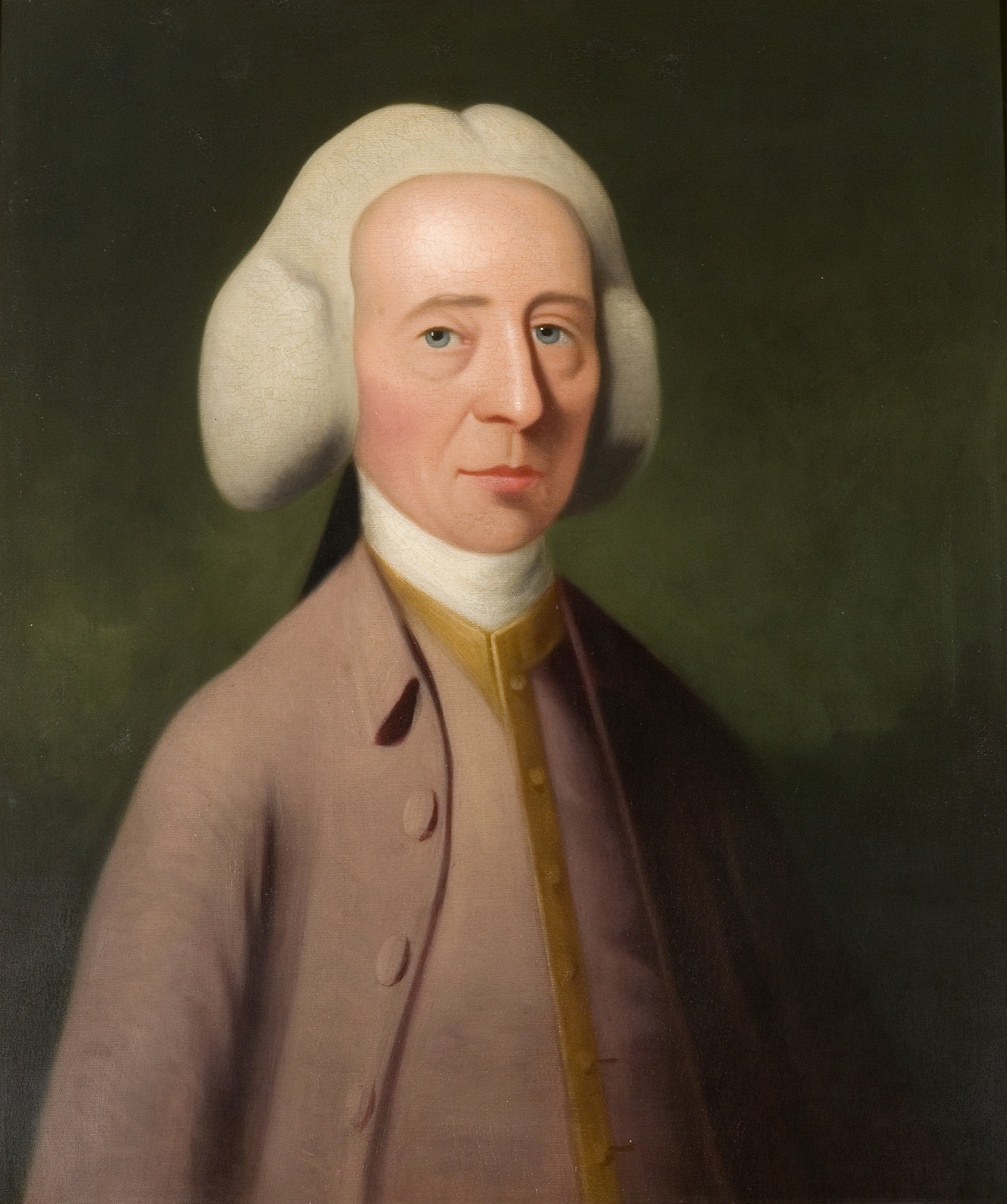
- Portrait of Gray now hanging in his former home.
- Born: Baptised 20 September 1696; Colchester, Essex, England
- Died: 12 December 1782 (aged 86); Colchester, Essex, England

Charles Gray FRS (baptised 20 September 1696 in Colchester, Essex, England – 12 December 1782) was a lawyer, antiquary and Tory Member of Parliament for Colchester.

Gray was baptised in 1696, the only son of George Gray, a glazier and local landowner, and his wife Elizabeth. He was educated at Colchester Royal Grammar School from 1702, before possibly spending some time at Cambridge University and entering Gray's Inn to become a lawyer in 1724. He was called to the bar in 1729 and became a bencher in 1737. Finally, he was elected a fellow of the Royal Society in 1754. In 1726 he married Sarah Creffield, née Webster, the well-off widow of Ralph Creffield, and after her death in 1751, in 1755 Gray married Mary, the daughter of Randle Wilbraham, Member of Parliament for Newton, Lancashire.

Gray's political career was a long one; he served in five parliaments from 1742 to 1755 and 1761–1780, during the reigns of George II and George III. By the end of his term, however, Gray was too ill to attend, being, in 1780, "too infirm and too ill to stand". "A classical scholar as well as a reformer, he was one of the original trustees of the British Museum."

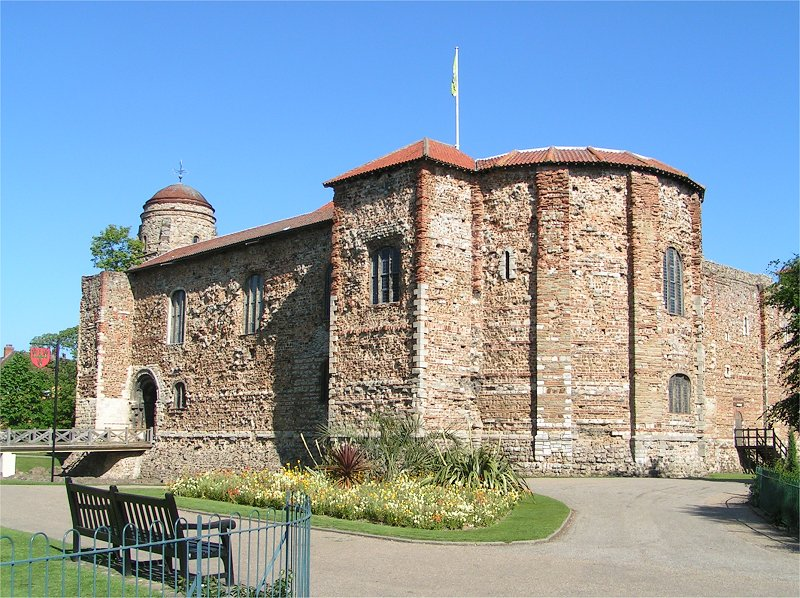
A modern image of Colchester Castle: Gray's Italianate tower is visible to the left hand side.

Locally, Gray is now most remembered for being given Colchester Castle as part of his marriage settlement, and subsequently making a number of efforts to preserve it for future generations. Likewise, he also purchased a great part of the surrounding land, which was, a hundred and fifty years later, given to the town to become Castle Park. In the castle itself he constructed the Italianate domed tower and the library, and founded in the latter, in 1750, the Castle Society Book Club: among the club's members was Philip Morant. The library was to contain the books of Samuel Harsnett, bequeathed to the town, and tended to and documented by Morant. He also roofed the castle in red tile, which survives. He was also responsible for management of a house, also part of his marriage settlement, which now forms Hollytrees museum, named after holly trees that Gray planted during his ownership of the building. The bulk of his estate was left to his friend James Round of Little Birch and his wife, Tamar, who was the daughter and heir of Gray's stepson, Peter Creffeild.

Parliament of Great Britain
Preceded by Matthew Martin; John Olmius	Member of Parliament for Colchester; 1742–1754; With: Samuel Savill 1742–47; Richard Savage Nassau 1747–54; John Olmius from 1754	Succeeded by Isaac Martin Rebow; John Olmius
Preceded by John Olmius; Isaac Martin Rebow	Member of Parliament for Colchester; 1761 – 1780; With: Isaac Martin Rebow	Succeeded by Sir Robert Smyth, Bt; Isaac Martin Rebow
