= Samuel Savill =

MP for Colchester

Member of Parliament for Colchester
- In office 1742–1747 Serving with Charles Gray
- Preceded by: John Olmius, 1st Baron Waltham; Matthew Martin
- Succeeded by: Richard Savage Nassau

Personal details
- Born: circa. 1700
- Died: 2 April 1763
- Spouse: Sarah Savill (née Husbands)
- Children: 2
- Parent: John Savill (father)

Samuel Savill (c. 1700 – 2 April 1763) was MP for Colchester from 1742 till 1747. He was the second son of John Savill, he married Sarah, the daughter of Edward Husbands and had two daughters.

== Parliamentary career ==
He became MP for Colchester in 1742 because an election petition overturned the original result. He consistently opposed the government in parliament, voting against the administration in all recorded divisions. In 1743, he was listed as a supporter of the House of Stuart in a letter sent to the French Government. He did not stand in 1747.
