= HMS Southsea Castle =

Five ships of the Royal Navy have borne the name HMS Southsea Castle, named after Southsea Castle on Portsea Island, Hampshire, England:

- HMS Southsea Castle (1696), a 32-gun fifth-rate frigate launched in 1696 at Redbridge. On 15 September 1697 she was wrecked on the coast of England near Hoylake.
- HMS Southsea Castle (1697), a 32-gun fifth-rate frigate launched in 1697 at Deptford Dockyard. On 12 November 1699 she was wrecked together with HMS Biddeford on Île-à-Vache off the coast of Hispaniola while sailing to Jamaica.
- HMS Southsea Castle (1708)
- HMS Southsea Castle (1724) built at Portsmouth by John Naish
- HMS Southsea Castle (1745)

== See also ==
- PS Southsea Castle (1930)
