= Sir Thomas Sclater, 1st Baronet =

English academic, landowner and politician

Sir Thomas Sclater Bt.
- Born: 9 July 1615; Halifax, Yorkshire
- Died: 10 December 1684 (aged 69)
- Occupations: Academic, landowner and politician

Sir Thomas Sclater, 1st Baronet (9 July 1615 – 10 December 1684) was an English academic, landowner and politician who sat in the House of Commons in 1659.

Sclater was the son of William Sclater of Halifax Yorkshire and was baptised at Halifax on the day of his birth. He was a Fellow of Trinity College, Cambridge University. He was incorporated BA at Oxford University from 1635 to 1636 and was awarded MA in 1639. He was created Doctor of Medicine in 1649 and was incorporated at Cambridge University in that year. In 1659, he was elected Member of Parliament for Cambridge University in the Third Protectorate Parliament. Following the Restoration, he was created baronet of Cambridge on 25 July 1660. He was High Sheriff of Cambridgeshire and Huntingdonshire from 1680 to 1681.

Sclater purchased Catley Park, south of Linton, and other estates in Cambridgeshire and built a mill at Hildersham. On his death the estates passed to his great nephew Thomas Sclater.

Sclater married on 25 February 1653 Susan Comber, widow of Thomas Comber, Master of Trinity College a daughter of Freston of Norwich. He died at the age of 69 without heirs so the baronetcy became extinct.

Parliament of England
Preceded by Richard Cromwell	Member of Parliament for Cambridge University; 1659; With: John Thurloe	Succeeded by Not represented in Restored Rump
Baronetage of England
New creation	Baronet (of Cambridge); 1660–1684	Extinct
