= St Vincent Cotton =

British sportsman and socialite

Sir St Vincent Cotton, 6th Baronet
- Born: 6 October 1801; Madingley Hall, Madingley, Cambridgeshire
- Died: 25 January 1863 (aged 61); Hyde Park Terrace, Kensington, London
- Resting place: Brompton Cemetery
- Occupations: Cavalry officer, sportsman and stagecoach driver

Sir St Vincent Cotton, 6th Baronet (6 October 1801 – 25 January 1863) was a British cavalry officer, sportsman, stagecoach driver and gambler, and the last of the Cotton baronets of Landwade.

Educated at Westminster School and Christ Church, Oxford, Cotton inherited his title from his father when he was ten years old. Although his father, grandfather, godfather, uncle and brother-in-law were admirals, and he was named after a naval battle, Cotton decided to join the army. After a brief career as a cavalry officer, he devoted the rest of his life to sport and gambling. He drove a London to Brighton stagecoach at one time, and was also a deputy lieutenant, militia captain, and magistrate for Cambridgeshire. Cotton married on his deathbed, and the baronetcy became extinct when he died.

== Early life ==
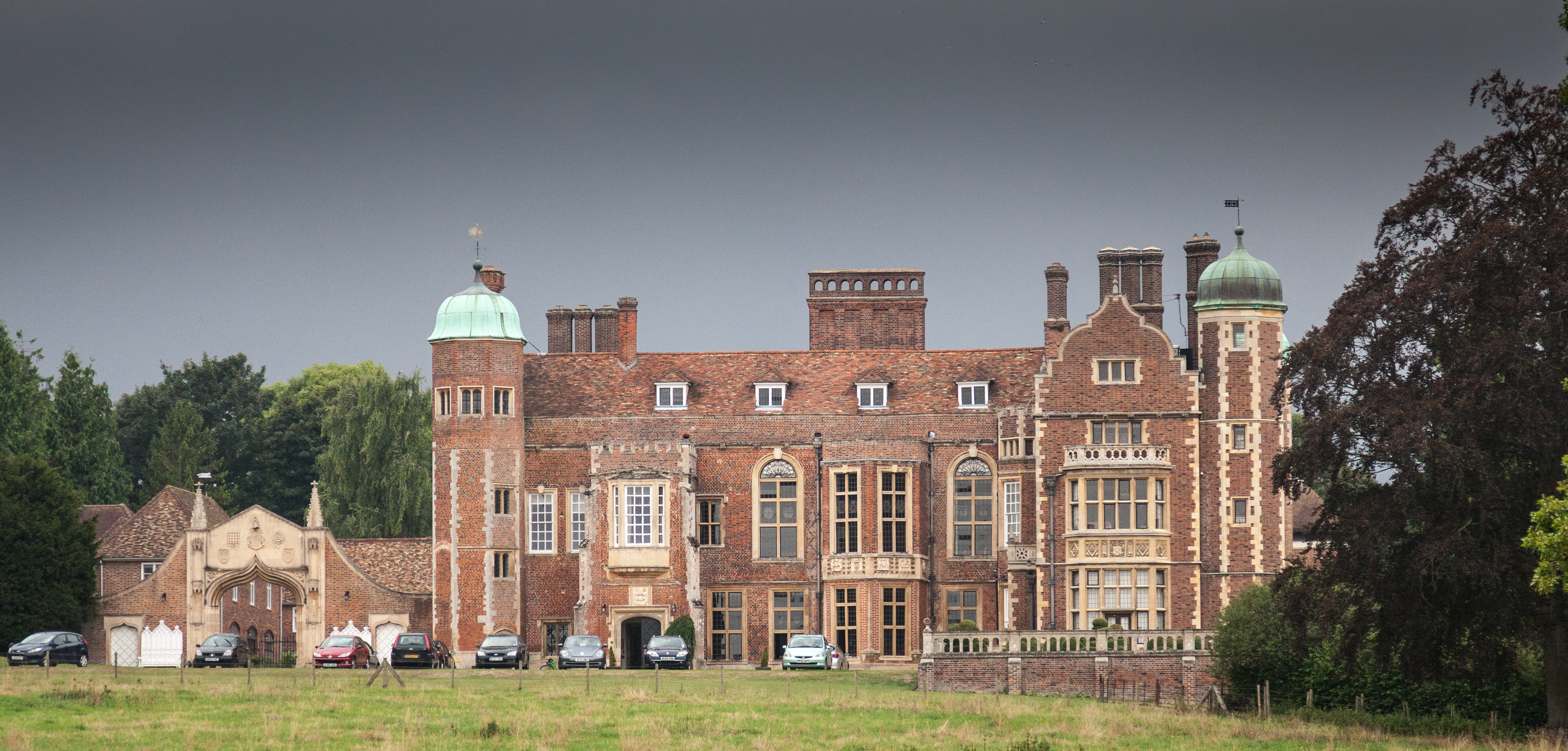
Madingley Hall

Cotton was born at Madingley Hall near Cambridge, and was the eldest surviving son of Sir Charles Cotton, 5th Baronet and Philadelphia Cotton (the daughter of Admiral Sir Joshua Rowley). Cotton's father was an admiral who saw active service during the American War of Independence, the French Revolutionary Wars and Napoleonic Wars and was unable to spend much time with his family at Madingley Hall. Cotton was named after his godfather, the Earl of St Vincent (who had taken his title from the Battle of Cape St Vincent). Cotton had an elder brother who had died in infancy, two elder sisters, Philadelphia and Maria, and a younger brother, Charles. In 1812 Cotton's father, who was by then commander-in-chief of the Channel Fleet, collapsed and died at Plymouth, and 10-year-old Cotton inherited the baronetcy. Cotton was educated at Westminster School and in 1820 enrolled at Christ Church, Oxford although he didn't graduate. In the summer of 1820, he toured Scotland on horseback with a cousin and a friend; the highlight of the tour was a visit to Fingal's Cave. Cotton's coming of age in October 1822 was celebrated by three days of festivities at Madingley. The following year he was appointed deputy lieutenant of Cambridgeshire and a captain in the Cambridgeshire Militia.

== Army career and sporting life ==
Although he came from a naval family, Cotton was happier on horseback or driving horses and decided to join a cavalry regiment, the 10th Hussars or Light Dragoons. He served in Portugal as a lieutenant but was retired on half-pay in 1830 after three years. On his return to England he took up a life of sport and gambling, and became a well-known figure at sporting events and Crockford's. He hunted in Leicestershire, played for the Marylebone Cricket Club, and attended race meetings and boxing matches where he was known as Vinny Cotton, Sir Vincent Twist, or the Baronet. On occasion he was involved in brawls and was once quoted as advising brawlers to "pitch into the big rosy men, but if you see a little lemon-faced nine-stone man, have nothing to do with him". In 1836, having lost much of his fortune at the gaming tables, he bought the Age stagecoach which ran between London and Brighton. Cotton drove the coach for two years, before his mother's ill health caused him to return to Madingley.

== Later life and marriage ==
In his later years, Cotton divided his time between his home in London and the Madingley estate. He was a magistrate for Cambridgeshire in the 1840s. Gambling debts forced him to sell or mortgage much of his property. After his mother's death in 1855, Cotton left Madingley and lived in London on a modest allowance from his sister. His health declined and he suffered a stroke which left him partially paralysed. He died on 25 January 1863, aged 61. The day before his death he married his mistress, Hephzibah Dimmick. Cotton was buried in Brompton Cemetery, where he was joined by his widow ten years later. With Cotton's death the baronetcy became extinct, his younger brother, a naval officer, having died in 1828 and his uncle and heir also having died before him. Contrary to what is sometimes said, the Madingley estate had not been completely gambled away, and went to Cotton's sister Maria who was married to Admiral Sir Richard King.

In his prime, 6 feet (1.8 m) tall and of athletic build, Cotton cut a fine figure of a man. His mother and sisters remained loyal to him through thick and thin, and his nephews enquired after "dear Uncle Vinney" when writing home from the Crimea War. After his death a magazine said that "for all his foibles and weaknesses a better-hearted fellow never breathed".

== Notes ==
Baronetage of England
Preceded by Charles Cotton	Baronet; 1812–1863	Extinct
