= Edmund Affleck =

Royal Navy officer (1725–1788)

Rear-Admiral Sir Edmund Affleck Bt
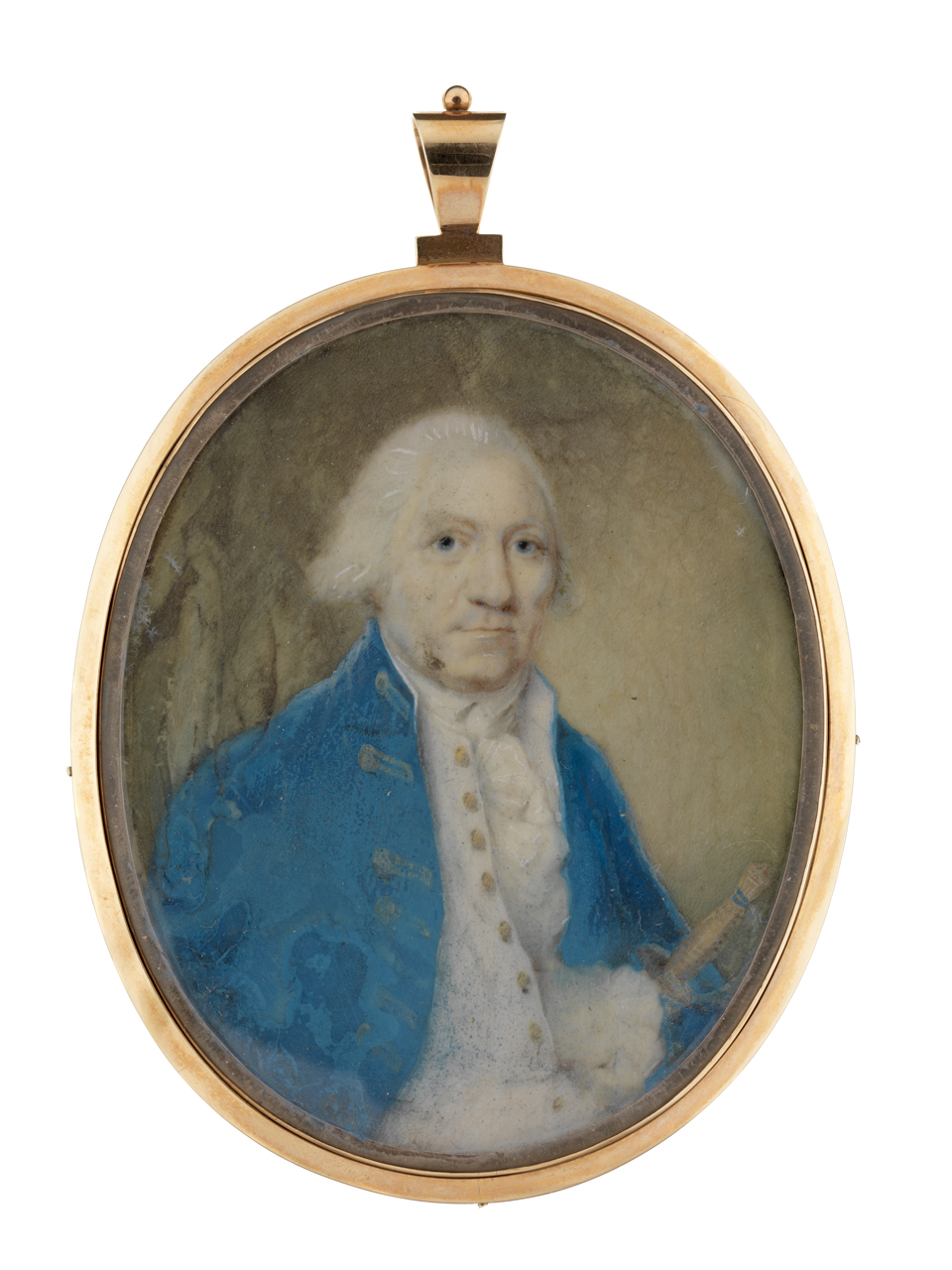
- c. 1787
- Born: 19 April 1725
- Died: 19 November 1788 (aged 63)
- Relatives: Philip Affleck (younger brother)
- Military career
- Allegiance: Great Britain
- Branch: Royal Navy
- Service years: c.1737–1782
- Rank: Rear-Admiral of the Blue
- Commands: HMS Bedford
- Conflicts: American War of Independence; Battle of Cape St. Vincent; Battle of St. Kitts; Battle of the Saintes
- Other work: MP for Colchester

Rear-Admiral of the Blue Sir Edmund Affleck, 1st Baronet (19 April 1725 – 19 November 1788) was a Royal Navy officer who served in the American War of Independence.

== Life ==
Affleck was born on 19 April 1725 the ninth son of the politician Gilbert Affleck (1684?–1764) of Dalham Hall. Affleck entered the navy at an early age, and during reign of George II, served in the several capacities of lieutenant, master and commander, and post captain. His first command of note was June 1756 when he took over HMS Albany.

In 1778 was given command of the 74 gun HMS Bedford and he briefly joined Vice-Admiral John Byron in North America before having to return for repairs. Affleck was with Sir Charles Hardy the following year before he was sent to relieve Gibraltar under the command of Sir George Rodney. Affleck's ship was noted for its ability to take the lead when attacking the Juan de Lángara's Spanish squadron during the Battle of St Vincent in 1780.

In 1781 he became a commodore and was briefly employed in New York, then being threatened by American rebels under George Washington. Surviving correspondence indicates Sir Edmund and General Washington to have been in contact regarding the treatment of prisoners of war. It was not, however, until the year 1782 had become – as it might be historically stated – a memorable epoch in the maritime annals of England, and that valour, ability, and boldness in battle, had retrieved for the nation its naval name, that opportunity had been afforded to Affleck to acquire celebrity and establish his professional fame.

About this period, his broad pennant (the commodore's symbol of office) was flying on board HMS Bedford, attached to the fleet then employed in the West Indies, under the orders of Sir Samuel Hood. In the Battle of St. Kitts which took place in Basse-terre Roads, between Hood and the Count de Grasse, it fell to the lot, or – as he would have said himself – good fortune of Affleck, who each day commanded the rear division of the British line, to sustain the brunt of the enemy's attack. His conduct on this occasion drew from the commander-in-chief, a public expression of praise.

"The enemy," says Sir Samuel, in his official dispatches, "gave the preference to Commodore Affleck, but he kept up so noble a fire, and was so well supported by his seconds, Captain Cornwallis and Lord Robert Manners, that the loss and damage sustained in those ships were very trifling, and they very much preserved the other ships in the rear."

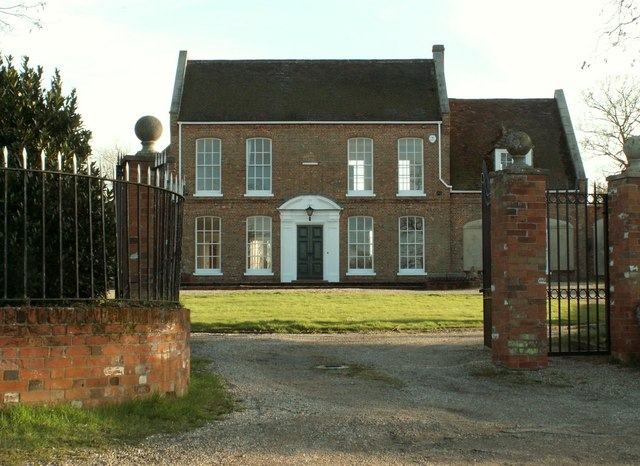
Fingringhoe Hall

For the services rendered to his country in this achievement, his sovereign conferred on him in 1782 the dignity of baronet of Britain; and out of compliment to his gallantry and general conduct, the electors of Colchester returned him the same year to represent that borough in parliament, which he did until his death. In turn, he attained his flag rank (in 1784), but in the capacity of admiral was never employed afloat.

In 1784 he bought Fingringhoe Hall in Essex. He died at his London house on 19 November 1788. He had married twice; firstly widow Hester Creffeild (née Hester Ruth) and secondly widow Margaret Smythies. He had only a daughter Charlotte and thus Fingringhoe Hall passed to the 2nd Baronet, Gilbert.

== See also ==
- Philip Affleck
- HMS Affleck

Parliament of Great Britain
Preceded by Sir Robert Smyth, Bt; Christopher Potter	Member of Parliament for Colchester; 1782–1788; With: Sir Robert Smyth, Bt 1782–1784, 1784–1788; Christopher Potter 1784	Succeeded by Sir Robert Smyth, Bt; George Tierney
Baronetage of Great Britain
New creation	Baronet (of Dalham Hall); 1782–1788	Succeeded by Gilbert Affleck
