= Ewan Affleck =

Canadian general practitioner

Ewan Affleck, CM is a family physician in Yellowknife, Northwest Territories, Canada. In 2013 he was named to the Order of Canada for his work in electronic medical records.
