= Thomas Sclater =

English lawyer and Tory politician

Thomas Sclater FRS (c. 1664 – 23 August 1736), later Thomas Bacon, was an English lawyer and Tory politician who sat in the House of Commons at various times between 1713 and 1736.

== Early life ==
Sclater was the son of Edward Sclater of Kingston-upon-Hull, Yorkshire and his wife Frances Thompson, daughter of Leonard Thompson, Lord Mayor of York. His father died when he was young and after 1673 he was brought up by his stepfather Edward Thompson. He was educated at St Paul's School and was admitted at Trinity College, Cambridge on 13 June 1682, aged 17. In 1684 he succeeded to the estates of his great-uncle Sir Thomas Sclater, 1st Baronet of Catley House, Cambridgeshire (south of Linton), "a large mansion", where he amassed a valuable library. In 1772 the estates had passed, by sale, to Edmund Keene, Catley House was pulled down soon after Keene's purchase and the remaining buildings were converted into a farm house.

== Career ==
He entered Gray's Inn in 1694 and was called to the bar in 1703. At the 1713 general election, Sclater was returned unopposed as Member of Parliament for Bodmin. He was made a freeman of Cambridge in 1714. At the 1715 general election, he was elected MP for Cambridge but was unseated on petition on 27 May 1715.

Slater married heiress Elizabeth Bacon on 22 May 1716. She had been a ward "under his charge", and was the heir of John Bacon, a rich London merchant who had purchased land at Little Paxton, Huntingdonshire. On the marriage, he assumed the additional surname of Bacon. He became a Fellow of the Royal Society in 1721.

At the 1722 general election as Bacon, he was returned unopposed as MP for Cambridge. He became a bencher of his Inn in 1724. He was elected MP for Cambridge in contests in 1727 and 1734.

== Death and legacy ==
Sclater/Bacon died childless worth £200,000 on 22 August 1736 at the age of about 71. His wife had died in 1726, which was after Sclater had made a will in 1724 leaving his estate for life to Sarah, the wife of his coachman whom he described as a ‘kinswoman’ with remainder to her two sons.

Elizabeth's will of 1724 left her personal fortune to her step-brothers after Thomas Sclater-Bacon's death. A monument to Elizabeth, by the eminent sculptor Joseph Wilton, was erected in the church of Linton St Mary's.

Parliament of Great Britain
Preceded by Francis Robartes; Russell Robartes	Member of Parliament for Bodmin; 1713–1715; With: Francis Robartes	Succeeded by Francis Robartes; John Legh
Preceded by Sir John Hynde Cotton, Bt; Samuel Shepheard	Member of Parliament for Cambridge; 1715; With: Sir John Hynde Cotton, Bt	Succeeded by Sir John Hynde Cotton, Bt; Samuel Shepheard
Preceded by Sir John Hynde Cotton, Bt; Samuel Shepheard	Member of Parliament for Cambridge; 1722–1736; With: Sir John Hynde Cotton, Bt 1722; Gilbert Affleck1722-1277; Sir John Hynde Cotton, Bt 1727-1736	Succeeded by Sir John Hynde Cotton, Bt; Gilbert Affleck
