= HMS Southsea Castle (1697) =

History

England
- Name: HMS Southsea Castle
- Namesake: Southsea Castle
- Ordered: 24 December 1696
- Builder: Deptford Dockyard
- Launched: 6 November 1697
- Commissioned: November 1697
- Fate: Wrecked on Île-à-Vache off the coast of Hispaniola, 12 November 1699

General characteristics
- Class & type: 32-gun fifth rate
- Tons burthen: 38771/94 tons (bm)
- Length: 108 ft 0 in (32.92 m) gundeck; 89 ft 9 in (27.36 m) keel for tonnage
- Beam: 28 ft 6 in (8.69 m)
- Depth of hold: 10 ft 9 in (3.28 m)
- Propulsion: Sails
- Sail plan: Full-rigged ship
- Complement: 145
- Armament: as built 32 guns; 4/4 × demi-culverins (LD); 22/20 × 6-pdr guns (UD); 6/4 × 4-pdr guns (QD)

HMS Southsea Castle was a 32-gun fifth rate built at Deptford Dockyard in 1694/95. She was assigned to the West Indies. She was wrecked along with HMS Bideford on Hispaniola in November 1699.

She was the second vessel to bear the name Southsea Castle since it was used for a 32-gun fifth rate built by Knowles of Redbridge on 1 August 1696 and wrecked on Dove Sand on 15 September 1697.

== Construction and specifications ==
She was ordered on 24 December 1696 to be built at Deptford Dockyard under the guidance of Master Shipwright Fisher Harding. She was launched on 6 November 1697. Her dimensions were a gundeck of 108 feet 0 inches (32.92 metres) with a keel of 89 feet 9 inches (27.36 metres) for tonnage calculation with a breadth of 28 feet 6 inches (8.69 metres) and a depth of hold of 10 feet 9 inches (3.28 metres). Her builder's measure tonnage was calculated as 38771/94 tons (burthen).

The gun armament initially was four demi-culverins (Note: A demi-culverin was a gun of 3,400 pounds with a four-inch bore firing a 9.5-pound shot with an eight-pound powder charge.) on the lower deck (LD) with two pair of guns per side. The upper deck (UD) battery would consist of between twenty and twenty-two 6-pounder guns (Note: A 6-pounder was a Dutch gun used to replace the saker.) with ten or eleven guns per side. The gun battery would be completed by four 4-pounder guns (Note: A minion renamed the 4-pounder was a gun of 1,000 pounds with a 3.5-inch bore firing a 4-pound shot with a 4-pound powder charge.) on the quarterdeck (QD) with two to three guns per side.

== Commissioned service 1698-99 ==
She was commissioned in 1697 under the command of Captain Thomas Swanson. In 1699 Captain Thomas Stepney was assigned as her commander for service at Jamaica.

== Loss ==
She was wrecked along with HMS Bideford on Île-à-Vache, off the coast of Hispaniola, on 12 November 1699.
