= Philip Affleck =

Royal Navy Admiral (c. 1726 – 1799)

Admiral Philip Affleck
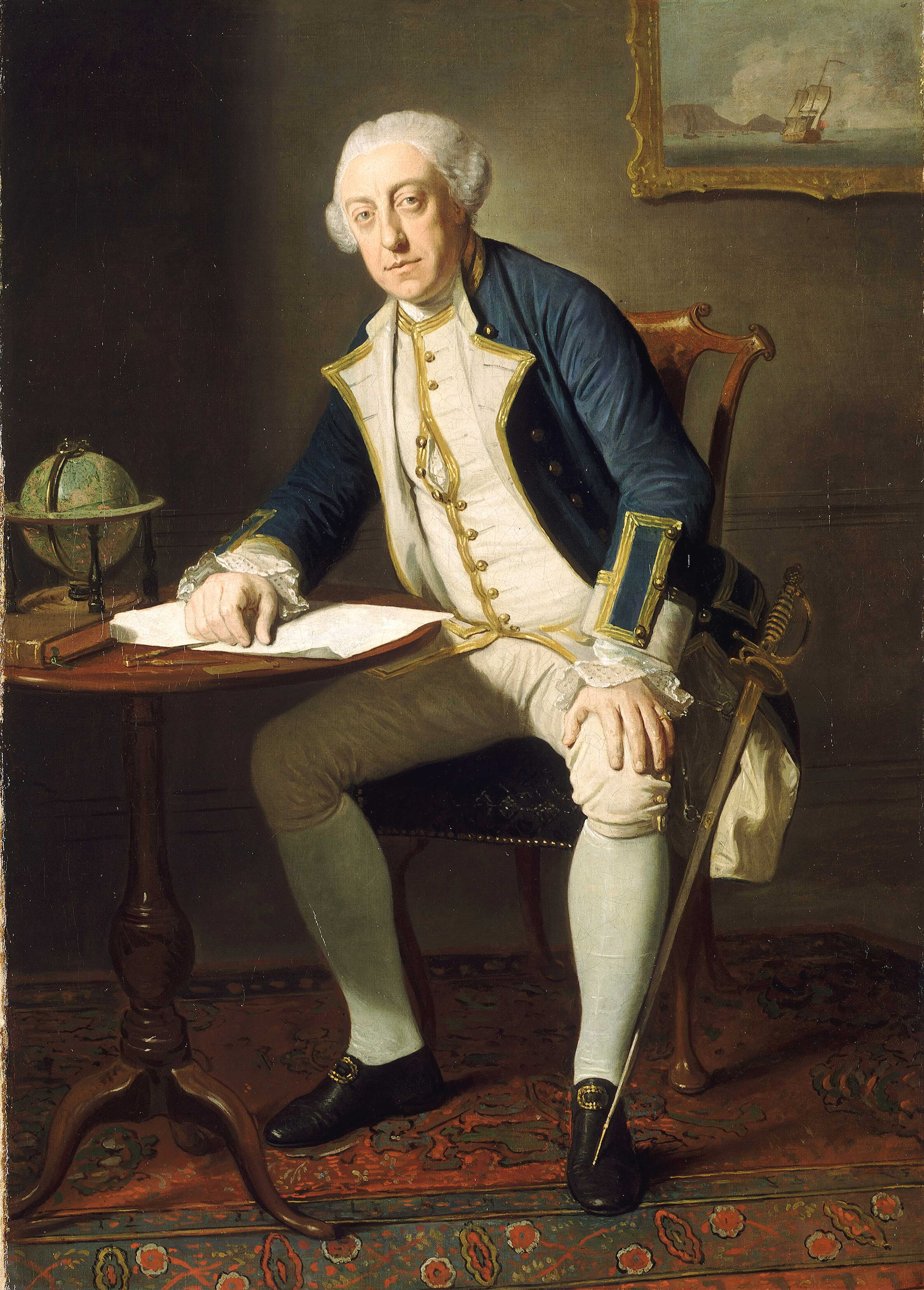
- Portrait of Philip Affleck, Admiral of the White by Edward Penny, 1767
- Born: c. 1726; Dalham Hall, Dalham, Suffolk
- Died: 21 December 1799 (aged c. 73); Bath, Somerset
- Relatives: Edmund Affleck (older brother)
- Military career
- Allegiance: Great Britain
- Branch: Royal Navy
- Service years: 1755–1796
- Rank: Admiral of the White
- Commands: HMS Triumph HMS Namur; HMS Gramont; HMS Panther; HMS Southsea Castle; HMS Triumph Commander in Chief Jamaica Station
- Conflicts: French and Indian War; Siege of Louisbourg; Battle of Lagos

Admiral Philip Affleck (c. 1726 – 21 December 1799) was a Royal Navy officer. He was the younger brother of Sir Edmund Affleck. Affleck held various commands throughout the latter half of the 18th Century, most notably as commander-in-chief of the Jamaica Station and as a Lord of the Board of Admiralty. Early in his career he fought at the Siege of Louisbourg where he was promoted commander after carrying out a successful cutting-out mission. He was promoted to post-captain a year later after impressing Admiral Edward Boscawen during the Battle of Lagos.

Later in his career he joined Admiral Sir George Rodney in the West Indies and took part in the capture of Sint Eustatius. Between 1790 and 1792 he held the position of commander-in-chief of the Jamaica Station and between 1793 and 1796 he held his position as a Lord of the Board of Admiralty. Although his career was marked with long periods of inaction and unemployment Admiral Affleck was known as a good officer and was well respected by his peers.

== Early career ==
Affleck began his nautical career in the service of the East India Company. He joined the navy at an undetermined date and was promoted acting-lieutenant in 1755. As a lieutenant he served either in the sloop-of-war HMS Hunter or the bomb ketch HMS Aetna although as his brother Edmund was serving at almost exactly the same time the records are a little unclear. At the Siege of Louisbourg he distinguished himself in leading the boats that cut out the French men-of-war Prudente and Bienfaisant and was promoted to command. His promotion to commander was confirmed on 1 August 1759 and Affleck accompanied Edward Boscawen in the 18-gun sloop of war HMS Gramont to the Mediterranean. In Gramont Affleck took part in the Battle of Lagos where he impressed Boscawen to such a degree that the admiral promoted Affleck to post-captain with the effective date of 28 August 1759 and put Affleck in command of the flagship HMS Namur. On his return to England he was assigned to HMS Panther and sent to India. During the blockade of Pondicherry on 1 January 1761 Panther was dismasted in a hurricane and once more Affleck impressed his superiors by his calm handling of the situation. In May 1761 he exchanged command of Panther with Captain Newsom to command the storeship HMS Southsea Castle but resigned command of her in early 1762. He then became captain of HMS Baleine, which the British had captured some two years earlier at Pondicherry. Not long thereafter he returned to England.

== HMS Triumph and the West Indies ==
In 1779 he was appointed captain of HMS Triumph in the Channel Fleet. In the spring of 1780 Affleck was sent to the West Indies to reinforce Admiral Rodney. He missed the Battle of Martinique in April of that year but was present with Rodney once more at the capture of Saint Eusatia and Saba the following February. He returned to England in 1781 and was on the beach until April 1783 when the Thunderer was recommissioned to be the guard ship in Portsmouth. He commanded her until July 1784 when his brother Edmund took over temporary command. Affleck remained unemployed until 24 September 1787 when he was appointed rear-admiral of the blue Squadron. In 1790 he was made commander-in-chief of the Jamaica Station.

== Lord of the Admiralty ==
He returned to England in 1792 and was promoted in early 1793 to vice-admiral of the blue squadron. In April of that year he was appointed as one of the Lords of the Admiralty under John Pitt, Earl of Chatham. 11 April 1794 he was promoted to vice admiral of the white, 4 July 1794 vice admiral of the red, 1 June 1795 admiral of the blue and on 14 February 1799 to the rank of admiral of the white.

== Retirement and death ==
Affleck retired from his seat on the Board of the Admiralty in 1796 and lived quietly and privately at his home in Bath. He died at his home on 21 December 1799. The Naval Chronicle said of him that he was "Universally respected as an officer, as a gentleman, and as a christian."

The Earl of Sandwich commented on Affleck that he was "very respectable and thoroughly right headed".

== Sources ==
- Cundall, Frank (1915). Historic Jamaica. West India Committee.

Military offices
Preceded by Alan Gardner	Commander-in-Chief, Jamaica Station; 1790–1793	Succeeded by John Ford
