= Christopher Potter (MP) =

- Born: 1750; England
- Died: November 18, 1817 (aged 66–67); London, England
- Occupations: Manufacturer, contractor
- Known for: Introducing transfer printing on porcelain and glass to France
- Office: Sheriff of Cambridgeshire and Huntingdonshire

Christopher Potter (1750–1817) was an English manufacturer and contractor, best known for introducing into France the method of printing on porcelain and glass.

== Early life ==
Christopher Potter was born in 1750 the first son of George and Betty Potter. He was baptised on 1 January 1751; his elder sister, Philliss, was baptised in 1749 and buried in 1751; his younger sister, Mary, baptised in February 1752; and a brother, George baptised in November of the same year. Nothing is known of Christopher's education. His father George was a maker of Archel dye at the Falcon Steps, Southwark between 1749 and 1755. When Christopher was four years old his father purchased the White House, Bethnal Green, a madhouse, from Eleanor Wright the widow of the original owner. The family appear to have moved to live there since George and Betty appear in various records in day-to-day management of the madhouse. There was a later suggestion that, in addition to running the madhouse, Betty Potter kept "a common boarding house, on Bethnal Green" and that their son Christopher "usually" ran "Errands, for" his "Mother's Boarders, for hire." It is possible that one of the adjacent properties was used in this way for part of the Potter's occupation of the madhouse. His father also, at some time, set up an archel dye factory on adjacent land. Trade directories list him as an Archel maker at Bethnal Green from 1768 and going into partnership with Joseph Dent from 1771. In the year after Christopher's mother Betty's death in August 1762, his father took a partner, James Stratton, in the madhouse business. Following his father's death in October 1771 it appears that Christopher sold his interest in the madhouse to Stratton but retained his partnership in the Archel dye factory. He married Sarah Mills on 16 January 1773 and settled in Bethnal Green at some distance removed from both madhouse and factory. Whilst at Bethnal Green, the couple had two children, Sarah Maria, born November 1774, and Thomas Mills, born January 1776. His Bethnal Green house was put up for sale in July 1778 but by then the family had already moved to their new home, Great Barns, an estate near Ely, Cambridgeshire, nine hundred acres of which he devoted to growing woad. At first his property was cultivated by "woadmen", who were accustomed to hiring fields for two years; but then he employed his own agricultural labourers, which he considered an innovation. In 1780 the family took a house in Parliament Street, Westminster where, on 29 March 1782, their third child George Thomas was born.

== Political career ==
He was appointed Sheriff of Cambridgeshire and Huntingdonshire in 1778. On 10 January 1778, Lord North, the Prime Minister wrote to John Montagu, 4th Earl of Sandwich, First Lord of the Admiralty, describing Christopher Potter as “… a gentleman of business and of very fair character in the City, and a good friend to Government upon all occasions…”

In 1780, he unsuccessfully contested the parliamentary representation of Cambridge. In 1781, he was returned for Colchester but on petition was unseated for corrupt practices.

During the final years of the American War of Independence, Potter was one of the principal victualling contractors for the British Army and the principal supplier of Ship's bisket (bread), flour and many other provisions to the British Navy. Together with his partner Aaron Moody, he established the first steam-powered corn mill and bakery in the world in 1781 at Chapel Mill, Southampton.

In 1783, at the end of the war, Potter set up a chain of bakeries in London to supply the city with cheap bread, much to the consternation of the Baker's Company. He must have overstretched himself for on 15 April 1783, he was declared bankrupt, and all of his properties were sold off to help clear his debts

In 1784 Potter had the support of Richard Rigby, and he was again returned for the Colchester seat, but the election was declared void, and had to be re-run. Potter then lost. It has been suggested that his candidature seems to have laid the ground for the passing of an act disqualifying government contractors, but that seems unlikely as Clerks Act, which restricted anyone holding a government contract from sitting as an MP, was passed in 1782.

== In France ==
In 1788 Potter left England to make a new career in France. Settling in Paris, Potter in 1789 established potteries there, and assumed credit for the introduction of transfer printing on porcelain and glass to France, acknowledging that the discovery of the technique had been made in England some 20 years before. Backed by a favourable report from two members of the Academy of Sciences and by Sylvan Bailly, the mayor of Paris, he petitioned the National Assembly for a seven years' patent, promising to give a fourth of the profits to the poor, and to teach his process to French apprentices. No action was taken on his petition, but he enjoyed for years a virtual monopoly. He also reopened the Chantilly porcelain works, which had been closed through the emigration of the Condé family; he there employed five hundred men, and produced nine thousand dozen plates a month. He opened further potteries at Montereau and Forges-les-Eaux. In the autumn of 1793, when the English in France were arrested as hostages for Toulon, he was imprisoned at Beauvais and Chantilly.

In 1796 he was the bearer to Lord Malmesbury at Paris of an offer from Barras to conclude peace, for a bribe of £500,000. At the industrial exhibition of 1798 on the Champ de Mars, the first held in Paris, he was awarded one of the twelve major prizes for white pottery. At the exhibition of 1802 he was one of the twenty-five gold medallists who dined with Napoleon Bonaparte. By this time he had given up all his factories except that at Montereau, which lasted through the 19th century.

John Goldworth Alger, writing in the Dictionary of National Biography, stated that no specimen remains of Potter's ordinary ware. The Victoria and Albert Museum, however, has Chantilly porcelain it identifies with the Potter period. In the Sèvres Museum there was a cup, ornamented with designs of flowers and butterflies, with his initials, surmounted by Prince of Wales's feathers. In 1811 he advocated the cultivation of woad in France, citing his Cambridgeshire experience, and between 1794 and 1812 he took out five patents for agricultural and manufacturing processes, some of them in association with his son, Thomas Mille Potter.

== Death ==
In March 1815, when Napoleon Bonaparte returned from the island of Elba, Potter, already weakened by age and infirmities, wanted to leave France temporarily. He retired to England, where his infirmities only increased. His eldest son Thomas Mills Potter, with whom he had collaborated on his later French patents, died on 19 December 1815 at Nonsuch Park, the home of their family friend Samuel Farmer. On 16 June 1817 Potter failed to attend Westminster court for a Lawsuit initiated by Charles Brunsdon, a London merchant, for a debt of £1,200. He was arrested by the sheriff and held in Westminster Gaol. On 14 July at a Hearing at the Court of Common Pleas he was committed to the Fleet Prison where he died on 18 November 1817. He was buried at St Matthew's, Bethnal Green on 24 November 1817 Obituaries noted that 'he could calculate by memory alone with a promptitude that astonished the beholder, and at the same time with a degree of precision, that could only be equalled by the slow and painful operations of the counting-house' and 'He possessed an extensive memory .... His researches in mechanical and chemical science, if not profound, rendered the common powers of both prompt and useful for various purposes to which he skilfully applied them. He was too eccentric and speculative to hoard a fortune; and in that respect may be likened to the man who heapeth up riches and cannot tell who shall gather them.'

== Sources ==
This article incorporates text from a publication now in the public domain: Lee, Sidney, ed. (1896). "Potter, Christopher (d.1817)". Dictionary of National Biography. Vol. 46. London: Smith, Elder & Co.
