= Dalham Hall =

Country house in Dalham, Suffolk, England

Coordinates: 52.2352°N 0.5235°E

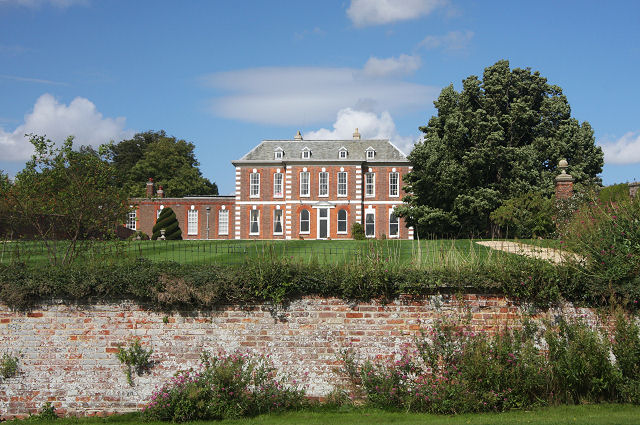
Dalham Hall

Dalham Hall is a country house and 3,300-acre (13 km^{2}) estate, located in the village of Dalham, Suffolk, near Newmarket, and 13 kilometres (8 mi) west of Bury St Edmunds.

Owners of the Dalham estate have included:

- c.1050-1240 Peche Family
- 1240-1320 English Crown Estate (from 1303, Margaret of France, Queen of England)
- 1320-1362 Walter de Norwich, followed by his son John de Norwich (died 1362)
- 1362-1417 various joint-owners, including Robert Scales, 5th Baron Scales
- 1417-1697 Stuteville Family
- 1697-1702 Sir Gilbert Dolben, 1st Baronet
- 1702-1714 Bishop Simon Patrick and his eponymous son
- 1714-1901 Affleck Family, including Gilbert Affleck and John Affleck
- 1901-1928 Rhodes Family, including Cecil Rhodes and Frank Rhodes
- 1928-2009 Philipps Family
- 2009–present Sheikh Mohammed bin Rashid Al Maktoum

The manor was not the principal residence of any family until acquired by the Stutevilles, the first of whom is likely to have established Dalham Hall. Simon Patrick (1626–1707), the Bishop of Chichester (1689–1691) and Bishop of Ely (1691–1707), purchased this estate at Dalham in December 1702, and commissioned the building of the present Dalham Hall. John Affleck Esq. acquired the estate from the Bishop's son in 1714.

After remaining in Affleck's family (the Affleck baronets) for nearly 200 years, in 1901, the estate was bought by Cecil Rhodes, on the evidence of photographs, and tales of its game shooting prowess. After Rhodes died in 1902, before taking possession, his brother Francis William Rhodes and his family inherited the hall, and erected a hall in the village in Cecil Rhodes' memory.

The estate was bought in 1928 by Laurence Philipps, a shipping magnate who established what became known as the Dalham Hall Stud. The house was three storeys high until a serious fire of 1954, when the top floor was removed and the roof reconstructed.

In 1981 Major Jim Philipps sold the stud to Sheikh Mohammed bin Rashid Al Maktoum, the Ruler of Dubai and Prime Minister of the United Arab Emirates. After the major died in 1984, the rest of the estate was held in trust by his heirs until July 2009, when it was sold for £45 million to Sheikh Mohammed via estate agents Bidwells. The Hall is listed Grade II on the National Heritage List for England.
