= Sir John Cotton, 2nd Baronet =

English politician

Sir John Cotton, 2nd Baronet (circa. 1648 – 15 January 1713) was an English politician and peer.

He sat as MP for Cambridge from 1689 till 1695, 8 November 1696 till 1702 and 1705 till 1708.

He was the first son of Sir John Cotton, 1st Baronet and Jane, the daughter of Edward Hynde. He was educated at Trinity College, Cambridge. He married Elizabeth, the daughter of Sir Joseph Sheldon on 14 January 1679 and had 2 sons and 8 daughters.

He succeeded his father as baronet on 25 March 1689.
