= Gilbert Affleck =

British politician (died 1764)

Gilbert Affleck (c. 1684 – 12 November 1764), of Dalham Hall, Suffolk, was a British Tory politician who sat in the House of Commons between 1722 and 1741.

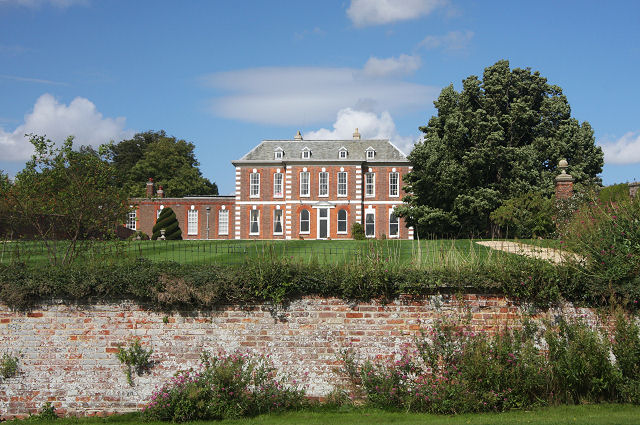
Dalham Hall

Affleck was the eldest surviving son of John Affleck, of Fort St. George, India, and his wife Nealtie Schape, daughter of Gilbert Schape, merchant of Amsterdam. He matriculated at Christ Church, Oxford on 6 February 1702, aged 17. On 3 November 1705, he married Anna Dolben, daughter of John Dolben of Finedon, Northamptonshire and Elizabeth Mulso, at Westminster Abbey, London. He succeeded his father to Dalham Hall in 1718.

Affleck was returned as Tory Member of Parliament (MP) for Cambridge at a by-election on 25 October 1722 on the interest of his cousin, Sir John Hynde Cotton, Bt. He did not stand at the 1727 British general election and was out of parliament for ten years. He decided to stand again for Cambridge at a by election in 1737 with the support of Samuel Shepheard, in opposition to another Tory candidate put forward by Cotton. Cotton had lost favour with the corporation by this time, and Affleck was returned as MP on 10 February 1737. He did not stand at the 1741 general election.

Affleck died on 12 November 1764, aged 79. He and his wife had twelve sons and six daughters. His second and eldest surviving son John sat also in the Parliament of Great Britain, while his tenth son Edmund was a rear-admiral in the Royal Navy. His daughter Mary was the mother of William Danby (1752-1833) the writer.

== Collections ==
University College London holds over 4000 tracts in its Lansdowne and Halifax tracts collections, including material owned by Affleck. The tracts were published in England between 1559 and 1776, and relate to the union between England and Scotland, the Civil War and the Restoration. Many of the tracts were written by Daniel Defoe and Jonathan Swift under pseudonyms.

Parliament of Great Britain
Preceded by Thomas Bacon; Sir John Hynde Cotton, Bt	Member of Parliament for Cambridge; 1722–1727; With: Thomas Bacon	Succeeded by Thomas Bacon; Sir John Hynde Cotton, Bt
Preceded by Thomas Bacon; Sir John Hynde Cotton, Bt	Member of Parliament for Cambridge; 1737–1741; With: Sir John Hynde Cotton, Bt	Succeeded by Viscount Dupplin; James Martin
