= Affleck Castle =

15th century castle in Angus, Scotland

- Monikie, Angus
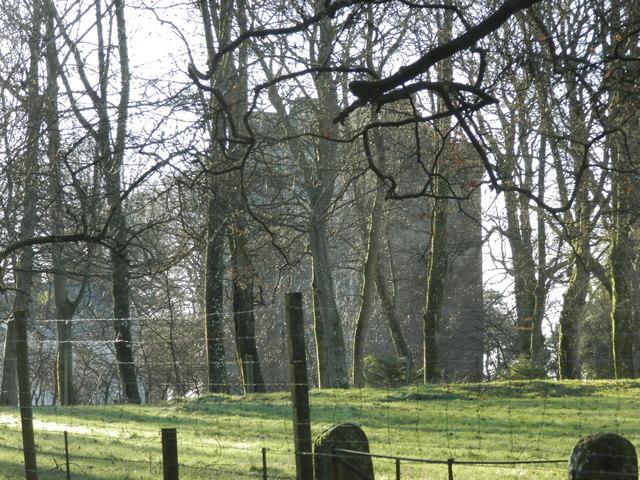
- The castle in 2014

Location
- Coordinates: 56.53855°N 2.82437°W

Scheduled monument
- Official name: Affleck Castle
- Type: Secular: castle
- Designated: 23 November 1987
- Reference no.: SM90007

Affleck Castle, also known as Auchenleck Castle, is a tall L-plan tower house dating from the 15th century, 4 miles (6.4 km) north of Monifieth and 1 mile (1.6 km) west of Monikie Parish Church, Angus, Scotland. It is a scheduled monument. It is not open to the public.

== History ==
The castle was built on the lands of the Auchenlecks of that Ilk held since 1471. From the mid-17th century it belonged to a family of Reids, who forfeited the castle in 1746 because of their activities as Jacobites. It has not been occupied since 1760, when a new mansion was built.

== Structure ==
Affleck Castle is a well-preserved free-standing rectangular tower of four storeys and a parapeted garret. It is 60 feet (18 m) tall, and has thick rubble walls, with several mural rooms. A few steps down from the entrance is the basement, which is sub-divided.

The hall, which is on the first floor, has a vaulted ceiling; this supports a withdrawing room. Above the main staircase is an entresol bedroom, almost 7 feet (2.1 m) square, reached by an eleven-step staircase in the east wall. The stairs lead from the hall. The withdrawing room has a spy-hole into the hall below. This would have allowed all movement to the main turnpike stair to be observed. The room has window seats, wall closets, and a shafted fireplace. A step up from this room leads to a circular oratory, equipped with aumbry, piscine, holy-water stoup and stone candle-holders. This room is also vaulted. There is a bedroom in each of the upper floors.

A projection by the door, with a square cap-house, houses the stair, and there is a square turret over the south-west angle. There are two devices for dropping missiles or liquids on attackers: one over the arched door; and the other on the west front, while the ground floor is equipped with gun loops.
