= Affleck baronets =

Title in the Baronetage of Great Britain

- Escutcheon of the Affleck baronets of Dalham Hall
- Creation date: 1782
- Status: extinct
- Extinction date: 1939
- Seat: Dalham Hall
- Motto: Pretiosum quod utile, What is useful is valuable
- Arms: argent three bars sable goutty d'eau, in chief two ears of wheat vert

The Affleck Baronetcy, of Dalham Hall in the County of Suffolk, was a title in the Baronetage of Great Britain. It was created on 10 July 1782 for the naval commander Edmund Affleck. The title became extinct on the death of the eighth Baronet in 1939.

== Affleck baronets, of Dalham Hall (1782) ==
- Sir Edmund Affleck, 1st Baronet (1725–1788)
- Sir Gilbert Affleck, 2nd Baronet (1740–1808)
- Sir James Affleck, 3rd Baronet (1759–1833)
- Sir Robert Affleck, 4th Baronet (1763–1851)
- Sir Gilbert Affleck, 5th Baronet (1804–1854)
- Sir Robert Affleck, 6th Baronet (1805–1882)
- Sir Robert Affleck, 7th Baronet (1852–1919)
- Sir Frederick Danby James Affleck, 8th Baronet (1856–1939)

== The decline and extinction of the Affleck baronetcy ==
The seventh baronet lost money through fraudulent dealings by a firm of solicitors and sold Dalham Hall and its estate in 1901 to Cecil Rhodes to raise £100,000.

The 8th baronet, Frederick Danby James Affleck, was born with no expectation of inheriting the title and emigrated to Queensland, Australia as a cadet with the P&O shipping line. He unexpectedly inherited the title after the death of his cousin, the seventh baronet, in 1919. Frederick Affleck was involved in numerous business ventures in Queensland but lost all his money. He died, poor and blind, on 24 July 1939 at the Dunwich Benevolent Asylum on North Stradbroke Island in Queensland and was buried in Toowong Cemetery in Brisbane.

Frederick Affleck's eldest son, Frederick James Siddartha Affleck (born 1905 in Wynnum, Brisbane), was a habitual criminal and at the time of his father's death in 1939 was in Boggo Road Gaol in Brisbane, along with his younger brother Dalham Robert Affleck, serving a four-year sentence for robbery and blackmail.

Although Frederick senior and Frederick junior wanted Frederick junior to inherit the title from his father, Frederick junior and his siblings were illegitimate. Although Frederick senior claimed to have married Elizabeth Annie (Lily) Ross in 1904, at that time she was married to (but separated from) her first husband Lionel Laurence Green. Frederick senior and Lily did not marry until 1918 after Lily believed Green to have died. However, Green had not died, so this was not a legal marriage. Shortly before his death, on 21 June 1939, with Green definitely dead, Frederick senior and Lily married again and then re-registered the births of their children which, under Queensland law, made their children legitimate as their parents were now legally married. After Frederick senior's death, Lily applied on behalf of her imprisoned son for him to inherit the title. On 22 June 1949, the Attorney General declared that English law did not recognise Queensland's subsequent legitimacy of the birth as being sufficient to inherit the title. As there were no other living heirs, the title became extinct.

== Other relatives ==
Admiral Philip Affleck, brother of the first Baronet, was also a distinguished naval commander.

Baronetage of Great Britain
| Preceded by Palk baronets | Affleck baronets of Dalham Hall; 10 July 1782 | Succeeded by Brisco baronets |
