= 1741 in art =

Events from the year 1741 in art.

== Events ==
- At the request of the new Empress Elizabeth of Russia, painter Ivan Nikitich Nikitin begins his journey back from exile in Tobolsk to Saint Petersburg but dies en route.
- Charles-Joseph Natoire produces a series of cartoons for the Gobelins tapestries History of Mark Anthony.
- A major collection of Old Master drawings and other material from the collection of Pierre Crozat (died 1740) is auctioned in Paris; the catalogue written by Pierre-Jean Mariette is the first modern descriptive sale catalogue.

== Works ==
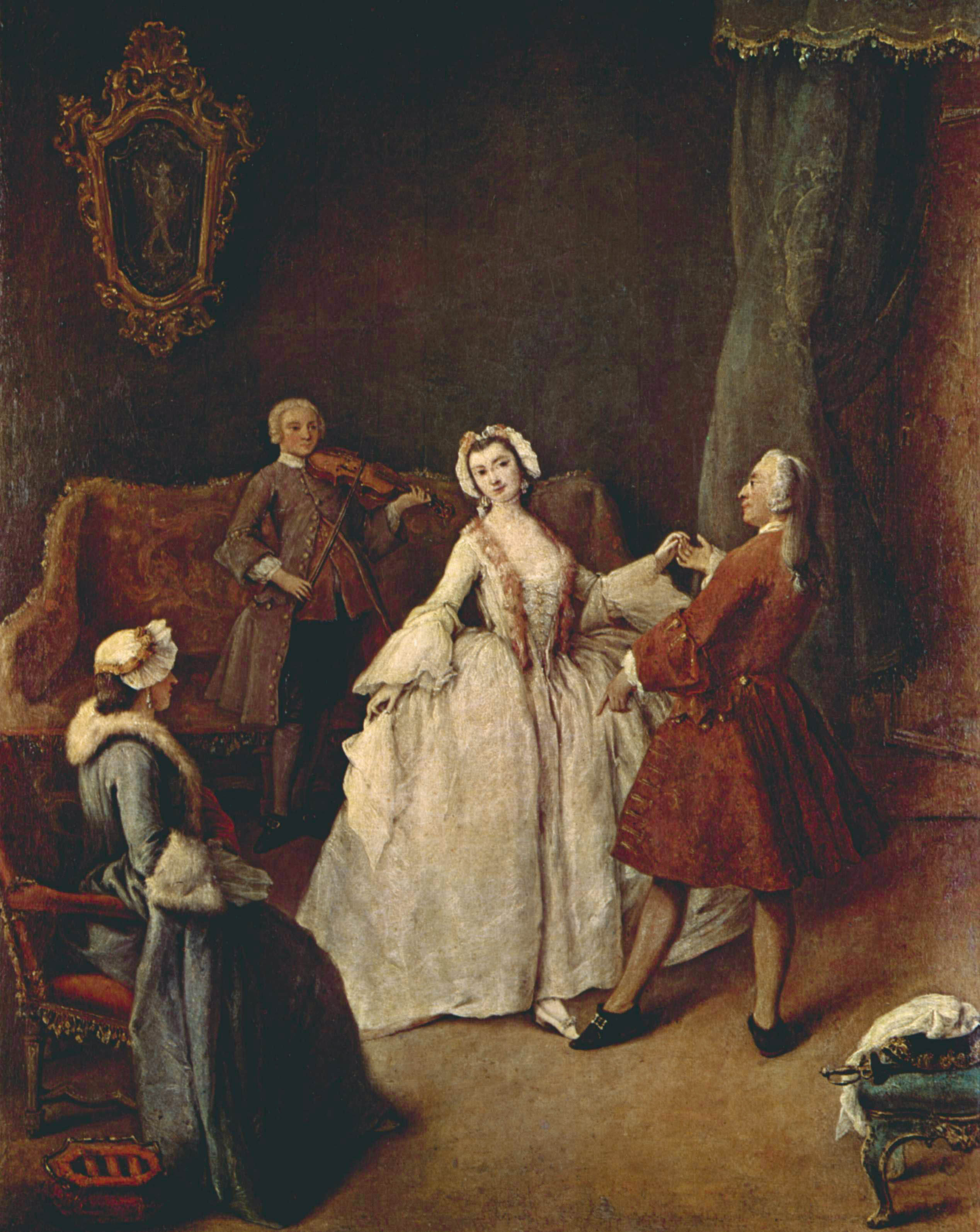
Longhi – La lezione di danza

- William Hogarth – Portrait of Benjamin Hoadly
- Pietro Longhi – La lezione di danza
- Michele Marieschi – Magnificentiores Selectioresque Urbis Venetiarum Prospectus (engravings)
- Martin van Meytens – Portrait of Francis I, Grand Duke of Tuscany

== Births ==
- February 7 – Henry Fuseli, Swiss-born British painter, draughtsman, and writer on art (d. 1825)
- March 1 - Johann Georg Edlinger, Austrian court painter (died 1819)
- March 18 – Alexander Kucharsky, Polish portrait painter (died 1819)
- March 20 – Jean-Antoine Houdon, French neoclassical sculptor (died 1828)
- March 26 – Jean-Michel Moreau, French illustrator and engraver (died 1814)
- April 15 – Charles Willson Peale, American painter, soldier and naturalist (died 1827)
- October 11 – James Barry, Irish painter (died 1806)
- October 30 – Angelica Kauffman, Swiss-Austrian painter (died 1807)
- November 18 - Carlo Antonio Porporati, Italian engraver and painter (died 1816)
- date unknown
  - Eliphalet Chapin, American furniture designer (died 1807)
  - François-Anne David, French line-engraver (died 1824)
  - Cornelius Høyer, Danish miniature painter (died 1804)
  - Thomas Hickey, Irish painter of portraits and genre scenes (died 1824)
  - Wojciech Kucharski, Polish sculptor and mason (died 1819)
  - James Nixon, English miniature-painter (died 1812)
  - Mette Magrete Tvistman, Danish clockmaker (died 1827)
  - Johann Dallinger von Dalling, Austrian painter (died 1806)

== Deaths ==
- February 15 - Georg Rafael Donner, Austrian sculptor (born 1693)
- February 19 – Andrea Locatelli, Italian painter of landscapes (vedute) (born 1695)
- March 8 - Étienne-Jehandier Desrochers, French engraver (born 1668)
- April 17 – Onofrio Avellino, Italian painter of the Baroque period (born 1674)
- May 16 – Jacob Christoph Le Blon, German painter and engraver who invented the system of three- and four-colour printing (born 1667)
- June 6 – Giuseppe Maria Mazza, Bolognese sculptor of the Rococo period (born 1653)
- July 8 – Pietro Paltronieri, Italian painter of quadratura (born 1673)
- November – Giovanni Antonio Pellegrini, Venetian decorative and mural painter (born 1675)
- date unknown
  - Giacomo Adolfi, Italian painter of the Baroque period, active in and around Bergamo (born 1682)
  - Giovanni Antonio Capello, Italian painter of the late-Baroque period, active in Brescia (born 1669)
  - Pedro de Uceda, Spanish Baroque painter (born unknown)
  - Ivan Nikitich Nikitin, Russian painter of portraits and battle scenes (born 1690)
  - Alexey Zubov, Russian etcher (born 1682)
