= 1816 in art =

Events in the year 1816 in Art.

== Events ==
- February 5 – The bequest of the art collection of the 7th Viscount FitzWilliam to the University of Cambridge in England leads to the foundation of the Fitzwilliam Museum.
- March 21 – In Paris, the Académie de peinture et de sculpture (founded in 1648) is merged with the Académie de musique (1669) and the Académie royale d'architecture (1671) to form the Académie des Beaux-Arts.
- June – The Elgin Marbles are purchased by the British government from Thomas Bruce, 7th Earl of Elgin, for the British Museum in London. (→ British Museum Act 1816)
- 26 October – Penance from Nicholas Poussin's first of two Seven Sacraments painting cycles owned by the Duke of Rutland is destroyed by fire at Belvoir Castle in Leicestershire, England.

== Works ==
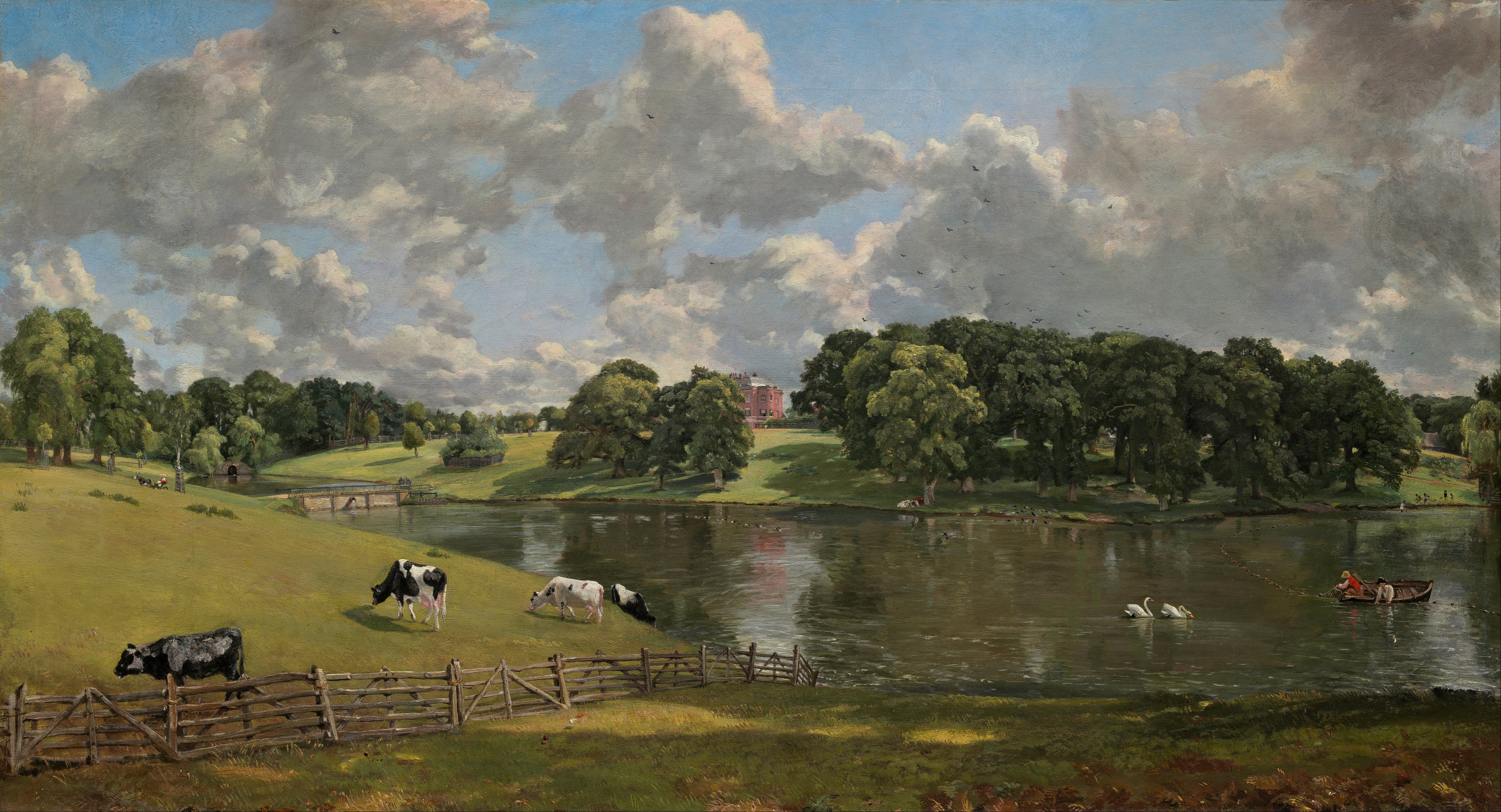
Wivenhoe Park by John Constable.

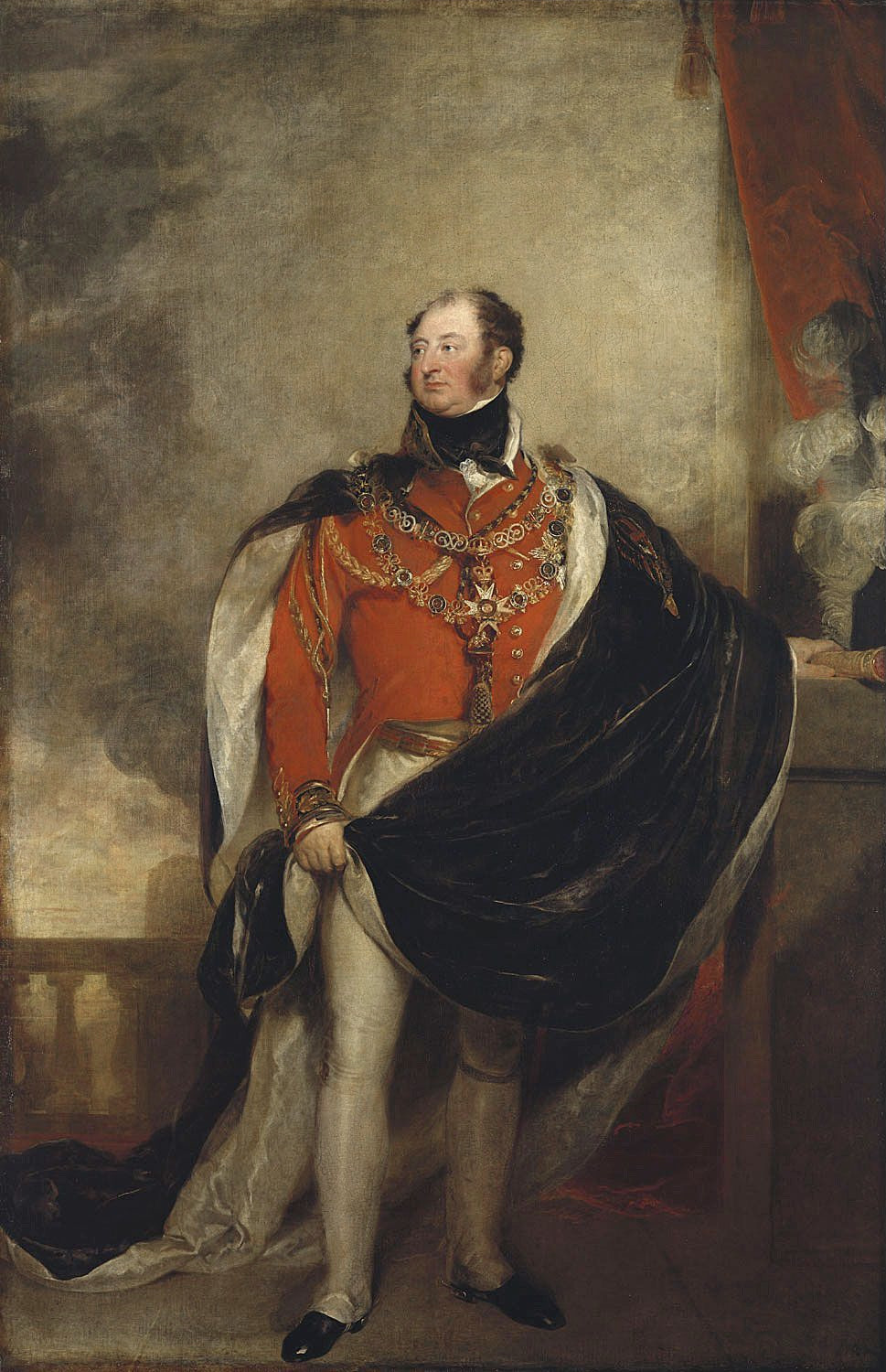
Portrait of the Duke of York by Thomas Lawrence.

- Cádiz Memorial (London)
- Edward Bird
  - The Arrival of King Louis XVIII of France at Calais
  - The Embarkation of Louis XVIII at Dover
- Augustus Wall Callcott – The Entrance to the Pool of London
- John James Chalon – Napoleon on board the Bellerophon
- John Constable
  - The Quarters Behind Alresford Hall
  - Portrait of Maria Constable
  - The Wheat Field
  - Wivenhoe Park
  - Weymouth Bay from the Downs above Osmington Mills
- Jacques-Louis David – Portrait of Étienne Maurice Gérard
- Arthur William Devis – Eliza O'Neill as Belvidera
- Pavel Đurković – Portrait of Vuk Karadžić
- Girodet – Portrait of Jacques Cathelineau
- Francisco Goya
  - The Duke of Osuna
  - Unfortunate events in the front seats of the ring of Madrid, and the death of the Mayor of Torrejón (etching)
- Antoine-Jean Gros – Portrait of the Duchess of Angoulême
- Pierre-Narcisse Guérin – Portrait of Henri de la Rochejaquelein
- Charles Robert Leslie – Portrait of John Quincy Adams
- John Linnell – Portrait of Richard Trevithick
- John Martin – Joshua Commanding the Sun to Stand Still upon Gibeon
- Rolinda Sharples – The Artist and her Mother
- William Mulready – The Fight Interrupted
- Horace Vernet
  - The Battle of Somosierra
  - The Death of Prince Poniatowski

== Births ==
- February 22 – Thomas Gambier Parry, English artist and art collector (died 1888)
- March 18 – Antonio Salviati, Italian glassmaker (died 1890)
- May 24 – Emanuel Leutze, German American painter (died 1868)
- date unknown – Paul Emile Chappuis, French-born photographer (died 1887)

== Deaths ==
- January 15 – Ludwig Guttenbrunn, Austrian painter (born 1750)
- February 19 – Margareta Alströmer, Swedish painter and singer and a member of the Royal Swedish Academy of Arts (born 1763)
- June 12 – Yves-Marie Le Gouaz, French engraver (born 1742)
- June 16 – Carlo Antonio Porporati, Italian engraver and painter (born 1741)
- July 7 – Francis Towne, English water-colour painter (born 1739)
- July 11 – Philippe-Laurent Roland, French sculptor (born 1746)
- July 23 – William Alexander, English painter, illustrator and engraver (born 1767)
- August 4 – François-André Vincent, French painter (born 1746)
- August 7 – François-Joseph Duret, French sculptor (born 1732)
- August 13 – Pehr Hilleström, Swedish painter and teacher (born 1732)
- August 26 – Robert Fagan, Irish painter, diplomat and archaeologist (born 1761)
- date unknown
  - Henri Auguste, Parisian gold- and silversmith (born 1759)
  - Christian Gottlob Fechhelm, German portrait and historical painter (born 1732)
  - François-Guillaume Ménageot, French painter of religious and French historical scenes (born 1744)
