= Bryan Thomas (architect) =

British architect (1928–2023)

- Born: 28 November 1928; India
- Died: 19 December 2023 (aged 95)
- Education: Architectural Association School of Architecture
- Occupation: Architect
- Years active: 1957–2019
- Spouses: Pauline Venton (m. 1954; div. 1973) Wendy Foster (m. 1975; died 2021)
- Children: 4
- Buildings: House at Beth Chatto Gardens
- Website: www.bryanthomas.org.uk

Bryan Keith Thomas (28 November 1928 – 19 December 2023) was an English architect in Essex, known for domestic architecture in that county such as the house at Beth Chatto Gardens in Elmstead Market. His church architecture included Church of England, Christian Scientist and Quaker places of worship.

== Early life ==
Bryan Keith Thomas was born in British India on 28 November 1928. He spent his early years between India and Felixstowe, Suffolk, where he attended preparatory school.

== Career ==
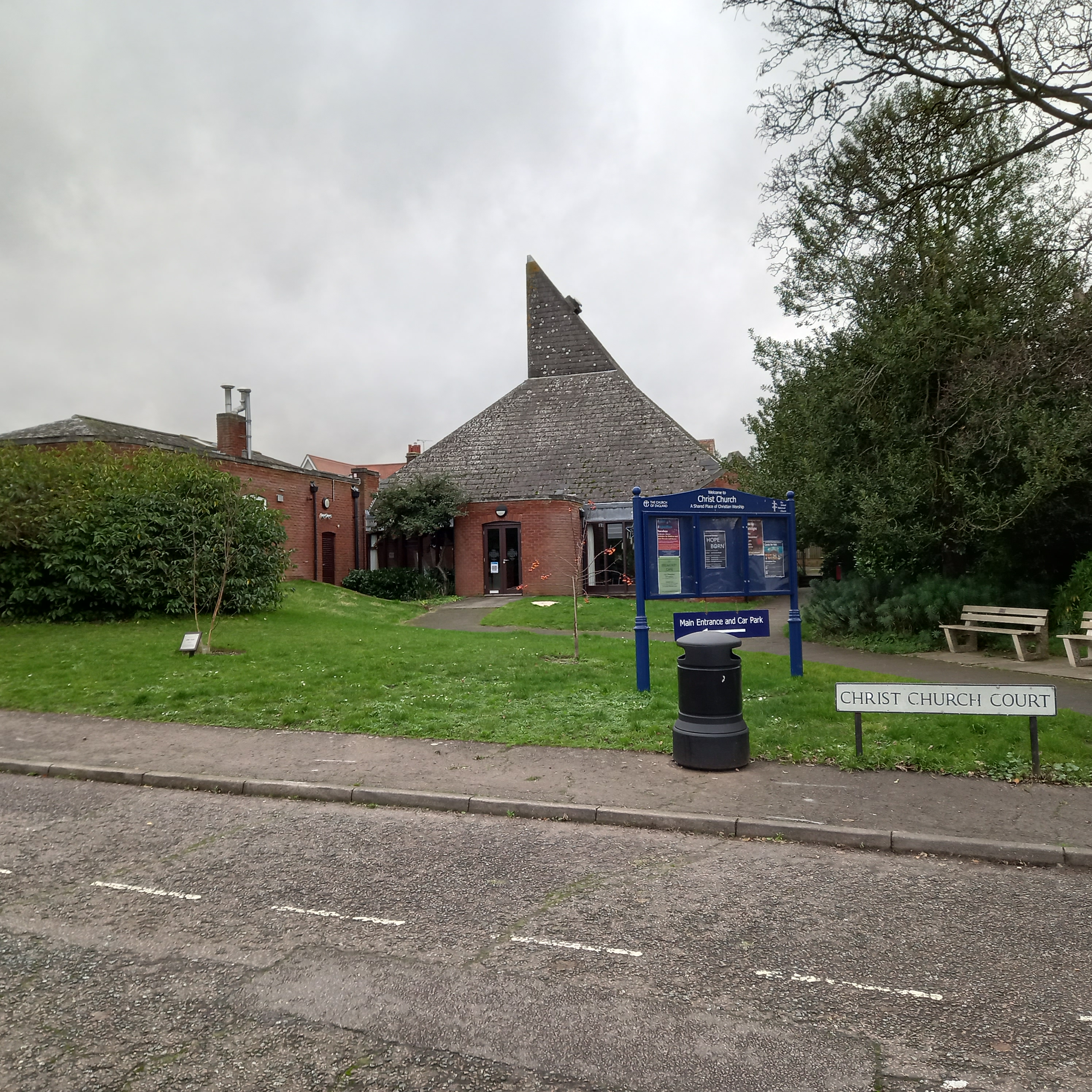
Christ Church, Ireton Road, Colchester, completed in 1978.

Thomas trained at the Architectural Association from 1945 to 1950 before working with David Stern and subsequently with the modernist architect Wells Coates and his partner Michael Lyell. As his family were centred around Colchester and the Mersea Island, he moved to north Essex in 1955 where he established his own practice in Colchester in 1957.

Thomas's domestic architecture includes the house at Beth Chatto Gardens (1960), the House on the Heath, Fordham Heath (1967, extended 1974), as well as a number of other houses in Essex. Due to the length of time that Thomas practised, he returned to a number of his houses to update or expand them such as one in Fingringhoe that he originally designed in 1964.

His church architecture included a Friends meeting room for the Quakers (1968), St Andrew and St Peter Church, Alresford (1975–76), First Church of Christ Scientist, Colchester (1975–77), and Christ Church, Ireton Road, Colchester (1978).

In addition, he designed rides and restaurants for Alton Towers, leisure complexes at Blackpool Pleasure Beach, shelters for the elderly and schools such as St Osyth Church of England Primary School. He received a commendation in The Sunday Times British Homes Award in 2013, before retiring at age 91 in 2019.

== Personal life ==
Thomas' first marriage was to Pauline Venton, with whom he had four sons. His second wife, Wendy Foster, died in 2021. Thomas died on 19 December 2023, at the age of 95.

== Notable works ==
Notable works by Thomas include:

- House at Beth Chatto Gardens, Elmstead Market, 1960.
- House on the Heath, Fordham Heath, 1967, extended 1974.
- St Andrew and St Peter Church, Alresford, 1975–76.
- First Church of Christ Scientist, Colchester, 1975–77.
- Christ Church, Ireton Road, Colchester, 1978.
- University of Essex's health clinic.
- Wivenhoe House extension, in 1987–88. Here, he added a 40-bed extension.

== See also ==
- Churches in Colchester
