= Kucharski =

Kucharski (Polish pronunciation: [kuˈxarski]; feminine: Kucharska) is a Polish surname of multiple origins. It may be a toponymic surname derived from a place named Kuchary (disambiguation). It may be derived from the occupation of cook (kucharz) or from the nickname Kucharz. Outside of Poland it may also be spelled "Kucharsky". It may refer to:

- Alexander Kucharski (1741–1819), Polish portrait painter
- Cezary Kucharski (born 1972), Polish footballer
- Dawid Kucharski (born 1984), Polish footballer
- Honorata Kucharska (born 2002), Polish chess master
- Jaiden Kucharski (born 2002), Australian soccer player
- Józef Kucharski (1910–1944), Polish footballer
- Kazimierz Kucharski (1909–1995), Polish athlete
- Leszek Kucharski (born 1959), Polish table tennis player
- Sebastian Kucharski, Polish bass guitarist
- Ted Kucharski (1907–1992), American football player
- Tomasz Kucharski (born 1974), Polish rower
- Wojciech Kucharski (1741–1819), Polish sculptor and mason
