= Wivenhoe House =

18th century house in Essex, England

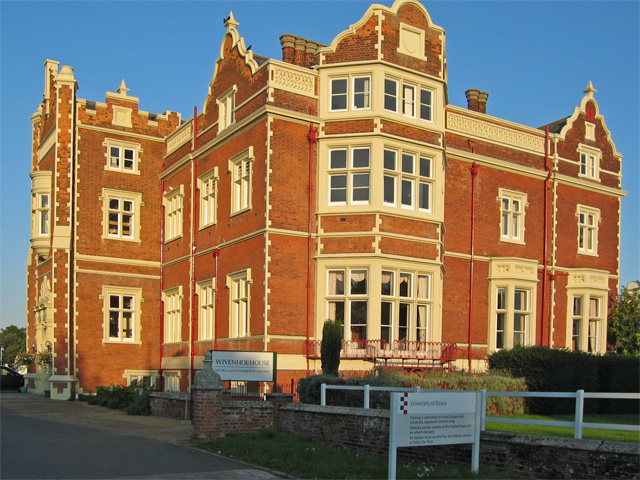
- Wivenhoe House
- Interactive map of the Wivenhoe House area

General information
- Location: Wivenhoe Park, Colchester, Essex, CO4 3SQ
- Coordinates: 51°52′42.8″N 0°57′6.9″E
- Management: University of Essex and The Edge Hotel School

Design and construction
- Architect: Thomas Reynolds

Other information
- Number of rooms: 40
- Number of restaurants: 1
- Parking: On Site

Website
- www.wivenhoehouse.co.uk

Wivenhoe House is a grade II-listed house located in Colchester, Essex. It is in use as a 4-star hotel.

== History ==
Wivenhoe House's history began in 1759 when Isaac Rebow asked Thomas Reynolds to build the house. In 1816, owner Major-General Francis Slater Rebow commissioned John Constable to commit the house to canvas for the fee of 100 guineas. The painting, Wivenhoe Park, is now displayed at the National Gallery of Art in Washington, D.C.

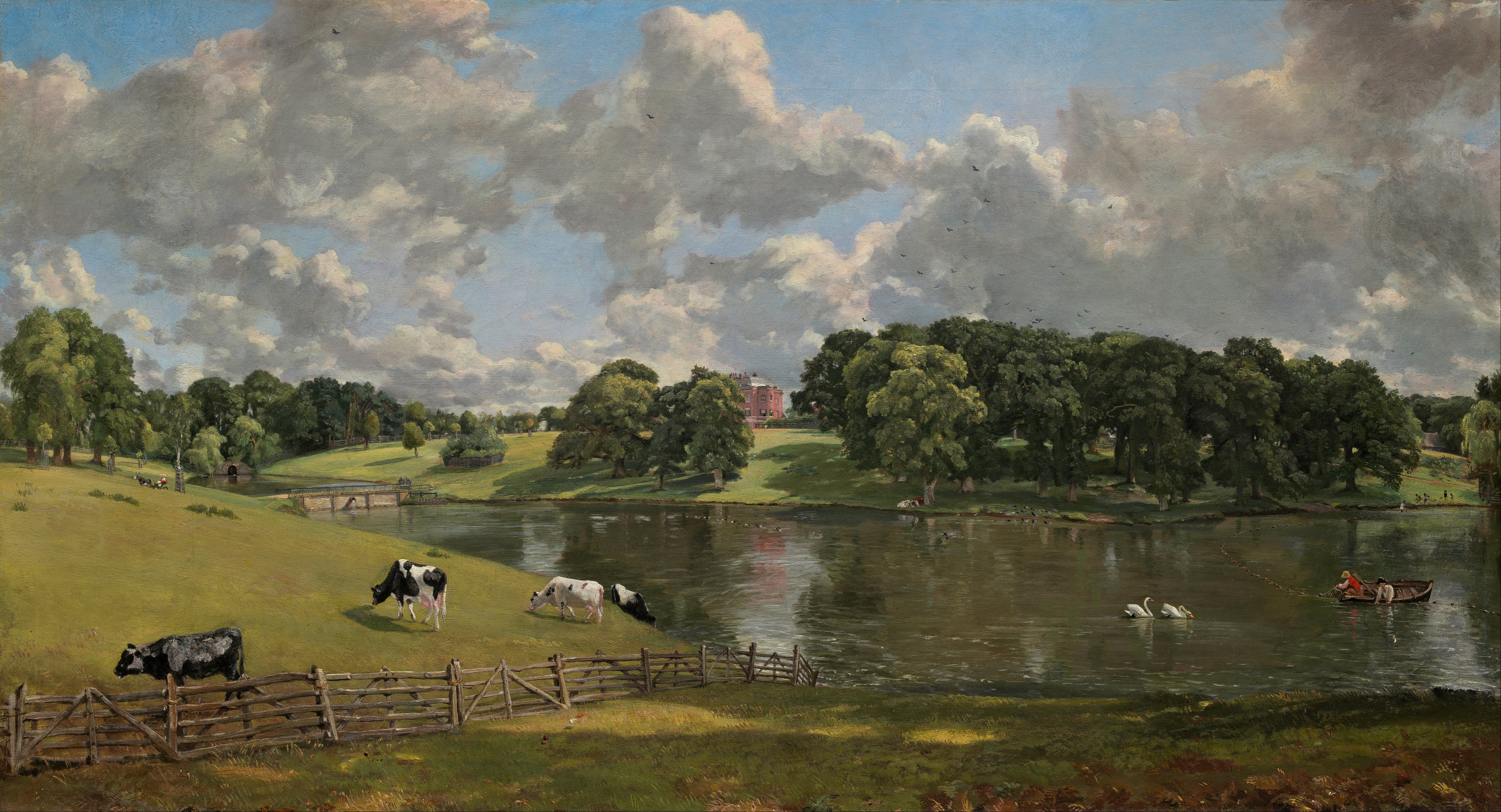
Wivenhoe Park, by John Constable, 1816.

This was the same General Rebow who returned from the Peninsular Wars with two cork oak cuttings in his boots. Today, those two oak trees stand proudly within the grounds.

When General Rebow died in 1845 the estate passed to his son-in-law, future English Liberal Party MP John Gurdon Rebow. He commissioned the architect Thomas Hopper to remodel the House in 1846, and William Andrews Nesfield to advise on the relocation of the coach roads and entrances and to advise on the planting of the park and the flower garden.

John Gurdon Rebow died in 1870, and passed the estate to his son Hector Gurdon Rebow, during whose ownership Wivenhoe House survived England's worst-ever earthquake in 1884. The estate was sold to Charles Edmund Gooch in 1902 and whilst within this family the house was requisitioned by the War Department during the two major conflicts of the 20th century. In World War II, the tank regiments stationed here scared off the fallow deer. The house once also served as the headquarters of the SAS.

C E Gooch's son, Charles Michael Gooch, sold Wivenhoe Park including Wivenhoe House to the University of Essex in 1964, under whose ownership it remains today. The University operated Wivenhoe House as a hotel, and added an extension between 1986-88 by local architect Bryan Thomas.

In 2012 the University of Essex re-opened the hotel after a £10m refurbishment and development, with a modern garden wing replacing the 1980s extension. In the main house, each room has its own theme, many of which are designed in the style of hotel chains. Many of the hotel staff are students of Hospitality at the University of Essex.
