= Kuharszki =

Kuharszki and Kuhárszky are Hungarian-language surnames derived from the Polish surname Kucharski. Notable persons with the surname include:

- Béla Kuharszki (29 April 1940 – 7 March 2016), Hungarian footballer
- Zoltán Kuhárszky (born 8 July 1959), tennis player from Hungary who became a Swiss citizen in 1995
