= CO postcode area =

Postcode area within the United Kingdom

Colchester
- Postcode area
- Coordinates: 51.901°N 0.933°E
- Country: United Kingdom
- Postcode area: CO
- Postcode area name: Colchester
- Post towns: 9
- Postcode districts: 16
- Postcode sectors: 74
- Postcodes (live): 13,249
- Postcodes (total): 17,987
- Statistics as at May 2020

The CO postcode area, also known as the Colchester postcode area, is a group of sixteen postcode districts in the east of England, within nine post towns. These cover northeast Essex (including Colchester, Clacton-on-Sea, Frinton-on-Sea, Halstead, Harwich, Manningtree and Walton-on-the-Naze) and a small part of south Suffolk (including Bures and Sudbury). The main sorting office was in Colchester but as at 2021 there was no Mail Centre in Colchester.

== Coverage ==
The approximate coverage of the postcode districts:

Postcode district	Post town	Coverage	Local authority area(s)
CO1	COLCHESTER	Colchester	Colchester
CO2	COLCHESTER	Old Heath, Berechurch, Layer de la Haye	Colchester
CO3	COLCHESTER	Lexden, Fordham Heath, Stanway	Colchester
CO4	COLCHESTER	Greenstead, Highwoods, St Johns, Myland, Boxted, Braiswick	Colchester
CO5	COLCHESTER	Tiptree, Kelvedon, West Mersea, Peldon, Rowhedge	Colchester, Braintree, Maldon
CO6	COLCHESTER	Coggeshall, Earls Colne, Marks Tey, Great Tey, Chappel, White Colne, Wakes Colne, Fordham, Copford, West Bergholt, Great Horkesley, Wormingford, Nayland, Stoke-by-Nayland, Polstead	Colchester, Braintree, Babergh
CO7	COLCHESTER	Brightlingsea, Wivenhoe, Great Bentley, Alresford	Colchester, Tendring, Babergh
CO8	BURES	Bures, Alphamstone	Colchester, Braintree, Babergh
CO9	HALSTEAD	Halstead	Braintree
CO10	SUDBURY	Sudbury, Clare, Lavenham, Long Melford	Babergh, West Suffolk, Braintree
CO11	MANNINGTREE	Manningtree, Lawford, Mistley, Bradfield, Wrabness, Wix, Horsley Cross, Little Bromley, Brantham, Cattawade	Tendring, Babergh
CO12	HARWICH	Harwich, Dovercourt, Parkeston, Ramsey, Little Oakley, Great Oakley, Stones Green	Tendring
CO13	FRINTON-ON-SEA	Frinton-on-Sea	Tendring
CO14	WALTON ON THE NAZE	Walton-on-the-Naze	Tendring
CO15	CLACTON-ON-SEA	Clacton-on-Sea, Jaywick	Tendring
CO16	CLACTON-ON-SEA	Clacton-on-Sea, St Osyth, Little Clacton	Tendring

== Map ==
CO postcode area map, showing postcode districts in red and post towns in grey text, with links to nearby CB, CM and IP postcode areas.

== See also ==
- List of postcode areas in the United Kingdom
- Postcode Address File
