= Stones Green =

Hamlet in Essex, England

Coordinates: 51.897°N 1.146°E

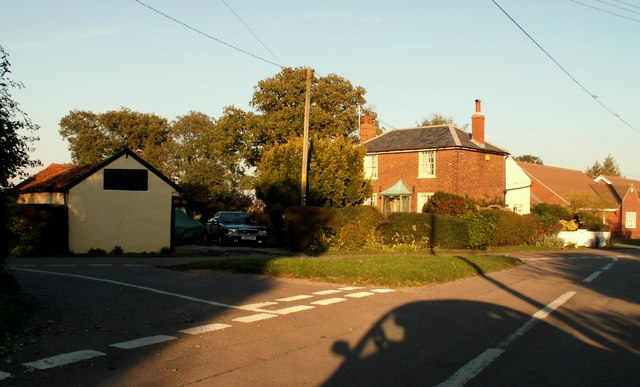

- Location within Essex
- Civil parish: Great Oakley
- District: Tendring
- Shire county: Essex
- Region: East
- Country: England
- Sovereign state: United Kingdom
- Post town: HARWICH
- Postcode district: CO12
- Dialling code: 01255
- Police: Essex
- Fire: Essex
- Ambulance: East of England
- UK Parliament: Harwich and North Essex

Stones Green is a hamlet in the civil parish of Great Oakley, near the village of Wix and the town of Harwich, in the Tendring district of Essex, England.
