= Alresford, Essex =

Village in Essex, England

Coordinates: 51.8492°N 1.0022°E

Alresford
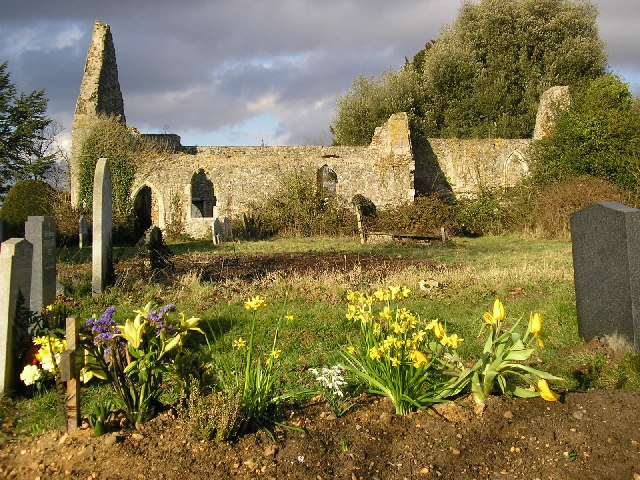
- Ruins of St Peter's Church

- Location within Essex
- Population: 2,462 (Parish, 2021)
- OS grid reference: TM069214
- District: Tendring
- Shire county: Essex
- Region: East
- Country: England
- Sovereign state: United Kingdom
- Post town: Colchester
- Postcode district: CO7
- Dialling code: 01206
- Police: Essex
- Fire: Essex
- Ambulance: East of England
- UK Parliament: Harwich and North Essex
- Website: Alresford Parish Council

Alresford (/ˈɒlsfərd/ OLS-fərd or /ˈeɪlsfərd/ AYLS-fərd) is a village and civil parish in the Tendring district of Essex, England. It is centred 9 km (5.6 mi) southeast of Colchester and is 39 km (24 mi) northeast from the county town of Chelmsford. It has a primary school, pre-school and church. Alresford won the Essex Village of the year competition in 2012 and tied for first place (in its class) for another Essex Village of the Year award in 2019. At the 2021 census the parish had a population of 2,462.

== Geography ==
The village, 9 km (5.6 mi) southeast of Colchester, lies above Alresford Creek, a tributary to the River Colne.

The village's railway station usually sees one service per hour to Walton-on-the-Naze and Colchester. There are also some peak-time services to Clacton-on-Sea and London, operated by Greater Anglia.

The village is on the 62 and 98 bus routes. Services are provided by First Essex.

== History and culture ==
Some prehistoric finds have been found in Alresford. These include cropmark sites and the discovery of a Bronze Age cinerary urn at Alresford Grange in 1942 by school-girl Anne Pilkington in the remains of a barrow. Shards of a potential Early Bronze Age urn made from coarse flint-tempered fabric were found in a gully at Blue Gates Farm Quarry There were also 52 Middle Iron Age pottery shards (600-500 BC), 87 flints (one Mesolithic, the others Neolithic and Bronze Age tools) and two barbed arrow-heads at Broomfield Plantation.

The earliest recorded building in Alresford was a Roman winged-corridor villa, and possibly a bathhouse, that was found in a field 300 yards South-East of Alresford Lodge Farm near to the Creek (TM 0609 1993), excavated in 1885 by H. Laver. The walls had been robbed out but the remaining tesselated corridors and hypocaust showed the villa was 162 1/2 feet long and 10 feet wide. It turned south at a right-angle at both ends. Coins from Faustona and Commodus (161-192 AD) as well as Samian-ware pottery shards are now preserved in Colchester Castle Museum. Plate glass was also found. During the 1920s, ploughing in this field uncovered a large marble basin. Roman bricks can be seen in the ruins of St Peter's and were also found in the foundations of Stable Cottage, Alresford Hall. At Marsh Farm pit five sherds of Late pre-Roman Iron Age/early Romano-British pottery and four struck flint flakes were recovered.

A double-ditched Romano-British enclosure (60x80m) was found with second century samian pottery shards between the Quarters and Plumptons Farm. There were also several ring-ditches containing graves in land quarried at Broomfield Plantation overlooking Alresford Creek. A Saxon ironhead and 4th century axe were found in the area of the Roman Villa excavation.

From 886 East Anglia was under Danelaw, ruled by Guthrum. This lasted until the sieges of nearby Colchester and Maldon in 917 which were won by the Wessex King Edward. Ælfar had estates on both side of the Colne. On his death around 951 these were willed to his daughter, Ælfflæd, and her husband Byrhtnoth. Byrhnoth became Ealdorman of Essex in 956. The Vikings raided periodically from 980 until Olaf Tryggvason returned in 991 with 93 ships. They landed and destroyed Folkestone, Sandwich and Ipswich before heading to Maldon. Here Ealdorman Byrhtnoth and the Essex forces were defeated at the Battle of Maldon. Ælfflæd, his widow willed Ælesforda, consisting of 2 hides and 50 acres, in 1000x1002 to her lord the king. "..In Essex the Domesday hide usually comprised four virgates, each of 30 acres, making a total of 120 acres. On royal manors, however, or at least on some of them, the hide was abnormally large…" So the estate could have been between 290 and 1000 acres. This land is the location of the current Alresford Hall.

In 1086, recorded in separate four Little Folios of the Domesday Book, Alresford was in the ancient hundred of Tendring. There were nineteen households (2 villagers, 13 smallholders, 4 slaves), 2 plough-teams, 60 sheep and 100 pigs owned by four tenants-in-chief. Nominally these were the Bishop of London (St Paul's), Bishop Odo of Bayeux, Eustace II, Count of Boulogne (formerly the King's land valued at £3) and Richard son of Count Gilbert but were let to separate tenants. The land was only valued at about half of its 1066 value and three of the four tenants had changed. No church was mentioned. Within a year, Count Eustace was dead and succeeded by his son Eustace III, Count of Boulogne. In 1088, Bishop Odo and Count Eustace III rebelled against the King, William II, were defeated at Rochester and forced into exile.

The manor in 1211 was held by Geoffrey de Fercles for three knight's fees of the Honour of Boulogne. The assessed value of the lands was 20s 9d By 1300 the manor was owned by Philip de Thundersley. Andrew de Thunderley (died 1311) held of the king 120 acres of arable and 140 acres of wood. The Manor was then valued at 17s 2d, a race of ginger and a stalk of clove gillyflower. The Manor was then inherited by Anfrid de Staunton in 1312 until 1337 and his son Humphrey, then sister Margaret who married Sir John Coggeshall, MP for Essex (UK Parliament constituency) six times between 1334 and 1358, of Codham Hall and Coggeshall, Essex.

Indications of medieval life and 87 pottery shards from the thirteenth to seventeenth century were also found in 1994 and 2001 during field-walking and test trenches in three hectares of land surveyed, at Church Farm north-west of the medieval church by the Essex Archaeological Trust. Agriculture and fishing remained the main form of employment. During Edward I's reign a disagreement about fishing rights led to a fight with men from neighbouring villages and three men drowned.

In 1279, the Manor of Cockaynes was held by Sir John de Sutton of Wivenhoe valued at 19s.

The oldest existent building in Alresford is Brook Farm house dating from the late 15th or 16th century, about three-quarters of a mile East-North-East of the church, on the modern Thorrington Road.

During the Tudor era, a number of wills detailed charity for the poor. A yearly rent-charge of 12s. 8d. on the Milch Pightle field (of the Heath Farm) was left in 1508 by Edmund Porter for the relief of the poor. In 1588, Edmund Porter left Knapps and lands of 31 acres to John Porter and his heirs. In return, Porter was expected to give the poor every Sunday from Whitsun to Michaelmas the milk of two cows; 3s/4d on Good Friday and Christmas Day. This milk tribute was later commuted into a distribution of bread. In 1571, yeoman Richard Boller refers to his almshouse at Alresford.

Alresford Lodge, once the manor of Cockaynes, was held by Mrs Kinnaston of London in 1764. The current Edwardian mansion was built in 1910/11 by Alderman Wilson Marriage JP, The Portreeve of Colchester. From at least 1914, until his death in 1932, Until his death in 1932, Alresford Grange was the home of Wilson Marriage, owner of the successful corn milling company at East Mill Colchester which produced over 2500 bags of flour per week. He served as the mayor of Colchester four times and helped to establish several schools and a comprehensive school was named after him.

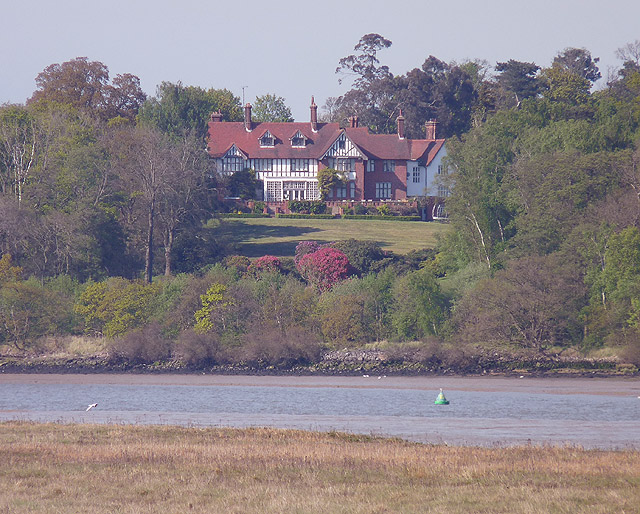
Alresford Grange viewed from the South of Marriages Bight

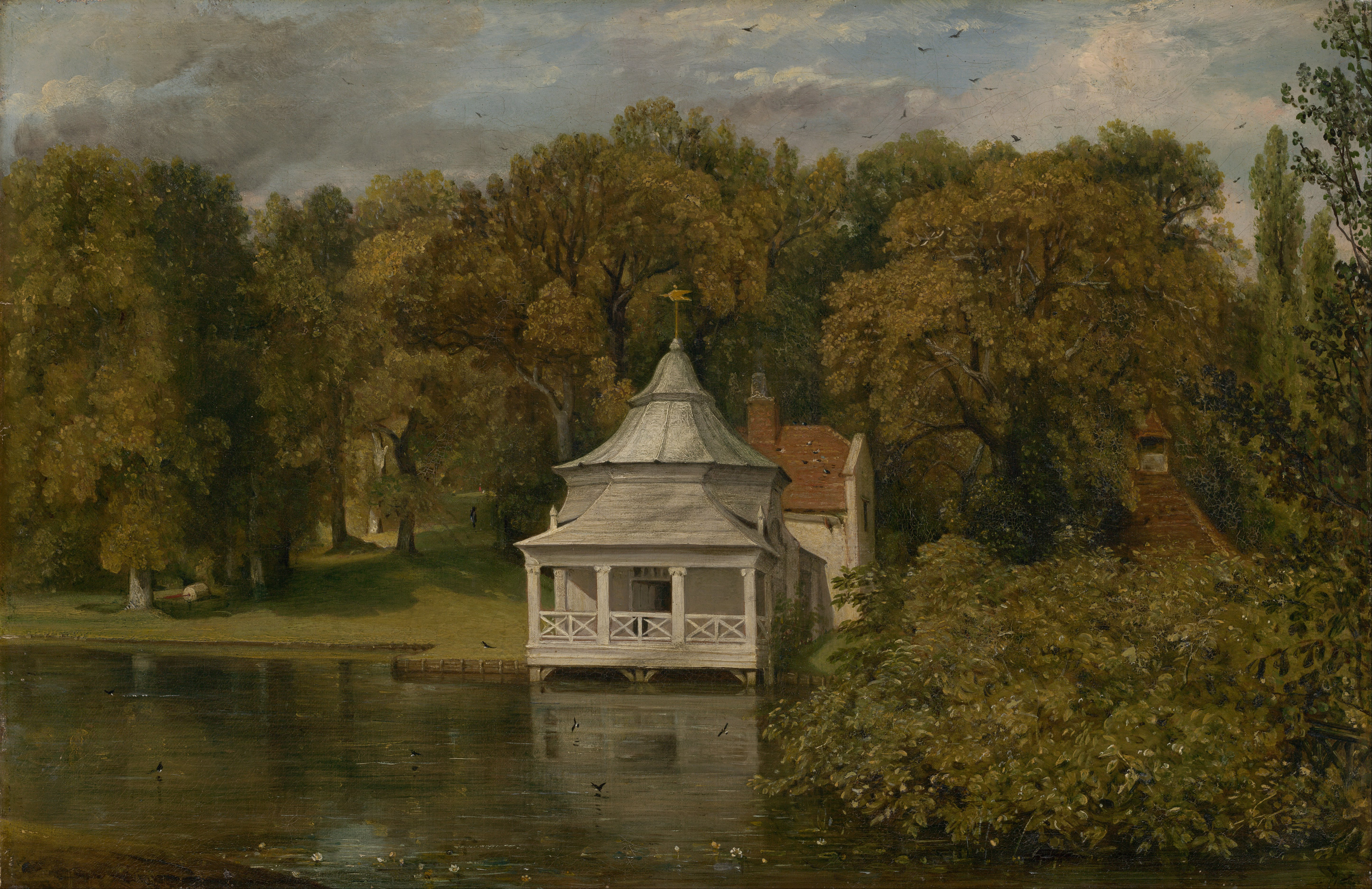
The Quarters behind Alresford Hall by John Constable, 1816

Alresford Hall, as well as the Manors of Alresford and Cockaynes were purchased in Autumn 1721 by Captain Matthew Martin, owner of Wivenhoe House. He was the Captain of the East India Company's "Marlborough" a 480-ton merchant ship with 32 guns. In 1712, the Marlborough was attacked by three French ships but he managed to avoid capture. He received a reward of £1000 and a gold medallion with 24 diamonds for this action. Martin went onto become MP for Colchester twice and Mayor in 1726. By 1738, the Martin family had moved to Alresford Hall and had built a vault in St Peter's Church. The remodelling of the house was completed by his granddaughter Mary Martin Rebow and her husband Isaac Martin Rebow of Wivenhoe House, who was MP for Colchester between 1755 and 1781. At one stage the old hall was not water-tight, as recorded in a letter by his cousin Mary Martin in August 1778 ".. begs you will speak to Mr. Ennew and have the Old Building kept up as tight as possible till the new one is erected.." Richard Woods designed improvements to the grounds and house, but these were not completed before Isaac Martin Rebow's death in 1781. An indenture of 1786 left the Hall, the Quarters, eight farms and the Ship House in trust for his daughters.

Around this time, many of the brick farms, lodges and other buildings were under construction along Church Lane and Wivenhoe Road; including the Pointer Inn (deeds from 1780), Ship House (Indenture of 1786) and Bay Tree Cottage The main crops harvested in 1788 were peas, carrots, rye and wheat. The population though was 201 at the 1801 Census and the main road was from Wivenhoe across the Creek to Brightlingsea.

Thomas Martin had begun renovating The Quarters, a cottage on the Sixpenny Creek, south of Alresford Hall. He died in 1775, then his son-in-law in 1781 so his daughter Mary Martin Rebow completed it from the existing plans for the Chinese temple. Her son-in-law, Manor General Francis Slater Rebow returned from being a staff officer in the Peninsula Wars and in 1816 commissioned John Constable to paint both the park of Wivenhoe House and The Quarters behind Alresford Hall. Constable described the Quarters as "a beautiful little fishing hut, where the young Lady (who is the heroine of all these scenes) goes occasionally to angle". This was General Rebow's daughter Mary-Martin wearing red who can be seen on the path. This painting was taken by descendants of the Martin Family to Australia in the nineteenth century and is now in the National Gallery of Victoria. In 1951, The Quarters became a private house.

At the time of the 1831 Census, there were 291 villagers living in only 55 houses in Alresford. Of the 75 men over 20 years of age: 57 were involved in agriculture and 14 in retail or handicrafts. The population stayed between c.200 and c.300 until 1951.

In 1839 and 1843, the Tithe Maps were drawn that showed 251 parcels of land with a rent-charge of £356 payable to Rev. John Taylor Allen. The whole parish measured 1426 acres 2 roods 21 perches of which 1056a 2r 31p were arable, 220 acres wood and 36 acres glebe. In 1848 there were horse-drawn omnibuses operating between Colchester and Brightlingsea which passed through the village.

Even before Foster's 1870 Elementary Education Act, granted schooling to children between the ages of five and twelve, children in Alresford already had an education. In 1818, a Sunday school contained 30 boys and girls taught by the master, who was also the clerk of the parish, He was paid £4 pa. by subscription. "The poorer classes are without sufficient means of instruction, but desirous of having them." By 1833, this had grown to 37 males and 36 females supported by voluntary contributions " In 1846, WW Hawkins built the original school in Church Lane as part of the National Schools network. In 1882, this Parochial School (mixed), had 50 children taught by Miss Amelia Chisnell. and was given to the parish in 1890 by Mrs. Hawkins.

White's Directory of Essex 1848 described the village as "..ALRESFORD is a pleasant village and parish, on the eastern side of the vale of the river Colne, 5½ miles South East of Colchester, containing 289 souls, and 1427A.2R.25P. of land, watered by two rivulets, which fall into a creek of the Colne, on the south side of the parish. The creek is fordable at low water; and from this ford, and the alders still growing near it, the parish had its name.

It is in two manors, Alresford and Cockayne, both now held by Mrs. Mary Higginbotham, of London, and formerly by the Fercle, Staunton, Tabor, Cockayne, and other families. Most of the soil belongs to other proprietors, the largest of whom is W.W. Hawkins, Esq., of Alresford Hall, which stands on an eminence, and has lately been much enlarged. Mr. Hawkins is the lessee of the manors.."

The Tendring Hundred Railway, later owned by the Great Eastern Railway, cut Alresford in half, slightly north of Wivenhoe Road in 1866, with a station built that's still standing. Engineer in chief was Peter Bruff, who then built the Clacton to Thorpe line and created Clacton-on-Sea as a holiday resort from 1871. There were three or four trains a day between Colchester and Walton; with Sunday services only in summer. In 1959, the line was the first in the country to be electrified at 25kV AC overhead line collection; previous systems had exclusively used lower-voltage DC traction. On Saturday 12th August 2017, the steam locomotive "Tornado" journeyed between London and Walton-on-the-Naze to celebrate the 150th anniversary of the line carrying 2000 passengers. On 15 March 2018, the line was closed by a landslip a few hundred metres east of the station

A further line of 5 1/2 miles (8 km) was opened in 1866 along the River Colne linking Wivenhoe and Brightlingsea via a 430 foot long iron, swing-bridge over Alresford Creek. This became GER bridge number 1035, was of 10 spans and sat on 4 foot diameter (1.2 metre) cylinder piles. The bridge was normally left open two hours either side of high water unless a train was coming. Otherwise two men had to row from the north side of the Creek where a boat-house and cottage in 1895 (since demolished) were located and manually move the bridge. Initially, trains had to keep to a 10 mph speed limit, but this was cut to only 5 mph due to the later state of the bridge. The line being built on soft clay embankments and wooden trestles only three feet above the high tide level was prone to flooding. This it did in 1874 and 1876. The embankments were raised, but the line flooded again in 1882. During Black Friday of 1897 a train trying to force its way through the floods got stuck and the passengers were rescued by boat. Further closures occurred in November 1901, November 1903, December 1904, January 1928 and April 1949. Finally after the Great Storm of 31 January 1953 the line was closed for eleven months In 1930, the LNER consulted about making the bridge fixed and the Colchester Planning sub-committee was asked to consider whether this would impede navigation. Other incidents are recorded of the bridge not closing properly in 1938 and of the bridge being hit by a barge "Serlo" causing £148 damage in 1940. This line closed in 1964, and the swing-bridge removed in 1967. This route was filmed in Autumn 1963 and is free to watch at the BFI.

The railways spurred on some growth in Alresford. A post office and smithy at the junction of Coach Road and Wivenhoe Road are marked on the 1874 Ordnance Survey 1:2500 map. There is also a Primitive Methodist Chapel a mile north of the Church on the Main Road (near to the current Alresford Garage).

In 1931 Census, there were 312 villagers living in only 87 houses in Alresford. During the 1930s more houses were built along Wivenhoe Road, Station Road and the Main Road. The village was bypassed with the building of a new bridge over the railway between High Elm Farm and Wivenhoe Road. This opened on Saturday 17 March 1938 at a cost of £21,800. Prior to this the main road had crossed the levelling crossing in Coach Road, then turned at the Post Office corner before continuing along Wivenhoe Road. The Alresford Sand and Ballast Company was incorporated in 1932 by Ben and Martin Barrell after selling the ropewalk at Wivenhoe Cross and used the ballast quay at the Creek to send sand to London via Thames barge. The remains of the wooden beamed sand conveyor and aerial runway to the processing plant can still be seen.

The village contains the ruins of St. Peter's Church which are now a scheduled monument under the care of Essex County Council The earliest church was built in the 12th century as a simple nave and cancel. At the south-west and north-west corners Roman bricks were used for the quions. In the 13th century the chancel was extended. The church was again rebuilt in the 14th century and a singled tower added. This was recorded on a gravestone as being funded by Anfred de Staunton in 1320, who had recently become Lord of the Manor of Alresford. St Peter's was then extended again in the 1840s. The first known Rector was Thomas Parker, succeeded in 1332 by Stephen de Berle on the presentation of Sir Humphrey de Staunton. There has been an unbroken line of over 50 Rectors since then.

Outside the Church a War Memorial was unveiled by the Bishop of Colchester on 2 June 1920. Men from Alresford had fought throughout the Western Front and on the battle-cruiser HMS Indefatigable at the Battle of Jutland. The First World War inscription reads:

TO THE GLORY OF GOD
AND IN HONOURED
MEMORY OF
THE ALRESFORD MEN
WHO FELL IN THE
GREAT WAR
1914-1919

Following the Second World War, a second inscription was added to commemorate the five local men lost in that conflict. In 2004 the memorial was restored using grant money from the War Memorials Trust.

When St. Peter's Church burnt down on Saturday 2 October 1971, it was replaced by the 1975 Essex-barn style church of St. Andrew's and St Peter's closer to the modern village centre which is a flexible space that can sit 200 people. There is a thriving congregation of 70 adults with a children's and youth ministry. This is also used by local groups, including bumps and babies, scramblers (for toddlers), Razmatazz (for 5 -11), Messy Church and Hang Out@The Hub (Y6 upwards).

Close to the modern church is the Village Hall opened in 1937 by Brig.-Gen. K. J, Kincaid-Smith C.B., C.M.G., D.S.O. at a cost of £700 raised over two years. A major source of funding came from a village fete and sports day held at Alresford hall which raised £295. A Management Committee was established by the Alresford Parochial Church Council, Alresford Football Club, Alresford Silver Band and inhabitants of the hamlet of Elmstead Heath. The Hall is used for elections and many other local activities, including the local Scout Group, indoor bowling, weddings, photographic club, luncheon club, horticultural club and monthly Farmers Market. The Hall was extended in 2015. Behind the church and village hall is the 3.2 hectares recreation ground, with an award-winning children's playground and space for football pitches used by Alresford Colne Rangers Football Club and a cricket square. Alresford Parish Council offices and meeting room together with sports changing facilities can be found in The Pavilion (a building attached to the rear of the Village Hall). The Pavilion boasts a well stocked bar and kitchen area. There is a bookable floodlit hard court area for football, tennis or basketball on the playing field. The playing field is shown on the plans of the Village Hall as already in existence in 1937.

Alresford Silver Band was formed in 1910 as Alresford United Brass Band. During the 1930s, the Band often led Remembrance Parades in Colchester, Copford, Feering, Fordham, Frating, Wivenhoe and carnivals in Clacton and Maldon. The bandmaster during 1934-1938 was Frank Watsham, a retired LNER signalman.

During World War 2, many of the men went off to war. They were replaced by members of the Women's Land Army at Cockaynes Farm. At Ford Farm, the Land girls and POWs from a local camp used horses to work the fields. The school welcomed evacuees, including some who didn't stay long before returning to their homes. Due to the short warning time from attacking V1 flying bombs in 1944, a telephone was installed. The local volunteer unit was Wivenhoe Platoon, 17th Essex Home Guard led by Charles Gooch of Wivenhoe House. They were filmed practicing in Wivenhoe Gravel Pit in May 1943. War time regulations were strictly enforced by the ARP Warden Mr Pilkington; leading to a fine of £2 in each of two cases of showing lights from buildings at night for one household in July 1940.

In the 1960s and 1970s many houses were built in the triangle between Station Road, Wivenhoe Road and Main Road. This led to the population growing from 926 living in 311 houses in 1961 to over 2000 people living in c.800 houses by the Millennium. The village's shops and Post Office are located here in Station Road. Fields to the north of the railway station and south of St Andrew's are adding a further 314 homes. Many of the streets are named after varieties of apples previously grown in the orchards.

A mile to the south of the village, past the ruins of St. Peter's, is the picturesque Alresford Creek. Here are fifty yacht moorings managed by Alresford Creek Boat Owners since 1976. (The ford is no longer passable by 4x4 vehicles due to the amount of mud at the bottom of the creek. Although it is still marked as fordable on Ordnance Survey maps.) This is being used by Apple TV+ from 25 January 2021 as a filming location for 1890s Adwinter (a fictional village set near the River Blackwater that's only five miles away) in The Essex Serpent set in 1890. This required all modern yachts to be removed for the duration of filming.

== Village PCSO ==
In 2008 Alresford made the news when it was reported that its residents were unhappy with the rising levels of crime. In response to this, on top of their normal taxes the villagers paid an additional £13,000 so that the local Essex Police could have an officer assigned to specifically patrol the village. The appointed Police Community Support Officer (PCSO) was seen as a success by the villagers and was credited in an overall reduction of crime in the village. Despite the large amount spent on having her specifically patrol the village residents voted eight to three to keep her post. Official figures show that since the deployment of a dedicated PCSO for the village crime has been reduced including criminal damage and anti social behaviour, which was previously increasing in the village before the PCSO was appointed. The cost of PCSO is now shared with a neighbouring village, Great Bentley.

== See also ==
- HMS Alresford
