= The Quarters Behind Alresford Hall =

Painting by John Constable

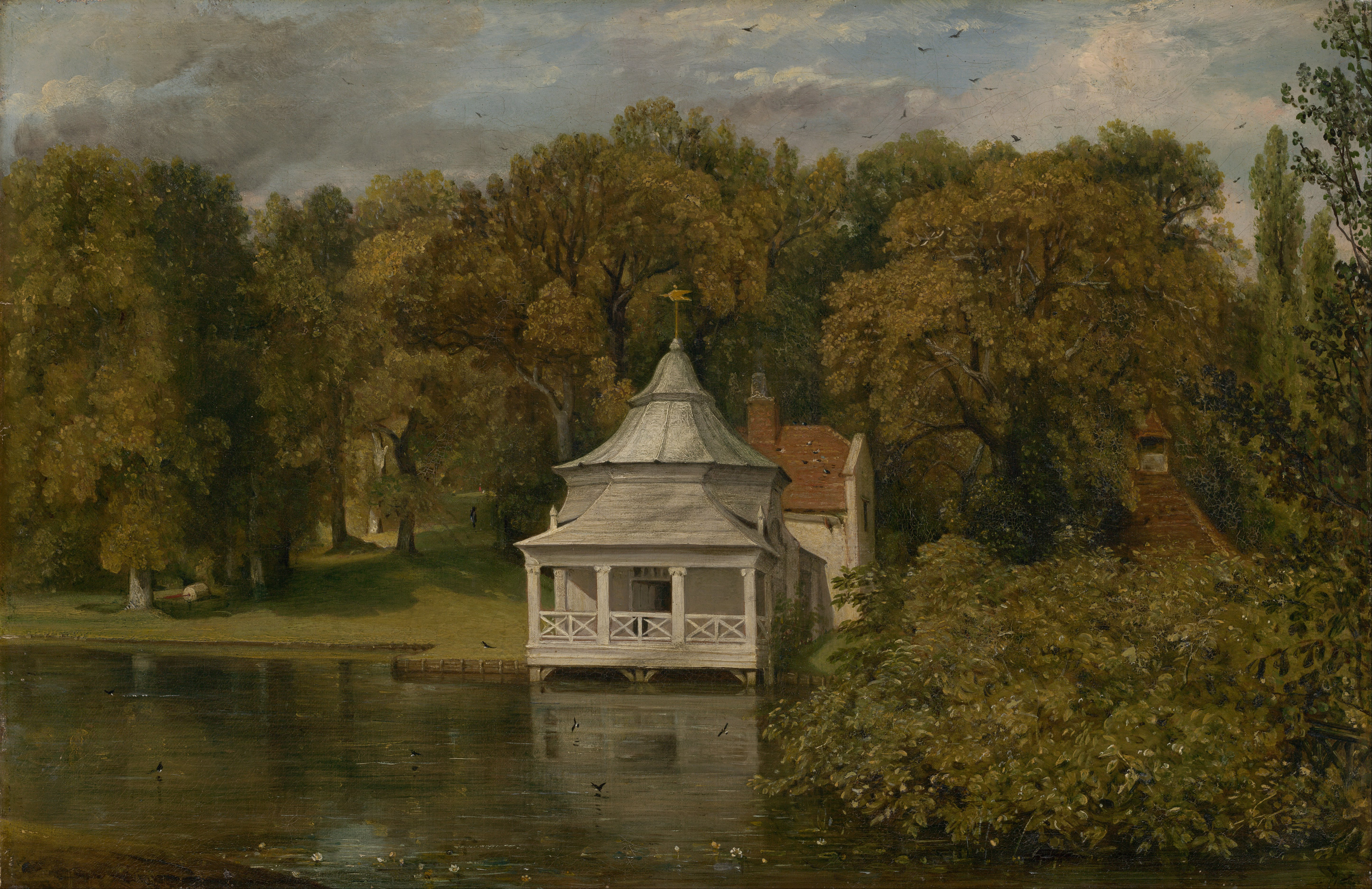
- Artist: John Constable
- Year: 1816
- Type: Oil on canvas, landscape
- Dimensions: 33.5 cm × 51.5 cm (13.2 in × 20.3 in)
- Location: National Gallery of Victoria; Melbourne

The Quarters Behind Alresford Hall is an 1816 landscape painting by the English artist John Constable. It depicts a fishing lodge at Alresford Hall near the Essex village of Alresford. The Hall was owned by the Regency era General Francis Slater Rebow. Constable was also commissioned to produce a work of another of his properties Wivenhoe Park the same year. The lodge at Alresford, known as The Quarters, was designed for banqueting and was located at the side of the lake in the grounds.

Today it is in the collection of the National Gallery of Victoria in Melbourne, having been acquired in 1958.

== See also ==
- List of paintings by John Constable

== Bibliography ==
- Bettley, James & Pevsner, Nikolaus. Essex. Yale University Press, 2007.
- Clarkson, Jonathan & Cox, Neil. Constable & Wivenhoe Park: Reality & Vision. University of Essex, 2000.
- Cowell, Fiona. Richard Woods (1715-1793): Master of the Pleasure Garden. Boydell & Brewer, 2009.
- Gray, Anne & Gage, John. Constable: Impressions of Land, Sea and Sky. National Gallery of Australia, 2006.
- Reynolds, Graham. Constable's England. Metropolitan Museum of Art, 1983.
