= Wivenhoe Park =

Landscaped park in Essex, England

Coordinates: 51.87824°N 0.95173°E

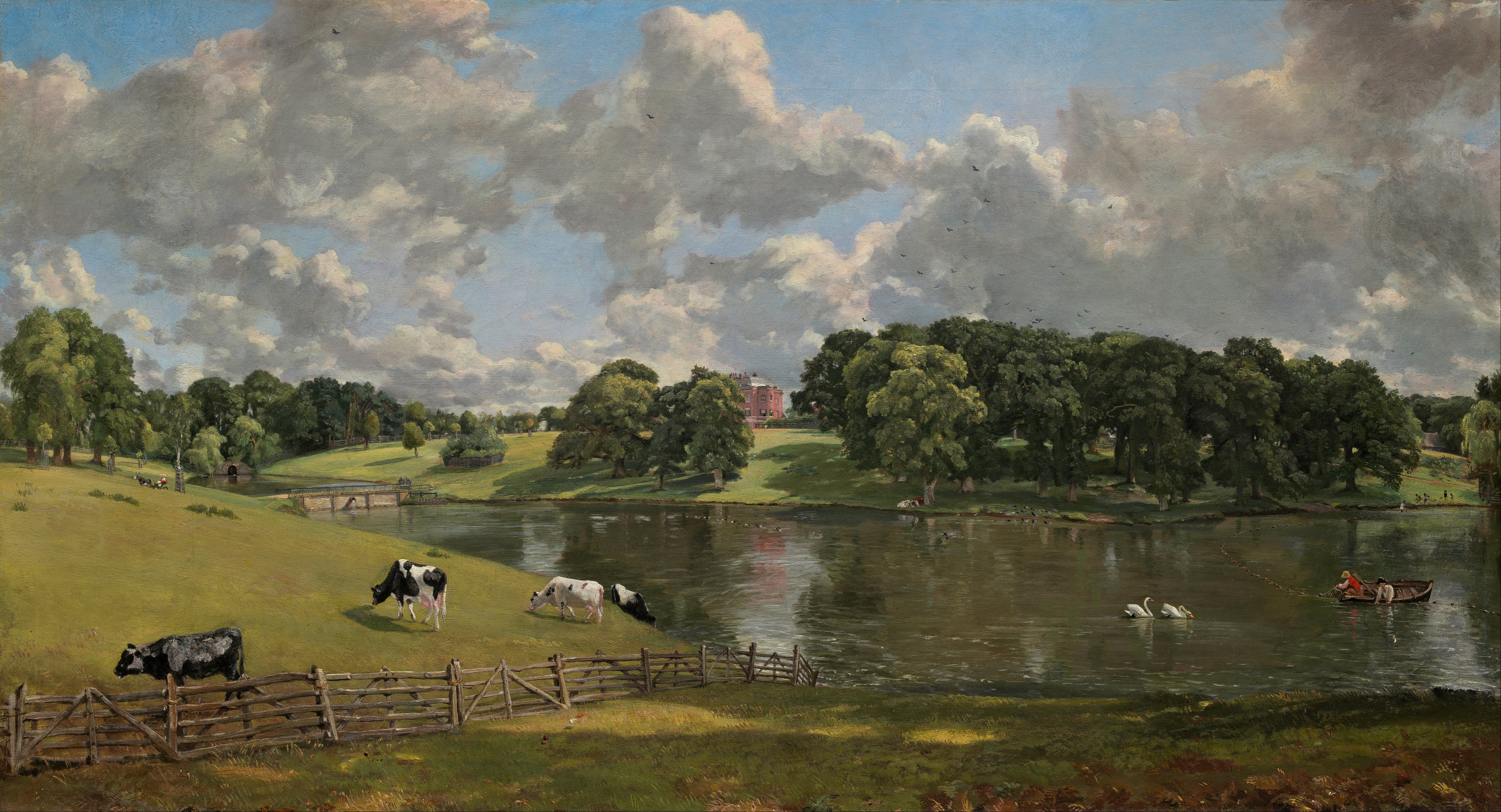
Wivenhoe Park by John Constable

Wivenhoe Park is a landscaped green space of more than 200 acres (81 ha) at the eastern edge of Colchester, England. It is the site of Wivenhoe House, a four-star hotel, based in an eighteenth-century Grade II listed house. Wivenhoe House is also home to the Edge Hotel School, the first school of its kind in the UK and since October 2018 a department of the University of Essex. Since the 1960s, Wivenhoe Park has also been home to the Colchester Campus of the University of Essex.

John Constable painted the park in 1816. His painting, Wivenhoe Park, is now in the National Gallery of Art, Washington DC.

Wivenhoe Park has received a Green Flag Award six times and has received a Gold Award as a Hedgehog Friendly Campus. The parkland has been voted one of the top ten green spaces in the UK, in the People's Choice Award on four consecutive occasions and is the only university campus to have achieved this award.

The park is host to a very large colony of rabbits. Habitat surveys have identified many other species at Wivenhoe Park.

== History ==
In 1845, Wivenhoe Park was inherited by John Gurdon Rebow, the widow of Mary Rebow, the daughter of Lt General Francis Slater Rebow depicted in Constable's painting. John Gurdon Rebow rebuilt Wivenhoe House and remodelled the park.

In April 1856, Prince Albert visited Colchester to inspect the new barracks and travelled out to see some of the troops on exercise in Wivenhoe Park, presumably at the invitation of John Gurdon Rebow. A report of the royal visit to Wivenhoe Park, including an engraving, was published by the London Illustrated News.

Wivenhoe Park was sold to the Gooch family in 1908.

== Features ==
Outstanding trees still remain at Wivenhoe Park including ancient oaks and the cork oaks planted by John Constable. A tree walk detailing close to 40 trees in the parkland was created by Christopher Howard in 2013.

Wivenhoe House is included on the Statutory List of Buildings of Special Architectural or Historic Interest as a Grade II* listed building. Other listed structures in Wivenhoe Park include two Gatehouses (one to the east of the house, and the other to the north-west), the Stable Block, and the boundary wall and ha-ha which provide the domestic curtilage to the house. Each of these structures is Grade II listed. Wivenhoe Park is included on the Register of Parks and Gardens of Special Historic Interest.

Another notable building within the grounds is the Sports Pavilion designed by influential architects John Meunier and Barry Gasson and now used by student sports teams. The design reflects some of the ideas later used in their designs for The Burrell Collection in Glasgow.

== Constable's painting ==
Constable was invited to stay at Wivenhoe House in August 1816. The painting depicts the parkland surrounding Wivenhoe House including cows grazing, swans on the lake and fishermen bringing in their nets. Major Rebow's daughter, Mary Rebow, is depicted riding her donkey cart.
