= James Nixon (painter) =

English painter (c.1741–1812)

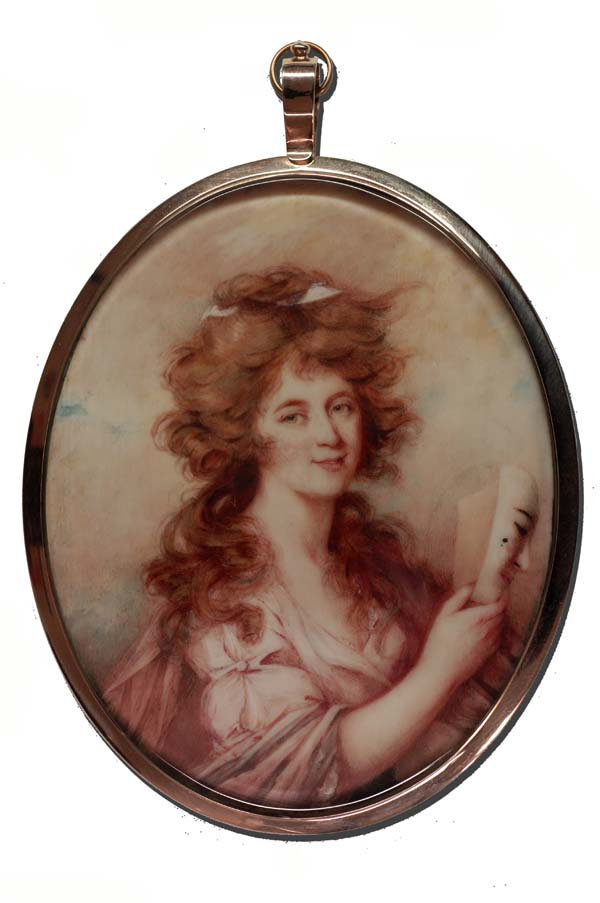
Portrait of Elizabeth Farren (1759–1829), later Countess of Derby, c.1780, miniature by James Nixon

James Nixon ARA (c. 1741 – 1812) was an English miniature painter.

== Life ==
Baptised on 17 July 1741 in Lincoln, Nixon studied at the Royal Academy Schools from March 1769. He first exhibited with the Society of Artists (1765–1771), and from 1772 to 1805 was an annual contributor to the Royal Academy.

Nixon was a leading miniaturist of his time, and held the appointments of limner to the Prince of Wales and miniature-painter to the Duchess of York; in 1778 he was elected Associate of the Royal Academy. He resided in London for most of his professional career, but spent periods in Edinburgh and Newcastle.

Nixon married Frances Elizabeth Carrington (1752–1823), daughter of the Reverend James Carrington, chancellor of the diocese of Exeter, in Devon on 30 October 1777. Around 1780 they had a son, James, and may have had other children. Nixon died in Tiverton on 9 May 1812, aged 71. He was financially unsuccessful.

== Works ==
Nixon painted Elizabeth Farren and other theatrical celebrities, as well as figures of Shakespearean characters. He sent some portraits in oil to the Royal Academy, and in 1786 a series of ten designs illustrating Tristram Shandy. His portraits of Dr. Francis Willis, the Duchess of Devonshire, Elizabeth Hartley, and the sisters Jenny and Nelly Bennet were engraved.
