= Portrait of Maria Constable =

Painting by John Constable

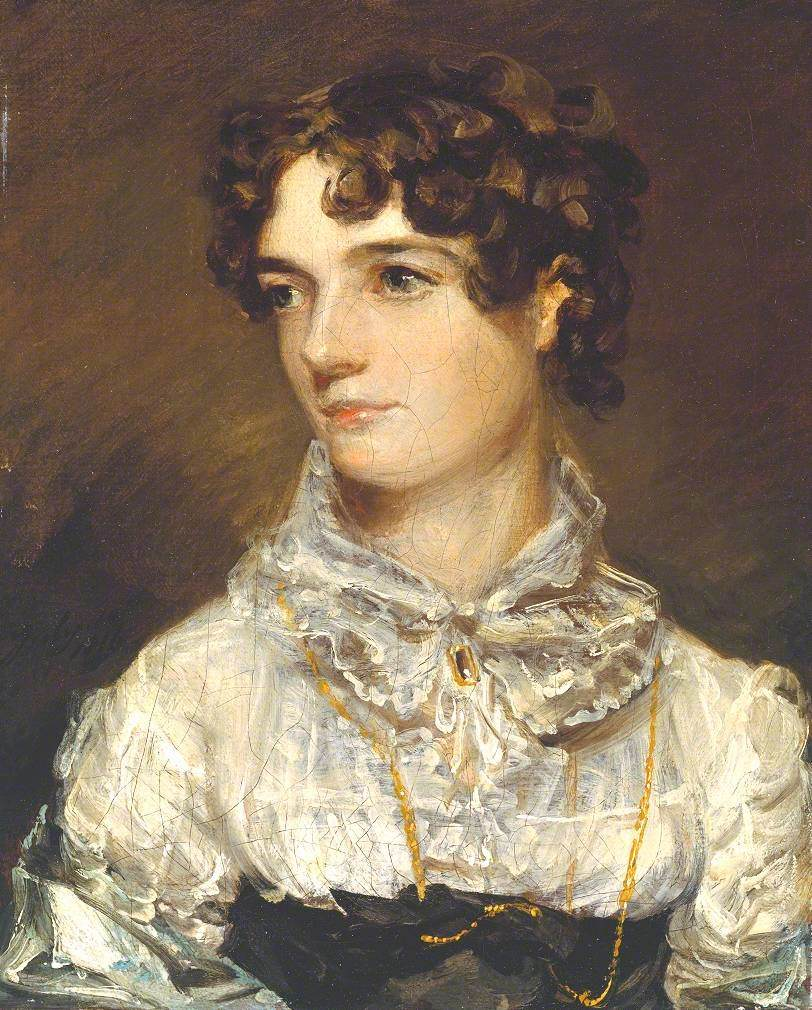
- Artist: John Constable
- Year: c.1816
- Type: Oil on canvas, portrait painting
- Dimensions: 30.5 cm × 25.2 cm (12.0 in × 9.9 in)
- Location: Tate Britain, London

Portrait of Maria Constable is a c.1816 portrait painting by the British artist John Constable depicting his wife Maria Constable at the age of around 28. It was painted around three months before the couple married, as a love token between them. It is also known as Portrait of Maria Bicknell in reference to her maiden name.

After a lengthy courtship due to her family's objections, the couple finally were married in 1816 and lived together in London, Hampstead and Brighton, a period coinciding with Constable's breakthrough success at the Salon of 1824 in Paris. She died of consumption in 1828.

Although best known for his landscape paintings, Constable began his career as a portraitist and continued to occasionally produce pictures of family or close acquaintances. This painting was not exhibited in John Constable's lifetime and passed to the couple's children. It was later acquired by the art collector George Salting. In 1910 he left the work to the nation as part of the Salting Bequest and it is now part of the collection of the Tate Britain in Pimlico.

== Bibliography ==
- Bailey, Anthony. John Constable: A Kingdom of his Own. Random House, 2012.
- Gayford, Martin & Lyles, Anne. Constable Portraits: The Painter and His Circle. National Portrait Gallery, 2009.
