= Pedro de Uceda =

Spanish Baroque painter

Pedro de Uceda (died 1741) was a Spanish Baroque painter. His exact year of birth is not known.

Not much is known about his life. He initially studied under Lucas de Valdes. He painted religious-themed works for church commissions.
