= Kuchary =

Kuchary may refer to the following places in Poland:

- Kuchary, Dzierżoniów County in Lower Silesian Voivodeship (south-west Poland)
- Kuchary, Oława County in Lower Silesian Voivodeship (south-west Poland)
- Kuchary, Kutno County in Łódź Voivodeship (central Poland)
- Kuchary, Łęczyca County in Łódź Voivodeship (central Poland)
- Kuchary, Radomsko County in Łódź Voivodeship (central Poland)
- Kuchary, Lesser Poland Voivodeship (south Poland)
- Kuchary, Gmina Stopnica in Świętokrzyskie Voivodeship (south-central Poland)
- Kuchary, Gmina Wiślica in Świętokrzyskie Voivodeship (south-central Poland)
- Kuchary, Masovian Voivodeship (east-central Poland)
- Kuchary, Greater Poland Voivodeship (west-central Poland)
- Kuchary, Silesian Voivodeship (south Poland)
