= Portrait of Benjamin Hoadly =

Painting by William Hogarth

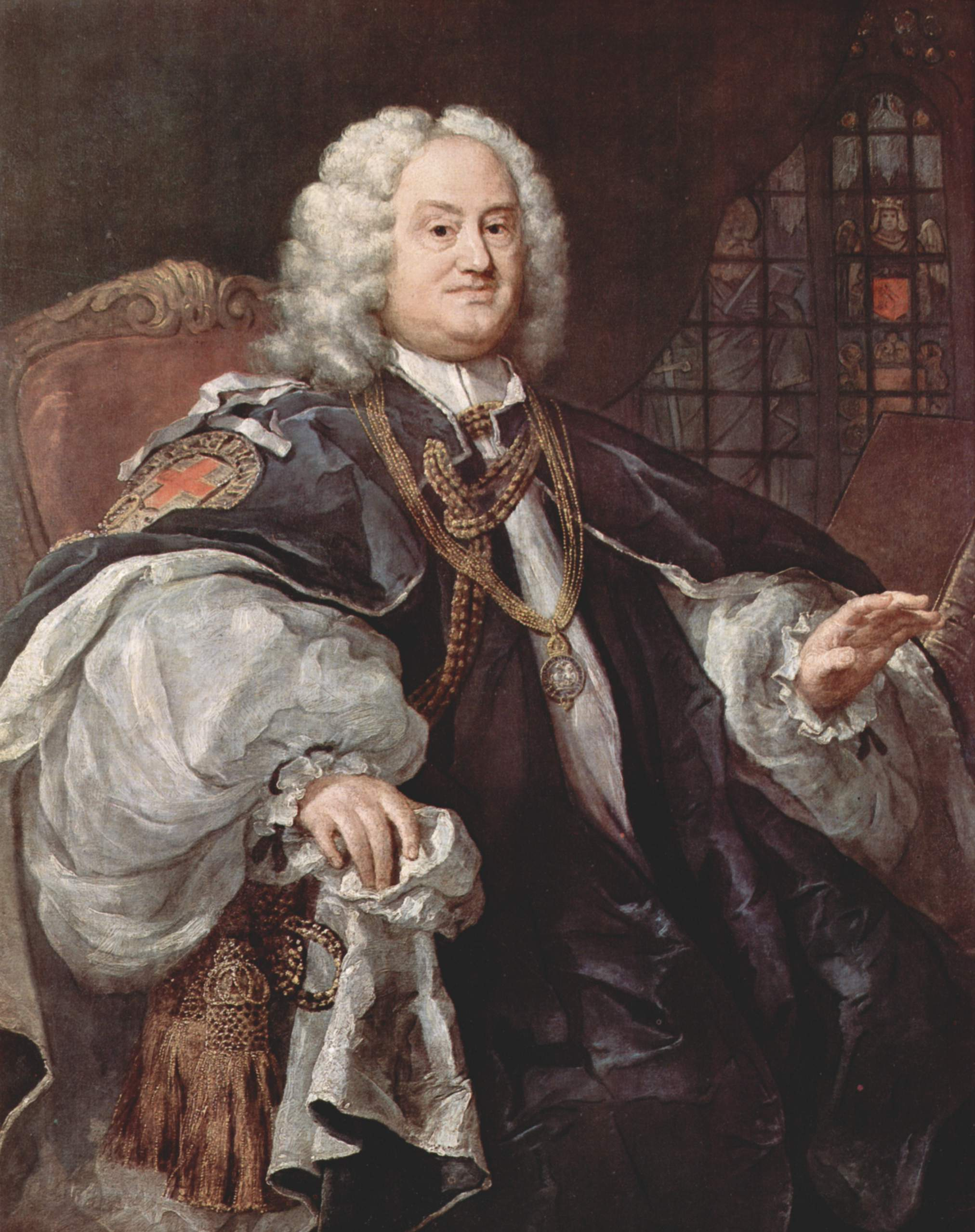
- Artist: William Hogarth
- Year: 1741
- Type: Oil on canvas, portrait painting
- Dimensions: 127.3 cm × 101.5 cm (50.1 in × 40.0 in)
- Location: Tate Britain; London

Portrait of Benjamin Hoadly is a 1741 portrait painting by the British artist William Hogarth. It depicts the Church of England cleric Benjamin Hoadly, then serving as Bishop of Winchester. A strong supporter of the Hanoverian Succession, Hoadly was known for initiating the Bangorian Controversy earlier in his career.

Hogarth depicts him in his robes as bishop and as prelate as the Order of the Garter. Behind him is a stained glass window featuring Saint Paul, a reference to Hoadly's own Pauline theology. LToday the painting is in the collection of the Tate Britain in London, having been purchased in 1910. The French engraver Bernard Baron produced a line engraving based on the picture in 1743. The work should not be confused with portraits Hogarth produced of the bishop's son the physician Benjamin Hoadly.

== Bibliography ==
- Bindman, David. Hogarth and His Times: Serious Comedy. University of California Press, 1997.
- Einberg, Elizabeth and Egerton, Judy. The Age of Hogarth: British Painters Born 1675-1709. Tate Gallery, 1988.
