= François-Anne David =

French line-engraver

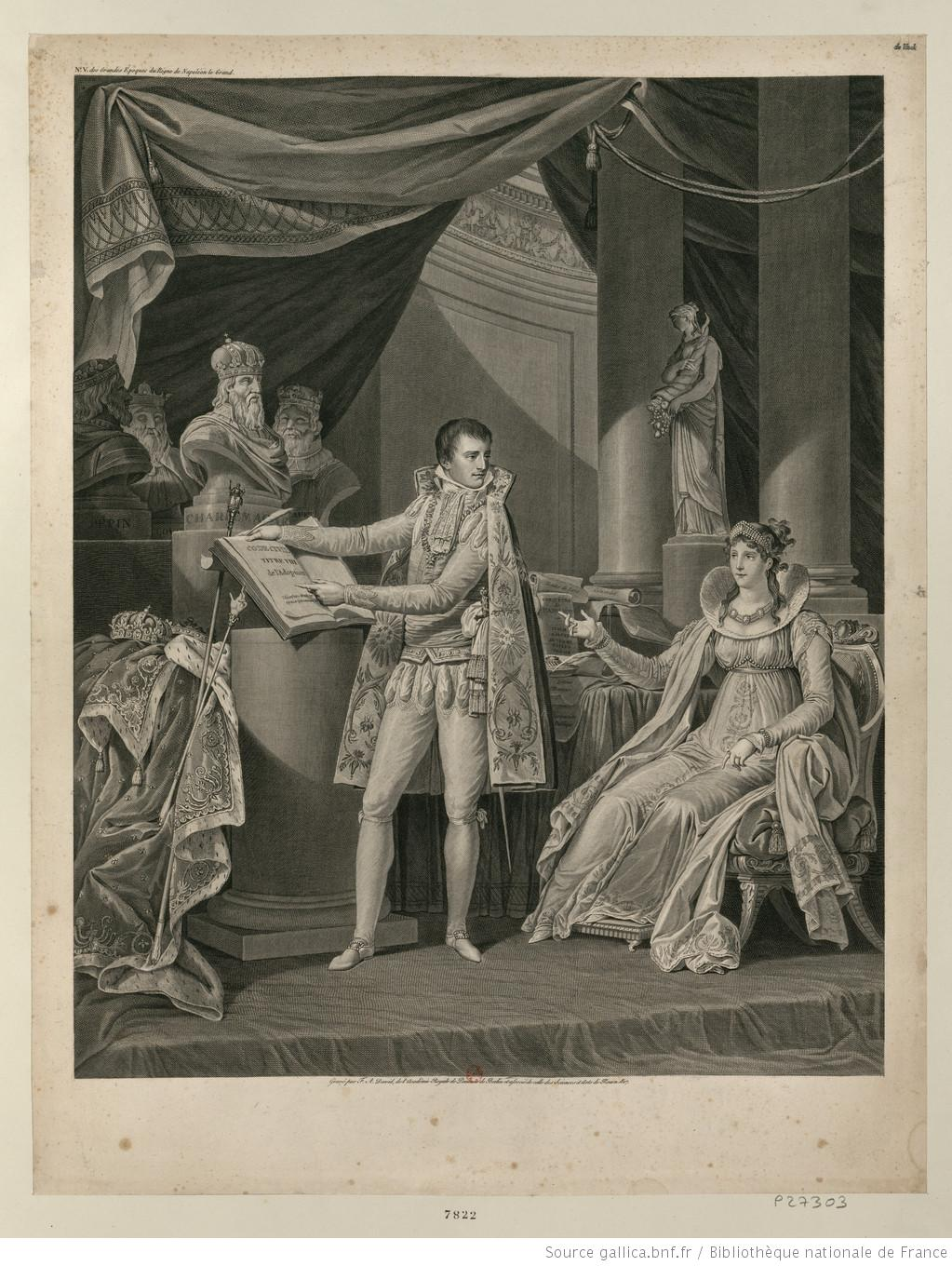
Napoleon Presents the Civil Code to Empress Joséphine, 1807, Bibliothèque nationale de France, Paris

François Anne David (1741-1824), was a French line-engraver.

David was born in Paris in 1741, where he lived and worked all his life. He was a pupil of Le Bas, and engraved several portraits and other subjects in a neat, finished style. He died in Paris in 1824.

== Portraits ==
- Louis Stanislas Xavier, Monsieur, afterwards Louis XVIII; after Drouais.
- Louis XVIII; full-length, in his robes; after himself.
- Denis Diderot; after L. M. van Loo.
- César Gabriel de Choiseul, Duc de Praslin; after Roslin.
- Catharine II, Empress of Russia; after Mlle. Durameau.
- Gaspard Netscher, painter, his Wife and Son; after Netscher.
- Charles I of England with his Family; after Van Dyck.

== Subjects after various masters ==
- Adam and Eve in Paradise; after Santerre.
- Christ crowned with thorns; after Titian.
- St. Cecilia; after Raphael.
- The Dutch Sportsman; after G. Metsu.
- The Green-Market at Amsterdam; after the same.
- The Quack Doctor; after Karel Du Jardin.
- The Bull; after Paul Potter.
- Two Views of the Gulf of Venice; after Joseph Vernet.
- Two Views near Dunkirk; after the same.
