= Joshua Commanding the Sun to Stand Still upon Gibeon =

1816 painting by John Martin

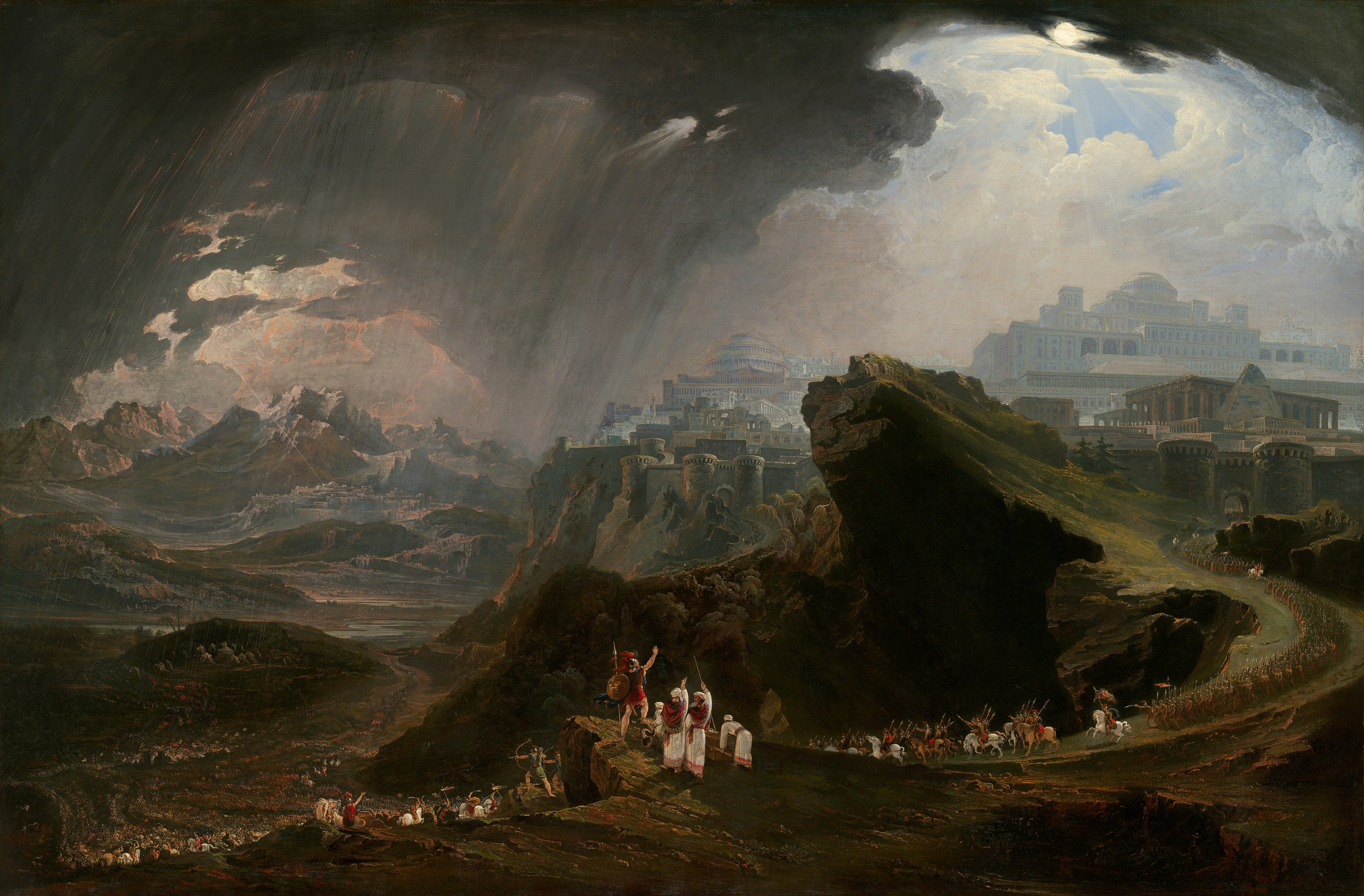
- Artist: John Martin
- Year: 1816
- Type: Oil on canvas, historical landscape painting
- Dimensions: 150 cm × 231 cm (59 in × 91 in)
- Location: National Gallery of Art, Washington, D.C.

Joshua Commanding the Sun to Stand Still upon Gibeon is an 1816 biblical landscape painting by the British artist John Martin. It depicts Joshua the Israelite leader coming to the assistance of the besieged city of Gibeon. He appeals to God to halt the Sun in order to give his army more time to fight by daylight, as recounted in the Hebrew Bible book of Joshua. Romantic in style, it was Martin's breakthrough picture, receiving praise both when it was shown at the Royal Academy's Summer Exhibition of 1816 at Somerset House and when it appeared at the British Institution the following year.

Today it is in the collection of the National Gallery of Art in Washington, D.C., having been acquired in 2004.

== Bibliography ==
- Meisel, Martin. Realizations: Narrative, Pictorial, and Theatrical Arts in Nineteenth-Century England. Princeton University Press, 2014.
- Myrone, Martin. John Martin: Apocalypse. Tate Publishing, 2012.
