= Fordham Heath =

Hamlet in Essex, England

Coordinates: 51.904°N 0.813°E

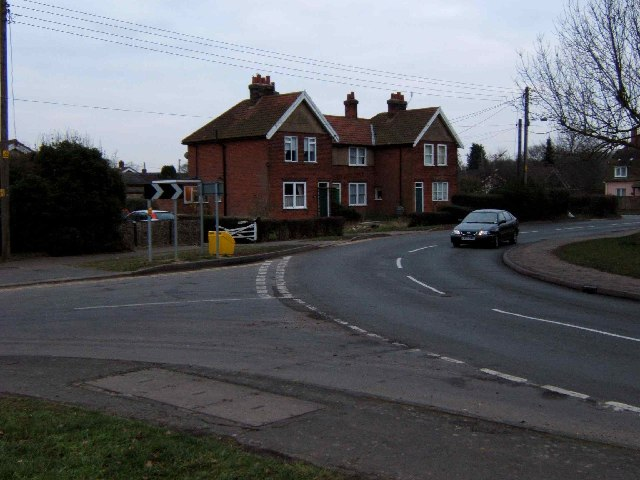
- Bend on Fiddlers Hill

- Location within Essex
- Civil parish: Eight Ash Green
- District: City of Colchester
- Shire county: Essex
- Region: East
- Country: England
- Sovereign state: United Kingdom
- Post town: COLCHESTER
- Postcode district: CO3
- Dialling code: 01206
- Police: Essex
- Fire: Essex
- Ambulance: East of England
- UK Parliament: Harwich and North Essex

Fordham Heath is a hamlet near the A1124 road, in the civil parish of Eight Ash Green, in the Colchester district of Essex, England. It is near the city of Colchester and the village of Fordham. Fordham Heath has a primary school.
