= Wojciech Kucharski =

Polish sculptor and mason

Wojciech Kucharski (1741–1819) was a Polish sculptor and mason.

Kucharski is primarily known through his surviving works. In 1788, he made two stone basins for the St. Adalbert church in Jeleśnia.
