= Alexander Kucharsky =

Polish portrait painter (1741–1819)

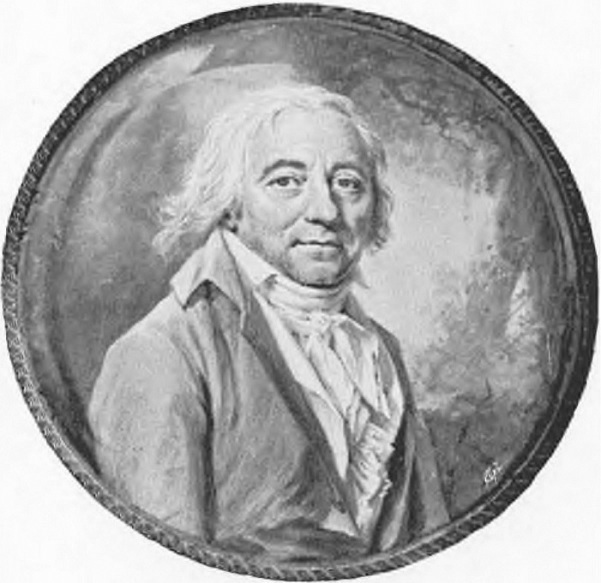
- Alexander Kucharski (1797)
- Born: Alexander Kucharsky; 18 March 1741; Warsaw, Poland
- Died: 5 November 1819 (aged 78); Paris, France
- Known for: Painter
- Notable work: Louis XVII of France; Countess of Artois
- Patrons: French court

Alexander Kucharsky (18 March 1741 – 5 November 1819) also Alexandre Kucharsky, was a Polish portrait painter who spent his adult life in France. He himself used the spelling Kucharsky, but Kucharski is also often used. In the past, in France, the name has been given as Couaski.

== Early life ==
Kucharsky was born in Warsaw. As a boy, he was a page to King Stanisław II Augustus, the last elected ruler of the Polish–Lithuanian Commonwealth. He trained first as an artist in Warsaw, in the studio of the famous painter Marcello Bacciarelli. With a bursary from King Stanisław Augustus, he then travelled to Paris to work under Joseph-Marie Vien and Carle van Loo at the Académie Royale, from 1760 to 1769.

== Work ==
The king of Poland wanted Kucharsky to train as a historical painter, but instead he became a portrait artist, thus losing the king's patronage. From 1776 to 1778, Kucharsky was in the service of the Princes de Condé.

Kucharsky liked to paint half-length portraits in pastels or in oils, but he also worked in gouache and sometimes painted miniatures. His clients were mostly from the French and Polish aristocracy. The latter had increased in numbers in France as a result of the alliance between King Louis XV and Marie Leszczyńska.

After the departure from the French court of Élisabeth-Louise Vigée-Le Brun in 1789, Kucharsky became painter to Queen Marie Antoinette. As well as painting her portrait and the royal children, he also painted Marie-Louise, princesse de Lamballe, the comte d'Artois, the countess of Artois, and Catherine the Great of Russia.

Kucharsky's best-known work today includes his portraits of the doomed French royal family, especially the future Louis XVII. The final portrait, painted in 1793 of Marie Antoinette, was sold at auction by Piasa on 21 May 2003 and is attributed to Kucharsky.

When signing his work, the artist used the spelling "Kucharsky".

== Later years ==
Throughout the years of the French Revolution, Kucharsky's allegiance remained with the ancien régime. In retirement he lived near Paris at Sainte-Périne, living on a pension granted by Louis XVIII. He died in Paris.

== Selected paintings ==
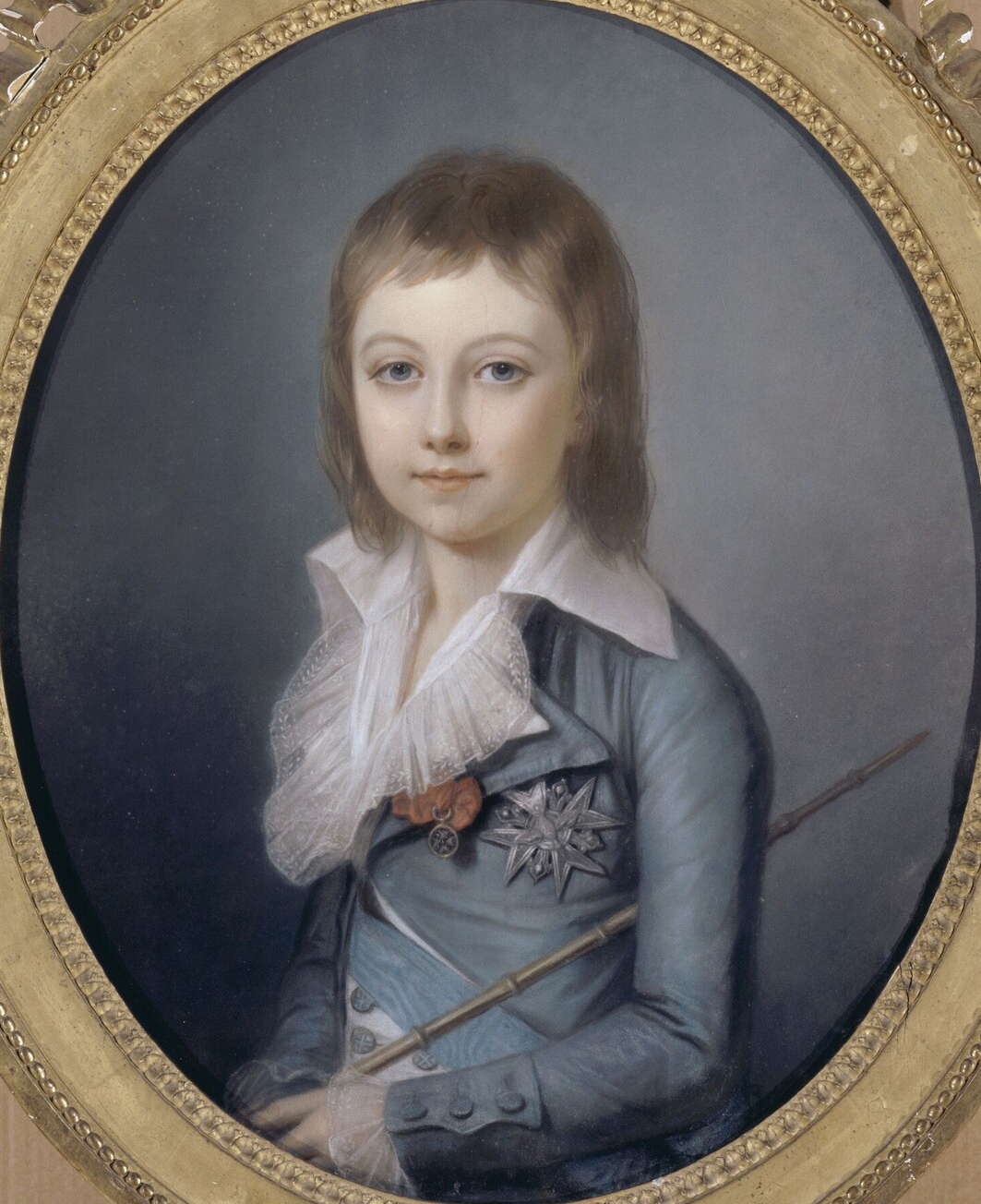
Louis Charles, Dauphin of France, 1789, now in the Palace of Versailles

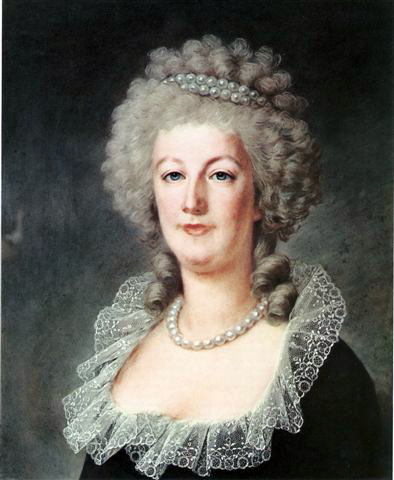
Marie Antoinette around 1790

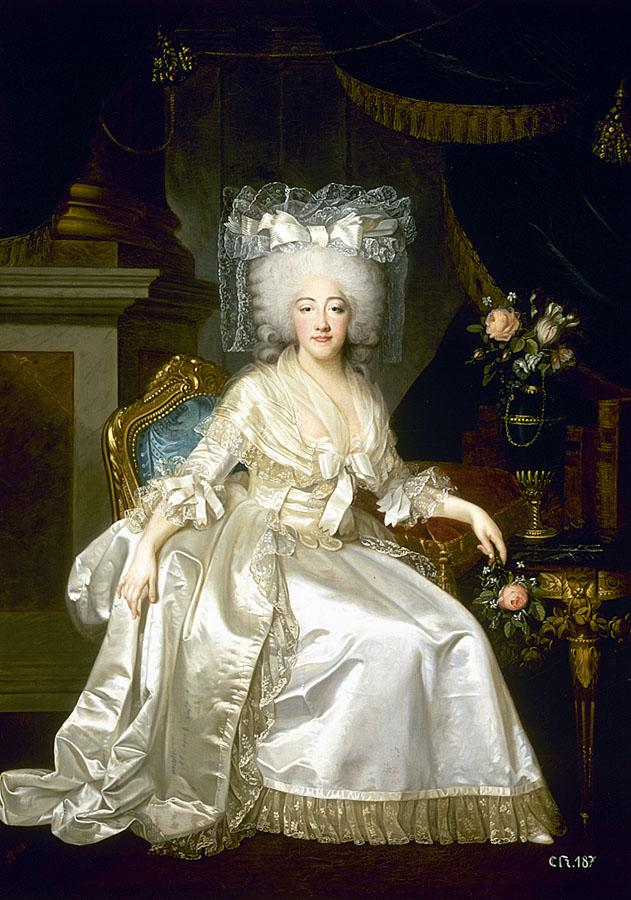
Marie Josephine Louise of Savoy

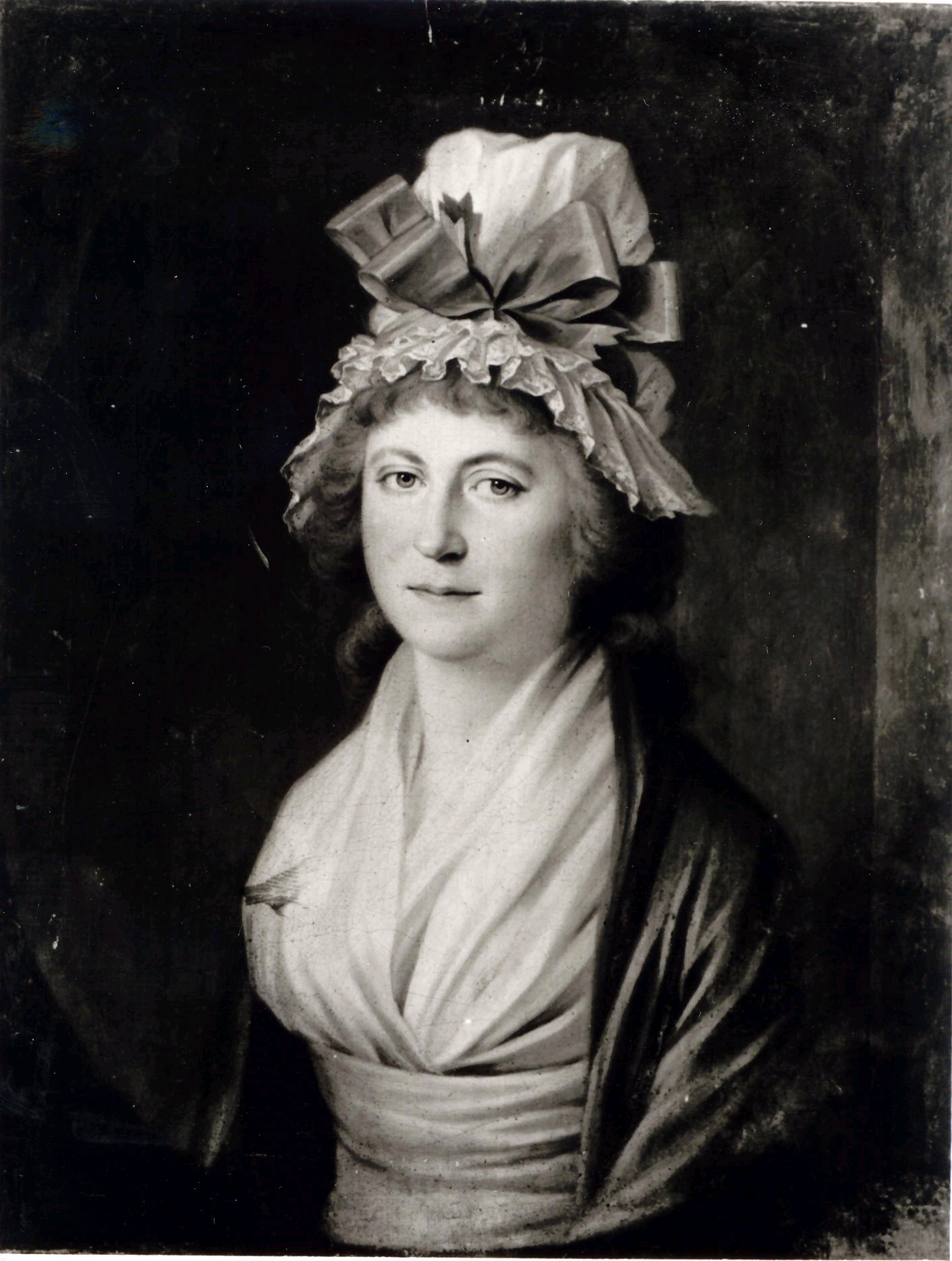
Portrait of a Woman (lost during Second World War)

== See also ==
- List of Polish painters
