= Francis Slater Rebow =

British Army officer and patron (1770–1845)

Francis Slater Rebow JP DL
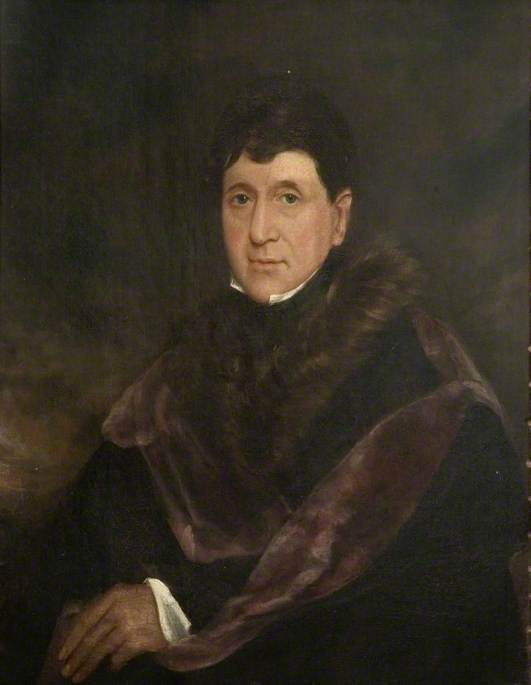
- Portrait by an unknown artist
- Born: Francis Slater; 1770; Derbyshire, England
- Died: 7 October 1845 (aged 75); Wivenhoe Park, Essex, England
- Burial place: St Mary's, Colchester
- Spouse: Mary Hester Rebow (m. 1796; died 1834)
- Children: 3
- Military career
- Allegiance: United Kingdom
- Branch: British Army
- Service years: 1787–1845
- Rank: General
- Units: 60th Regiment of Foot; 2nd Life Guards; 1st Life Guards
- Commands: Household Cavalry Brigade
- Known for: Patron of John Constable
- Conflicts: French Revolutionary Wars; West Indies Campaign; Battle of Martinique; Invasion of Guadeloupe (WIA); Napoleonic Wars; Peninsular War

General Francis Slater Rebow JP DL (born Francis Slater; 1770 – 7 October 1845) was a British Army officer and patron of the artist John Constable. Having joined the army in 1787, he served with the 60th Regiment of Foot in the West Indies, fighting at the start of the French Revolutionary Wars in the Battle of Martinique and Invasion of Guadeloupe, being severely wounded in the latter. In 1796 he returned home, marrying the daughter of Isaac Martin Rebow and taking the Rebow surname as his own.

Rebow transferred to the 2nd Life Guards in 1797 and continued to serve in England until promoted to major-general in 1812. At the end of the year he was given command of the Household Cavalry Brigade going out to fight in the Peninsular War. Rebow spent some time at Lisbon before returning home in January 1813; he received no further military commands but by seniority was promoted to general in 1841.

Rebow first commissioned Constable, whose father he was a friend of, to paint a portrait of his daughter Mary Martin Rebow in 1812. Rebow stayed in contact with Constable and in 1816 had him return to his estate at Wivenhoe Park to paint Wivenhoe Park, Essex and The Quarters behind Alresford Hall, which helped pay for Constable's marriage.

== Early life ==
Francis Slater was born in Derbyshire in 1770, the son of solicitor Richard Slater of Chesterfield, and his wife Catherine née Heaton. Slater had one brother, Gill, who became a midshipman in the Royal Navy, and a sister, Jane, who died the widow of a vicar in 1850.

== Military career ==
=== West Indies Campaign ===
Slater joined the British Army as an ensign in the newly raised 4th Battalion, 60th Regiment of Foot, on 14 November 1787. Towards the end of the following year he travelled with his regiment to serve in the West Indies. While there Slater purchased his promotion to lieutenant on 14 October 1789 and captain on 18 September 1792. Subsequent to this the French Revolutionary Wars began, with the 60th still in the West Indies. Slater, in command of the battalion's Grenadier Company, took part in the British expedition that set out to capture French island possessions there.

Slater fought at the successful Battle of Martinique between February and March 1794, and on 1 April was present at the capture of Saint Lucia. The expedition moved in the same month to attack Guadeloupe in the Invasion of Guadeloupe. During the initial fighting Slater was seriously wounded through both of his thighs and by the beginning of 1796 he had returned to England.

=== Return to England and marriage ===
In England Slater purchased his promotion to major, staying in the 60th, on 20 February and then on 22 March married Mary Hester Rebow (died 1834) in St Margaret's, Westminster. Rebow was the only child and heir of Colonel Isaac Martin Rebow of Wivenhoe Park; as part of the marriage Slater agreed to adjust his surname, becoming Francis Slater Rebow on 4 April by Royal Licence and taking the Rebow coat of arms as his own. In return he gained control of the Wivenhoe estate and received a large private income. The couple would go on to have three children together; a son who died in infancy, Mary Emma Rebow (died 1804), and Mary Martin Rebow (died 1842), the latter of whom married Sir Thomas Ormsby.

=== Life Guards ===
Rebow exchanged his commission into the 2nd Life Guards on 16 March 1797, serving in the unit as a supernumerary major. Part of the Household Cavalry Brigade, the 2nd Life Guards were a predominantly ceremonial regiment that had last seen active service half a century before at the Battle of Fontenoy in 1745.

Rebow was promoted to the rank of major and lieutenant-colonel (Note: Major and lieutenant-colonel was a rank unique to the Life Guards, with not even the other Household Cavalry regiment, the Royal Horse Guards, using it.) on 25 September 1799. When the appointment was announced in The London Gazette on 1 October it mistakenly recorded Rebow as becoming the regiment's second major instead of major and lieutenant-colonel, and this was not noticed. As such Rebow was promoted to lieutenant-colonel a second time on 29 April 1802 with the understanding that he was still only a major. The mistake was recognised by the War Office on 25 September that year and Rebow's rank was corrected, listing him as a major and lieutenant-colonel with seniority from 1799.

Having continued to serve in the 2nd Life Guards, on 20 August 1807 Rebow purchased a lieutenant-colonelcy within the 1st Life Guards. This was also a supernumerary position. He was then promoted to brevet colonel on 25 October 1809, serving with the 1st Life Guards until 1 January 1812 when he was promoted to major-general. (Note: Rebow continued to be listed as an officer of the 1st Life Guards until about 1818 when he was removed as a general officer receiving unattached pay.)

=== General officer ===
Rebow's first appointment as a general officer was to serve on the military staff of the Inland District. With the Napoleonic Wars ongoing, towards the end of the year the Prince Regent gave permission for the Household Cavalry Brigade to join General Lord Wellington's army in the Peninsular War. Command of the brigade was initially given to Major-General Terence O'Loghlin but he resigned under the grounds of ill health on 25 October. Rebow was chosen to take his place, assuming command on 28 November. The brigade contained squadrons from both regiments of Life Guards and the Royal Horse Guards. Wellington had previously requested that no new generals be sent out from England because they were "useless and only served to keep out men who were useful"; according to military historian Sir John Fortescue he was "disgusted" when Rebow and another cavalry general, Brigadier-General Henry Fane, were ordered out anyway.

The Household Cavalry Brigade had arrived in the Iberian Peninsula on 23 November. Quartered in Lisbon, Rebow began to prepare his regiments for wartime service. Unused to this, the colonel in command of the 2nd Life Guards and several of his officers threatened to resign. Rebow subsequently requested a leave of absence in mid-January 1813; he returned to England and received no further military duties, retiring to live at Wivenhoe Park. His abruptly ended period of command made him the shortest tenured of any general under Wellington during the Napoleonic Wars. He subsequently became a magistrate and deputy lieutenant for Essex, and through seniority was promoted to lieutenant-general on 17 May 1825 and general on 23 November 1841. Rebow died at Wivenhoe Park on 7 October 1845, aged 75, having had what military historians Ron McGuigan and Robert Burnham describe as an "unremarkable career". He was buried in St Mary's, Colchester.

== Patron of Constable ==
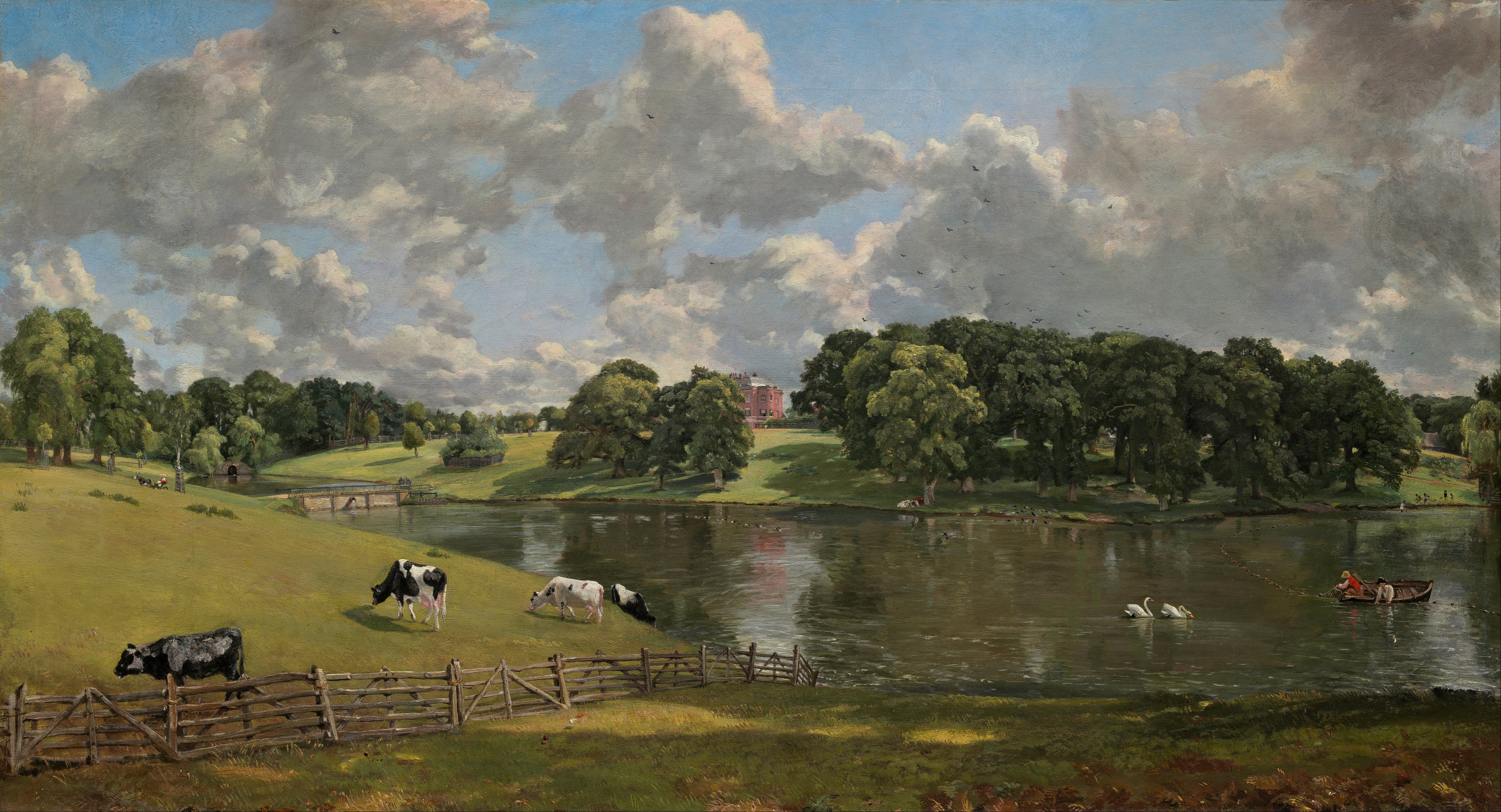
The painting Wivenhoe Park, Essex, commissioned from John Constable by Rebow - note his daughter driving a donkey cart on the far left bank of the river

Rebow is most commonly known for his patronage of the British artist John Constable rather than for his military endeavours. Rebow first contracted Constable, whose father he was a friend of, for a painting in September 1812. Rebow had him make a full-length portrait of his young daughter Mary Martin, for which Constable stayed at Wivenhoe between 6 and 22 September.

With the Napoleonic Wars over, in July 1816 Rebow had Constable return to Wivenhoe, and over the next two months the artist created two new works for him. These were Wivenhoe Park, Essex, and The Quarters, Alresford Hall, another property owned by Rebow. Both were complete by 17 September; the money from the commissions, as Rebow had intended, allowed Constable to marry his long-time sweetheart Maria Bicknell. Both pictures again focused on Rebow's daughter, who is pictured driving a donkey cart in the former, a painting that Rebow had Constable extend so that the full extent of Wivenhoe Park could be included. Constable wrote to Bicknell on 30 August describing the Rebows:

I feel entirely comfortable with them, because I know them to be sincere people - and though of family and in the highest degree refined, they are not at all people of the world...

Constable stayed in contact with Rebow after this, returning to Wivenhoe in August 1817 where he made two drawings. In August 1819 Rebow corresponded with Constable about having the artist visit again to paint a group portrait of the Rebow family. While Constable intended to fulfil the engagement, Rebow evinced doubts that he would be able to find the time for the painting to be completed because of a busy social schedule, and as no such portrait survives or is recorded it is likely that Constable never visited Wivenhoe to begin it. Rebow is described by art historians Leslie Parris and Ian Fleming-Williams as a more sympathetic patron of Constable than others such as Richard Benyon De Beauvoir.

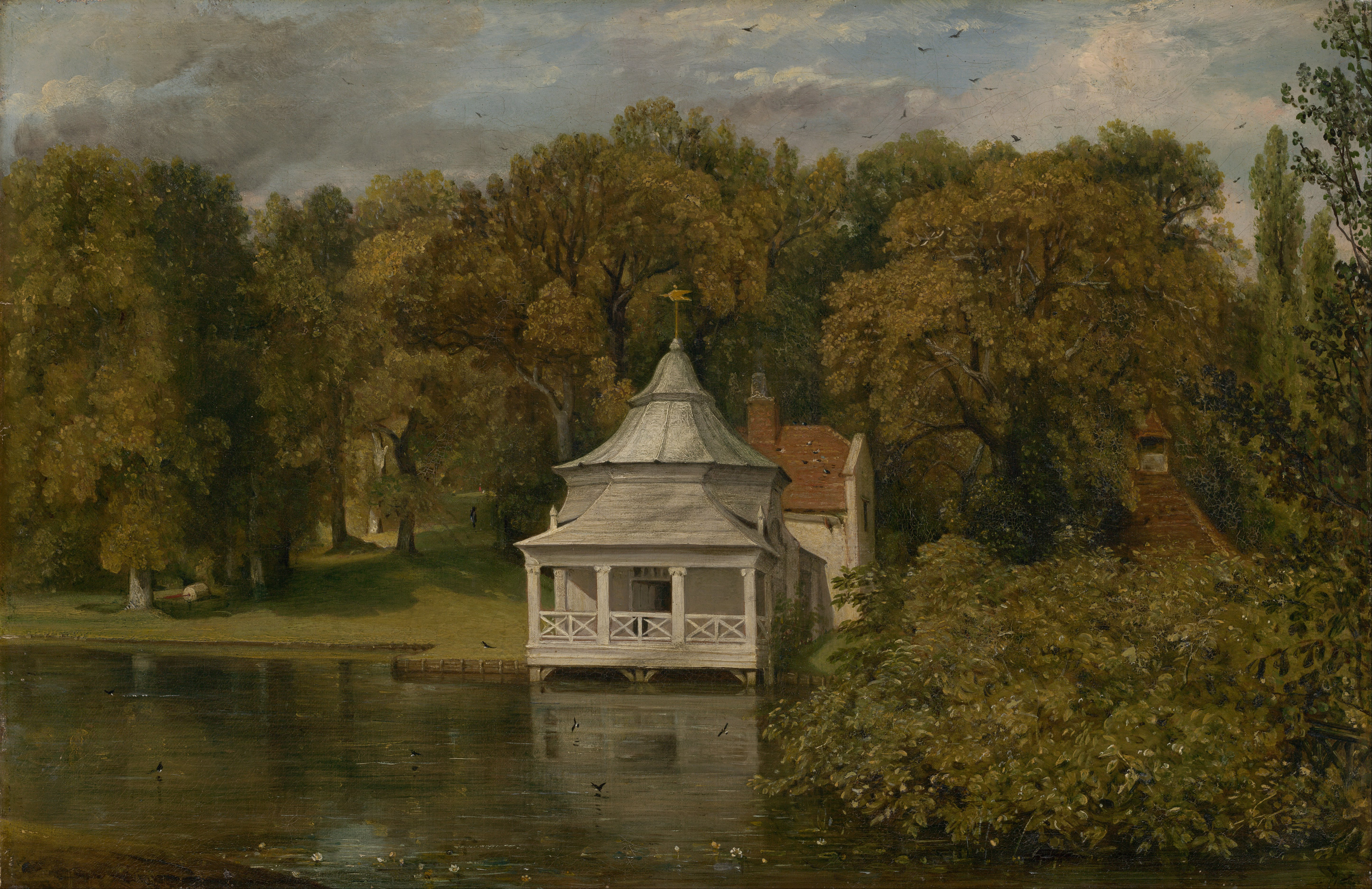
Constable's The Quarters behind Alresford Hall, also commissioned by Rebow
