= Carlo Antonio Porporati =

Italian painter (1741–1816)

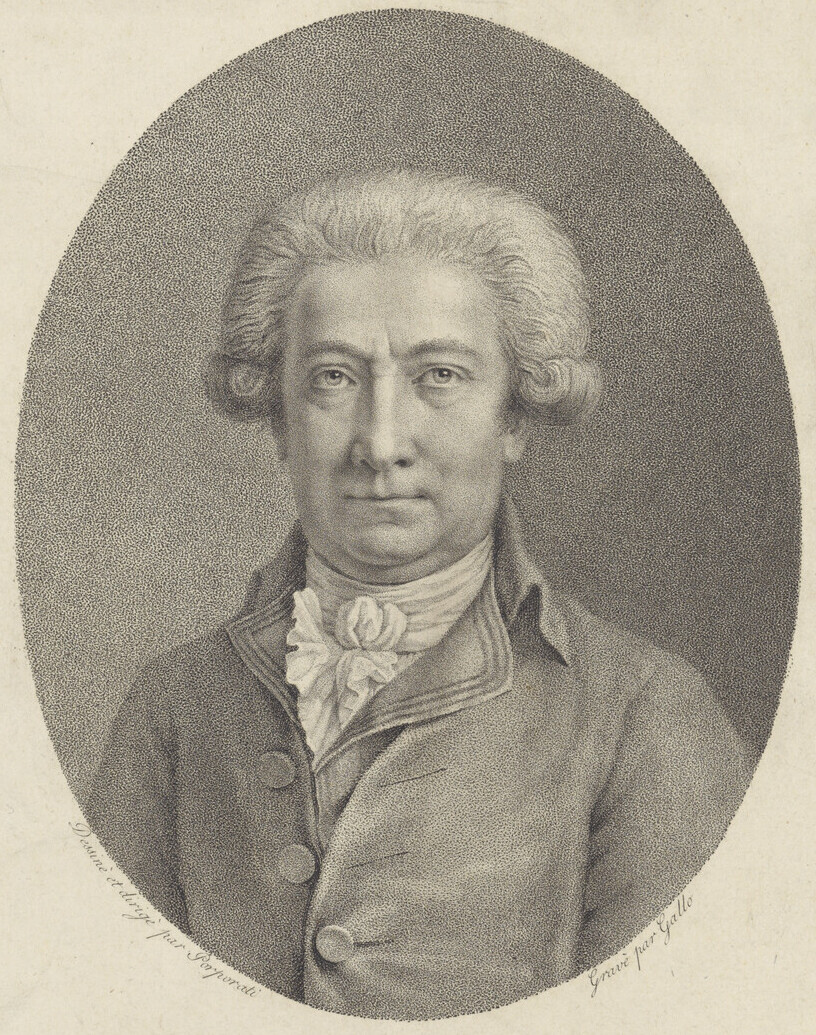
Carlo Antonio Porporati, self-portrait

Carlo Antonio Porporati (Volvera, 18 November 1741 – Turin, 16 June 1816) was an Italian engraver and painter.

Born in Volvera, near Turin, he came to Paris as young boy, and became a pupil of Juste Chevillet, Beauvarlet and Johann Georg Wille. He engraved religious subjects and portraits with a burin in the black manner. The National Gallery of Florence has a portrait and genre scenes painted by him. On May 8, 1773, he was inducted into the Royal Academy of Artists in Paris, and for his reception piece he painted a Susannah at the Bath, a copy after Santerre. In the same year he was admitted to membership of the Turin Academy, and in 1797 appointed conservator of the Gallery.

In 1776, he engraved Adam and Eve before the corpse of Abel, original by Adriaen van der Werff ( painting from the cabinet of the Savoyard King of Sardinia, later in the Museum of Turin). The engraving states he is involved of the designs for the King. The engraving is dedicated to Marie Joséphine of Savoy (1753-1810), wife of the Count of Provence, brother of Louis XVI, and future King Louis XVIII (personal collection).

In 1793, he is commissioned by the king, founded a school of engraving at Naples, where he had lived for four years, and would remain as a teacher. While he painted portraits, engraving was his forte.

== List of works ==
1. Susannah at the Bath; after Santerre.
2. Tancred and Clorinda; after Carle van Loo.
3. Le Coucher; after Carle van Loo.
4. Erminia asking shelter of a Shepherd; after Carle van Loo.
5. Cupid in Meditation; after Angelica Kauffman.
6. The Death of Abel; after Adriaen van der Werff.
7. Venus caressing Cupid; after Pompeo Batoni.
8. Jupiter and Leda; after Correggio.
9. The Madonna with the Rabbit;after Correggio.
10. Leda and the Swan;after Correggio.
11. Leda bathing; after Correggio.
12. La Zingarella; after Correggio.
13. The young Girl with a Dog; after Greuze.
14. Portrait of Charles Emmanuel III.
15. Portrait of Queen Marie Antoinette.
16. Portrait of the Empress Marie Louise.
17. Abraham sending away Hagar; after Phillip Van Dyke
18. Paris and Enone : after van der Werff. (mezzotint)
19. The Compassionate Priestess; after Gibelin. (mezzotint)
20. Portrait of Marie-Antoinette in her last jail - 16 October 1793
