= Wivenhoe Park (painting) =

Painting by John Constable

Wivenhoe Park, Essex
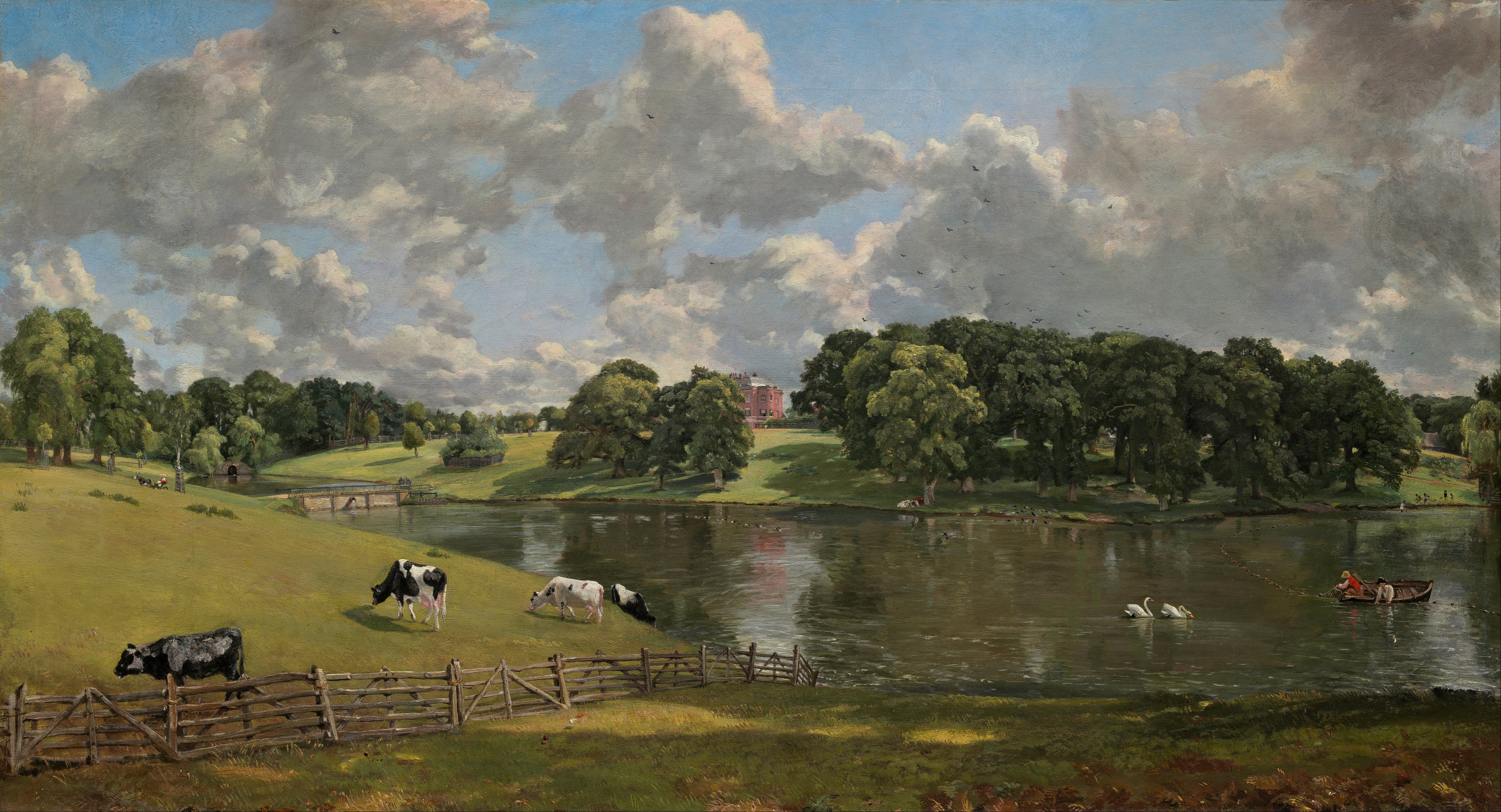
- Artist: John Constable
- Year: 1816
- Medium: Oil on canvas
- Dimensions: 56.1 cm × 101.2 cm (22.1 in × 39.8 in)
- Location: National Gallery of Art, Washington, D.C., USA
- Accession: 1942.9.10

Wivenhoe Park is a painting of an English landscape park, the estate of the Rebow family, by the English Romantic painter, John Constable (1776–1837).

John Constable was born in Suffolk, and is known principally for his landscape paintings, especially the landscapes of the countryside where he spent his childhood. His paintings are now considered among the most popular and valuable in British art.

== Painting ==
The National Gallery of Art holds this painting as one of its highlights:

A pleasant sense of ease and harmony pervades this landscape of almost photographic clarity. The large areas of brilliant sunshine and cool shade, the rambling line of the fence, and the beautiful balance of trees, meadow, and river [actually a lake] are evidence of the artist's creative synthesis of the actual site.

The painting was commissioned by the owner of Wivenhoe Park, Major General Francis Slater Rebow, who was among the artist's first patrons, being a close friend of the artist's father, Golding Constable. Wivenhoe Park is 200 acres (81 ha) of parkland, near the town of Colchester, Essex, not far from Constable's homeland in the Stour valley. It is now the campus of the University of Essex. The park was purchased by the Rebow family before 1734. Slater-Rebow commissioned several paintings from Constable, including a portrait of the general's seven-year-old daughter in 1812. She also figures in this painting, in a donkey cart to the left. This painting, finished in September 1816, earned the artist enough money to allow him to marry his long-time love, Mary Bicknell. They married in October 1816.

Constable's art is always penetrated by longing, melancholy and a yearning for the simple, natural life, for a bucolic, pastoral idyll, to rural subjects and aspects of life in the countryside, a "golden age" when people lived together in harmony with nature, a world on its way of disappearing when he painted his landscapes thanks to the effects of the Industrial Revolution. He was aware of the issue of urban growth, of urban life's unpleasantness, which he contrasted to life in the countryside. Constable's art was rather unconventional for his time, and he loved simple things, a natural landscape without the ruins, dramatic effects or exalted, often excessive feelings, like the ones displayed in the paintings of his contemporary, J. M. W. Turner. His landscapes are flooded by a silvery brilliant light in the water and air and in the sky, and are characterised by a special intensity that is such an important feature of this artist's works. Whereas his earlier paintings (e.g. Malvern Hall, 1809) tend to show more simple and symmetrical features, this painting shows Constable's turn to more sophisticated and complicated compositions.

== In popular culture ==
In the video game Lethal Company, at the Manor interior map, this paint can be viewed by the player at some of the walls, behind a big window frame.

External videos
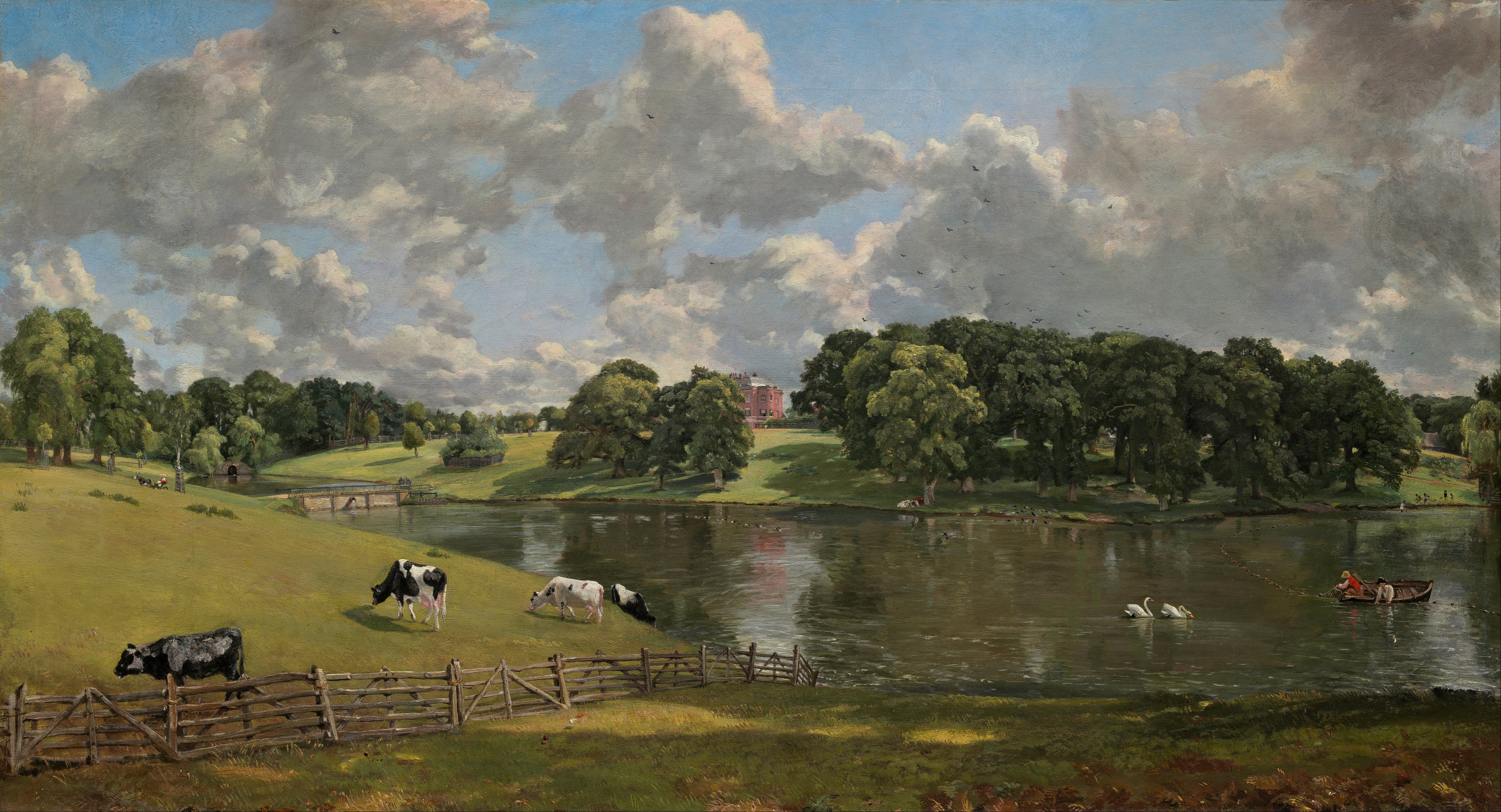
- Wivenhoe Park
- Constable A Country Rebel BBC Documentary 2014

== See also ==
- List of paintings by John Constable
