= Thomas Hardy (Royal Navy officer, died 1732) =

British Royal Navy officer and politician (1666–1732)

Rear-Admiral Sir Thomas Hardy
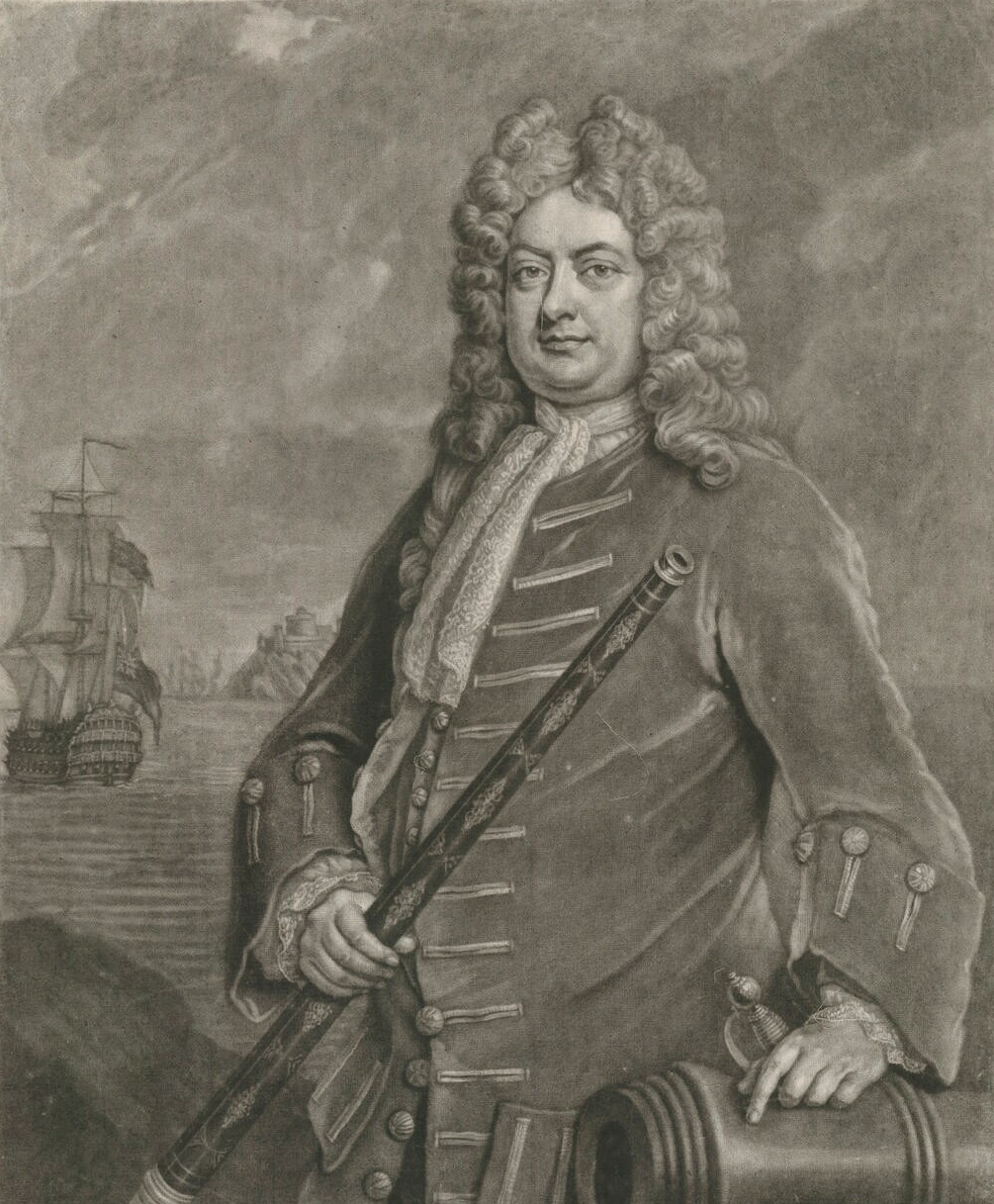
- Born: 13 September 1666; Jersey
- Died: 16 August 1732 (aged 65)
- Burial place: Westminster Abbey
- Spouse: Constance Hook
- Relatives: Sir Charles Hardy (cousin)
- Military career
- Allegiance: Kingdom of Great Britain
- Branch: Royal Navy
- Service years: 1688–1716
- Rank: Rear-admiral
- Commands: HMS Charles; HMS Swallow Prize; HMS Pendennis; HMS Deal Castle; HMS Coventry; HMS Pembroke; HMS Bedford; HMS Kent; HMS Albemarle; HMS Royal Sovereign; HMS Russell; The Nore
- Conflicts: Nine Years' War; Battle of Barfleur; War of the Spanish Succession; Battle of Cádiz; Battle of Vigo Bay; Battle of Málaga; Siege of Ostend; Capture of Minorca; Great Northern War
- Awards: Knight bachelor
- Other work: High Sheriff of Dorset; MP for Weymouth and Melcombe Regis; Master of Trinity House

Rear-Admiral Sir Thomas Hardy (13 September 1666 – 16 August 1732) was a British Royal Navy officer and politician. Having joined the navy sometime before 1688, Hardy was supported in his career by George Churchill, whom he served as first lieutenant during the Battle of Barfleur in 1692. Promoted to captain in 1693, Hardy served in the Channel Islands and off the coast of England until 1702, when he was given command of HMS Pembroke off the coast of Spain. He fought at the Battle of Cádiz, and subsequently discovered the location of the Franco-Spanish fleet through the intervention of his chaplain, which resulted in the Battle of Vigo Bay. Hardy was knighted for his services.

Having commanded several ships in the Mediterranean Fleet, in 1706 Hardy was given command of a small squadron in the west of the English Channel tasked with protecting arriving merchant ships. In 1707 Hardy was sent as escort to a 200-ship convoy sailing for Lisbon. While conveying the ships he met with the squadron of René Duguay-Trouin in late August, chasing him until dusk before returning to shepherd the convoy. Hardy returned to England in September and was court martialled in the following month for not fully engaging Duguay-Trouin. He was acquitted but was further investigated by a panel from the Admiralty and committees of the Houses of Commons and Lords, which again exonerated him.

Hardy became first captain to Sir John Leake in the Mediterranean in 1708, assisting in the transport of Elisabeth Christine of Brunswick-Wolfenbüttel to Spain for her marriage to the important British ally Archduke Charles, and participating in the capture of Cagliari and assault on Minorca. In 1711 he was promoted to rear-admiral and given command of a squadron to blockade Dunkirk. Pushed off station by a storm, he was unable to stop a force of privateers from escaping and destroying a British convoy. After briefly serving as commander-in-chief, the Nore, Thames and Medway Hardy commanded a squadron off Ushant where he failed to intercept the squadrons of Duguay-Trouin and Jean-Baptiste du Casse in 1712. In 1715 he was second-in-command of the Baltic Fleet sent to serve in the Great Northern War. He was dismissed in 1716, possibly for being supportive of Jacobitism.

== Naval career ==
=== Early service ===
Thomas Hardy was born on Jersey on 13 September 1666. (Note: Dates are in Old Style. The naval historian John Charnock instead records Hardy as from Guernsey.) He was the son of John le Hardy, Solicitor-General of Jersey, whose father had held the same position. Coming from a naval-minded family, Hardy's first cousin was the future Vice-Admiral Sir Charles Hardy. Hardy himself joined the Royal Navy sometime before 1688, at which time he was serving as a captain's clerk to Captain George Churchill, who would go on to support Hardy in his rise through the service. By 1692 Hardy had been promoted to lieutenant, and was serving as the first lieutenant of Churchill's 96-gun ship of the line (Note: The number of guns refers to the number of long guns a ship was established to carry on its decks. Ships of the line, especially first-rates like St Andrew, were the strongest ships of the navy and expected to fight in the line of battle.) HMS St Andrew. With the Nine Years' War ongoing, he fought at the Battle of Barfleur, between 19 and 24 May.

=== Initial commands ===
On 6 January 1693 Hardy was promoted to captain and given command of the 6-gun fireship HMS Charles. In May he moved to the 18-gun frigate HMS Swallow Prize. In Swallow Prize Hardy served in the Channel Islands protecting Guernsey merchant ships from French privateers. In 1695 and 1696 he served a term as High Sheriff of Dorset. In September 1695 he was transferred into the brand new 48-gun ship of the line HMS Pendennis, which he commissioned in 1696. Serving in Captain John Benbow's squadron, he sailed from Norway protecting a convoy of ships carrying masts in October. He continued in command of Pendennis until the end of the Nine Years' War in September 1697. Hardy's next command came in May 1698 when he joined the 20-gun frigate HMS Deal Castle. This began a streak of changes in command for Hardy, with him moving to the 50-gun ship of the line HMS Coventry in April 1701 and the 60-gun ship of the line HMS Pembroke in January 1702.

With the War of the Spanish Succession ongoing, in Pembroke Hardy formed part of Admiral Sir George Rooke's Grand Alliance fleet off the coast of Spain. Pembroke subsequently fought at the Battle of Cádiz, an attempt to capture Cádiz from the Spanish so that it could not be used as a base by French fleets. Rooke's fleet arrived on 12 August, with the landings beginning three days later. Pembroke and the 70-gun ship of the line HMS Lenox bombarded the fort guarding the landing location, and the Anglo-Dutch army successfully got ashore. On 25 August Pembroke was the lead ship in a probe far into the Bay of Cádiz, sailing close enough to the shore that the ship ran aground at one point. The fortifications of Cádiz proved too strong, and the army re-embarked between 15 and 16 September.

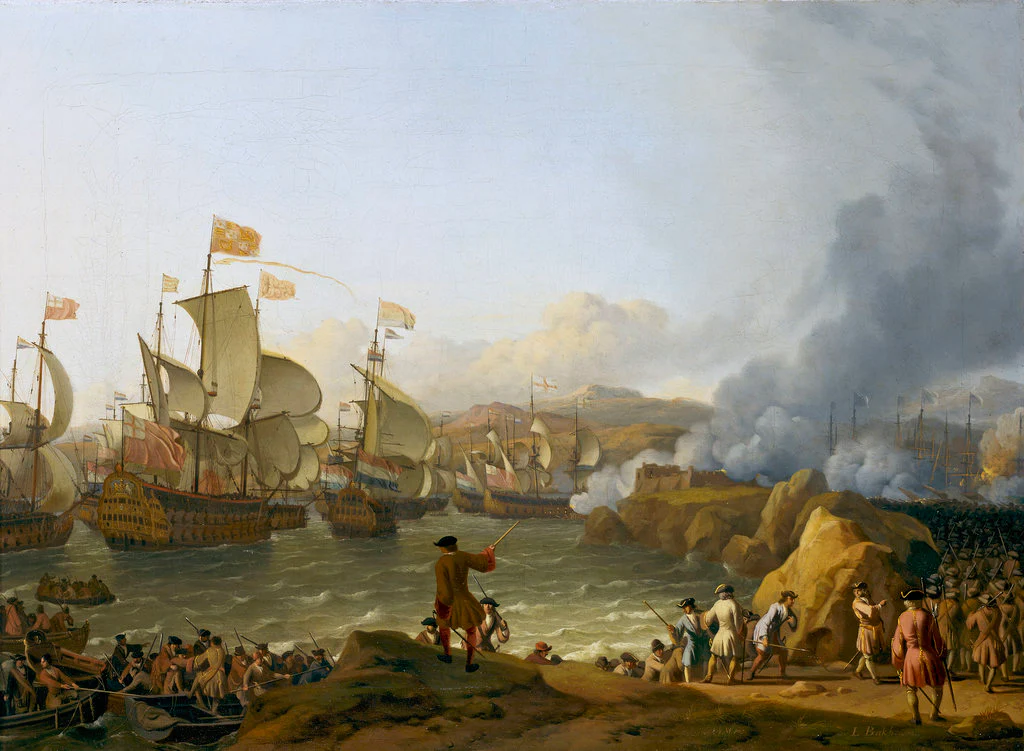
The Battle of Vigo Bay, for the result of which Hardy was knighted

After Cádiz Pembroke joined a squadron of Rooke's fleet commanded by Captain James Wishart. The squadron subsequently sailed to Lagos in Portugal to take on supplies of water. There Hardy's chaplain, also from Jersey, went ashore and was assumed by the locals to be French. The French consul boasted to him that the Spanish treasure fleet, commanded by Vice-Admiral François Louis Rousselet de Châteaurenault, had recently arrived from the West Indies and was sheltering off Vigo.

The location of the Franco-Spanish fleet was passed by Hardy to Rooke on 6 October, who in response sailed the fleet to Vigo. There they fought the successful Battle of Vigo Bay on 12 October, capturing or destroying the entire enemy fleet. After the battle Rooke gave Hardy the duty of sailing to England with news of the victory. He was rewarded with a knighthood by Queen Anne on 31 October. The biographer Stephen Leake wrote of Hardy in this period that he was "so ignorant of sea affairs that he did not know one rope from another", a claim that the historian John Charnock rebuffs. In January 1703 Hardy was given a new command, the 70-gun ship of the line HMS Bedford.

=== Mediterranean service ===
Bedford was sent to serve in the Mediterranean Fleet under Admiral Sir Cloudesley Shovell. While sailing out to the Mediterranean with Shovell's fleet Hardy was given command of a squadron of four ships (Note: Squadron: Bedford, Pembroke, the 60-gun ship of the line HMS Montagu, and 20-gun frigate HMS Lizard) to gather information at Lagos. The Portuguese there were unable to provide Hardy with any intelligence of French movements, but did inform him of the size of the French fleet in Toulon. Hardy's subsequent service in the Mediterranean was unnotable, apart from his capture of a "valuable ship" sailing from Santo Domingo. In October Hardy took a squadron of three ships (Note: Squadron: Bedford, Lizard, and the 80-gun ship of the line HMS Somerset) to Tangier, Morocco, to present some diplomatic papers, while the rest of Shovell's fleet returned to England. Having completed his task Hardy also sailed home, arriving at Plymouth on 12 November.

Hardy sailed again with the Mediterranean Fleet, this time under Rooke, in January 1704. Forming part of a squadron commanded by Rear-Admiral Thomas Dilkes, Bedford cruised off the Tagus in March. Dilkes subsequently received word of a Spanish force nearby, and on 12 March the squadron attacked and captured two enemy warships and an armed merchant ship, (Note: The 60-gun ships of the line Porta Coeli and Santa Teresa, and the 24-gun merchant ship San Nicholas) although the surrender occurred before Hardy could reach the fight. Hardy was also not present at the capture of Gibraltar in early August, but on 13 August Bedford formed part of the force that fought the Battle of Málaga, fighting in the centre division of the fleet and having seventy-four casualties from a total crew complement of around 460.

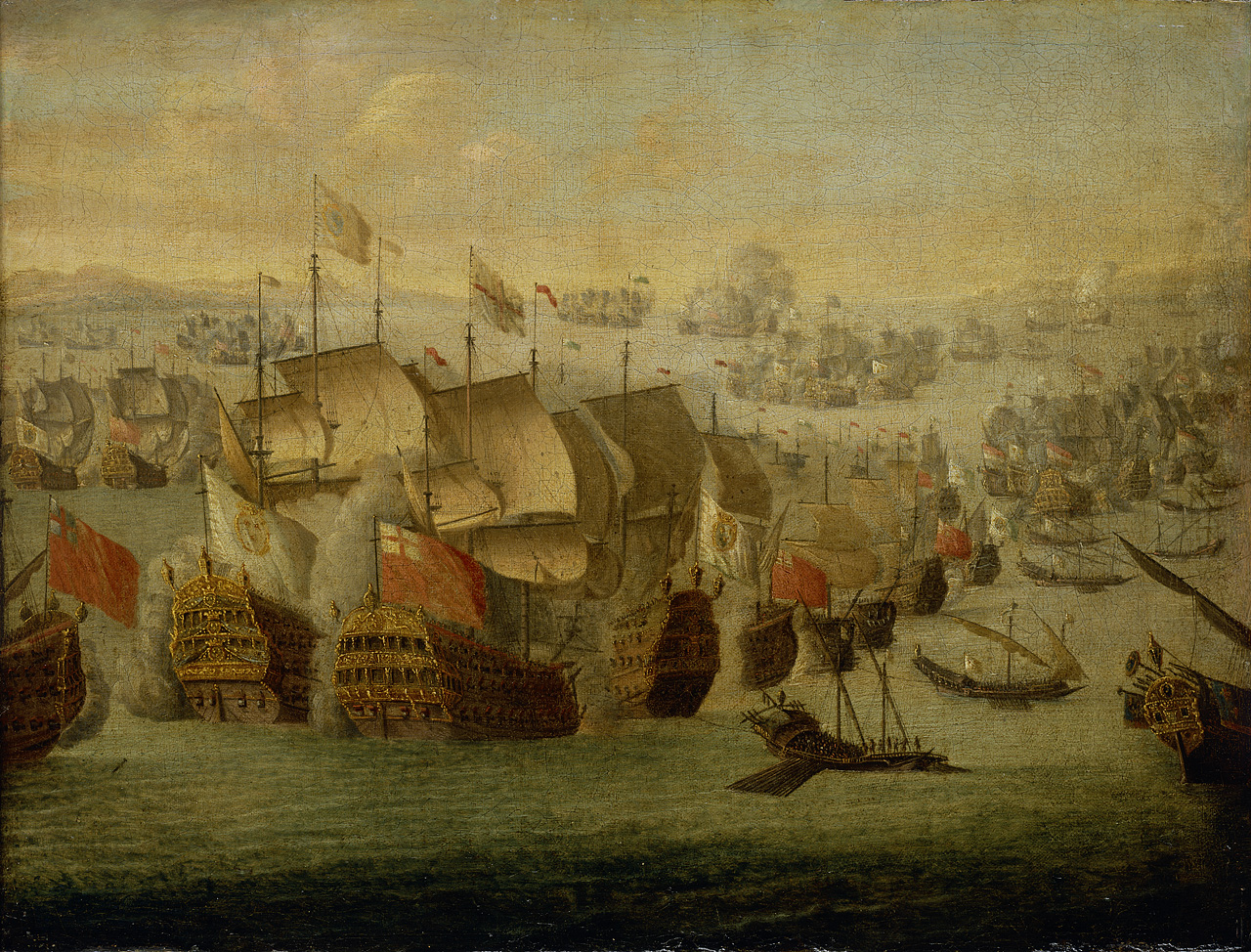
The Battle of Málaga

Vice-Admiral Sir John Leake took command in the Mediterranean in 1705, and Hardy joined him in February, again serving in Dilkes's squadron. Towards the end of the year Hardy returned to England and left Bedford. He was appointed to the 70-gun ship of the line HMS Kent on 13 December. In summer 1706 Kent was attached to a squadron commanded by Vice-Admiral Sir Stafford Fairborne in the Bay of Biscay. It subsequently participated in the successful siege of Ostend between June and July.

=== Squadron command ===
In October 1706 Hardy was appointed a commodore and given command of a small squadron (Note: Squadron: Kent, the 80-gun HMS Devonshire, 70-gun HMS Northumberland and HMS Nassau, and 64-gun HMS Mary and HMS Canterbury) with which to protect merchant ships travelling through the Bay of Biscay and to the west of the English Channel. Ten days after assuming command of his squadron, Hardy captured a well-known French 20-gun privateer that had itself recently captured two British merchant ships. Hardy continued in command of his squadron into 1707, contending with the poor weather in the area and occasionally escorting convoys from Ireland to England. Present in the same area was René Duguay-Trouin's marauding French squadron that had begun patrolling the Channel in June, but Duguay-Trouin moved to the coast of Portugal soon afterwards, leaving Hardy's position safe for incoming shipping.

==== Convoy escort ====
On 13 June Hardy was appointed as escort to a convoy of around 200 merchant ships intended for Lisbon, with an expanded squadron. (Note: Squadron staying with Hardy: Kent, Northumberland, Mary, Nassau Devonshire, Canterbury, 54-gun ship of the line HMS Hampshire, 60-gun ship of the line HMS Auguste, 32-gun frigate HMS Tartar, and 8-gun fireship HMS Hunter. Continuing on to Portugal: 64-gun ship of the line HMS Defiance, 80-gun ship of the line HMS Cambridge, and 32-gun frigate HMS Poole To Newfoundland: 48-gun frigate HMS Advice and 18-gun frigate HMS Advice Prize To New England: 54-gun ship of the line HMS Reserve To the Leeward Islands: 42-gun frigate HMS Hector, 24-gun frigate HMS Margate, and fireship HMS Vulture) Before Hardy could sail with the convoy his orders were modified, with his convoy expanded to protect shipping going to other locations as well. This was in response to a fear that Duguay-Trouin was still in the Channel. Hardy was to stay with the convoy until it was safely away from the Channel, and then protect shipping returning from Portugal, with his orders being updated every ten days from Plymouth. Other parts of his squadron would continue on with the different sections of the convoy to their final destinations. The convoy sailed from Spithead in the first week of July.

With the winds against them the convoy made slow progress down the Channel, finally clearing it only on 24 August. With some ships having already left the fleet, Hardy had 150 merchant ships and 30 military store ships left to convoy. In the meantime Duguay-Trouin had returned to the Channel, having been unproductive off Portugal. On 27 August Hardy and the convoy were sailing off the Lizard. There they encountered Duguay-Trouin's six-ship squadron. Hardy initially set sail to attack the French force as his orders required, but after several hours of chase he decided to return to close escort of the convoy, in fear that the French would avoid him in the night and destroy the convoy while he was parted from it. This decision was made through a council of war, with fourteen captains signing the agreement to discontinue the chase. (Note: The council of war also thought it unlikely they would be able to catch the French squadron.) With Hardy in attendance the convoy sailed unmolested, reaching the point at which Hardy could leave them to continue their journey on 30 August.

Hardy then began to fulfil the second part of his orders, patrolling off the Scilly Isles to protect returning merchant ships. They occasionally caught sight of French privateers, but these vessels stayed at a safe distance from Hardy's squadron which was slowed by heavy biological growth on their hulls. On the evening of 10 September Hardy's ships sighted the French squadron of Rear-Admiral Claude de Forbin as it made a circuitous return from capturing British and Dutch merchant ships in the White Sea. Hardy thought he had encountered Duguay-Trouin again. Hardy formed line of battle and began a chase of Forbin, but the French force was far ahead of him and by the morning of 11 September he had lost contact with them. One of Hardy's ships, the 60-gun ship of the line HMS Canterbury, encountered Forbin later on 11 September, but the French ignored the vessel, entering Brest, France, on 13 September.

==== Court martial ====
In mid-September the squadron returned to Torbay, where it was split up variously for refits and redeployments. The Lord High Admiral, Prince George of Denmark, subsequently charged Hardy with "neglect of duty" for not continuing to chase Duguay-Trouin's squadron. He was court martialled at Portsmouth on 10 October. Hardy argued that his actions were more appropriate than "to continue an uncertain chase which might give the enemy an opportunity of getting by and falling in with [the convoy] after separation". The court, headed by Leake, (Note: Seven captains made up the rest of the court: Hovenden Walker, Henry Lumley, Stephen Martin, Thomas Meads, Henry Gore, Charles Stewart, and John Paul.) fully acquitted him from blame, saying that Hardy had complied with his orders to chase any French force he fell in with, and had reacted sensibly to return to the convoy.

While the court martial was ongoing Duguay-Trouin continued to harry British merchant ships in the Channel, incensing the Cabinet who considered Hardy at fault for not stopping him. In November the Admiralty was ordered to review Hardy's case. A panel of admirals discussed the acquittal, and decreed that the result of an honourable court martial should be upheld. (Note: The admirals who examined the acquittal were: Churchill, Leake, Fairborne, Wishart, Lord High Admiral Prince George of Denmark, Vice-Admiral Sir George Byng, and Rear-Admiral Sir John Norris.) Despite this result, Hardy's actions had upset the powerful merchant community and the Whig Junto that was attempting to bring down Hardy's patron Churchill, who was serving on the Lord High Admirals Council. Hardy was brought before committees of the House of Lords and House of Commons, to be further investigated as a "test case" on the results of failures to protect merchant ships.

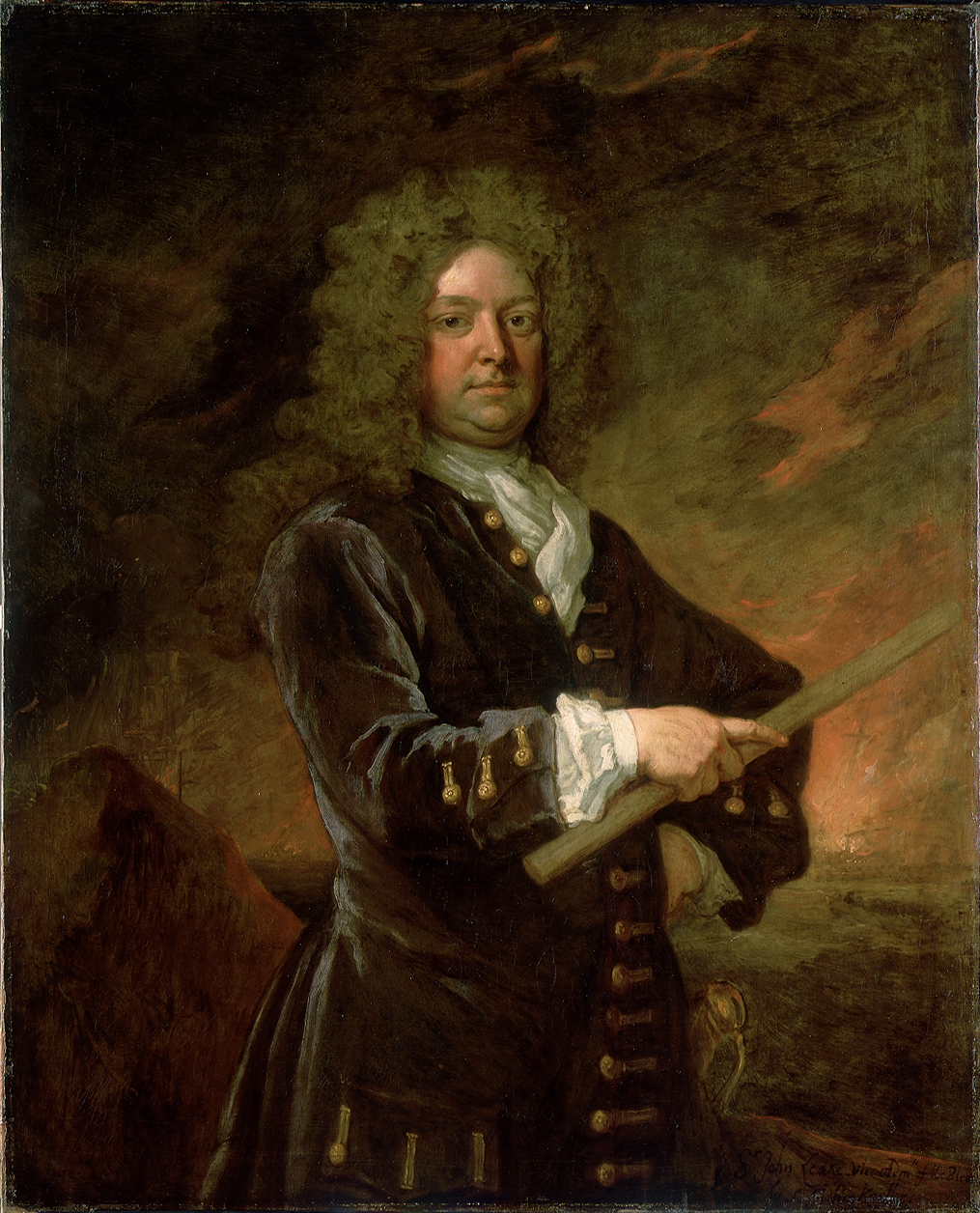
Sir John Leake, whom Hardy frequently served under

The House of Commons committee brought forward Hardy's court martial papers to be examined on 22 November, but the evidence was found by Hardy's accusers to be unsuitable to challenge the earlier decision, and debate on the matter was quickly dropped. Hardy left Kent in January 1708. His examination before the House of Lords in February was more in-depth and included the extra charge of refusing to convoy a merchant ship from Plymouth to Portsmouth, but Hardy was again acquitted of blame. Since he had already been found innocent at his court martial, the parliamentary investigations were widely denounced as "un-English".

=== Return to service ===
Leake, influenced by Churchill, subsequently demonstrated his support of Hardy by appointing him as first captain of his flagship for the Mediterranean, the 90-gun ship of the line HMS Albemarle. (Note: Charnock describes the friendship between Leake and Hardy as "too affectionate to exist, except between men most truly, and cordially attached to each other".) Despite this sign of naval approval, Hardy's appointment was not embraced by many of Leake's inner circle, who thought him "unpopular, a coward, and an incompetent seaman". The fleet sailed from England on 6 February, but Hardy only joined it after it had reached Lisbon.

From Lisbon the fleet travelled to Barcelona, Spain, whence Hardy was sent to the court of Elisabeth Christine of Brunswick-Wolfenbüttel at Vado. Elizabeth Christine was the intended wife of Britain's ally Archduke Charles of the Holy Roman Empire, who was fighting for the kingship of Spain. Hardy coordinated Elizabeth Christine's planned move to Spain with Leake's fleet. He returned on 9 June, at which point Leake moved out of Albemarle and left Hardy in command of the ship. With Albemarle Hardy was given five other ships (Note: Squadron: Four ships of the line and a yacht) with which to embark Elizabeth Christine. He completed this on 2 July; the fleet conveyed her to Barcelona, where she and Charles married.

The fleet afterwards captured Cagliari, the capital of Sardinia, on 1 August before sailing to Minorca, which it blockaded. Soon after an allied army arrived to assault the island; Leake split off part of his fleet to assist with this, and sailed for England with the remainder, including Hardy, on 19 September. They arrived off Portland on 15 October. Continuing with Leake now in the English Channel, in December Hardy was appointed to his flagship the 100-gun ship of the line HMS Royal Sovereign, moving with Leake in May 1709 to the 80-gun ship of the line HMS Russell. They both left Russell in July. In 1710 Hardy became an elder brother of Trinity House.

=== Flag rank ===
On 27 January 1711 Hardy was promoted to rear-admiral of the blue. (Note: Hardy's elevation was done in tandem with that of Hovenden Walker, who became a rear-admiral of the white. The Admiralty considered the two to be "one promotion".) In April he fought a by-election to become Member of Parliament for Weymouth and Melcombe Regis as a Tory, and upon petition was granted the seat on 22 May. His naval duties would mean that he spent little time in parliament. In this period Hardy was also given command of a squadron (Note: Squadron: Canterbury, 70-gun ship of the line HMS Berwick, 48-gun ship of the line HMS Romney, one other ship of the line, and four frigates) to blockade Dunkirk, France, with Canterbury as his flagship. While cruising he captured a French merchant ship, as it attempted to sail to Newfoundland, around 26 April.

The squadron arrived off Dunkirk on 21 May, driving two 20-gun privateers and an 8-gun dogger into the port. At Dunkirk a French privateer squadron was fitting out to sail, and Hardy was tasked with ensuring that it did not escape, and to intercept a convoy that was expected to arrive there from Brittany. While there he captured several small privateers. His squadron was sometime afterwards blown off station and forced to shelter in Yarmouth Roads. There on 8 August Hardy was ordered to escort a convoy destined for Russia as far as the Orkney Islands. He sailed with the ships as far as the Shetland Isles and then returned to England. From there he was sent to search for the French squadron of Jean-Baptiste du Casse, who managed to escape him. Hardy was then finally able to re-start his blockade of Dunkirk, having been told that the squadron there was ready to leave. However, before he reached Dunkirk the French escaped and captured sixteen out of twenty-two ships sailing in a convoy from Virginia, although Hardy was not blamed for this.

Hardy was discussed but eventually discarded as a candidate to lead the Quebec Expedition, an attempt to capture Quebec with a fleet of warships and troopships. His squadron arrived at Plymouth on 23 October, Hardy having instead on 6 October been made commander-in-chief, the Nore, Thames and Medway. He continued in that command until the start of 1712. In January 1712 Hardy was given a new squadron, (Note: Squadron consisted of six ships.) moving to serve off Ushant, with Kent as his flagship. Tasked with intercepting the squadrons of du Casse and Duguay-Trouin off Cape Finisterre he failed to stop either, but was not deemed to be at fault. In August Hardy's squadron discovered and chased a French squadron of six merchant ships. The French formed line of battle assuming that Hardy was a force of privateers, but then attempted to escape once the warships were recognised. Hardy captured four of the ships while a fifth blew up when attacked. The sixth ship was not captured. (Note: The lead ship was the French 44-gun ship Griffin, at the time loaned out to merchant service. The others captured were the 12-gun Aventure, 16-gun Incomparable, and Rubis. The 36-gun St Espirit blew up in combat with the 60-gun ship of the line HMS Windsor.) At the time of the action there was an armistice in place to allow peace negotiations to begin, and the ships were later released to avoid legal entanglements relating to their status as prizes.

=== Dismissal and death ===
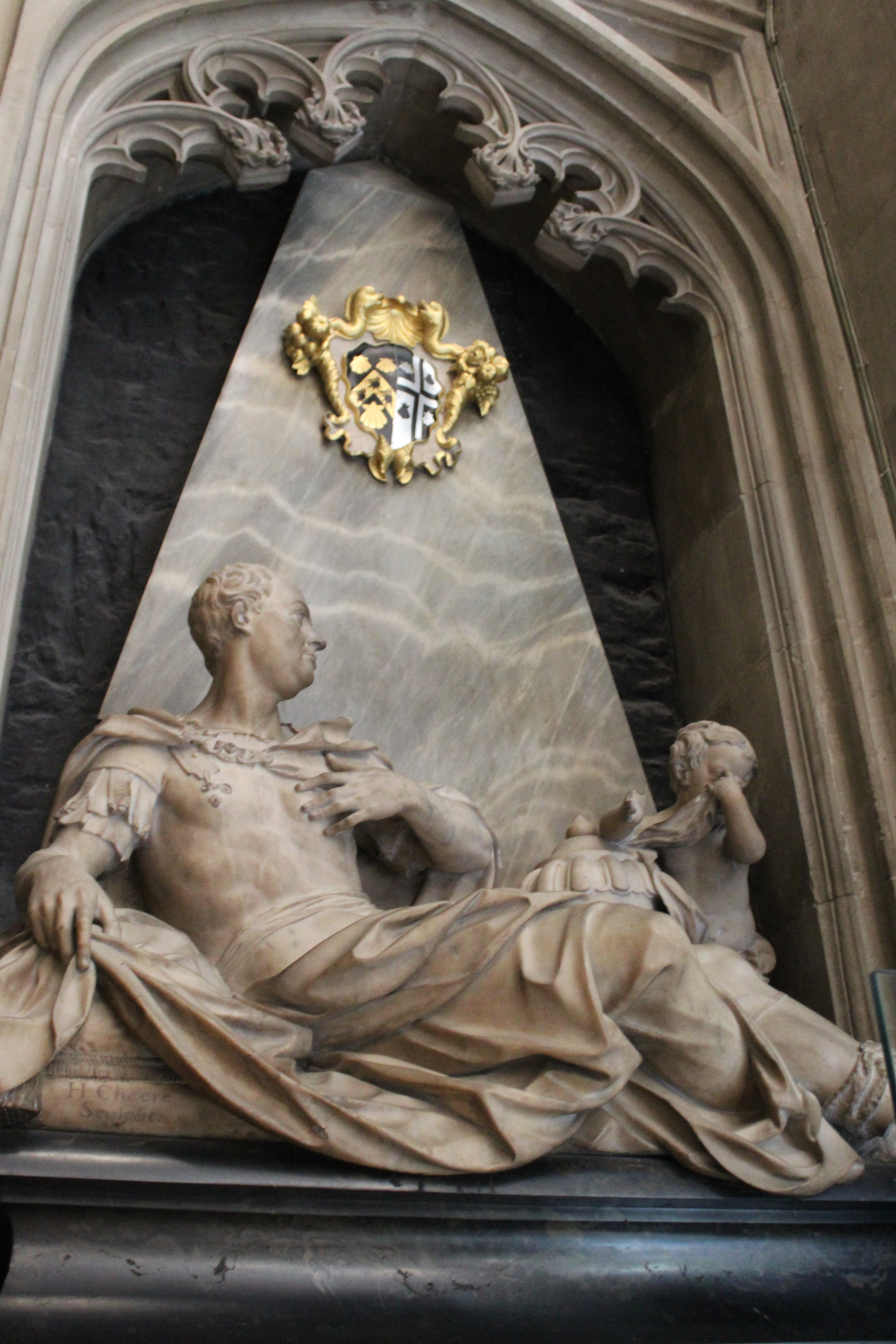
Monument to Hardy in Westminster Abbey

The Peace of Utrecht subsequently ended the War of the Spanish Succession and Hardy relinquished his command. He lost his Weymouth seat in the 1713 election, but had the decision reversed with another petition on 3 June 1714. On 11 June he was named a manager of the Longitude Act bill, providing a reward for discovering a method to accurately measure longitude. The bill was given royal assent on 9 July. This was Hardy's only significant parliamentary committee action, although he participated at the same time in the committee for the Stranded Ships Act, which created safeguards for such vessels.

In the first half of 1715 Hardy was appointed second-in-command to Admiral Sir John Norris in the Baltic Fleet sent to serve in the Great Northern War. Hardy's flagship for the operation was the 80-gun ship of the line HMS Norfolk. They sailed on 18 May, and arrived on 10 June where they joined with an allied Dutch fleet. Charnock comments that "the events of this expedition were totally uninteresting", the fleet doing little but escorting merchantmen safely into port. Hardy relinquished his position within the fleet later in the year. This was his last active service with the Royal Navy, as he was dismissed from the service in 1716 because his secondary political career was looked upon unfavourably in the wake of George I's succession.

Paula Watson in The History of Parliament suggests that Hardy's dismissal came about because of a suspicion that he was a Jacobite; after the Hanoverian succession much of the Tory party was believed to be supportive of the deposed House of Stuart, and the new administration removed many from positions of power. Hardy was also not returned for his seat in the 1715 election. He continued in naval circles after his dismissal, serving two terms as Master of Trinity House between 1729 and 1730. The naval historian John Knox Laughton suggests that Hardy was reinstated in the navy and promoted to vice-admiral of the red, but there is no official report of such a promotion occurring. Hardy died on 16 August 1732, age 65, and was buried with his late wife in Westminster Abbey. His monument, designed in 1737 by Sir Henry Cheere, shows him dressed in Roman armour lying on top of a sarcophagus and is a pair to the monument to John Conduitt opposite his.

== Personal life ==
Hardy married Constance Hook (died 28 April 1720) sometime before 1710. She was the daughter of Colonel Henry Hook, Lieutenant-Governor of Plymouth. Together the couple had three children; two daughters and one son. Hardy's son, Thomas, and his younger daughter, Charlotte, never married. His other daughter, Constance, married the politician George Chamberlayne. She inherited Hardy's estate in Middlesex upon his death.

== Notes and citations ==
=== Citations ===
Parliament of Great Britain
Preceded by Maurice Ashley; James Littleton; William Betts; Anthony Henley	Member of Parliament for Weymouth and Melcombe Regis; 1711–1713; With: Maurice Ashley (1711–13); William Harvey (1711–13); Anthony Henley (1711); Reginald Marriott (1711–13)	Succeeded by John Baker; James Littleton; Daniel Harvey; William Betts
Preceded by John Baker; James Littleton; Daniel Harvey; William Betts	Member of Parliament for Weymouth and Melcombe Regis; 1714–1715; With: James Littleton (1714–15); William Harvey (1714–15); Reginald Marriott (1714–15)	Succeeded by John Baker; Thomas Littleton; Daniel Harvey; William Betts
