= William Betts (MP) =

British merchant, financier and politician (died 1738)

William Betts (died 1738) of Epsom, Surrey was a British merchant, financier and Whig politician who sat in the House of Commons between 1710 and 1730.

Betts was raised by the family of George Dodington of Eastbury, Dorset, but his origins are unknown. He became a successful London merchant and financier and made a fortune through directorships and other means.

Betts was invited by local Whigs to stand for parliament at Weymouth and Melcombe Regis, but his journey went through some challenges. At the 1710 general election, he was returned as Member of Parliament after a contest, but his election was declared void on 17 March 1711 after allegations of bribery. This resulted in a by-election on 18 April 1711, in which he topped the poll, but was unseated on petition on 22 May 1711. In May, he was elected as a Director of the East India Company, and by this time held some £4,000 worth of Bank of England stock. At the 1713 general election, he was elected MP for Weymouth for the third time, but after voting against the expulsion of Richard Steele on 18 March 1714, was unseated on petition on 3 June 1714.

Betts was returned for Weymouth at the 1715 general election and this time kept the seat for a whole parliament, sitting on the Dodington interest. He voted against the Administration on the septennial bill but with them on the repeal of the Occasional Conformity and Schism Acts, and he voted against the Peerage Bill. He was returned unopposed at the 1722 general election.

In 1727, Betts was again returned after a contest. He did not vote on the civil list arrears in 1729. In 1730, the House considered a petition from Knox Ward claiming that Betts's election should be declared void on technical grounds. Betts was by this time infirm and unable to attend the House and declared the electors should be given an opportunity to make another choice. He did not stand at the by-election.

Betts died unmarried 14 March 1738, leaving £5,000 to George Bubb Dodington and £2,000 to Thomas Wyndham, both nephews of George Dodington, and £1,000 to John Tucker.

Parliament of Great Britain
Preceded by Maurice Ashley; Charles Churchill; Edward Clavell; Anthony Henley	Member of Parliament for Weymouth and Melcombe Regis; 1710; With: Maurice Ashley; James Littleton; Anthony Henley	Succeeded by Maurice Ashley; Sir Thomas Hardy; William Harvey; Anthony Henley
Preceded by Maurice Ashley; Sir Thomas Hardy; William Harvey; Reginald Marriott	Member of Parliament for Weymouth and Melcombe Regis; 1713; With: John Baker; James Littleton; Daniel Harvey	Succeeded by Sir Thomas Hardy; James Littleton; William Harvey; Reginald Marriott
Preceded by Sir Thomas Hardy; James Littleton; William Harvey; Reginald Marriott	Member of Parliament for Weymouth and Melcombe Regis; 1715– 1730; With: John Baker 1715–1717; Thomas Littleton 1715–1722; Daniel Harvey 1715–1722; Edward Harrison 1717–1722; Sir James Thornhill 1722-1730; Thomas Pearse 1722-1727; 1727-1730; John Ward 1722-1726; John Willes 1726-1727; Edward Tucker 1727-1730	Succeeded by Sir James Thornhill; Edward Tucker; Thomas Pearse; George Dodington
