= John Baker (Royal Navy officer) =

English admiral (1660–1716)

Vice-Admiral John Baker
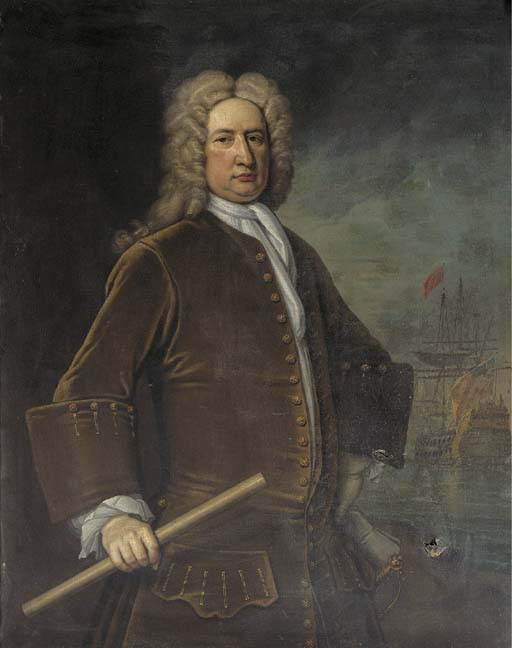
- Born: 1660
- Died: 10 November 1716 (aged 55–56)
- Burial place: Westminster Abbey
- Military career
- Allegiance: Great Britain
- Branch: Royal Navy
- Rank: Vice-Admiral of the Blue
- Commands: HMS Mary; HMS Boyne; HMS Newcastle; HMS Falmouth; HMS Medway; HMS Pembroke; HMS Monmouth; Mediterranean Fleet
- Conflicts: Nine Years' War; War of the Spanish Succession; Battle of Cádiz; Battle of Vigo Bay; Capture of Gibraltar; Battle of Málaga; Siege of Barcelona; Battle of Toulon

Vice-Admiral John Baker (1660 – 10 November 1716) was an officer of the Royal Navy and politician who sat in the House of Commons between 1713 and 1716. He rose to the rank of vice-admiral after service in the Nine Years' War and the War of the Spanish Succession.

== Biography ==
Baker was appointed a lieutenant by George Legge, 1st Baron Dartmouth on 14 November 1688; on 12 October 1691 he was advanced to be captain of HMS Mary, and during the Nine Years' War with France successively commanded HMS Boyne, HMS Newcastle, HMS Falmouth, and HMS Medway, for the greater part of the time in the Mediterranean, but without any opportunity of especial distinction. Early in 1701, during the War of the Spanish Succession he was appointed to HMS Pembroke, and a year later to the 66-gun HMS Monmouth, in which he continued for nearly six years, serving in the grand fleet under Sir George Rooke or Sir Cloudesley Shovell, at the Battles of Cadiz and Vigo Bay in 1702, at the Capture of Gibraltar and the Battle of Málaga in 1704, at the Siege of Barcelona in 1705, and the Battle of Toulon in 1707.

Baker returned to England with the squadron of which so many of the ships were lost in the Scilly naval disaster on 22 October 1707, resulting in the deaths of nearly 2,000 men and Admiral Sir Cloudesley Shovell, and, having arrived at the Nore, was ordered to refit and keep the men on board with a view to their being sent to other ships. Baker remonstrated; he thought their case was hard, and that they ought to be allowed to go home. 'Most of them,' he wrote, on 3 November, 'have been with me in this ship for almost six years, and many have followed me from ship to ship for several years before.' It does not appear that any good came of the application, which the Admiralty probably considered a bit of maudlin and absurd sentimentality.

On 26 January 1708 Baker was promoted to be rear-admiral of the white, and commanded in the second post under Sir George Byng on the coast of Scotland. He afterwards conducted Maria Anna of Austria, the daughter of Leopold I, Holy Roman Emperor, who was betrothed to John V of Portugal, from Holland to Spithead, and with Sir George Byng escorted her to Lisbon. On 12 November 1709 he was advanced to be vice-admiral of the blue, and hoisted his flag in HMS Stirling Castle as second in command in the Mediterranean under Sir John Norris and afterwards Sir John Jennings.

Towards the end of 1711 Baker was detached by Jennings to Lisbon and the Azores, to protect the Portuguese, East India, and Brazil trade, especially from René Duguay-Trouin and Jacques Cassard. In the course of a cruise from Lisbon in February 1712 he drove a large Spanish ship ashore near Cape St. Mary's, but the weather was rough, and before he could approach, the wreck was gutted and destroyed by the Portuguese. Afterwards he captured a richly laden French ship for Martinique, and returned to Lisbon by the beginning of March. At the Azores he remained till the following September, and having intelligence that the Brazil fleet was near, he put to sea on the 11th, and escorted it to the Tagus.

Baker returned to England at the peace, and was elected MP for Weymouth and Melcombe Regis at the 1713 general election but was unseated on petition on 3 June 1714. He was re-elected at the 1715 general election but died the following year. He followed his patron Byng in parliamentary matters and therefore supported the whigs and the Admiralty administration of Edward Russell, 1st Earl of Orford.

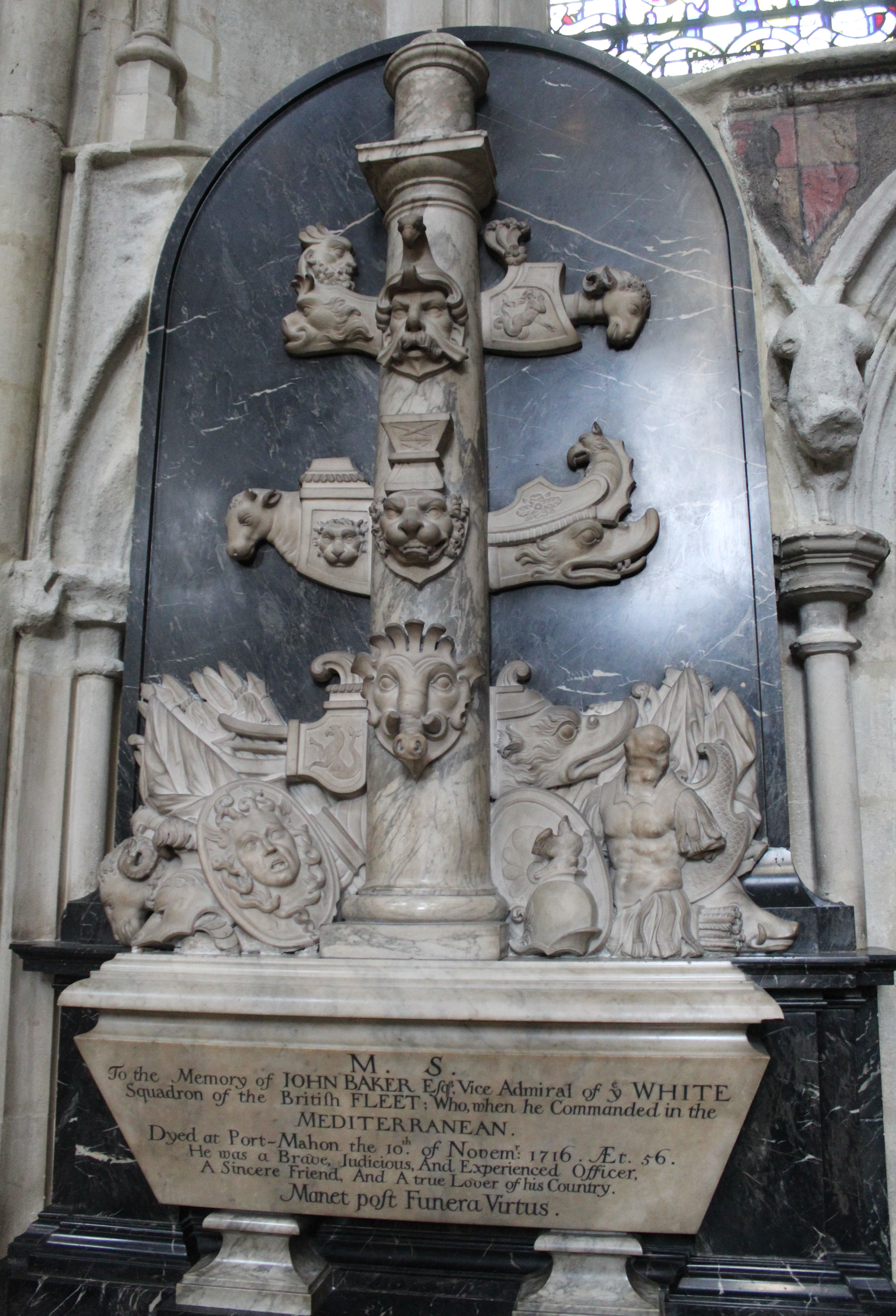
Baker's monument in Westminster Abbey

Soon after the accession of George I in August 1714, Baker was again sent out as commander-in-chief Mediterranean Fleet to negotiate with or restrain the corsairs of North Africa, He concluded a treaty with Tripoli and Tunis, and inflicted punishment on some of the Sallee cruisers. He had just been relieved by Rear-Admiral Charles Cornewall, when he died at Port Mahon on 10 November 1716.

Baker was buried in Westminster Abbey, where a monument to his memory by Francis Bird was erected, for, though his is not one of the great historic names of the navy, he was, in the words of his epitaph, 'a brave, judicious, and experienced officer, a sincere friend, and a true lover of his country.' His nephew, Hercules Baker, a captain in the navy, and who was serving in the Mediterranean at the time of the vice-admiral's death, became, in 1736, treasurer of Greenwich Hospital, and held that office till his death in 1744.

Parliament of Great Britain
| Preceded by Maurice Ashley; Sir Thomas Hardy; William Harvey; Reginald Marriott | Member of Parliament for Weymouth and Melcombe Regis; 1713–1714; With: James Littleton; Daniel Harvey; William Betts | Succeeded by Sir Thomas Hardy; James Littleton; William Harvey; Reginald Marriott |
| Preceded by Sir Thomas Hardy; James Littleton; William Harvey; Reginald Marriott | Member of Parliament for Weymouth and Melcombe Regis; 1715–1716; With: Thomas Littleton; Daniel Harvey; William Betts | Succeeded by Edward Harrison; Thomas Littleton; Daniel Harvey; William Betts |
