= James Littleton =

Royal Navy officer

Vice-Admiral James Littleton
- Born: 1668
- Died: 1723 (aged 54–55)
- Military career
- Allegiance: England; Great Britain
- Branch: Royal Navy
- Rank: Vice-admiral
- Commands: HMS Swift Prize; HMS Portland; HMS Anglesea; HMS Medway; HMS Cambridge; HMS Royal Sovereign; Jamaica Station
- Conflicts: War of the Spanish Succession

Vice-Admiral James Littleton (1668 – 1723) was a Royal Navy officer who served as Commander-in-Chief of the Jamaica Station.

== Naval career ==
Littleton was promoted to post captain on 27 February 1693 on appointment to the command of the sixth-rate HMS Swift Prize. He transferred to the command of the fourth-rate HMS Portland in January 1696, of the fourth-rate HMS Anglesea in 1698 and of the fourth-rate HMS Medway in 1702. He went on to receive the command the third-rate HMS Cambridge in 1705 and saw action at the relief of Barcelona and in command of a naval brigade at the capture of Alicante before taking command of the first-rate HMS Royal Sovereign in 1708.

Promoted to commodore, Littleton became Commander-in-Chief of the Jamaica Station with his broad pennant in the third-rate HMS Defiance, in 1710. He secured the capture of the San Joaquin in August 1711 during the War of the Spanish Succession.

He went on to be Commander-in-Chief at Chatham in 1714 and, having been promoted to rear admiral on 1 February 1717, second-in-command in the Baltic Sea that year. He was promoted to vice admiral on 14 Mar 1718.

Littleton served as a Whig Member of Parliament for Weymouth and Melcombe Regis from 1710 to March 1711, when he was unseated by petition, and from April 1711 to May 1711 when he was again unseated by petition. He was elected for that constituency, without being unseated, in 1713 and served until 1715. He later served as Member of Parliament for Queenborough from 1722 to 1723.

== Sources ==
- Cundall, Frank (1915). Historic Jamaica. West India Committee.

Military offices
Preceded by Charles Wager	Commander-in-Chief, Jamaica Station; 1710–1712	Succeeded by Sir Hovenden Walker
Parliament of Great Britain
Preceded by George St Lo; Charles Churchill; Edward Clavell; Anthony Henley	Member of Parliament for Weymouth and Melcombe Regis; 1710–1711; With: Maurice Ashley; William Betts; Anthony Henley	Succeeded by Maurice Ashley; Sir Thomas Hardy; William Harvey; Anthony Henley
Preceded by Maurice Ashley; Sir Thomas Hardy; William Harvey; Reginald Marriott	Member of Parliament for Weymouth and Melcombe Regis; 1713–1715; With: John Baker; Sir Thomas Hardy; Daniel Harvey; William Harvey; William Betts; Reginald Marriott	Succeeded by John Baker; Thomas Littleton; Daniel Harvey; William Betts
Preceded by Thomas King; Philip Jennings	Member of Parliament for Queenborough; 1722–1723; With: John Cope	Succeeded by Lord Forbes; John Cope
