= Daniel Harvey (British Army officer) =

General Daniel Harvey
- Born: c. 1664; Coombe Surrey, England
- Died: 6 September 1732 (aged 67–68); Mitcham London, England
- Burial place: St Peter and St Paul, Mitcham
- Military career
- Allegiance: (United Kingdom) Great Britain
- Branch: Cavalry
- Service years: ca. 1688–1712
- Rank: General
- Unit: Colonel 3rd Regiment of Horse 1699–1712
- Commands: Governor of Guernsey 1714–1732
- Conflicts: Nine Years' War; War of the Spanish Succession
- Awards: Member of Parliament; Clitheroe 1707–1708; Dunwich 1709–1710; Weymouth and Melcombe Regis 1713–1714, 1715–1722

General Daniel Harvey (c. 1664 – 6 September 1732) was a British soldier and politician who was Governor of Guernsey from 1714 to 1732.

== Life ==
Daniel Harvey was born in 1664 in Coombe, near Kingston the second of three brothers. (Note: The mortality rate of the period meant names were often repeated.) His father Sir Daniel was the son and grandson of wealthy London merchants who married Elizabeth Montagu, daughter of Edward Montagu, Earl of Sandwich in 1651. In 1668 he was appointed Ambassador to Constantinople where he died in August 1672.

Harvey was educated at Christ Church, Oxford and graduated in 1681; he joined the army in 1688, served as a Member of Parliament or MP for three different constituencies between 1708 and 1722 and was Governor of Guernsey from 1714 to 1732. He had numerous and well-connected cousins, many of whom were also MPs; in 1707 he married his cousin Anne Montagu, widow of Alexander Popham.

== Career ==
In this period, regiments were considered the personal property of their colonel, changed names when transferred and were disbanded as soon as possible. Commissions were assets that could be bought, sold or used as an investment; at senior levels in particular, ownership and command were separate functions and many colonels delegated their military duties to a subordinate. Even the idea of a professional military career was comparatively new in late 17th century England which made it possible for people like Harvey to simultaneously pursue a political and military career.

Harvey first appears as captain in a cavalry regiment raised by Lord Delamere in 1688 to support William III. Delamere quickly relinquished command to Theodore Russell, an experienced Irish Protestant soldier and the regiment was posted to Ireland during the 1689–1691 Williamite War.

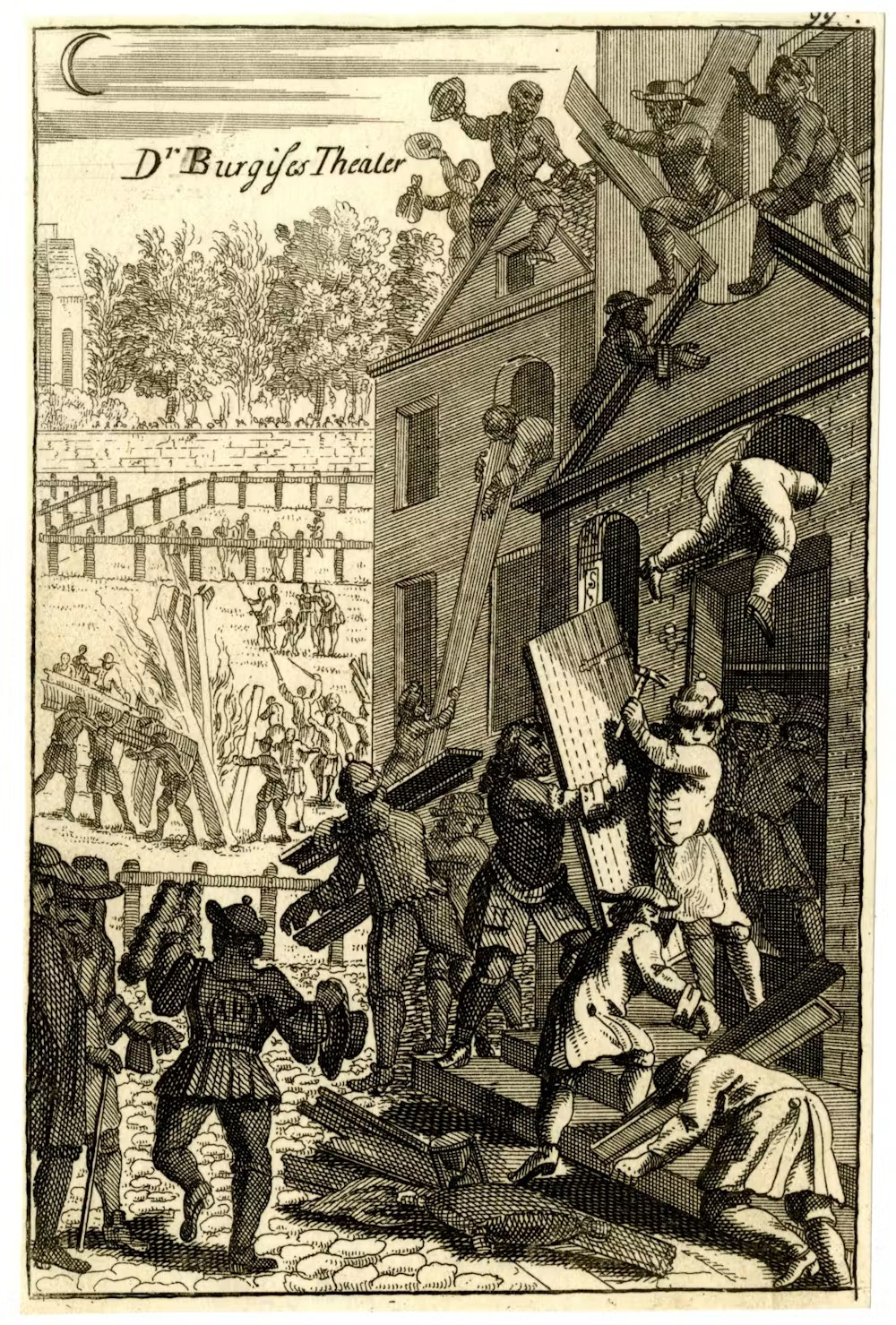
The Sacheverell riots of 1710 temporarily halted Harvey's political career

In 1694, Harvey became Colonel of a Regiment of Horse which served in Flanders until it was disbanded following the Treaty of Ryswick in 1697. He purchased the position of Colonel in the 3rd Regiment of Horse in 1699 on the death of the previous commander Richard Leveson and retained this until 1712.

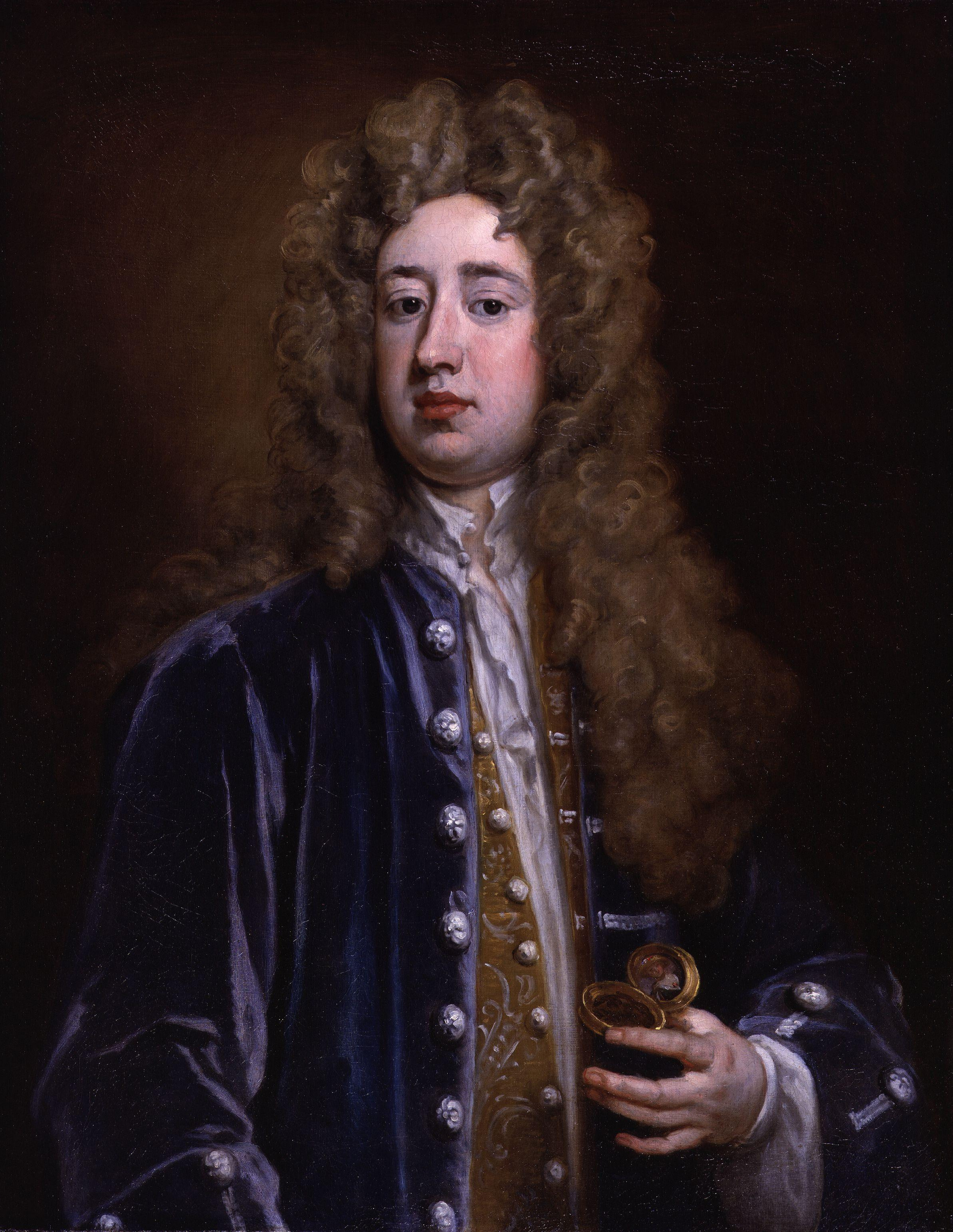
Harvey's friend Lord Mohun; killed in a duel in 1712.

During the War of the Spanish Succession, Harvey was promoted Major-General in May 1704 and his unit sent to Portugal to support Archduke Charles, Austrian candidate for King of Spain. However, he does not appear to have spent much time there; he returned to England before campaigning began in 1705 and in 1706 Lord Godolphin wrote of his ‘indignation’ at seeing Harvey and Lord Mohun in London 'while their regiments are serving abroad.' He was promoted to Lieutenant-General in 1707 and General in 1709.

Harvey now focused on his political career, generally siding with the Whigs. In January 1707 he was elected Member of Parliament or MP for Clitheroe, a seat controlled by his uncle the Duke of Montagu. Clitheroe returned two MPs, the other being his elder brother Edward, a Tory later implicated in the 1722 Jacobite Atterbury Plot. (Note: He was later released without charge but remained a Jacobite until his death in 1734.) Harvey strengthened his connection with the Montagus a few months later by marrying his recently widowed cousin Anne.

In 1710, he voted in favour of the impeachment of Dr Henry Sacheverell, a decision that led to the anti-Whig Sacheverell Riots which were followed by a Tory landslide in the 1710 election. Harvey lost his seat and resigned from the Army in 1712 when ordered to rejoin his regiment or be court-martialled. When George I came to the throne in 1714, the Whigs returned to power; Harvey was appointed Governor of Guernsey in 1714 and served as MP for Weymouth and Melcombe Regis from 1715 to 1722 but never achieved government office.

== Family ==
Daniel Harvey and Anne Montagu (1674 – January 1742) had one daughter, in addition to Anne's daughter from her marriage to Alexander Popham;

- Ann Harvey; died young;
- Elizabeth Popham (22 May 1693 – 20 March 1761);

== Sources ==
- Eveline Cruickshanks, HARVEY, Daniel (?1664-1732), of Mitcham, Surr. in The History of Parliament: the House of Commons 1715-1754 (1970)
- Paula Watson and Richard Harrison, HARVEY, Daniel (c.1664-1732), of Mitcham, Surr. in The History of Parliament: the House of Commons 1690-1715 (2002)
- John Burke, A General and Heraldic Dictionary of the Peerages of England, Ireland, and Scotland, extinct, dormant, and in abeyance ... England p. 116, Henry Colburn (1846)
- Joseph Haydn, The Book of Dignities: Containing Lists of the Official Personages of the British Empire ... from the Earliest Periods to the Present Time ... Together with the Sovereigns and Rulers of Europe, from the Foundation of Their Respective States; the Peerage of England and Great Britain p. 317, Longmans, Brown, Green, and Longmans (1851)

Parliament of England
Preceded by Edward Harvey; Thomas Stringer	Member of Parliament for Clitheroe; 1707; With: Edward Harvey	Succeeded by Parliament of Great Britain
Parliament of Great Britain
Preceded by Parliament of England	Member of Parliament for Clitheroe; 1707–1708; With: Edward Harvey	Succeeded by Edward Harvey; Christopher Parker
Preceded by Sir Charles Blois; Robert Kemp	Member of Parliament for Dunwich; 1709–1710; With: Sir Richard Allin	Succeeded by Sir George Downing; Richard Richardson
Preceded by Maurice Ashley; Sir Thomas Hardy; William Harvey; Reginald Marriott	Member of Parliament for Weymouth and Melcombe Regis; 1713–1714; With: John Baker; James Littleton; William Betts	Succeeded by James Littleton; Sir Thomas Hardy; William Harvey; Reginald Marriott
Preceded by James Littleton; Sir Thomas Hardy; William Harvey; Reginald Marriott	Member of Parliament for Weymouth and Melcombe Regis; 1715–1722; With: John Baker 1715–1717; Thomas Littleton 1715–1722; William Betts 1715–1722; Edward Harrison 1717–1722	Succeeded by William Betts; Sir James Thornhill; Thomas Pearse; John Ward
Military offices
Preceded by Richard Leveson	Colonel of the 2nd Dragoon Guards (Queen's Bays); 1699–1712	Succeeded by John Bland
Preceded by Giles Spencer	Lieutenant Governor of Guernsey; 1714–1732	Succeeded by George Cholmondeley, 2nd Earl of Cholmondeley
