= James Thornhill =

British painter (1675–1734)

Sir James Thornhill
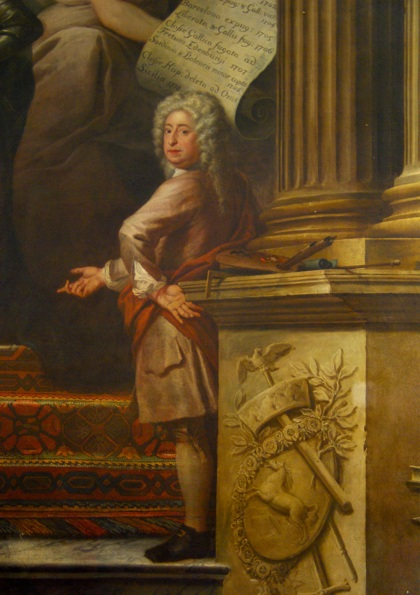
- Self portrait, detail of a painting in the Painted Hall of the Greenwich Hospital, Greenwich, London
- Born: 25 July 1675; Melcombe Regis, Weymouth, Kingdom of England
- Died: 4 May 1734 (aged 58)
- Occupation: Architect
- Children: Jane
- Parent(s): Walter Thornhill; Mary Sydenham
- Buildings: Moor Park

Sir James Thornhill (25 July 1675 or 1676 – 4 May 1734) was an English painter of historical subjects working in the Italian baroque tradition. He was responsible for some large-scale schemes of murals, including the "Painted Hall" at the Royal Hospital, Greenwich, the paintings on the inside of the dome of St Paul's Cathedral, and works at Hampton Court Palace, Chatsworth House and Wimpole Hall.

== Life ==
Thornhill was born in Melcombe Regis, Dorset, the son of Walter Thornhill of Wareham and Mary, eldest daughter of Colonel William Sydenham, governor of Weymouth. In 1689 he was apprenticed to Thomas Highmore (1660–1720), a specialist in non-figurative decorative painting. He also learned a great deal from Antonio Verrio and Louis Laguerre, two prominent foreign decorative painters then working in England. He completed his apprenticeship in 1696 and, on 1 March 1704, became a Freeman of the Worshipful Company of Painter-Stainers of London.

== Decorative schemes ==
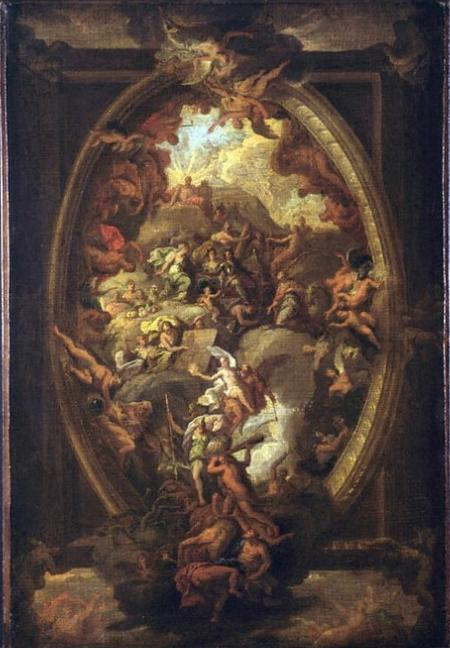
Sketch for the ceiling of the Painted Hall, Greenwich Hospital: William and Mary Presenting the Cap of Liberty to Europe, about 1710, V&A Museum no. 812–1877

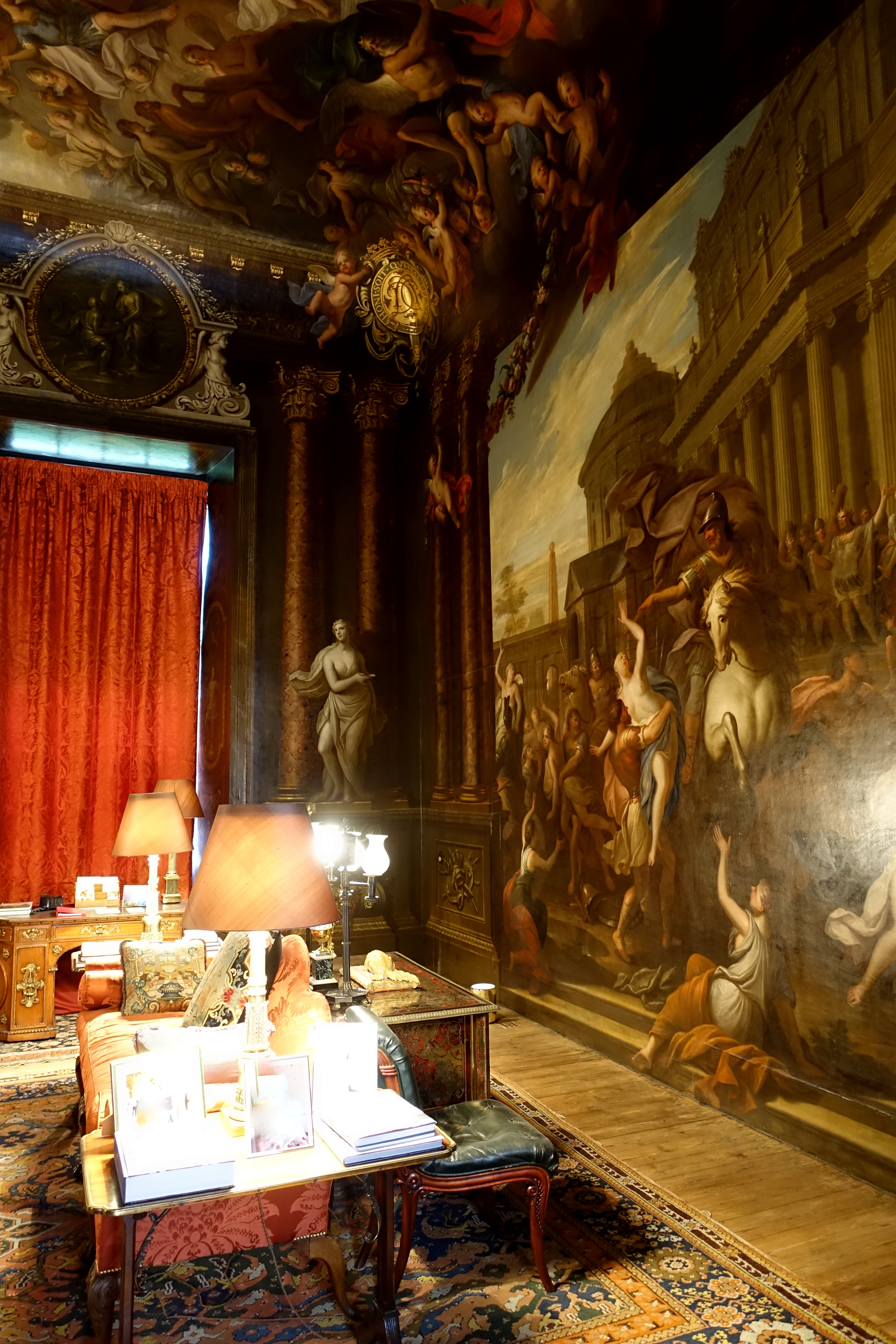
The Sabine bedroom at Chatsworth House in Derbyshire, 1706

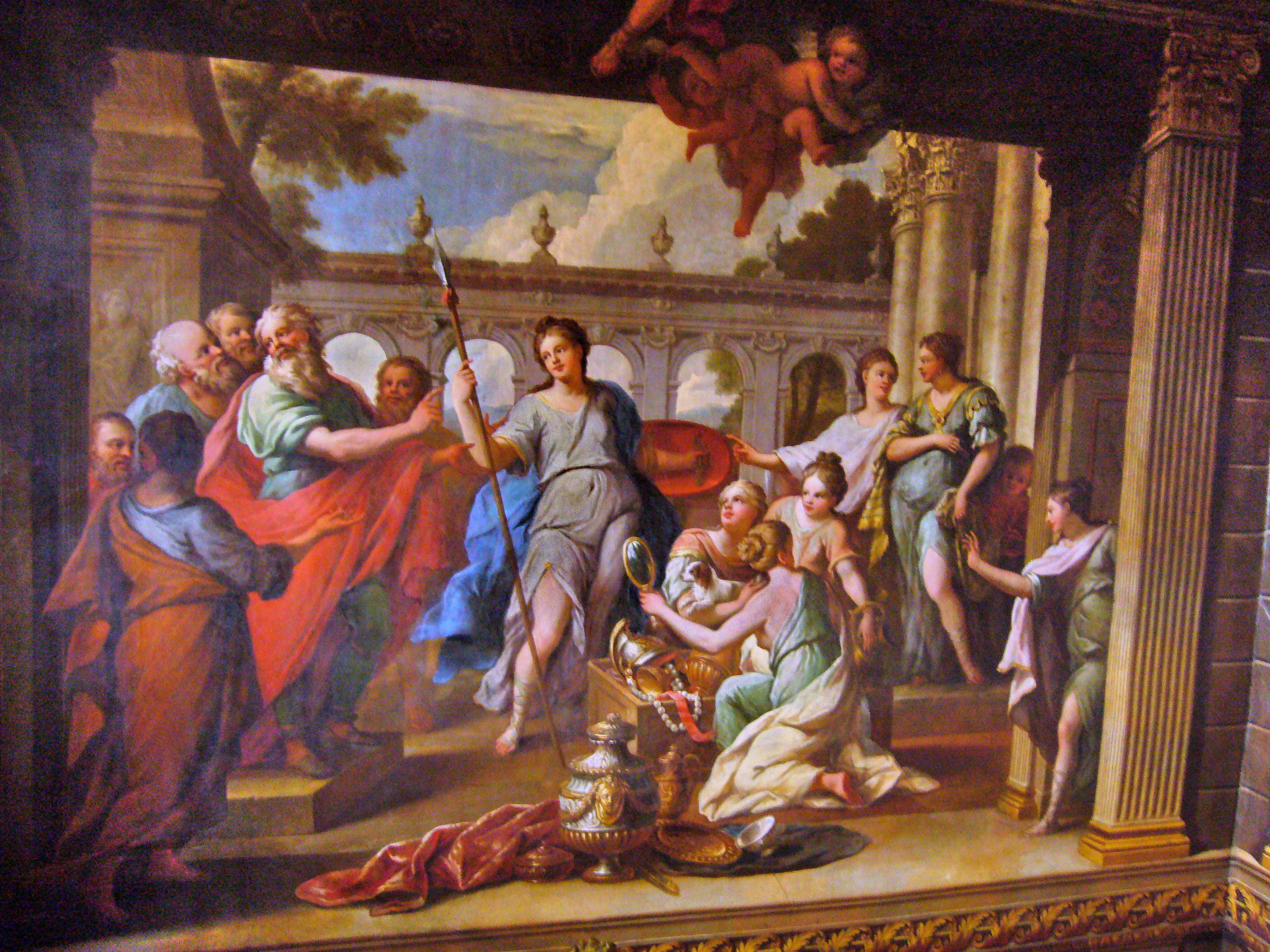
The staircase at Hanbury Hall in Worcestershire, murals completed c.1710

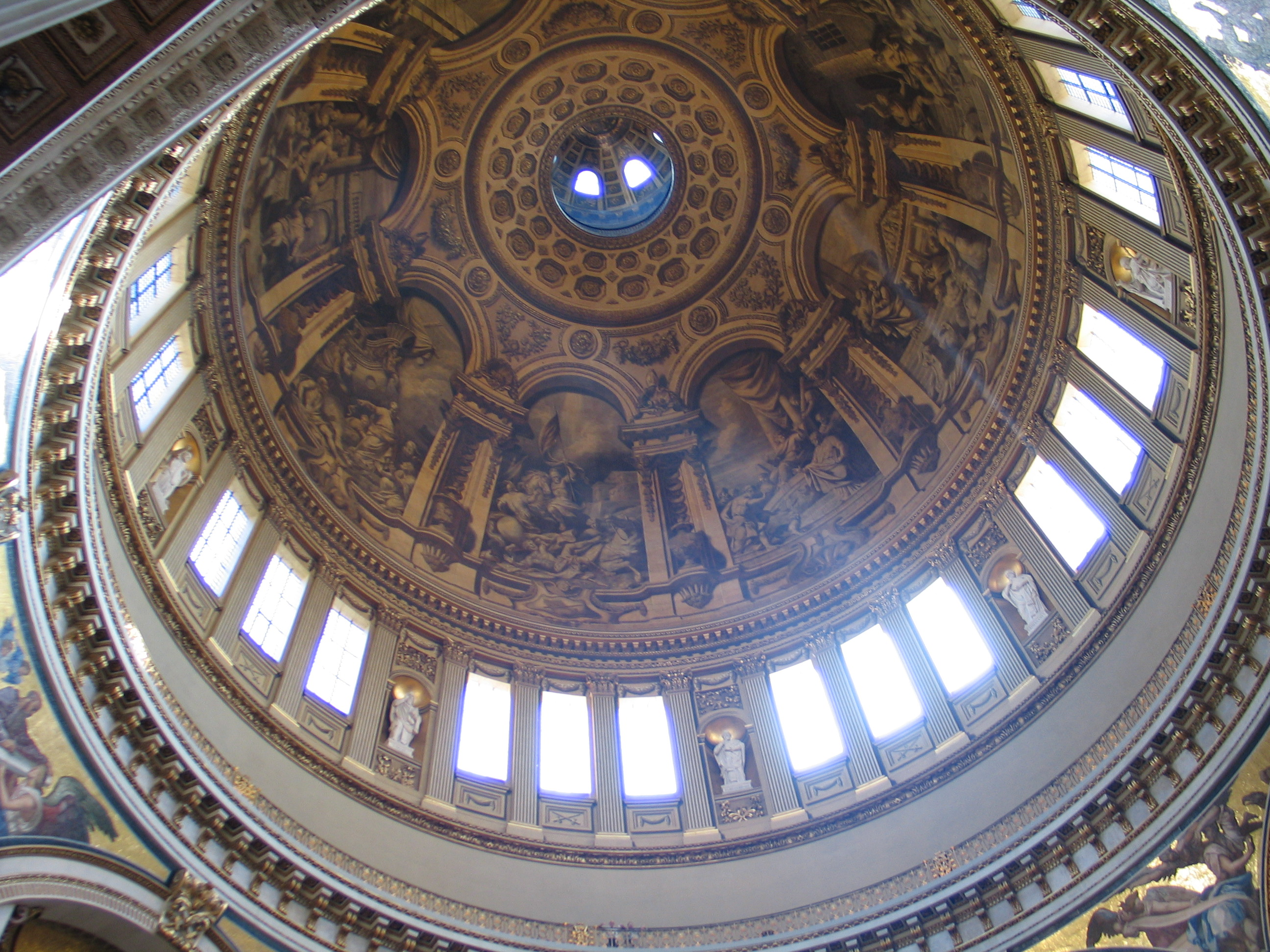
Interior of the dome of St Paul's Cathedral, London, 1714–17

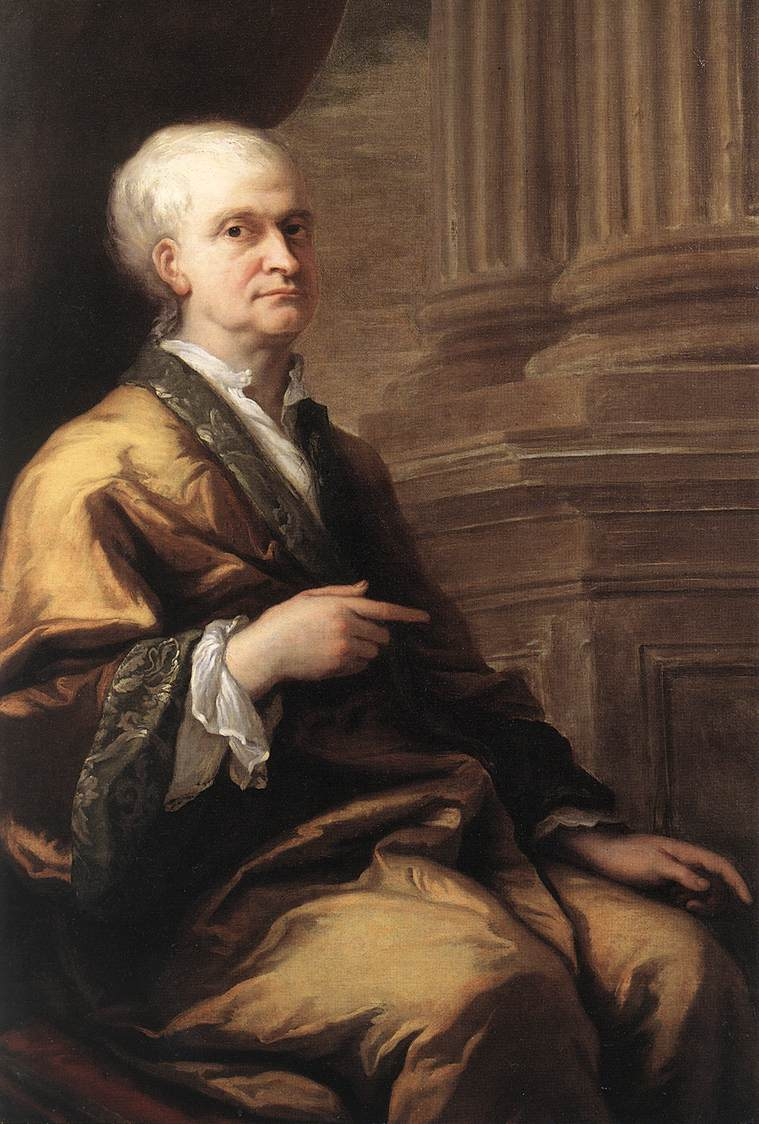
Portrait of Sir Isaac Newton in old age by James Thornhill, 1709–1712.

Thornhill decorated palace interiors with large-scale compositions, with figures commonly shown in idealized and rhetorical postures. In 1707, he was given the commission to decorate the Hall now known as the Painted Hall at the Old Royal Naval College (1707–1727). The scheme of allegorical wall and ceiling decorations of the hall depicts the Protestant succession of English monarchs from William III and Mary II to George I.

On 28 June 1715, Thornhill was awarded the commission to decorate the dome of St Paul's Cathedral by "a whig, low-church dominated committee inspired by a moral Anglican nationalism". The Archbishop of Canterbury, Thomas Tenison, is said to have remarked: "I am no judge of painting, but on two articles I think I may insist: first that the painter employed be a Protestant; and secondly that he be an Englishman". The Weekly Packet said that the decision to award Thornhill the commission would "put to silence all the loud applauses hitherto given to foreign artists". The eight scenes in the dome (1716–19), executed in grisaille, show episodes from the Life of St. Paul.

Thornhill's vast murals in great houses often related to topical events, as seen through the eyes of his mainly Whig patrons. At Chatsworth, during 1707-8, Thornhill painted a number of walls and ceilings, the most notable being the continuous wall and ceiling painting of the Sabine room, then a lobby, but since used as a bedroom. Here he painted The Rape of the Sabine Women, a vast panorama of mounted warriors carrying off the Sabine women to Rome. He chooses to feature strongly Hersilia, who was deified for her loyalty to her Roman husband, Romulus, as against her Sabine family - a deliberate reference to Mary II, lauded by the Whigs for supporting her Protestant husband, William, against her Catholic father, James.

At Hanbury Hall, beneath an imposing view of both the Olympian Gods and the story of Achilles which dominates the ceiling of the main staircase, Thornhill added a small portrait of Henry Sacheverell, a Tory propagandist put on trial for sedition by the Whig government in 1710, being cast to the Furies to be burnt. In 1716, Thornhill painted the ceiling of the Great Hall in Blenheim Palace for John Churchill, 1st Duke of Marlborough, newly returned to the country after being prosecuted by the Tory ministry in the last years of Queen Anne. The subject is, inevitably, the Duke's 1704 victory at the Battle of Blenheim, during the War of the Spanish Succession.

His last major commission was to paint the chapel at Wimpole Hall; he started work on the preliminary sketches in 1713 and the work was finished by 1724. The north wall has fictive architecture and four Trompe-l'œil "statues" of the four Doctors of the Church. The east wall above the altar is painted with the Adoration of the Magi.

In 1725 he offered to paint decorations for the ceiling of the New Council Chamber at the Guildhall in the City of London. He gave his services free, although he was rewarded with a valuable gold cup. The chamber was later demolished, though some of the paintings – an Allegory of London, and representations of the Cardinal Virtues, personified as naked children – survive.

== Other works ==
In his native Dorset Thornhill decorated the reredos at old St Mary's Church, Weymouth, with a picture of the Last Supper. Thornhill was also a notable portraitist.

== Drawing academies ==
In 1711, Thornhill was one of the twelve original directors of Sir Godfrey Kneller's academy at Great Queen Street, London. In 1716, he succeeded Kneller as governor there and held the post until 1720. He then established his own private drawing school at Covent Garden, but this soon closed. In November 1724, Thornhill made a second, more successful, attempt to establish a new free academy in his private house at Covent Garden. One artist that Thornhill is very likely to have influenced is the draughtsman and mathematical instrument designer Thomas Carwitham.

== William Hogarth ==
William Hogarth seems to have been a member of Thornhill's second academy from the beginning. On 23 March 1729 he married Thornhill's daughter Jane. Thornhill was with Hogarth when he went to see Sarah Malcolm in Newgate prison just days before her execution. This was in order that Hogarth might record her portrait.

== Honours ==
In June 1718 George I made Thornhill court painter, and in March 1720 Serjeant Painter, succeeding his former master Highmore in the latter role. On 2 May 1720, the King knighted him, the first native artist to be knighted. In the same year, he was master of the Painters' Company and in 1723 fellow of the Royal Society.

== Political career ==
Thornhill was returned unopposed as Member of Parliament for Melcombe Regis at the 1722 British general election. He was returned in a contest at the 1727 British general election. During his time, he voted regularly with the government. He presented to the church an altarpiece painted by himself.

== Houses and architecture ==
In 1718 Thornhill took a large house on Covent Garden Piazza, and in 1725 he renovated Thornhill House in the south of Stalbridge, near Sturminster Newton, Dorset, in the Palladian manner.

In 1720 he tried his hand at architecture. Along with Giacomo Leoni, he designed Moor Park, for which he also painted the entrance hall ceiling and other rooms.

Sherborne House, built c.1720 for Henry Seymour Portman as a halfway house between his properties in Somerset (Orchard Portman) and Dorset (Bryanston). John Hutchins in his 'History of Dorset' reported that the house was designed by 'Mr Bastard of Sherborne' (Benjamin Bastard), but given the date of its building, it was more likely that the Bastard company of Blandford Forum only provided the internal joinery. Michael Hill in the Dorset edition of The Buildings of England suggests that Sir James Thornhill may have been the architect. The House, which incorporates an earlier 16th century north wing, is three storeys high and seven bays wide and rendered in stone rubble and brick with a slate roof. The staircase features a mural painted a year or two after the completion of the house by Sir James Thornhill, which depicts the Greek mythological characters Meleager, Atalanta and the hunt for the Calydonian Boar. The architecture of the staircase allowed Thornhill three large areas on which to paint the story of the Calydonian Hunt: the ceiling, the North wall and the South wall.

The painting on the mural has been fully restored, alongside the joinery of the staircase so that the entire scheme is much closer to that completed by James Thornhill in the 1720s. A new bespoke lighting scheme ensures that the mural is displayed properly, with ‘candlelight’ temperature lighting.

Sherborne House is now a landmark new destination for the arts, named The Sherborne.

== Raphael cartoons ==
Towards the end of his life Thornhill was receiving no major commissions, so he began to copy the Raphael Cartoons, then at Hampton Court. Apart from full-size copies, completed in 1731, he made a set at half-scale, plus 162 smaller studies of heads, hands and feet intending to publish them in printed form for the use of art students, but left this work unfinished at his death. The original small wash designs of details of the cartoons are now in the collection of the Victoria and Albert Museum, London.

Thornhill's copies of the cartoons were sold by auction by Christopher Cock on 24 and 25 February 1735 at his room in the Great Piazza, Covent Garden. The full-sized copies of the cartoons were bought by John Russell, 4th Duke of Bedford for £200, a very small sum which was less than the cost of the canvas and other materials used in making them. In 1800 Francis Russell, 5th Duke of Bedford presented them to the Royal Academy of Arts in London, where they remain.

== Gallery of Thornhill's work ==
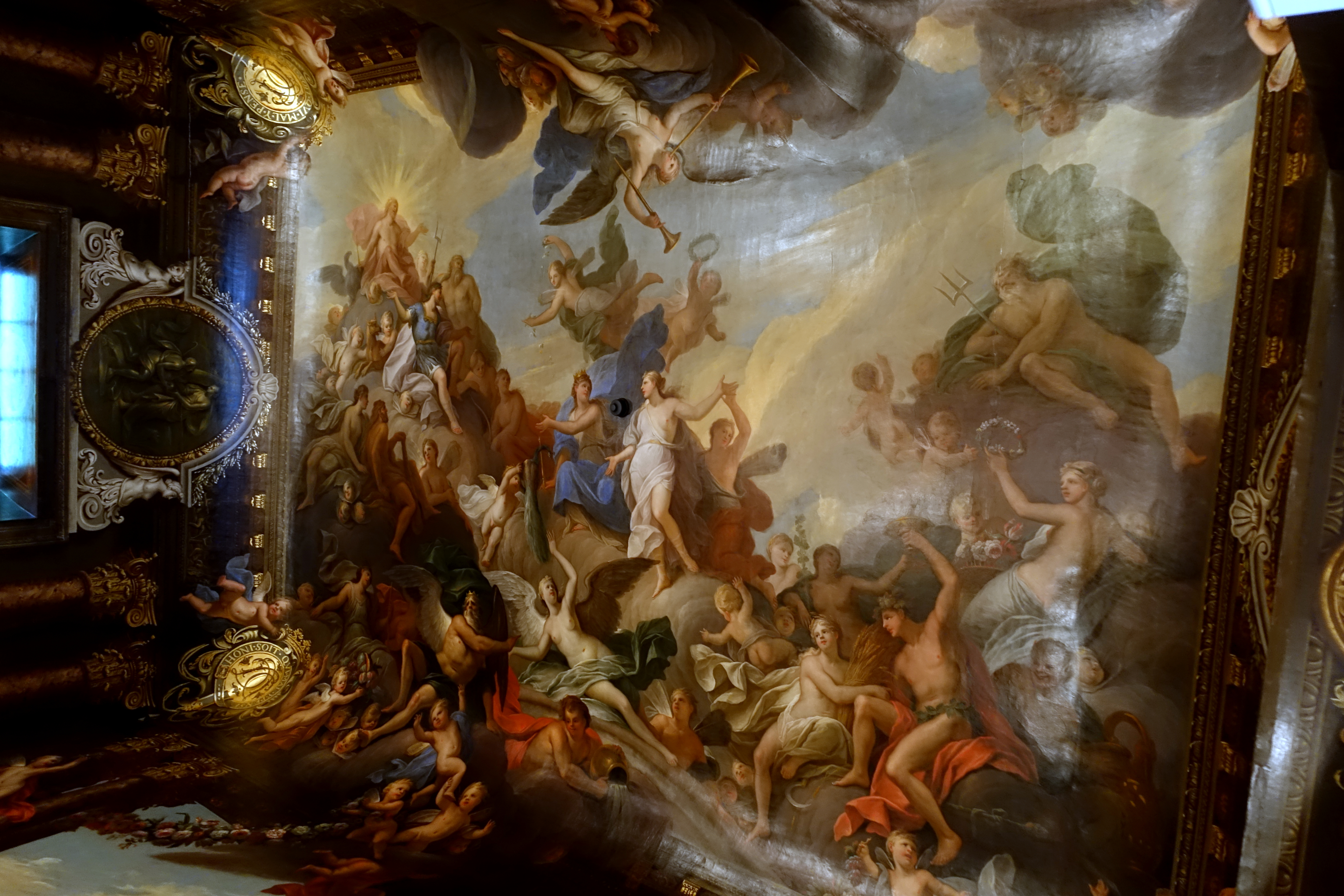
Hersilia Presented to Romulus in Olympus, Sabine Room, Chatsworth House, 1708

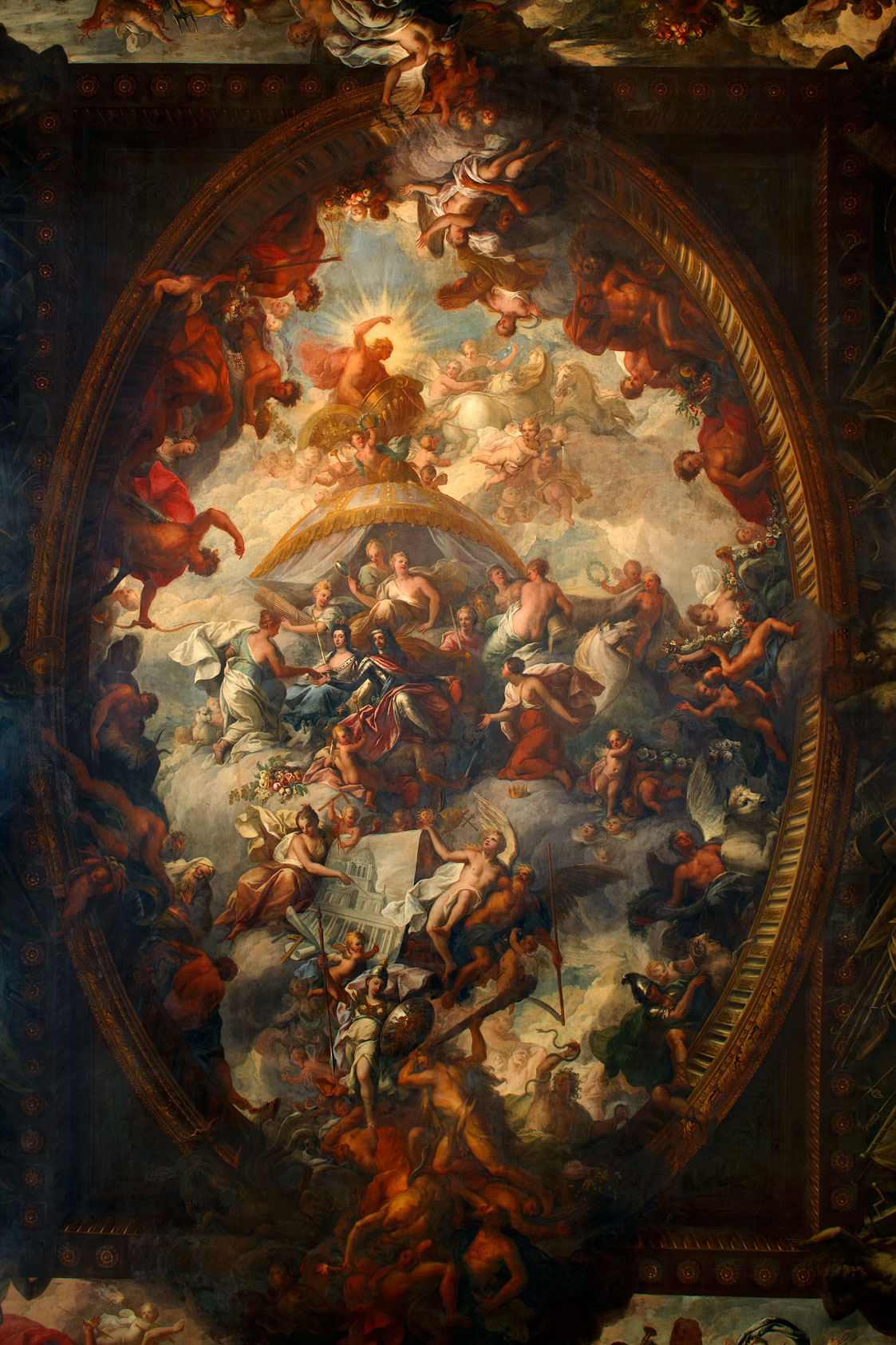
Triumph of Peace and Liberty over Tyranny, Painted Hall, Greenwich Hospital, 1708–1712

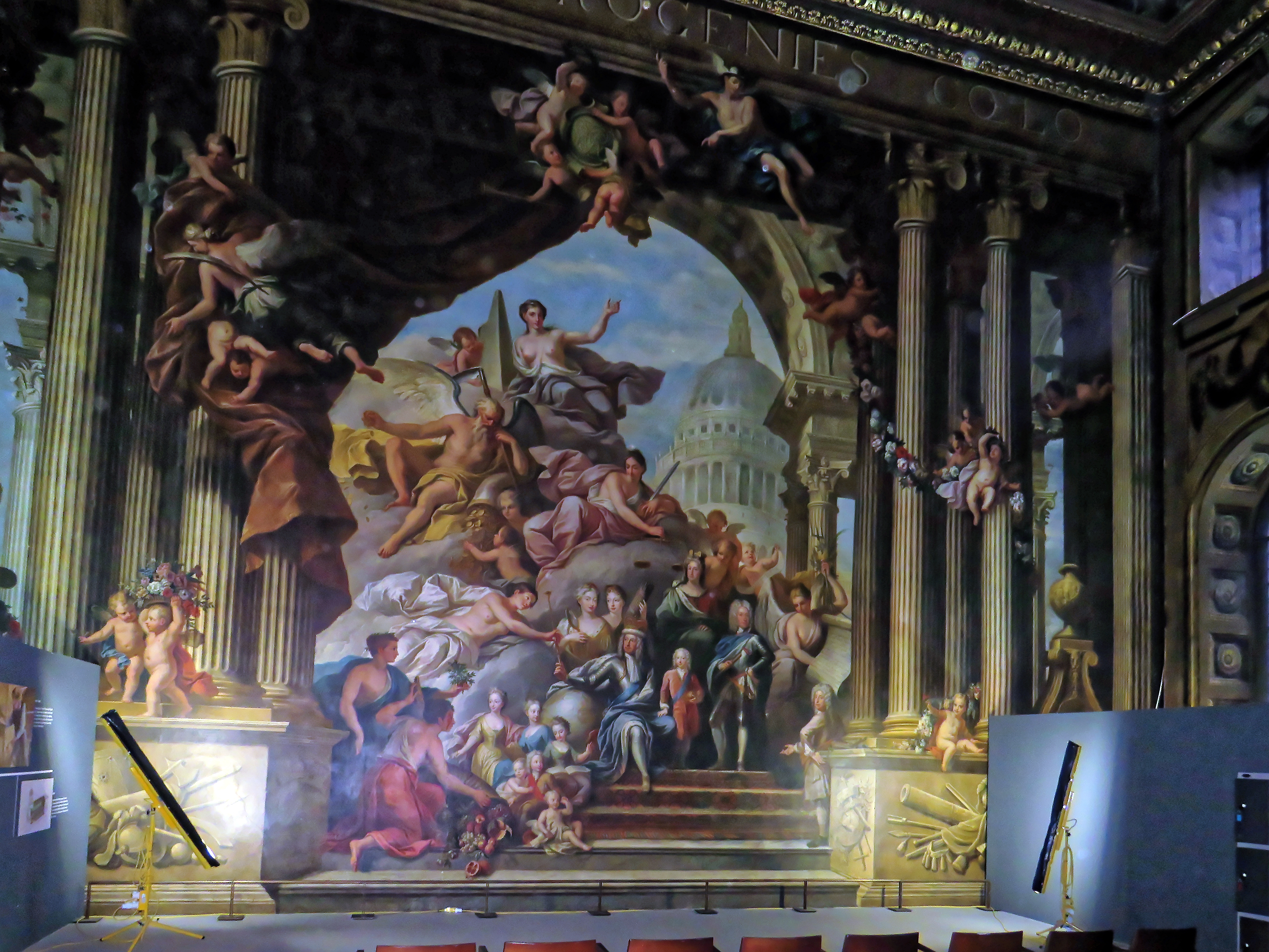
King George I and his family surrounded by allegorical figures, Painted Hall, Greenwich Hospital, 1718–1725

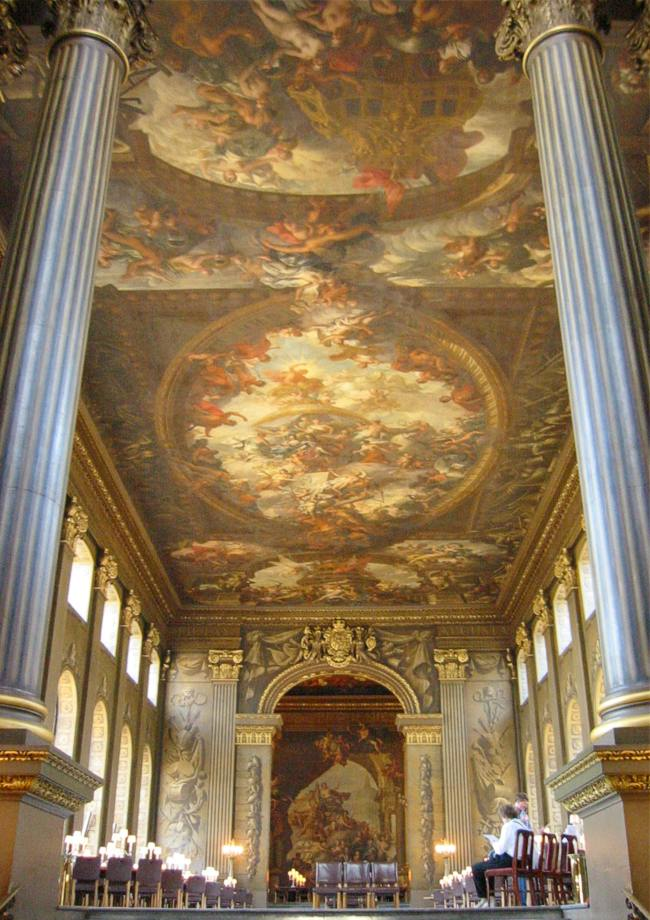
Painted Hall, Greenwich Hospital, 1708–1727

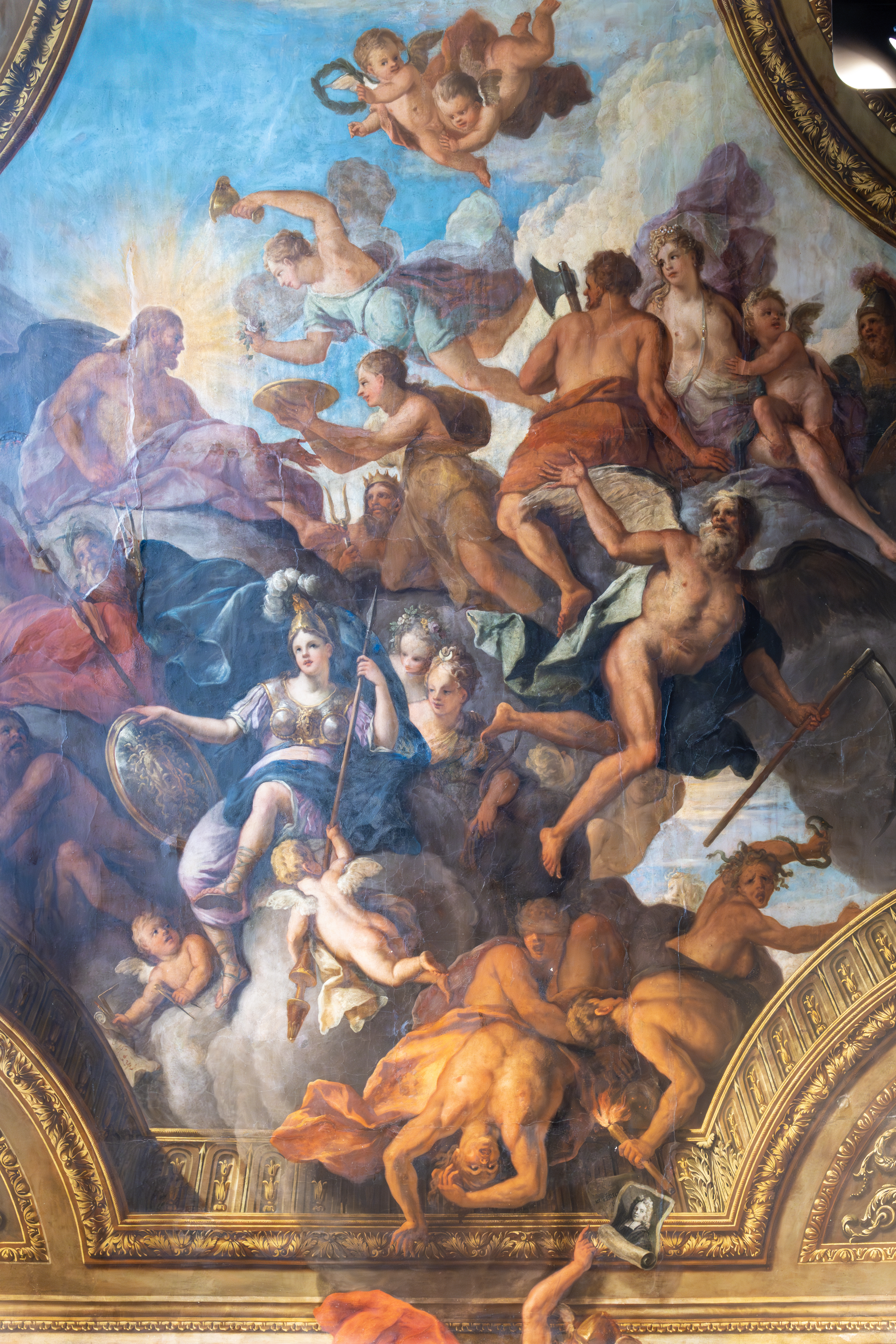
Ceiling of staircase at Hanbury Hall, c.1710

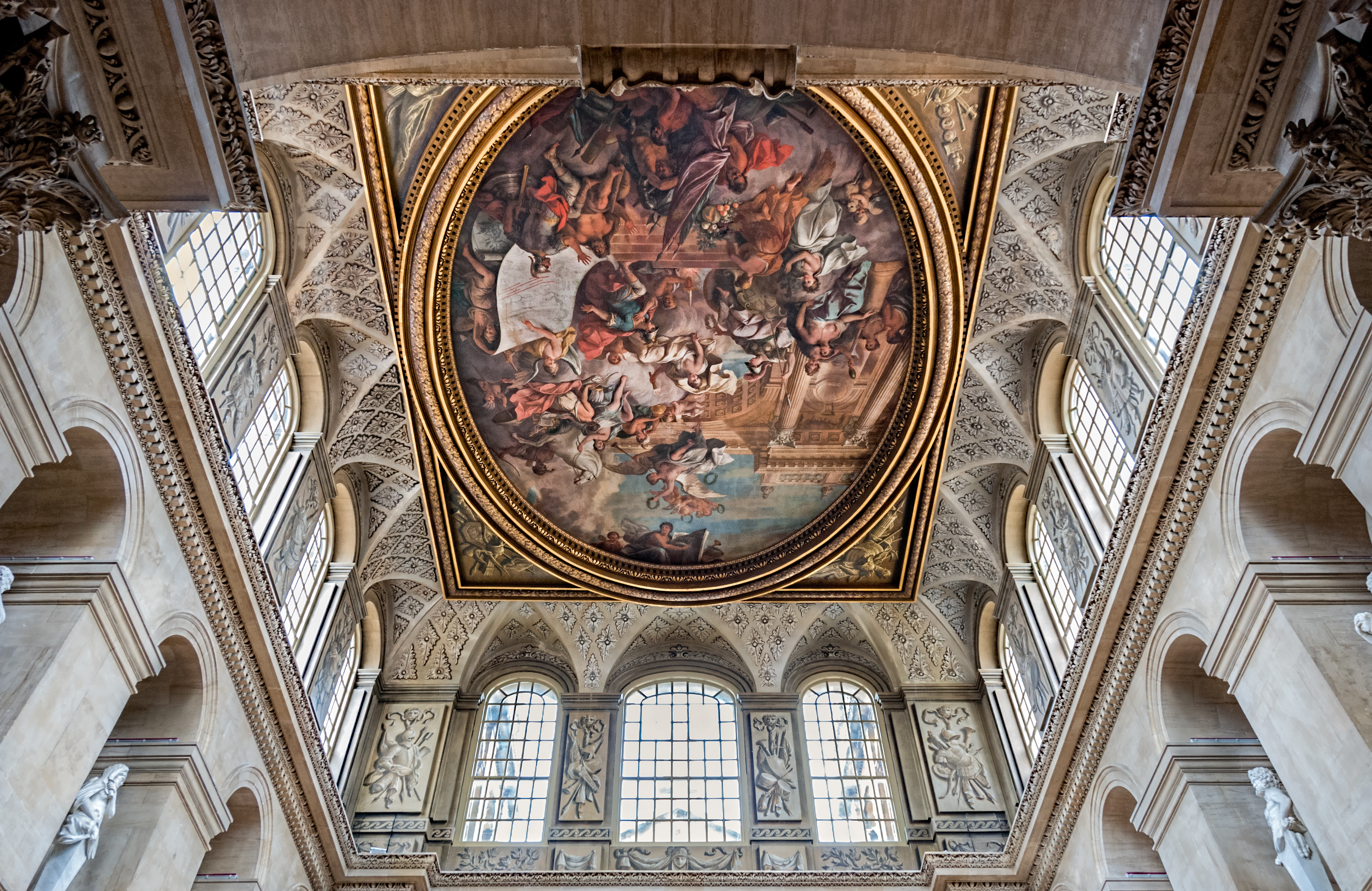
Hall ceiling, Blenheim Palace, 1716

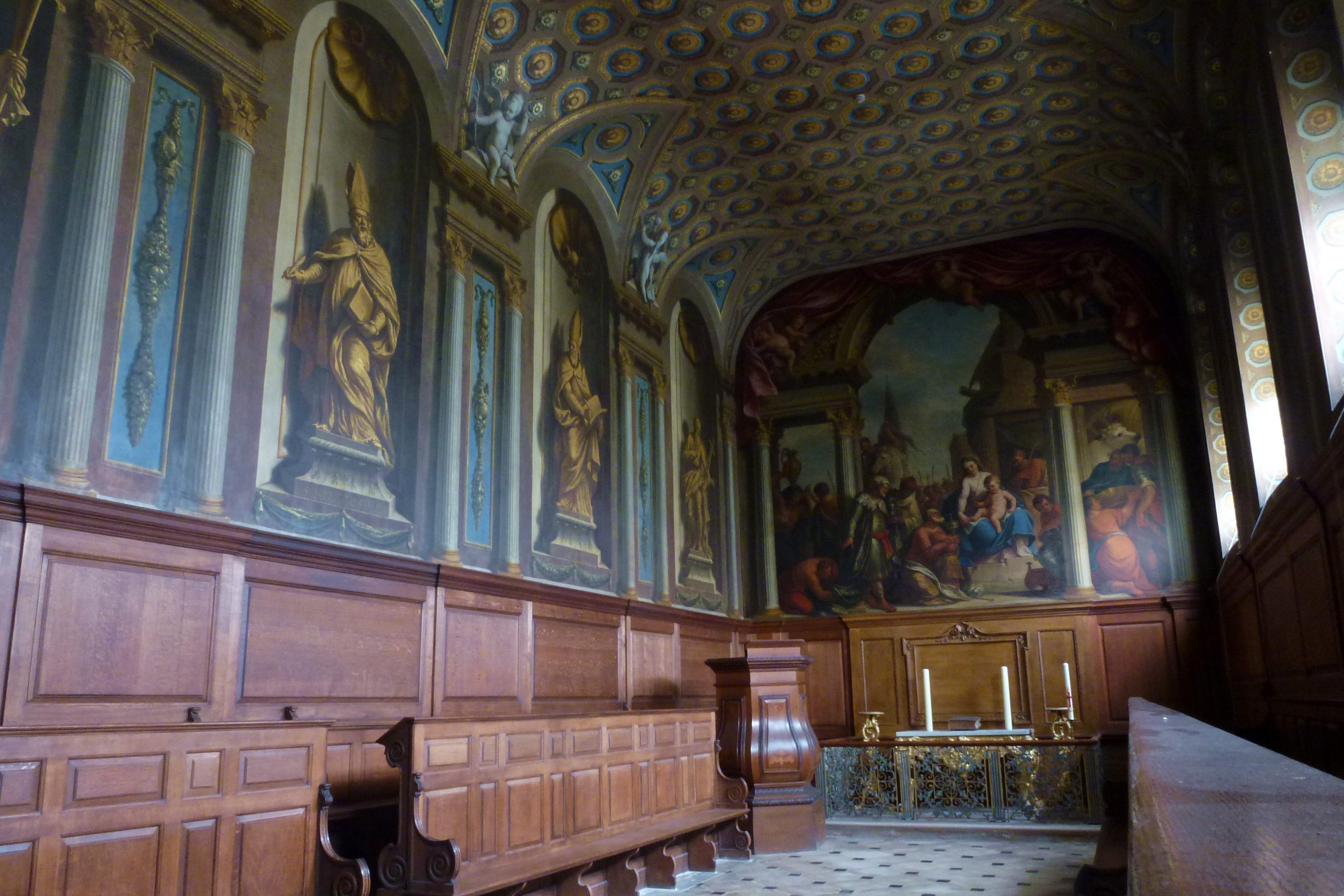
The chapel at Wimpole Hall, with Thornhill's murals, completed 1724

Parliament of Great Britain
Preceded by Daniel Harvey; William Betts; Thomas Littleton; Edward Harrison	Member of Parliament for Weymouth and Melcombe Regis; 1722–1734; With: William Betts 1722–1730; Thomas Pearse 1722–1727, 1727–1734; John Ward 1722–1726; John Willes 1726–1727; Edward Tucker 1727–1734; George Dodington 1730–1734	Succeeded by Edward Tucker; Thomas Pearse; George Dodington; George Dodington
