= HMS Deal Castle (1697) =

British warship

History

England
- Name: HMS Deal Castle
- Ordered: 24 December 1696
- Builder: Royal Dockyard, Deptford
- Launched: 6 November 1697
- Commissioned: 28 October 1697
- Captured: 3 July 1706
- Fate: By French privateer on 3 July 1706

General characteristics
- Type: 20-gun sixth rate
- Tons burthen: 240 3/9 bm
- Length: 91 ft 11 in (28.0 m) gundeck; 77 ft 8 in (23.7 m) keel for tonnage
- Beam: 24 ft 1.25 in (7.3 m) for tonnage
- Depth of hold: 10 ft 9.5 in (3.3 m)
- Armament: initially as ordered; 20 × sakers on wooden trucks (UD); 4 × 3-pdr on wooden trucks (QD); 1703 Establishment; 20 × 6-pdrs on wooden trucks (UD); 4 × 4-pdr on wooden trucks (QD)

HMS Deal Castle was a member of the standardised 20-gun sixth rates built at the end of the 17th century. After she was commissioned she was in Newfoundland, the West Indies, the Irish Sea, Jamaica, and back to Home Waters. She was captured by the French in 1706.

Deal Castle was the first ship so named in the Royal Navy.

== Construction ==
She was ordered in the Fourth Batch of four ships from Deptford Dockyard to be built under the guidance of their Master Shipwright, Fisher Harding. She was launched on 6 November 1697.

== Commissioned service ==
She was commissioned on 28 October 1697 under the command of Captain Henry Fowles, RN. In 1698 Captain Sir Thomas Hardy took command. Captain Fowles re-assumed command in 1699 and sailed for Newfoundland. In 1700, Captain Edmund Doyley, RN assumed command and sailed to North America and the West Indies in 1700 and 1701. In 1702 she was surveying the Irish Coast. Following Captain Doyley's death on 10 May 1703, Commander Henry Scott, RN assumed command for service in the North Sea. In 1704 Commander John Trehearne, RN took command and proceeded to Jamaica, where he died in 1705. In 1706 Commander Chaloner Ogle, RN took command.

== Loss ==
She was taken by a French 26-gun privateer off Ostend on 3 July 1706.
