= George Dodington (died 1757) =

not to be confused with his second cousin George Bubb Dodington, 1st Baron Melcombe

George Dodington (c. 1681–1757), of Horsington, Somerset, was an English politician who sat in the House of Commons between 1730 and 1754.

Dodington was the only surviving son of William Dodington of London and his wife Edith Rookes, daughter of Thomas Rookes, stationer of London. He succeeded his father in 1708. He married Alicia Gifford daughter of William Gifford of Horsington.

Dodington was returned as MP for Weymouth and Melcombe Regis by his second cousin once removed, Bubb Dodington at a by-election on 20 May 1730. He always voted in accordance with Bubb Dodington. He was returned unopposed at the 1734 British general election and did not stand at the 1741 British general election. In the interval while he was out of parliament he lost his first wife Edith, who died in June 1745, and married Mary Bennet in 1746. He was returned again as MP for Weymouth and Melcombe Regis at the 1747 British general election, but did not stand in 1754.

Dodington died without issue by either wife on 14 April 1757, aged 76.

== Sources ==
- Dodington Family of Horsington
- Timeline of the Dodington Family

Parliament of Great Britain
Preceded by Sir James Thornhill; Edward Tucker; Thomas Pearse; William Betts	Member of Parliament for Weymouth and Melcombe Regis; British general election 1730–1741; With: Sir James Thornhill 1730-1734; Edward Tucker 1730-1737; Thomas Pearse 1730-1741; George Bubb Dodington 1734-1735; John Tucker 1735-1741; John Olmius 1737-1741	Succeeded by John Tucker; Joseph Damer; John Raymond; James Steuart
Preceded by John Tucker; Joseph Damer; John Raymond; James Steuart	Member of Parliament for Weymouth and Melcombe Regis; 1747–1754; With: Welbore Ellis; Richard Plumer 1747-1751; Edward Hungate Beaghan; Lord George Cavendish 1751-1754	Succeeded by Welbore Ellis; Lord John Cavendish; George Dodington; John Tucker
