= Edward Tucker =

British merchant and politician

Edward Tucker (died 1739) of Weymouth, Dorset, was a British merchant and politician who sat in the House of Commons from 1727 to 1737.

Tucker was the son of Edward Tucker of Weymouth and his wife Joane. His father was a merchant adventurer of Weymouth, who was imprisoned as a Quaker in 1665. Tucker was also a merchant of Weymouth and was Mayor of Weymouth in 1702 and 1705. He succeeded his father in 1707, and held a government lease of some of the quarries at Portland. In 1714 he obtained the post of supervisor of the Portland quarries, which had considerable electoral influence at Weymouth and Melcombe Regis. Tucker joined forces with George Bubb Dodington, who took care of their interests at Westminster, while Tucker managed the borough. He was mayor again in 1716, 1721 and 1725.

Tucker was returned unopposed as Member of Parliament for Weymouth and Melcombe Regis at a by-election on 30 January 1727. His post as supervisor of the quarries was incompatible with a seat in the House of Commons, so he passed it on to one of his sons. He was elected in a contest at the 1727 general election. In Parliament he voted with the Government on the army in 1732 and on the repeal of the Septennial Act in 1734. It would appear that he was ill with rheumatism, palsy and dropsy but was returned unopposed at the 1734 general election. He was Mayor of Weymouth again in 1735. His son, John, was also returned for Weymouth and Melcombe Regis in 1735. They were among the five ‘friends’ of Dodington who all voted against an opposition motion for an increase in the allowance of the Prince of Wales on 22 February 1737 in response to a request to Dodington from Walpole. Later in 1737 he took up the post of supervisor of the Portland quarries again and vacated his seat in Parliament on 10 March 1737.

Tucker died on 5 April 1739. He was twice married and had two sons and three daughters.

Parliament of Great Britain
Preceded by Sir James Thornhill; Thomas Pearse; John Willes; William Betts	Member of Parliament for Weymouth and Melcombe Regis; 1727–1737; With: Sir James Thornhill 1727-1734; John Willes 1727; Thomas Pearse 1727-1737; William Betts 1727-1730; George Dodington 1730-1737; George Bubb Dodington 1734-1735; John Tucker 1735-1737	Succeeded by John Tucker; John Olmius; Thomas Pearse; George Dodington
