= John Willes (judge) =

English lawyer and politician

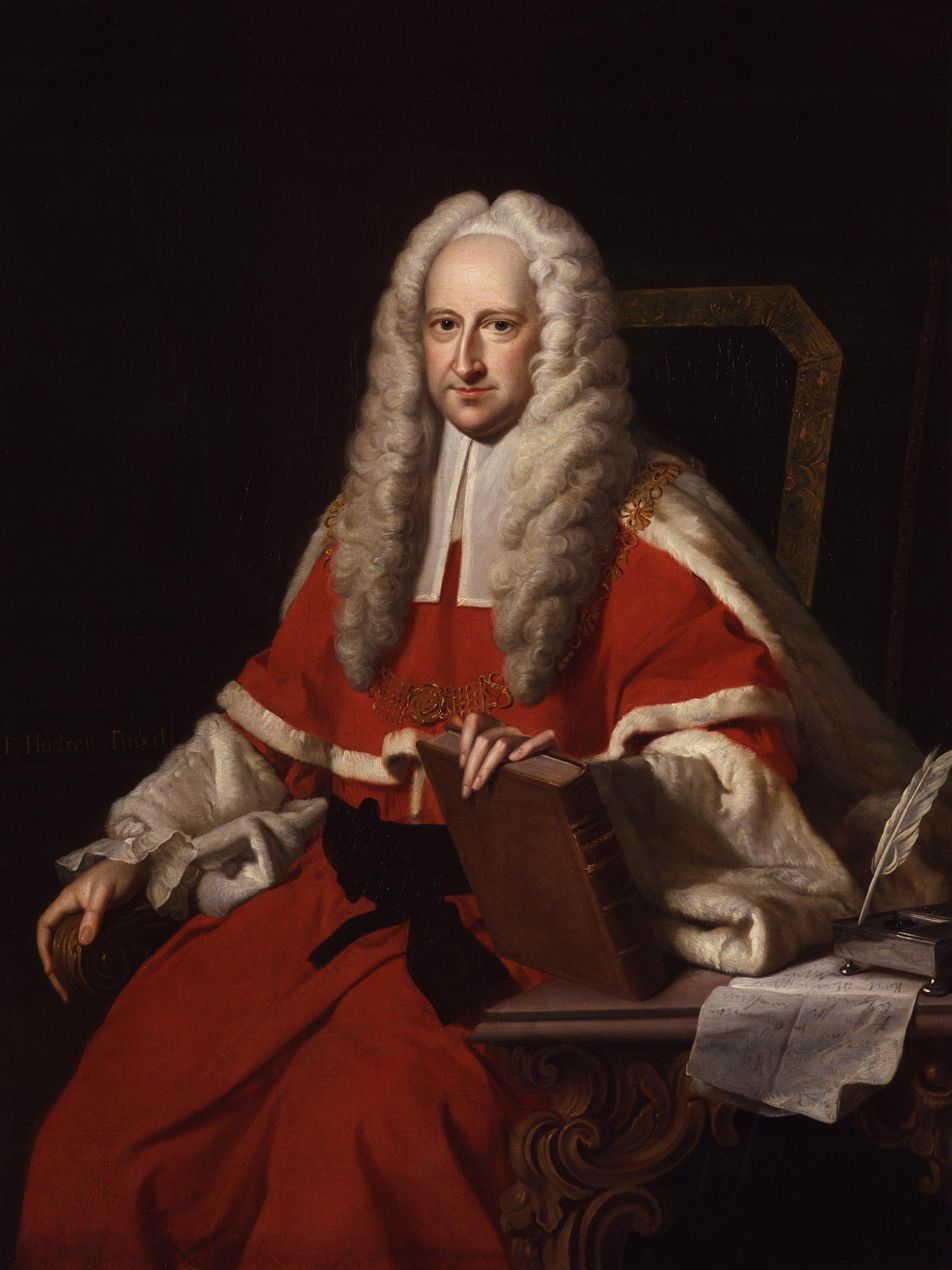
Sir John Willes by Thomas Hudson.

Sir John Willes PC KC (29 November 1685 – 15 December 1761) was an English lawyer and politician who sat in the House of Commons from 1724 to 1737. He was the longest-serving Chief Justice of the Court of Common Pleas since the 15th century, serving 24 years.

== Life ==
Willes was born at Bishop's Itchington in Warwickshire; his father, the Reverend John Willes, vicar of the parish, was a younger son of the long-established Willes family of Newbold Comyn. Dr. Edward Willes, Bishop of Bath and Wells, was his brother. Their mother was Anne (or Mary) Walker, daughter of Sir William Walker, who was three times Mayor of Oxford between 1674 and 1685.

Willes was educated at Lichfield Grammar School and matriculated at Trinity College, Oxford on 28 November 1700, aged 14. He was also elected a fellow of All Souls. While he was a student at Oxford he got into serious trouble for publishing pamphlets about the Government which were arguably seditious, and was threatened with prosecution as a result. His career was saved by the intervention of his fellow student John Carteret, 2nd Earl Granville, who pleaded for clemency. Granville often said in later years that he had made Willes a judge by saving him from the pillory. Willes joined Lincoln's Inn in 1708, and was called to the bar in 1713. In 1719 he became a King's Counsel, and in 1726 he was appointed a Puisne Justice of Chester on the Chester circuit, rising to Chief Justice of Chester in 1729.

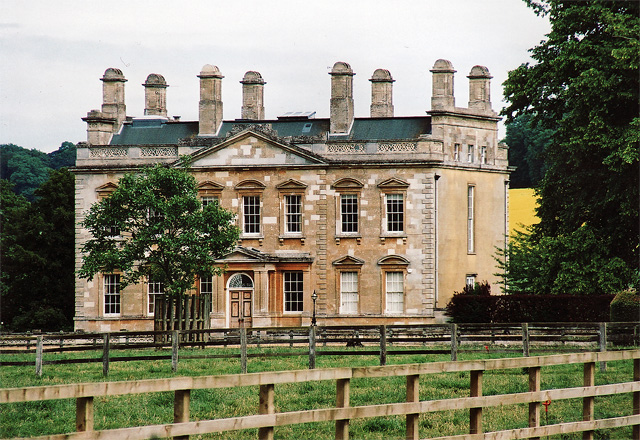
Astrop Park House

Willes entered Parliament as MP for Launceston in 1724, and subsequently also represented Weymouth and Melcombe Regis and West Looe. In 1734 he was appointed Attorney General, and was knighted in 1736. In 1735 he purchased the manor of Astrop, Kings Sutton, Northamptonshire where he built a new mansion Astrop House, (now a Grade II* listed building). In 1737 he was elevated to become Chief Justice of the Court of Common Pleas, the third most senior judge in the English legal system as it then existed, and held this post until his death in 1761; at the same time he was appointed to the Privy Council.

== Family ==
By his wife Margaret Brewster, Willes had four sons and four daughters. He is also reputed to have had numerous illegitimate children, none of whom he acknowledged or made any provision for. Of his legitimate children John (1721–1784) inherited Astrop Park and became a Member of Parliament and Edward (1723–1787) followed his father to the Bar and in due course became Solicitor General (1766–1768) and a judge of the Court of King's Bench. Sir John also encouraged his younger cousin Edward of Newbold Comyn to become a barrister: Edward went on to have a distinguished career, ending as Chief Baron of the Irish Exchequer. A grandson was Robert Merry.

== Character ==
Sir John was described by Horace Walpole as a man of open character, sharp intelligence and "strong passions which could not be concealed", He was notorious for gambling and womanising, and was said to have several illegitimate children. When objections were made to his promotion on the grounds of his debauched lifestyle, Sir Robert Walpole reportedly joked that he had always understood that such conduct was an essential qualification for high judicial office. On the other hand, it was generally agreed that his reputation prevented him from becoming Lord Chancellor, an office he undoubtedly wanted and was qualified for on grounds of legal ability.

He was notably severe towards all legal practitioners, especially attorneys, who appeared in his court, and this severity caused a notable falling off of business in the Common Pleas. John Montagu, 2nd Duke of Montagu commissioned William Hogarth to portray Willes unflatteringly in a number of cartoons series Before and After (Hogarth) in which lusty amoral rakes seduce women.

Parliament of Great Britain
Preceded by Alexander Pendarves; John Freind	Member of Parliament for Launceston; 1724–1726; With: Alexander Pendarves 1724–1725	Succeeded by Henry Vane; John Freind
Preceded by William Betts; Sir James Thornhill; Thomas Pearse; John Ward	Member of Parliament for Weymouth and Melcombe Regis; 1726–1727; With: William Betts; Thomas Pearse 1726–1727; Edward Tucker 1727	Succeeded by William Bett; Sir James Thornhill; Edward Tucker; Thomas Pearse
Preceded by Sir John Trelawny; Edward Trelawny	Member of Parliament for West Looe; 1727–1737; With: Edward Trelawny 1727–1733; Edward Trelawny 1734–1735; John Owen 1735–1737	Succeeded by John Owen; Sir John Strange
Political offices
Preceded by Sir Philip Yorke	Attorney-General; 1734–1737	Succeeded by Sir Dudley Ryder
Legal offices
Preceded by Sir Thomas Reeve	Chief Justice of the Common Pleas; 1737–1761	Succeeded by Sir Charles Pratt
