= Thomas Pearse =

British businessman and politician

Thomas Pearse (died 1743), of Tower Hill, London and Witchampton, Dorset, was a British businessman and politician who sat in the House of Commons between 1722 and 1741.

Pearse was the second son of James Pearse of Weymouth. He was in business in the City of London and, at some time, became Chief clerk at the Navy office He married twice, his second wife being a daughter of Thomas Best of Chatham. In 1721 he became a director of the South Sea Company.

Pearse was returned unopposed as Member of Parliament for his native town Weymouth and Melcombe Regis, at the 1722 general election. He was appointed a commissioner of the navy in 1726 and vacated his seat on 11 October 1726. He chose not to stand at the ensuing by-election, and was re-elected MP for Weymouth and Melcombe Regis in a contest at the 1727 general election. He was returned unopposed at the 1734 general election, voting with the Government in every recorded division.

When in 1740 George Bubb Dodington set up four opposition candidates at Weymouth, Walpole gave Pearse and John Olmius ‘the strongest assurance of my friendship and support’ against everybody that shall think fit to oppose them. During the campaign at the 1741 general election Walpole approved a scheme drawn up by Pearse's friends at Weymouth to remove several local revenue officers to allow the Government to win all four seats. Pearse was defeated in the contest at the election. Afterwards, he gave evidence to the secret committee set up by the House of Commons to enquire into Walpole's Administration. He admitted that the mayor of Weymouth had been offered the post of collector of customs for himself and a living for his brother-in-law, a clergyman if he would pack the corporation to choose a returning officer for the election. This was backed up by an implied threat to the town's charter when the mayor refused.

Pearse was still in possession of his Navy place when he died on 3 April 1743. He had a son and three daughters by his first wife, and two sons and a daughter by his second wife.

Parliament of Great Britain
Preceded by Edward Harrison; Thomas Littleton; Daniel Harvey; William Betts	Member of Parliament for Weymouth and Melcombe Regis; 1722–1726; With: Sir James Thornhill; John Ward 1722–1726; William Betts; John Willes 1726–1727	Succeeded by Sir James Thornhill; Edward Tucker; John Willes; William Betts
Preceded by Sir James Thornhill; Edward Tucker; John Willes; William Betts	Member of Parliament for Weymouth and Melcombe Regis; 1727–1741; With: Sir James Thornhill 1727-1734; Edward Tucker 1727-1737; William Betts 1737-2730; George Dodington 1730-1741; George Bubb Dodington 1734-1735; John Tucker; John Olmius	Succeeded by John Tucker; Joseph Damer; John Raymond; James Steuart
