= George Dodington, 1st Baron Melcombe =

British politician (1691–1762)

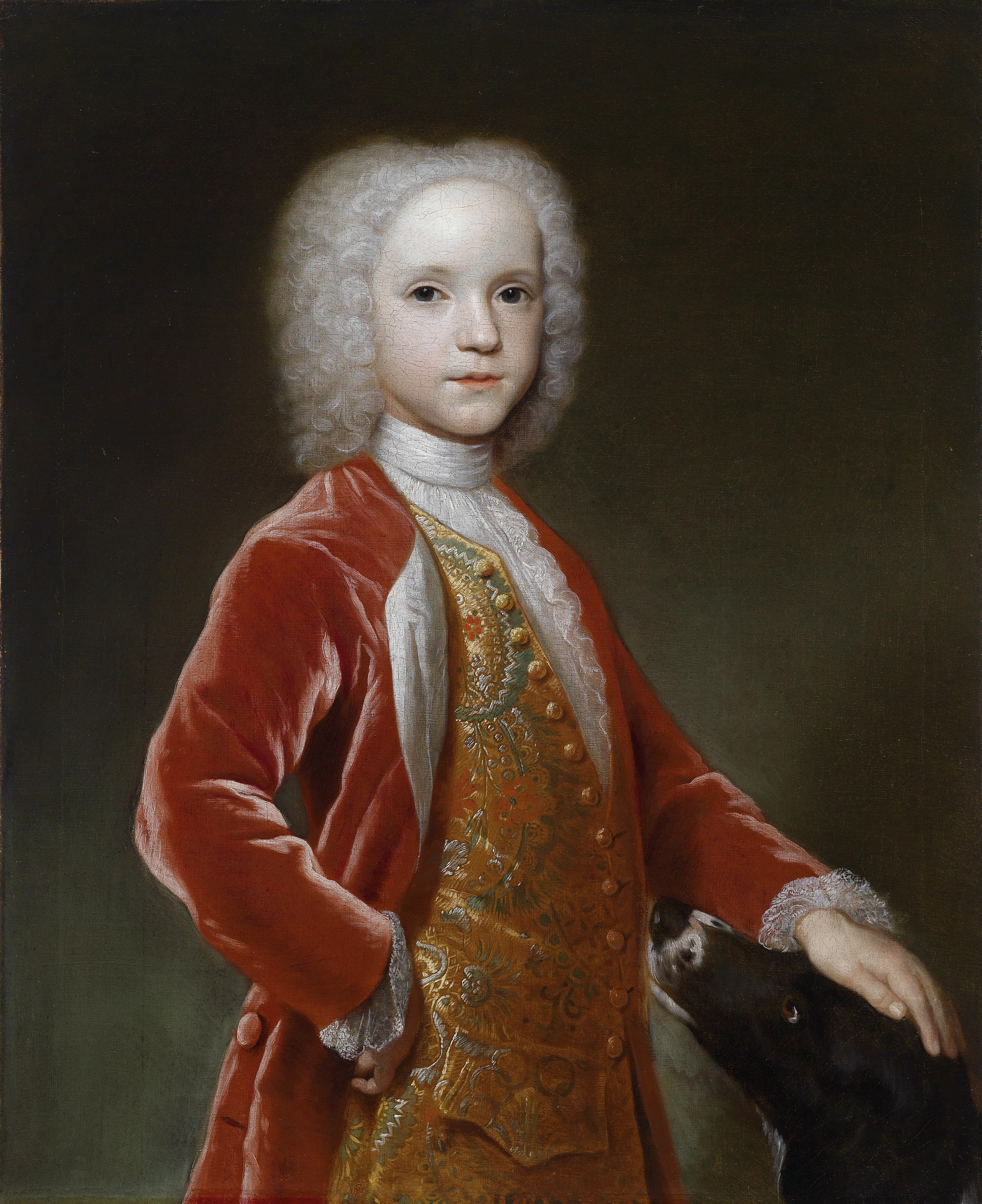
Portrait of Dodington by Hans Hysing

George Bubb Dodington, 1st Baron Melcombe, PC (1691 – 28 July 1762) was a British Whig politician who represented Winchelsea and Bridgwater in the House of Commons of Great Britain from 1715 to 1761.

== Family and early life ==
Christened George Bubb, he was the eldest son of Jeremiah Bubb of Foy, Herefordshire and his wife Mary Dodington, daughter of John Dodington of Dodington, Somerset. His father died in 1696 and he was taken under the care of his uncle George Dodington. He was educated at Winchester College in 1703 and matriculated at Exeter College, Oxford on 10 July 1707 aged 16. He was admitted at Lincoln's Inn in 1711 and undertook a Grand Tour from 1711 to 1713.

== Political career ==
Bubb's Name Act 1717
- Act of Parliament
- Parliament of Great Britain
- Long title: An Act to enable George Bubb Esquire and his Issue Male to change their Surname to the Surname of Doddington.
- Citation: 4 Geo. 1. c. 1 Pr.
- Territorial extent: Great Britain

Dates
- Royal assent: 3 February 1718
- Commencement: 21 November 1717 (Note: Start of session.)

Status: Current legislation

Bubb was returned as Member of Parliament for Winchelsea at the 1715 British general election. He was sent as envoy to Spain from 1715 to 1717. He changed his surname to Dodington by a private act of Parliament, Bubb's Name Act 1717 (4 Geo. 1. c. 1 Pr.). In 1720 he was appointed Clerk of the Pells for Ireland for life. His uncle died in 1720 and left him his estate. He was Lord Lieutenant of Somerset from 1721 to 1744. At the 1722 British general election he was returned as MP for Bridgwater.

He was taken up by Robert Walpole, who made him a Lord of the Treasury in 1724. He addressed an adulatory verse letter to Walpole in 1726, in which he praised loyalty as the supreme political virtue. He married Katherine Behan in secret, some time around 1725. He was returned again for Bridgwater at the 1727 British general election. Enormously rich, he became a friend of Frederick, Prince of Wales, who took advantage of their acquaintance to obtain loans that helped clear his debts, and, on being thrown out of St James's Palace by his father, King George II, moved into a London house belonging to Dodington.

Dodington was returned for Bridgwater again in 1734 when he was also returned for Melcombe Regis, and in 1741 when he was also returned for Appleby, choosing to remain at Bridgewater on both occasions. He was appointed Treasurer of the Navy in 1744 and became Privy Councillor on 3 January 1745. He was returned again for Bridgwater in 1747 and was treasurer of the chamber to the Prince of Wales from 1749 to 1751.

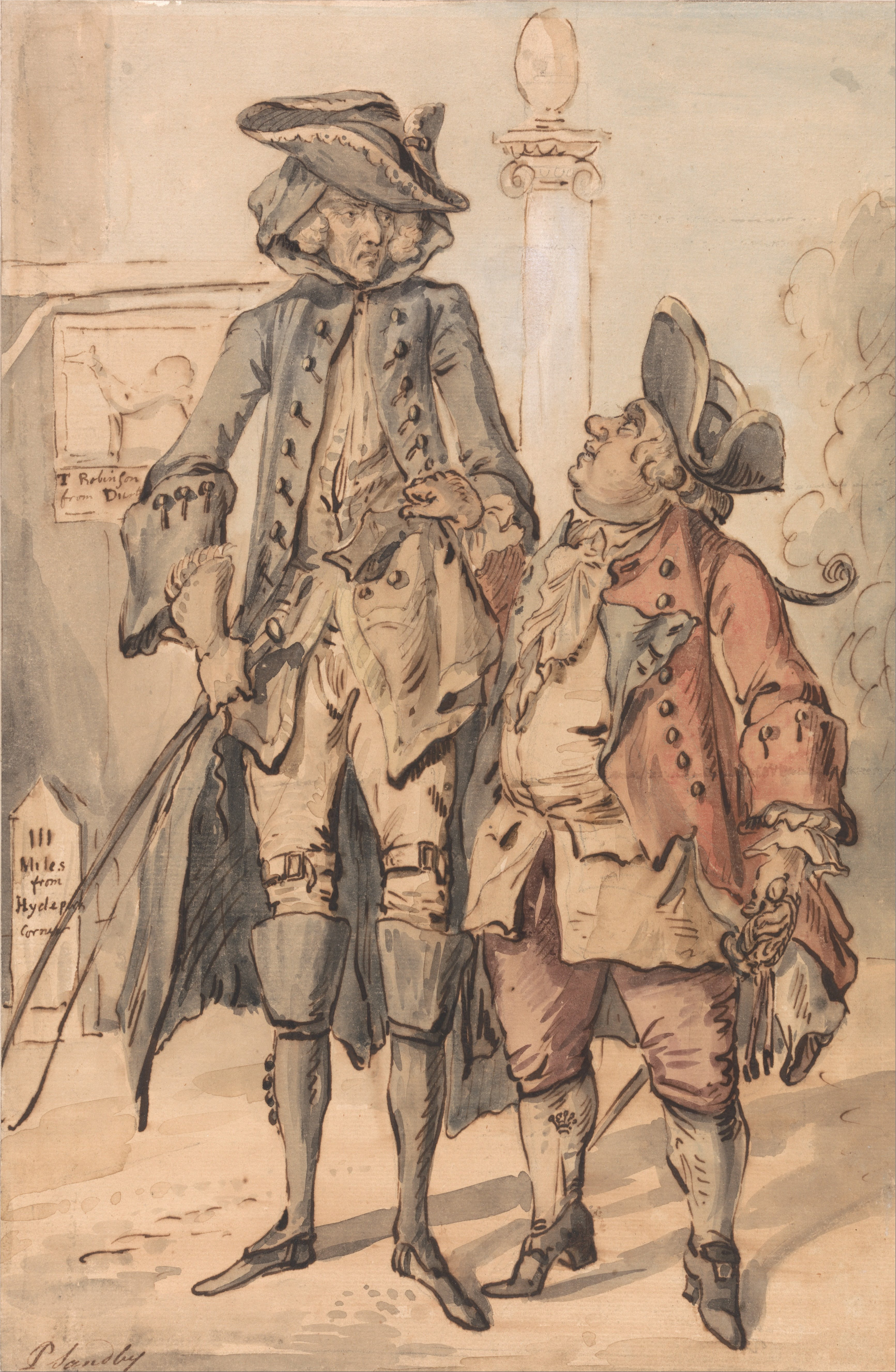
c. 1761 caricature of Dodington and Sir Thomas Robinson by Paul Sandby

Alongside his parliamentary roles, Dodington—together with the Earl of Chesterfield—backed opposition journalism and historiography. He retained William Guthrie and James Ralph for the Country Whig press (notably Old England) and then sponsored a paired historical enterprise: Guthrie’s A General History of England (1744–51) and Ralph’s History of England… (1744–46). When Dodington entered the Broad Bottom administration in 1744, Ralph received a Treasury pension of £200 per year; in 1753, under the Pelhams, he was granted £300 to cease pamphleteering. Ralph’s later opposition journalism included the 1753 weekly The Protester: before its launch, Dodington assured Ralph he would be “thoroughly protected … by those who would own him in both Houses,” and he later helped arrange the Treasury settlement via Lord Hartington after an introduction by David Garrick, on condition that Ralph cease political writing.

At the 1754 British general election, Dodington was returned for Melcombe Regis. He was Treasurer of the Navy again from December 1755 to November 1756. He was created Baron Melcombe on 6 April 1761.

== Collector and salonist ==
Dodington had many contacts with artists and was a collector, purchasing antiquities via Cardinal Albani in Rome. His house at Hammersmith, known as 'La Trappe' (an ironic reference to a Trappist monastery) was the focus of a lively political and cultural salon of supporters of Frederick, Prince of Wales whose palace at Kew was located just across the river. It was designed by the neo-Palladian architect Roger Morris who had been connected with the circle of Lord Burlington and the sculpture gallery was designed by the Italian architect and firework display designer Giovanni Niccolo Servandoni.

== Activities as a spy ==
Dodington is said to have been involved in a spy-ring, collecting valuable information about Jacobite activities. In 1761, following the accession of Frederick's son to the throne as George III, he was created Baron Melcombe.

Historian N.A.M. Rodger describes Dodington as an "indefatigable schemer" on behalf of his friends and interests of the time. Dodington is depicted in William Hogarth's 1761 engraving Five Orders of Periwigs.

== Diarist ==
His diary was published posthumously in 1784 by Henry Penruddocke Wyndham.

== Notes ==
Parliament of Great Britain
Preceded by Robert Bristow; George Dodington	Member of Parliament for Winchelsea; 1715–1722; With: Robert Bristow	Succeeded by Robert Bristow; Thomas Townshend
Preceded by Thomas Palmer; William Pitt	Member of Parliament for Bridgwater; 1722–1754; With: Thomas Palmer 1722–1727, 1731–1735; Sir Halswell Tynte, Bt 1727–1731; Sir Charles Wyndham, Bt 1735–1741; Vere Poulett 1741–1747; Peregrine Poulett 1747–1753; Robert Balch 1753–1754	Succeeded by Robert Balch; The Earl of Egmont
Preceded by Sir James Thornhill; Edward Tucker; Thomas Pearse; George Dodington	Member of Parliament for Weymouth and Melcombe Regis; 1734–1735; With: Edward Tucker; Thomas Pearse; George Dodington	Succeeded by Edward Tucker; Thomas Pearse; George Dodington; John Tucker
Preceded by Sir John Ramsden, Bt; Walter Plumer	Member of Parliament for Appleby; 1741; With: Sir John Ramsden, Bt	Succeeded by Sir John Ramsden, Bt; Sir Charles Wyndham, Bt
Preceded by Welbore Ellis; George Dodington; Edward Hungate Beaghan; Lord George Cavendish	Member of Parliament for Weymouth and Melcombe Regis; 1754–1761; With: Welbore Ellis; Lord John Cavendish; John Tucker	Succeeded by John Tucker; Sir Francis Dashwood, Bt; John Olmius; Richard Glover
Diplomatic posts
Preceded by Lord Bingley	British Ambassador to Spain; 1715–1717	Succeeded by John Chetwynd
Political offices
Preceded by Sir John Rushout, Bt	Treasurer of the Navy; 1744–1749	Succeeded by Henry Bilson-Legge
Preceded by George Grenville	Treasurer of the Navy; 1756	Succeeded by George Grenville
Honorary titles
Preceded by George Dodington	Lord Lieutenant of Somerset; 1720–1744	Succeeded by The Earl Poulett
Preceded by George Dodington	Vice-Admiral of Somerset; 1720–1762	Vacant Title next held by The Earl of Egmont
Peerage of Great Britain
New creation	Baron Melcombe; 1761–1762	Extinct
