= HMS Pembroke (1694) =

Ship of the line of the Royal Navy

History

Great Britain
- Name: HMS Pembroke
- Builder: Snelgrove, Deptford
- Launched: 22 November 1694
- Captured: 1709
- Fate: Sold 1713

Spain
- Name: Lanfranco
- Acquired: Purchased at Genoa in 1713
- Fate: Foundered in Buenos Aires in 1718

General characteristics
- Class & type: 60-gun fourth-rate ship of the line
- Tons burthen: 908
- Length: 145 ft (44.2 m) (gundeck)
- Beam: 37 ft 7.75 in (11.5 m)
- Depth of hold: 13 ft 9.5 in (4.2 m)
- Propulsion: Sails
- Sail plan: Full-rigged ship
- Armament: 60 guns of various weights of shot

HMS Pembroke was a 60-gun fourth-rate ship of the line of the Royal Navy, launched at Deptford on 22 November 1694.

Pembroke was captured by French warships in the Mediterranean in 1709, recaptured in 1711, and finally sold to Spain in Genoa in 1713 and renamed Lanfranco. She saw action in the Siege of Barcelona under D. Andrés del Pez and participated in the expeditions to Genoa in 1714, to Mallorca in 1715, and to South America in 1716. In 1718 she captured two French privateer frigates off Montevideo. She sank shortly after in Buenos Aires.

== The Pembroke's bell ==
Since the 1960s, the bell from Pembroke has served as a church bell at St. Bride's Anglican church in the town of Ōtorohanga, New Zealand. It was given to the church on its construction by a local family, the Westmacotts, and it was used for every service. The bell, which weighs 150 kg, was reported stolen from the church in the week beginning 13 June 2011. The bell's clapper, which was removed between uses is still in the church's possession. The bell was found by scrap metal merchants and returned.

== See also ==
- List of ships captured in the 18th century
