= William Harvey (1663–1731) =

English politician

William Harvey (1663 – 31 October 1731) was a British Tory politician.

He was baptised on 18 December 1663 and was the oldest surviving son of Sir Eliab Harvey and Dorothy (nee Whitmore) and the brother of Eliab Harvey. He was educated at St. Paul's School and Trinity College, Cambridge. He married Dorothy, the daughter of Sir Robert Dycer, 2nd Baronet on 23 November 1680 and had three sons and three daughters. His son, William sat as MP for Old Sarum.

He sat as MP for Old Sarum from 25 March 1689 till 1705, Appleby from 1705 till 1708, Old Sarum from 1708 till 1710, Weymouth and Melcombe Regis from 18 April 1711 till 1713 and 3 June 1714 till 1715. He was returned for Essex in a by-election in 1715 and sat as MP till 18 May 1716. He was re-elected to Essex in 1722 and did not stand in 1727.
