= Henry Thynne (1675–1708) =

English Tory politician

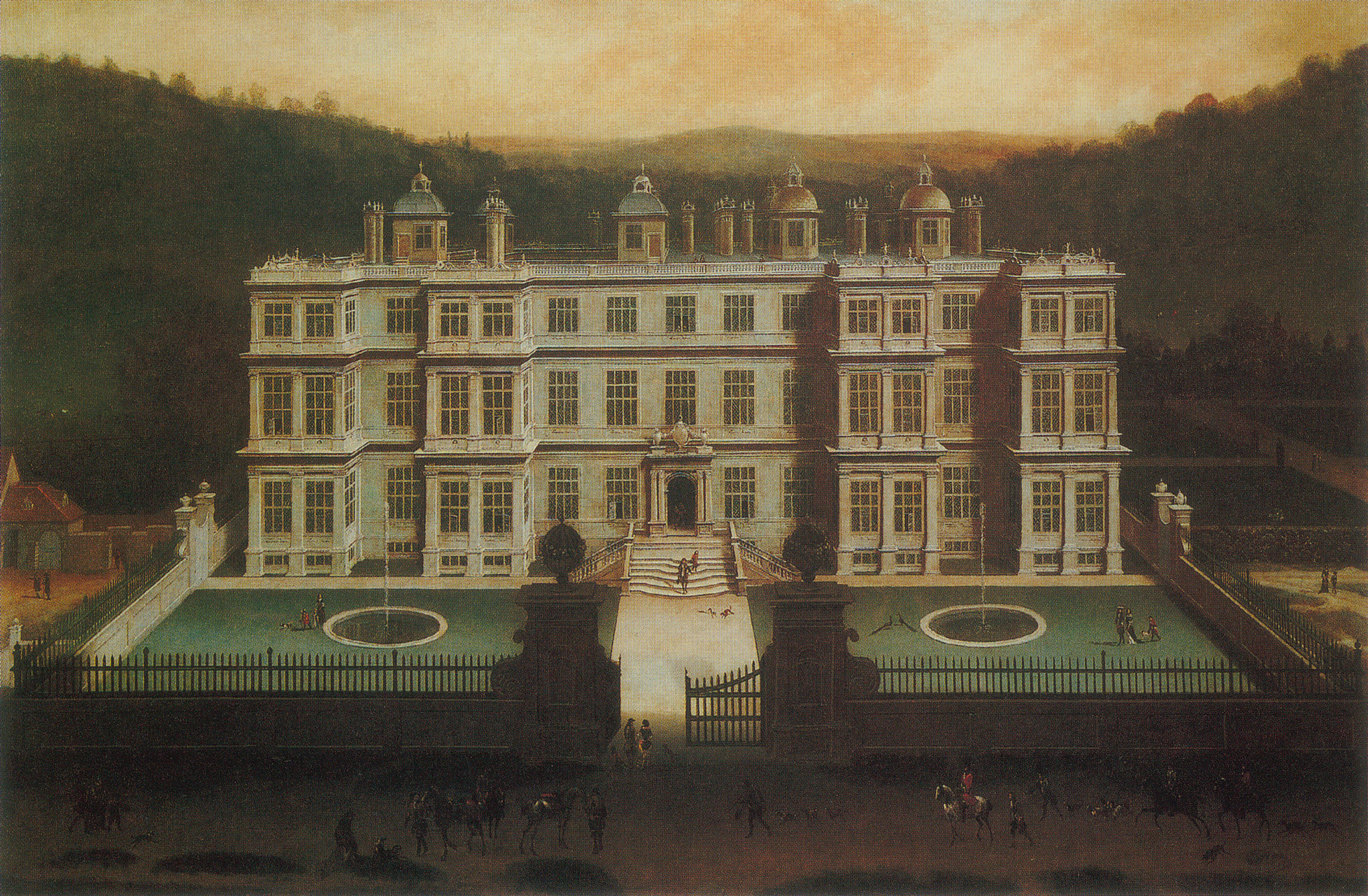
Longleat House, to which Thynne was the heir, by Jan Siberechts, ca. 1675

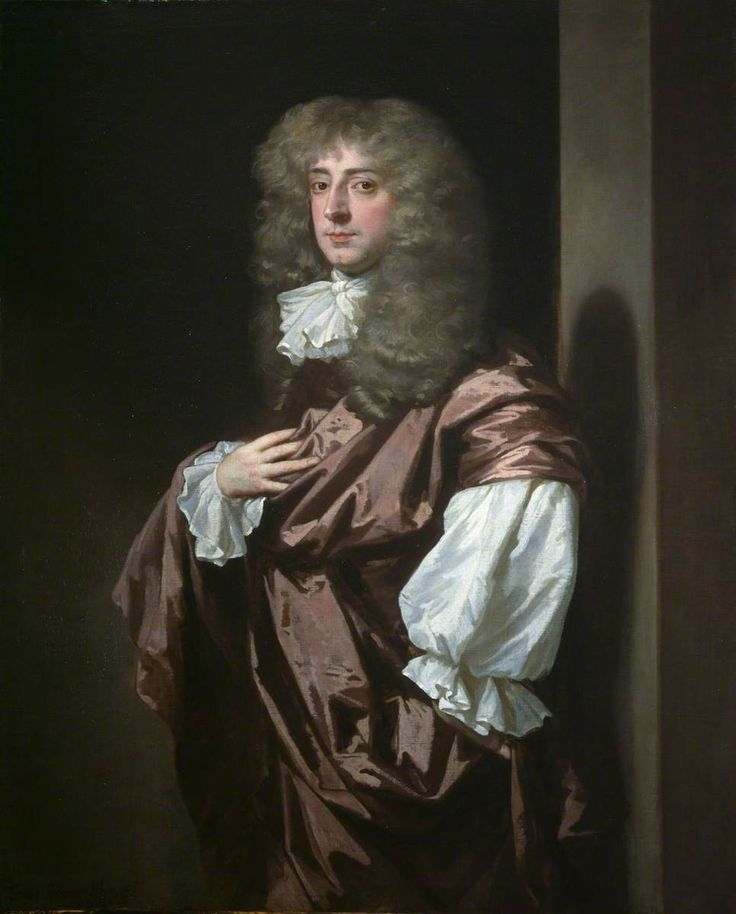
Thynne's father, Lord Weymouth

Hon. Henry Thynne (8 February 1675 – 20 December 1708) was an English Tory politician who sat in the English and British House of Commons from 1701 to 1708.

== Early life ==
Thynne was the eldest of the three sons of Thomas Thynne, 1st Viscount Weymouth (1640–1714), of Longleat, a substantial landowner in Wiltshire and Gloucestershire, by his marriage to Lady Frances Finch, a daughter of Heneage Finch, 3rd Earl of Winchilsea. He was christened on 16 February 1675 at Drayton Bassett. He was educated at home and was very interested in literature. In 1692 he visited the Netherlands, Germany and Italy. As a young man, he taught French and Italian to his contemporary Elizabeth Singer (1674–1737), in whom Bishop Thomas Ken, then living at Longleat, had taken an interest when she was twelve. He married Grace Strode, the daughter and heiress of Sir George Strode and Grace FitzJames, who brought him a fortune of £20,000 on 29 April 1695. In To the Painter of an Ill-Drawn Picture of Cleone, the Honorable Mrs Thynne, a poem by Anne Finch, Countess of Winchilsea, Thynne appears under the name of "Theanor", while "Cleone" was his wife Grace, to whom Lady Winchilsea addressed several of her poems.

== Career ==
At the 1695 English general election Thynne was put up as a candidate for parliament at Weobley but in an unpredictable borough was unsuccessful. He did not stand again until the first general election of 1701 when stood for Weobley again and as a backup at Weymouth and Melcombe Regis. He was rejected at Weobley again but was returned in a contest as Member of Parliament for Weymouth. He was not an active Member and was blacklisted for opposing the preparations for war with France. At the second general election of 1701, he stood at both Milborne Port and Tamworth and opted to sit for Tamworth. At Tamworth, he was returned unopposed with Thomas Guy (1644–1724), the speculator and founder of Guy's Hospital. Guy was a Whig, while Thynne was a Tory. Thynne supported the motion on 26 February 1702 which vindicated the Commons' proceedings in the impeaching the Whig lords. He was returned again as MP for Weymouth and Melcombe Regis at the 1702 English general election. He voted against agreeing with the Lords' amendments to the bill increasing the time for taking the oath of abjuration on 13 February 1703, but in April 1703, he fell ill, and was described by his father as 'overrun with the spleen'. He voted for the Tack on 28 November 1704. At the 1705 English general election, he was returned again as Tory MP for Weymouth and voted against the Court candidate for Speaker on 25 October 1705. He became less active in Parliament. At the 1708 British general election he was returned for two constituencies, Weymouth and Weobley, and chose to sit for Weymouth, before his sudden death.

== Later life and legacy ==
Thynne became extremely obese. After he had died suddenly on 20 December 1708, the findings of a post mortem were reported in a letter to Edward Harley from his sister:

Though he never complained, his vitals were wholly corrupted, his heart was like a lump of fat and blood, when they touched his lungs they fell to pieces and had an imposthume in them which they think was the cause of his sudden death, his liver wasted, and an ulcer in his kidneys, and a dropsy in one side of his belly. I think this a strange mixture of distempers, but more unaccountable that he should not be sensible of any of them, but told his father and cousin at 12 o'clock the night before he died that he was as well as ever in his life, did not alter two minutes before his death, only said when he came downstairs his legs were weak, did not sit by his lady above six minutes before he died.

On 3 January 1709 he was buried at Longbridge Deverill. He had two daughters, Frances Thynne, who married Algernon Seymour, 7th Duke of Somerset, and Mary Thynne (ca. 1702–1720), who married William Greville, 7th Baron Brooke (1695–1727). His grandchildren included Elizabeth Percy, Duchess of Northumberland.

== Notes ==
Parliament of England
Preceded by Arthur Shallett; Philip Taylor; Michael Harvey; Thomas Freke	Member of Parliament for Weymouth and Melcombe Regis; 1701; With: Michael Harvey; Charles Churchill; Maurice Ashley	Succeeded by Charles Churchill; Maurice Ashley; Sir Christopher Wren; George St Loe
Preceded by Thomas Guy; Sir Henry Gough	Member of Parliament for Tamworth; 1701–1702; With: Thomas Guy	Succeeded by Thomas Guy; Joseph Girdler
Preceded by Charles Churchill; Sir Christopher Wren; George St Loe; Anthony Henley	Member of Parliament for Weymouth and Melcombe Regis; 1702–1707; With: Charles Churchill 1702–1707; George St Loe 1702–1705; Anthony Henley 1702–1707; Maurice Ashley 1705–1707	Succeeded by Parliament of Great Britain
Parliament of Great Britain
Preceded by Parliament of England	Member of Parliament for Weymouth and Melcombe Regis; 1707–1708; With: Charles Churchill; Anthony Henley; Maurice Ashley	Succeeded by Charles Churchill; Anthony Henley; Maurice Ashley; Edward Clavell
Preceded by Henry Cornewall; John Birch	Member of Parliament for Weobley; 1708; With: John Birch	Succeeded by John Birch; Henry Gorges
