= Maurice Ashley (MP) =

English Whig politician

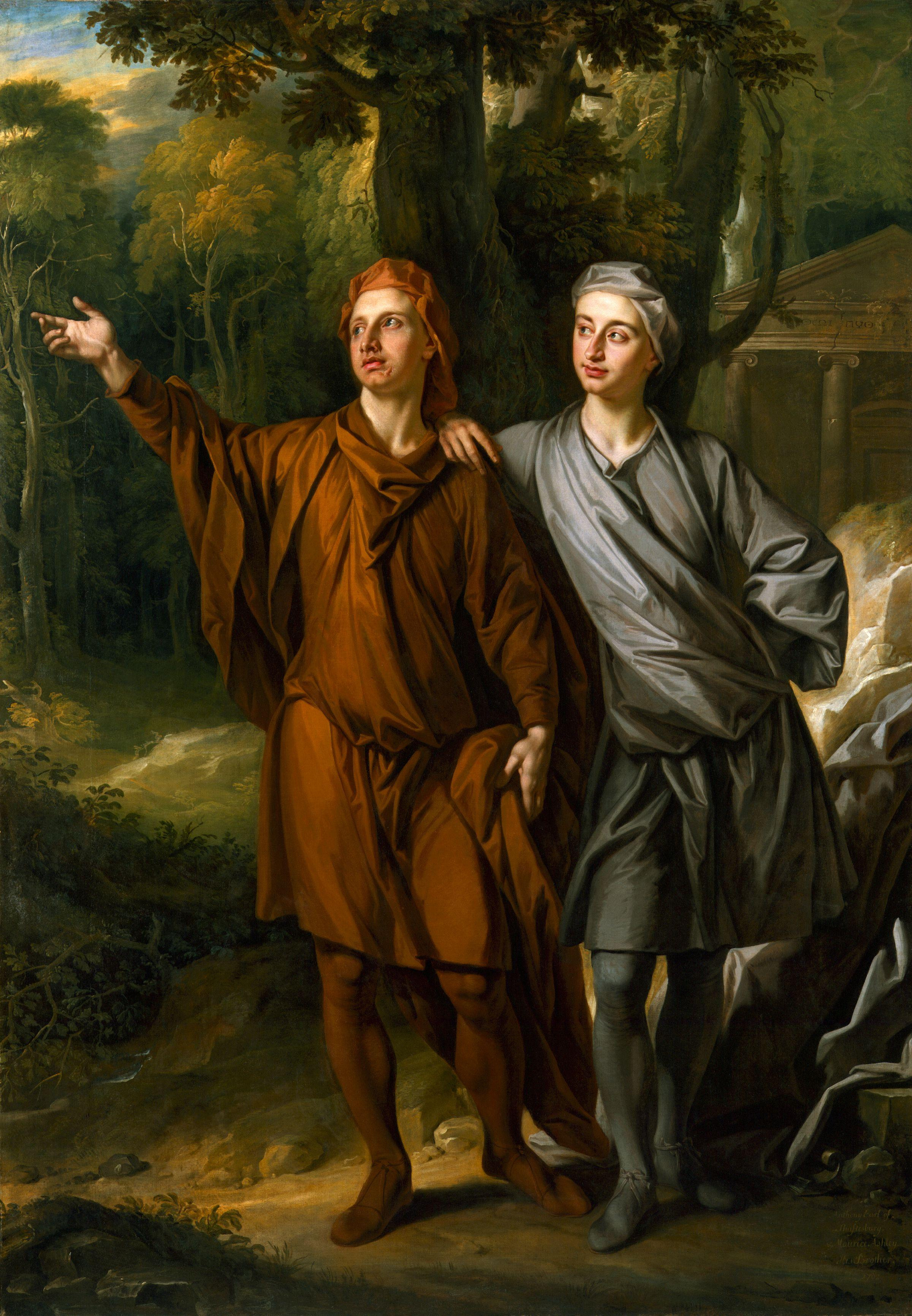
1700–1701 portrait of Maurice (right) by John Closterman

Maurice Ashley (14 April 1675 – 21 October 1726), of Bedford Row, Westminster, was an English Whig politician who sat in the English and British House of Commons between 1695 and 1713.

== Family ==
Ashley was born in 1675, the third son of Lord Ashley, MP, who succeeded as Earl of Shaftesbury in 1683. Maurice Ashley attended Winchester College from circa 1682 to 1689 but after seven years had little to show for his time there. His brother suggested he should spend some time at Utrecht under the guidance of a private tutor which did effect some improvement.

== Political career ==
Although still a minor, Ashley was returned unopposed as Member of Parliament for Weymouth and Melcombe Regis on his father's interest at the 1695 general election. He did not seek re-election at the 1698 English general election. After his father's death, his brother the 3rd Earl of Shaftesbury settled on him an estate of £1,000 a year.

Ashley was returned again as MP for Weymouth for Melcombe Regis, at the January 1701 general election. The next election took place later that year in November/December, when he was elected for two seats, Weymouth and Melcombe Regis and Wiltshire. On 20 January 1702 he chose to sit for Wiltshire, but a few months later was defeated at the 1702 English general election. Ashley and his brother were on bad terms by this time, mainly on account of Ashley's election expenses.

At the 1705 English general election Ashley was returned successfully as a Whig MP for Weymouth and Melcombe Regis. He voted for the Court candidate as Speaker on 25 October 1705 but was otherwise an inactive Member. Ashley and his brother continued on bad terms, particularly as Ashley's hot temperament, was becoming an embarrassment and a threat to Shaftesbury's political aspirations. He was re-elected as a Whig at the 1708 British general election and supported the naturalization of the Palatines in 1709 and voted for the impeachment of Dr Sacheverell in 1710. He was returned again at the 1710 British general election. and voted for the motion of ‘No Peace Without Spain’ on 7 December 1711 and against the French commerce bill on 18 June 1713. He stood down at the 1713 British general election.

Ashley married Catherine Popple, daughter of the merchant William Popple in 1709. She died without issue in 1721. He died in 1726 and was buried at Purton, Wiltshire.

Parliament of England
Preceded by Sir John Morton, Bt; Michael Harvey; Thomas Freke; Henry Henning	Member of Parliament for Weymouth and Melcombe Regis; 1695–1698; With: Michael Harvey; Thomas Freke; John Knight (1695–98); Philip Taylor (1698)	Succeeded by Philip Taylor; Arthur Shallett; Michael Harvey; Thomas Freke
Preceded by Philip Taylor; Arthur Shallett; Michael Harvey; Thomas Freke	Member of Parliament for Weymouth and Melcombe Regis; 1701–1702; With: The Hon. Henry Thynne (1701); Michael Harvey (1701); Charles Churchill; George St Lo (1701–02); Sir Christopher Wren (1701–02)	Succeeded by Charles Churchill; George St Lo; Sir Christopher Wren; Anthony Henley
Preceded by Sir George Hungerford; Richard Howe	Member of Parliament for Wiltshire; 1701–1702; With: William Ashe	Succeeded by Richard Howe; Robert Hyde
Preceded by The Hon. Henry Thynne; Anthony Henley; Charles Churchill; George St Lo	Member of Parliament for Weymouth and Melcombe Regis; 1705–1707; With: Charles Churchill; Anthony Henley; The Hon. Henry Thynne	Succeeded by Parliament of Great Britain
Parliament of Great Britain
Preceded by Parliament of England	Member of Parliament for Weymouth and Melcombe Regis; 1707–1713; With: Charles Churchill (1707–10); Anthony Henley (1707–11); The Hon. Henry Thynne (1707–08); Edward Clavell (1709–10); William Betts (1710–11); James Littleton (1710–11); Sir Thomas Hardy (1711–13); William Harvey (1711–13); Reginald Marriott (1711–13)	Succeeded by John Baker; James Littleton; Daniel Harvey; William Betts
