= Christopher Wren =

English architect (1632–1723)

Sir Christopher Wren FRS
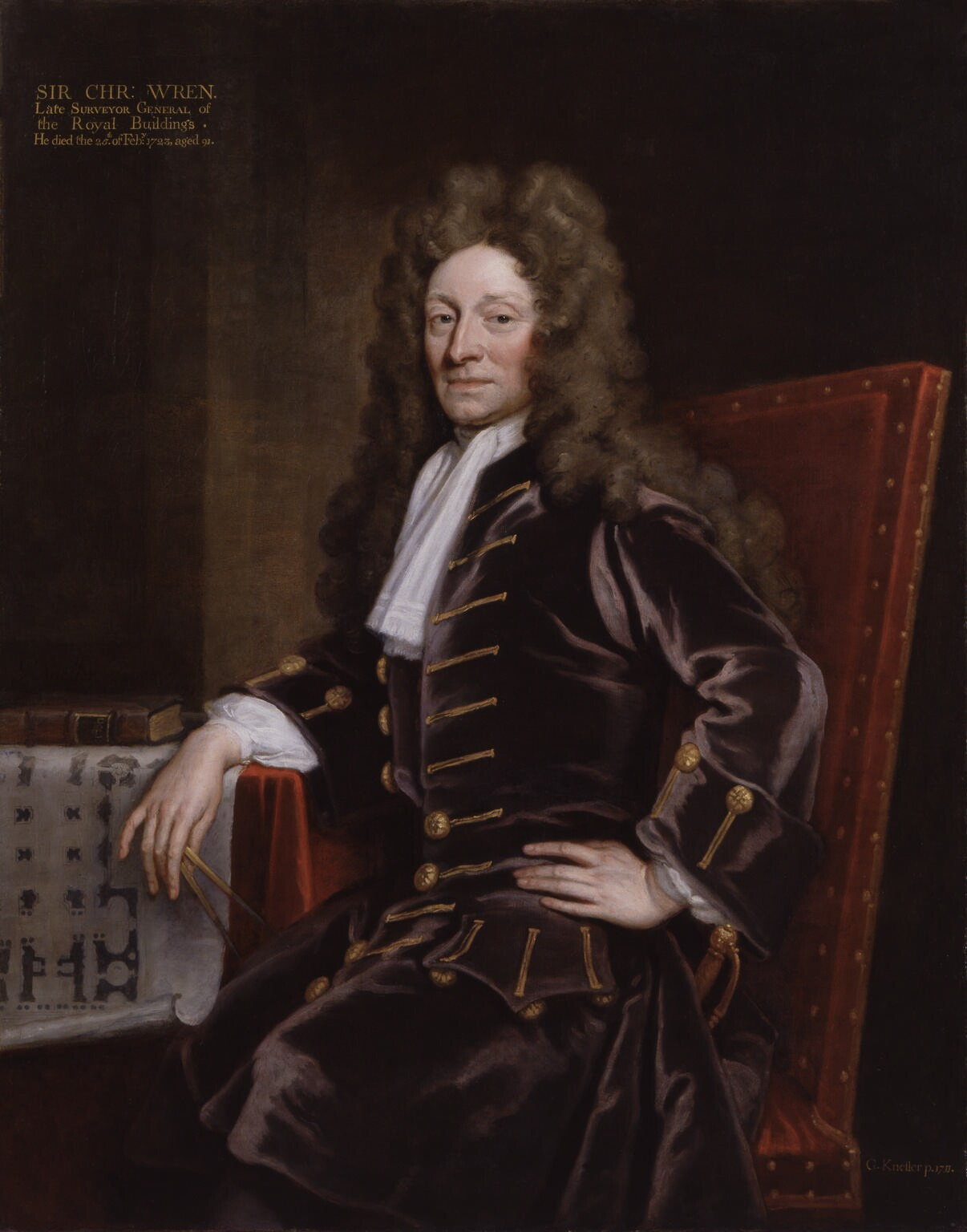
- Portrait of Sir Christopher Wren (1711)
- Born: 30 October 1632 [O.S. 20 October] East Knoyle, Wiltshire, England
- Died: 8 March 1723 [O.S. 25 February] (aged 90) (Note: From the 12th century to 1752, the legal year in England began on 25 March Old Style. Wren died in 1722 O.S. according to the pre-1752 calendar (see Paul Welberry Kent, Allan Chapman, eds., Robert Hooke and the English Renaissance, Gracewing Publishing, 2005, p. 47). However, here the year is considered to start on 1 January to avoid confusion about his age at death.); St James's, London, England
- Resting place: St Paul's Cathedral, London
- Education: Wadham College, Oxford
- Known for: Designer of 54 London churches, including St Paul's Cathedral, as well as many notable secular buildings in London after the Great Fire
- Political party: Whig
- Spouses: Faith Coghill (m. 1669; died 1675) Jane Fitzwilliam (m. 1677; died 1680)
- Children: 4
- Father: Christopher Wren the Elder
- Scientific career
- Fields: Architecture, physics, astronomy, mathematics
- Workplaces: All Souls' College, Oxford
- Academic advisors: William Oughtred

Surveyor of the King's Works
- In office 1669–1718
- Preceded by: John Denham
- Succeeded by: William Benson

3rd President of the Royal Society
- In office 1680–1682
- Preceded by: Joseph Williamson
- Succeeded by: John Hoskyns

Member of the English Parliament
- 1701–1702: Weymouth and Melcombe Regis
- 6 March – 17 May 1690 11 January – 14 May 1689: New Windsor
- 1685–1687: Plympton Erle

Sir Christopher Wren (/rɛn/; 30 October 1632 [O.S. 20 October] – 8 March 1723 [O.S. 25 February]) (Note: Here both Old Style and New Style dates are given, with "Old Style" meaning "according to the Julian calendar but with the year starting on 1 January." Dates elsewhere in this article are Old Style in the same way, except where both styles are given. Using New Style dates for Wren's birth and death, even though he lived in England in the Old Style era, avoids confusion about his age at death.) was an English architect, astronomer, mathematician and physicist who is one of the most highly acclaimed architects in the history of England. Known for his work in the English Baroque style, he was accorded responsibility for rebuilding 52 churches in the City of London after the Great Fire in 1666, including what is regarded as his masterpiece, St Paul's Cathedral, on Ludgate Hill, completed in 1710.

The principal creative responsibility for a number of the churches is now more commonly attributed to others in his office, especially Nicholas Hawksmoor. Other notable buildings by Wren include the Royal Hospital Chelsea, the Old Royal Naval College, Greenwich, and the south front of Hampton Court Palace. Educated in Latin and Aristotelian physics at the University of Oxford, Wren was a founder of the Royal Society and served as its president from 1680 to 1682. His scientific work was highly regarded by Isaac Newton and Blaise Pascal.

== Life and works ==
Wren was born in East Knoyle in Wiltshire, the only surviving son of Christopher Wren the Elder and Mary Cox, the only child of the Wiltshire squire Robert Cox from Fonthill Bishop. Christopher Sr. was, at that time, the rector of East Knoyle and, later, Dean of Windsor. It was while they were living at East Knoyle that all their children were born; Mary, Catherine and Susan were all born by 1628, but then several children who were born died within a few weeks of their birth. Christopher was born in 1632. Then, two years later, another daughter named Elizabeth was born. Mary must have died shortly after the birth of Elizabeth, although there does not appear to be any surviving record of the date. Through Mary Cox, however, the family became well off financially for, as the only heir, she had inherited her father's estate.

As a child Wren "seem'd consumptive". Although a sickly child, he would survive into robust old age. He was first taught at home by a private tutor and his father. After his father's royal appointment as Dean of Windsor in March 1635, his family spent part of each year there, but little is known about Wren's life at Windsor. He spent his first eight years at East Knoyle and was educated by the Rev. William Shepherd, a local clergyman.

Little is known of Wren's schooling thereafter, during dangerous times when his father's Royal associations would have required the family to keep a very low profile from the ruling Parliamentary authorities. It was a tough time in his life, but one which would go on to have a significant impact upon his later works. The story that he was at Westminster School between 1641 and 1646 is substantiated only by Parentalia, the biography compiled by his son, a fourth Christopher, which places him there "for some short time" before going up to Oxford (in 1650); however, it is entirely consistent with headmaster Doctor Busby's well-documented practice of educating the sons of impoverished Royalists and Puritans alike, irrespective of current politics or his own position.

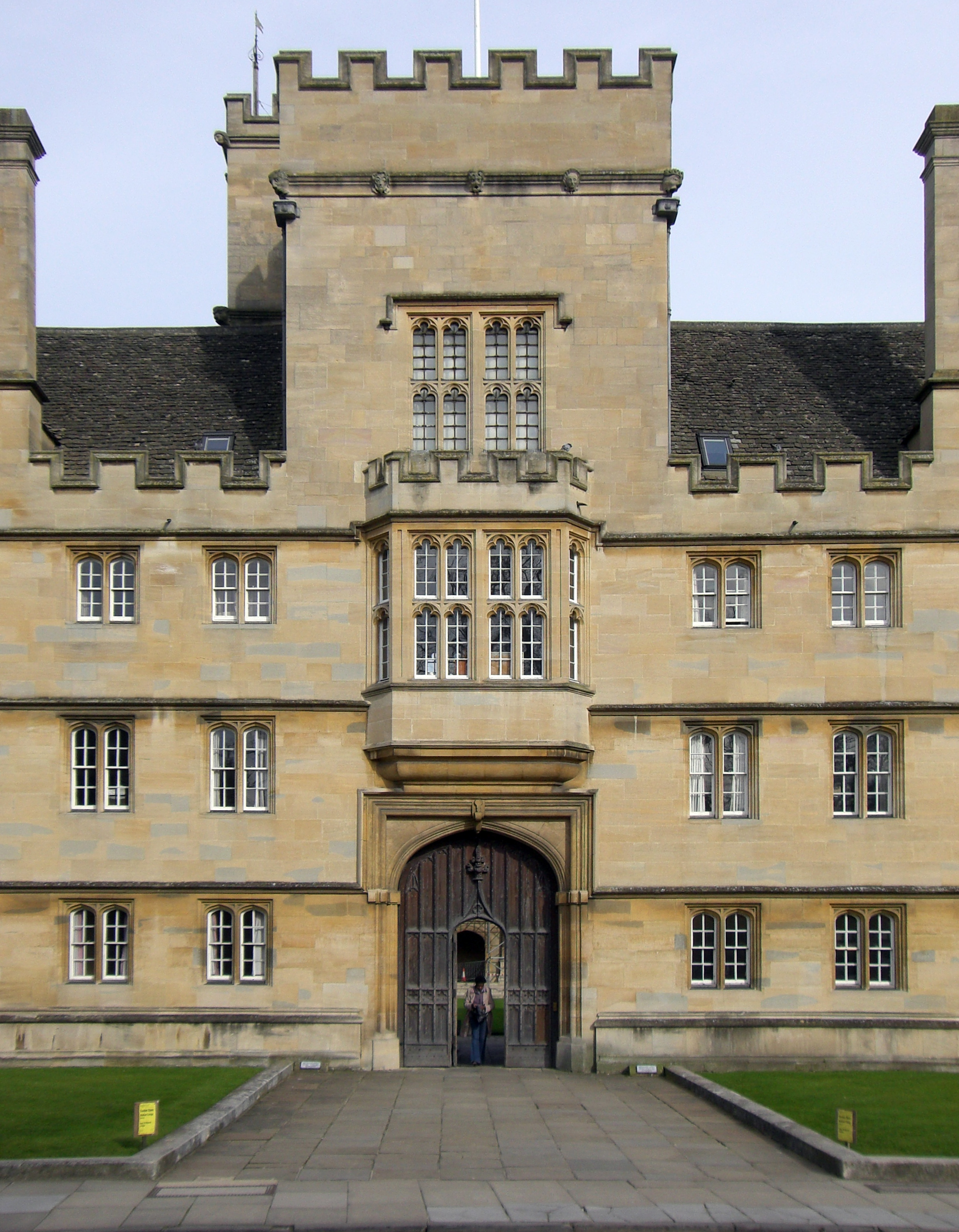
Wadham College, Oxford, where Wren was a student in 1650–51

Some of Wren's youthful exercises preserved or recorded (though few are datable) showed that he received a thorough grounding in Latin and also learned to draw. According to Parentalia, he was "initiated" in the principles of mathematics by William Holder, who married Wren's elder sister Susan (or Susanna) in 1643. His drawing was put to academic use in providing many of the anatomical drawings for the anatomy textbook of the brain, Cerebri Anatome (1664), published by Thomas Willis, who coined the term "neurology". During this time period, Wren became interested in the design and construction of mechanical instruments. It was probably through Holder that Wren met Sir Charles Scarburgh whom Wren assisted in his anatomical studies. Another sister Anne Brunsell, married a clergyman and is buried in Stretham.

On 25 June 1650, Wren entered Wadham College, Oxford, where he studied Latin and the works of Aristotle. It is anachronistic to imagine that he received scientific training in the modern sense. However, Wren became closely associated with John Wilkins, the Warden of Wadham. The Wilkins circle was a group whose activities led to the formation of the Royal Society, comprising a number of distinguished mathematicians, creative workers and experimental philosophers. This connection probably influenced Wren's studies of science and mathematics at Oxford. He graduated B.A. in 1651, and two years later received M.A.

=== 1653–1664 ===
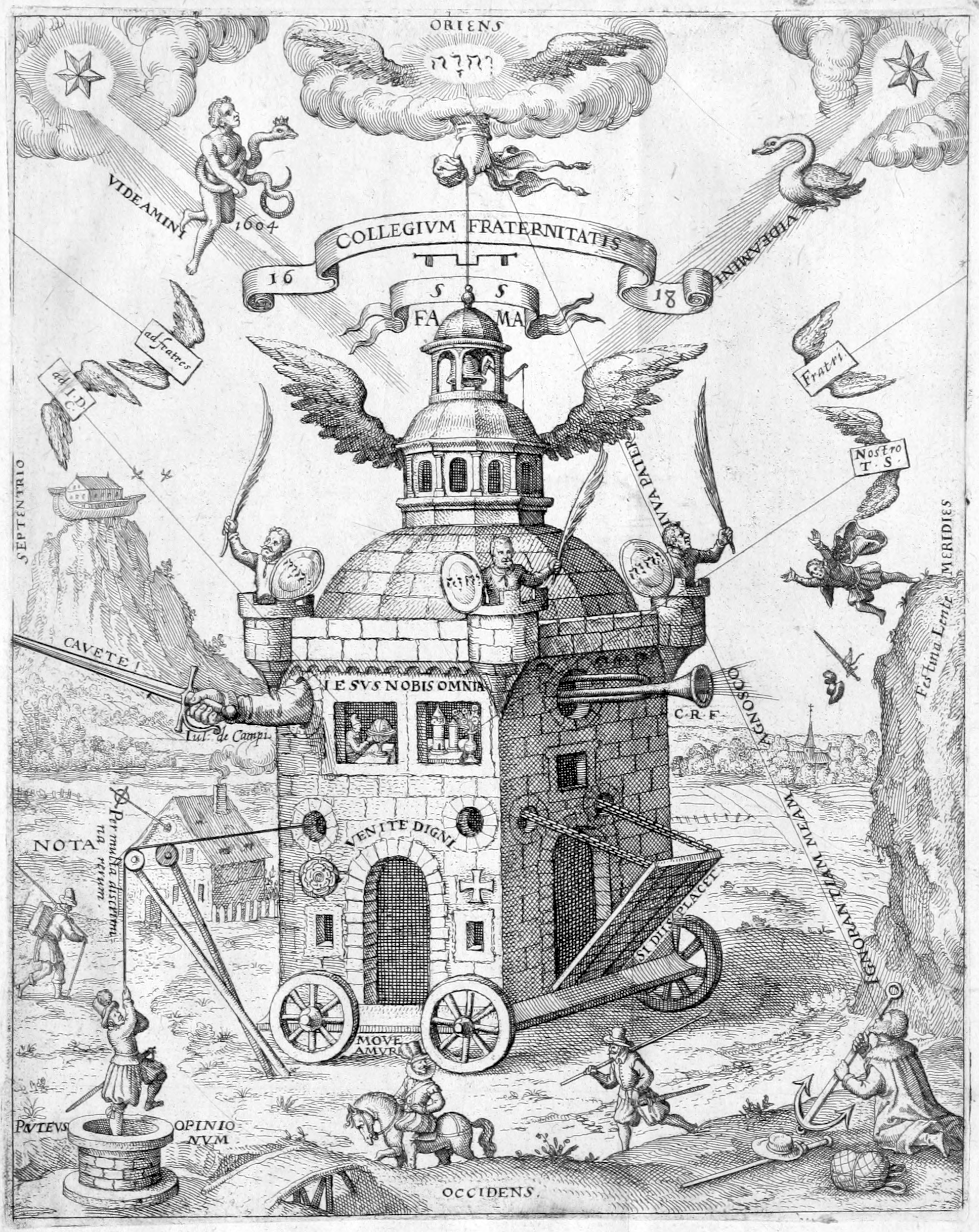
Wren was part of the group around John Wilkins, known as the Invisible College. This is the emblematic image of a Rosicrucian College, an illustration from Speculum sophicum Rhodo-stauroticum, a 1618 work by Theophilus Schweighardt.

After receiving his M.A. in 1653, Wren was elected a fellow of All Souls' College in the same year and began an active period of research and experiment in Oxford. Among these were a number of physiological experiments on dogs, including one now recognized as the first injection of fluids into the bloodstream of a live animal under laboratory conditions. At Oxford he became part of the group around John Wilkins, he was key to the correspondence network known as the Invisible College, Within the arms of All Souls, the arms of Wren's friend Robert Boyle appear in the colonnade of the Great Quadrangle, opposite the arms of the Hill family of Shropshire, close by a sundial designed by Boyle's friend Wren.

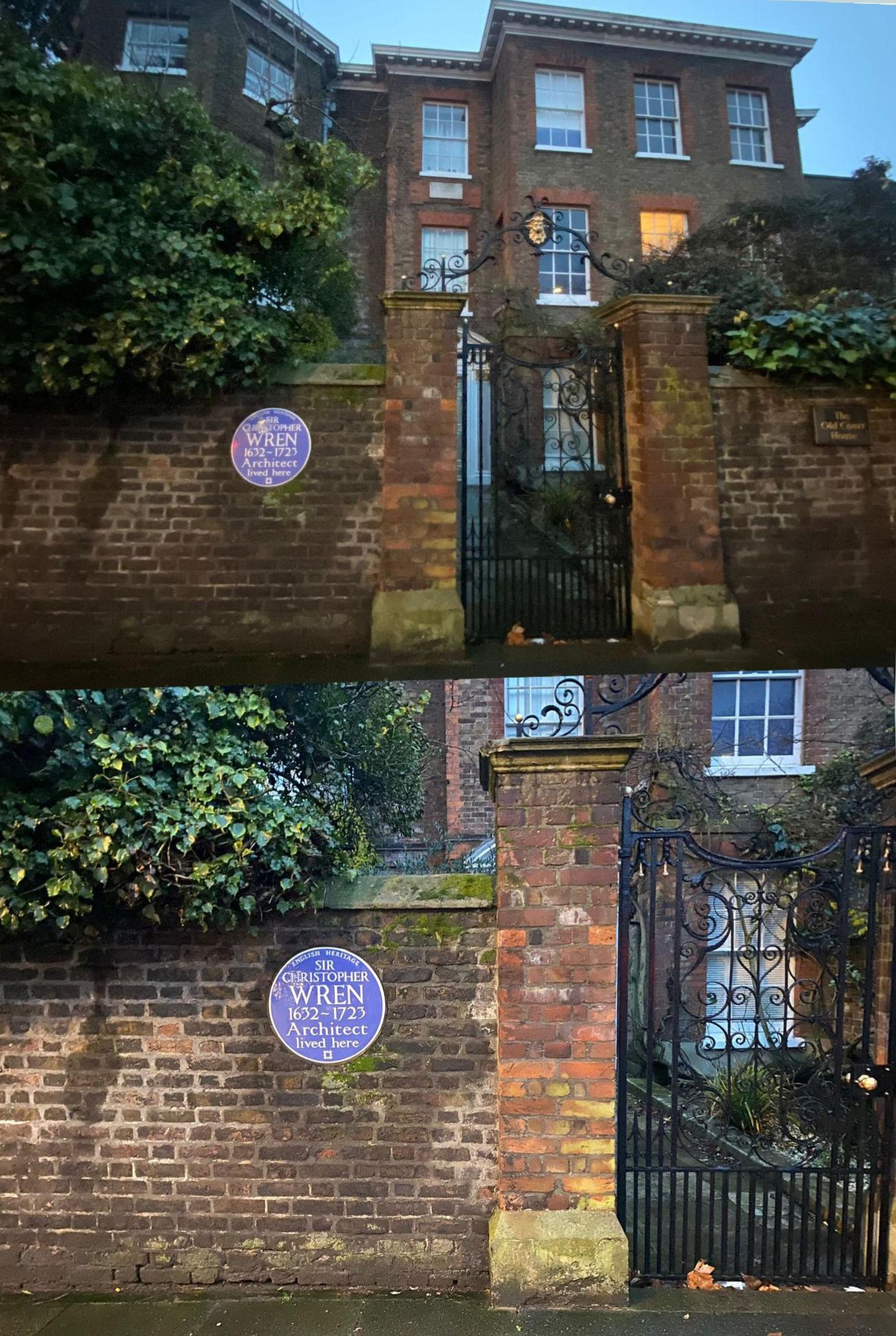
Christopher Wren's home in Hampton, UK. It is located opposite the Hampton Court Palace's main gate.

His days as a fellow of All Souls ended when Wren was appointed Professor of Astronomy at Gresham College, London, in 1657. He was there provided with a set of rooms and a stipend and required to give weekly lectures in both Latin and English. Wren took up this new work with enthusiasm. He continued to meet the men with whom he had frequent discussions in Oxford. They attended his London lectures and in 1660, initiated formal weekly meetings. It was from these meetings that the Royal Society, England's premier scientific body, was to develop. He undoubtedly played a major role in the early life of what would become the Royal Society; his great breadth of expertise in so many different subjects helped in the exchange of ideas between the various scientists. In fact, the report on one of these meetings reads:

Memorandum November 28, 1660. These persons following according to the usual custom of most of them, met together at Gresham College to hear Mr Wren's lecture, viz. The Lord Brouncker, Mr Boyle, Mr Bruce, Sir Robert Moray, Sir Paule Neile, Dr Wilkins, Dr Goddard, Dr Petty, Mr Ball, Mr Rooke, Mr Wren, Mr Hill. And after the lecture was ended they did according to the usual manner, withdraw for mutual converse.

In 1662, they proposed a society "for the promotion of Physico-Mathematicall Experimental Learning". This body received its Royal Charter from Charles II and "The Royal Society of London for Improving Natural Knowledge" was formed. In addition to being a founder member of the Society, Wren was president of the Royal Society from 1680 to 1682.

In 1661, Wren was elected Savilian Professor of Astronomy at Oxford, and in 1669 he was appointed Surveyor of Works to Charles II. From 1661 until 1668 Wren's life was based in Oxford, although his attendance at meetings of the Royal Society meant that he had to make periodic trips to London.

The main sources for Wren's scientific achievements are the records of the Royal Society. His scientific works ranged from astronomy, optics, the problem of finding longitude at sea, cosmology, mechanics, microscopy, surveying, medicine and meteorology. He observed, measured, dissected, built models and employed, invented and improved a variety of instruments.

=== 1665–1723 ===
It was probably around this time that Christopher Wren was drawn into redesigning a battered St Paul's Cathedral. Making a trip to Paris in 1665, Wren studied architecture, which had reached a climax of creativity, and perused the drawings of Bernini, the great Italian sculptor and architect, who himself was visiting Paris at the time. Returning from Paris, he made his first design for St Paul's. A week later, however, the Great Fire destroyed two-thirds of the city. Wren submitted his plans for rebuilding the city to King Charles II, although they were never adopted. With his appointment as King's Surveyor of Works in 1669, he had a presence in the general process of rebuilding the city, but was not directly involved with the rebuilding of houses or companies' halls. Instead, Wren was personally responsible for the rebuilding of 51 churches; however, it is not necessarily true to say that each of them represented his own fully developed design.

Wren was knighted on 14 November 1673. This honour was bestowed on him after his resignation from the Savilian chair in Oxford, by which time he had already begun to make his mark as an architect, both in services to the Crown and in playing an important part in rebuilding London after the Great Fire.

Additionally, he was sufficiently active in public affairs to be returned as Member of Parliament on four occasions. Wren first stood for Parliament in a by-election in 1667 for the Cambridge University constituency, losing by six votes to Sir Charles Wheler. He was unsuccessful again in a by-election for the Oxford University constituency in 1674, losing to Thomas Thynne. At his third attempt Wren was successful, and he sat for Plympton Erle during the Loyal Parliament of 1685 to 1687. Wren was returned for New Windsor on 11 January 1689 in the general election, but his election was declared void on 14 May 1689. He was elected again for New Windsor on 6 March 1690, but this election was declared void on 17 May 1690. Over a decade later he was elected unopposed for Weymouth and Melcombe Regis at the November 1701 general election. He retired at the general election the following year.

=== Marriage to Faith Coghill Wren ===
Wren's career was well established by 1669, and it may have been his appointment as Surveyor of the King's Works early that year that persuaded him that he could finally afford to marry. In 1669, the 37-year-old Wren married his childhood neighbour, the 33-year-old Faith Coghill, daughter of Sir John Coghill of Bletchingdon. Little is known of Faith, but a love letter from Wren survives, which reads, in part:

I have sent your Watch at last & envy the felicity of it, that it should be soe near your side & soe often enjoy your Eye. ... .but have a care for it, for I have put such a spell into it; that every Beating of the Balance will tell you 'tis the Pulse of my Heart, which labors as much to serve you and more trewly than the Watch; for the Watch I beleeve will sometimes lie, and sometimes be idle & unwilling ... but as for me you may be confident I shall never ...

This brief marriage produced two children: Gilbert, born October 1672, who suffered from convulsions and died at about 18 months old, and Christopher, born February 1675. The younger Christopher was trained by his father to be an architect. It was this Christopher that supervised the topping out ceremony of St Paul's in 1710 and wrote the famous Parentalia, or, Memoirs of the family of the Wrens. Faith Wren died of smallpox on 3 September 1675. She was buried in the chancel of St Martin-in-the-Fields beside the infant Gilbert. A few days later Wren's mother-in-law, Lady Coghill, arrived to take the infant Christopher back with her to Oxfordshire to raise.

=== Marriage to Jane Fitzwilliam ===
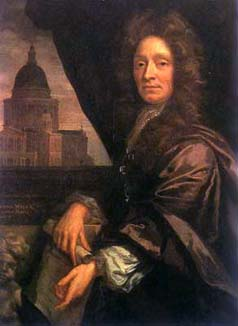
Wren, portrait c. 1690 by John Closterman

In 1677, 17 months after the death of his first wife, Wren remarried, this time to Jane Fitzwilliam, daughter of William FitzWilliam, 2nd Baron FitzWilliam, and his wife Jane Perry, the daughter of a prosperous London merchant.

She was a mystery to Wren's friends and companions. Robert Hooke, who often saw Wren two or three times every week, had, as he recorded in his diary, never even heard of her, and was not to meet her till six weeks after the marriage. As with the first marriage, this too produced two children: a daughter Jane (1677–1702); and a son William, "Poor Billy" born June 1679, who was reportedly handicapped in some way and it is also known that he never married.

Like the first, this second marriage was also brief. Jane Wren is believed to have died of tuberculosis in September 1680 although this cannot be confirmed. She was buried alongside Faith and Gilbert in the chancel of St Martin-in-the-Fields. Wren was never to marry again; he lived to be over 90 years old and of those years was married only twice.

Bletchingdon was the home of Wren's brother-in-law William Holder, who was rector of the local church. Holder had been a Fellow of Pembroke College, Oxford. An intellectual of considerable ability, he is said to have been the figure who introduced Wren to arithmetic and geometry.

Wren's later life was not without criticisms and attacks on his competence and his taste. In 1712, the Letter Concerning Design of Anthony Ashley Cooper, third Earl of Shaftesbury, circulated in manuscript. Proposing a new British style of architecture, Shaftesbury censured Wren's cathedral, his taste and his long-standing control of royal works. Although Wren was appointed to the Fifty New Churches Commission in 1711, he was left only with nominal charge of a board of works when the surveyorship started in 1715. On 26 April 1718, on the pretext of failing powers, he was dismissed in favour of William Benson.

In 1713, he bought the manor of Wroxall, Warwickshire, from the Burgoyne family, to which his son Christopher retired in 1716 after losing his post as Clerk of Works. Several of Wren's descendants would be buried there in the Church of St Leonard.

=== Death ===
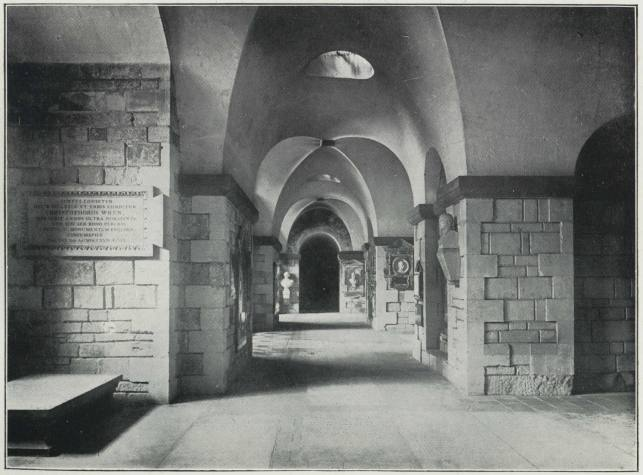
Crypt of St. Paul's Cathedral, Wren's memorial on the left

The Wren family estate was at The Old Court House in the area of Hampton Court. He had been given a lease on the property by Queen Anne in lieu of salary arrears for building St Paul's. For convenience Wren also leased a house on St James's Street in London. According to a 19th-century legend, he would often go to London to pay unofficial visits to St Paul's, to check on the progress of "my greatest work". On one of these trips to London, at the age of ninety, he caught a cold and on 25 February 1723 a servant who tried to awaken Wren from his nap found that he had died in his sleep.

Wren was laid to rest on 5 March 1723. His body was placed in the southeast corner of the crypt of St Paul's. There is a memorial to him in the crypt at St Paul's Cathedral. beside those of his daughter Jane, his sister Susan Holder, and her husband William. The plain stone plaque was written by Wren's eldest son and heir, Christopher Wren the Younger The inscription, which is also inscribed in a circle of black marble on the main floor beneath the centre of the dome, reads:

SUBTUS CONDITUR HUIUS ECCLESIÆ ET VRBIS CONDITOR CHRISTOPHORUS WREN, QUI VIXIT ANNOS ULTRA NONAGINTA, NON SIBI SED BONO PUBLICO. LECTOR SI MONUMENTUM REQUIRIS CIRCUMSPICE Obijt XXV Feb: An°: MDCCXXIII Æt: XCI.

which translates from Latin as:

Here in its foundations lies the architect of this church and city, Christopher Wren, who lived beyond ninety years, not for his own profit but for the public good. Reader, if you seek his monument – look around you. Died 25 Feb. 1723, age 91.

His obituary was published in the Post Boy No. 5244 London 2 March 1723:

Sir Christopher Wren who died on Monday last in the 91st year of his age, was the only son of Dr. Chr. Wren, Dean of Windsor & Wolverhampton, Registar of the Garter, younger brother of Dr. Mathew (sic) Wren Ld Bp of Ely, a branch of the ancient family of Wrens of Binchester in the Bishoprick [sic] of Durham
1653. Elected from Wadham into fellowship of All Souls
1657. Professor of Astronomy Gresham College London
1660. Savilian Professor. Oxford
After 1666. Surveyor General for Rebuilding the Cathedral Church of St.Paul and the Parochial Churches & all other Public Buildings which he lived to finish
1669. Surveyor General till April 26. 1718
1680. President of the Royal Society
1698. Surveyor General & Sub Commissioner for Repairs to Westminster Abbey by Act of Parliament, continued till death.
His body is to be deposited in the Great Vault under the Dome of the Cathedral of St. Paul.

"The Curious and Entire Libraries of Sir Christopher Wren", and of his son, were auctioned by Langford and Cock at Mr Cock's in Covent Garden on 24–27 October 1748.

== Scientific career ==
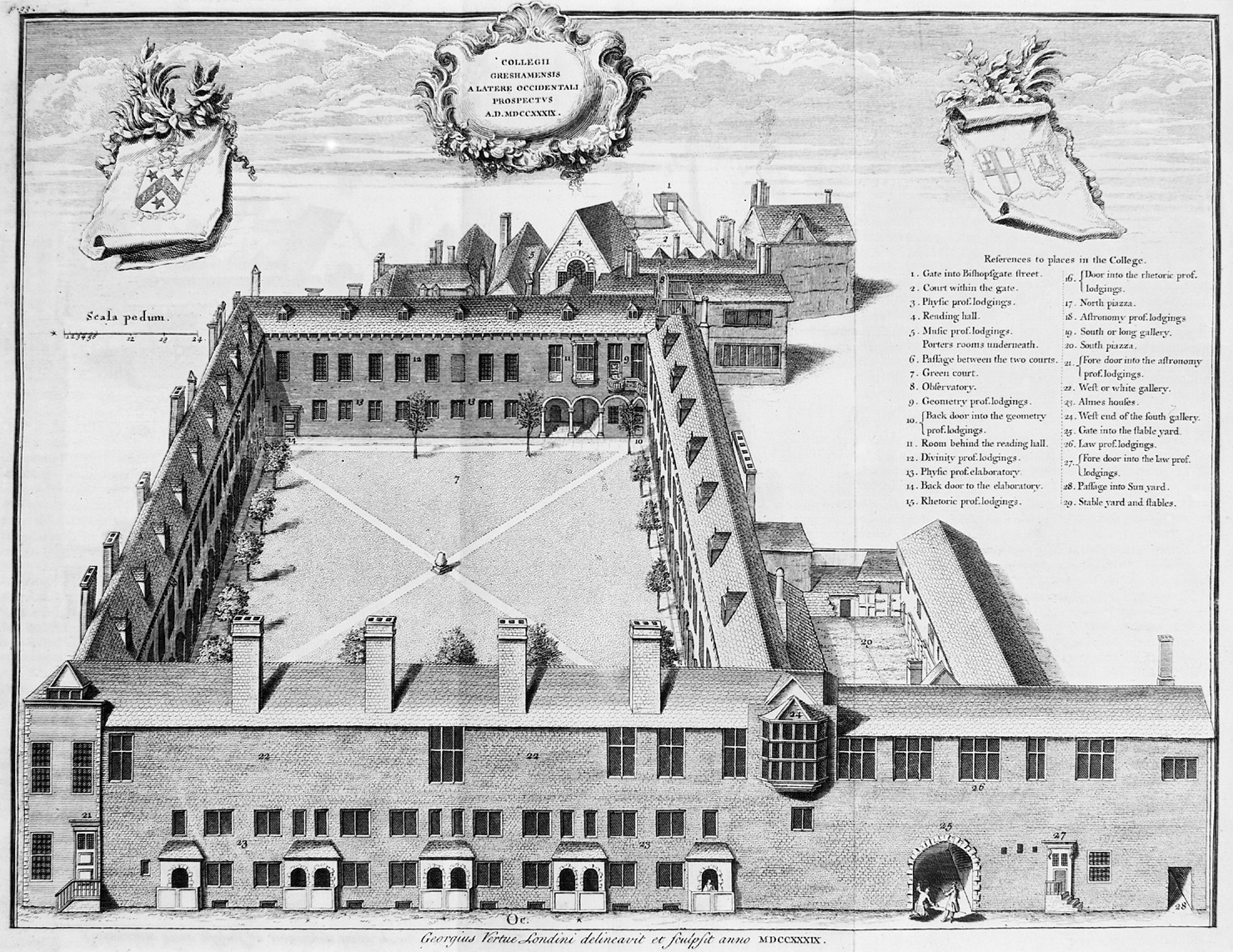
Wren spent a portion of his scientific career at Gresham College

One of Wren's friends, Robert Hooke, scientist and architect and a fellow Westminster Schoolboy, said of him "Since the time of Archimedes there scarce ever met in one man in so great perfection such a mechanical hand and so philosophical mind."

When a fellow of All Souls, Wren constructed a transparent beehive for scientific observation; he began observing the Moon, which was to lead to the invention of micrometers for the telescope. According to Parentalia (pp. 210–211), his solid model of the Moon attracted the attention of the King who commanded Wren to perfect it and present it to him.

He contrived an artificial Eye, truly and dioptrically made (as large as a Tennis-Ball) representing the Picture as Nature makes it: The Cornea, and Crystalline were Glass, the other Humours, Water.

— Parentalia, p. 209

He experimented on terrestrial magnetism and had taken part in medical experiments while at Wadham College, performing the first successful injection of a substance into the bloodstream (of a dog). In Gresham College, he did experiments involving determining longitude through magnetic variation and through lunar observation to help with navigation, and helped construct a 35-foot (11 m) telescope with Sir Paul Neile. Wren also studied and improved the microscope and telescope at this time. He had also been making observations of the planet Saturn from around 1652 with the aim of explaining its appearance. His hypothesis was written up in De corpore saturni but before the work was published, Huygens presented his theory of the rings of Saturn. Immediately Wren recognised this as a better hypothesis than his own and De corpore saturni was never published. In addition, he constructed an exquisitely detailed lunar model and presented it to the king. In 1658, he found the length of an arc of the cycloid using an exhaustion proof based on dissections to reduce the problem to summing segments of chords of a circle which are in geometric progression.

A year into Wren's appointment as a Savilian Professor in Oxford, the Royal Society was created and Wren became an active member. As Savilian Professor, Wren studied mechanics thoroughly, especially elastic collisions and pendulum motions. He also directed his far-ranging intelligence to the study of meteorology: in 1662, he invented the tipping bucket rain gauge and, in 1663, designed a "weather-clock" that would record temperature, humidity, rainfall and barometric pressure. A working weather clock based on Wren's design was completed by Robert Hooke in 1679.

In addition, Wren experimented on muscle functionality, hypothesizing that the swelling and shrinking of muscles might proceed from a fermentative motion arising from the mixture of two heterogeneous fluids. Although this is incorrect, it was at least founded upon observation and may mark a new outlook on medicine: specialisation.

Another topic to which Wren contributed was optics. He published a description of an engine to create perspective drawings and he discussed the grinding of conical lenses and mirrors. Out of this work came another of Wren's important mathematical results, namely that the hyperboloid of revolution is a ruled surface. These results were published in 1669. In subsequent years, Wren continued with his work with the Royal Society, although after the 1680s his scientific interests seem to have waned: no doubt his architectural and official duties absorbed more time.

It was a problem posed by Wren that serves as an ultimate source to the conception of Newton's Principia Mathematica Philosophiae Naturalis. Robert Hooke had theorised that planets, moving in vacuo, describe orbits around the Sun because of a rectilinear inertial motion by the tangent and an accelerated motion towards the Sun. Wren's challenge to Halley and Hooke, for the reward of a book worth thirty shillings, was to provide, within the context of Hooke's hypothesis, a mathematical theory linking Kepler's laws with a specific force law. Halley took the problem to Newton for advice, prompting the latter to write a nine-page answer, De motu corporum in gyrum, which was later to be expanded into the Principia.

Mentioned above are only a few of Wren's scientific works. He also studied other areas, ranging from agriculture, ballistics, water and freezing, light and refraction, to name only a few. Thomas Birch's History of the Royal Society (1756–57) is one of the most important sources of our knowledge not only of the Society's origins, but also its day-to-day running. It is in these records that most of Wren's known scientific works are recorded.

== Architectural career ==
Wren was a prominent man of science at the height of the Scientific Revolution. The Scientific Revolution seemed to promise a merger of the science of mechanics and the art of building. In Galileo Galilei's Two New Sciences the first science is not dynamics, for which the book is now better known, but rather the strength of materials, which Galileo had recognized 30 years earlier as a "science that is very necessary in making machines and buildings of all kinds." In 1624 Henry Wotton, the British ambassador to Venice, published a book on architecture in which he analyzed in a rudimentary way the structure of a stone arch. Moreover, in the 17th century, it was people who would now be called scientists who were awarded the commissions to design and build monumental structures. In Turin, Guarino Guarini, a mathematician, devised the plans for such celebrated buildings as the Royal Church of Saint Lawrence, the Chapel of the Holy Shroud and the Palazzo Carignano. In Paris, Claude Perrault, a physician and an anatomist, designed the façade of the Louvre and the observatory of the Académie Française. In London, it was Wren and Hooke who collaborated as chief architect and city surveyor after the city was devastated by the Great Fire of 1666.

In 1661, just months after taking his post at Oxford, Wren was invited by Charles II to oversee the construction of new harbour defences at Tangier—then-newly under British control. Wren ultimately excused himself from the King's offer. Letters dated to the end of 1661 note that in addition to the Tangier project, Charles II had also sought Wren for consultation regarding repairs to Old St Paul's Cathedral, the reconstruction of which would ultimately be the architect's magnum opus. Speaking of Wren's vocational transition from academic to architect-engineer, biographer Adrian Tinniswood writes "the use of mathematicians in military fortification was not unusual... Perhaps Wren also had experience of the business of fortification, more than we know."

=== Early architectural work ===
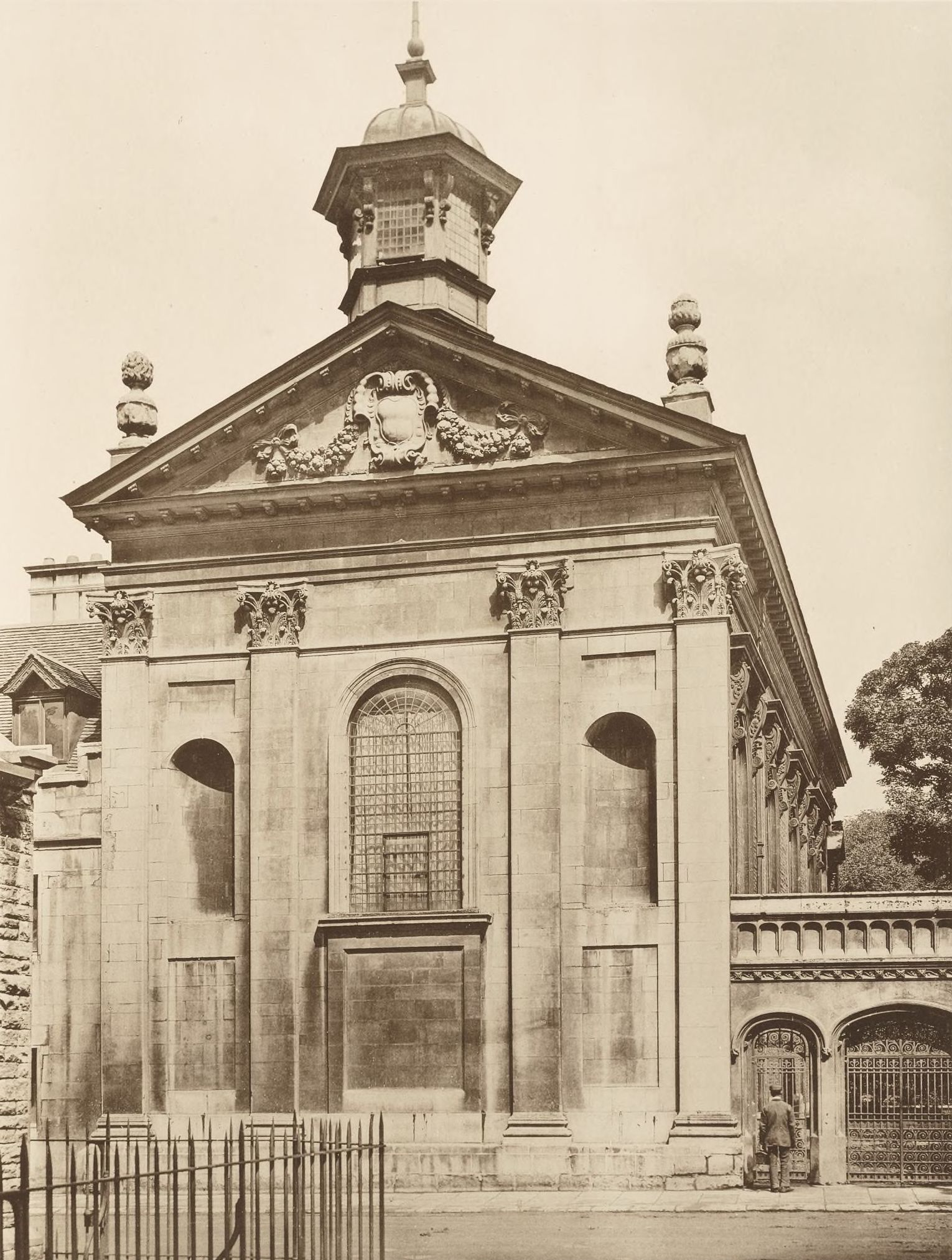
Pembroke Chapel

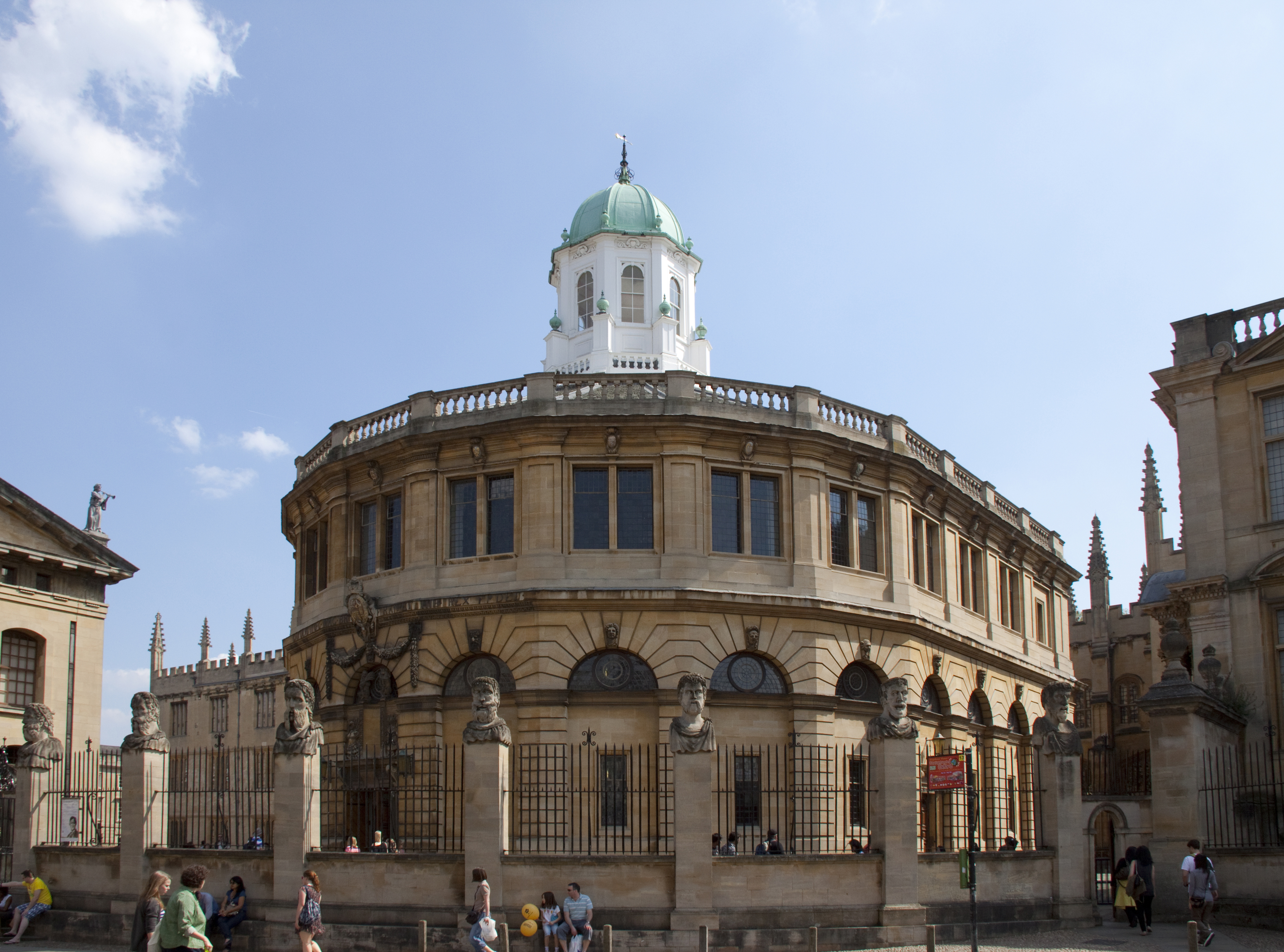
Sheldonian Theatre

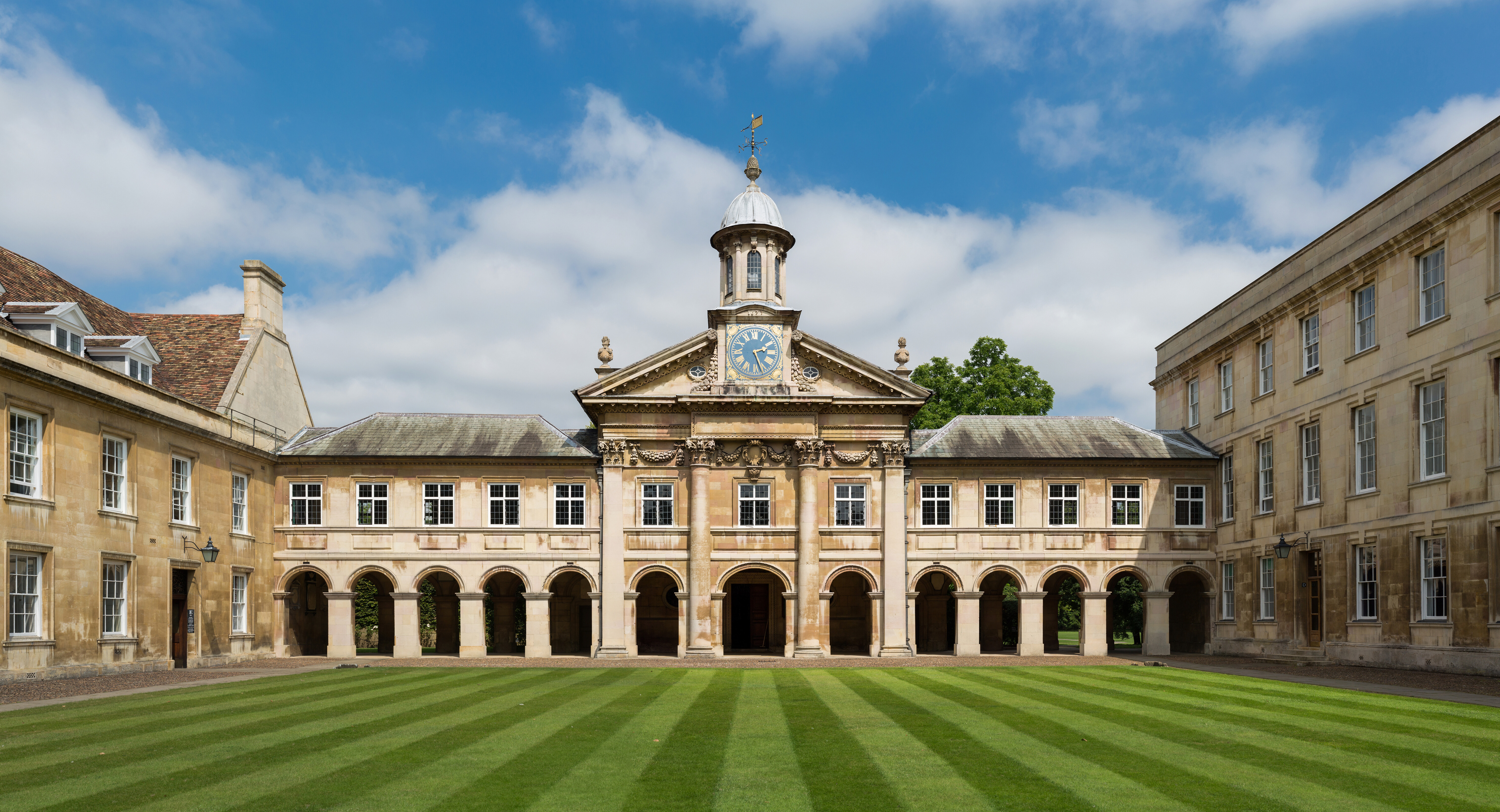
Emmanuel College Chapel

Wren's first known foray into architecture came after his uncle, Matthew Wren, Bishop of Ely, offered to finance a new chapel for Pembroke College, Cambridge. Matthew commissioned his nephew for the design, finding the architecturally inexperienced Christopher to be both ideologically sympathetic and stylistically deferential. Wren produced his design in the Winter of 1662 or 1663 and the chapel was completed in 1665.

Wren's second, similarly collegiate work followed soon after, when he was commissioned to design Oxford's "New Theatre", financed by Gilbert Sheldon. His design for the structure was met with lukewarm to negative reception, with even Wren's defenders admitting the young architect to have not yet been "capable of handling a large architectural composition with assurance". Adrian Tinniswood credits the building's flaws to "Sheldon's refusal to pay for an elaborate exterior, Wren's inability to find an adequate external expression for a building which was wholly conditioned by the functionality of its interior space and, ...his refusal to bend the knee to classical authority in the way that our experience of eighteenth-century architecture has conditioned us to believe is right." Prior to the theatre's 1669 completion, Wren had received further commissions for the Garden Quadrangle at Trinity College, Oxford, and the chapel of Emmanuel College, Cambridge.

Wren left for Paris in July 1665 on his first and only trip abroad. In France, the architect encountered an architectural milieu more closely linked to the ideals of the Italian Renaissance. Wren also met Gian Lorenzo Bernini, who was "widely acknowledged by contemporaries as the greatest artist of the century". Though Bernini's concrete influence on Wren's designs was transmitted via published plans and engravings, the encounter surely impacted the budding architect and his vocational trajectory.

=== St Paul's Cathedral ===
St Paul's Cathedral in London has always been the highlight of Wren's reputation. His association with it spans his whole architectural career, including the 36 years between the start of the new building and the declaration by parliament of its completion in 1711. Letters document Wren's involvement in St Paul as early as 1661, when he was consulted by Charles II regarding repairs to the medieval structure. In the spring of 1666, he made his first design for a dome for St Paul's. It was accepted in principle on 27 August 1666. One week later, however, the Great Fire of London reduced two-thirds of the City to a smoking desert and old St Paul's to ruin. Wren was most likely at Oxford at the time, but the news, so fantastically relevant to his future, drew him at once to London. Between 5 and 11 September, he ascertained the precise area of devastation, worked out a plan for rebuilding the City and submitted it to Charles II. Others also submitted plans. However, no new plan proceeded any further than the paper on which it was drawn. A Rebuilding of London Act which provided rebuilding of some essential buildings was passed in 1666. In 1669, the King's Surveyor of Works died and Wren was promptly installed.

The development of Wren's design for St Paul's Cathedral

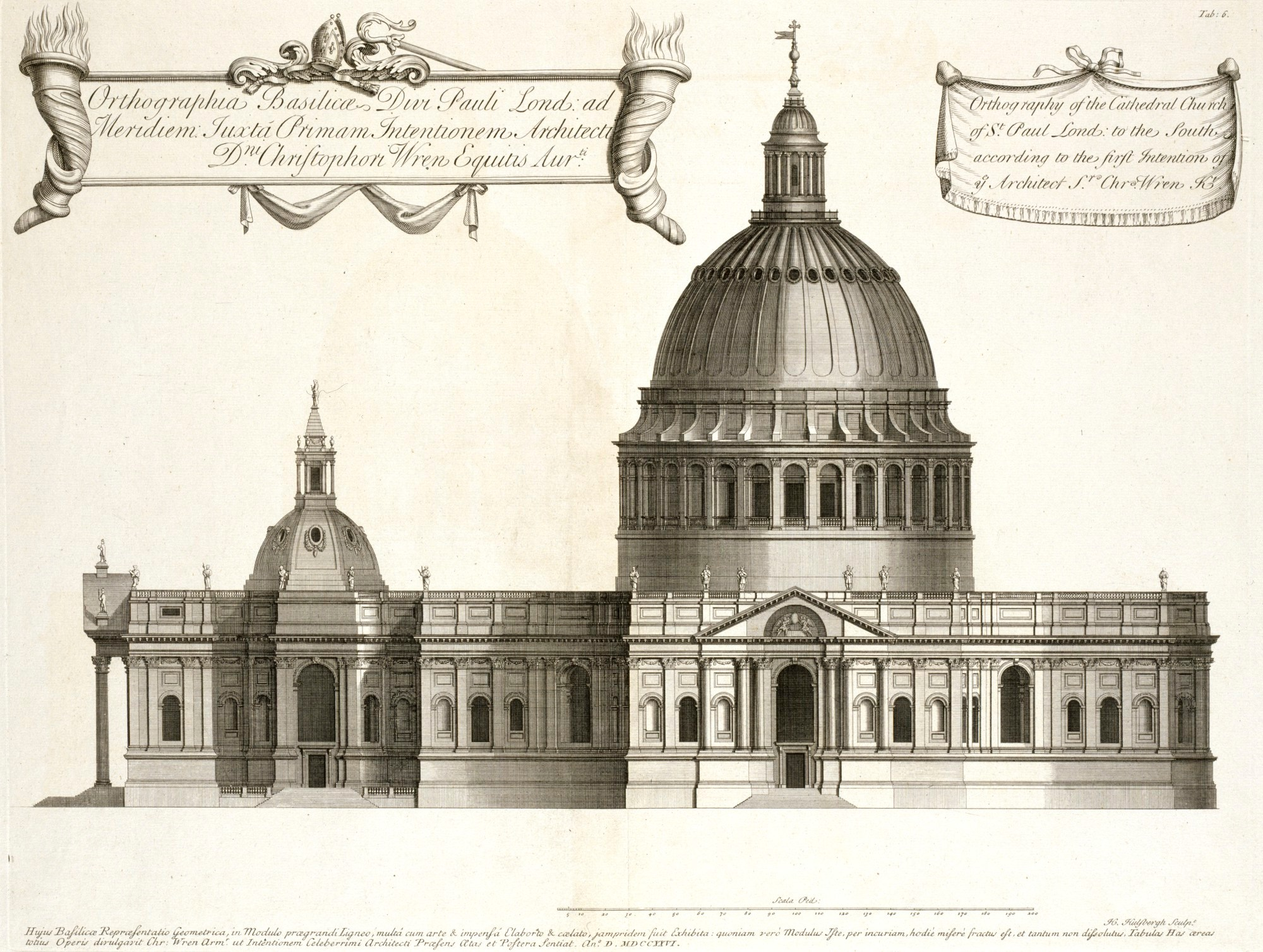
Greek Cross Design (1673)

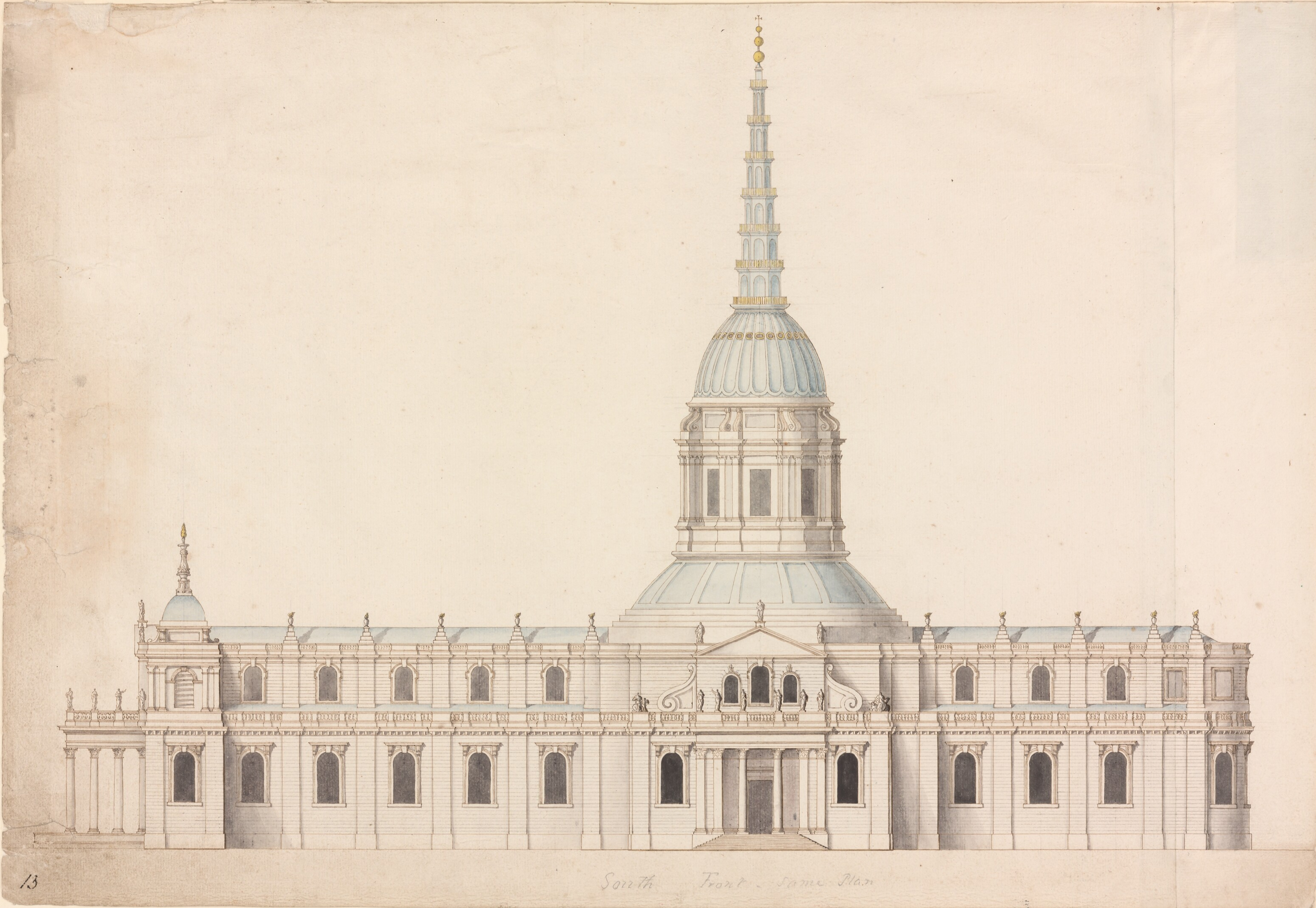
The Warrant Design (1674)

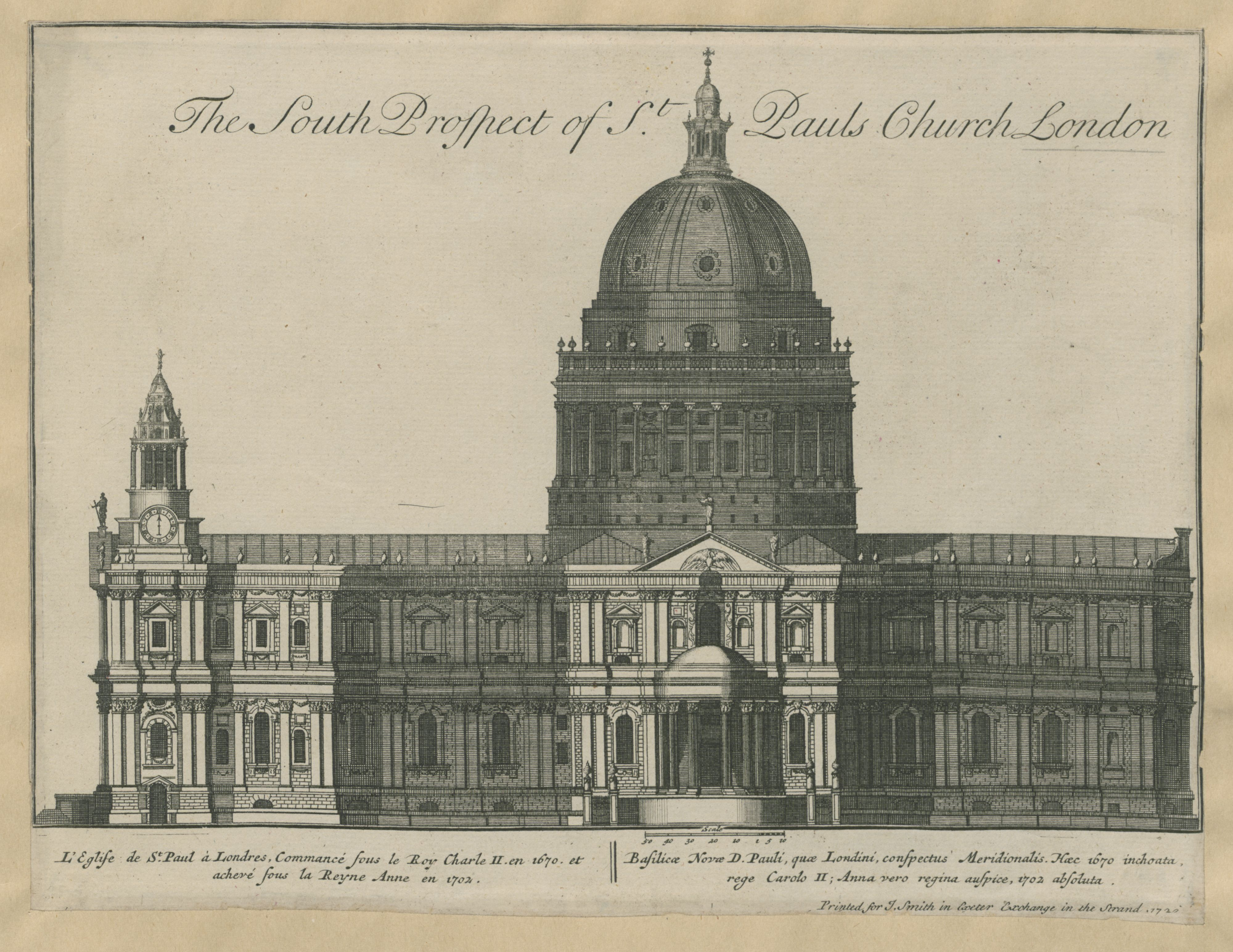
The cathedral as built

It was not until 1670 that the pace of rebuilding started accelerating. A second rebuilding act was passed that year, raising the tax on coal and thus providing a source of funds for rebuilding of churches destroyed within the City of London. Wren presented his initial "First Model" for St Paul's. This plan was accepted, and demolition of the old cathedral began. By 1672, however, this design seemed too modest, and Wren met his critics by producing a design of spectacular grandeur. This modified design, called "Great Model", was accepted by the King and the construction started in November 1673. However, this design failed to satisfy the chapter and clerical opinion generally; moreover, it had an economic drawback. Wren was confined to a "cathedral form" desired by the clergy. In 1674 he produced the rather meagre Classical-Gothic compromise known as the Warrant Design. However, this design, called so from the royal warrant of 14 May 1675 attached to the drawings, is not the design upon which work had begun a few weeks before.

St Paul's Cathedral

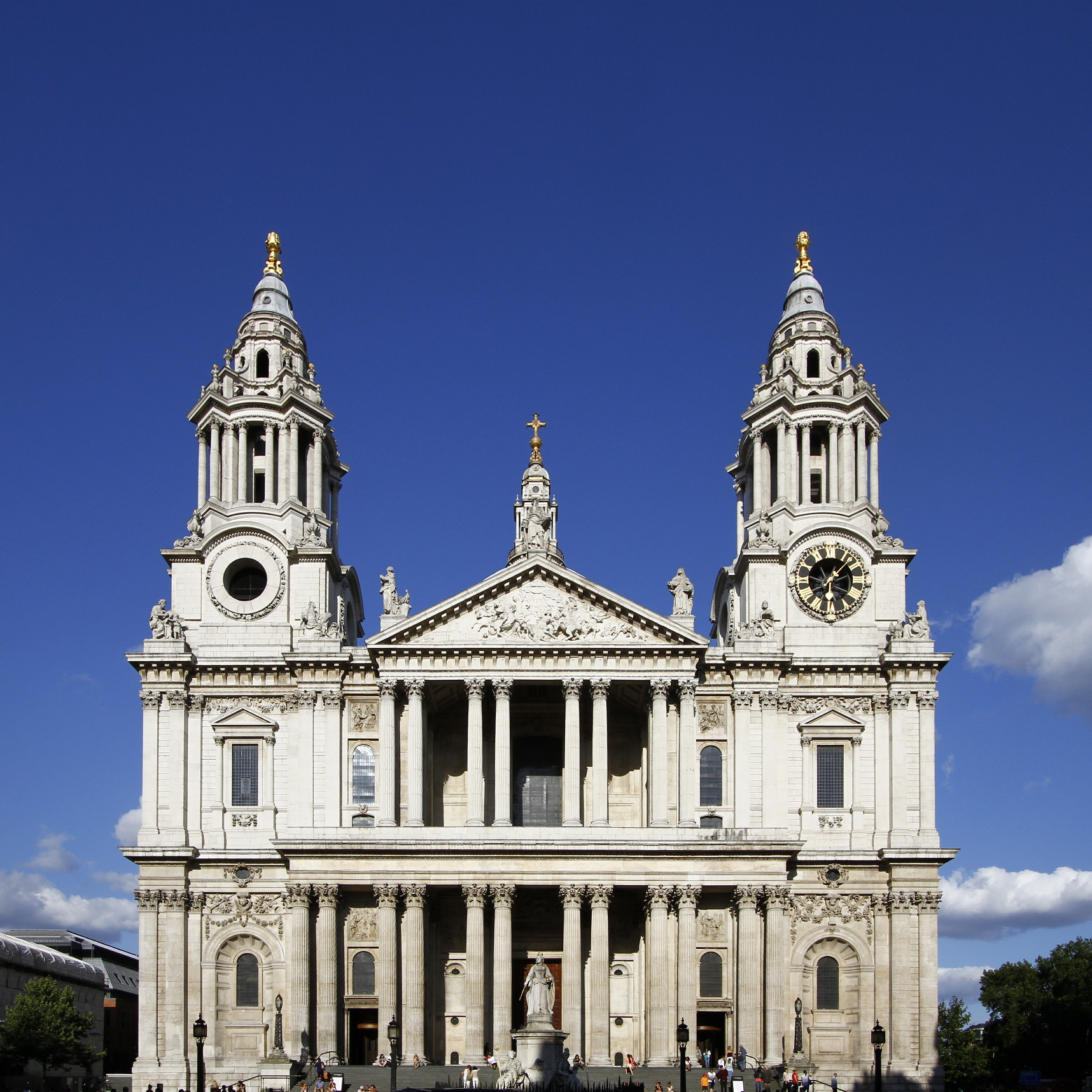
West front

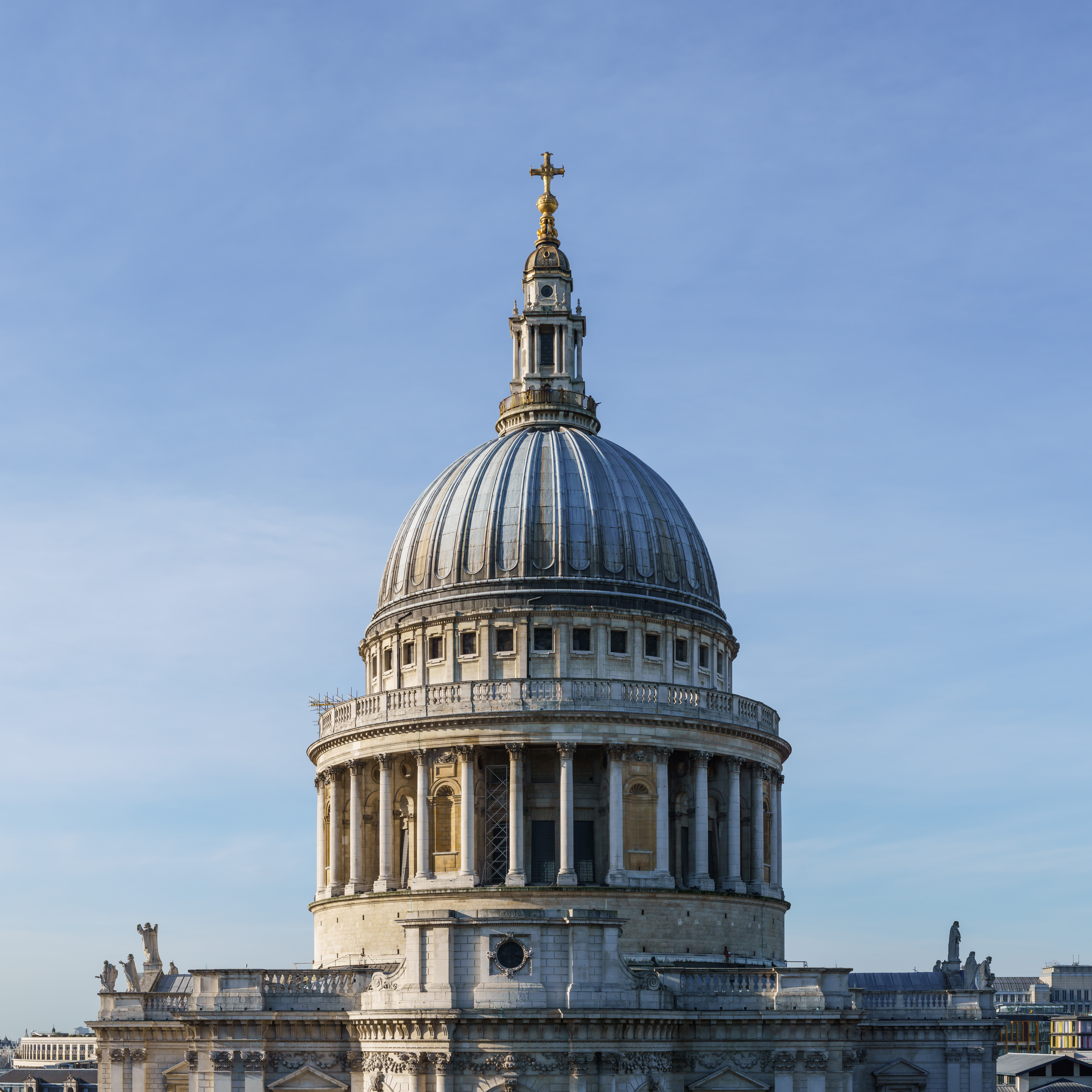
Dome

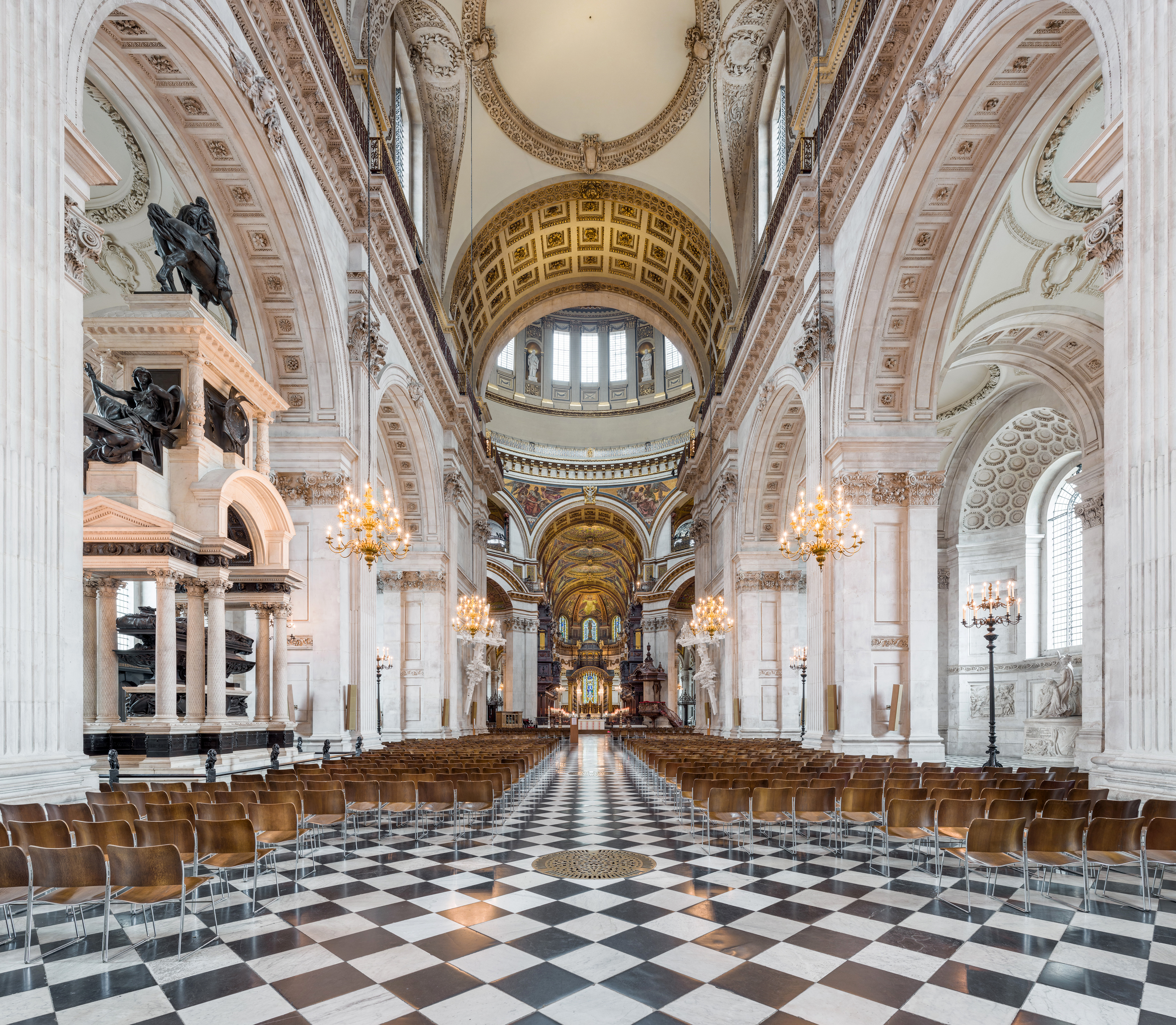
Nave

The cathedral that Wren started to build bears only a slight resemblance to the Warrant Design. In 1697, the first service was held in the cathedral when Wren was 65. There was still, however, no dome. Finally, in 1711 the cathedral was declared complete, and Wren was paid the half of his salary that, in the hope of accelerating progress, Parliament had withheld for 14 years since 1697. The cathedral had been built for 36 years under his direction, and the only disappointment he had about his masterpiece was the dome: against his wishes, the commission engaged Thornhill to paint the inner dome in false perspective and finally authorised a balustrade around the roof line. This diluted the hard edge Wren had intended for his cathedral, and elicited the parthian comment that "ladies think nothing well without an edging".

=== Later career ===
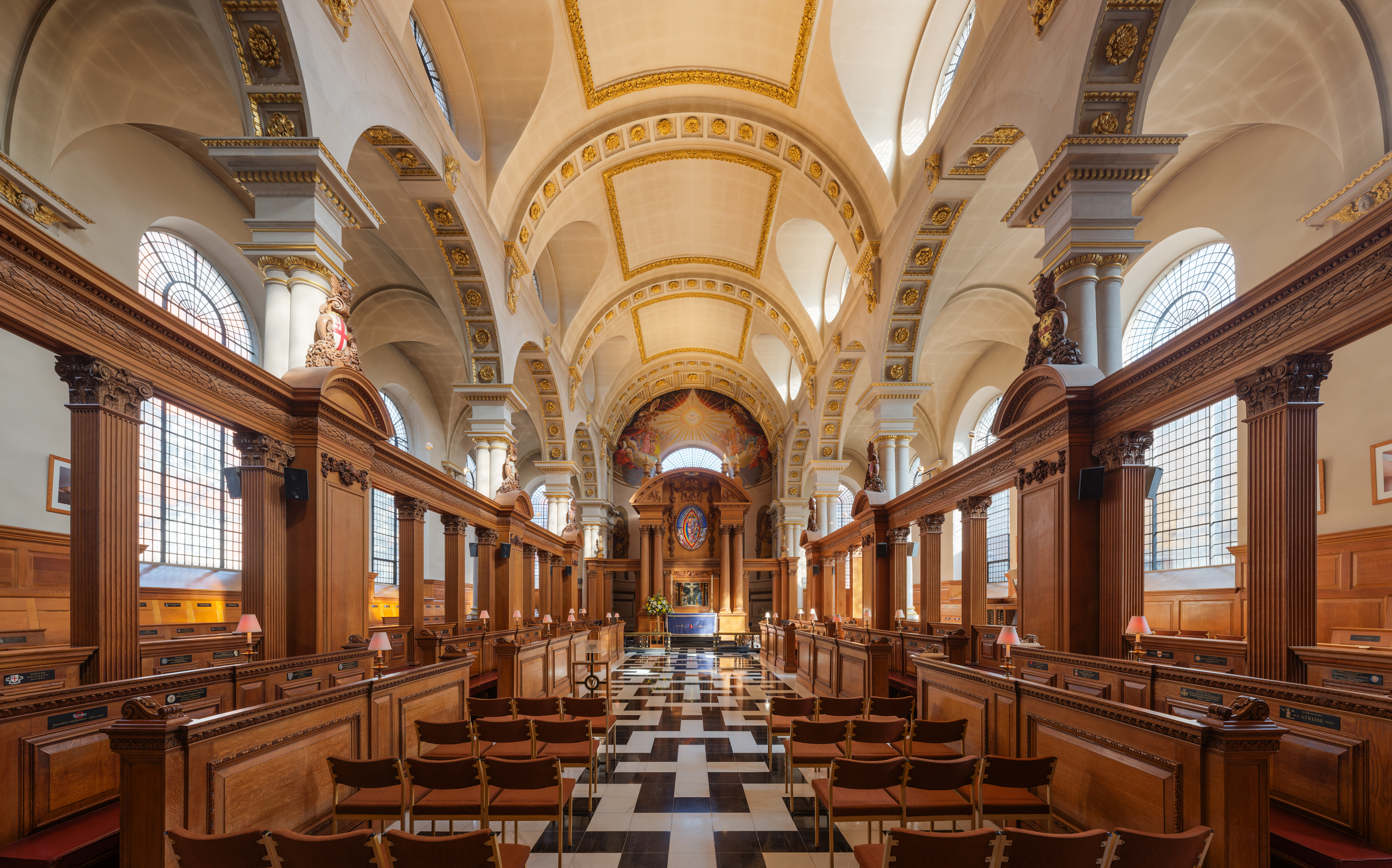
St Bride's Church (1670–84)

During the 1670s, Christopher Wren received significant secular commissions. Among many of his notable designs at this time, the monument (1671–76) commemorating the Great Fire also involved Robert Hooke, but Wren was in control of the final design, the Royal Observatory (1675–76), and the Wren Library at Trinity College, Cambridge (1676–84) were the most important ones.

In 1682, Wren advised that the original statues of the King's Beasts on St George's Chapel, Windsor be removed. The pinnacles were left bare until 1925, when replica statues were installed.

By historical accident, all Wren's large-scale secular commissions dated from after the 1680s. His first large project, the Chelsea Hospital (1682–92), does not entirely satisfy the eye in its proportions, but met its brief with distinction and such success that it still fulfils its original function. The reconstruction of the state rooms at Windsor Castle was notable for the integration of architecture, sculpture and painting. This commission was in the hand of Hugh May, who died in February 1684, before the construction finished; Wren assumed his post and finalised the works.

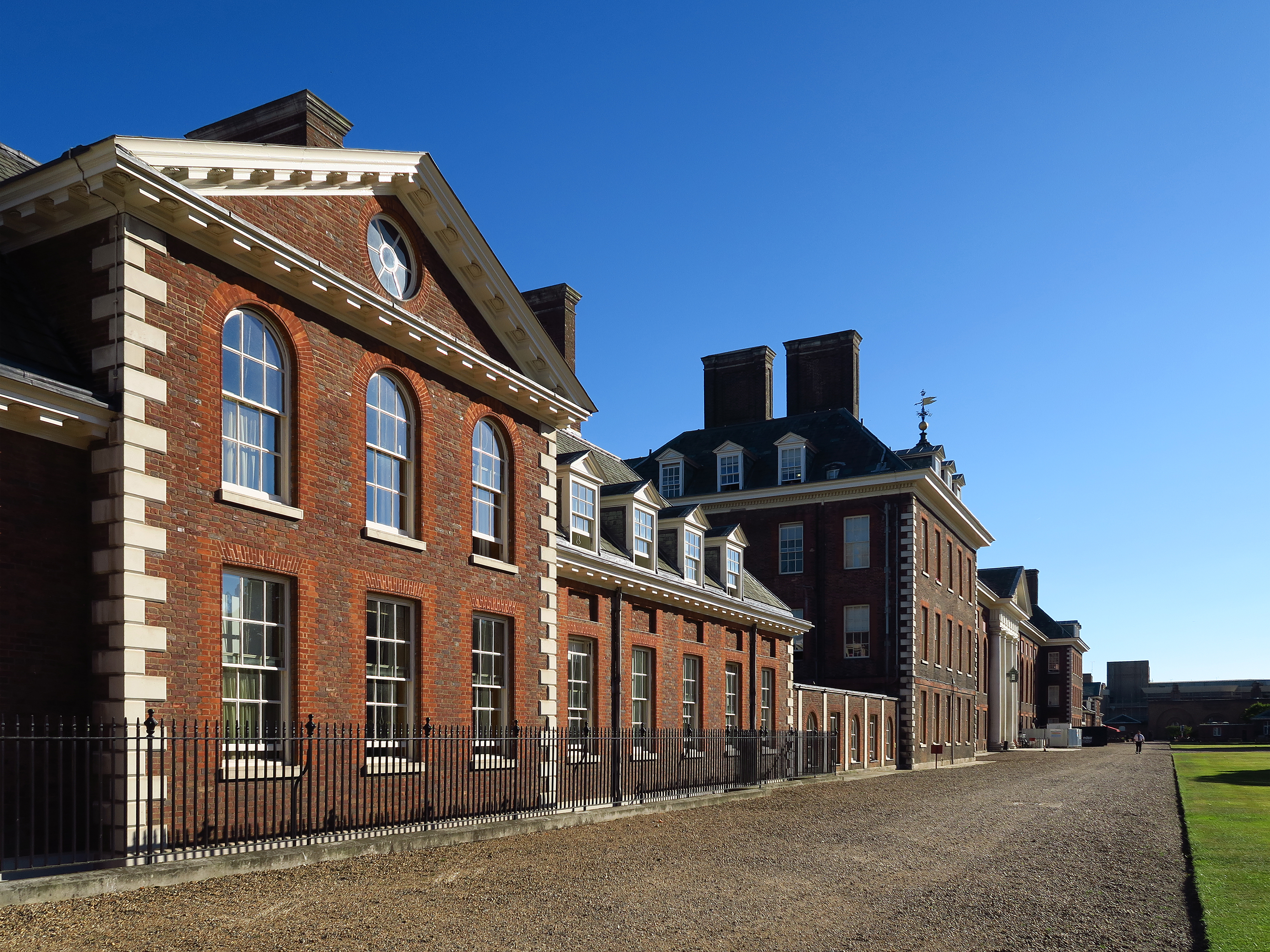
Royal Hospital Chelsea (1682–92)

Between 1683 and 1685 he was much occupied in designing the King's House, Winchester, where Charles II had hoped to spend his declining years, but which was never completed. When Wren promised that it would be complete within a year the King, who was conscious of his mortality, replied that " a year is a great time in my life".

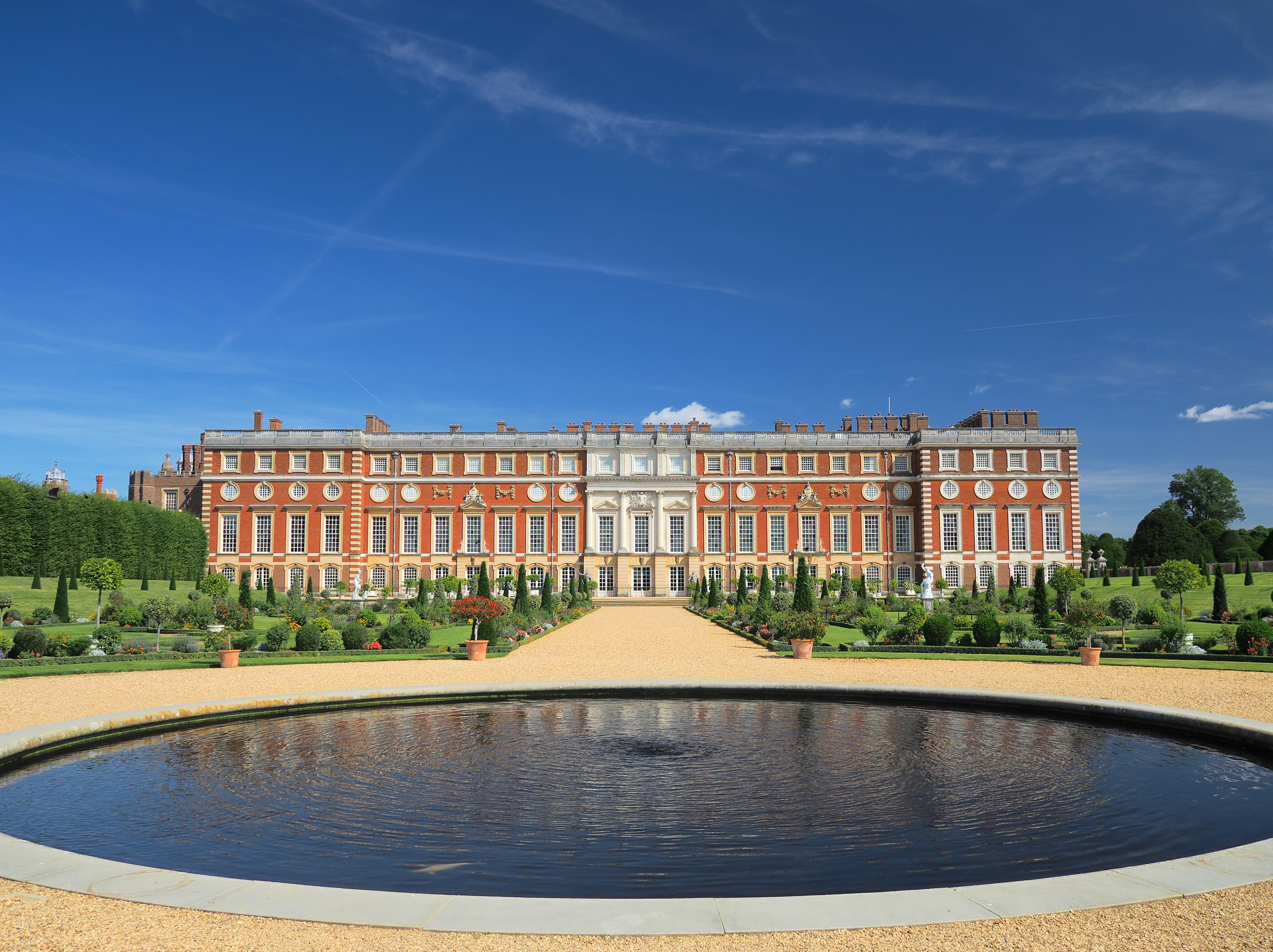
Hampton Court (1689–1702)

After the death of Charles II in 1685, Wren's attention was directed mainly to Whitehall (1685–87). The new king, James II, required a new chapel and also ordered a new gallery, council chamber and a riverside apartment for the Queen. Later, when James II was removed from the throne, Wren took on architectural projects such as Kensington Palace (1689–96) and Hampton Court (1689–1700).

The erection of the present Windsor Guildhall was begun in 1687, under the direction of Sir Thomas Fitz (or Fiddes) but there is a story that on his death in 1689, the task was taken over by Wren. It was completed at a cost of £2687 – 1s – 6d. However, there is little evidence that Wren was ever involved in the design or construction of the Guildhall. It is now believed that the story grew out of Wren's connections with Windsor and that his son, also called Christopher Wren, who served as a Member of Parliament for Windsor, commissioned the statue of Prince George of Denmark in 1713 on the south end of the building and his name was engraved underneath.

Wren did not pursue his work on architectural design as actively as he had before the 1690s, although he still played important roles in a number of royal commissions. In 1696 he was appointed Surveyor of Greenwich Naval Hospital, and in 1698 he was appointed Surveyor of Westminster Abbey. He resigned from the former role in 1716 but held the latter until his death, approving with a wavering signature Burlington's revisions of Wren's own earlier designs for the great Archway of Westminster School.

=== Opinions on Gothic architecture ===
In the course of his works at Old St Paul's, Ely Cathedral and elsewhere, Wren had occasion to closely study some of the great monuments of Gothic architecture. From this, he was one of the first to challenge the commonly held Renaissance belief, first espoused by Giorgio Vasari, that Gothic architecture was invented by the barbarian Goths, who destroyed Rome. Wren disliked this term, preferring the label "Saracenic", as he held that the style had been adapted from the refined Islamic architecture after the Crusades. He mentioned Europe's architectural debt to the Saracens no fewer than twelve times in his writings. In his report on the fabric at Old St Paul's, he wrote:

This we now call the Gothic manner of architecture (so the Italians called what was not after the Roman style) though the Goths were rather destroyers than builders; I think it should with more reason be called the Saracen style, for these people wanted neither arts nor learning: and after we in the west lost both, we borrowed again from them, out of their Arabic books, what they with great diligence had translated from the Greeks.

— Christopher Wren, Report on St Paul's

Wren's theory of the Gothic style originating from the Crusades has since been challenged, as pointed arches existed in the West prior to the First Crusade of 1095, while the Gothic style did not properly develop until several generations after the First Crusade, but his speculation was an important step towards understanding, rather than simply denigrating, the Gothic.

He also decidedly broke with tradition in his assumption that Gothic architecture did not merely represent a violent and bothersome mistake (as Vasari had suggested). Rather, Wren saw that the Gothic style had developed over time along the lines of a changing society, and that it was thus a legitimate architectural style in its own right. He also saw the "Saracenic" pointed arch as structurally superior than the "Roman" rounded arch, as it more closely approximates the parabola, discovered by Newton to be the most efficient shape for an arch. Nonetheless, Wren strongly disliked the building practices of the Gothic style. When he was appointed Surveyor of the Fabric at Westminster Abbey in the year 1698, he expressed his distaste for the Gothic style in a letter to the Bishop of Rochester:

Nothing was thought magnificent that was not high beyond Measure, with the Flutter of Arch-buttresses, so we call the sloping Arches that poise the higher Vaultings of the Nave. The Romans always concealed their Butments, whereas the Normans thought them ornamental. These I have observed are the first Things that occasion the Ruin of Cathedrals, being so much exposed to the Air and Weather; the Coping, which cannot defend them, first failing, and if they give Way, the Vault must spread. Pinnacles are no Use, and as little Ornament.

— Christopher Wren, Parentalia

== Freemasonry ==
Since at least the 18th century, the Lodge of Antiquity No. 2, one of the four founding Masonic Lodges of the Premier Grand Lodge of England in 1717, has claimed Christopher Wren to have been its Master at the Goose and Gridiron at St. Paul's churchyard. Whilst he was rebuilding the cathedral he is said to have been "adopted" on 18 May 1691 (that is, accepted as a sort of honorary member or patron, rather than an operative). Their 18th-century maul with its 1827 inscription claiming that it was used by Wren for the foundation stone of St. Paul's, belonging to the Lodge and on display in the Library and Museum of Freemasonry in London, corroborates the story. James Anderson made the claims in his widely circulated Constitutions while many of Wren's friends were still alive, but he made many highly creative claims as to the history or legends of Freemasonry. There is also a clear possibility of confusion between the operative workmen's lodges which might naturally have welcomed the boss, and the "speculative" or gentlemen's lodges which became highly fashionable just after Wren's death. By the standards of his time, a gentleman like Wren would not generally join an artisan body; however the workmen of St Paul's cathedral would naturally have sought the patronage or "interest" of their employer, and within Wren's lifetime there was a predominantly gentlemen's Lodge at the Rummer and Grapes, a mile upriver at Westminster (where Wren had been to School).

In 1788, the Lodge of Antiquity thought they were buying a portrait of Wren which now dominates Lodge Room 10, in the same building as the Museum; but it is now identified with William Talman, not Wren. Nevertheless, this recorded event and many old records attest to the fact that Antiquity thought that Wren had been its Master, at a time when it still held its minute books for the relevant years (which were lost by Preston at some date after 1778).

The evidence of whether Wren was a speculative freemason is the subject of the Prestonian Lecture of 2011, which concludes on the evidence of two obituaries and Aubrey's memoirs, with supporting materials, that he did indeed attend the closed meeting in 1691, probably of the Lodge of Antiquity, but that there is nothing to suggest that he was ever a Grand Officer as claimed by Anderson.

== Achievement and legacy ==
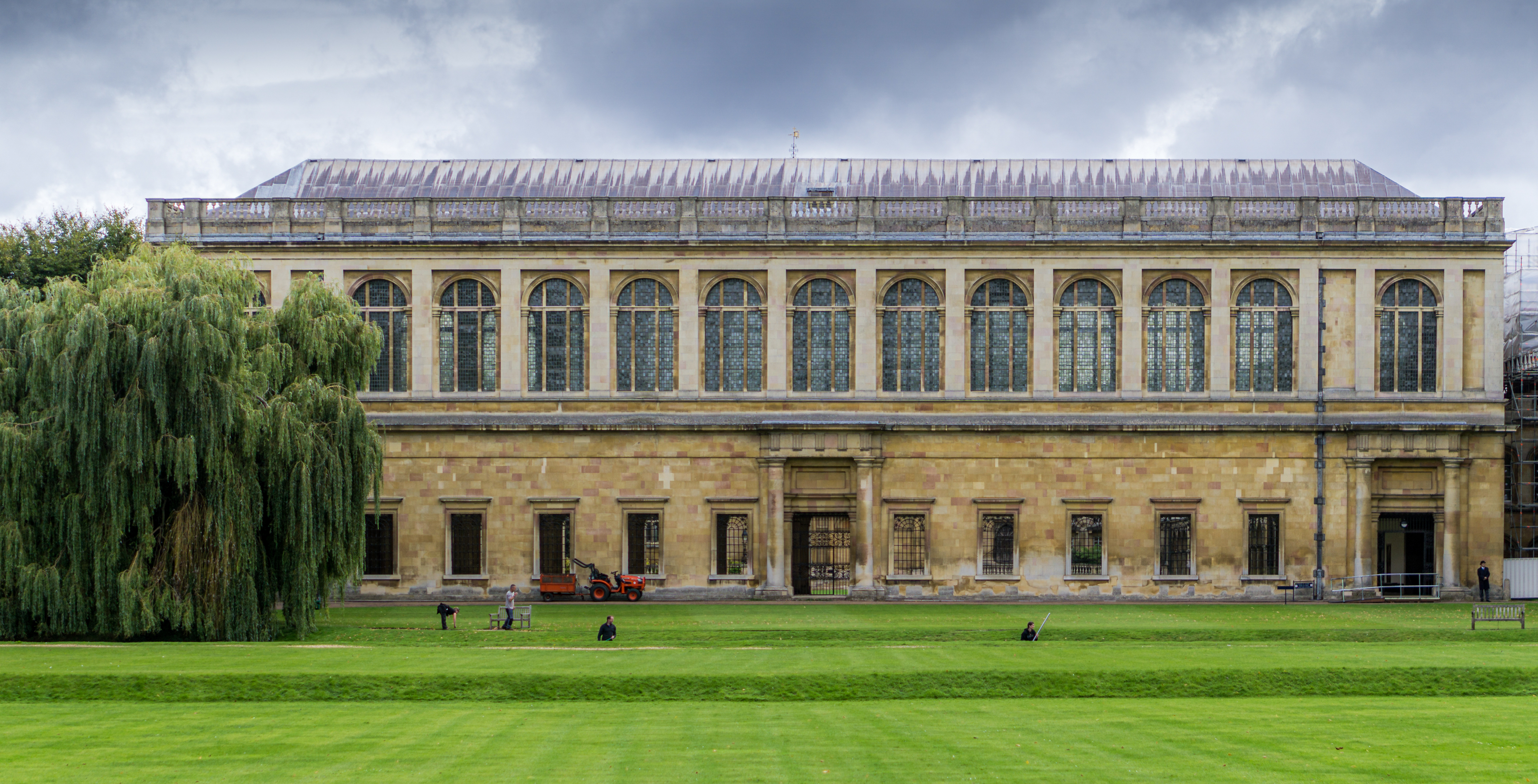
The Wren Library at Trinity College, Cambridge, is one of a number of the architect's commissions that now bear his name

Christopher Wren appeared on the reverse of the first British £50 banknote (Series D) issued in modern times. The notes were printed between 1981 and 1994, and were in circulation until 1996.

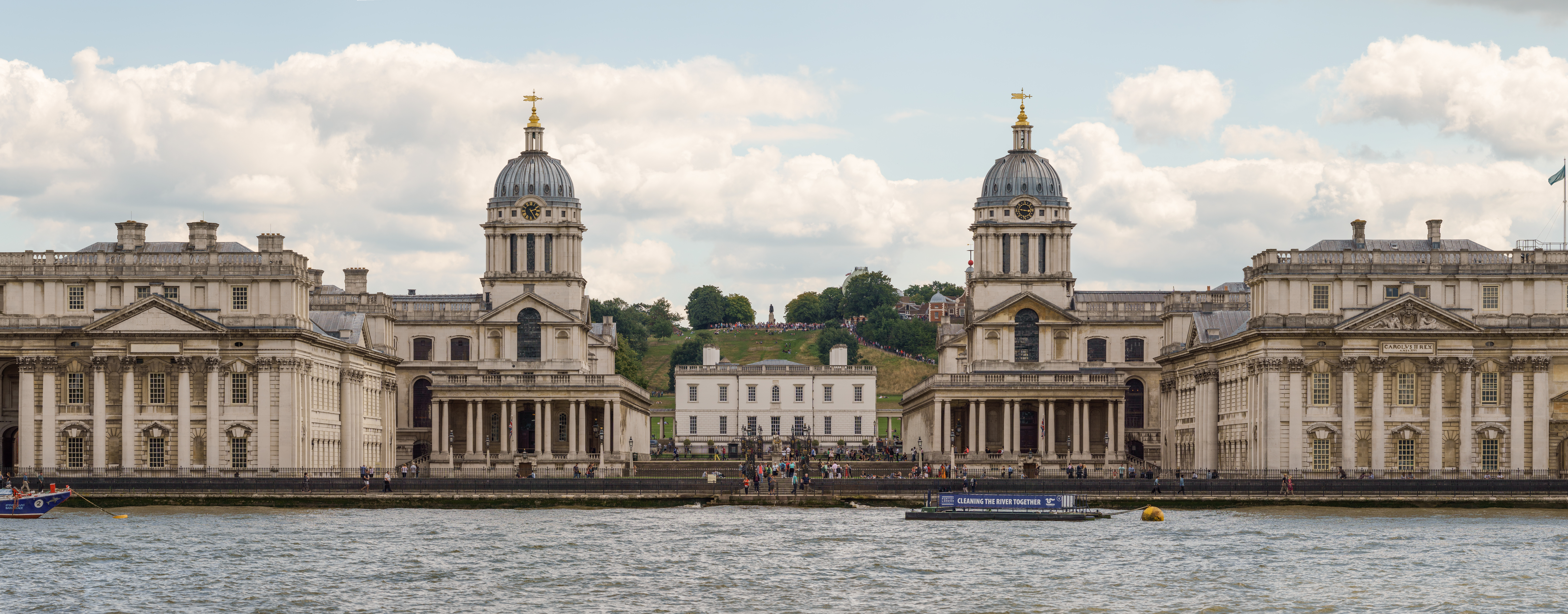
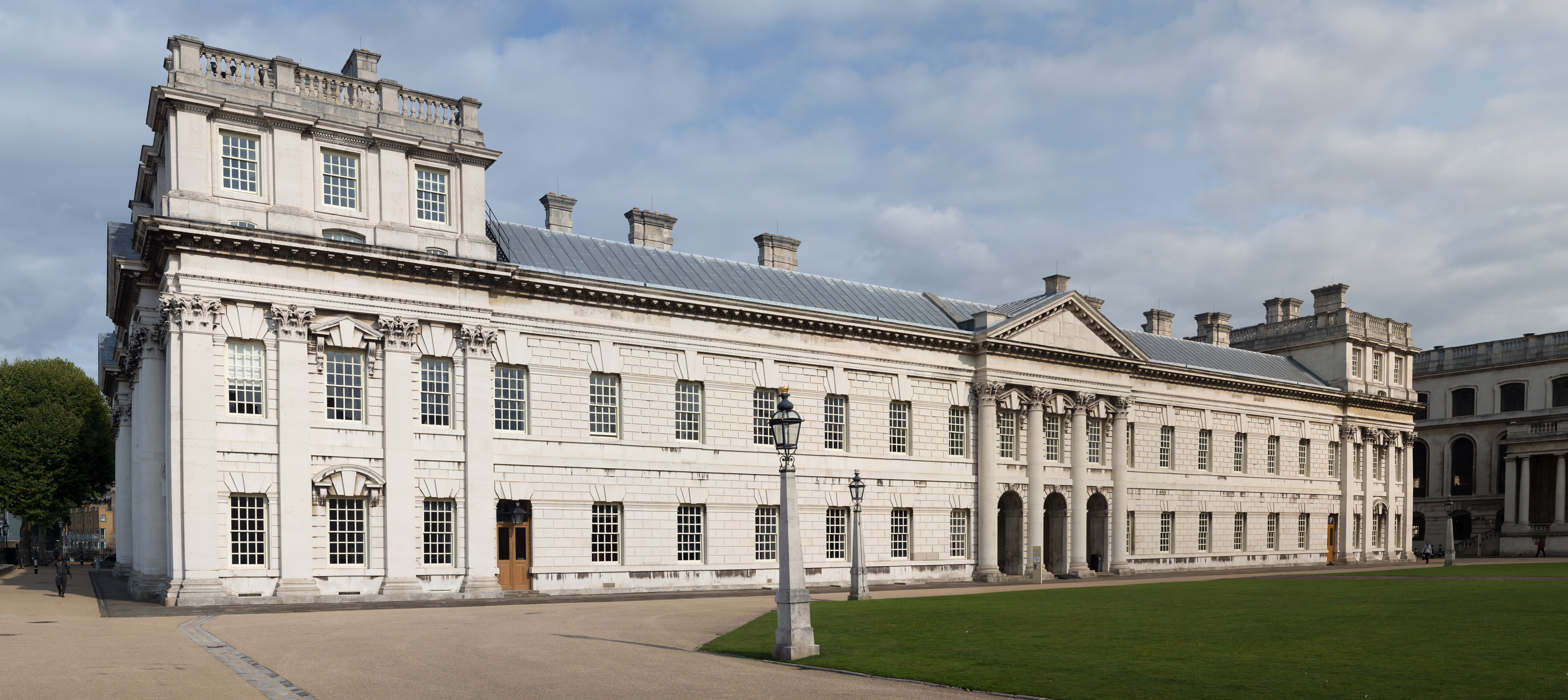
Greenwich Hospital, designed largely by Wren, is a designated World Heritage Site

In 1997, UNESCO inscribed Wren's Greenwich Hospital on the World Heritage list, citing the complex's "outstanding architectural and artistic achievements".

== In popular culture ==
Wren appears, or is mentioned in several novels and films set in the Restoration era:

- The novel Hawksmoor by Peter Ackroyd, which features a fictionalised Christopher Wren
- He also features as an important secondary character in Rosalind Laker's (Barbara Ovstedal) novel Circle of Pearls.
- He is mentioned in the 2004 film The Libertine, starring Johnny Depp, Rosamund Pike and John Malkovich.
- He is referenced in the 3rd season of Only Murders in the Building on Hulu.
- For the character created by Agatha Christie, see the play The Mousetrap

He was also credited as a set designer for one episode of the show Question Time on 21 February 2013 because the episode was filmed in St. Paul's Cathedral.

== Bibliography ==
- Wren, Christopher; Ames, Joseph; Wren, Stephen (1750). Parentalia, or, Memoirs of the family of the Wrens.

== See also ==
- List of works by Christopher Wren
- List of Christopher Wren churches in London
- Thomas Gilbert, one of Wren's apprentices and adaptant of his architectural style
- Gresham Professor of Astronomy
- List of presidents of the Royal Society

Parliament of England
Preceded by Sir George Treby; John Pollexfen	Member of Parliament for Plympton Erle; 1685–1687; With: Richard Strode	Succeeded by Sir George Treby; John Pollexfen
Preceded by William Chiffinch; Richard Graham	Member of Parliament for New Windsor; 11 January 1689 – 14 May 1689; With: Henry Powle	Succeeded by Henry Powle; Sir Algernon May
Preceded by Henry Powle; Sir Algernon May	Member of Parliament for New Windsor; 6 March 1690 – 17 May 1690; With: Baptist May	Succeeded by Sir Charles Porter; William Adderley
Preceded by The Hon. Henry Thynne; The Hon. Maurice Ashley; Michael Harvey; Charles Churchill	Member of Parliament for Weymouth and Melcombe Regis; 1701–1702; With: Charles Churchill; George St Lo; The Hon. Maurice Ashley (1701–1702); Anthony Henley (1702)	Succeeded by The Hon. Henry Thynne; Anthony Henley; Charles Churchill; George St Lo
Court offices
Preceded by Sir John Denham	Surveyor of the King's Works; 1669–1718	Succeeded by William Benson
Professional and academic associations
Preceded by Joseph Williamson	3rd President of the Royal Society; 1680–1682	Succeeded by John Hoskyns
