= Anthony Henley (1667–1711) =

English politician (1667–1711)

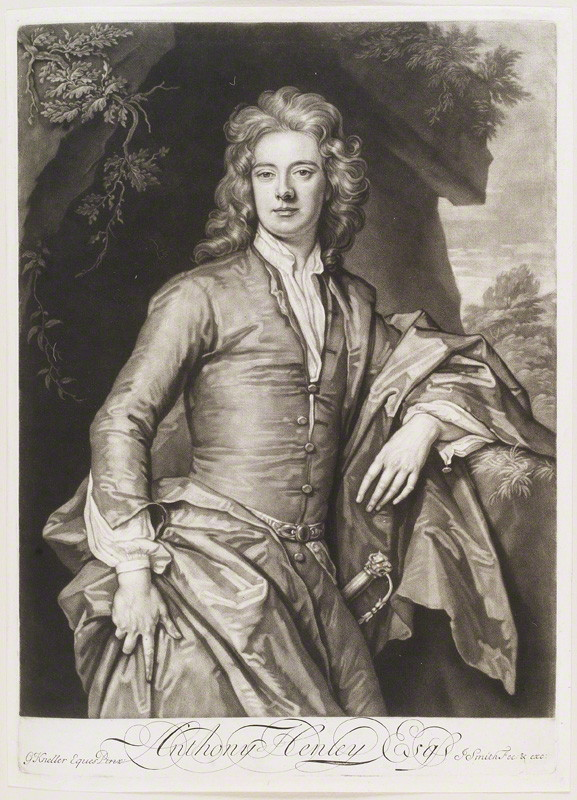
A 1694 engraving of Henley by John Smith after Godfrey Kneller

Anthony Henley (1667 – August 1711) was an English Whig politician who sat in the English and British House of Commons between 1698 and 1711. He was noted as a wit.

== Early life ==
Henley was son of Sir Robert Henley of the Grange, near Alresford, Hampshire, Member of Parliament for Andover and his second wife Barbara Hungerford, daughter of Anthony Hungerford. He matriculated at Christ Church, Oxford on 3 March 1682, aged 15 and was admitted at Middle Temple in 1684. At Oxford he studied classical literature, particularly poetry. His grandfather was the legal official Sir Robert Henley, master of the court of king's bench, on the pleas side. Out of the profits of this post Anthony inherited a fortune of more than £3,000 a year.

== Career ==
Coming to London, Henley was welcomed by the wits, and was on good terms with the Earl of Dorset and Earl of Sunderland. At the 1695 English general election he stood for Parliament at Newtown (Isle of Wight), but was defeated. This seems to have stimulated his interest in politics and by 1697 he was going to meetings of the Whig Rose Club, and later the Kit-Cat. He was returned as Member of Parliament for Andover at the 1698 English general election. He married in 1700, Mary Bertie, daughter of Peregrine Bertie and his wife Susan Monins, daughter of Sir Edward Monins of Waldershare, Kent. He gained £30,000 by his marriage. He did not stand in either of the general elections of 1701, but was returned as Whig MP for Weymouth and Melcombe Regis at the 1702 English general election. He was several times a teller for the Whigs. At the 1705 English general election he was returned again as Whig MP for Weymouth. He voted for the Court candidate for Speaker on 25 October 1705 and was again a frequent teller on behalf of the Whigs. He was returned for Weymouth again at the 1708 British general election and supported the naturalization of the Palatines in 1709. On 14 December 1709 he moved the address to Queen Anne, urging some dignity in the church for Benjamin Hoadly, based on his justification of Revolution principles. He voted for the impeachment of Dr Sacheverell in 1710. He was returned again for Weymouth at the 1710 British general election and survived a petition against his return.

== Wit and patron ==
Henley was one of the foremost Whig wits who welcomed Jonathan Swift's appearance in London life after the publication of the Tale of a Tub. He once said of Swift that he would be "a beast for ever, after the order of Melchisedeck", and Swift reported the witticism in the Journal to Stella. Letters from Henley in 1708–10 are in Swift's Works.

The Purcells had patronage from Henley, who was musical. The songs composed by Daniel Purcell for the opera of Brutus of Alba were dedicated on their publication in 1696 to Henley and Richard Norton, a friend; and his music for John Oldmixon's opera of The Grove, or Love's Paradise, was worked out on a visit to Henley and other friends in Hampshire. He himself wrote several pieces for music, and almost finished Daniel Purcell's opera of Alexander. Samuel Garth dedicated to him his poem The Dispensary, and he was a member of the Kit-Cat Club.

== Death and legacy ==
Henley died of apoplexy in August 1711. He left three sons, of whom the eldest, Anthony, MP for Southampton from 1727 to 1734, was a jester like his father. The younger sons were Robert Henley, 1st Earl of Northington, and Bertie, a churchman and prebendary of Bristol (died 1760). His widow afterwards married, as his second wife, her relative Henry Bertie.

Henley was a half-brother of John Henley and Robert Henley, both MPs. One of his sisters married Sir Theodore Janssen, the other was the wife of Sir John Rogers, 2nd Baronet. Henley found them both marriage portions in 1698. His marriage with Mary Bertie has been attributed to a need to clear himself from resulting debts.

The royal assent was given on 22 May 1712 to a bill arranging for the payment of the portions of Henley's younger children. From a letter written in 1733 it is apparent that Swift continued his friendship to the sons.

== Works ==
John Nichols believed that Henley wrote for The Tatler. When the Whig Medley was started by Arthur Maynwaring as a counterblast to the Tory Examiner, one of the papers was written by Henley, and he is said to have aided William Harrison in his continuation of the Tatler. An anecdote told by him on the death of Charles II was in Gilbert Burnet's History of his own Time, and was criticised by Bevil Higgons in his volume of Remarks on Burnet. Alexander Pope said that Henley contributed the "Life of His Music-Master, Tom D'Urfey", a chapter in the Memoirs of Scriblerus. Henley liked describing the manners and foibles of servants, and possibly some of the pastiches of communications from them in The Spectator came from him.

== Notes ==
- Sambrook, James. "Henley, Anthony". Oxford Dictionary of National Biography (online ed.). Oxford University Press. doi:10.1093/ref:odnb/12927. (Subscription, Wikipedia Library access or UK public library membership required.)

Attribution

This article incorporates text from a publication now in the public domain: Stephen, Leslie; Lee, Sidney, eds. (1891). "Henley, Anthony". Dictionary of National Biography. Vol. 25. London: Smith, Elder & Co.

Parliament of England
Preceded by John Smith; Sir Robert Smyth, Bt	Member of Parliament for Andover; 1698–1701; With: John Smith	Succeeded by John Smith; Francis Shepheard
Preceded by George St Lo; Charles Churchill; Sir Christopher Wren; Maurice Ashley	Member of Parliament for Weymouth and Melcombe Regis; 1702–1707; With: Charles Churchill; Sir Christopher Wren 1702; George St Lo 1702–1705; Henry Thynne 1702–1707; Maurice Ashley 1705–1707	Succeeded by Parliament of Great Britain
Parliament of Great Britain
Preceded by Parliament of England	Member of Parliament for Weymouth and Melcombe Regis; 1707–1711; With: Maurice Ashley 1707-1711; Charles Churchill 1707-1711; Henry Thynne (1707–1709); Edward Clavell (1709–1710); James Littleton 1710-1711; William Betts 1710-1711; Sir Thomas Hardy 1711; William Harvey1711	Succeeded by Maurice Ashley; Sir Thomas Hardy; William Harvey; Reginald Marriott
