= Charles Churchill (British Army officer, born 1656) =

British army officer and politician (1656–1714)

General Charles Churchill
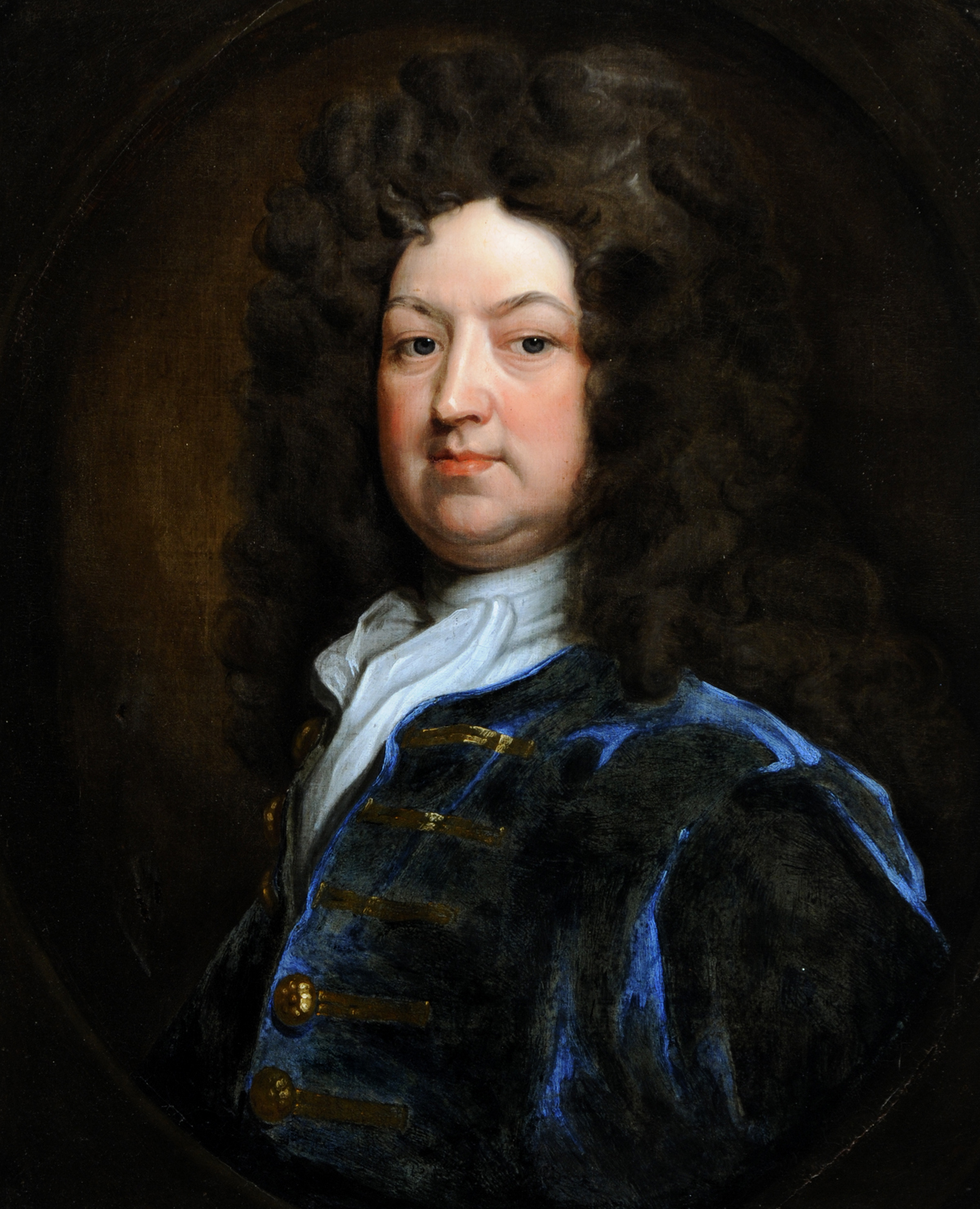
- Portrait by the circle of Sir Godfrey Kneller
- Born: 2 February 1656
- Died: 29 December 1714 (aged 58)
- Relatives: Winston Churchill (father); Elizabeth Drake (mother)
- Military career
- Allegiance: England; Great Britain
- Branch: English Army; British Army
- Service years: 1674–1714
- Rank: General
- Commands: 3rd Regiment of Foot; Coldstream Regiment of Foot Guards
- Conflicts: Monmouth Rebellion; Battle of Sedgemoor; Williamite War in Ireland; Siege of Cork; Nine Years' War; Battle of Steenkerque; Battle of Landen; War of the Spanish Succession; Battle of Blenheim; Passage of the Lines of Brabant; Battle of Ramillies

General Charles Churchill (2 February 1656 – 29 December 1714) was a British army officer and politician who served in the War of the Spanish Succession and sat in the English and British House of Commons from 1701 to 1710. He was a younger brother of John Churchill, 1st Duke of Marlborough and both his military and political careers were closely connected with his brother's. Along with Marlborough's Irish Chief of Staff William Cadogan, he was one of Churchill's closest advisors. He was a Tory, in contrast to his Whig brother who tolerated and possibly used Churchill's Tory connections.

== Life ==
Churchill was the son of Winston Churchill and his wife Elizabeth Drake, daughter of Sir John Drake of Ashe, Devon, and his wife Helena Butler (or Boteler). He became a page and, from 1672 to 1708, a gentlemen in the household of Prince George of Denmark. He became Lieutenant of the Tower of London in 1702.

Charles Churchill joined the English Army as an ensign in the 3rd Regiment of Foot in 1674 and later received the colonelcy of that unit. He fought in numerous wars and battles, including Sedgemoor during Monmouth's Rebellion. He served under his brother when he captured Cork from its Jacobite Irish Army garrison in 1690. He then served on the continent at the Steenkerque and Landen. Churchill was promoted to brigadier-general in 1690 and to major-general in 1694.

Churchill was returned as Member of Parliament for Weymouth and Melcombe Regis in a contest at the first general election of 1701 and was blacklisted for opposing preparations for war with France. He was returned unopposed in the second general election of 1701 and supported Harley for the Speaker in January 1702, He supported the motion on 26 February 1702 to vindicate the Commons' proceedings in impeaching William's Whig ministers. In 1702, he became a lieutenant-general, at the same time receiving the colonelcy of the Coldstream Regiment of Foot Guards. He was returned unopposed as MP for Weymouth at the 1702 English general election. At Blenheim in 1704, he served under his elder brother John Churchill, 1st Duke of Marlborough, and commanded the center of the allied line. During the March to the Danube he oversaw the artillery and infantry contingents. He was returned in a contest for Weymouth at the 1705 English general election. He supported the Court in the proceedings on the 'place clause' of the regency bill on 18 February 1706. At the battle of Ramillies, again serving under his brother, he ordered four brigades of foot to attack the village. He resigned his Lieutenancy of the Tower in 1706, and he served as Governor of Guernsey from 1706 to 1711. In 1707, he was made a full general. In late March 1708 onwards Churchill was 'seized with an apoplectic fit' but was non-the less returned as MP for Weymouth at the 1708 British general election. He suffered ongoing ill-health and began to drink heavily, and did not stand for Weymouth at the 1710 British general election.

== Family ==
Churchill married Mary Gould, daughter of James Gould on 9 February 1702. She later married to Montagu Venables-Bertie, 2nd Earl of Abingdon.

He was the father of Lieutenant-General Charles Churchill, by his mistress Elizabeth Dodd, and the grandfather of Charles Churchill, MP, by his son's mistress, the actress Anne Oldfield. His grandson married Lady Maria Walpole, illegitimate daughter of Robert Walpole, and had issue including Mary Churchill (2nd wife of the Earl Cadogan and ancestor of later earls).

His sister was Arabella, a royal mistress of King James II of Great Britain, and his brother George became an admiral.

== Notes ==
Parliament of England
Preceded by Arthur Shallett; Philip Taylor; Michael Harvey; Thomas Freke	Member of Parliament for Weymouth and Melcombe Regis; 1701–1707; With: Henry Thynne (1701); George St Lo (1701–1705); Michael Harvey (1701); Maurice Ashley (1701–1702); Sir Christopher Wren (1701–1702); Henry Thynne (1702–1707); Anthony Henley (1702–1707); Maurice Ashley (1705–1707)	Succeeded by Parliament of Great Britain
Parliament of Great Britain
Preceded by Parliament of England	Member of Parliament for Weymouth and Melcombe Regis; 1707–1710; With: Maurice Ashley; Anthony Henley; Henry Thynne (1707–1709); Edward Clavell (1709–1710)	Succeeded by Maurice Ashley; James Littleton; William Betts; Anthony Henley
Military offices
Preceded by Theophilus Oglethorpe	Colonel of 3rd (Prince George of Denmark's) Regiment; 1688–1707	Succeeded by The Duke of Argyll
Preceded by The Viscount Hatton	Governor of Guernsey; 1706–1714	Succeeded by Daniel Harvey
Preceded by The Lord Cutts	Colonel of the Coldstream Regiment of Foot Guards; 1707–1714	Succeeded by William Cadogan
