= Arthur Shallett =

British Army general

General Arthur Shallett
- Military career
- Allegiance: United Kingdom
- Branch: British Army
- Commands: Buffs (Royal East Kent Regiment)
- Conflicts: War of the Spanish Succession

Arthur Shallett was a British Army general who served during the War of the Spanish Succession. He was from Cornwall. He was replaced by Charles Churchill.
