= Philip Jennings (Queenborough MP) =

English lawyer and politician

Philip Jennings (c. 1679 – 10 February 1740) of Dudleston Hall, Shropshire was an English lawyer and politician.

He was the oldest son of Edward Jennings, QC, a barrister who later became Member of Parliament (MP) for East Looe. Philip was a nephew of Admiral Sir John Jennings. He was educated at Eton and St John's College, Cambridge. He was called to the bar at the Inner Temple in 1704 and became a bencher in 1735. He succeeded his father in 1725.

He sat in the House of Commons of Great Britain from 1715 to 1722, as MP for Queenborough.

He married twice: firstly in 1705, Diana, the daughter of Sir William Bowyer, 2nd Bt., of Denham, Buckinghamshire, with whom he had a son, who predeceased him, and a daughter and secondly in 1721, Dorothy, the daughter of George Clerke of Launde Abbey, Leicestershire, with whom he had 3 sons and 6 daughters.

Parliament of the United Kingdom
Preceded by Thomas King; Charles Fotherby	Member of Parliament for Queenborough; 1715–1722; With: Thomas King	Succeeded by James Littleton; John Cope
