= Charles Abrahams (sculptor) =

Australian sculptor

Charles James Abrahams
- Died: 1868-05-10; South Head, New South Wales, Australia
- Education: Royal Academy
- Known for: Sculpture
- Spouse: Elizabeth Abrahams

Charles James Abrahams (died c. 10 May 1868) was a sculptor active in Sydney in the 1840s, reckoned to be the first to practice there.

Abrahams was the son of a successful London architect, and studied under one Swier of the Royal Academy. He arrived in Sydney by way of New Zealand, in 1843, and was an exhibitor at the first exhibition of sculpture to be held in Australia, at the Royal Hotel, Sydney in 1845.

He was responsible for a series of bas relief carving of saints and apostles on the walls of the Roman Catholic cathedral on Church Hill, Sydney.

He held an exhibition at the Society of Fine Arts in Sydney, 1847.

Abrahams was one of the first to use marble excavated from the Abercrombie Caves.

A bust of Sir Henry Parkes (1866), attributed to him, was presented to the Royal Australian Historical Society in 1927.

He died at South Head, New South Wales in 1868. His wife Elizabeth died in Glebe, New South Wales on 17 October 1869, aged 35 years.

Works by Abrahams have been held by the Tasmanian Museum and Art Gallery, and the Mitchell Library, Sydney.
