= Thomas King (died 1725) =

English Member of Parliament

Thomas King (probably before 1660 (Note: One source says that he was born "probably before 1660", and also says that he was the elder brother of John King. According to an unsourced statement in his Wikipedia article, John King was born c. 1655.) – 17 July 1725) was an English (after the Acts of Union 1707, British) professional soldier, lieutenant governor of Sheerness, Kent, and Member of Parliament for Queenborough, in Kent.

He was the eldest son of Thomas King (died 1688), MP for Harwich. He was the brother of John King (c. 1655 – 1737), Master of Charterhouse.

In 1678, he was commissioned as ensign in the 3rd Regiment of Foot, and was in 1687 promoted to second lieutenant. In 1688, he transferred to the 13th Foot with the rank of captain, and in the same year to the 2nd Foot Guards with the rank of captain and later lieutenant-colonel. In 1689, he served in the 1st Foot Guards as both captain and lieutenant-colonel. (Note: His progression of rank in 1688 and 1689 is unclear. It is possible, among other things, that he was only promoted lieutenant colonel once, or that he accepted a temporary reduction in rank on transfer to the senior regiment.) He was made brevet colonel in 1706, and retired before 1715. In 1688 and 1689, he was deputy governor of the Tower of London. From 1690 until his death, he was lieutenant governor of Sheerness. There seems to be no record of his having taken part in active service.

He was elected MP for Queenborough nine times: at a by-election in 1696, and at general elections in 1698, January and November 1701, 1702 and 1705; he did not stand in 1708; but was elected in 1710, 1713 and 1715. Queenborough was a rotten borough, in which a few dozen voters returned two MPs. (Note: 19 freemen voted in 1690, 46 in 1713, and 55 in 1715.) The 1696 by-election is well-documented. Caleb Banks (1659–1696), one of the MPs, was in poor health. He tried to persuade Admiral Sir George Rooke (1650–1709) to stand for election as his successor. However, Henry Sydney, 1st Earl of Romney (1641–1704), colonel of the 1st Foot Guards, wanted to secure the seat for King, who was lieutenant-colonel in his own regiment. He offered to support Rooke if he chose to stand in Winchelsea instead. By the time Rooke decided to stand in Queenborough, he was too late. King had been 'treating' the freemen (land-owners) of the borough (plying them with food and drink to secure their votes). Rooke visited Queenborough on 1 October, but Banks has died and Robert Crawford, the other MP, turned up late. Rooke was accompanied by four members of the Navy Board, Edmund Dummer, Sir Richard Haddock, Dennis Lyddell and Charles Sergison, and by the Commissioner of Chatham, Sir Edmund Gregory, who was responsible for Sheerness Dockyard; but neither their presence nor the expenditure by Rooke of £200 could persuade King to withdraw. Rooke thought of standing against King, and then petitioning the House of Commons for redress should King be elected; a scheme flawed by the fact that Rooke too had, by his own admission, been illegally 'treating' the voters. In another line of attack, James Vernon (1646–1727) was sure that King's superiors could be persuaded to order him to stand down. In the event, King was returned unopposed. (Note: Rooke was elected MP for Portsmouth in 1698, which seat he represented until 1708.)

Later political manoeuvering in Queenborough during King's time was also not without intrigue. In 1697, nine of the electors (including Sir John Banks (1627–1699; MP for Queenborough 1690–1695), James Herbert (1660–1704; MP for Queenborough 1689–1690) and Gerard Gore) were disfranchised for non-residence and for failure to attend to corporation business. The triumph of the Army over the Navy seemed complete. It did not last. Crawford's support in Parliament in 1705 of the Tackers left him vulnerable, and he was defeated in that year's general election by Sir John Jennings (1664–1743), a Navy officer, in a vicious campaign marked by the beating to death of a Scotsman who had campaigned against Crawford. (Major Winsley of Sheerness Castle was charged with the crime, but acquitted at an assize court in Maidstone, Kent.) King did not stand in 1708, and was replaced by Henry Withers, another soldier. Withers relinquished the seat for the 1710 election, and King and James Herbert were returned "by the great majority of votes". Jennings, the losing candidate, petitioned the House of Commons against the "gross bribery and other undue practices" of his opponents, but his complaint came to nothing. Herbert raised a similar complaint after the 1713 election, in which he had been defeated by Charles Fotherby, another Navy officer; but he too got nowhere. King stood for re-election in 1722 and lost. He and his fellow candidate, John Lord Viscount Carmichell, filed a petition with the House of Commons alleging that the victors has won by "Bribery, and other unlawful Means"; but were later granted permission to withdraw it.

King was married, and had two daughters. As an MP, he was classed as "a Whig who would often vote Tory". During the 1696 election, Henry Sydney, his patron, called him a "blockhead"; and George Rooke, his opponent, said that he was of "shallow capacity". In 1721, King paid for improvements to Holy Trinity Church, Queenborough. (Note: If King had hoped that refurbishing the church would win him support in the 1722 election, it evidently did not.) In old age, John Perceval, 1st Earl of Egmont (1683–1748) said that King was "full of anecdotes of King Charles the Second's reign". (Note: Charles II reigned 1660-1685.)

== Notes ==
Parliament of England
Preceded by Robert Crawford; Caleb Banks	Member of Parliament for Queenborough; 1696-1707; With: Robert Crawford (1696-1705); Sir John Jennings (1705-1707)	Succeeded by Parliament of Great Britain
Parliament of Great Britain
Preceded by Parliament of England	Member of Parliament for Queenborough; 1707-1708; With: Sir John Jennings (1707-1708)	Succeeded by Sir John Jennings; Henry Withers
Parliament of Great Britain
Preceded by Sir John Jennings; Henry Withers	Member of Parliament for Queenborough; 1710-1722; With: James Herbert (the third) (1710-1713); Charles Fotherby (1713-1715); Philip Jennings (1715-1722)	Succeeded by James Littleton; John Cope
