= John King (master of Charterhouse) =

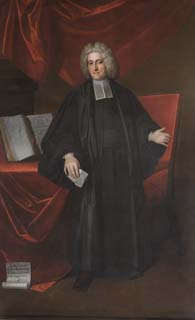
John King.

John King (c. 1655 – 4 August 1737) was an important English clergyman, the son of Thomas King. He was the younger brother of Thomas King (died 1725), soldier and MP. He matriculated at Christ Church, Oxford on 4 July 1678, receiving his B.A. in 1682, his M.A. in 1685, and his B.D. and D.D. in 1704. He then became the rector of Shalden, Hampshire. From the mid-1690s, he was Preacher at the Charterhouse School, and, upon the death of Thomas Burnet in 1715, King was made Master of Charterhouse. A devout man who carried a copy of Thomas à Kempis's Imitation of Christ with him everywhere, King had a formative influence on John Wesley, who was a gownboy at the Charterhouse School 1714–1720. King was made Archdeacon of Colchester in 1722, and a Canon of Bristol in 1728.
