= Ralph Entwistle =

English labourer

- Born: c. 1804; Bolton, England
- Died: 2 November 1830; Bathurst, New South Wales, Australia
- Status: Executed by hanging
- Allegiance: Ribbon Gang
- Conviction: Murder
- Penalty: Death

Ralph Entwistle (c. 1804 – 2 November 1830) was an English labourer who was transported to the British penal colony of New South Wales as a convict in 1827. As a member of the Ribbon Gang, his escape sparked the Bathurst Rebellion of 1830. He, along with nine of his gang members, were captured by police and executed in 1830.

== Biography ==
Entwistle was born in 1803 (possibly 1805) in Bolton, a small mill town near Manchester. He was initially an apprentice bricklayer, but in 1826, he and an accomplice stole clothing after breaking into a house. His partner was freed due to lack of evidence but Entwistle was sentenced to transportation for life in 1827.

Initially detained in a private prison hulk on the Thames, he was boarded onto the convict ship John, departing around 18 July 1827 along with 187 other convicts, arriving in Sydney on 25 November. In Australia, he was officially known as "Convict 27-2626" and was assigned to Stowford, John Lipscombe's remote farm near the then frontier area of Bathurst.

By 1829, he was under the impression that he had earned, or was eligible for, a ticket of leave, unusual for "lifers" who were not normally eligible until at least 12–14 years of exceptional service. In November that year, Lipscombe asked Entwistle to do one last task - to accompany another convict and to take a bullock dray loaded with wool bales through the mountains to Sydney, 225 kilometres (140 miles) away, for sale and return with supplies and provisions from the takings.

At the end of the first day, and after joining another similar convict group, the four men decided to cool off in the Macquarie River. While bathing nude, a convoy accompanying the governor, Lt. Gen. Sir Ralph Darling, arrived but did not notice the men who were now in hiding. A third party from Bathurst, led by Police Magistrate Thomas Evernden, travelling to greet the governor did discover them and he later sent constables to arrest and imprison them.

Although having apparently not broken any law, Evernden sentenced each man to 50 lashes with a cat-o-nine tails in public. Evernden then cancelled his promised ticket of leave (possibly out of fear of the governor learning and questioning him about it) and Entwistle was compelled to continue his trip to Sydney and return to farm labour.

Disillusioned by the authorities and by the lack of intercession by Lipscombe in his arrest and treatment, he became a bushranger after escaping with four others from the farm on 23 September 1830. Heading east, they stole firearms, horses, and supplies from numerous farms while also recruiting or coercing scores of other convicts to join them.

The gang, led by Michael Kearney, had grown to more than 50 members by the time they arrived at the Evernden farm, seeking revenge and triggering the Bathurst rebellion. Near the Abercrombie River, the uprising failed, and Entwistle and others were found guilty of the murder of Evernden's farm overseer. Under the Bushranger Act, he and nine others were promptly hanged on 2 November in Bathurst - the largest mass hanging in NSW history - on the site of what is now known as Ribbon Gang Lane.

== Media ==
A book was released in 2020 on the gang called Bone and Beauty: The Ribbon Gang’s Rebellion by author Jeanette M. Thompson. The book explains some of the reasoning for Entwistle's rebellion to more than just an unfair punishment, but also to the Ribbonism movement of the time.
