= John Jennings (Royal Navy officer) =

Royal Navy officer and politician (1664–1743)

Admiral Sir John Jennings
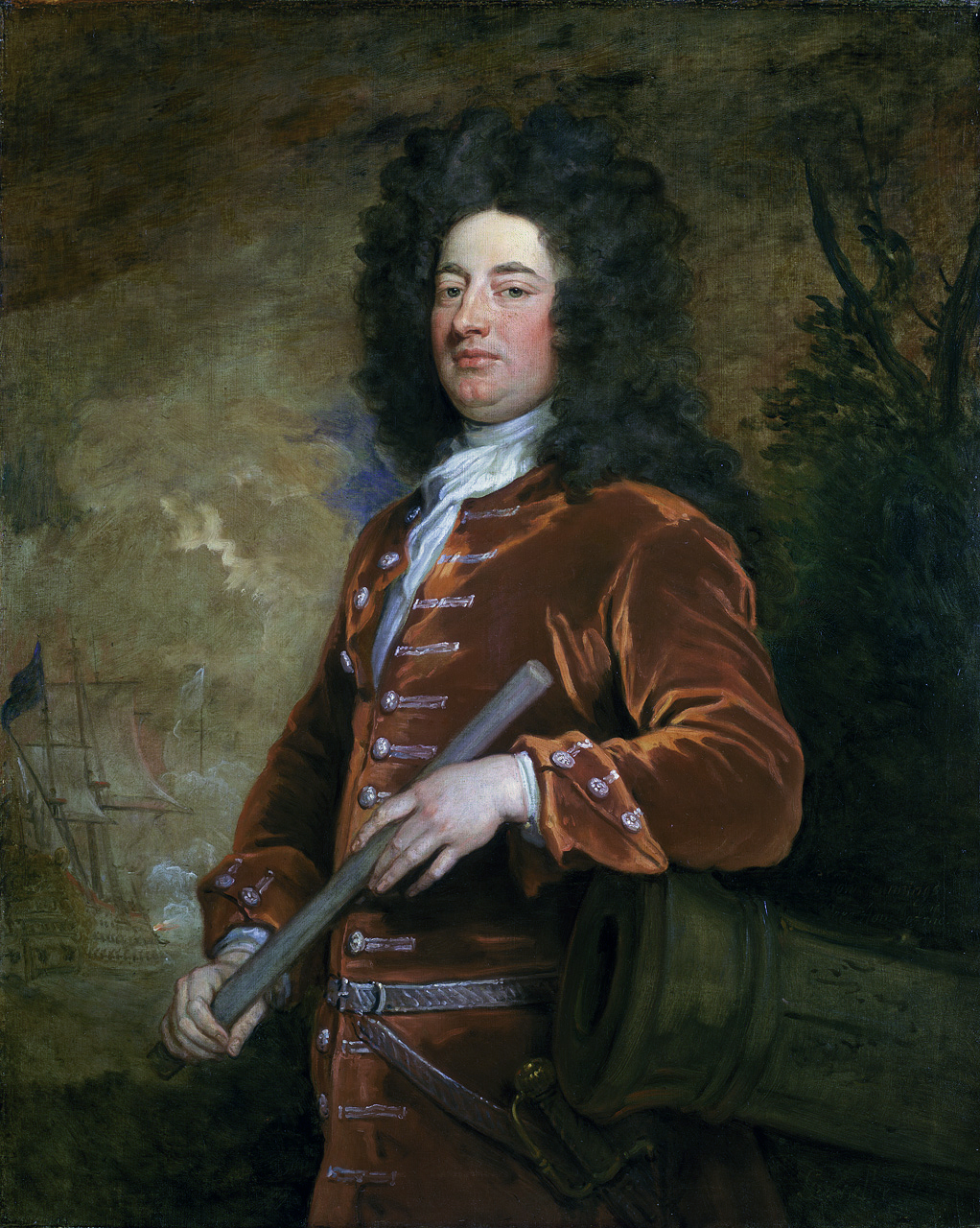
- Portrait by Sir Godfrey Kneller, 1708-1709
- Born: 1664
- Died: 23 December 1743 (aged 79); Greenwich, London
- Military career
- Allegiance: England; Great Britain
- Branch: Royal Navy
- Service years: 1687–1743
- Rank: Admiral
- Commands: HMS St Paul; HMS Experiment; HMS Victory; HMS Mary; HMS Chichester; HMS Plymouth; HMS Kent; HMS St George; Mediterranean Fleet; Greenwich Hospital
- Conflicts: War of Spanish Succession

Admiral Sir John Jennings (1664 – 23 December 1743) was a Royal Navy officer and Whig politician who sat in the English and British House of Commons between 1705 and 1734. He commanded HMS Kent at Cadiz and Vigo in 1702 during the War of the Spanish Succession. He went on to be Commander-in-Chief of the Jamaica Station, then Senior Naval Lord and finally Governor of Greenwich Hospital.

== Early life ==
Jennings was the fifteenth child of Philip Jennings of Duddleston Hall, Shropshire and his wife Christian Eyton, daughter of Sir Gerard Eyton of Eyton, Shropshire. He was descended from a Shropshire family which had suffered for its adherence to the Royalist cause during the English Civil War. He married Alice Breton.

== Naval career ==
Jennings was appointed a lieutenant on HMS Pearl in 1687, and served with the same rank in HMS St David and HMS Swallow, before being promoted to the command of the St Paul, a fireship. In 1690 he was made captain of the newly launched HMS Experiment, of 32 guns, and employed in cruising off the coast of Ireland, where he intercepted a number of small vessels which were being used as transports by James II's forces. In 1693, Jennings was nominated captain of the Victory, flagship of Sir John Ashby; later the same year he was transferred to the 62-gun HMS Mary, in which he went to the Mediterranean with Admiral Russell. In 1696, he was removed to the Chichester, of 80 guns; and, in the following year, was entrusted with the command of the Plymouth, with which he captured a St Malo privateer. Shortly afterwards, together with the frigate HMS Rye, he fell in with three French ships: one quickly surrendered, and Jennings, leaving the Rye to look after their prize, pursued the other two and succeeded in compelling one to strike her flag after a vigorous defence. Having conducted their prizes to port, the Rye and the Plymouth fell in with the Severn, a British man-of-war, and the three ships steered together for the coast of France, where they took five vessels laden with wine from Bordeaux, and a small ship of war.

On the outbreak of the War of the Spanish Succession, Jennings commanded HMS Kent (of 70 guns) under Admiral Rooke at Cadiz and Vigo in 1702, where he played a part in the destruction of the Franco-Spanish fleet. He took part in the capture of Gibraltar, and was captain of the 96-gun HMS St George at the Battle of Málaga in 1704. He was knighted for his exploits by Queen Anne on 9 September 1704, and having been promoted to rear admiral in 1705, became Commander-in-Chief of the Jamaica Station in 1706. He was promoted to vice admiral in 1708 and admiral in 1709. His attack on Tenerife in 1706 was unsuccessful. He commanded the fleet off Lisbon from 1708 to 1710, and was later Commander-in-Chief of the Mediterranean Fleet.

== Parliamentary career ==
At the 1705 English general election, Jennings was returned as Whig Member of Parliament for Queenborough. He was absent from the division on the choice of Speaker on 25 October 1705 and was absent on active service until the winter of 1707–8. Then in November he gave evidence to the Lords on the encouragement of trade in the West Indies and in January 1708 gave evidence on the bill for the encouragement of seamen. He also submitted a paper containing thirteen proposals to improve methods of manning the fleet, of which three were included in a Lords address to the Queen. He was returned again for Queenborough at the 1708 British general election. In parliament, he supported the naturalization of the Palatines in 1709 and voted for the impeachment of Dr Sacheverell in 1710. At the 1710 British general election, he was defeated at Queenborough, but was returned in the poll as MP for Portsmouth. However he was unseated on petition on 3 February 1711.

Jennings was returned as MP for Rochester on the Admiralty interest at the 1715 British general election. He voted with the Administration, except on the Peerage Bill which he opposed. He joined the Board of Admiralty under the Whig government in October 1714 but stood down when the Government fell in April 1717. He returned to the Admiralty Board under the Second Stanhope–Sunderland ministry in March 1718 In 1719 he was one of the original backers of the Royal Academy of Music, establishing a London opera company which commissioned numerous works from Handel and others.

He was also appointed governor of Greenwich Hospital and Ranger of Greenwich Park from 1720, and presented the marble statue of George II by Rysbrack which stands in the Grand Square of the hospital. in September 1721, he was advanced to Senior Naval Lord Also in 1721, he acquired Newsells Bury at Barkway in Hertfordshire. He was becoming deaf, but resigned from the Admiralty Board in June 1727 because he objected to serving under Lord Berkeley, the first Sea lord. He was returned again as MP for Rochester at the 1727 British general election. Although Berkeley was dismissed from the Admiralty board in 1727, Jennings was not keen to return, hoping instead for a promotion or peerage. He was promoted to rear-admiral of England in January 1733, but resigned a year later when Sir John Norris was made admiral of the fleet and commander in chief.

== Death and legacy ==
Jennings died at Greenwich on 23 December 1743 at the age of 79, and was buried in Westminster Abbey. A separate monument exists at Barkway Parish Church sculpted by John Michael Rysbrack.

With his wife Alice, he had one son, George, who duly inherited Newsells.

== Sources ==
- Campbell, John (1813). Naval history of Great Britain, including the history and lives of the British admirals. Vol. 4. Stockdale.
- Cundall, Frank (1915). Historic Jamaica. West India Committee.
- Laughton, John Knox (1892). "Jennings, John" . In Lee, Sidney (ed.). Dictionary of National Biography. Vol. 29. London: Smith, Elder & Co.
- Prince, Hugh C. (2008). Parks in Hertfordshire Since 1500. University of Hertfordshire Press. ISBN 978-0954218997.
- Rodger, N.A.M. (1979). The Admiralty. Offices of State. Lavenham: T. Dalton Ltd. ISBN 0900963948.

Parliament of England
| Preceded by Thomas King; Robert Crawford | Member of Parliament for Queenborough; 1705–1707; With: Thomas King | Succeeded by Parliament of Great Britain |
Parliament of Great Britain
| Preceded by Parliament of England | Member of Parliament for Queenborough; 1707–1710; With: Thomas King 1707–1708; Henry Withers 1708–1710 | Succeeded by Thomas King; James Herbert |
| Preceded by Admiral George Churchill; Rear-Admiral Sir Charles Wager | Member of Parliament for Portsmouth; 1710–1711; With: Rear-Admiral Sir Charles Wager | Succeeded by Admiral Sir James Wishart; Sir William Gifford |
| Preceded by Admiral Sir John Leake; William Cage | Member of Parliament for Rochester; 1715–1734; With: Sir Thomas Palmer 1715–1724; Sir Thomas Colby 1724–1727; David Polhill 1727–1734 | Succeeded by David Polhill; Admiral Nicholas Haddock |
Military offices
| Preceded by William Kerr | Commander-in-Chief, Jamaica Station; 1706 | Succeeded by Charles Wager |
| Preceded by Sir George Byng | Senior Naval Lord; 1721–1727 | Succeeded by Sir John Norris |
| Preceded by Lord Aylmer | Governor, Greenwich Hospital; 1720–1743 | Succeeded by Sir John Balchen |
Honorary titles
| Preceded by Viscount Torrington | Rear-Admiral of Great Britain; 1733–1743 | Succeeded by Thomas Mathews |
