= Bathurst Rebellion =

Rebellion in Australia in 1830

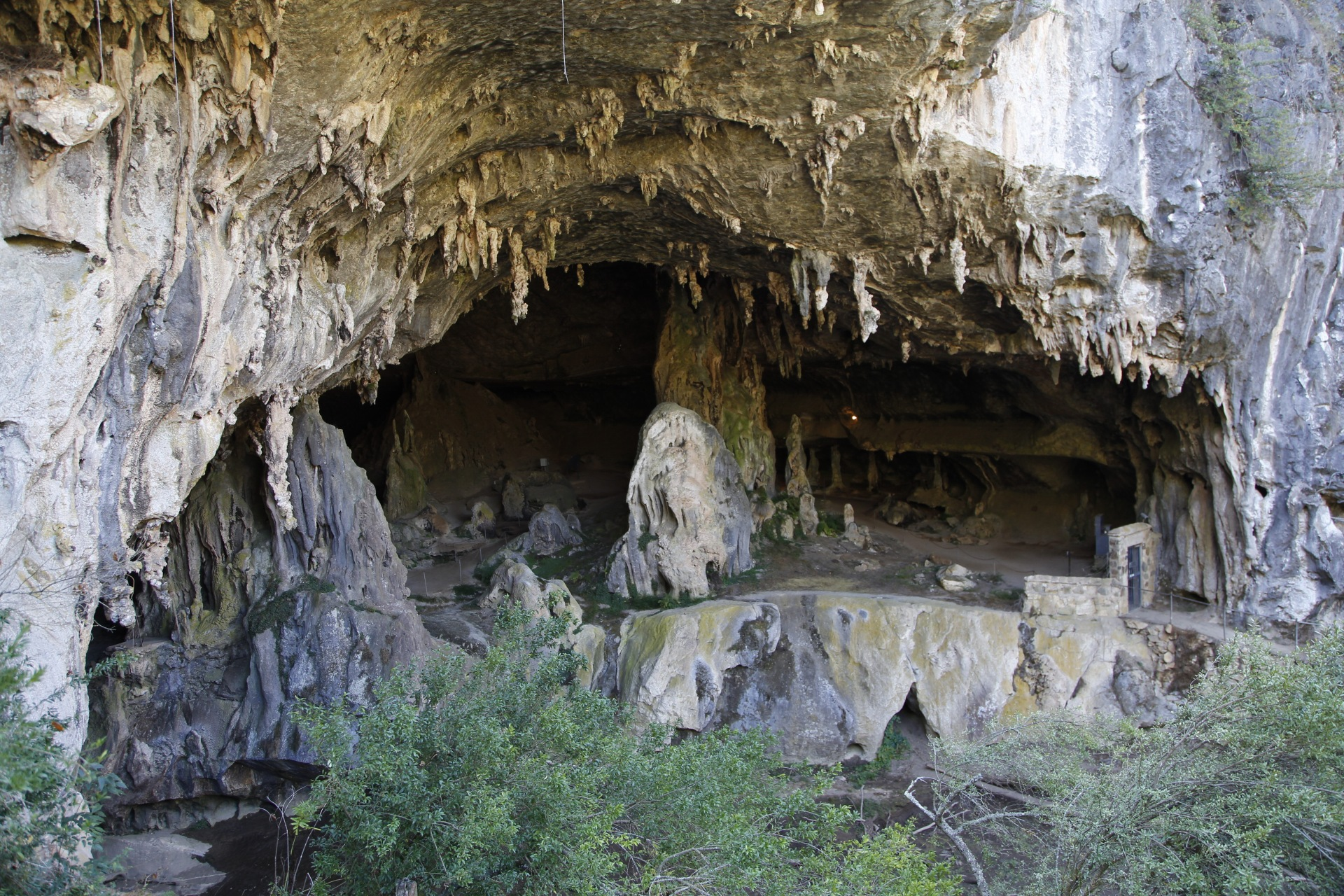
Abercrombie Caves, the site of a shootout between the Ribbon gang and a party of troopers and civilian volunteers

The Bathurst Rebellion of 1830 was an outbreak of bushranging near Bathurst in the British penal colony (now the Australian state) of New South Wales.

The rebellion involved a group of escaped convicts who ransacked villages and engaged in shootouts over the course of three weeks. Led by 25-year-old English-born convict Ralph Entwistle, the group numbered up to 80 men at its peak, making it the largest convict uprising in New South Wales history since the Castle Hill rebellion of 1804. The rebels became known as the Ribbon gang on account of Entwistle wearing "a profusion of white streamers about his head".

== Background ==
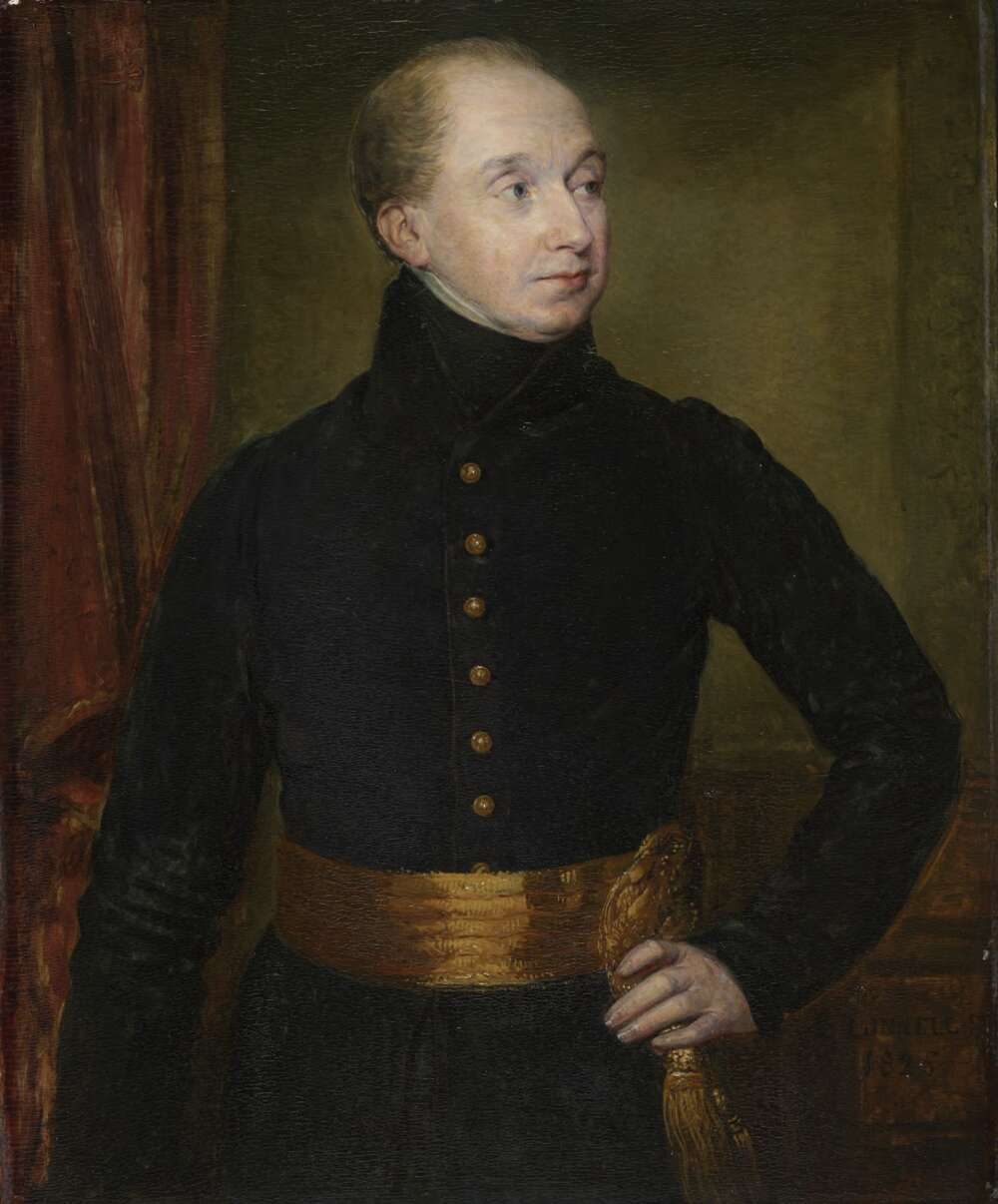
Governor Ralph Darling

Entwistle was a Bolton labourer convicted of stealing clothing and transported to New South Wales in 1827. After arriving in Sydney, he and a few other convicts were assigned to squatter John Lipscombe and sent across the newly traversed Blue Mountains to work on his land, near Bathurst. In November 1829, Entwistle and another assigned servant drove one of their master's bullock drays to Sydney Markets to deliver wool, and on returning to Bathurst, in the heat of the day, stopped for a skinny dip in the Macquarie River. Governor Ralph Darling and his party, then touring Bathurst, happened to pass by the bathing convicts, who were subsequently hauled before the Police Magistrate of Bathurst, Thomas Evernden, and charged with "causing an affront to the Governor", despite Darling not having seen the incident. Entwistle and his companion were each sentenced to a public flogging of 50 lashes. This experience left Entwistle embittered, and within a year, he had taken up bushranging and persuaded other convicts to join him.

== Rebellion ==
In late September 1830, Entwistle and his men began raiding farms, seizing firearms and liberating convicts in the process. The gang had grown to 50 members by the time they arrived at the farm of Thomas Evernden, seeking revenge, but the magistrate was absent. When the farm's overseer, James Greenwood, refused to allow Evernden's convict servants to join the gang, Entwistle and his men threatened to shoot him dead. Greenwood still refused, saying they were "not game enough" to shoot him, at the same time baring his chest. Entwistle and two other bushrangers, Gahan and Kearney, fired immediately, killing Greenwood.

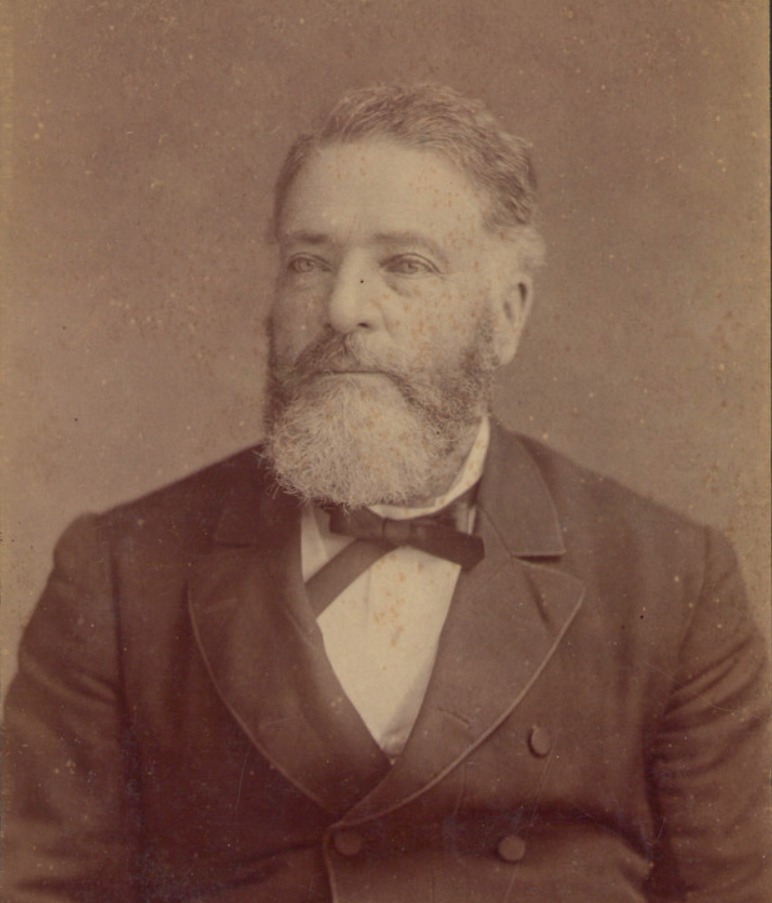
William Henry Suttor commanded the volunteers.

When news of the murder reached Bathurst, the locals met at the courthouse to rally support for the settlement's six troopers. Twelve men volunteered, including pastoralist and politician William Henry Suttor, who was chosen as the volunteers' leader, with his brother Charles second in command. By this stage, the Ribbon Gang had trekked to the Abercrombie River, and at Trunkey Creek, the hard core of the group, led by Entwistle, splintered off and headed for the Abercrombie Caves. Most of the other forcibly recruited convicts returned to their assigned farms. Suttor's volunteers, together with the troopers under the command of Major Donald McPherson, set out for the caves, passing through stations the gang had ransacked, and the next day near sundown, with the assistance of two Aboriginal trackers, found and cornered the gang—now reduced to 20 men. Over 300 shots were fired in the ensuing gunfight, and several men on both sides were wounded, at least two bushrangers mortally. As night fell, the volunteers were forced to retire to Bathurst, allowing time for the Ribbon Gang to move to a more secure location beyond the caves—a bald hill, now known as Bushranger's Hill.

The next battle of the Bathurst Rebellion involved a police party led by Lieutenant James Brown of the 57th Regiment of Foot. The bushrangers claimed a victory, killing two of Brown's constables and five of his horses. As Brown and his men returned to Bathurst, military reinforcements were called for; 130 British Army soldiers from the 39th Regiment of Foot began the march from Sydney whilst members of the New South Wales Mounted Police were dispatched from Goulburn via the convict-built Tuena Road. The Ribbon Gang continued to raid homesteads and attract recruits as they moved through Cowra, and in the vicinity of Galong, near Boorowa, encountered the mounted troopers from Goulburn, commanded by Lieutenant John McAllister. Men from both sides were wounded in the gun battle that followed, including McAllister, who was shot in the thigh. The troopers retreated to their police barracks at Bong Bong, taking three wounded bushrangers prisoners with them. The Ribbon Gang was now exhausted and depleted of men, and once the combined military force from Bathurst and the infantry regiment from Sydney arrived, the remaining bushrangers either dispersed or surrendered.

== Aftermath ==
On 30 October 1830, the bushrangers were put on trial in the Bathurst Court House by the order of Governor Ralph Darling. They were tried by a Special Commission and a jury of military officers, with His Honor the Chief Justice of New South Wales Francis Forbes present.

Ralph Entwistle, William Gahan, Michael Kearney, Patrick Gleeson, Thomas Dunn and John Shepherd were convicted of the murder of James Greenwood and hanged. The remaining bushrangers— Robert Webster, James Driver, Dominic Daby and John Kenny— were hanged for plundering farmhouses. The public execution took place on 2 November in Bathurst on the site of what is now known as Ribbon Gang Lane. After being kept on display for a day "as a warning", the bodies were buried in two mass graves, five in each.

== Legacy ==
In the early 1900s, a caretaker of the Abercrombie Caves discovered buried in the mud floor of one of the caves a set of convict era leg irons, thought to have been dropped by one of the soldiers sent to hunt down the Ribbon gang. The cave subsequently became known as Bushrangers Cave.

Australian folk and country singer Lionel Long included a song titled "Bathurst Rebellion" on his 1963 album The Bold Bushrangers.

== Bibliography ==
Books

- Bialowas, Henry (2010). Ten Dead Men: A Speculative History of the Ribbon Gang. ISBN 978-0-646-54418-2.
- Connor, John; Stockings, Craig, eds. (2013). Before the Anzac Dawn: A Military History of Australia to 1915. NewSouth. ISBN 9781742241616.
- Fry, Ken (1993). Beyond the Barrier: Class Formation in a Pastoral Society: Bathurst, 1818–1848. Crawford House Press. ISBN 9781863330978.
- Greaves, Bernard (1964). The Story of Bathurst. Angus and Robertson.
- Powell, Gregory (2016). Bushranger Tracks: Across New South Wales and Victoria. New Holland Publishers Pty, Limited. ISBN 9781742577784.
- Neil Stewart, Gordon (1983). "Convict Rebel: Ralph Entwistle". In Fry, Eric (ed.). Rebels and Radicals. Allen and Unwin. ISBN 978-0-9803466-6-4.

Webpages

- Jones, Andrew (2003). "It all started with a skinny dip". Lateline. Archived from the original on 16 February 2015.
