= 39th (Dorsetshire) Regiment of Foot =

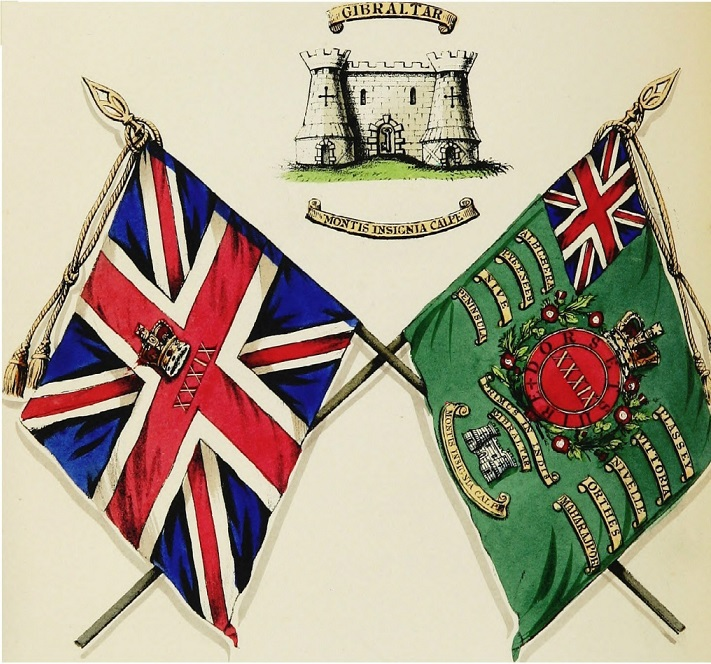
- 1853 illustration of the regimental colours
- Active: 1702 to 1881
- Country: Kingdom of England (1702–1707); Kingdom of Great Britain (1707–1800); United Kingdom (1801–1881)
- Branch: British Army
- Type: Infantry
- Size: One battalion (2 battalions 1803–1815)
- Garrison/HQ: Dorchester Barracks, Dorchester
- Nicknames: "Shankey's Horses", "The Green Linnets", "The Flamers"
- Colors: Pea Green Facings, Gold Braided Lace
- Engagements: War of the Spanish Succession; War of the Austrian Succession; Seven Years' War; French Revolutionary Wars; Napoleonic Wars; Coorg War; Gwalior campaign Crimean War

The 39th (Dorsetshire) Regiment of Foot was an infantry regiment of the British Army, raised in 1702. Under the Childers Reforms it amalgamated with the 54th (West Norfolk) Regiment of Foot to form the Dorsetshire Regiment in 1881.

== History ==
=== Early years ===
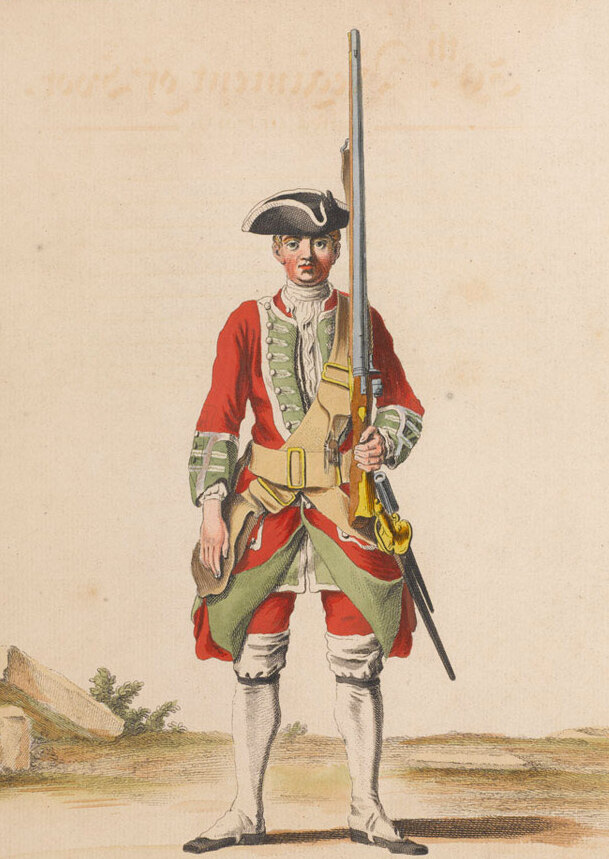
c. 1742 engraving of a regimental private

c. 1751 painting of a regimental grenadier (right)

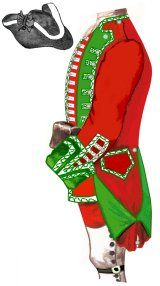
Regimental uniform for privates in 1756

The regiment was first raised by Adam Loftus, 1st Viscount Lisburne as Viscount Lisburne's Regiment of Foot in 1689 but was disbanded in 1697. It was re-raised in Ireland, without lineal connection to the previous regiment, by Colonel Richard Coote as Richard Coote's Regiment of Foot in August 1702. The regiment landed at Lisbon in June 1707 for service in the War of the Spanish Succession. It saw action at the Battle of La Gudina in May 1709 and then remained in Portugal until 1713 when it embarked for Gibraltar and then moved to Menorca later in the year. It was posted to Ireland in 1719 and sailed to Gibraltar in 1726 to reinforce the garrison. The regiment sailed for Jamaica in 1729 and then returned to Ireland in 1732.

The regiment served as marines from March 1744 to September 1746 when it took part in the Raid on Lorient during the War of the Austrian Succession. The regiment then spent another two years serving as marines and then returned to Ireland. On 1 July 1751 a royal warrant was issued which provided that in future regiments would no longer be known by their colonel's name, but would bear a regimental number based on their precedence: the regiment became the 39th Regiment of Foot. The regiment was posted to India in 1754 and saw action at the Battle of Chandannagar in March 1757 during the Seven Years' War. Under the command of Major Eyre Coote, the regiment played a major part in capturing the fort of Katwa at the Battle of Plassey in June 1757. The regiment returned to Ireland in autumn 1758 and was engaged in the Great Siege of Gibraltar in 1779 and the following three years.

=== Napoleonic wars ===
In 1782 the regiment took a county title as the 39th (East Middlesex) Regiment of Foot.

In 1787 the regiment was involved in the Calton Weavers Strike in Glasgow, commanded by Lieutenant Colonel Kellet. A volley of musket fire killed three of the weavers. Three other weavers were mortally wounded. Further disturbances later in the day were quickly suppressed by the troops. A dark day in the history of the British Army.

The regiment sailed for the West Indies took part in the capture of Martinique in March 1794, the capture of Saint Lucia in April 1794 and the attack on Guadeloupe in June 1794 during the French Revolutionary Wars. The British troops at Guadeloupe were forced to surrender in December 1794 and were held in captivity for over a year. The regiment was reformed in Ireland the following year by absorbing the short-lived 104th Regiment of Foot (Royal Manchester Volunteers). The regiment participated in a task force under Major-General John Whyte to capture the Dutch settlements of Demerara, Essequibo, and Berbice in April and May 1796. The regiment moved to Suriname in October 1800 to Barbados in December 1802 and then returned to England in March 1803.

In 1803 a 2nd battalion was raised. The 1st battalion moved in Naples in January 1806 and to Sicily shortly thereafter. In 1807 a number of regiments had their territorial affiliations shuffled, with the East Middlesex title passing to the 77th Foot and the 39th taking the Dorsetshire title previously held by the 35th (Sussex) Regiment of Foot to become the 39th (Dorsetshire) Regiment of Foot.

The 2nd battalion deployed to the Peninsula to support General Sir Arthur Wellesley in June 1809 and fought at the Battle of Talavera in July 1809, the Battle of Bussaco in September 1810 and the Siege of Badajoz in May 1811 as well as the Battle of Albuera in May 1811 and the Battle of Arroyo dos Molinos in October 1811.

Meanwhile, the 1st battalion deployed to the Peninsula in August 1811 and saw action at the Battle of Vitoria in June 1813 and across the Pyrenees, including the Battle of Sorauren in July 1813. It then pursued the French Army into France and fought at the Battle of Nivelle in November 1813, the Battle of the Nive in December 1813 and the Battle of Orthez in 1814 as well as the Battle of Toulouse in 1814. The battalion was then posted to North America for service in the War of 1812 and took part in the Battle of Plattsburgh in September 1814 before returning to England in July 1815. The regiment formed part of the Army of Occupation in France from 1815 to 1818 when it embarked for Ireland.

=== The Victorian era ===
The regiment arrived in the British colony of New South Wales toward the end of 1825 and saw service guarding convicts and establishing settlements at Hobart, Sydney, Swan River Colony and Bathurst, where in 1830 it helped suppress the bushranging insurgency known as the Bathurst Rebellion. The regiment left for India in July 1832. It saw action at various skirmishes in spring 1834 during the Coorg War and at the Battle of Maharajpore in December 1843 during the Gwalior campaign. It embarked for the Crimea in spring 1854 and saw action at the Siege of Sevastopol in winter 1854 before returning to Canada in 1856 and moving on to Bermuda in 1859; it returned to England in 1864 and was posted back to India in 1869.

As part of the Cardwell Reforms of the 1870s, where single-battalion regiments were linked together to share a single depot and recruiting district in the United Kingdom, the 39th was linked with the 75th (Stirlingshire) Regiment of Foot, and assigned to district no. 39 at Dorchester Barracks in Dorchester. On 1 July 1881 the Childers Reforms came into effect and the regiment amalgamated with the 54th (West Norfolk) Regiment of Foot to form the Dorsetshire Regiment.

== Battle honours ==
The battle honours of the regiment were as follows:

- Plassey, Gibraltar 1779-83, Albuhera, Vittoria, Pyrenees, Nivelle, Nive, Orthes, Peninsula, Maharajpore, Sevastopol

== Colonels ==
Colonels of the regiment included:

- 1689–1692 Adam Loftus, 1st Viscount Lisburne
- 1692–1702 Col. Richard Coote
- 1702–1703 Col. Richard Coote
- 1703–1719 Lt-Gen. Nicholas Sankey
- 1719–1722 Brig-Gen. Thomas Ferrers (also 23rd Dragoons, 17th Foot, Ferrers's Foot)
- 1722–1730 Brig-Gen. William Newton
- 1730–1732 Lt-Gen. Sir John Cope, KB
- 1732–1737 Brig-Gen. Thomas Wentworth
- 1737–1738 Gen. John Campbell, 4th Duke of Argyll, KT
- 1738–1739 Lt-Gen. Richard Onslow
- 1739–1740 Col. Robert Dalway
- 1740–1743 Brig-Gen. Samuel Walter Whitshed
- 1743–1752 Maj-Gen. Edward Richbell (also 17th Foot, 61st Foot)

=== 39th (East Middlesex) Regiment of Foot ===
- 1752–1766 Lt-Gen. John Adlercron
- 1766–1794 Gen. Sir Robert Boyd, KB
- 1794–1823 Gen. Nisbet Balfour (also 93rd Regiment of Foot (1793))

=== 39th (Dorsetshire) Regiment of Foot ===
- 1823–1833 Lt-Gen. Sir George Airey, KCH
- 1833–1840 Lt-Gen. Hon. Sir Robert O'Callaghan, GCB
- 1840–1852 Gen. Sir Frederick Philipse Robinson, GCB
- 1852–1853 Lt-Gen. George Burrell, CB
- 1853–1867 Gen. Sir Richard Lluellyn, KCB
- 1867–1881 Gen. Sir Charles van Straubenzee, GCB

== Sources ==
- Cannon, Richard (1853). Historical record of the Thirty-ninth, or the Dorsetshire Regiment of Foot: containing an account of the formation of the regiment in 1702, and of its subsequent services to 1853. Historical records of the British Army. Parker, Furnivall & Parker.
