= Harry Stubbs (musician) =

Harry Hearn Stubbs FRCM, FRCO (25 July 1892 – 4 July 1969) was a British classical musician, a longtime professor at the Royal College of Music, accompanist, organist, keyboardist, conductor, choirmaster and pedagogue.

== Early life and family ==
Harry Stubbs was born at Horseshoe Cloisters, Windsor Castle. Stubbs' father (also Harry Stubbs) and uncle (George Stubbs) were lay clerks at St George's Chapel, Windsor Castle; both of whom later worked at St Paul's Cathedral, London. His father and uncle had studied at the Royal College of Music (RCM) upon its establishment. In 1884 Stubbs’ father performed in the first Pupils’ Concert at the Royal College of Music. Both Stubbs' father and uncle participated in the choir for the coronations of Edward VII and George V. In addition the roles at St George's Chapel and St Paul's Cathedral, Stubbs' father worked as a soloist, performing at venues including the Great Hall of Goldsmiths' Institute and Royal Albert Hall.

== Education ==
In 1903, at the age of 10, Stubbs became a chorister at St Paul's Cathedral under organist Sir George Martin, attending the choir school. At the age of 14, upon leaving the choir school, he was elected to the Merchant Taylors' Company's Music Scholarship, and commenced his studies at the RCM. There, he studied organ with Sir Walter Parratt, piano with Frederic Cliffe, other studies with Charles Wood and Frederick Read; and choral studies with Sir Walford Davies. He achieved his ARCM for organ performance in 1912. After graduating Stubbs continued his studies with Frederick Sewell, whom had accompanied his father.

== Career ==
Stubbs was appointed organist and choirmaster at the Charterhouse Chapel in 1911 when he was only 18 years of age. In 1912 he gave the first performance of two organ preludes from Sixteen Preludes on Melodies from the English and Scottish Psalters composed by Charles Wood. Through Sewell's tutelage, Stubbs was given the opportunity to play accompaniments at the Royal Albert Hall for Landon Ronald concerts; where he accompanied Louise Kirkby Lunn, and Guido Ciccolini, amongst others.

Upon the outbreak of the First World War, Stubbs continued to perform; accompanying at the RCM and concerts for soldiers, including piano solos in the annual concert given by the Choir of St George's Chapel in 1915. When conscription was introduced in 1916, Stubbs was found to be medically unfit; and he joined the London Electrical Engineers.

Following the war Stubbs was in demand as an accompanist. He performed with artists such as Daisy Kennedy, Mischa Léon, Pauline Donalda, Frank Titterton, Dorothy Helmrich, and Dora Labbette. Stubbs accompanied Topliss Green on his single Because I Were Shy for Columbia Records. Bernard Shore recalled that Stubbs,

With his great gift for sensitive accompanying, insatiable study of the words of songs, and ability to transpose into any key, it was not surprising that he gradually got into the enviable roll of being the 'much wanted' accompanist, at the innumerable concerts and recitals when Wigmore (then Bechstein), Grotian, Steinway Halls were all in full swing. Carmen Hill and Daisy Kennedy were two particular artists who always played with him, and the three of them gave the second ever broadcast from Marconi House in the Strand, long before the days of the BBC and all that.

In 1925 Stubbs joined the teaching staff at the Royal College of Music teaching pianoforte accompaniment. Across his tenure at the RCM he also began to teach piano (solo); ear training and sight singing; composition, harmony, counterpoint; and repertoire for singers. Stubbs would go on to be a professor at the RCM for more than forty years. When he passed away, "it was in piano accompaniment and coaching in repertoire that his influence as a teacher was most felt".

In the late 1920s Stubbs moved to Barnes. By 1932 a choral society had been formed under his leadership. The concerts Stubbs conducted attracted soloist including Frederick Sharp and Marie Wilson. The year before the outbreak of the Second World War, Stubbs played the organ for Great National Jewish Demonstration Against Religious and Racial Persecution.

By late 1940, Stubbs was taking part in concerts organised by CEMA at rest centres and air raid shelters. The following year he deputized for Harold Darke's place at St Michael, Cornhill during the war. Between his teaching and various performance duties during the war he performed at Royal Albert Hall for Bach's St Matthew Passion under conductor Reginald Jacques, alongside Leon Goossens, The Jacques Orchestra, The Bach Choir and leading soloists including Peter Pears; and elsewhere Mendelssohn's Elijah with soloists including Keturah Sorrell and Roy Henderson.

Following the war Stubbs was in demand, playing organ in successive broadcast performances of Bach's Christmas Oratorio in 1946 with Kathleen Ferrier, Peter Pears and Norman Walker; and in 1947 with the New London Orchestra under conductor Steuart Wilson; Beethoven's Missa Solemnis with the BBC Chorus and BBC Symphony Orchestra under Sir Adrian Boult; programmes of Purcell with Elsie Suddaby, Alfred Deller, David Franklin, the Covent Garden Opera Chorus, The Boyd Neel Orchestra, under Boris Ord; and period music with Harold Darke; among many other engagements.

In 1948 Stubbs became the conductor of The Tudor Singers, a twelve voice ensemble founded by Cuthbert Bates and whose president was Ralph Vaughan Williams. In lieu of another work, Stubbs conducted The Tudor Singers in the first concert performance of Vaughan WIlliams’ The Souls of the Righteous at Wigmore Hall, London, that same year. The following year Stubbs prepared the Tudor Singers for the first private performances of Vaughan Williams' Fantasia (quasi variazione) on the "Old 104th Psalm Tune" and An Oxford Elergy. Stubbs conducted The Tudor Singers in the first performance of Five Choral Dances by Geoffrey Bush in 1952. Stubbs and the choir gave the first performance of Love came to me by John Gardner in 1954. Stubbs held the position of conductor for eight years.

Since before the war, Stubbs' wife, Margaret Bissett, had been an active member of the Society of Women Musicians. In 1943 Stubbs became an associate of the society. The couple hosted many of the society's recitals and events in their cottage.

In 1950 Stubbs was awarded an Honorary Fellowship of the Royal College of Music (FRCM).

== Personal life ==
In 1923 Stubbs became engaged to Margaret Bissett Robinson, one of the Charterhouse Singers; they married the following year at Charterhouse Chapel. Margaret Bissett was an eminent contralto, appointed professor at the Royal College of Music in 1965, retiring in 1975.

In 1966 Stubbs retired from the Royal College of Music. Following three years of waning health Harry Stubbs died on 4 July 1969 in London. Bernard Shore penned a four-page obituary in The Royal College of Music Magazine. The Society of Women Musicians recorded their "sense of loss at the passing of Harry Stubbs for so long a staunch supporter of the Society". A memorial service was held on 6 October 1969 at Holy Sepulchre, London. Known as the Musicians' Church, Holy Sepulchre contains the Musicians’ Chapel, where Stubbs name was inscribed in the Book of Remembrance, a kneeler in his memory was placed, and a fanfare especially composed by Stubbs is embroidered on the cushions in the Mayor's pew.
