= William Newton (British Army officer) =

Brigadier-General William Newton
- Died: 10 November 1730

Brigadier-General William Newton (died 10 November 1730) was an officer of the British Army.

== Career ==
Newton was commissioned as a lieutenant in the 1st Regiment of Foot Guards, with the rank of captain in the Army, on 9 November 1692. He served in the wars of King William III, and was wounded at the siege of Namur in 1695. On 13 February 1702 he was appointed major of Sir Richard Temple's newly raised Regiment of Foot, and served in the wars of Queen Anne, being promoted to lieutenant-colonel commanding the regiment on 25 August 1704, brevet colonel on 1 January 1707, and colonel of the regiment on 24 April 1710.

On 22 July 1715 Newton was made colonel of a newly raised regiment of dragoons, and on 28 September 1722 he transferred to the colonelcy of the regiment later numbered the 39th Regiment of Foot. He was promoted to brigadier-general on 4 March 1727, while serving with his regiment at the thirteenth siege of Gibraltar.

Military offices
Preceded by Sir Richard Temple	Colonel of Newton's Regiment of Foot; 1710–1713	Succeeded by Regiment disbanded
Preceded by Thomas Ferrers	Colonel of Newton's Regiment of Foot; 1722–1730	Succeeded by John Cope
