= HMS Experiment (1689) =

History

England
- Name: HMS Experiment
- Ordered: 28 June 1689
- Builder: Royal Dockyard, Chatham
- Launched: 17 December 1689
- Commissioned: 1690
- Fate: Breaking completed at Portsmouth in July 1738

General characteristics
- Type: 32-gun fifth rate
- Tons burthen: 3712/94 bm
- Length: 105 ft 0 in (32.0 m) gundeck; 92 ft 0 in (28.0 m) keel for tonnage
- Beam: 27 ft 6 in (8.4 m) for tonnage
- Depth of hold: 10 ft 6 in (3.2 m)
- Sail plan: ship-rigged
- Complement: as fifth rate 145/100; as sixth rate 115/85
- Armament: as built; 4 × 4 demi-culverines on wooden trucks (LD); 20 × sakers on wooden trucks (UD); 4 × 4 minions on wooden trucks (QD); 1703 Establishment; 4 × 4 9-pdr guns on wooden trucks (LD); 22/20 × 6-pdr guns on wooden trucks (UD); 6/4 × 4-pdr guns on wooden trucks (QD); as sixth rate; 20/18 6-pdrs on wooden trucks (UD)

General characteristics as rebuilt 1727
- Type: 20-gun Sixth Rate
- Tons burthen: 374 66/94 bm
- Length: 106 ft 0 in (32.3 m) gundeck; 87 ft 9 in (26.7 m) keel for tonnage
- Beam: 28 ft 4 in (8.6 m) for tonnage
- Depth of hold: 9 ft 2 in (2.8 m)
- Sail plan: ship-rigged
- Armament: 20 × 6-pdr 19 cwt guns on wooden trucks (UD)

HMS Experiment was a fifth rate built under the 1689 programme built at Deptford Dockyard. Her guns were listed under old terms for guns as demi-culverines, (Note: A demi-culverine was a gun of 3,400 pounds with a four-inch bore firing a 9.5-pound shot with an eight-pound powder charge.) sakers (Note: A sacar or saker was a gun of 1,400 pounds with a 3.5-inch bore firing a 5.5-pound shot with a 5.5-pound powder charge.) and minions. (Note: A minion was a gun of 1,000 pounds with a 3.5-inch bore firing a 4-pound shot with a 4-pound powder charge.) After commissioning she spent her career in Home Waters, North America, Mediterranean and the West Indies. She was reduced to a 20-gun sixth rate in 1717 then rebuilt as a 1719 Establishment sixth rate in 1724. Her breaking was finally completed at Portsmouth in 1738.

Experiment was the third named vessel since it was used for a double-hulled sloop built in 1664 and lost in 1687.

== Construction ==
She was ordered on 28 June 1689 from Chatham Dockyard to be built under the guidance of Master Shipwright Robert Lee. She was launched on 17 December 1689.

== Commissioned service ==
She was commissioned in 1690 under the command of Captain John Jennings, RN for service in America. Captain Thomas Heathe, RN took command in 1692 for service with the Fleet. In January Captain James Greenaway, RN was in command with Wheeler's squadron in the West Indies. Captain Michael Wilkins took command in February 1694, but died on 16 August, then Captain David Lloyd, RN took command at Jamaica.In 1695 Captain James Lawrence was her commander until he died on 15 September 1695. In May 1697, Captain John Lapthorne, RN was her commander in Home Waters followed by Captain Trevor Tudor, RN in 1698 for the Mediterranean followed by a stint in Newfoundland in 1700. In 1701 Captain Richard Paul, RN took command for Whetstone's squadron in the West Indies. With the death of Captain Paul on 17 March 1703, Captain William Russel until his death on 30 June 1703. Captain Humphrey Pudner, RN took command. Captain William Jamesson took command until his death, then Captain John Williams, RN took over in September 1706.

In January 1707 Captain Robert Bowler, RN took command at Jamaica, followed by Captain Charles Adamson, RN who died on 27 February 1708. Captain Robert Johnson, RN took command after Captain Adamson died, then in February 1708 Captain Robert Studley, RN took command with Admiral Byng's Fleet at the Downs. In November 1708 Captain James Hemmington, RN was with Mighells's squadron in the North Sea. June 1709 she was under Captain Charles Hardy, RN then Captain Hemmington took command again in November 1709 for service in the English Channel and later onto Portugal. She took privateer, La Decouverte on 24 August 1710. In March 1711 Captain Mathew Elford, RN was in command for service in North America and Jamaica. She took the privateer, La Dame de Lazire on 1 June 1711. In December 1712 she was sent to Motherbank to look after the quarantine ships. In 1713 she was in Home Waters for 'owling'. She underwent a great repair at Portsmouth between April and August 1713 at a cost of £25,847.18.9d. (Note: A total cost accounting for inflation of approximately £4,364,600 in today's money.) She was paid off in December 1714. She was reduced to a 20-gun sixth rate at Plymouth costing £1,450.6.43/4d (Note: A total cost accounting for inflation of approximately £245,000 in today's money.) in July 1717.

== Commissioned Service as a Sixth Rate ==
She recommissioned under Captain Edmund Hooke, RN for service at Sale, Morocco in 1718. In June 1719 her commander was Captain William Davies, RN and remained at Sale. She was docked at Plymouth on 20 March 1724 for dismantling and preparation for rebuilding.

== Rebuild to 1719 Establishment Sixth Rate 1724 - 1727 ==
She was ordered to be rebuilt on 12 April and again on 27 April 1727 at Plymouth Dockyard under the guidance of Master Shipwright Peirson Lock. Her keel was laid in March and launched on 1 November 1727. The dimensions after rebuild were gundeck 106 feet 0 inches (32.3 metres) with a keel length of 87 feet 9 inches (26.7 metres) for tonnage calculation. The breadth would be 28 feet 4 inches (8.6 metres) with a depth of hold of 9 ft 2 in (2.8 m). The tonnage calculation would be 37466/94 tons. The gun armament as established in 1713 would be twenty 6-pounder 19 hundredweight (cwt) guns mounted on wooden trucks. She was completed for sea in 1728 at a cost of £3,895. (Note: A total cost accounting for inflation of approximately £686,600 in today's money.)

== Commissioned Service After 1727 Rebuild ==
She was commissioned in January 1728 under the command of Captain Henry Reddish, RN for cruising off Newfoundland. She returned Home and paid off in September 1731. She underwent a middling repair at Plymouth costing £2,487.10.7d (Note: A total cost accounting for inflation of approximately £499,700 in today's money.) in November 1731. She was recommissioned in 1732 under the command of Captain John StLo, RN for service in the West Indies. She returned Home and paid off in August 1732.

== Disposition ==
Her breaking was completed at Portsmouth in July 1738.
