= London Charterhouse =

The Charterhouse, London
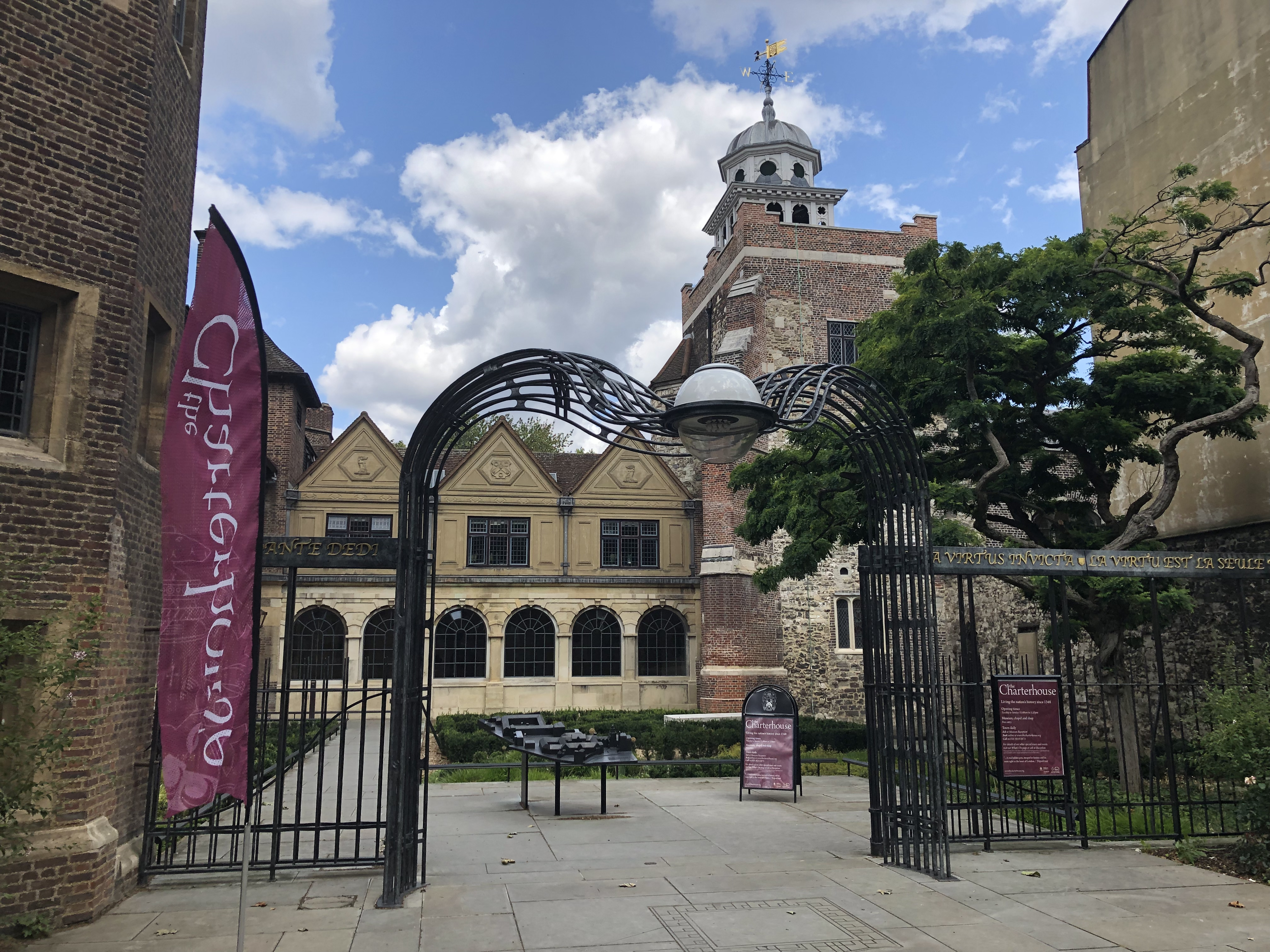
- Entrance from Charterhouse Square

- Location of the Charterhouse in Central London
- 51°31′17″N 0°06′00″W
- Type: Almshouse
- Location: Islington

History
- Built: 1371–1951

Site notes
- Area: London
- Governing body: Charitable trust

Listed Building – Grade I
- Official name: The Charterhouse, Charterhouse Square
- Designated: 29 December 1950
- Reference no.: 1298101

The London Charterhouse is a historic complex of buildings in Clerkenwell, London, dating from the 14th century. It occupies land to the north of Charterhouse Square, and lies within the London Borough of Islington. It was originally built as (and takes its name from) a Carthusian priory, founded in 1371 on the site of a Black Death burial ground. Following the priory's dissolution in 1537, it was rebuilt from 1545 onwards to become one of the great courtyard houses of Tudor London. In 1611, the property was bought by Thomas Sutton, a businessman and "the wealthiest commoner in England", who established a school for the young and an almshouse for the old. The almshouse remains in occupation today, while the school was re-located in 1872 to Godalming, Surrey.

Although substantial fragments survive from the monastic period, most of the standing buildings date from the Tudor era. Thus, today the complex "conveys a vivid impression of the type of large rambling 16th-century mansion that once existed all round London".

== History ==
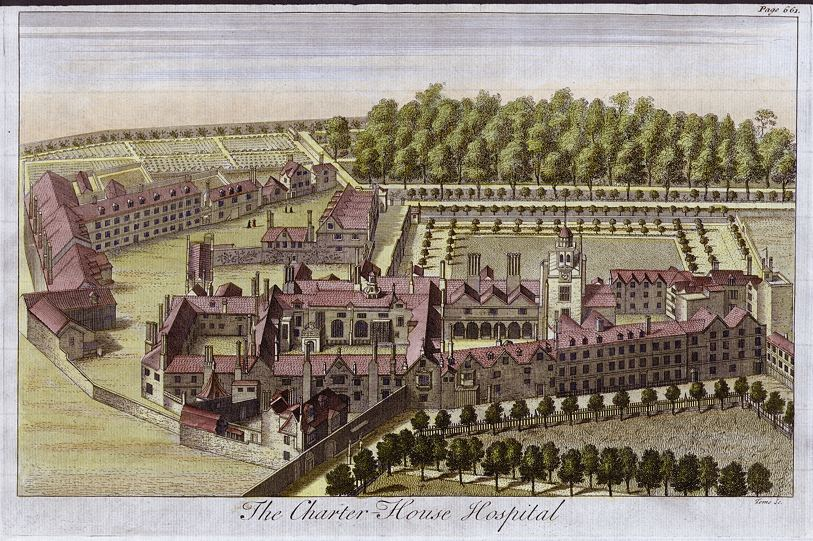
The Charterhouse in 1770

=== Priory ===
In 1348, Walter Manny rented 13 acres (5.3 ha) of land in Spital Croft, north of Long Lane, from the Master and Brethren of St Bartholomew's Hospital for a graveyard and plague pit for victims of the Black Death. A chapel and hermitage were constructed, renamed New Church Haw; in 1371, however, this land was granted for the foundation of a Carthusian monastery under called "The House of the Salutation of the Mother of God". In English, a Carthusian monastery is called a "Charterhouse" (derived from the Grande Chartreuse, the original monastery of the order), and thus the Carthusian monastery in London was referred to as the "London Charterhouse." As per Carthusian custom, the twenty-five monks each had their own small building and garden. Thomas More came to the monastery for spiritual recuperation.

The monastery was closed in 1537, in the Dissolution of the Monasteries during the English Reformation. As they refused to affirm Henry VIII's claim to be Head of the Church, the members of the community were treated harshly. The Prior, John Houghton was hanged, drawn and quartered at Tyburn, and ten monks were taken to the nearby Newgate Prison. Nine of these men were starved to death, and the tenth was executed three years later at Tower Hill. They constitute the group known as the Carthusian Martyrs of London.

=== Tudor mansion ===
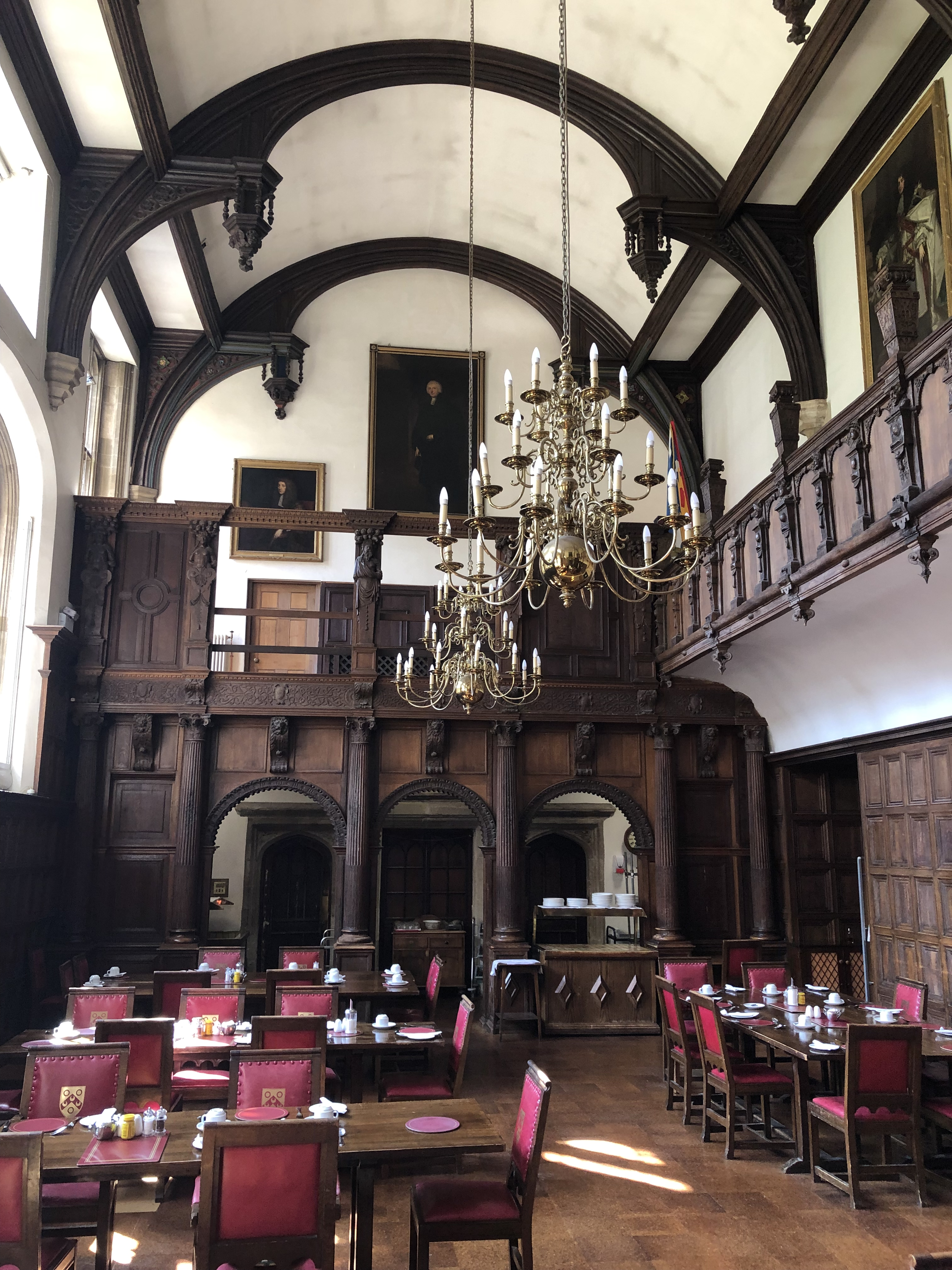
The Great Hall

For several years after the dissolution of the priory, members of the Bassano family of instrument makers were amongst the tenants of the former monks' cells, whilst Henry VIII stored hunting equipment in the church. In 1545, the entire site was bought by Sir Edward (later Lord) North (c. 1496–1564), who transformed the complex into a luxurious mansion house. North demolished the church and built the Great Hall and adjoining Great Chamber. In 1558, during North's occupancy, Elizabeth I used the house during the preparations for her coronation.

Following North's death, the property was purchased by Thomas Howard, 4th Duke of Norfolk, who renamed it Howard House. In 1570, following his imprisonment in the Tower of London for scheming to marry Mary, Queen of Scots, Norfolk was placed under house arrest at the Charterhouse. He occupied his time by embellishing the house, and built a long terrace in the garden (which survives as the "Norfolk Cloister") leading to a tennis court. In 1571, Norfolk's involvement in the Ridolfi plot was exposed after a ciphered letter from Mary was discovered under a doormat in the house; he was executed the following year.

The property passed to Norfolk's son, Thomas Howard, 1st Earl of Suffolk. During his occupancy, James I held court there for three days on his first entrance into London in 1603.

=== Almshouse and school ===
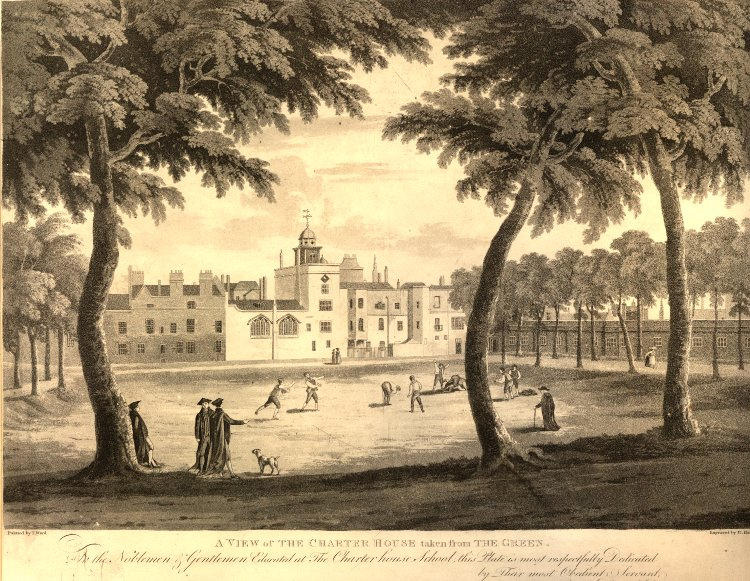
A View of the Charter House taken from the Green, 1813

In May 1611 it came into the hands of Thomas Sutton (1532–1611) of Knaith, Lincolnshire. He was appointed Master of Ordnance in Northern Parts, and acquired a fortune by the discovery of coal on two estates which he had leased near Newcastle upon Tyne, and later, upon moving to London, he carried on a commercial career. Before he died on 12 December of that year, he endowed a hospital on the site of the Charterhouse, calling it the Hospital of King James; and in his will he bequeathed money to maintain a chapel, hospital (almshouse) and school.

In the Case of Sutton's Hospital, his will was hotly contested but upheld in court, meaning the foundation was constituted to afford a home for eighty male pensioners ("gentlemen by descent and in poverty, soldiers that have borne arms by sea or land, merchants decayed by piracy or shipwreck, or servants in household to the King or Queens Majesty"), and to educate forty boys.

Charterhouse early established a reputation for excellence in hospital care and treatment, thanks in part to Henry Levett, M.D., an Oxford graduate who joined the school as physician in 1712. Levett was widely esteemed for his medical writings, including an early tract on the treatment of smallpox. He was buried in Charterhouse Chapel, and his widow married Andrew Tooke, the master of Charterhouse.

The school, Charterhouse School, developed beyond the original intentions of its founder, to become a well-regarded public school. In 1872, under the headmastership of Rev. William Haig Brown, the school moved to new buildings in the parish of Godalming in Surrey, opening on 18 June.

=== Twentieth century ===
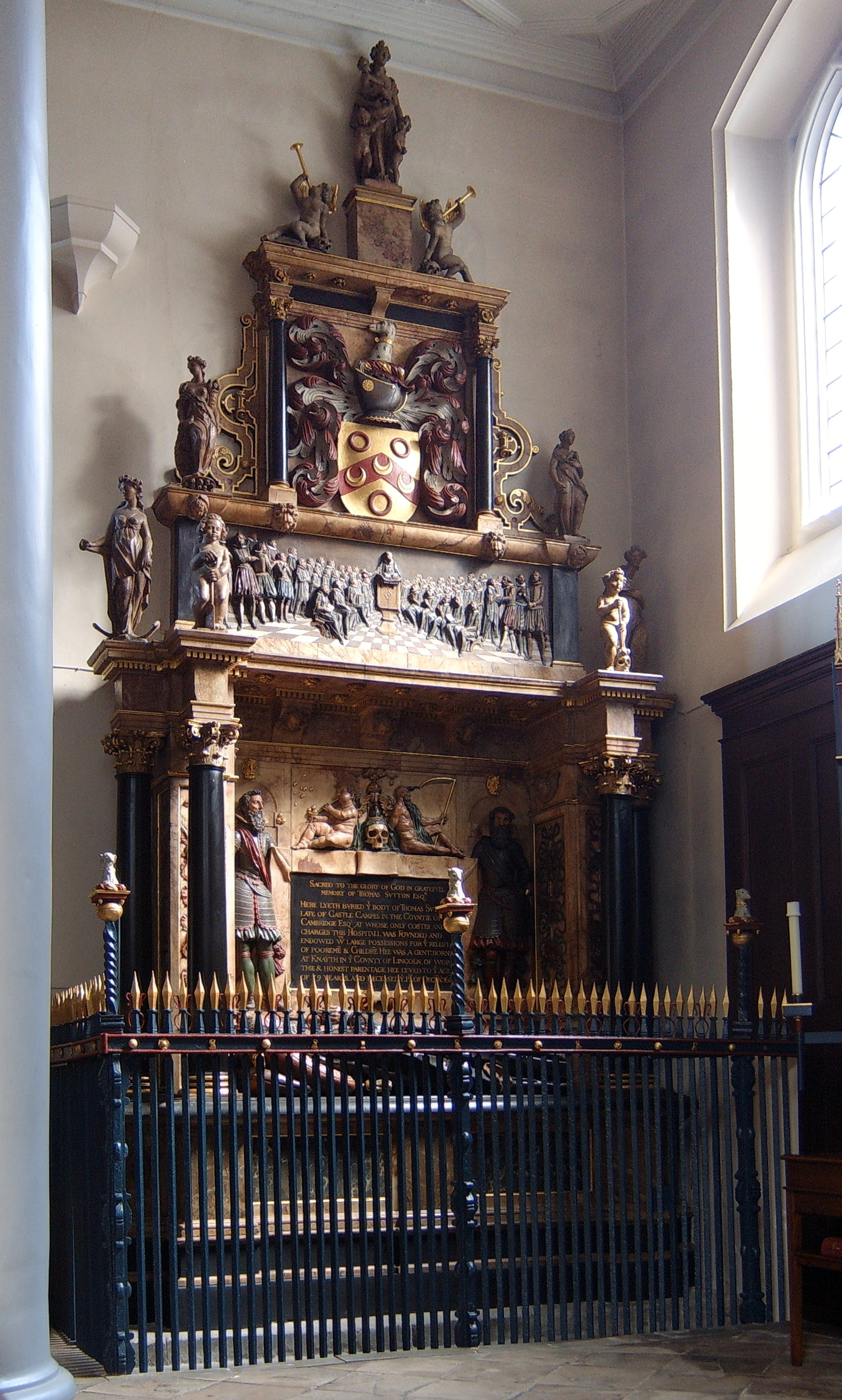
Tomb of Thomas Sutton

Following the departure of Charterhouse School, its buildings, on the site of the former monastic great cloister, were taken over by Merchant Taylors' School, until that moved out in turn in 1933 to a new site near Northwood, Hertfordshire. The school buildings then became home to the St Bartholomew's Hospital Medical School, and (though now much redeveloped) remain one of the sites occupied by its successor, Barts and The London School of Medicine and Dentistry. The main part of the cloister garth continues to be a well-tended site mostly laid to lawn in the quadrangle of the university site.

The principal historic buildings of the Charterhouse were severely damaged by enemy action on the night of 10–11 May 1941, during the Blitz. The great hall and great chamber were severely damaged, the great staircase totally destroyed and the four sides of the Master's Court burnt out. These were restored between 1950 and 1959 by the architectural firm of Seely & Paget, a rebuilding which allowed the exposure and embellishment of some medieval and much 16th- and 17th-century fabric that had previously been concealed or obscured.

In preparation for and in conjunction with the restoration project, archaeological investigations were carried out by W. F. Grimes, which led to a greatly enhanced understanding of the layout of the monastic buildings, and the discovery of the remains of Walter de Manny, the founder, buried in a lead coffin before the high altar of the monastic chapel. These remains were identified as Manny's beyond reasonable doubt by the presence in the coffin of a lead bulla (seal) of Pope Clement VI: in 1351 Clement had granted Manny a licence to select his own deathbed confessor, a document that would have been issued with just such a bulla attached.

Charterhouse continues to serve as an almshouse to over 40 older people, known as Brothers, who are in need of financial and companionship support. Since 2017 women have been accepted as Brothers, and the site has been open for pre-booked guided tours; and it is free to view the chapel and museum with chapel services open to the public.

=== Revealing the Charterhouse ===
In partnership with the Museum of London the Charterhouse opened the site to the public in 2017. There are three key elements: a museum, which tells the story of the Charterhouse from the Black Death to the present day; a Learning Room and Learning Programme so that school groups can discover how the Charterhouse has been home to everyone from monks and monarchs to schoolboys and Brothers; and a landscaped Charterhouse Square, open to the public so that people can enjoy the green surroundings. Works for this project were completed and opened to the public in January 2017.

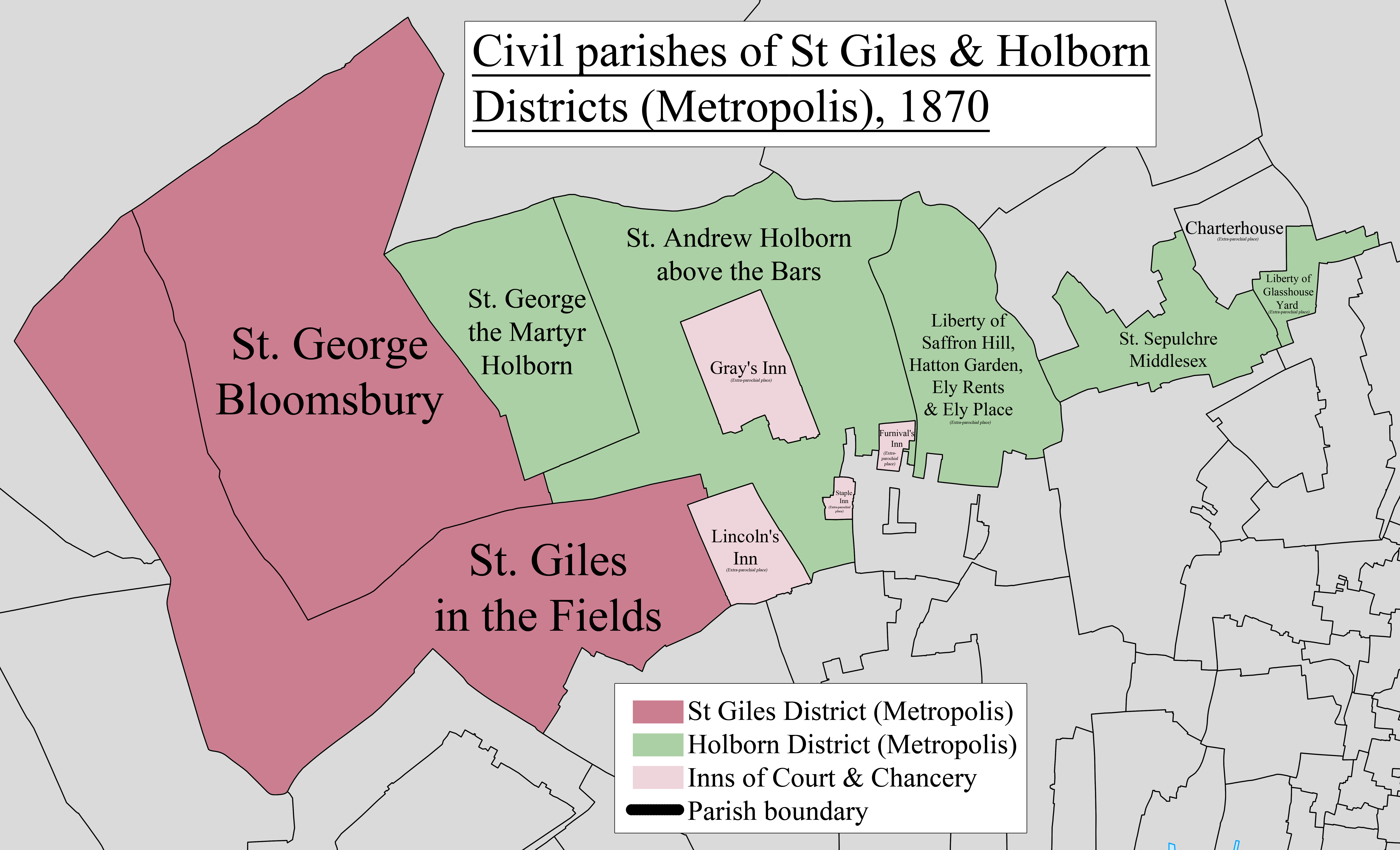
Civil parish of Charterhouse (upper right) in the late 19th century. Neighbouring parishes were at that time grouped into Districts, such as St Giles (red) and Holborn (green).

== Local government ==
Charterhouse was an extra-parochial area, an area lying outside any of the ancient parish units from which London's modern administrative units evolved through a succession of mergers. It was not included in one of the districts – groupings of civil parishes, brought together for local government purposes – under the Metropolis Management Act 1855. In 1858, following the Extra-Parochial Places Act 1857 (20 Vict. c. 19), it effectively became a civil parish for all purposes, with the provision that it would not form part of any poor law union, but later became a component of the Holborn Poor Law Union from 1877 until 1900.

In 1900 it became part of the Metropolitan Borough of Finsbury, and was abolished as a separate civil parish in 1915. Since 1965 it has been part of the London Borough of Islington in Greater London.

== Nearby stations ==
The nearest tube station is Barbican but Farringdon tube and surface rail station is also close.

== Masters of Charterhouse ==
List of Masters of Charterhouse since 1611.

- 1611–1614: John Hutton
- 1614–1615: Andrew Perne
- 1615–1617: Peter Hooker
- 1617–1624: Francis Beaumont, appointed by the King
- 1624–1637: Sir Robert Dallington
- 1637–1650: George Garrard
- 1650–1660: Edward Cressett
- 1660–1671: Sir Ralph Sydenham
- 1671–1677: Martin Clifford
- 1677–1685: William Erskine
- 1685–1715: Thomas Burnet
- 1715–1737: John King
- 1737–1753: Nicholas Mann
- 1753–1761: Philip Bearcroft
- 1761–1778: Samuel Salter
- 1778–1804: William Ramsden
- 1804–1842: Philip Fisher
- 1842–1870: William Hale Hale
- 1872–1885: George Currey
- 1885–1897: Richard Elwyn
- 1897–1907: William Haig Brown
- 1907–1908: George Edward Jelf
- 1908–1927: Gerald Stanley Davies
- 1927–1935: William Thomas Baring Hayter
- 1935–1954: Edward StG. Schomberg
- 1954–1961: John McLeod Campbell
- 1962–1973: Thomas Nevill
- 1973–1984: Oliver van Oss
- 1984–1996: Eric Harrison
- 1996–2001: Professor James Malpas
- 2001–2012: Dr James Thomson
- 2012–2017: Brigadier Charlie Hobson
- 2017–2022: Ann Kenrick
- 2022–present: Peter Aiers

== Organists of Charterhouse ==
- 1626–1643: Benjamin Cosyn
- 1662–1737: Nicholas Love and Thomas Love
- 1737–1752: Johann Christoph Pepusch
- 1753–1796: John Jones
- 1796–1837: R.J.S. Stevens
- 1838–1858: William Horsley
- 1858–1884: John Pyke Hullah
- 1884–1911: Mary Taylor
- 1911–????: Harry Stubbs
- 2004–2024: Graham Matthews
- 2024–present: Zosia Herlihy-O'Brien

== Gallery ==
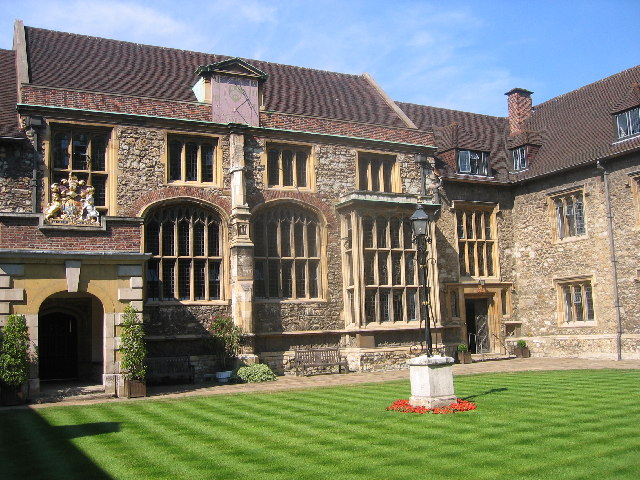
The Great Hall viewed from Master's Court

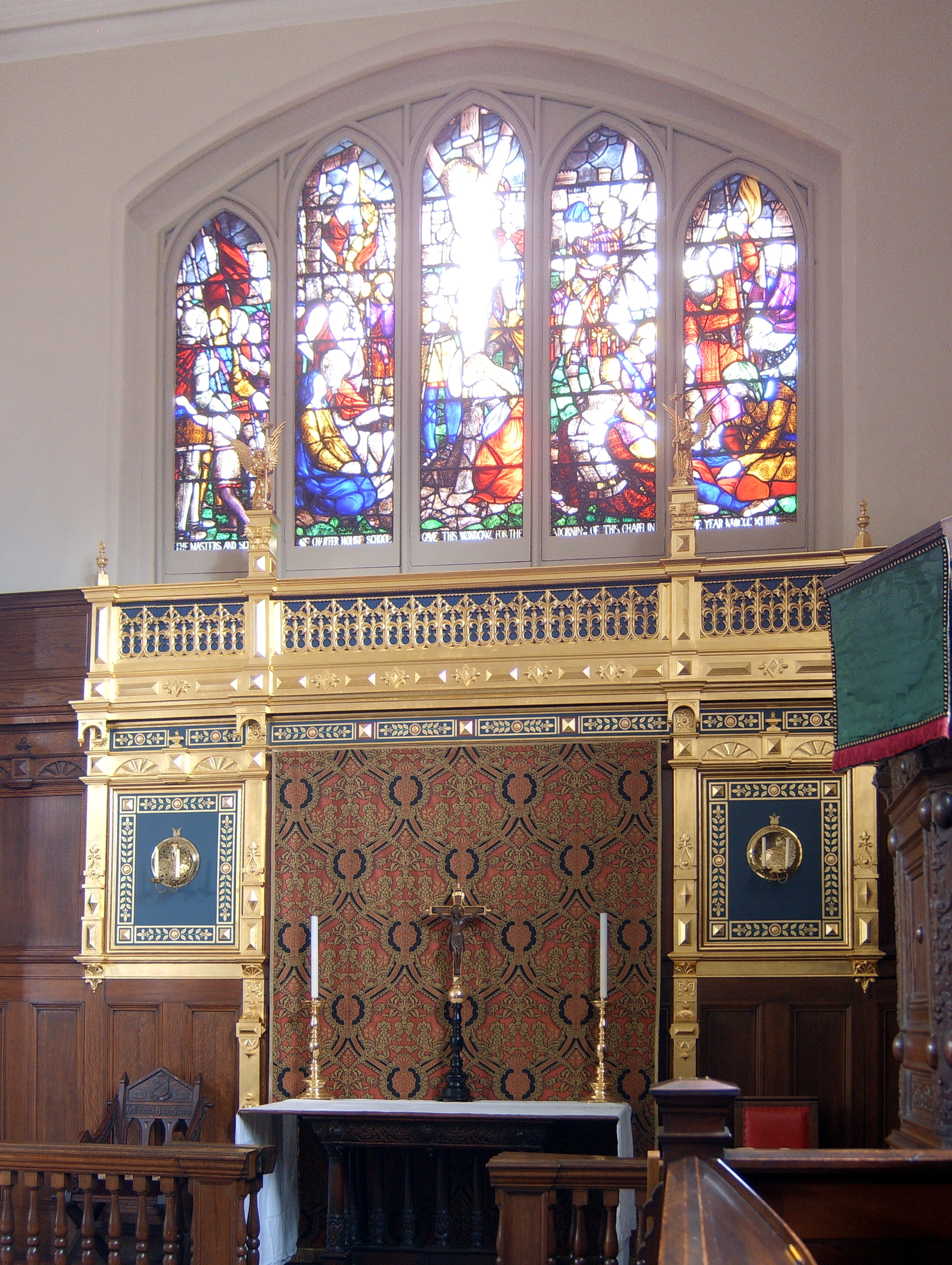
Altar in the south aisle of the Chapel

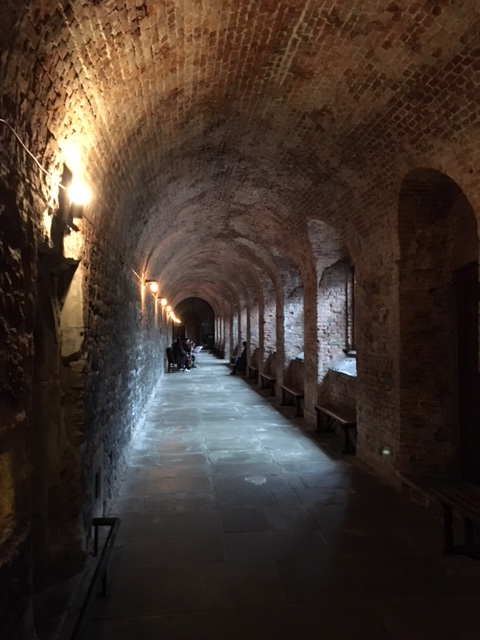
The cloister

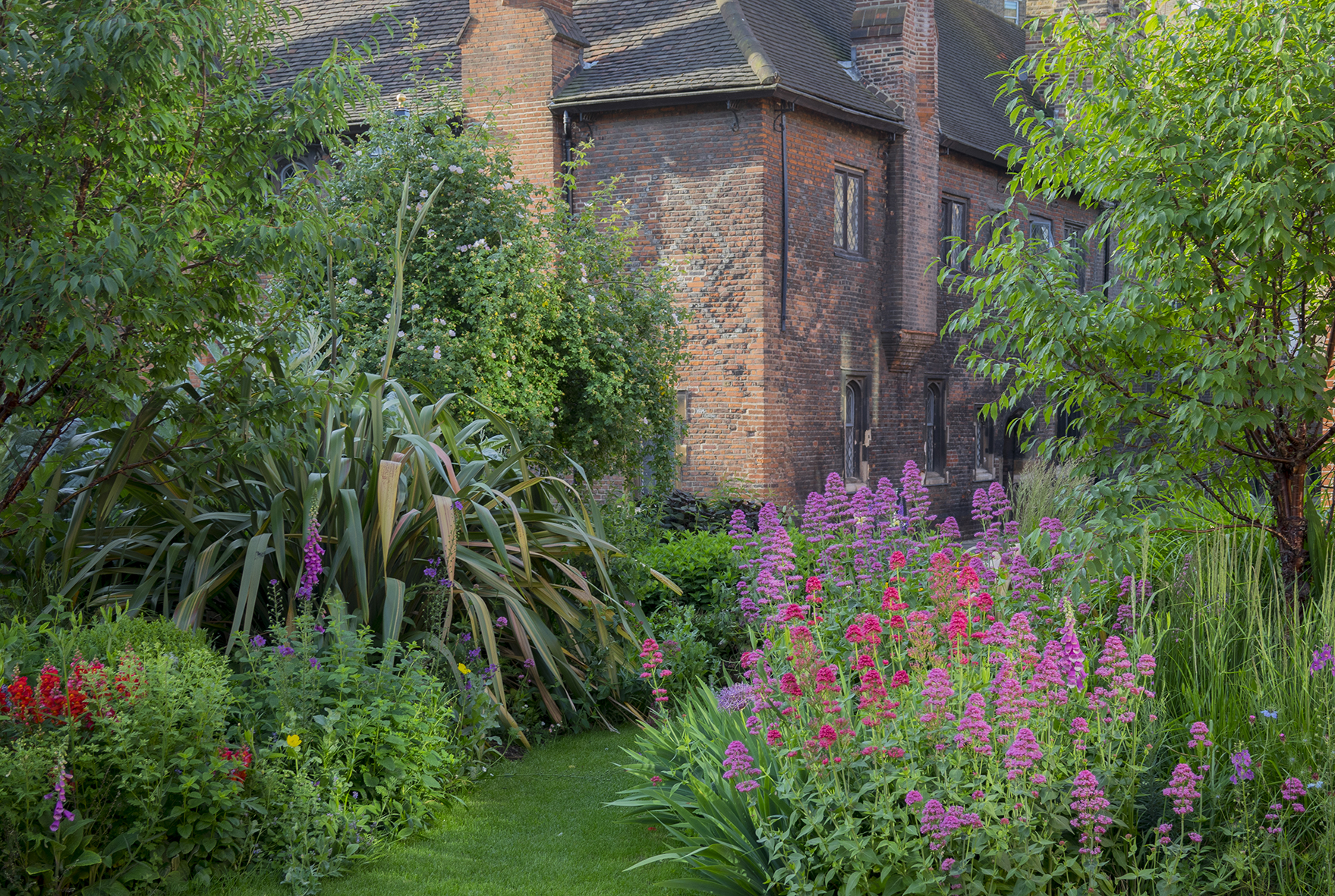
View of the Charterhouse from the gardens

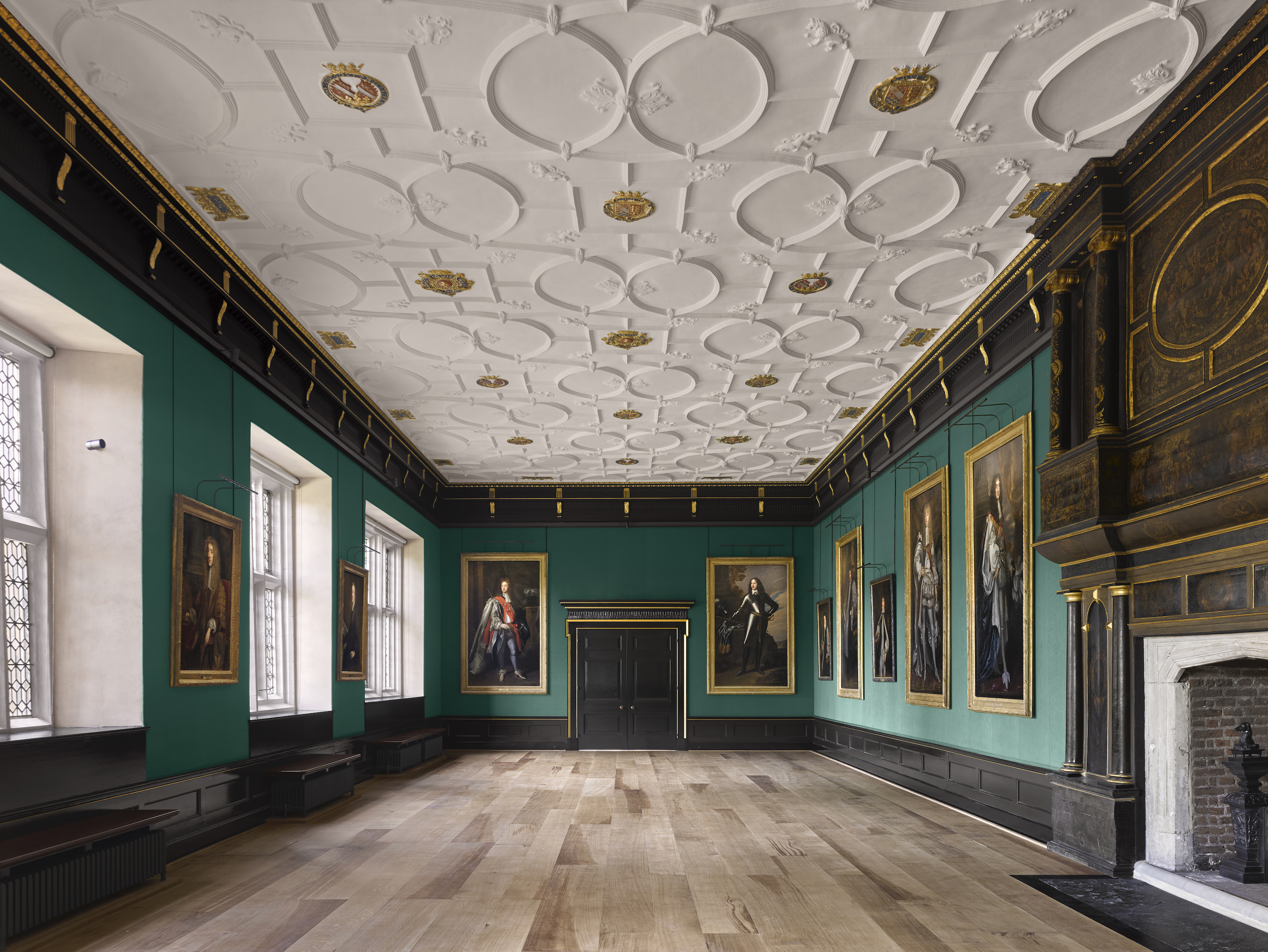
The newly refurbished Great Chamber

== See also ==
- List of Carthusian monasteries
- Forty Martyrs of England and Wales
- Carthusian Martyrs

== Sources ==
- Cherry, Bridget; Pevsner, Nikolaus (1998). London 4: North. The Buildings of England. London: Penguin. ISBN 0-14-071049-3.
- Davies, Gerald S. (1922). Charterhouse in London: monastery, mansion, hospital, school. London: John Murray.
- Knowles, David; Grimes, W. F. (1954). Charterhouse: the medieval foundation in the light of recent discoveries. London: Longmans, Green & Co.
- Oswald, Arthur (1959). The London Charterhouse Restored. London: Country Life.
- Porter, Stephen (2009). The London Charterhouse: a history of Thomas Sutton's Charity. Stroud: Amberley. ISBN 9781848680906.
- Roper, W. J. D. (1847). Chronicles of Charter-House. London.
- Ross, Cathy (2016b). The Charterhouse: the Guidebook. London: D. Giles Ltd. ISBN 978-1-907804-97-7.
