= Abercrombie Caves =

Caves in New South Wales, Australia

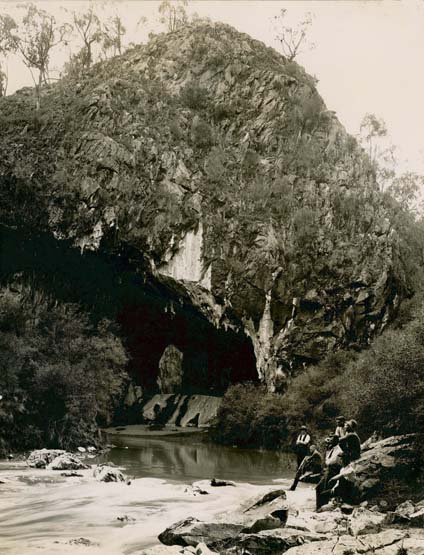
- Entrance to Abercrombie Caves, undated.
- Interactive map of Abercrombie Caves
- Location: Bathurst, New South Wales, Australia
- Coordinates: 33.91144°S 149.35938°E
- Discovery: 1842 – W. R. Davidson
- Geology: Limestone
- Access: No access - closed until 30 September 2025
- Show cave length: 221 m (725 ft)
- Features: The Archway – the largest natural arch in the southern hemisphere. Other considerable features at the site include; King Solomon's Temple, Belfry Cave, Cathedral Cave, Grove Cave, and the Bushranger's Cave.
- Website: Abercrombie Caves at NSW NPWS

Abercrombie Karst Conservation Reserve
- IUCN category III (natural monument or feature)
- Location within New South Wales
- Location: New South Wales
- Nearest city: Bathurst
- Coordinates: 33°54′41.18″S 149°21′33.77″E
- Area: 14.34 km^{2} (5.54 sq mi)
- Established: December 1997
- Governing body: Jenolan Caves Reserve Trust; NSW National Parks & Wildlife Service
- Website: Official website

The Abercrombie Caves, contained within the Abercrombie Karst Conservation Reserve, are a series of limestone arch caves that are located in the Central West region of New South Wales, Australia. The caves are renowned for their karst qualities, namely the formation that has been eroded by water action that has developed from a sinkhole to become a blind valley. Several good examples of crayback formations exist in both entrances.

The 1,434-hectare (3,540-acre) reserve is situated 75 kilometres (47 mi) south of Bathurst and 125 kilometres (78 mi) north of Goulburn, near the small village of Trunkey Creek. The caves are registered as a natural heritage site on the Register of the National Estate for its large diversity of karst morphological and sedimentological features. Camping in the reserve is permitted, with sixty campground sites and two cottages. The caves are open seven days a week during school holidays; and closed on Monday and Tuesday during school terms.

== Features and Caves ==
The most popular feature of the Abercrombie Caves is The Archway – the largest natural arch in the southern hemisphere. Within The Archway cave is the gold miners dance platform built in January 1880 by gold miners, replacing a platform built in the 1860s, the 1880s platform is still used for performances to this day including the annual Carols in the Caves performance.

Other considerable caves at the site include; King Solomon's Temple, Belfry Cave, Cathedral Cave, Grove Cave, and the Bushranger's Cave.

The Belfry Cave is another popular cave at the site which has an extremely high roof chamber, a suspension bridge, ladders and tight squeezes.

The Grove Cave is a challenging guided tour at Abercrombie Caves made up of tight narrow passages, high ceilings and white walls.

The Bushranger's Cave/King Solomon's Temple is named for the bushrangers who roamed the rugged Abercrombie Ranges in 1830, and used the cave as a shelter. The cave was once used by the notorious Ribbon Gang, made up of escaped convicts and led by young English convict-servant Ralph Entwistle. The cave's remote location and narrow passages meant it was an ideal place for the gang to hide out. Inside his cave, visitors can also visit King Solomon's Temple chamber, crossing a suspension bridge to reach it.

== History ==
It is believed that a tourist party visited the caves in 1834 but the Caves were not "officially" discovered until 1842 by Surveyor W. R. Davidson. Surveyor Wells discovered the Koh-i-noor, Bushranger, Long Tunnel, and Cathedral caves and the Hall of Terpsichore (The Dance Hall) in 1843. Explorer William Wentworth and Governor Charles Fitzroy visited Abercrombie Caves in 1844.

It is believed that various bushrangers used the caves as a hideout during the 1800s. The earliest known is the Ribbon Gang who used the caves in 1830.

Gold was discovered in the area in 1854. A gold exploration community was established at Mount Gray, just above the caves. Miners from many of the surrounding communities would often visit the caves for recreation.

The caves were originally known as Burragylong Caverns and during the mining period they became known as Abercrombie caves.

Vandalism occurred in the early days when many pieces of white marble were carted away by the visitors as souvenirs and the miners damaged many of the formations by firing rifles at them. Some graffiti name carvings can still be seen inside the caves from the 19th century period.

== Other information/Summary ==
All caves at Abercrombie Caves are guided. Visitors who wish to visit the caves will need to join a tour to be admitted inside.

- Archway Cave Tour
- Suitable for all ages. The tour is a 1.4 km walk, with 202 steps, and takes about 1 hour.
- Belfry Cave Tour
- Grade: Hard.
- Grove Cave Tour
- Grade: Hard. Suitable for adults and children 7 years and over. Not suitable for children under 7 years. The tour takes about 45 minutes. Cost: Adult $24 per person. Senior $21 per person. Pensioner/child $18 per person. Family $60 for 2 adults and 2 children.
- Bushranger's Cave/King Solomon's Temple Tour
- Grade: Medium. Suitable for adults and school-age children. The tour includes moderate walk, climbing down a step ladder and crossing a suspension bridge. It takes about 1 hr 40mins.

== See also ==
- List of caves in New South Wales
- Protected areas of New South Wales
