= Charles Brown (Royal Navy officer) =

Royal Navy officer (c. 1678 – 1753)

Captain Charles Brown
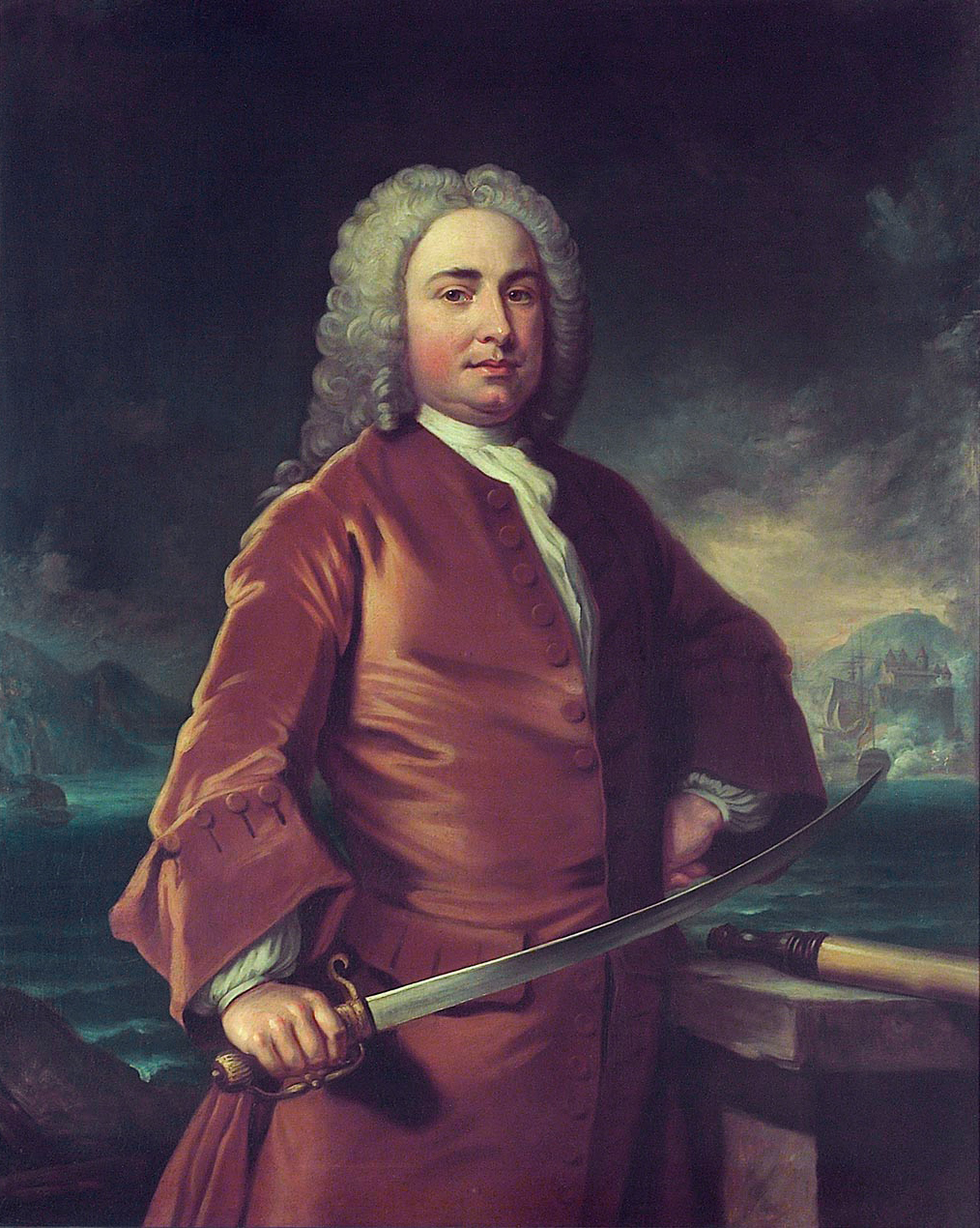
- Brown, c. 1740
- Born: c. 1678
- Died: 23 March 1753 (aged 74–75)
- Military career
- Allegiance: Great Britain
- Branch: Royal Navy
- Service years: c.1695–1753
- Rank: Captain
- Commands: HMS Strombolo; HMS York; HMS Advice; HMS Oxford; HMS Buckingham; HMS Hampton Court
- Conflicts: Nine Years' War; War of the Spanish Succession; War of the Quadruple Alliance; Anglo-Spanish War; Siege of Gibraltar; War of Jenkins' Ear; Battle of Porto Bello; War of the Austrian Succession

Captain Charles Brown (c. 1678 – 23 March 1753) was a Royal Navy officer. He saw service during the Nine Years' War, and the Wars of the Spanish Succession, Quadruple Alliance and Austrian Succession.

Brown entered the navy in about 1695, through the patronage of Sir George Byng, afterwards Lord Torrington. He was appointed captain of HMS Strombolo in 1709. He commanded HMS York in 1717, and HMS Advice in 1726 in the cruises up the Baltic Sea. In 1727, during the siege of Gibraltar by the Spaniards, he commanded HMS Oxford, and in 1731 HMS Buckingham in the Mediterranean. In 1738 he was appointed to command HMS Hampton Court, and was senior officer at this station until the arrival of Admiral Edward Vernon in the following year.

His opportunity arrived in 1739, when, during the War of Jenkins' Ear, he served under Vernon in the attack on Portobello, in the isthmus of Darien. He led the squadron into Boca Chica, placing his vessel, the Hampton Court, alongside the strongest part of the fortifications. When the fortress surrendered, the Spanish governor presented his sword in token of submission. Brown very properly declined to receive it, saying he was but 'second in command,' and took the governor in his boat to Admiral Vernon. But the Spaniard was obstinate, declaring that but for the insupportable fire of the commodore he never would have yielded. Thereupon Vernon, very handsomely turning to Brown, presented to him the sword, which is still in the possession of his descendants. In 1741 Brown was appointed to the office of commissioner of the navy at Chatham, a situation which he held with unblemished reputation until his death, on 23 March 1753. His daughter, Lucy, became the wife of Admiral William Parry, commander-in-chief of the Leeward Islands; and her daughter and namesake married Captain William Locker, under whom Lord Nelson served in his early days, and who subsequently became lieutenant-governor of Greenwich Hospital. There was a portrait of Brown in the Painted Hall at Greenwich, which subsequently passed in the hands of the successor institution, the National Maritime Museum.
