= Edward St Lo =

Royal Navy officer

Rear-Admiral Edward St Lo
- Died: 14 April 1729
- Military career
- Allegiance: Kingdom of Great Britain
- Branch: Royal Navy
- Rank: Rear-Admiral
- Commands: HMS Pendennis; HMS Dolphin; HMS Gosport; HMS Tartar; HMS Salisbury Prize; HMS Defiance; HMS Prince Frederick; HMS Breda; HMS Northumberland; Jamaica Station
- Conflicts: Anglo-Spanish War

Rear-Admiral Edward St Lo (died 14 April 1729) was a Royal Navy officer who served as Commander-in-Chief of the Jamaica Station. He may have been the son of the Commissioner of the Navy, George St Lo.

== Naval career ==
St Lo was promoted to post captain on 9 September 1703 on appointment to the command of the fourth-rate HMS Pendennis. He transferred to the command of the fifth-rate HMS Dolphin in September 1704, of the fifth-rate HMS Gosport (1696) in 1706. Following his acquittal at court martial for the loss of the Gosport to the French third-rank ship Jason, he commanded the fifth-rate HMS Tartar in 1707. He went on to receive the command the fourth-rate HMS Salisbury Prize in 1708, of the third-rate HMS Defiance in 1711 and of the third-rate HMS Prince Frederick in 1719. After that he took command of the third-rate HMS Breda in 1723 and of the third-rate HMS Northumberland later that year.

St Lo became Commander-in-Chief of the Jamaica Station, with his flag in the third-rate HMS Superb, in August 1727, following the death of Admiral Francis Hosier from tropical diseases, in charge of a small squadron which was undertaking a Blockade of Porto Bello during the Anglo-Spanish War. In January 1728, with the intention of returning to base for supplies, he handed over the command to Vice-Admiral Edward Hopson but when that admiral also succumbed to the diseases in May 1728, he took the command back. He was promoted to Rear Admiral on 29 March 1729 but died himself from the same diseases on 14 April 1729.

== Sources ==
- Cundall, Frank (1915). Historic Jamaica. West India Committee.

Military offices
| Preceded by Francis Hosier | Commander-in-Chief, Jamaica Station; 1727 | Succeeded by Edward Hopson |
| Preceded by Edward Hopson | Commander-in-Chief, Jamaica Station; 1728–1729 | Succeeded by William Smith |
