= John Cordy Jeaffreson =

John Cordy Jeaffreson (14 January 1831 – 2 February 1901) was an English novelist and writer of popular non-fiction. He also spent periods teaching and as an inspector of historical documents.

== Life ==
Jeaffreson was born at Framlingham, Suffolk, on 14 January 1831. He was the second son and ninth child of William Jeaffreson (1789–1865), a surgeon, and Caroline (died 1863), youngest child of George Edwards, tradesman there; and was named after his mother's uncle by marriage, John Cordy (1781–1828) of Worlingworth and Woodbridge. After education at the grammar schools of Woodbridge and Botesdale, he was apprenticed to his father in August 1845; but matriculated at Pembroke College, Oxford, on 22 June 1848, where among his undergraduate friends were the future novelists Henry Kingsley and Arthur Locker.

After graduating B.A. in May 1852, Jeaffreson lived in London for about six years, working as a private tutor and lecturing in schools. He also began to write. From 1856 he was a journalist, writing from 1858 for the rest of his life for the Athenaeum. He became a student at Lincoln's Inn on 18 June 1856 and was called to the bar on 30 April 1859, but did not practise law.

Jeaffreson moved in legal as well as in literary social circles. In 1860 he joined "Our Club", a literary group that was then a dining club, meeting weekly at Clunn's Hotel, Covent Garden. In 1872 Sir Thomas Duffus Hardy, a friend and deputy keeper of the Public Records, invited Jeaffreson to become an inspector of documents for the Historical Manuscripts Commission, and after palaeographical training at the Public Record Office he began work in 1874. He then concentrated on preparing reports and calendars of manuscript records.

After years of poor health, which brought his work to an end, Jeaffreson died on 2 February 1901 at his house in Maida Vale, and was buried in Paddington Old Cemetery, Willesden Lane.

== Works ==
Jeaffreson initially wrote novels, publishing Crewe Rise in 1854 and next year Hinchbrook, which ran as a serial in Fraser's Magazine. During the next thirty years a long series of orthodox three-volume novels followed; Live it Down (1863) and Not Dead Yet (1864) were well received on publication. Novels and Novelists from Elizabeth to Victoria (1858), compiled at the British Museum, opened up a popularising vein that became Jeaffreson's main work, leading to:

- A Book about Doctors (1860)
- A Book about Lawyers (1866)
- A Book about the Clergy (1870)
- Brides and Bridals (1872)
- A Book about the Table (1874)

On the recommendation of Hepworth Dixon, Jeaffreson collaborated with William Pole on the authorised biography of Robert Stephenson (1864, 2 vols.). Between 1876 and 1887 he published reports on 29 manuscript collections. Apart from private collections, he dealt with the archives of the cities and boroughs of Chester, Leicester, Pontefract, Barnstaple, Plymouth, Ipswich, Wisbech, Great Yarmouth, Eye, Southampton, and King's Lynn, as well as of the West Riding and North Riding of Yorkshire and the county of Essex. At Leicester he also compiled an index to the muniments (1881). He edited four volumes for the Middlesex County Record Society (1886–1892).

Jeaffreson inspected the manuscript collection of Alfred Morrison, and he obtained the owner's permission to edit unpublished correspondence of Lord Byron and Lord Nelson. In The Real Lord Byron: New Views of the Poet's Life (2 vols. 1883) he wrote on Byron and Percy Bysshe Shelley: Abraham Hayward and J. A. Froude wrote hostile reviews. His The Real Shelley: New Views of the Poet's Life (2 vols. 1885), was attacked by Edward Dowden. Jeaffreson's Lady Hamilton and Lord Nelson: an historical biography appeared in 1888 (2 vols.), and The Queen of Naples and Lord Nelson in 1889 (2 vols.; new edition 1897).

His other main works were:

- The Annals of Oxford, 1870 (a popular work, much criticised)
- Cutting for Partners, 3 vols. 1890
- A Book of Recollections, 2 vols. 1894
- A Young Squire of the Seventeenth Century, from the Papers of Christopher Jeaffreson of Dullingham House, Cambridgeshire, 2 vols. 1898

== Family ==
Jeaffreson married Arabella Ellen, only surviving daughter of William Eccles, F.R.C.S., on 2 October 1860, at the church of St Sepulchre-without-Newgate, Holborn. She survived him, along with their daughter, who died on 28 September 1909.

== Notes ==
Attribution

This article incorporates text from a publication now in the public domain: Lee, Sidney, ed. (1912). "Jeaffreson, John Cordy". Dictionary of National Biography (2nd supplement). Vol. 2. London: Smith, Elder & Co.
