= William Smith (Royal Navy officer) =

Rear-Admiral William Smith
- Died: 1756
- Military career
- Allegiance: Kingdom of Great Britain
- Branch: Royal Navy
- Rank: Rear-Admiral
- Commands: HMS Port Mahon; HMS Gosport; HMS Dartmouth; HMS York; Jamaica Station

Rear-Admiral William Smith (died 1756) was a Royal Navy officer who served as Commander-in-Chief of the Jamaica Station.

== Naval career ==
Smith was promoted to post captain on 10 May 1716 on appointment to the command of the sixth-rate HMS Port Mahon. He transferred to the command of the fifth-rate HMS Gosport in August 1720, of the fourth-rate HMS Dartmouth in 1721 and of the fourth-rate HMS York in 1726.

Smith served briefly as Commander-in-Chief of the Jamaica Station in 1729 and was promoted to Rear Admiral on 21 July 1747 during his retirement.

== Sources ==
- Cundall, Frank (1915). Historic Jamaica. West India Committee.

Military offices
Preceded by Edward St Lo	Commander-in-Chief, Jamaica Station; 1729	Succeeded by Charles Stewart
