= William Kerr (Royal Navy officer) =

Captain The Honourable William Kerr
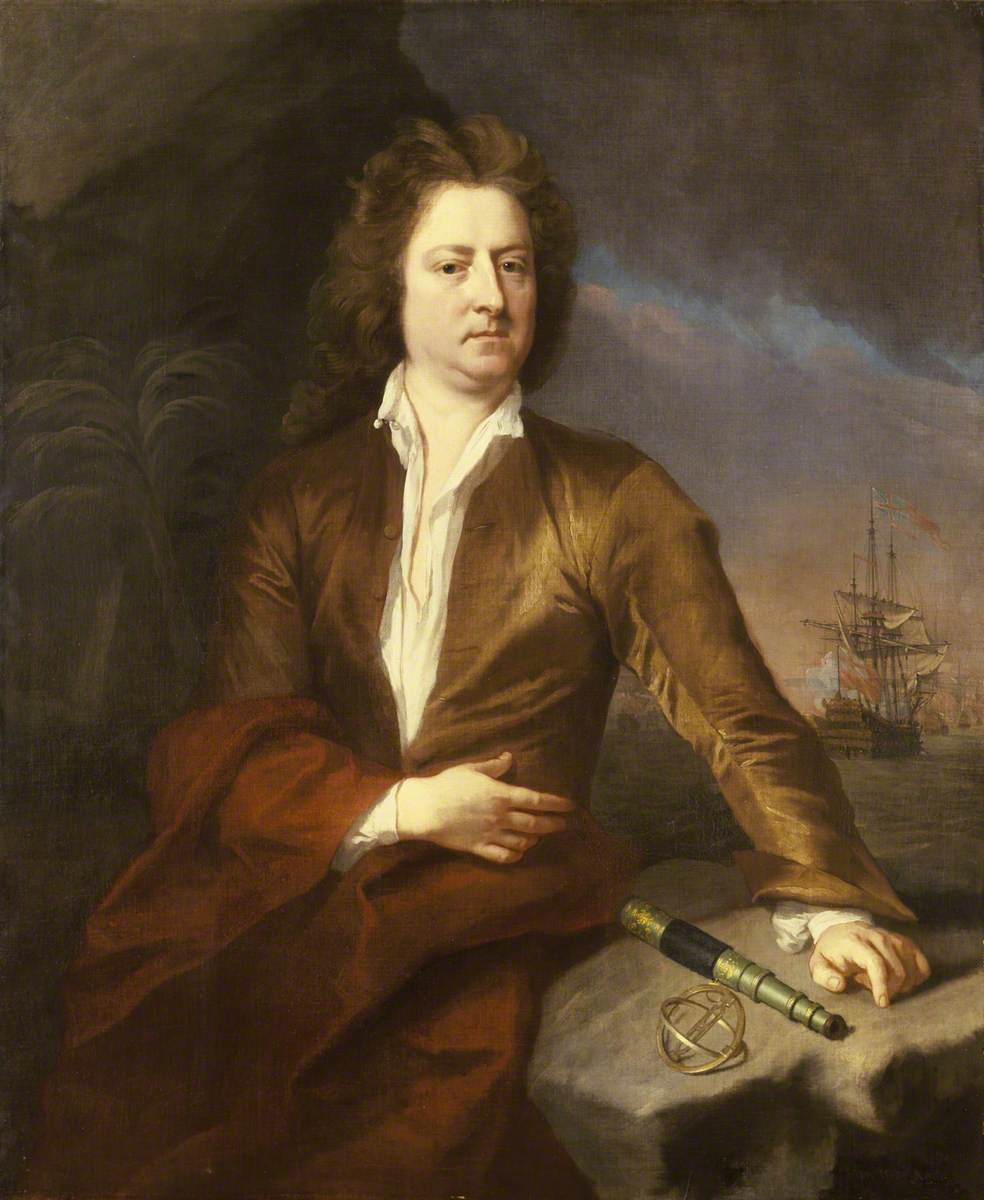
- Portrait by Michael Dahl, c. 1706
- Military career
- Allegiance: England; Great Britain
- Branch: Royal Navy
- Rank: Captain
- Commands: HMS Deptford; HMS Burlington; HMS Eagle; HMS Revenge; Jamaica Station

Captain William Kerr was a Royal Navy officer who served as Commander-in-Chief of the Jamaica Station.

== Naval career ==
Born a younger son of the Earl of Lothian, Kerr was promoted to post captain on 14 May 1690 on appointment to the command of the fourth-rate HMS Deptford. He transferred to the command of the fourth-rate HMS Burlington in 1696, of the third-rate HMS Lenox later the same year and of the third-rate HMS Eagle in 1700. He went on to receive the command the third-rate HMS Revenge in 1702.

Appointed a commodore, Kerr became Commander-in-Chief of the Jamaica Station in 1706. Starved of resources including medicines to treat his men, who were sick from tropical diseases, Kerr was unable to prevent the Spanish ships from leaving port. On return his to England he was prosecuted, impeached and then dismissed from the Royal Navy.

== Sources ==
- Cundall, Frank (1915). Historic Jamaica. West India Committee.

Military offices
Preceded by Sir William Whetstone	Commander-in-Chief, Jamaica Station; 1706	Succeeded by Sir John Jennings
