= Gosport (disambiguation) =

Gosport may refer to:

== United Kingdom ==
- Gosport, a town in Hampshire, England
  - Gosport (UK Parliament constituency)
  - HMS Gosport, the name of three ships of the Royal Navy
- Gosport, Test Valley, a village in the parish of Ampfield, Hampshire, England
- Gosport Shipyard

== Canada ==
- Gosport, Lennox and Addington County, Ontario
- Gosport, Northumberland County, Ontario

== United States ==
- Gosport, Alabama, town
- Gosport, Indiana, town
- Gosport, New Hampshire, former town incorporating several of the Isles of Shoals in the Atlantic Ocean; now part of the town of Rye, New Hampshire
- Gosport Shipyard, original name of Norfolk Naval Shipyard

== Other uses ==
- Gosport Aircraft Company, a former British aircraft manufacturer based in Gosport, Hampshire.
- Gosport tube, a speaking tube used in early aviation for communication between seats of open-air aircraft.
