= George St Lo =

Officer of the Royal Navy

Captain George St Lo
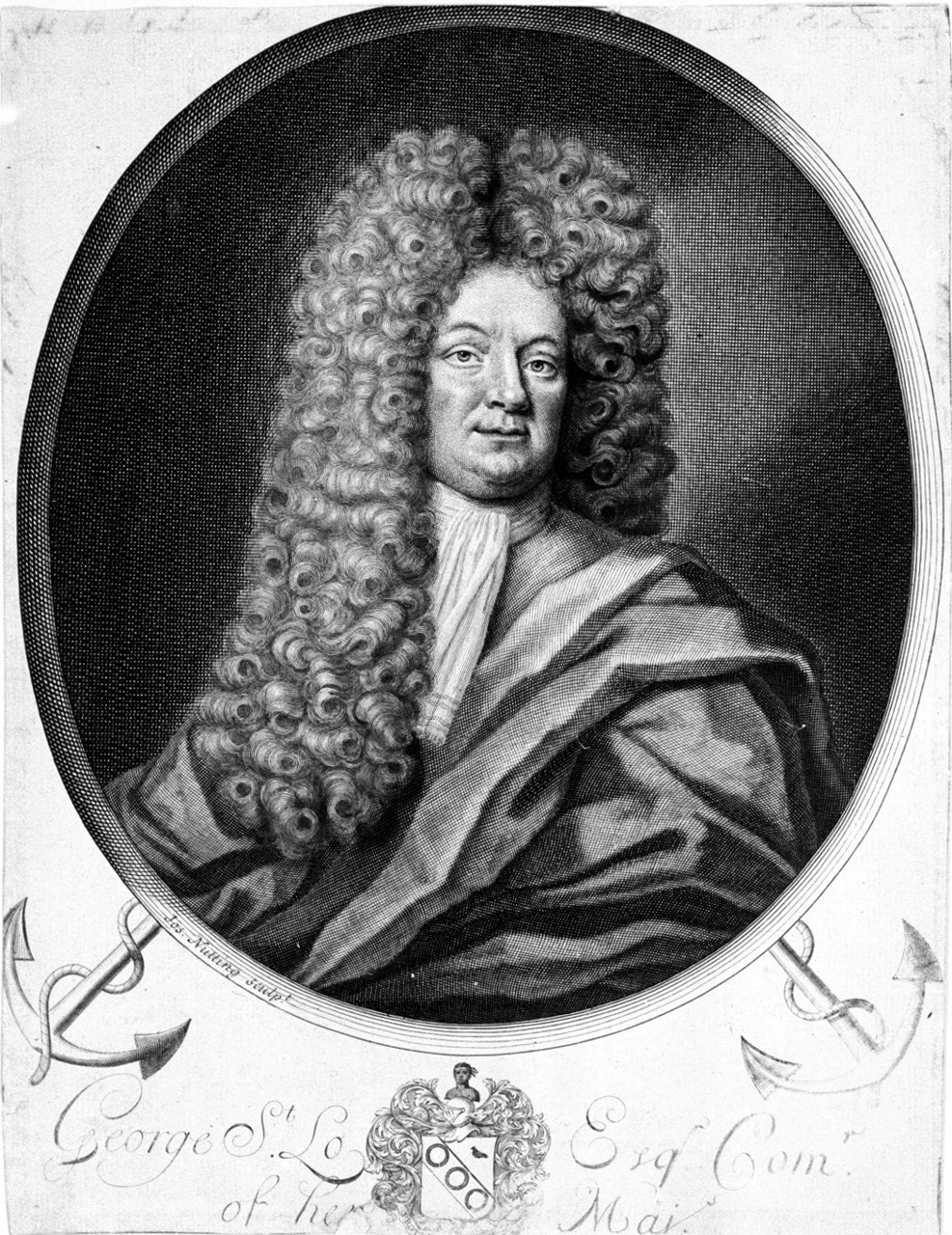
- Born: 19 April 1655
- Died: 20 September 1718 (aged 63); Northfleet, Kent
- Burial place: Northfleet
- Relatives: Edward St Lo (nephew)
- Military career
- Allegiance: Kingdom of Great Britain
- Branch: Royal Navy
- Service years: –1718
- Rank: Captain
- Commands: HMS Dartmouth; HMS Portsmouth
- Conflicts: Nine Years' War; Battle of Bantry Bay; War of the Spanish Succession

George St Lo (sometimes written as St Loe; 19 April 1655 – 20 September 1718) was a British naval officer and politician.

An officer of the Royal Navy who saw service during the Nine Years' War, and the War of the Spanish Succession. His career cut short by injuries, he embarked on a political career, holding offices as a commissioner of the navy and was a Member of Parliament.

St Lo entered on a naval career, and after service in the Mediterranean on several ships, rose to the rank of captain with his own commands. Controversy occasionally followed his career, such as an investigation on murder charges while a lieutenant. He supported the Glorious Revolution in 1688, claiming to have had an important part in its success. His active seagoing career came to an end after 1689, when his ship was captured by French warship and St Lo was wounded. After time in France as a prisoner of war, he returned to England and took up various political positions, while writing about his observations and thoughts on naval administration. Holding administrative posts, and serving as commissioner for some of the dockyards, he was also an extra commissioner for the navy. As commissioner at Plymouth he had an important role in supporting the construction of the first Eddystone Lighthouse, but when he sent the project's guardship away, the crew and the architect, Henry Winstanley, were promptly captured by a French privateer. Though the men were eventually released, perhaps by the personal intervention of Louis XIV of France, St Lo was reprimanded.

St Lo entered parliamentary politics in 1701, sitting for the constituency of Weymouth and Melcombe Regis. He supported the Tory interest, until his defeat in 1705. He continued his administrative career until the accession of King George I in 1714, and was left unemployed in the subsequent redistribution of posts. He died four years later.

== Family and early life ==
St Lo was born on 19 April 1655, the fourth son of John St Lo of Little Fontmel, Dorset. His mother was Margaret, née Fawconer, the daughter of William Fawconer of Salisbury. George's grandfather was Edward St Lo, of Knighton, Wiltshire. George's family gave him important political connections, as he descended on his father's side from the Hyde family. His great-grandmother Elizabeth was the granddaughter of Laurence Hyde, of Hatch, Wiltshire, who was the grandfather of Edward Hyde, 1st Earl of Clarendon. St Lo's parentage brought him the important patronage of Laurence Hyde, 1st Earl of Rochester, which aided his rise through the navy. He was a third cousin of Queen Mary II and Queen Anne, which also was a factor in his later actions in support of the Orangist cause.

St Lo entered the navy and after a period of service, was appointed as lieutenant of HMS Phoenix on 16 January 1678, serving in the Mediterranean in operations against the Barbary States. The commander in the Mediterranean, Admiral Arthur Herbert, moved St Lo into the 46-gun HMS Hampshire under Captain Sir George Rooke, but while serving on her in May 1681, he found himself accused, with another officer, of having committed a murder in Tangier. The matter was investigated, with St Lo acquitted in September 1682. His career does not appear to have suffered unduly by the accusation, as he was promoted to captain on 11 April 1682, and given command of the 50-gun HMS Dartmouth.^{[a]}

St Lo remained with Dartmouth for the next six years, recommissioning her in March 1685. He went out to the West Indies in 1686, and while there clashed with the acting governor of the Leeward Islands, Sir James Russell. Russell had been profiting from the widespread piracy going on in the Caribbean waters, causing St Lo to criticize this as an abuse of his authority. His next command was the 46-gun HMS Portsmouth, which he took over on 30 August 1688. The Portsmouth was attached to the fleet under Admiral George Legge, 1st Baron Dartmouth, based in the River Medway during the events of the Glorious Revolution. Legge failed to intercept the fleet bringing William of Orange to Britain, with St Lo later declaring himself an avowed supporter of the new regime. He wrote that he

was so true a friend to the Revolution ... that (at the peril of his life) he brought the Prince of Orange’s Declaration into the fleet then in the Downes ... notwithstanding it had been declared that whoever brought the same should be tried for sedition. After this the officers of the fleet came to a resolution not to fight the Dutch and subscriptions were taken to that purpose which were carried to the Prince of Orange.

== Later career ==
=== French capture and pamphlets ===
St Lo's support for the Orangists secured his career, and he remained in command of Portsmouth after the revolution. He was present at the Battle of Bantry Bay on 1 May 1689, but while in the English Channel in August 1689, Portsmouth was attacked by the 58-gun French ship Marquis, and was captured.^{[b]} St Lo was severely injured in the seven-hour-long engagement, and was taken prisoner. The French took him to Brest, and then to Nantes, as a prisoner of war. St Lo spent the next two years a prisoner, a period he later claimed cost him £500 in expenses. He was paid £100 from the royal bounty, and his wife made a petition for him to be exchanged on 11 January 1691. His time spent in Brest and Nantes was put to good use in observing the French naval system, and in 1693 he published the pamphlet England's Safety, or a Bridle to the French King, based on his observations. Impressed by the speed of French naval preparations, he wrote that

"while [I] was at Brest, I was astonished by the expedition used by the French in manning and fitting out their ships, which, till then, I thought could be done no where sooner than in England, where we have ten times the shipping, and consequently ten times more seamen than they have in France. But there I saw twenty sail of ships, of about sixty guns each, got ready in twenty days time: they were brought in, and the men discharged; and upon an order from Paris they were careened, keeled up, rigged, victualled, manned, and out again in the said time, with the greatest ease imaginable. I likewise saw one ship, of one hundred guns, had all her guns taken out there in four or five hours time, which I never saw done in England in twenty-four hours, and this with great ease and less hazard."

St Lo was back in England by September 1692, as in this month he presented to the Privy Council proposals for raising 20,000 seamen for the navy without having to resort to impressment. St Lo proposed that merchants be required to register their ships. For every 50 tuns, the merchant should provide one seaman for the navy, or else be liable to pay a £5 volunteering bounty. He followed this up with second pamphlet, published in 1694, England's Interest, or, A Discipline for Seamen, in which he further propounded his views on the manning of the navy.

=== Administrative posts ===
St Lo's wounds sustained in the battle appear to have put an end to his service at sea. He was offered the post of governor of New York, but declined in January 1693 on the grounds of the "indisposition occasioned by his wound". Instead on 8 January 1693 he was appointed a commissioner of prizes. The appointment was short-lived, he relinquished it on 23 January, and on 24 June 1693 he was appointed to sit on the Navy Board as an extra commissioner of the navy. His posting here was delayed for two months though as an investigation was taking place into alleged abuses during his time as a prize commissioner, for which he was eventually acquitted.

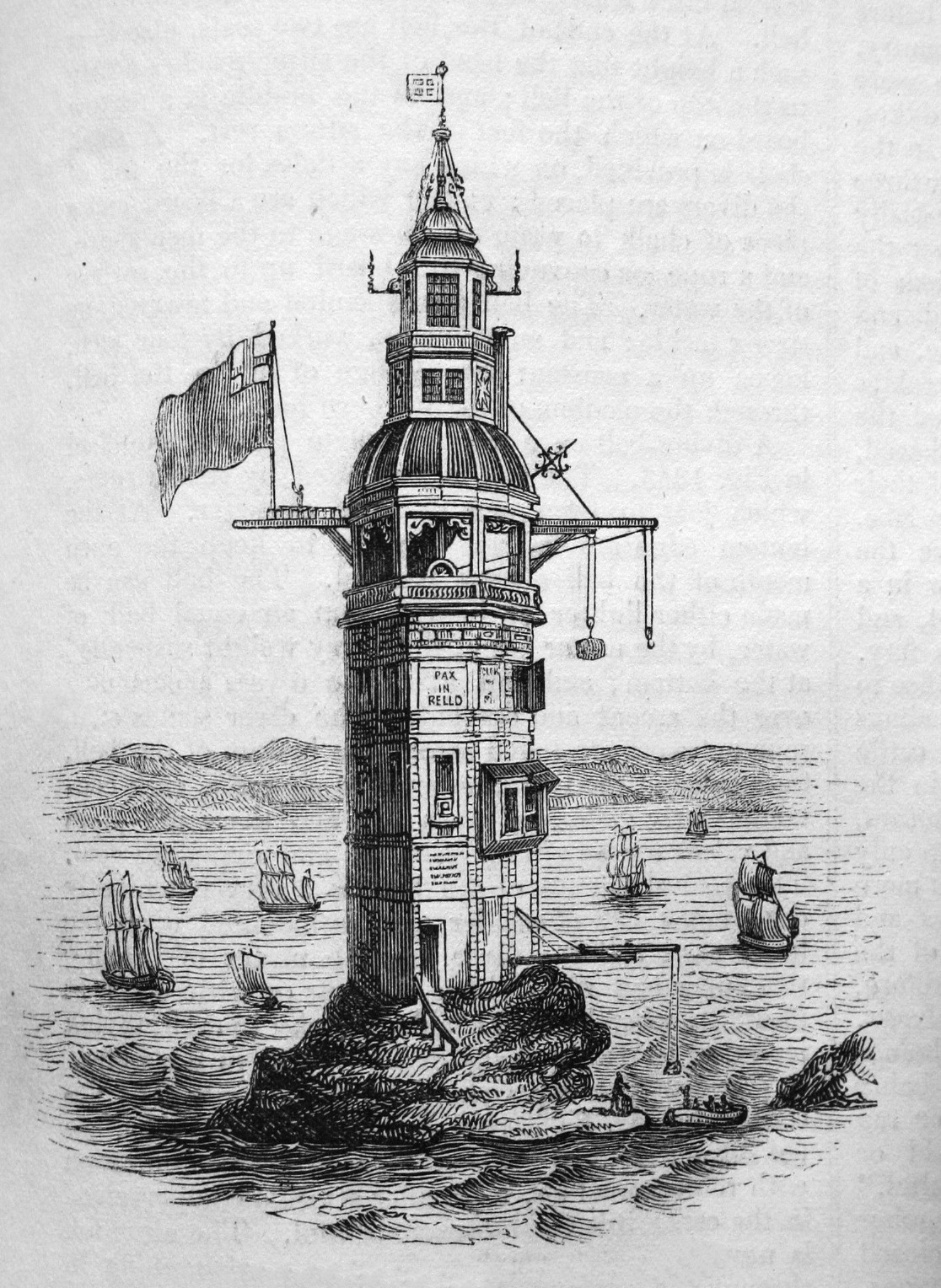
The first Eddystone Lighthouse, designed by Henry Winstanley, and under construction during St Lo's time as commissioner at Plymouth

An appointment as resident-commissioner at Plymouth followed in 1695, and in 1697 he received orders to assist in the building of the first Eddystone Lighthouse, to the design drawn up by Henry Winstanley. St Lo was required to provide protection for the workers on the exposed rock, and he assigned the 26-gun HMS Terrible to this task. In June however he took the Terrible from her duties to join the fleet, and failed to provide a replacement. A French privateer happened upon the undefended rock, and promptly took the workers, and Winstanley, captive, and transported them to France. Word of Winstanley's capture is supposed to have reached King Louis XIV, who ordered his release with the comment "France is at war with England, not with humanity." St Lo received a sharp reprimand from the Navy Board for this turn of events, for having neglected their orders to him.

Despite these events he sent various proposals to the House of Lords on the subject of improving naval administration. He submitted a paper to the committee on a shipbuilding bill in April 1694, and gave evidence concerning naval maladministration in March 1695. Commenting on the difficulties of preventing smuggling in England's Caribbean possessions, he wrote "Most of Our Islands, but especially Antegua and St. Christopher have so many bays & places where they may put on board Sugars, yet it is impossible for ye Custom house Officers (tho ever so careful) to prevent". St Lo suggested that "two or three Small vessels [with] good sailors [should be sent] to cruise up & down, [and] examine all Sloops & Boates passing to & fro."

== Parliamentary career ==
St Lo's interest in politics began prior to 1698, when he stood as a candidate for the constituency of Weymouth and Melcombe Regis. He was defeated that year, and again when he stood at the January 1701 election. He was successful however in the November 1701 election, where he went on to represent Tory interests. He approved the motion on 26 February 1702, vindicating the impeachments of King William's Whig ministers, and on 13 February 1703 opposed the Lords' amendments to the bill for enlarging the time for taking the oath of abjuration. St Lo was listed as a placeman in 1705, and on being defeated at the election that year, retired from parliamentary politics.

== Later administrative duties ==
St Lo had been appointed an equerry to Prince George of Denmark by 1700, a post he held until c. 1704, and in 1703 moved from Plymouth to Chatham, still serving as a resident commissioner. While at Chatham he took an interest in dry docks and designed a prototype entrance caisson for the yard. Keenly interested in efficiency, he was outspoken in his desire for reform, leading to a description of him as "one of the most forceful if not to say irregular, of the outstation commissioners". He was at times combative with his superiors, being reprimanded by the Navy Board on 4 October 1699 for expressing himself "in such a manner as inferior officers ought not to do towards their superiors". Another reprimand came after his move from Plymouth to Chatham, for taking with him both the new dockyard yacht, HMS St Lo, and items of official correspondence. His assertive nature was further illustrated in an incident when he confronted striking dockyard workers at Chatham with a drawn sword, and chased them from the yard. While living at Chatham he ordered the dockyard's commissioner's house to be rebuilt.

St Lo was commissioner at Chatham until the post was abolished on 21 October 1712, on the justification of "for easing the public charge". Instead he was appointed commander-in-chief of all ships in the Medway and at the Nore. The accession of King George I in 1714 caused him to be superseded, and on 16 November that year he ceased to be on the Navy Board as well. He entered retirement and saw no further service or employment.

== Family and legacy ==
St Lo married Elizabeth Cheffinch, the daughter of Amphilis Cheffinch of St Martin-in-the-Fields, Westminster, on 26 March 1682. They had one son, John, and two daughters, Elizabeth and Mary.^{[c]} George St Lo died in retirement at Northfleet on 20 September 1718. His will, dated 4 October 1716, was proved on 8 October 1718, and he was buried in Northfleet. His nephew, Edward St Lo, followed his uncle in a naval career, rising to the rank of rear-admiral, before succumbing to disease during the War of the Austrian Succession.

== Notes ==
a. A slight disagreement exists between Laughton's biography in the Dictionary of National Biography, and Watson's in The History of Parliament. Watson writes that St Lo was not promoted to captain until 1688, although his summary of achievements in the same source notes that he was a captain in 1682.

b. Laughton writes that this took place in 1690. Watson writes August 1689. J. J. Colledge's Ships of the Royal Navy confirms that Portsmouth was taken in August 1689, and subsequently blew up.

c. Watson mentions only one daughter and one son. Laughton names two daughters, plus his son John, but goes on to speculate that Edward St Lo appears to have been another son, who was not mentioned in the will. Watson instead notes that Edward was George's nephew.

== Citations ==
Parliament of England
Preceded by Henry Thynne; Charles Churchill; Michael Harvey; Thomas Freke	Member of Parliament for Weymouth and Melcombe Regis; 1701–1705; With: Charles Churchill; Sir Christopher Wren (1701–1702); Maurice Ashley (1701–1702); Henry Thynne (1702–1705); Anthony Henley (1702–1705)	Succeeded by Maurice Ashley; Charles Churchill; Henry Thynne; Anthony Henley
