= Frederick Locker-Lampson =

English poet (1821–1895)

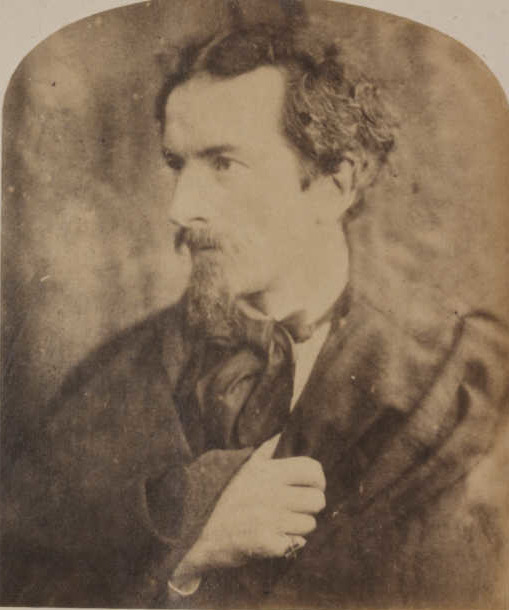
Frederick Locker-Lampson (1867)

Frederick Locker-Lampson (May 29, 1821 – May 30, 1895) was an English man of letters, bibliophile and poet.

== Overview ==
He was born at Greenwich Hospital. His father, who was Civil Commissioner of the Hospital, Edward Hawke Locker, was the youngest son of Captain William Locker who gave Nelson the memorable advice "lay a Frenchman close, and you will beat him." His mother, Eleanor Mary Elizabeth Boucher, was a daughter of the Revd. Jonathan Boucher, vicar of Epsom and friend of George Washington.

After a desultory education, Frederick Locker began life in a colonial broker's office. Soon he obtained a clerkship in Somerset House, where hence he was transferred to Lord Haddington's private office at the Admiralty. Here he became deputy-reader and precis writer. In 1850 he married Lady Charlotte Bruce, daughter of Lord Elgin who brought the famous marbles to England, and sister of Lady Augusta Stanley. After his marriage he left the Civil Service, in consequence of ill-health.

In 1857, he published London Lyrics, a slender volume of 90 pages, which, with subsequent extensions, constitutes his poetical legacy. Lyra Elegantiarum (1867), an anthology of light and familiar verse, and Patchwork (1879), a book of extracts, were his only other publications in his lifetime.

In 1872, Lady Charlotte Locker died. Two years later Locker married Miss Hannah Jane Lampson, the only daughter of Sir Curtis Miranda Lampson, Bart., of Rowfant House, Sussex, and in 1885 he added his wife's surname to his own to form a new family surname, Locker-Lampson. He died at Rowfant on 30 May 1895 and was buried in Worth church yard near Crawley, Sussex.

He had five children: Eleanor by his first wife, and Godfrey, Dorothy, Oliver and Maud by his second. Eleanor married first, to Lionel Tennyson, younger son of the poet Alfred Lord Tennyson, and after his death married the writer and Liberal politician Augustine Birrell.

== Literary and bibliophilic legacy ==
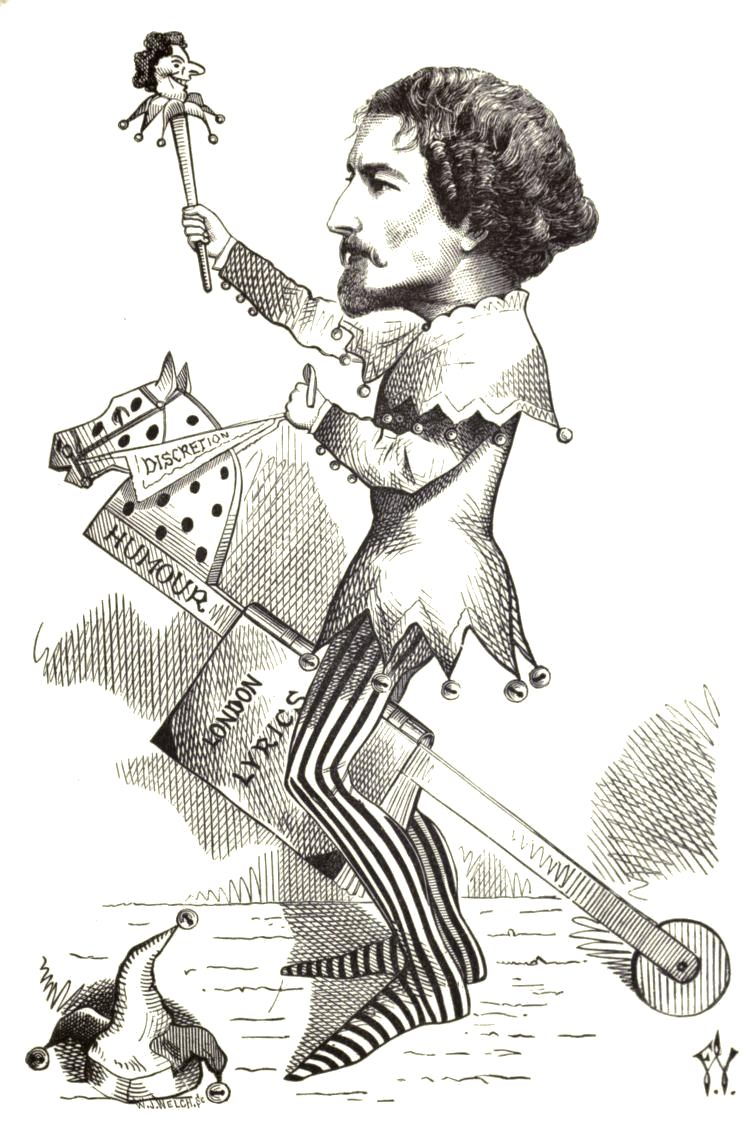
Frederick Locker. A melancholy jester by Frederick Waddy (1871)

Chronic ill-health debarred Locker from any active part in life, but it did not prevent his delighting a wide circle of friends with his gifts as a host and raconteur, and from accumulating many treasures as a connoisseur. He was acquainted with practically all the major literary figures of the age, including Matthew Arnold, the Brownings, Carlyle, Dickens, George Eliot, Leigh Hunt, Ruskin, Tennyson, Thackeray and Trollope. He was also a mentor to the illustrator artists Randolph Caldecott and Kate Greenaway.

He was a noted bibliophile and one of the foremost exponents of the "Cabinet" style of book collecting. He catalogued his own collection of rare books, first editions, prints and manuscripts in a volume named after his family home in Sussex, the Rowfant Library (1886). An Appendix compiled by his elder son, Godfrey, was published in 1900. The Rowfant Club, a Cleveland-based society of book collectors, is named after his home.

== Biographies ==
A post humous volume of his memoirs, entitled My Confidences, appeared in 1896. In The Varieties of Religious Experience (1902) William James wrote of the 'amiable' personality shown in this book: "This is a complex, tender, submissive, and graceful state of mind. For myself, I should have no objection to calling it on the whole a religious state of mind, although I dare say that to many of you it may seem too listless and half-hearted to merit so good a name."

Frederick Locker-Lampson: A Character Sketch, which includes a selection of his letters, was composed and edited by his son-in-law, Augustine Birrell in 1920. This gives an interesting idea of his personality and literary connections as well as notes on his book collection.
