= Edward Hawke Locker =

English painter

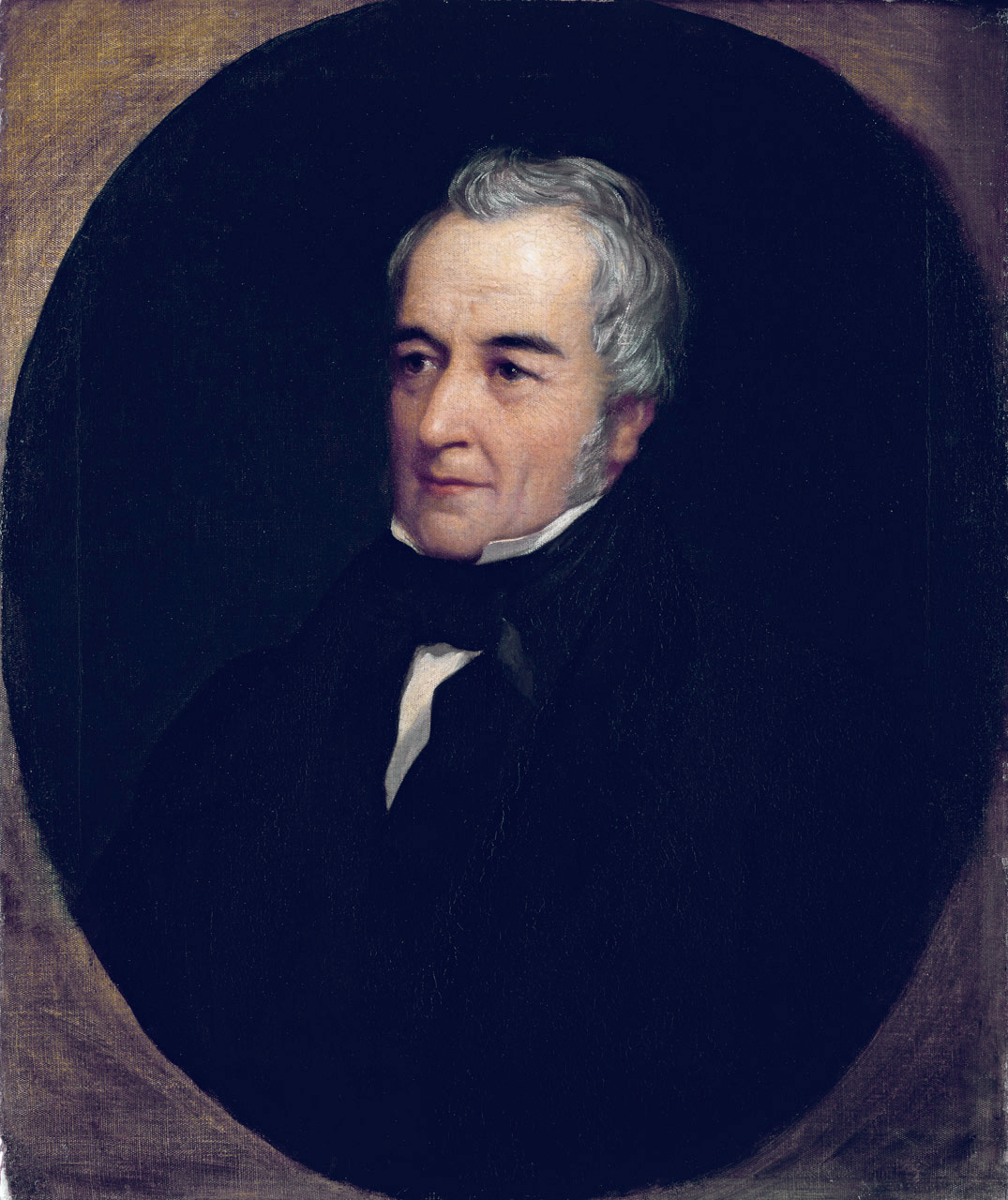
Edward Hawke Locker (by Henry Wyndham Phillips, c. 1840)

Edward Hawke Locker (9 October 1777, in East Malling, Kent – 16 October 1849, in Iver, Buckinghamshire) was an English watercolourist (producing works now in the V&A and British Museum) and administrator of the Royal Naval Hospital, Greenwich.

== Life ==
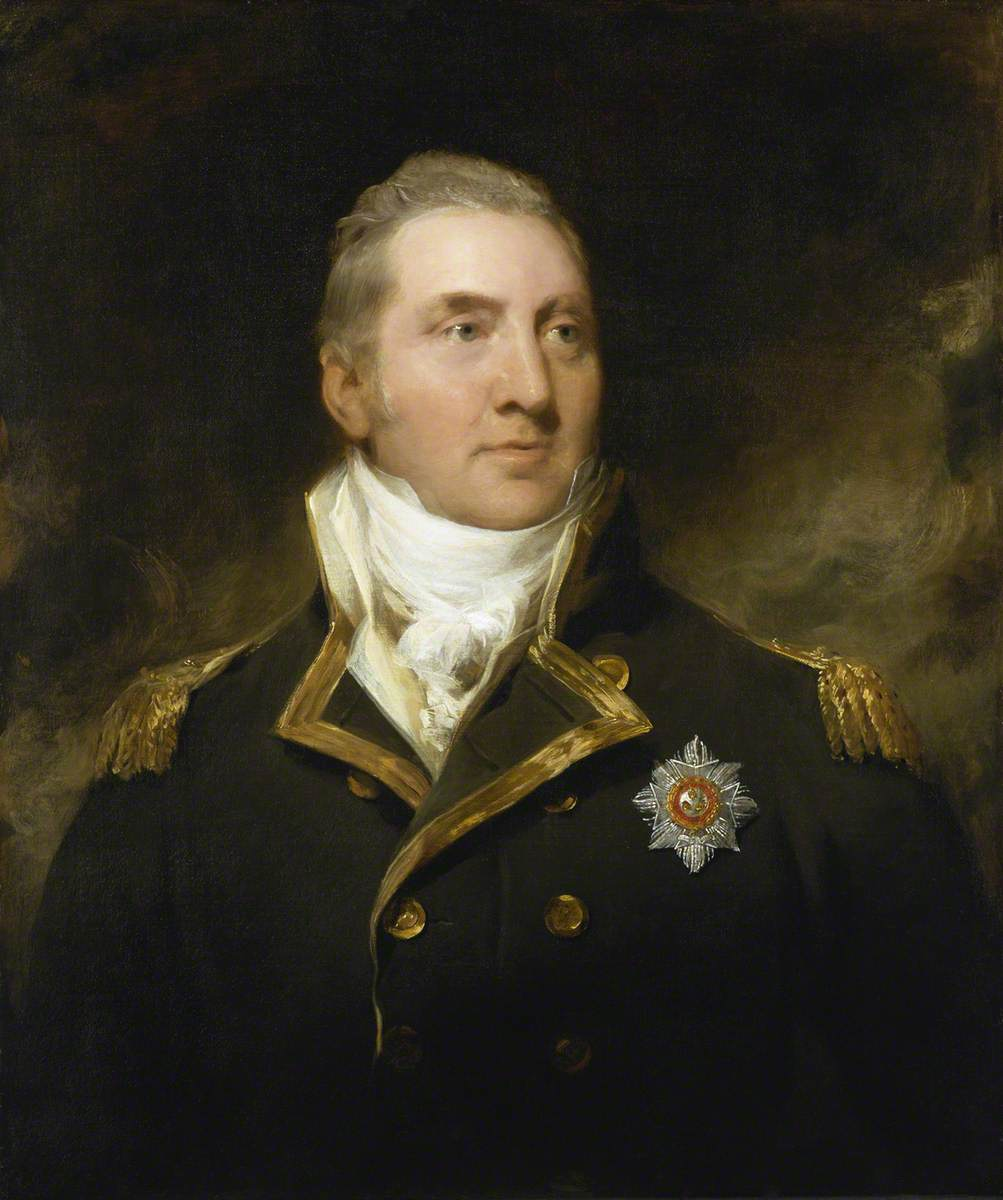
Portrait of Sir Edward Pellew by Thomas Lawrence

He was the fourth (of five) surviving child and youngest son of the naval captain William Locker, and was named after his father's patron Admiral Edward Hawke. Entering the navy pay office as a clerk on 1 June 1795, he served in its India department (from 1799) and the board of naval enquiry before becoming a prize agent and Edward Pellew's civil secretary during his East Indies, North Sea and Mediterranean commands from 1804 to 1814. He was in England in July 1802, when he accompanied the French balloonist André-Jacques Garnerin on his second English ascent during the Peace of Amiens. He also spent time in Spain in 1813 during the Peninsular War alongside Lord John Russell, bringing despatches to Wellington, as well as visiting Napoleon in May 1814 during his Elba exile.

He was married in 1815 to Eleanor Mary Elizabeth Boucher, whose father the Revd Jonathan Boucher had once been a friend of George Washington. Their children included the poet Frederick Locker-Lampson (1821–1895) and the novelist-journalist Arthur Locker (1828–1893), later the editor of The Graphic. The couple lived at Windsor (1815–19) then at Greenwich (1819 onwards). He was appointed secretary (1819) and then civil commissioner (1824) to the Royal Naval Hospital, which he worked to improve by adding new roads by John Macadam in the Northumbrian coal mines it owned and in 1824 carrying forward his father's plans for a Naval Gallery in the Hospital's Painted Hall, with a gift of 31 paintings from George IV (the nucleus of the later National Maritime Museum). He joined Lord John Russell again as one of the founder members of the Athenaeum Club. However a mental breakdown in 1844 forced him to retire from running the hospital, and he retired to Iver, where he died five years later.

== Works ==
- Views of Spain, 1824, with illustrations after his own watercolours

== Sources ==
- "Locker, Edward Hawke". Oxford Dictionary of National Biography (online ed.). Oxford University Press. doi:10.1093/ref:odnb/16893. (Subscription, Wikipedia Library access or UK public library membership required.)
