= Arthur Locker =

English journalist and novelist (1828–1893)

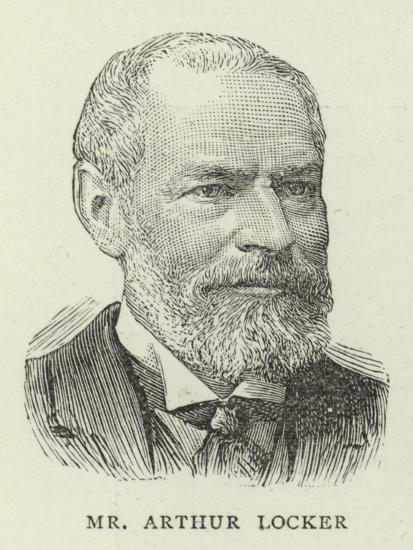
- Locker in 1890
- Born: 2 July 1828; Greenwich, London, England
- Died: 23 June 1893 (aged 64); Highgate West Hill, Highgate, London, England
- Education: Charterhouse School; Pembroke College, Oxford (BA)
- Occupations: Journalist, novelist
- Spouse(s): Mary Jane Rouse; Catharine Sarah Carpenter née Clulioth
- Parent: Edward Hawke Locker (father)
- Relatives: Frederick Locker-Lampson (brother)

Arthur Locker (2 July 1828 – 23 June 1893) was an English journalist and novelist.

== Early life and education ==
The second son of Edward Hawke Locker, he was born at Greenwich on 2 July 1828; Frederick Locker-Lampson was his brother. He was educated at Charterhouse School and Pembroke College, Oxford, where he matriculated on 6 May 1847, and graduated with a B.A. in 1851.

== Career ==
Locker went into commerce in a Liverpool office. Attracted by the Australian Gold Rush of the time, he emigrated to Victoria, and there took up journalism and other writing. He returned to the UK in 1861, where he wrote extensively for newspapers and magazines.

In 1863, Locker obtained work with The Times, which lasted until 1870, when he was appointed editor of The Graphic a few months after it was founded. He brought on young writers.

== Personal life and death ==
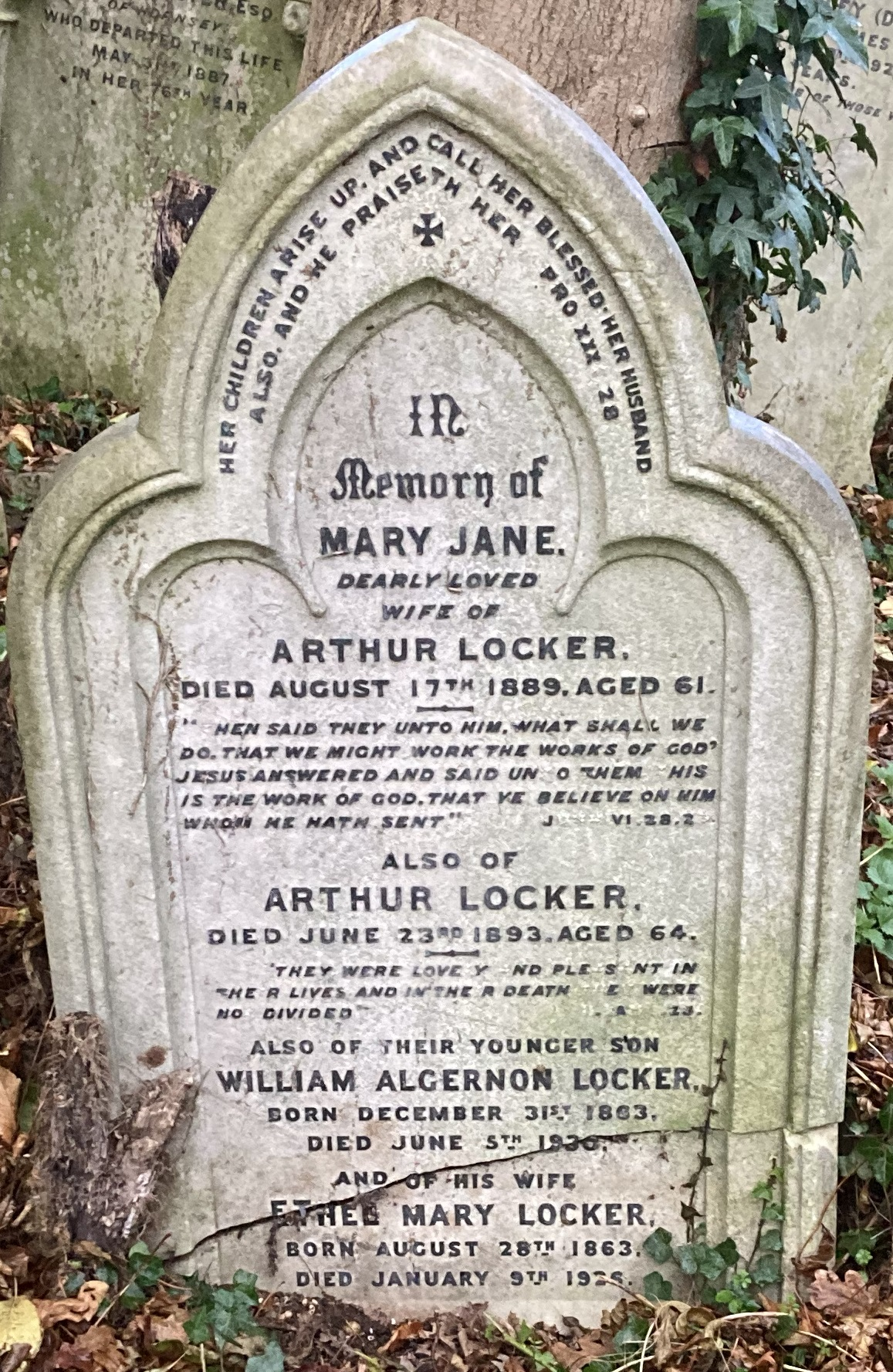
Grave of Arthur Locker in Highgate Cemetery

In December 1891, poor health saw Locker retire. After visiting Madeira and the Isle of Wight, he died at 79 West Hill, Highgate, London, on 23 June 1893 and was buried on the eastern side of Highgate Cemetery. He was twice married, to Mary Jane Rouse and after her death to Catharine Sarah Carpenter née Clulioth.

== Works ==
Locker published fiction, mainly based on his Australian experiences:

- Sweet Seventeen, 1866
- On a Coral Reef, juvenile literature, 1869
- Stephen Scudamore the Younger, 1871
- The Village Surgeon, 1874

== Notes ==
Attribution

This article incorporates text from a publication now in the public domain: Lee, Sidney, ed. (1901). "Locker, Arthur". Dictionary of National Biography (1st supplement). Vol. 3. London: Smith, Elder & Co.
