= Thomas Whetstone =

English privateer

Captain Sir Thomas Whetstone
- Born: 1630; Netherlands
- Died: 1668 (?); Jamaica
- Relatives: Kieran Whetstone
- Military career
- Allegiance: Kingdom of England
- Branch: Royal Navy
- Service years: 15
- Rank: Captain
- Commands: Jamaica Station

Sir Thomas Whetstone (1630 – 1668?) was an English privateer and naval officer whose career resulted from nepotism and his connections to Oliver Cromwell, his maternal uncle.

== Naval career ==
Whetstone was probably born in the Netherlands. His father was an army officer, and his mother was the favourite sister of Oliver Cromwell. During the Interregnum, Whetstone volunteered for naval service on the expedition to Hispaniola in 1654. Because of pressure from the Lord Protector, Whetstone went from volunteer to lieutenant to command of a ship called Golden Cock on his return to England. In 1656, he was put in command of Phoenix and then Fairfax the next year. In 1657, he was put in command of a squadron in the Mediterranean. Acting as a privateer, Whetstone disobeyed direct orders and sold a prize ship of grain for his own profit. When his command was revoked in response, Whetstone deserted and sailed his ship for Algiers.

Oliver Cromwell's support was unswayed, however. In 1658, Whetstone was supposed to lead a command of ships that would collaborate with the French in an attack on Spain. He stayed in port, however, quarrelling and trading, and the venture never formed. When Cromwell died in September 1658, Whetstone was relieved of command and taken prisoner.

A court martial was scheduled, approved by Richard Cromwell, but it failed to meet, and Whetstone went over to the royalist side. In 1659, he sailed to meet Charles II of England, who knighted Whetstone and sent him to rally the Royal Navy and convince them to change sides. Whetstone, however, was arrested by republican sympathisers and sent to Flanders for trial. At the Restoration, he was back in England, imprisoned in Marshalsea for debt.

Eventually, Charles II granted Whetstone 100 pounds sterling and a letter of recommendation to become a planter in Jamaica. Additionally, Whetstone married a widow who carried with her some wealth. In Jamaica, the governor, Sir Thomas Modyford, helped Whetstone, and he was soon a leader of the colony. In 1663, Whetstone commanded a naval squadron of thirteen privateers, and the next year he was the speaker of House of Assembly of Jamaica. His forces seized the Spanish-held Providence Island in 1666, but the Spanish retook the island and sent Whetstone, in chains, to Panama. He was eventually released from prison, but his name disappears from public records around 1668. It is presumed that he died in that year.

== Sources ==
- Cundall, Frank (1915). Historic Jamaica. West India Committee.
