= William Whetstone =

Royal Navy Officer (d. 1711)

Rear-Admiral of the Blue Sir William Whetstone
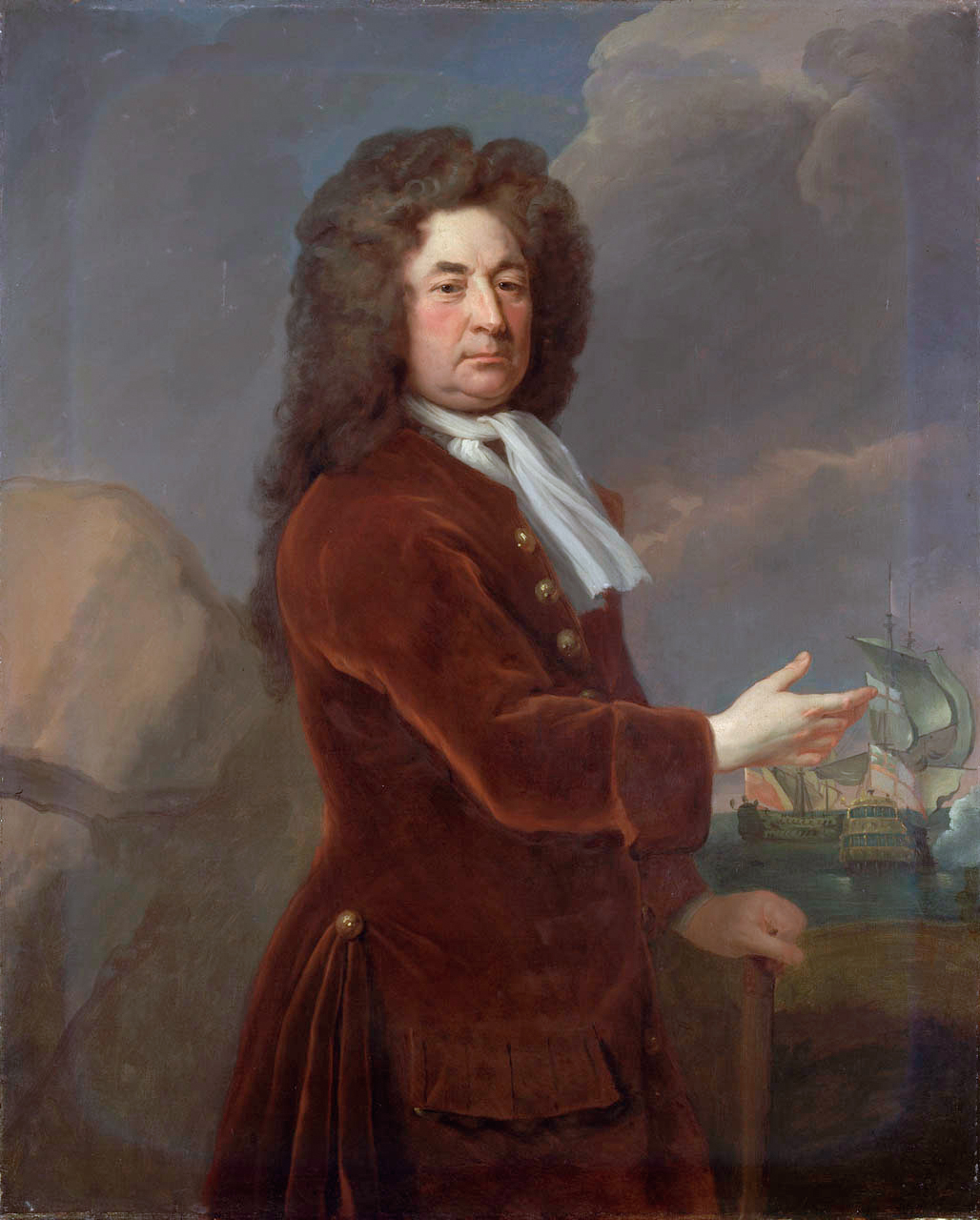
- Portrait by Michael Dahl, c. 1707
- Died: 1711
- Military career
- Allegiance: England
- Branch: Royal Navy
- Service years: 1689–1707
- Rank: Rear-Admiral of the Blue
- Commands: HMS Portsmouth; HMS Norfolk; HMS York; HMS Dreadnought; HMS Yarmouth; HMS Canterbury; HMS Montagu; Jamaica Station

Rear-Admiral of the Blue Sir William Whetstone (died 1711) was a Royal Navy officer who served in the War of the Spanish Succession.

== Family and early life ==
Whetstone appears to have been born into a naval family, his father John Whetstone had probably been a naval officer. William established himself in Bristol, becoming a member of Bristol corporation and commanding a merchant ship, the Mary of Bristol, with which he carried out trading with Virginia and Barbados. His trading appears to have been in a wide variety of goods, including serge.

He appears to have married a woman named Sarah by 1677, and that year he took an apprenticeship that would last until 1684. This marriage produced two sons and two daughters, his eldest daughter, also named Sarah, married the naval officer Woodes Rogers. William's first wife died in 1698 and was buried in the church of St Nicholas's, Bristol, on 19 October 1698.

== Naval career ==
William entered navy service, being appointed on 30 July 1689 to command the hired ship Europa, and he spent the next two years conveying supplies to Ireland. He was then briefly appointed to command HMS Portsmouth from 3 February to 12 August 1691. Here he came to the attention of Admiral Edward Russell, who described him as 'a good man'. He did not however exert himself on Whetstone's behalf, and William spent 1692 unemployed. He returned to active duty in 1693, at first as the part owner of the privateer Delavall, and later receiving a commission to command HMS Norfolk which was then being built at Southampton. She was launched on 27 March 1693, and Whetstone proceeded to man the ship. He was discharged from her on 23 May. A series of brief commands followed before he took command of HMS York from 13 July 1693 to 13 June 1695.

== In the Atlantic and Caribbean ==
Whetstone's next command was to HMS Dreadnought on 6 July 1696. He sailed her to Newfoundland, spending the next three years on the station, being finally discharged on 13 July 1699. The command of HMS Yarmouth followed, lasting from 19 May 1700 to 4 June 1701, when Whetstone was promoted to commodore and was moved to the York at the head of the squadron dispatched to Jamaica. He attempted to set sail, but was twice forced to return to Plymouth for repairs. He then made better progress, but soon had to put into Cork. She was then surveyed and pronounced unfit for the journey to the West Indies. Whetstone instead took command of HMS Canterbury on 4 February 1702 and was finally able to cross the Atlantic. He arrived in the West Indies in May, joining the fleet at Port Royal under the command of Vice-Admiral John Benbow. Benbow gave him the local rank of rear-admiral.

By now the War of the Spanish Succession had broken out, and news of its declaration reached Benbow on 7 July. He detached Whetstone and six ships to search off Port St Louis in Hispaniola for a French squadron under Admiral Jean du Casse, which it was believed would call at the port on his voyage to Cartagena, from where he might raid English and Dutch shipping. After Whetstone had left, Benbow took his squadron and sailed for Cartagena, anticipating that either he or Whetstone would find Du Casse and bring him to battle. On 5 August 1702, Whetstone led two warships in an attempt to capture Arecibo, Puerto Rico. Two rowboats with marines and sailors landed on Arecibo's beach, but were repulsed by 30 militiamen led by Antonio de los Reyes Correa. The landing force suffered 22 casualties on the beach while eight men on Whetstone's warships were killed or wounded by Spanish cannon fire. Whetstone proceeded to withdraw and sailed for Hispaniola, where he found Du Casse had already departed. After the action of August 1702, a wounded Benbow returned to Port Royal, meeting up with Whetstone who had returned from cruising off Hispaniola.

Benbow then ordered the trial by court martial of several of his captains for cowardice and disobedience they had shown during the action. Whetstone was president of the courts martial, Benbow being too ill to take the role himself. Benbow died on 4 November 1702, and Whetstone took over the command of the Jamaica Station. He held it until June 1703, when he was superseded by Vice-Admiral John Graydon. Whetstone went on to engage and destroy a number of privateers off San Domingo but an attempt on the French colony at Placentia had to be abandoned because of the weather, the island's defences, and sickness in the fleet. Whetstone and Graydon then departed Jamaica, with Whetstone returning to England in October 1703.

== Promotion ==
Prince George promoted Whetstone to Rear-Admiral of the Blue in January 1704. This was a measure designed to show both approval of his conduct whilst holding acting rank, and at the same time to separate him from charges arising against Graydon. The promotion caused controversy however, as it was done over the heads of other captains, including Sir James Wishart. Wishart was serving under Sir George Rooke, who threatened to resign over the issue. Wishart was then promoted to Rear-Admiral of the Blue as well, and made senior to Whetstone through antedating his commission. Whetstone was given command of a squadron in the English Channel in March 1704, and on 7 August fought a battle with the Swedish warship Öland when her captain Gustaf von Psilander refused to salute Whetstone's squadron. The English captured Öland and a Swedish convoy she was escorting but both were released following diplomatic negotiations. Whetstone was promoted to Rear-Admiral of the White on 18 January 1705 and on 17 February was made commander-in-chief of the Jamaica Station, before being knighted five days later.

He raised his flag aboard HMS Montagu and arrived at Jamaica to take up his post in mid May. He was largely thwarted though by the weakness of the ships under his command. The smaller vessels were able to take several valuable prizes, but he was not strong enough to allow him to attack any Spanish settlements. He hoped to convince the governor of Cartagena to declare in favour of King Charles, but received the reply that the governor 'knew no sovereign but King Philip’. Whetstone continued to persist though, and in 1706, he and Governor Handyside attempted to persuade the Spanish colonies at Cuba and Cartagena to declare in favour of Charles. Whetstone was relieved later that year by a squadron under William Kerr, and returned to England in December 1706.

== Final actions and fall from grace ==
Whetstone was given command of a squadron in May 1707, and ordered to operate off Dunkirk against Claude de Forbin, a dangerous corsair. In June he was ordered to escort a convoy of nineteen ships of the Muscovy Company as far as the Shetland Islands. He sailed with them until they were well past Shetland, before returning home. The convoy was later intercepted by Forbin, who was able to capture fifteen of the merchants. Though the orders were at fault for being insufficient in their scope, and Whetstone had fulfilled them in full, the Muscovy Company was outraged. A trial was held at which Whetstone was accused of leaving the ships to be attacked. The Admiralty defended him, but eventually Whetstone was made the scapegoat. He was dismissed from his command and received no further employment. He died in 1711, and was buried with at St Michael's, Bristol on 3 April 1711. He had been remarried by this time to Mary (or Maria), with whom he had a daughter, named Mary. At the time of his death, Whetstone was owed the substantial sum of £2500 by various debtors.

== Sources ==
- Cundall, Frank (1915). Historic Jamaica. West India Committee.

Military offices
Preceded by Vacant (Last held by John Graydon)	Commander-in-Chief, Jamaica Station; 1705–1706	Succeeded by William Kerr
