= HMS Yarmouth (1695) =

Ship of the line of the Royal Navy

History

Great Britain
- Name: HMS Yarmouth
- Ordered: 23 January 1691
- Builder: Nicholas Barrett, Harwich
- Launched: 7 January 1695
- Fate: Broken up, 1707 and rebuilt to 1709; finally broken up 1769.

General characteristics as built
- Class & type: 70-gun third rate ship of the line
- Tons burthen: 1,059 bm
- Length: =*150 ft 10 in (46.0 m) (gundeck); 123 ft 11 in (37.8 m) (keel)
- Beam: 40 ft 1 in (12.2 m)
- Depth of hold: 16 ft 11 in (5.2 m)
- Propulsion: Sails
- Sail plan: Full-rigged ship
- Armament: 70 guns (comprising twenty-six 24-pounders, twenty-six demi-culverins, fourteen sakers and four 6-pounders)

General characteristics after 1709 rebuild
- Class & type: 1706 Establishment 70-gun third rate ship of the line
- Tons burthen: 1,110 60/94 bm
- Length: 150 ft (45.7 m) (gundeck); 123 ft 4 in (37.6 m) (keel)
- Beam: 41 ft (12 m)
- Depth of hold: 17 ft 4 in (5.3 m)
- Armament: 70 guns: Gundeck: 26 × 24 pdrs; Upper gundeck: 26 × 12 pdrs; Quarterdeck: 14 × 6 pdrs; Forecastle: 4 × 6 pdrs

HMS Yarmouth was a 70-gun third rate ship of the line of the English Royal Navy, built for the navy by a private contractor at Harwich under the 1690 Programme, and launched in 1695.

She was commissioned in 1695 under Captain James Moodie, and joined Berkeley's squadron. She sailed to the Mediterranean in 1696. In February 1696 she was under Captain William Whetstone, and in 1697 under Captain William Clevland. In 1702 she was in service under Captain William Prother, serving with Rooke's fleet at Cadiz in 1702 before proceeding to the West Indies. She took part in the Battle of Velez-Malaga on 13 August 1704.

The Yarmouth was broken up in 1707 and rebuilt according to the 1706 Establishment by John Wicker at his Deptford private shipyard, being re-launched on 9 September 1709. She served until 1740, when she was hulked at Portsmouth, being finally broken up in 1769.
