= Jamaica Station (Royal Navy) =

Commander-in-Chief at Jamaica
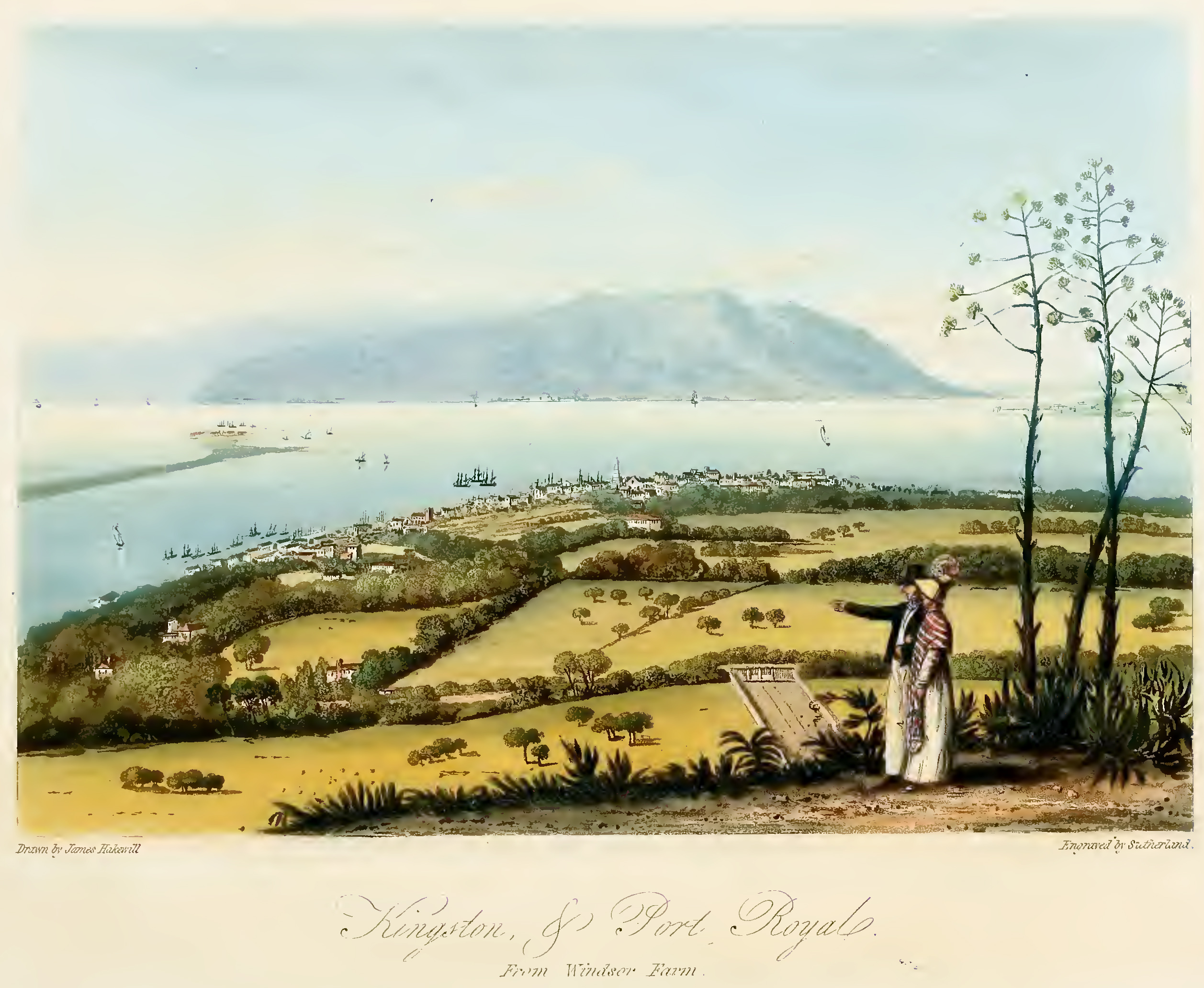
- Ships at Port Royal c. 1820
- Active: 1655–1830
- Disbanded: 1830
- Country: England; Great Britain; United Kingdom
- Branch: Royal Navy
- Type: command
- Garrison/HQ: Port Royal

The Jamaica Station was a command of the Royal Navy which existed from 1655 to 1830. Located in the British colony of Jamaica, it was headquartered at Port Royal. In 1830, the command was merged with the North America and Newfoundland Station to form the North America and West Indies Station.

== History ==
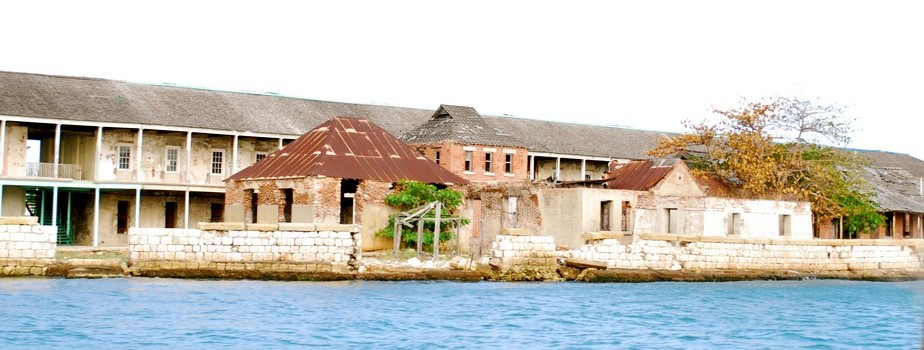
Remains of the Naval Hospital, rebuilt 1818 by Edward Holl.

The station was formed, following the capture of Jamaica, by assembling about a dozen frigates in 1655. The first "Admiral and General-at-Sea" was Sir William Penn. Its main objectives in the early years were to defend Jamaica and to harass Spanish ports and shipping. In the late 1720s three successive commanders of the station lost their lives to tropical diseases while undertaking a Blockade of Porto Bello during the Anglo-Spanish War. The general ill-health associated with the station continued throughout the century. An assessment of Navy strength at the Jamaica station in 1742 found around 3,000 men were fit to serve out of a total Navy complement of 6,620. A Navy hospital was constructed in 1745 but its location was poor and many patients brought in for shipboard diseases developed additional tropical illnesses while in the hospital itself. A report to the Admiralty in 1749 found that the hospital was "rather a hurt to the [Navy] Service than a Relief."

Salisbury was sent to the Jamaica station for a 3 year tour of duty in 1816.

The station merged with the North American Station to form the North America and West Indies Station in 1830.

The station closed in 1830, but the Royal Navy continued to operate the dockyard until it closed it in 1905. An earthquake in 1907 and hurricane in 1951 damaged the abandoned dockyard. Part of the station now houses the headquarters of the Jamaica Defence Coast Guard (HMJS Cagway, Port Royal); the rest is being restored as part of the Port Royal Heritage Tourism Project.

== Commanders-in-Chief ==
Commanders included:
No = died in post

=== Naval Commanders-in-Chief at Jamaica ===
- Vice-Admiral Sir William Penn (1655)
- Vice-Admiral William Goodsonn (1655–57)
- Vice-Admiral Christopher Myngs (1656–57)
- Colonel William Mitchell (1662)
- Vice-Admiral Christopher Myngs (1662–64)
- Captain Sir Thomas Whetstone (1663)
- Admiral Henry Morgan (1669)
- Admiral the Duke of York (1676)
- Commodore Ralph Wrenn (1692) No
- Rear-Admiral Sir Francis Wheler (1693)
- Vice-Admiral John Benbow (1702) No
- Commodore William Whetstone (1702–03)
- Vice-Admiral John Graydon (1703)
- Rear-Admiral Sir William Whetstone (1705–06)

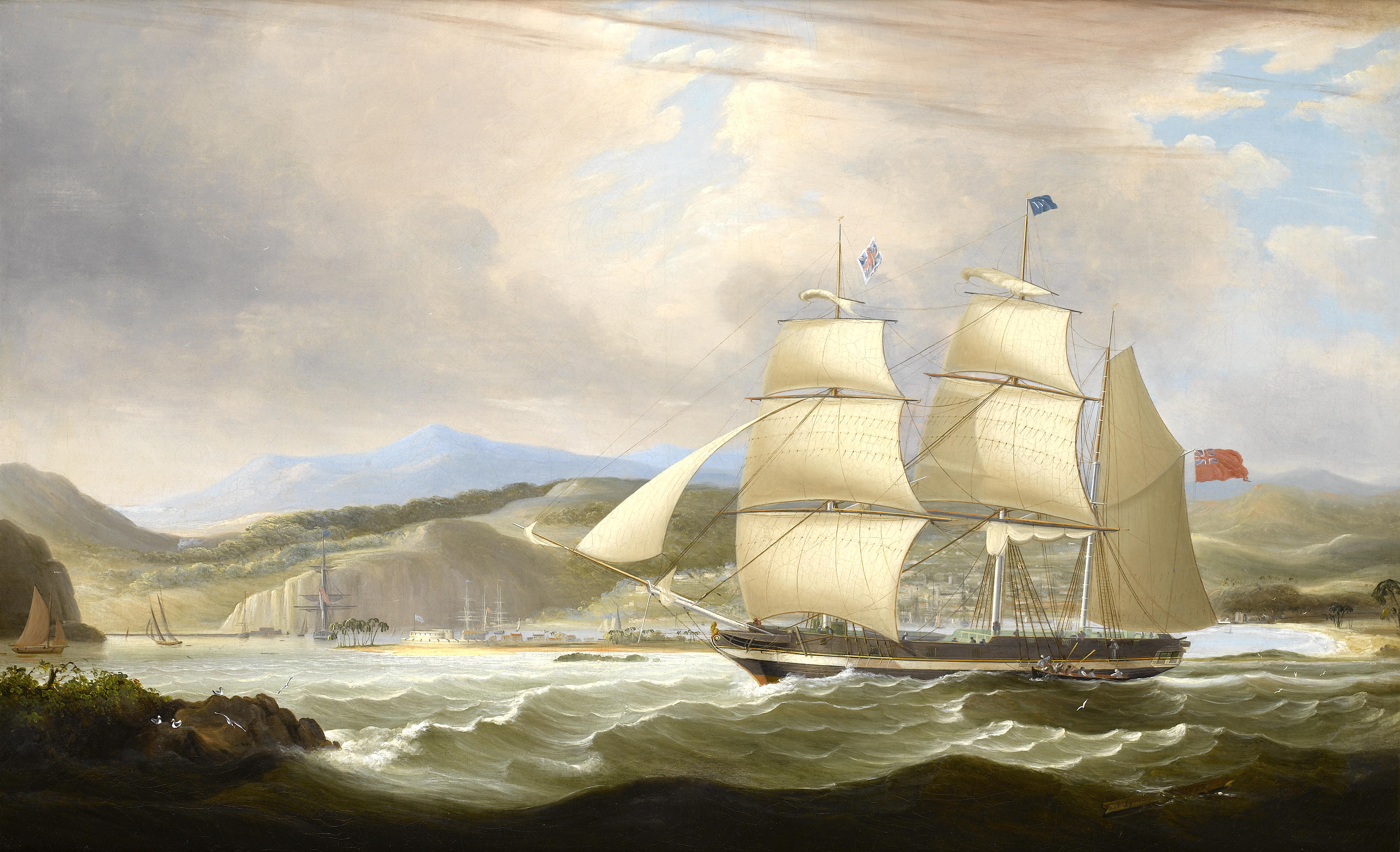
The barque Woodmansterne calling for a pilot at Port Royal

- Commodore William Kerr (1706)
- Rear-Admiral Sir John Jennings (1706)
- Rear Admiral Charles Wager (1707–09)
- Commodore James Littleton (1710–12)
- Rear-Admiral Sir Hovenden Walker (1712–13)
- Commodore Edward Vernon (1720)
- Vice-Admiral Francis Hosier (1726–27) No
- Commodore Edward St Lo (1727)
- Vice Admiral Edward Hopson (1728) No
- Rear-Admiral Edward St Lo (1728–29) No
- Commodore William Smith (1729)
- Rear-Admiral Charles Stewart (1730–32)
- Commodore Richard Lestock (1732)
- Commodore Sir Chaloner Ogle (1732–35)
- Captain Digby Dent (1736–37) No
- Commodore Sir Chaloner Ogle (1737–39)
- Admiral Edward Vernon (1739–42)
- Rear-Admiral Sir Chaloner Ogle (1742–44)
- Vice-Admiral Thomas Davers (1744–46) No
- Captain Cornelius Mitchell (1746)
- Captain Digby Dent (1747)
- Rear-Admiral Charles Knowles (1747–48)
- Captain Polycarpus Taylor (1748)
- Commodore George Townshend (1749–52)
- Rear-Admiral George Townshend (1755–57)
- Rear-Admiral Thomas Cotes (1757–60)
- Rear-Admiral Charles Holmes (1760–61) No
- Commodore Sir James Douglas (1762)
- Rear-Admiral Augustus Keppel (1762–64)
- Rear-Admiral William Burnaby (1764–66)
- Rear-Admiral William Parry (1766–69)
- Commodore Arthur Forrest (1769–70) No
- Rear-Admiral George Rodney (1771–74)
- Vice-Admiral Clark Gayton (1774–78)
- Vice-Admiral Peter Parker (1778–82)
- Vice-Admiral Joshua Rowley (1782–83)
- Vice-Admiral James Gambier (1783–84)
- Captain John Pakenham (1785)
- Captain Alan Gardner (1785)
- Rear-Admiral Alexander Innes (1786) No
- Commodore Alan Gardner (1786–89)
- Rear-Admiral Philip Affleck (1790–1793)
- Commodore John Ford (1793–95)
- Rear-Admiral William Parker (1796)
- Commodore Richard Rodney Bligh (1796)
- Vice-Admiral Sir Hyde Parker (1796–1800)
- Vice-Admiral Lord Hugh Seymour (1800–01) No
- Rear-Admiral Robert Montagu (1802)
- Vice-Admiral Sir John Duckworth (1803–04)
- Vice-Admiral James Richard Dacres (1804–08)
- Vice-Admiral Bartholomew Rowley (1809–11) No
- Commodore James Giles Vashon (1811)
- Vice-Admiral Charles Stirling (1811–12)
- Rear-Admiral William Brown (1813–14) No
- Vice-Admiral Sir Alexander Cochrane (1814–15)
- Rear-Admiral John Erskine Douglas (1816–17)
- Rear-Admiral Sir Home Riggs Popham (1817–20)
- Rear-Admiral Sir Charles Rowley (1820–23)

=== Commander-in-Chief, West Indies ===
- Commodore Edward Owen (1823)
- Vice Admiral Lawrence Halsted (1824–27)
- Vice-Admiral Charles Elphinstone Fleeming (1828–29)

== Sub commands ==
Unit	From	To	Ref
Jamaica Dockyard	1675	1829	
Port Antonio Dockyard	1729	1749	

== Sources ==
- Baugh, Daniel A. (1965). British Naval Administration in the Age of Walpole. Princeton University Press. ISBN 9780691624297.
- Bradley, Peter (2000). British Maritime Enterprise in the New World: From the Late Fifteenth to the Mid-eighteenth Century. Edwin Mellen Press. ISBN 978-0773478664.
- Cundall, Frank (1915). "Historic Jamaica : With fifty-two illustrations". archive.org. London : Published for the Institute of Jamaica by the West India Committee, pp. 28–31.
- Winfield, Rif (2007). British Warships of the Age of Sail 1793–1817: Design, Construction, Careers and Fates. Seaforth. ISBN 978-1-86176-246-7.
