= Edward Hopson =

Vice-Admiral of the White Edward Hopson
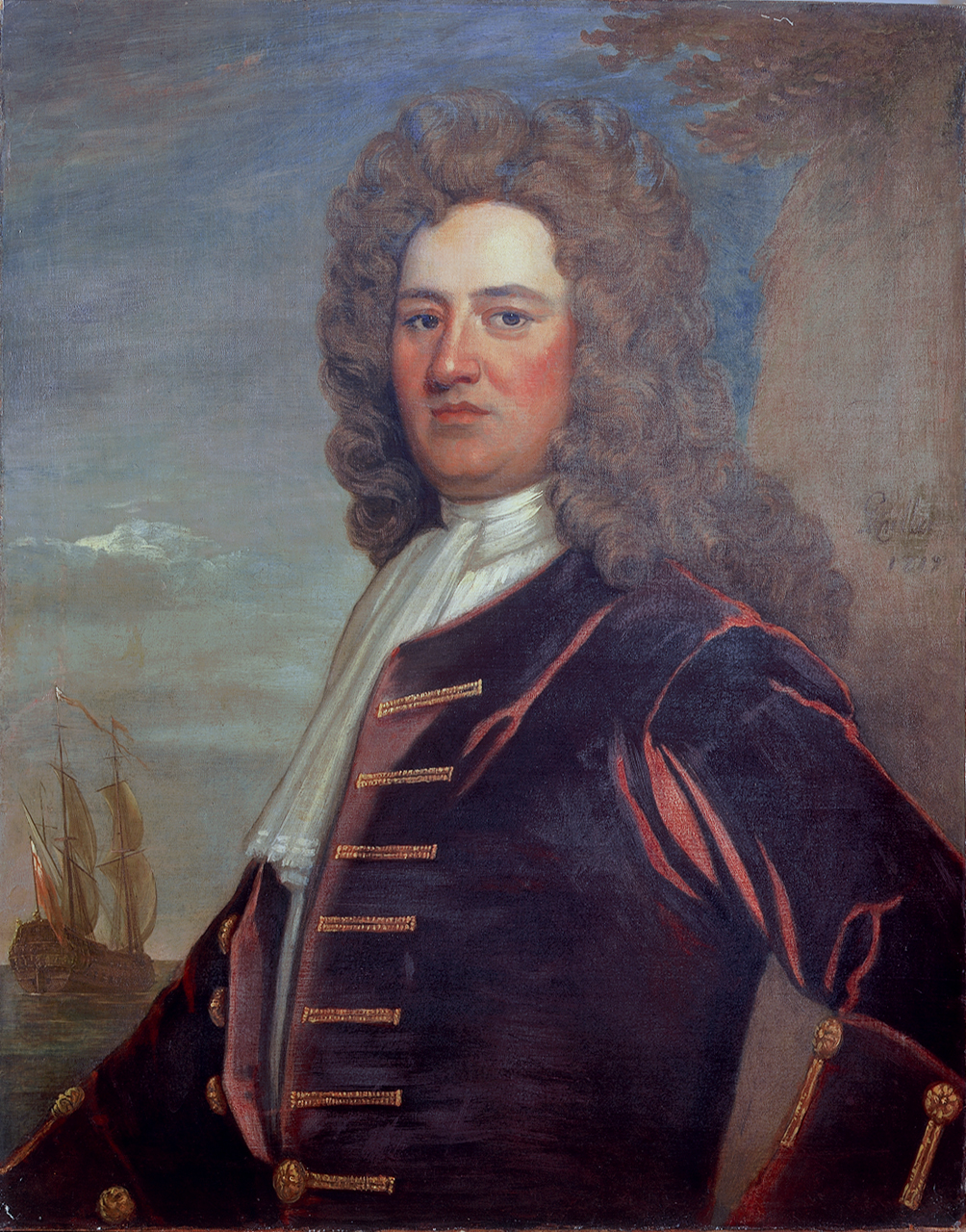
- Portrait by Sir Godfrey Kneller, 1709
- Born: 1671
- Died: 8 May 1728 (aged 56–57)
- Military career
- Allegiance: England; Great Britain
- Branch: Royal Navy
- Service years: 1681–1728
- Rank: Vice-Admiral of the White
- Commands: Thunderbolt; Mary (1660); Mary (1704); Burford; Jamaica Station
- Conflicts: War of the Spanish Succession; Anglo-Spanish War

Vice-Admiral of the White Edward Hopson (1671 – 8 May 1728) was a Royal Navy officer who served as Commander-in-Chief of the Jamaica Station.

== Origins and early career ==
Hopson was born in 1671, the son of Anthony Hopson (1640–1679), who was a gunner at Sandham Fort on the Isle of Wight and the older brother of Vice-admiral Sir Thomas Hopsonn. Edward followed his uncle into the Royal Navy on 10 January 1681 as a captain's servant on HMS Swann, and was serving under him as first lieutenant of the Breda in 1693.

On 24 July 1696 he was given his first independent command, as post captain of the fifth-rate Thunderbolt. He spent the next two years in that vessel cruising the Irish Sea. In 1702 he transferred to the command of the third-rate Mary, in which he took part in the Battle of Vigo Bay that October. The following year, Mary served as the flagship of Rear-admiral Basil Beaumont during his blockade of Dunkirk the following year. Fortunately for him, Hopson was on shore when the Great Storm of 1703 struck on 27 November. The Mary was thrown onto the Goodwin Sands and sunk with all hands.

Captain Hopson appears to have spent most of the rest of the War of the Spanish Succession stationed in the Mediterranean, in command of a newly built replacement Mary. By 1715 he was commanding the Burford, part of the fleet taken to the Baltic by Sir John Norris.

== Admiral ==
On 8 May 1719, Hopson was promoted to Rear-Admiral of the Blue, and hoisted his flag aboard the Dorsetshire. In this post, he followed Norris on three more expeditions to the Baltic, in 1719, 1720 and 1721.

He was further promoted to be Rear-Admiral of the Red on 16 February 1722, but does not appear to have been actively employed until 1726, when he took a small squadron to Gibraltar, where he joined up with another squadron under Sir John Jennings to deter possible Spanish aggression. When Jennings sailed home, Hopson took over command in the Mediterranean, and was promoted to Vice-Admiral of the Blue on 19 April 1727. With relations with Spain descending into a war, Gibraltar was reinforced by six ships under Sir Charles Wager, who took command of the post. Hopson served under him in the ensuing siege of Gibraltar.

In December 1727, Hopson was ordered to take command of the Jamaica Station, which had been left without a commander following the death of Sir Francis Hosier that August. He left Gibraltar aboard the Lion on 17 December and arrived at Jamaica on 29 January 1728 before assuming the office of commander of the Jamaica Station. During his passage across the Atlantic he was promoted to Vice-Admiral of the White. On arrival, he transferred his flag to the Leopard and continued the Blockade of Porto Bello begun by his predecessor. However, like many others in the fleet, he succumbed to tropical diseases and died on 8 May 1728.

His will, dated 13 April 1720 and proved 27 July 1728, mentions his wife Jane and one son, Edward, who was still a minor. It also mentions his mother, who was still living; and a widowed sister, Jane.

Military offices
Preceded by Edward St Lo	Commander-in-Chief, Jamaica Station; 1728	Succeeded by Edward St Lo
