= William Locker (Royal Navy officer) =

Royal Navy officer

Captain William Locker
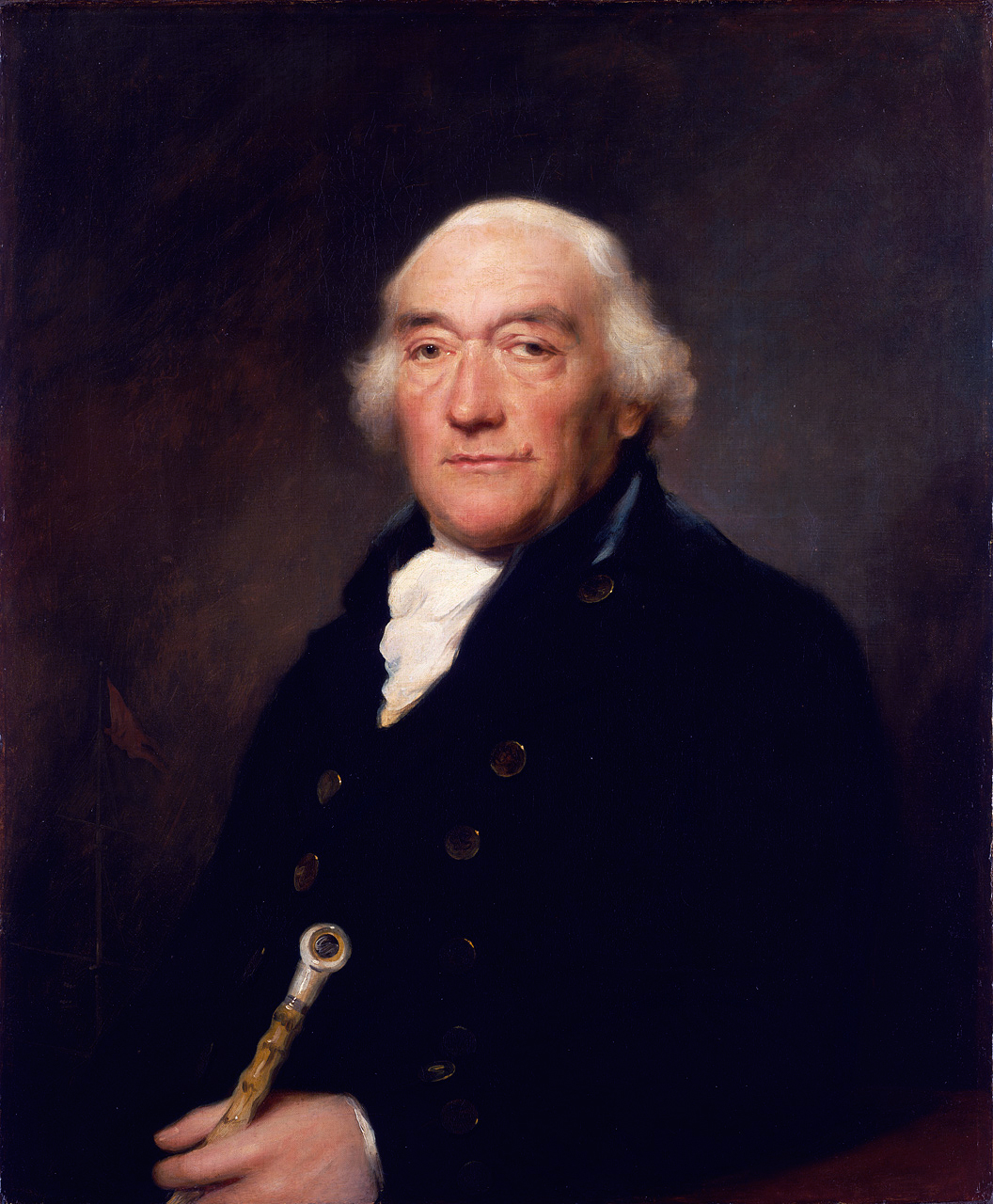
- William Locker
- Born: February 1731; Leathersellers' Hall, London
- Died: 26 December 1800; Greenwich Hospital, London
- Military career
- Allegiance: Kingdom of Great Britain
- Branch: Royal Navy
- Service years: 1746–1800
- Rank: Captain
- Commands: HMS Roman Emperor; HMS Nautilus; HMS Thames; HMS Lowestoffe; HMS Cambridge; Nore Command
- Conflicts: Battle of Quiberon Bay

William Locker (February 1731 – 26 December 1800) was an officer in the Royal Navy, who served with distinction during the eighteenth century. He rose to the rank of captain and held the posts of flag captain and commodore.

== Family and early years ==
Locker was born in February 1731 in the official residence attached to the Leathersellers' Hall, in London. He was the second son of John Locker, a Merton College, Oxford-educated barrister and commissioner of bankrupts, who served as the clerk to the company, and his wife, Elizabeth, the daughter of the physician Edward Stillingfleet. The Locker family had long been resident at Bromley (now in Kent), recorded since at least the Stuart era. Like his father, Locker attended Merchant Taylors' School and entered the Navy on 9 June 1746, at the age of 15. He initially served as a captain's servant under a family relation, Captain Charles Windham (or Wyndham) aboard HMS Kent.

After Windham's death, Locker moved aboard the Vainqueur (under a Captain James Kirk), which was bound for the West Indies. He then joined HMS Vulture, followed by HMS Cornwall. The Cornwall was the flagship of Charles Knowles, and both she and Locker were present at the capture of Port Louis. Locker then rejoined Captain Kirk, by now aboard HMS Elizabeth, and returned to England. After the end of the War of the Austrian Succession, he made two or more voyages to India and China, serving with the East India Company.

== Seven Years War ==
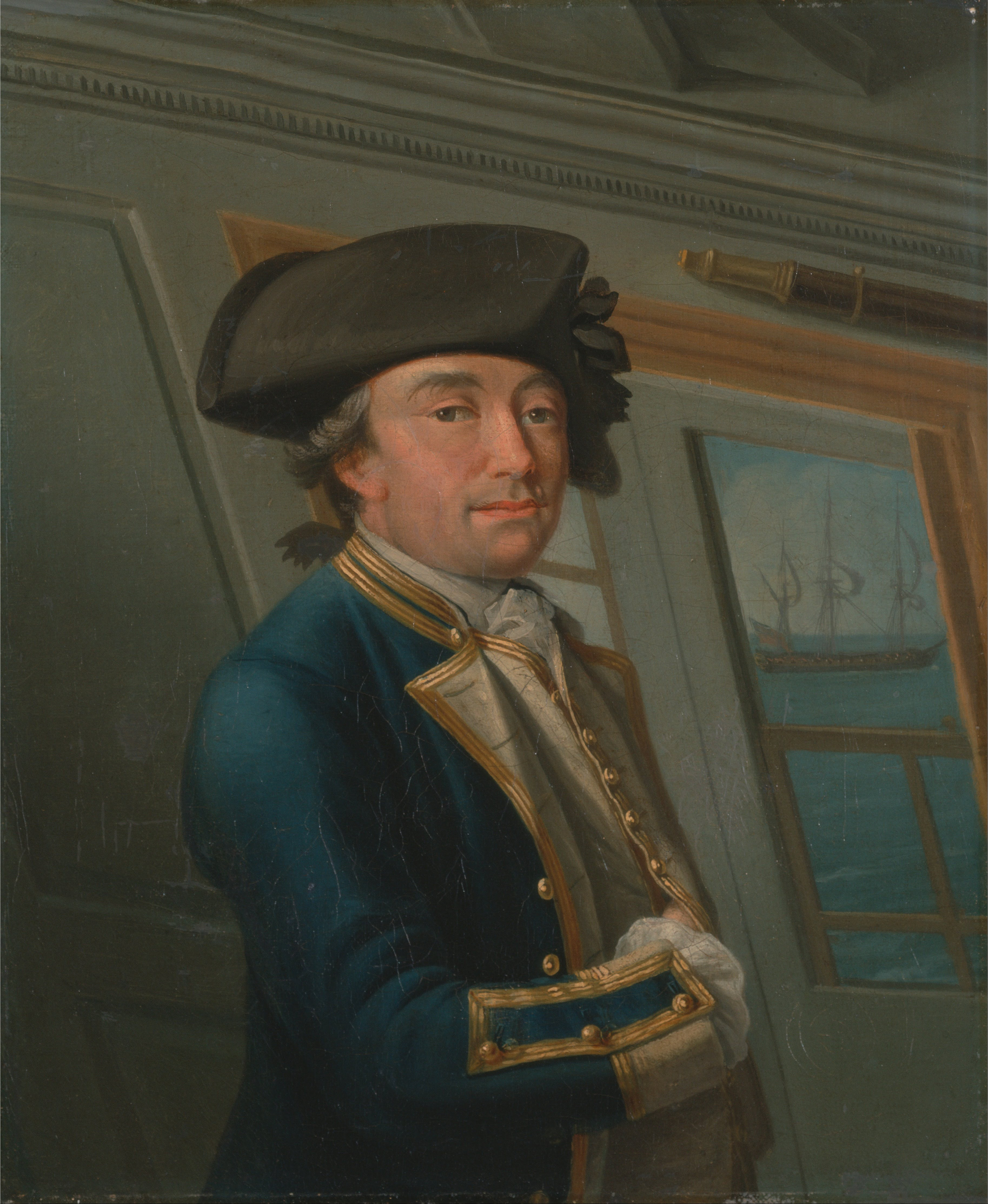
Dominic Serres - Captain William Locker

He rejoined the Navy in 1755, becoming master's mate aboard HMS St George, the flagship of Admiral Sir Edward Hawke. He was made lieutenant on 7 January 1756 and joined Hawke aboard HMS Antelope when he sailed to Gibraltar to relieve John Byng. Locker was promoted to the position of lieutenant aboard HMS Experiment, under Sir John Strachan on 4 July. Hawke seems to have had difficulty in having the appointment confirmed, but persisted, thus earning Locker's lifelong gratitude. Locker named his youngest and best-known son Edward Hawke Locker after the Admiral.

Captain Strachan was taken ill for part of his captaincy of the Experiment, and he was temporarily replaced in January 1757 by John Jervis, then a lieutenant of HMS Culloden. Locker spent two important months as Jervis' shipmate. The Experiment fought an indecisive engagement with a large French privateer on 16 March, after which Jervis returned to the Culloden and Strachan resumed command. On 8 July, whilst off Alicante, the Experiment engaged the French privateer Télémaque. Carrying a similar number of guns, but with 460 men, a far larger crew, the Télémaque attempted to use this massive numerical superiority to come alongside the Experiment and board her. After two failed attempts, the Télémaque managed to briefly come alongside, but only a few Frenchmen made it aboard and were promptly killed. Strachan then brought the Experiment alongside again and ordered Locker to lead a boarding party onto her. Locker capably did so, storming the Télémaque and carrying her. At the end of the engagement, 235 Frenchmen had been killed or wounded, for the loss of only 48 from the Experiment. Locker was one of the casualties, having been wounded in the leg. Despite it being only minor, he never fully recovered from its effects.

Both Locker and Strachan were transferred in December 1758 to the 32-gun frigate HMS Sapphire. She was attached to the fleet off Brest through summer and autumn 1759. Whilst aboard her, Locker was present at the defeat of the French at the Battle of Quiberon Bay on 20 November. After this success, Locker went aboard Hawke's flagship HMS Royal George in March 1760, and became the ship's first lieutenant in July 1761. He was promoted to his first command, that of the fire ship HMS Roman Emperor on 7 April 1762. According to his son, Edward Hawke Locker, William Locker considered this the start of his happiest period of naval service.

An appointment to command the sloop HMS Nautilus came in 1763, and he was dispatched to withdraw the British garrison from Gorée in West Africa, after the Treaty of Paris restored it to the French. Locker returned the garrison to England and then departed to take up station at Jamaica. Here he visited a number of ports in the Gulf of Mexico, and even ventured up the Mississippi River. The Nautilus was paid off at Deptford on 8 March 1768 and in a gesture of approval of Locker's services, the Admiralty promoted him to captain on 26 May 1768.

Locker then commanded the frigate HMS Thames, on the home station. He was her captain from 1770 until 1773. In 1777, he took command of HMS Lowestoffe, sailing her to the West Indies. During this period, one of his lieutenants was the newly promoted Horatio Nelson. Nelson, then barely nineteen, served with Locker for fifteen months. His experiences with Locker, and Locker's teachings had a lasting effect on Nelson. Twenty years later, on 9 February 1799, Nelson wrote to his old captain:

"I have been your scholar; it is you who taught me to board a Frenchman by your conduct when in the Experiment; it is you who always told me 'Lay a Frenchman close and you will beat him;’ and my only merit in my profession is being a good scholar. Our friendship will never end but with my life, but you have always been too partial to me."

== Later life ==
By 1779, Locker's health was declining and was invalided out of the service. By 1787, with the prospect of war with France looming, Locker was appointed to regulate the impress service at Exeter. In the Spanish armament of 1790, he was appointed to command HMS Cambridge as flag-captain to Vice-Admiral Thomas Graves. He spent a brief period as commodore and Commander-in-Chief, The Nore in 1792, and on 15 February 1793 he was appointed lieutenant-governor of Greenwich Hospital.

== Personal life and death ==
In 1770 William married Lucy, the daughter of Admiral William Parry and the granddaughter of Commodore Charles Brown. Before her death in 1780, the two had two daughters, Lucy and Elizabeth, and three sons, William, John, and Edward Hawke. The family had interests in Addington Kent, and a farm at Gillingham.

William Locker died at Greenwich Hospital on 26 December 1800. The following day Nelson wrote a letter of condolence to his eldest son, John: "The greatest consolation to us, his friends that remain, is that he has left a character for honour and honesty which none of us can surpass and very few attain." He was buried in the family vault at Addington where he had previously erected a memorial to his wife.

== Influence and the Nelson connection ==
=== Naval history ===
Locker's role at a teacher, friend and correspondent of Nelson continues to make him a source of scholarly interest. During his later years and with the assistance of his friend Admiral John Forbes, Locker began compiling material for a naval history. The material gathered was passed to John Charnock, who incorporated it into his six-volume Biographia Navalis (1794–8). Locker also suggested he write, and helped him with, his 'Life of Nelson'.

=== Art and portraits ===
Nelson was also staying with Locker at Greenwich in 1797 when, at Locker's behest, Lemuel Francis Abbott came down to make the oil study on which all his Nelson portraits were based. These eventually numbered over forty. Locker was a noted patron of the arts, having a number of portraits painted, and supporting the careers of the likes of Abbott and Robert Cleveley. He was also the driving force behind the creation of a national gallery of maritime art, suggesting the Greenwich hospital

'...should be appropriated to the service of a National Gallery of Marine Paintings, to commemorate the eminent services of the Royal Navy of England'.

He died before his vision could be realised, but it was subsequently effected by his son, Edward Hawke Locker.

== Sources ==
- William Locker's entry in the Oxford Dictionary of National Biography
- Sharman, Victor T. Nelson's Hero. The Story of his 'Sea-Daddy' Captain William Locker. Pen & Sword Books Lrd, Barnsley, UK: 2005. ISBN 1-84415-266-9

Military offices
Preceded by Richard Edwards	Commander-in-Chief, The Nore; 1792–1794	Succeeded by John Dalrymple
