= Ralph Wrenn =

English naval commodore (died 1692)

Commodore Ralph Wrenn
- Died: 26 March 1692
- Military career
- Allegiance: Kingdom of England
- Branch: Royal Navy
- Rank: Commodore
- Commands: Hopewell; Young Spragge; Nonsuch; Centurion; Mary Rose; Greenwich; Norwich; Jamaica Station

Ralph Wrenn (died 26 March 1692) was an English naval commodore.

== Naval career ==
On 18 April 1672 Wrenn was appointed commander of the Hopewell fireship, and in the following year of the Rose dogger. After the peace with the Dutch Republic he was lieutenant of the Reserve; in 1677 he had command of the fireship Young Spragge; in 1679 he was lieutenant of the Kingfisher in the Mediterranean with Morgan Kempthorne, and was so still in May 1681, when she fought a brilliant action with seven Algerine pirates.

After Kempthorne's death Wrenn took the command and beat off the enemy. His gallantry was rewarded by a promotion to the command of the Nonsuch on 9 August 1681. In May 1682 he was moved into the Centurion, to which, still in the Mediterranean, he was reappointed in May 1685. In 1687–1688, he commanded the Mary Rose, and in September 1688 he was appointed to the Greenwich, one of the ships at the Nore with Lord Dartmouth during the critical October; from this appointment he was superseded after the revolution.

In 1690, however, he was appointed to the Norwich of forty-eight guns, and in October 1691 was ordered out to the Jamaica Station. He sailed from Plymouth on 26 December, and after a most favourable passage arrived at Barbados on 16 January 1691 – 1692, when his force consisted of the Mary and, besides the Norwich, five fourth-rates, ships of from forty to fifty guns. He had orders to send one of these with the trade to Jamaica; but, receiving intelligence that the French were in greater force than had been supposed, he detached two on this duty. Then, on a report that a squadron of nine French ships was cruising off Barbados, he strengthened his force with two hired merchant ships, and put to sea on 30 January. Not meeting with the enemy in a cruise of five days, he returned to Barbados, and, apprehending that the whole French fleet had gone to Jamaica, he sailed again on 17 February. On 21 February off Desirade, he sighted the French fleet of more than three times his strength—eighteen ships of from forty to sixty guns, with some six or seven fireships and tenders. In the face of such odds, Wrenn drew back, but was the next morning attacked by their full force. After a sharp action lasting four hours, Wrenn found himself able to draw off and retire unpursued—‘the bravest action performed in the West Indies during the war’. He returned to Barbados, where a sickness carried off a great many of the men, including Wrenn himself.

== Sources ==
- Cundall, Frank (1915). Historic Jamaica. West India Committee.
- Lediard, Thomas, (1735), Naval History pp. 653–655
