= Henry Winstanley =

English painter

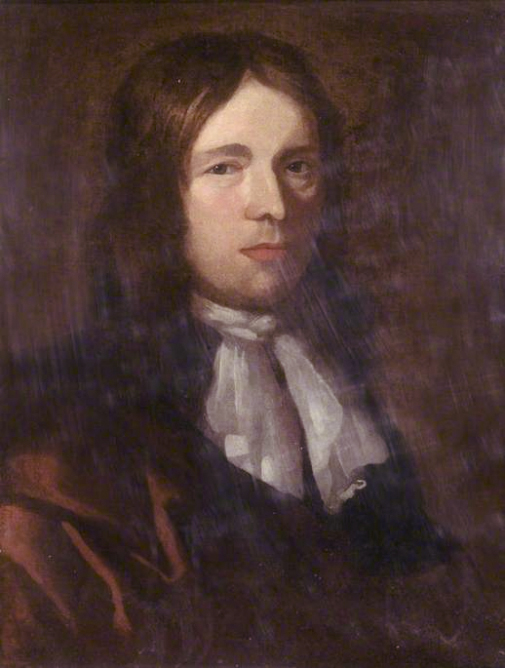
- Self-portrait, c. 1680
- Born: 31 March 1644; Saffron Walden, Essex, England
- Died: 27 November 1703 (age 59); Eddystone Rock, England
- Occupation: Engineer

Henry Winstanley (31 March 1644 – 27 November 1703) was an English painter, engineer, and merchant who constructed the first Eddystone Lighthouse after losing two of his ships on the Eddystone rocks. He died while making repairs to the lighthouse during the Great Storm of 1703 when the structure was destroyed.

== Early life and career ==
He was born in Saffron Walden, Essex, and baptised there on 31 March 1644. His father, Henry, became land steward to the Earl of Suffolk, owner of Audley End House, in 1652, and young Henry also worked at Audley End, first as a porter and then as a secretary. In 1666, Audley End House was bought by Charles II for use as a base when attending Newmarket races, and it became effectively a royal palace.

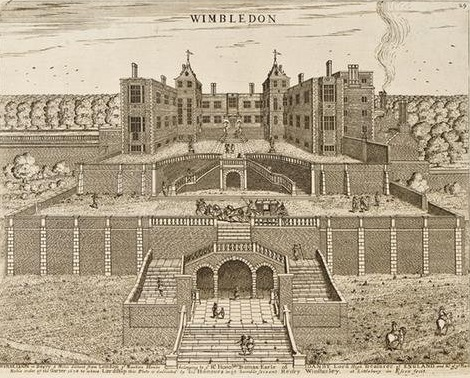
Wimbledon Palace. North front. Built 1588. Etching by Henry Winstanley 1678 for Lord Danby.

Winstanley developed an interest in engraving after a grand tour of Europe between 1669 and 1674, where he was impressed by Continental architecture and the engravings in which it was portrayed. On his return, he is believed to have studied engraving with Wenceslas Hollar and was employed at Audley End House as assistant to the Clerk of Works. In 1676, he embarked on a detailed set of architectural engravings of Audley End House, which took him ten years to complete and is a vital early record of English manor house architecture. He also designed a set of playing cards, which became very popular and sold well. He was appointed Clerk of Works at Audley End in 1679 on the death of his predecessor and held the post until 1701.

Winstanley was well known in Essex for his fascination with mechanical and hydraulic gadgets. He had a house built for him at Littlebury, which he filled with whimsical mechanisms of his design and construction, and the "Essex House of Wonders" became a local landmark that was popular with visitors. In the 1690s, he opened a Mathematical Water Theatre known as "Winstanley's Water-works" in London's Piccadilly. This commercial visitor attraction combined fireworks, perpetual fountains, automata, and ingenious mechanisms, including "The Wonderful Barrel" of 1696, serving visitors hot and cold drinks from the same equipment. It was a successful and profitable venture, operating for years after its creator's death.

== Construction of the Eddystone lighthouse ==
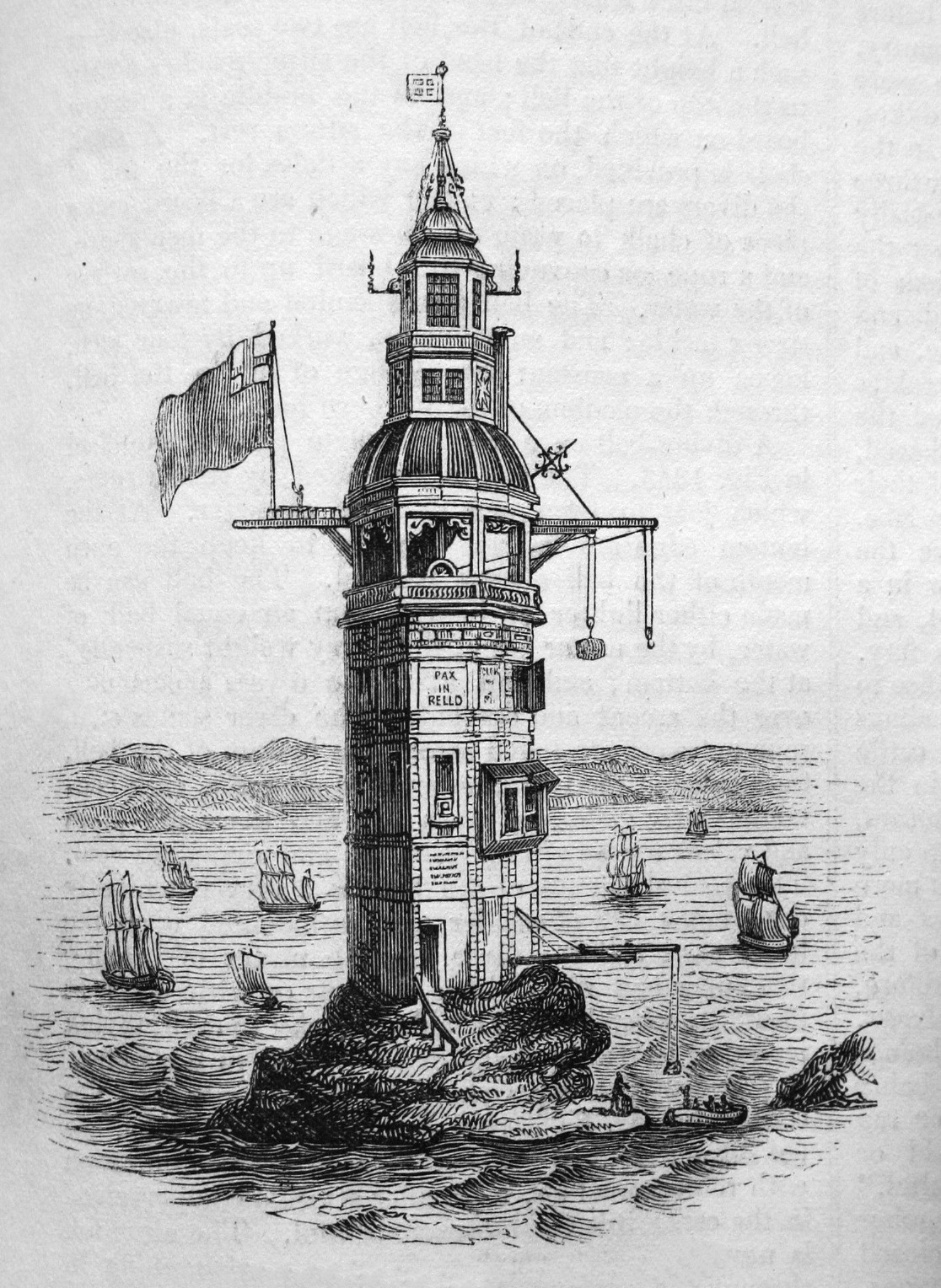
Winstanley's lighthouse, as modified in 1699

Winstanley became a merchant, investing some of the money he had made from his work and commercial enterprises in five ships. Two of them were wrecked on the Eddystone Rocks near Plymouth, and he demanded to know why nothing was done to protect vessels from this hazard. Told that the reef was too treacherous to mark, he declared that he would build a lighthouse there himself, and the Admiralty agreed to support him with ships and men.

Construction started on 14 July 1696. The octagonal tower was to be built from Cornish granite and wood, with ornamental features and a glass lantern-room in which candles would burn to provide the light, and was to be anchored to the rock by 12 huge iron stanchions. One notable incident during its construction occurred in June 1697. Britain and France were at war, and a naval vessel had been assigned to protect the workers whenever they were on the reef. On this particular day, the commissioner at Plymouth, George St Lo, ordered the ship to join the fleet and did not provide a replacement. Instead, a French privateer destroyed the work done on the foundations and carried Winstanley off to France. Louis XIV, however, ordered his immediate release, with the words: "France is at war with England, not with humanity". Winstanley returned to the Eddystone Reef, construction resumed, and the first Eddystone Lighthouse was completed in November 1698.

The lighthouse suffered some weather damage during the winter of 1698 - 1699, and the light was often obscured by spray breaking over the top of the tower. Winstanley, therefore, had it rebuilt the following spring on a larger scale, with extra stonework and even more elaborate decoration. Both lighthouses fulfilled their function. During the five years of their operation, no ships were wrecked on the Eddystone.

== Death ==
Winstanley was recorded as having expressed great faith in his construction, wishing he might be inside it during "the greatest storm there ever was". The tower was destroyed on the night of 27 November 1703, during the Great Storm of that year. Winstanley was visiting the lighthouse that night to make repairs, and he lost his life.

== See also ==
- Eddystone lighthouse
