= HMS Gosport =

Three ships of the Royal Navy have been named HMS Gosport, after the Hampshire town of Gosport, located close to the naval base at Portsmouth:

- HMS Gosport (1696) was a 32-gun fifth rate launched in 1696. She was captured by the French in 1706.
- HMS Gosport (1707) was a 44-gun fifth rate launched in 1707 and broken up in 1735.
- HMS Gosport (1741) was a 44-gun fifth rate launched in 1741 and broken up by 1768.
