= HMS Burlington (1695) =

Ship of the line of the Royal Navy

History

Great Britain
- Name: HMS Burlington
- Ordered: 16 November 1693
- Builder: Sir Henry Johnson, Blackwall Yard
- Launched: 16 September 1695
- Fate: Broken up, 1733

General characteristics
- Class & type: 50-gun fourth rate ship of the line
- Tons burthen: 680 12/94 bm
- Length: 131 ft 3 in (40.0 m) (gundeck) 109 ft (33.2 m) (gundeck)
- Beam: 34 ft 3 in (10.4 m)
- Depth of hold: 13 ft 7 in (4.1 m)
- Propulsion: Sails
- Sail plan: Full-rigged ship
- Armament: 50 guns of various weights of shot

HMS Burlington was a 50-gun fourth rate ship of the line of the Royal Navy, built by Sir Henry Johnson's Blackwall Yard, and launched on 16 September 1695 (along with her sistership, the Severn). The commercial contract had originally been agreed with Johnson on 16 November 1693 (for four ships - the Romney and Colchester, as well as the Severn and Burlington), but the latter two were delayed and a fresh contract for them agreed on 7 December 1694.

The Burlington underwent a large repair at Chatham Dockyard from 1713 to 1715, and was paid off in September 1717, and was broken up in August 1733, with a new 60-gun ship (the Augusta) being built at Deptford Dockyard to replace her.
