= HMS Advice (1712) =

Ship of the line of the Royal Navy

History

Great Britain
- Name: HMS Advice
- Builder: Allin, Deptford Dockyard
- Launched: 8 July 1712
- Renamed: HMS Milford, 1744
- Fate: Sold, 1749

General characteristics
- Class & type: 1706 Establishment 50-gun fourth rate ship of the line
- Tons burthen: 714 bm
- Length: 130 ft (39.6 m) (gundeck)
- Beam: 35 ft (10.7 m)
- Depth of hold: 14 ft (4.3 m)
- Propulsion: Sails
- Sail plan: Full-rigged ship
- Armament: 50 guns: Gundeck: 22 × 18-pounders; Upper gundeck: 22 × 9-pounders; Quarterdeck: 4 × 6-pounders; Forecastle: 2 × 6-pounders

HMS Advice was a 50-gun fourth rate ship of the line of the Royal Navy. She was built by Joseph Allin the elder according to the 1706 Establishment of dimensions at Deptford Dockyard, and launched on 8 July 1712.

In 1744, she was renamed HMS Milford and was later sold out of the Navy in 1749.
