= HMS Dartmouth (1693) =

Ship of the line of the Royal Navy

History

England
- Name: HMS Dartmouth
- Ordered: 21 June 1692
- Builder: John Shish, Rotherhithe
- Launched: 24 July 1693
- Captured: 4 February 1695, by France

France
- Acquired: 4 February 1695
- Renamed: Bourbon
- Fate: Sold to Spain in January 1700

Spain
- Acquired: 4 February 1695
- Renamed: San Juan Bautista
- Captured: 12 October 1702, by HMS Barfleur

History

England
- Name: HMS Vigo Prize
- Acquired: 12 October 1702
- Renamed: Vigo Prize
- Fate: Wrecked in the "Great Gale" in Holland, 27 November 1703

General characteristics
- Class & type: 50-gun fourth rate ship of the line
- Tons burthen: 602 84/94 bm
- Length: 122 ft (37.2 m) (on gundeck) 100 ft (30.5 m) (keel)
- Beam: 33 ft 8 in (10.3 m)
- Depth of hold: 13 ft 7 in (4.1 m)
- Propulsion: Sails
- Sail plan: Full-rigged ship
- Armament: 50 guns of various weights of shot

HMS Dartmouth was a 50-gun fourth rate ship of the line of the English Royal Navy, ordered on 21 June 1692 to be built by commercial contract with the master shipwright John Shish in Rotherhithe (one of seven such 50-gun ships ordered during 1692), and launched there on 24 July 1693.

Under the command of Captain Roger Vaughan (who was killed in the action), she was badly damaged and captured in the Western Approaches by two French 40-gun ships on 4 February 1695. The French sold her in January 1700 to Spain, who renamed her as San Juan Bautista (rating her as 48 guns and 549 toneladas in size); she served as the almiranta (2nd flagship) to a convoy in 1701, but she was re-taken by HMS Barfleur at the Battle of Vigo Bay on 12 October 1702. Upon her re-capture in 1702 she was renamed HMS Vigo Prize, as a new ship of the navy had already been commissioned as HMS Dartmouth. Her service as HMS Vigo Prize was short however, as she was wrecked in on the Dutch coast on 25 November 1703.
