= William Parry (Royal Navy officer, born 1705) =

Royal Navy officer (1705–1779)

Admiral William Parry
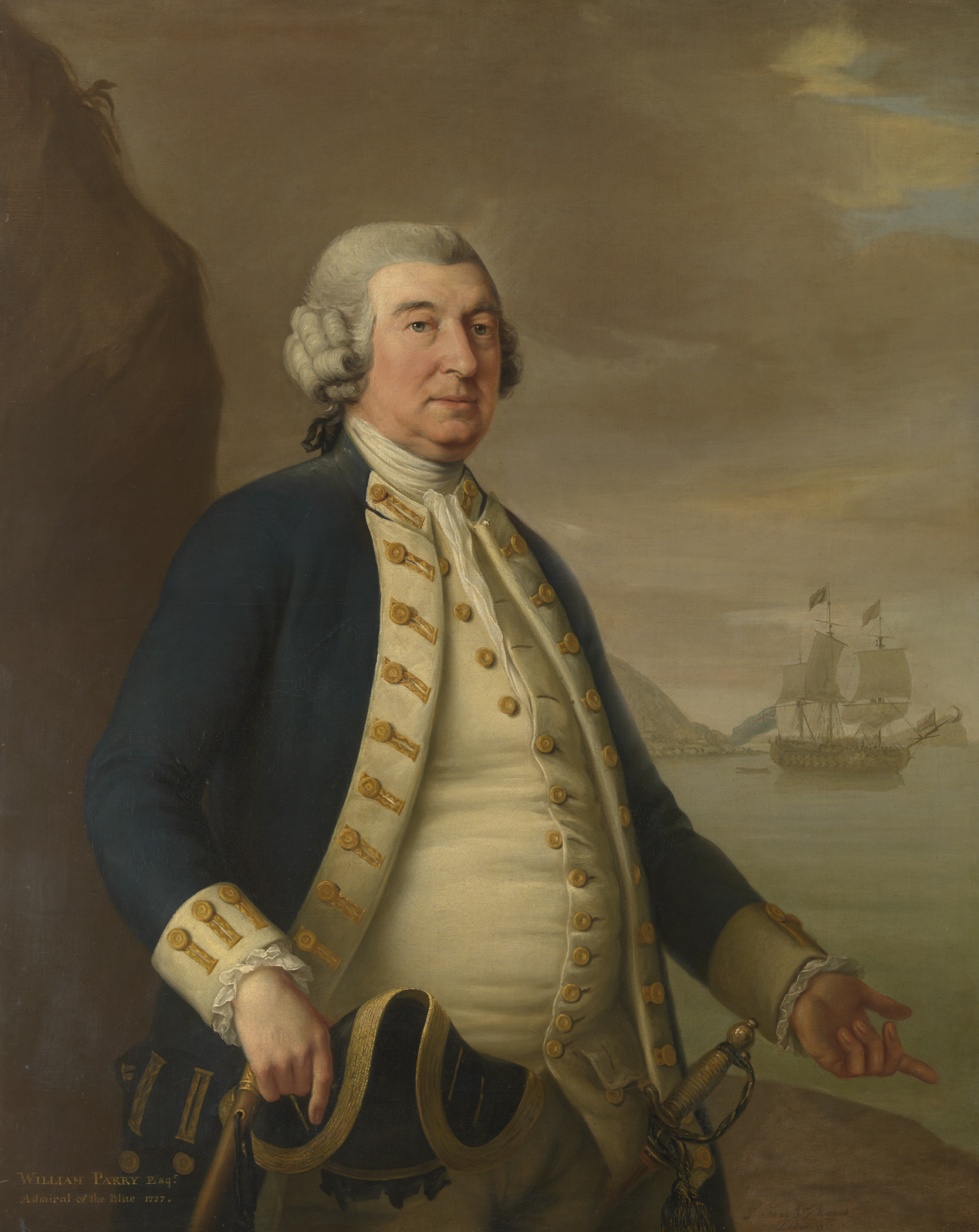
- Portrait by John Francis Rigaud, 1777
- Born: 1705
- Died: 29 April 1779 (aged 73–74)
- Military career
- Allegiance: Great Britain
- Branch: Royal Navy
- Service years: 1728–1779
- Rank: Admiral of the Blue
- Commands: HMS Granado; HMS Gibraltar; HMS Prince George; HMS Royal George; HMS Intrepid; HMS Kingston; HMS Montagu; HMS Somerset; Jamaica Station; Leeward Islands Station
- Conflicts: War of the Austrian Succession; Seven Years' War; Battle of Minorca (1756); Louisbourg Expedition (1757); Siege of Louisbourg (1758); Battle of Quiberon Bay

Admiral of the Blue William Parry (1705 – 29 April 1779) was a Royal Navy officer who served as Commander-in-Chief of the Jamaica Station.

== Life ==
Promoted to captain on 1 October 1744, Parry was given command of the fourth-rate HMS Kingston in February 1755 and saw action at the Battle of Minorca in May 1756 during the Seven Years' War. Promoted to Rear-Admiral of the Blue on 21 October 1762, he went on to be Commander-in-Chief of the Jamaica Station in 1766 and, having been promoted to Vice-Admiral of the Blue on 24 October 1770, he became Commander-in-Chief of the Leeward Islands Station in 1772. He was promoted to Admiral of the Blue on 29 January 1778. Parry married Lucy Brown, daughter of Commodore Charles Brown.

== Sources ==
- Cundall, Frank (1915). Historic Jamaica. West India Committee.
- Sharman, Victor (1990). Nelson's hero: The story of his sea-daddy Captain William Locker. Pen and Sword. ISBN 978-1844152667.

Military offices
Preceded by William Burnaby	Commander-in-Chief, Jamaica Station; 1766–1769	Succeeded by Arthur Forrest
Preceded by Robert Man	Commander-in-Chief, Leeward Islands Station; 1772–1775	Succeeded by James Young
