= HMS Gosport (1696) =

History

England
- Name: HMS Gosport
- Ordered: 3 May 1695
- Builder: William Collins, Shoreham
- Launched: 3 September 1696
- Commissioned: 1696
- Captured: 28 July 1706
- Fate: Captured by French Privateer the 54-gun Jason

General characteristics as built
- Class & type: 32-gun fifth rate
- Tons burthen: 37680/94 tons (bm)
- Length: 107 ft 9 in (32.84 m) gundeck; 89 ft 10 in (27.38 m) keel for tonnage
- Beam: 28 ft 1 in (8.56 m)
- Depth of hold: 11 ft 0 in (3.35 m)
- Propulsion: Sails
- Sail plan: Full-rigged ship
- Complement: 145/110
- Armament: as built 32 guns; 4/4 × demi-culverins (LD); 22/20 × 6-pdr guns (UD); 6/4 × 4-pdr guns (QD)

HMS Gosport was a 32-gun fifth rate built by William Collins of Shoreham in 1695/96. She spent her career on counter piracy patrols and trade protection duties in Home Waters, in North America and the West Indies. She was captured by the French in 1706.

She was the first vessel to bear the name Gosport in the English and Royal Navy.

== Construction and specifications ==
She was ordered on 3 May 1695 to be built under contract by William Collins of Shorehame. She was launched on 3 September 1696. Her dimensions were a gundeck of 107 feet 9 inches (32.84 metres) with a keel of 89 feet 10 inches (27.38 metres) for tonnage calculation with a breadth of 28 feet 1 inch (8.56 metres) and a depth of hold of 11 feet 0 inches (3.35 metres). Her builder's measure tonnage was calculated as 38462/94 tons (burthen).

The gun armament initially was four demi-culverins (Note: A demi-culverin was a gun of 3,400 pounds with a four-inch bore firing a 9.5-pound shot with an eight-pound powder charge) on the lower deck (LD) with two pair of guns per side. The upper deck (UD) battery would consist of between twenty and twenty-two 6-pounder guns (Note: A 6-pounder was a Dutch gun used to replace the saker) with ten or eleven guns per side. The gun battery would be completed by four 4-pounder guns (Note: A minion renamed the 4-pounder was a gun of 1,000 pounds with a 3.5-inch bore firing a 4-pound shot with a 4-pound powder charge.) on the quarterdeck (QD) with two to three guns per side.

== Commissioned service ==
HMS Gosport was commissioned in 1696 under the command of Captain David Greenhill for service with Captain George Mee's Squadron sent to the West Indies to reinforce Vice-Admiral John Neville. After countering the French and with the Spanish policy of non-cooperation with the English, the squadron returned to Home Waters in late 1697 under Captain Thomas Dilkes, as both Admiral Neville and Captain Mee had died. In 1701 she was under Captain Henry Crofts until his death on 16 December 1702. In 1703 she was under Lieutenant Thomas Crofts (acting Commander) and sailed to New England. In 1704 she was assigned Captain Thomas Smith as commander while in New England and then returned Home. Captain John Barter was assigned commander until his suspension in 1706. Under Captain Barter she was assigned to service in the English Channel and the Bay of Biscay. Captain Edward St Loe replaced Captain Barter in 1706 and sailed for the West Indies.

== Los ==
While in transit to Jamaica, on the 28th of July 1706 she was taken by the 54-gun Le Jason losing 20 killed with 40 wounded.
