= HMS York (1706) =

Ship of the line of the Royal Navy

History

Great Britain
- Name: HMS York
- Builder: Lock, Plymouth Dockyard
- Launched: 18 April 1706
- Fate: Sunk as a breakwater, 1750

General characteristics
- Class & type: 60-gun fourth rate ship of the line
- Tons burthen: 745
- Length: 139 ft (42.4 m) (gundeck)
- Beam: 34 ft 9 in (10.6 m)
- Depth of hold: 14 ft 7 in (4.4 m)
- Propulsion: Sails
- Sail plan: Full-rigged ship
- Armament: 60 guns of various weights of shot

HMS York was a 60-gun fourth rate ship of the line of the Royal Navy, built at Plymouth Dockyard and launched on 18 April 1706.

York was lengthened in 1738, and remained in service until 1750, when she was sunk to form part of a breakwater.
