= David Ogilvy, 6th Earl of Airlie =

David Ogilvy, de jure 6th Earl of Airlie (1725 – 1803) was a Scottish nobleman. He was known until 1761 by the courtesy title Lord Ogilvy, and from that year became Earl of Airlie only in a titular sense, since he was attainted prior to his succession to the earldom on account of his participation in the Jacobite rising of 1745.

== Early life ==
Ogilvy was born in February 1726, the eldest son of John Ogilvy, 5th Earl of Airlie and Margaret, eldest daughter and heiress of David Ogilvy of Cluny. He was educated at the university of Aberdeen, and afterwards at Edinburgh. In Edinburgh, according to one authority, he made "greater progress in what is called genteel accomplishments, such as fencing, dancing, music, etc., than in the more abstracted sciences". Before his marriage he also acquired a reputation for gallantry.

== Career ==
Standard used by Ogilvy's regiment at the Battle of Culloden.

Ogilvy joined the Jacobite rising of 1745 at Edinburgh on 3 October 1745, bringing with him over six hundred men from Angus, of whom a large number were his dependents. He was chosen as one of the council of Charles Edward Stuart, and marched south with him into England. On the retreat northwards from Derby he held the command of the cavalry. His wife Margaret Ogilvy, Lady Ogilvy, who with difficulty had been persuaded to remain in Scotland during his absence, joined the rebels near Glasgow, and henceforth shared the hardships and most of the dangers of the camp. At the Battle of Falkirk Muir she remained with the reserve, and would not be persuaded to go to Callendar House. Ogilvy's regiment formed there part of the second line, and, with that of the Atholl men, was the only portion of the second line which came into action before the enemy broke and fled. On account of the suddenness of the march northwards from Stirling, Lady Ogilvy was nearly taken prisoner, and lost some of her luggage. At Montrose some of Lord Ogilvy's men were driven out of the town by the sloop-of-war Hazard, sent there to prevent supplies coming from France.

Ogilvy's regiment fought in the second line at the Battle of Culloden. After the battle he lay for some time concealed at Cortachy, but ultimately got on board a vessel riding off the lights of Tay, and reached Norway in safety. At Bergen he was, by order of the governor, confined a prisoner in the castle on 13 May 1746, but succeeded in escaping to Sweden, from where he made his way south to France. Lady Ogilvy was not at Culloden, but remained at Inverness, where, on account of her activity in the rebellion, she was seized by order of the Duke of Cumberland, and sent in June a prisoner to Edinburgh. That November she succeeded in making her escape, and joined her husband in France, where she died in 1757, at the age of thirty-three.

Attainder of David Ogilvy (Disabilities Removed on Pardon) Act 1783
- Act of Parliament
- Parliament of Great Britain
- Long title: An Act for removing certain Disabilities and Incapacities occasioned by the Attainder of David Ogilvy of Airly Esquire.
- Citation: 23 Geo. 3. c. 34
- Territorial extent: Great Britain

Dates
- Royal assent: 17 April 1783
- Commencement: 5 December 1782 (Note: Start of session.)
- Repealed: 16 June 1977
Other legislation
Repealed by	Statute Law (Repeals) Act 1977

Status: Repealed

Text of statute as originally enacted

Lord Ogilvy obtained from the French king a regiment of foot, called Ogilvy's regiment, and ultimately he rose to the rank of lieutenant-general. For his share in the rebellion he was forfeited by Parliament in the Attainder of Earl of Kellie and Others Act 1745 (19 Geo. 2. c. 26), but, having procured a free pardon under the great seal, in 1778 he returned home. He obtained an act of Parliament, the Attainder of David Ogilvy (Disabilities Removed on Pardon) Act 1783 (23 Geo. 3. c. 34) for removing "certain disabilities and incapacities occasioned by his attainder". He was in receipt from the French king of a pension, which Napoleon Bonaparte, when he became head of the French government, offered to continue, but he declined it.

He died at Cortachy 3 March 1803.

== Personal life ==
By his first wife Margaret, daughter of Sir James Johnstone, 3rd Baronet, and niece of Patrick Murray, 5th Lord Elibank, he had a son David, his titular successor, and two daughters. By his second wife, Anne, third daughter of James Stewart of Blairhill, Perthshire, he left no issue.

According to Sir Robert Douglas, Airlie was "a nobleman of the old school, kind and indulgent to his menials and dependents, of the most correct manners, full of courtesy, integrity, and honour".

Peerage of Scotland
Preceded by John Ogilvy	Earl of Airlie; 1761–1803	Succeeded by David Ogilvy

== Attribution ==
- This article incorporates text from a publication now in the public domain: "Ogilvy, David". Dictionary of National Biography. London: Smith, Elder & Co. 1885–1900.
