= Warwickshire Hunt =

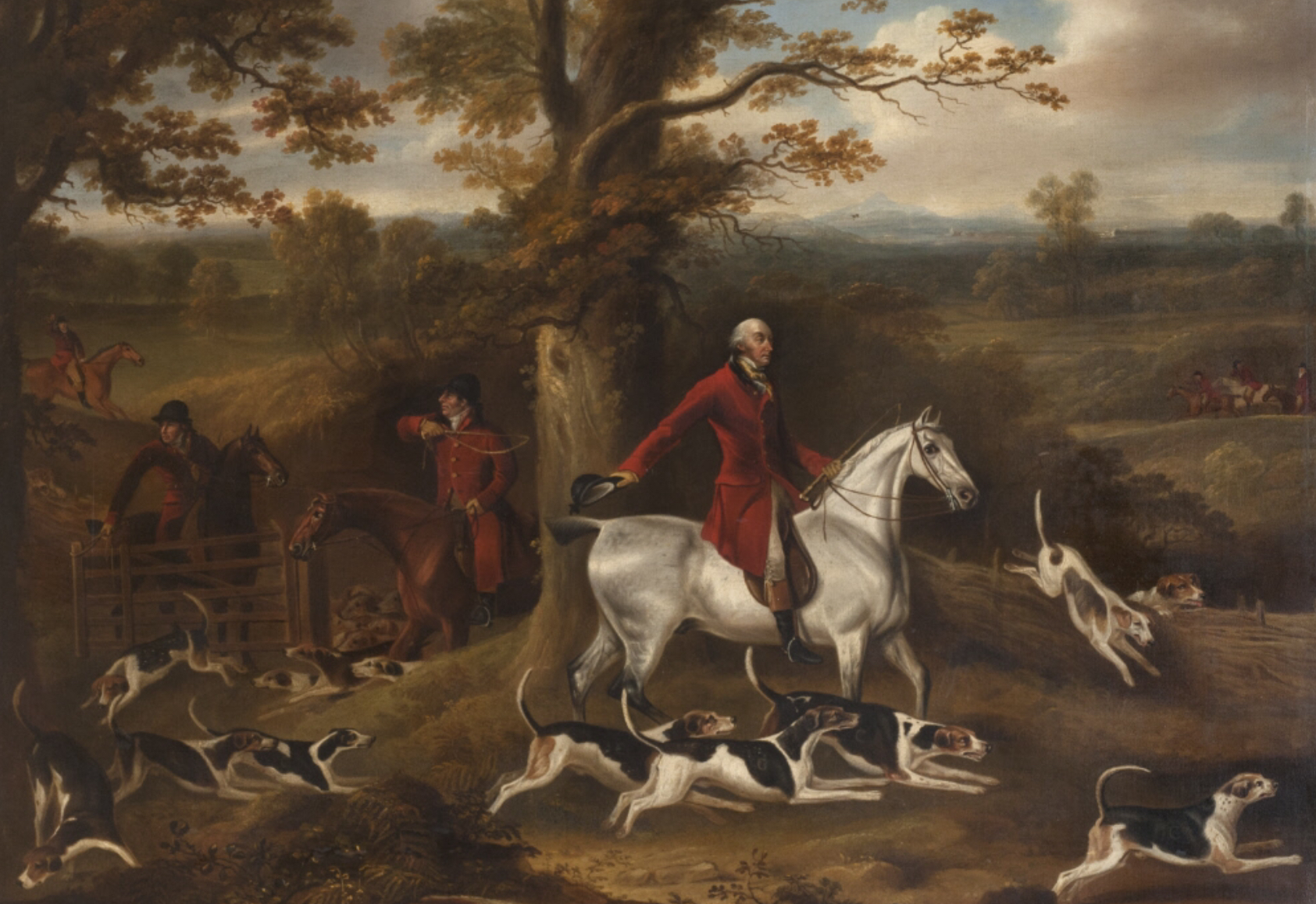
- John Corbet and the Warwickshire Foxhounds, 1812
- Hunt type: Fox hunting
- Country: England

History
- Founded: 1791
- Founded by: Mr Corbet

Hunt information
- Hound breed: Foxhound
- Hunt country: Warwickshire, Oxfordshire, Gloucestershire and Worcestershire.
- Master(s): Charmian Green, Barbara Hester, Lynne Deakin, Keith Arnold, Kim Cockburn & Simon Richards.
- Quarry: Fox
- Kennelled: Little Kineton
- Website: www.warwickshirehunt.co.uk/

The Warwickshire Hunt is an English fox hunting pack founded in 1791.

== History ==
The hunt was founded in 1791 by John Corbet of Sundorne, near Shrewsbury. John Corbet established the Hunt Club at the White Lion Inn, Stratford-upon-Avon, where once a fortnight the club’s members would meet for a dinner, during the dinner the first toast was always to "the King" and the second to "the blood of the Trojans", Trojan being a favourite hound from which most of the hunt’s hounds descended.

During this time, John Corbet hunted almost the entire county of Warwickshire with the hunt. John Corbet kenneled the pack at the White Lion during the hunting season, whilst he would return it to his seat at Sundorne Castle during the summer months. Originally the pack comprised about 70 couples of hounds (140 hounds) and were hunted in two packs, a bitch pack and a dog pack, the bitch pack being preferred by many huntsmen for their quickness of scent, and activity.

In 1811, the pack was purchased by Henry Willoughby, 6th Baron Middleton for 1200 guineas and he became master of the hunt. Lord Middleton disbanded the Hunt Club at the White Lion and divided the hunt's country with other hunts. During this period, the pack was temporarily kennelled at Kenilworth prior to Lord Middleton building a large range of stables and kennels for the pack in Stratford-upon-Avon.

In 1821 Evelyn Shirley of Ettington Hall succeeded Lord Middleton as master of the hunt after Lord Middleton suffered a nasty fall from a horse. At this time the hunt started accepting subscriptions and Mr Shirley, who was assisted by the famous huntsman Jack Wood, built a new kennel for the hunt in Butlers Marston.

The current Grade II listed kennels in Little Kineton were built in 1839. Between World War I and World War II the Warwickshire Hunt was considered one of the premier hunts in the midland shires, with a succession of famous huntsmen including Bob Champion, Ted Cox and George Gillson.

== Hunt country ==
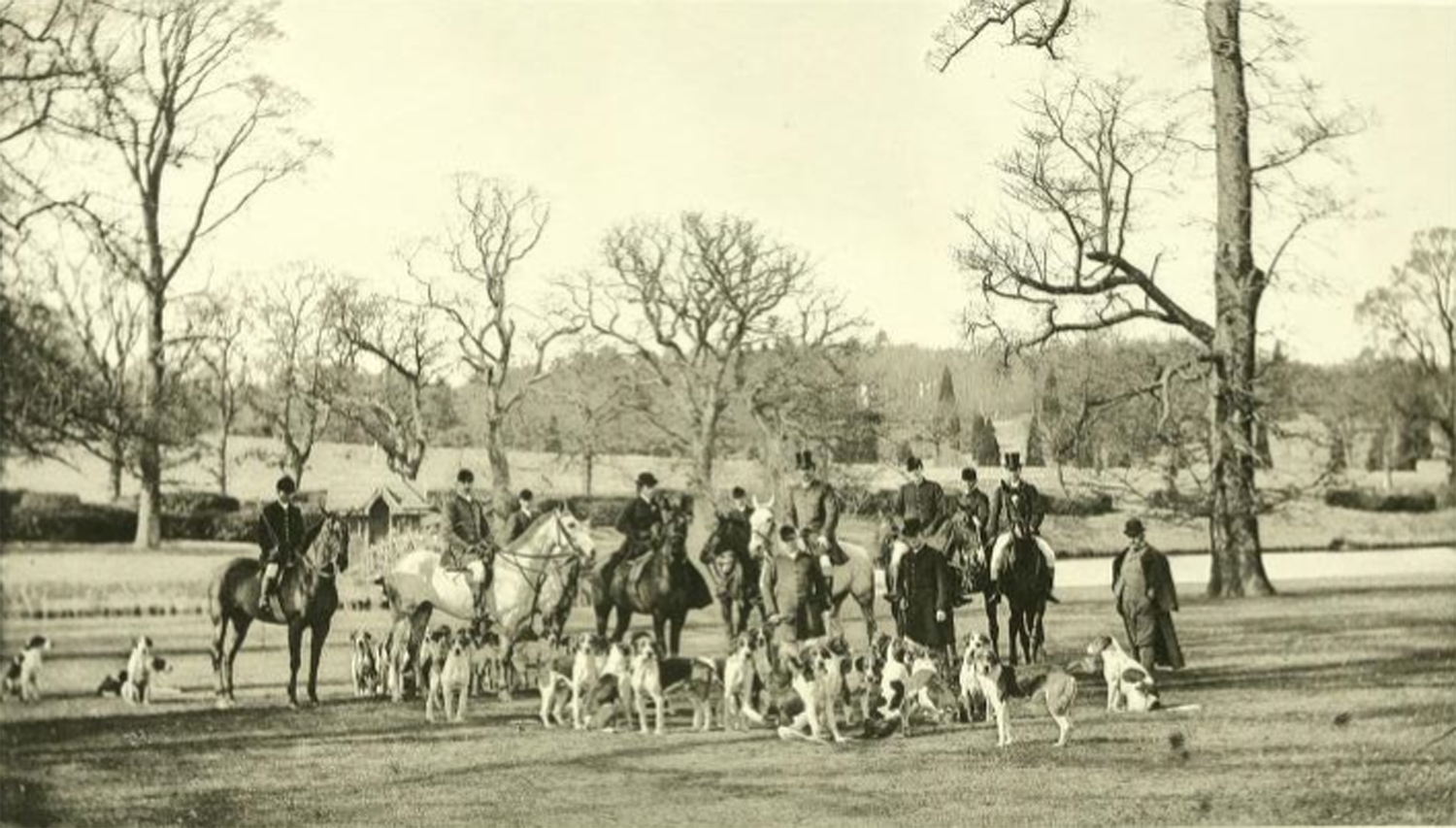
Warwickshire Hunt in 1896

The hunt’s country covers areas of Warwickshire, Oxfordshire, Gloucestershire and Worcestershire and is 21 miles (34 km) long and 24 miles (39 km) across. The country is a mixture of pasture and arable, crossed mainly by means of hedges, timber and hunt jumps.

=== Adjacent hunts ===
Adjacent hunts include the Atherstone Hunt, the Pytchley Hunt, the Bicester with Whaddon Chase Hunt, the Heythrop Hunt, the North Cotswold Hunt, the Croome and the West Warwickshire Foxhounds.

== See also ==
- Fox hunting
- List of foxhound packs of the United Kingdom
