= George Johnstone (Royal Navy officer) =

Royal Navy officer, politician and colonial administrator (1730–1787)

Captain George Johnstone
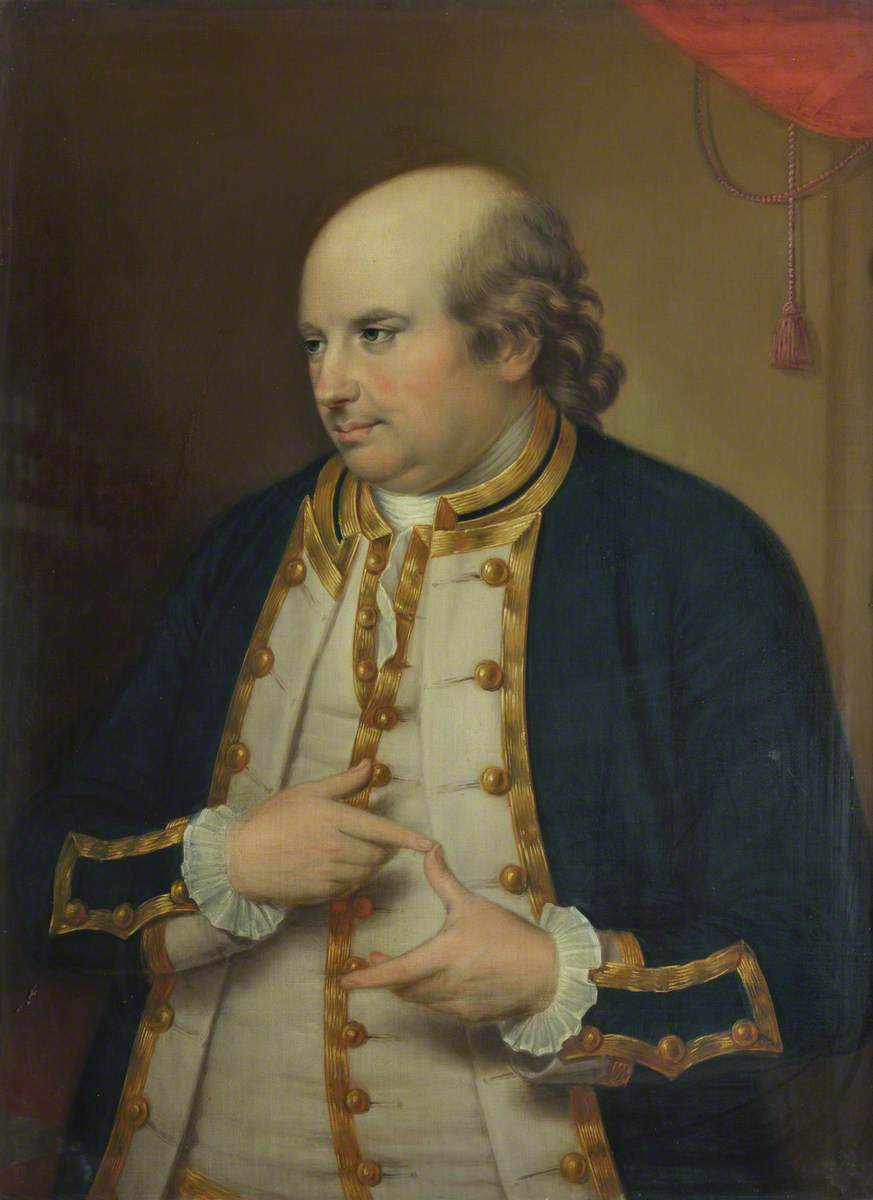

Governor of West Florida
- In office October 1764 – January 1767
- Preceded by: Robert Farmar
- Succeeded by: Montfort Browne

Personal details
- Born: 1730 Dumfriesshire, Scotland
- Died: 24 May 1787 (aged 56–57) Hotwells, Bristol
- Relations: Sir James Johnstone (father); James Johnstone (brother); John Johnstone (brother); William Johnstone (brother); George Johnstone (son); John Lowther Johnstone (son)

Military service
- Allegiance: Great Britain
- Branch/service: Royal Navy
- Years of service: 1744–1787
- Rank: Captain
- Commands: HMS Hornet; HMS Hind; HMS Romney; Lisbon Station
- Battles/wars: War of the Austrian Succession; Seven Years' War; Battle of Cap-Français; American War of Independence; Battle of Porto Praya; Battle of Saldanha Bay (1781)

Captain George Johnstone (1730 – 24 May 1787) was a Royal Navy officer, politician and colonial administrator who served in the War of the Austrian Succession, the Seven Years' War and the American War of Independence. In a multifaceted career he was also a member of parliament, a director of the East India Company, a member of the Carlisle Peace Commission and the governor of West Florida from 1763 until 1767.

Johnstone was born into a Scottish gentry family in 1730, and embarked on a naval career. Early in his service there occurred several incidents which revealed both positive and negative aspects of his character. In several naval engagements Johnstone was praised for his bravery, and incidents where he was censured for disobedience. He rose through the ranks to his own commands and had some success with small cruisers against French merchantmen and privateers. After the end of the Seven Years' War he had made friends with several powerful figures, and was appointed governor of West Florida. He achieved a measure of success in the delicate operations of running a new colony, but ultimately clashed with his political masters and failed to cultivate support amongst the wider sections of colonial society. Returning to Britain he became active in politics, supporting conciliatory measures for the Americans, and the removal of government interference from the affairs of the East India Company. His stance on the former led to his appointment as a member of the Carlisle Peace Commission, but he was accused of offering bribes and the Americans would have nothing to do with him.

Returning to active naval service with a lucrative posting as commodore, he cruised with success off Portugal, and was then entrusted with a secret mission to capture the Dutch Cape Colony. While en route to the colony, he was surprised by a French fleet sent to thwart his goal, and though he fought it off at the Battle of Porto Praya, he allowed the French to push on and reinforce the Cape Colony. Thwarted in his mission, he had some consolation in discovering a valuable fleet of Dutch East Indiamen, and capturing most of them. Returning to politics in England after the war he spoke on a number of issues, but was not asked to join an administration. He became a director of the East India Company towards the end of his life, before illness forced him to retire from business and politics shortly before his death in 1787.

== Family and early life ==
George Johnstone was born in 1730 in Dumfriesshire the fourth son of Sir James Johnstone, 3rd Baronet of Westerhall, Dumfries, and his wife Barbara Murray, the oldest sister of the literary patron Patrick Murray, 5th Lord Elibank. He was a younger brother of William Johnstone (later Sir William Pulteney) and Margaret Ogilvy, and an older brother of the East India Company (EIC) official John Johnstone (1734–1795).

== War of the Austrian Succession and Seven Years' War ==
He began his career at sea in the Merchant Navy, then entered the Royal Navy in 1746. He served in the War of the Austrian Succession, spending some time aboard HMS Canterbury, where he gained a reputation for bravery for an instance when he boarded a French fire ship so that it could be towed away from a British squadron off Port Louis, Hispaniola. He spent some time as a midshipman aboard HMS Lark under Captain John Crookshanks. For reasons unknown Crookshanks refused to grant Johnstone his certificate, upon which Johnstone challenged him to a duel. The challenge being accepted, the two duelled and Crookshanks was wounded in the neck. The end of the war in 1748 left him without active employment, though he passed his lieutenant's examination in 1749. He spent some time in the merchant service during the years of peace, captaining at least one merchant vessel to the Caribbean. He was recalled to the navy at his new rank on the outbreak of the Seven Years' War, serving aboard HMS Bideford. He was however soon court-martialed for "insubordination and disobedience", and though he was found guilty his record of gallantry in combat was taken into account, and he was given a reprimand in 1757 and ordered to resume his duties.

Johnstone went on to serve aboard HMS Dreadnought, seeing action at the Battle of Cap-Français on 21 October 1757 and receiving praise for his bravery from the squadron's commander, Commodore Arthur Forrest. Johnstone however made an enemy of Rear-Admiral Thomas Cotes as a result of a dispute over prize money. His combative nature was also demonstrated in 1758 when, while serving as first lieutenant aboard HMS Trial, he demanded a court martial of his captain Thomas Cookson for alleged incompetence in sailing the ship. The proposed court martial was dismissed out of hand by Admiralty. Despite these incidents, Johnstone was briefly made acting captain of the 70-gun HMS Essex in June 1759.

By 1759 Johnstone, by now in poor health, found himself without a ship. After a period of delays, the first Lord of the Admiralty George Anson, 1st Baron Anson gave him his first command, the 14-gun sloop HMS Hornet. She was initially assigned to carry out escort duties in the North Sea, during one of which Johnstone was faced with a mutiny, which he skilfully put down with minimal loss of life. Hornet was then ordered to Lisbon. On the voyage, Johnstone captured several prizes, and took several more after his arrival. Among them was the 8-gun privateer Chevalier D’Artesay off Granville on 8 January 1761, followed by the 6-gun privateer Société on 15 January. He was then sent to inform Admiral George Rodney in January 1762 of the British declaration of war against Spain. Rodney was able to use this early notice to capture a number of valuable prizes, before the Spanish in the region became aware that they were at war. Johnstone was promoted to post-captain in May 1762, shortly before the end of the Seven Years' War. On 11 August 1762 he received command of the 24-gun HMS Hind. He was appointed to the 24-gun HMS Wager before the end of the year, but received a new commission before he could take it up.

== Governor of West Florida ==
1767 map of West Florida

Johnstone was appointed governor of West Florida in November 1763 by the Prime Minister, John Stuart, 3rd Earl of Bute. Johnstone was friends at the time with the dramatist and fellow Scot John Home, who was Bute's secretary. Johnstone was one of several Scots appointed by Bute to govern all four of the new British colonies, which provoked much criticism from the opposition. Johnstone became notorious for cudgelling a writer for The North Briton over his comments on Bute's appointments. Johnstone took up his position eagerly, feeling that his new province's strategic location would give it a profitable future, and envisaging West Florida as 'The Emporium of the New World'.

He arrived at his capital, Pensacola, on 21 October 1764 and having established himself, went on to encourage immigration while keeping order among a relatively lawless pioneer population. He carried out skilful negotiations with the local Indians, and established the basics of civil government in the region. He oversaw the establishment of a fairly effective provincial legislative assembly, and the elections of representatives to it, which he worked well enough with to be able to pass a number of pieces of legislation. He did not enjoy a similar relationship with the military in society, through his claim of an authority over them which was contrary to usual colonial practice. By 1766 he had determined on the necessity of war with the Creek Indians, despite the government's attempts to secure peace in North America. He soon clashed with William Petty, 2nd Earl of Shelburne, the new Secretary of State for the Southern Department, which led to Shelburne's demand for Johnstone's removal. By now Johnstone had been frustrated in his hopes for commercial prosperity in the region, and enjoyed little popular support from civil society, and so decided to apply for a leave of absence. He left the colony on 13 January 1767, and never returned. Shortly after his departure the Chatham ministry removed him from his office. During his time in Florida he had begun a long-term relationship with Martha Ford, by whom he had four illegitimate children, all of whom he supported: George Lindsay Johnstone (later a member of Parliament), James Primrose Johnstone, Alexander Johnstone and Sophia Johnstone.

== British politics ==
Johnstone returned to Britain in 1767, where he once more became involved in the politics of the East India Company. He had previously been one of a number of his family to support Robert Clive, 1st Baron Clive in 1764, but by 1767 Clive was persecuting George's brother John Johnstone, who was at this time a member of the EIC's council in Bengal. George Johnstone spoke out and voted against Clive, gaining a reputation as an orator. He sought election to Parliament on the back of this reputation, and after securing the patronage of Sir James Lowther was elected to represent Cockermouth in 1768. He became part of the parliamentary group supporting Lowther's interests, and retained his membership after his election to the constituency of Appleby in 1774. He continued to be active in the politics of the EIC, using his parliamentary position to make speeches attacking the North ministry's schemes for Indian reform, and laying the blame for the chaos in Bengal at Clive's door. He found favour for doing so with the East India Company's court of proprietors, who made him chair of a proprietary committee aiming to block plans for reforming the EIC. Despite these efforts Prime Minister Lord North was able to pass an act regulating the East India Company in 1773.

Johnstone supported the Rockingham faction, which was opposed to North's policies in American affairs. He was particularly skilled at denunciations and obstructing legislation, attacking the 1773 Tea Act as 'criminally absurd', and argued that the Boston Port Bill would unite Americans against Britain. He also opposed the altering of the charter of Massachusetts and the 1774 Quebec Act. Other matters he spoke on in Parliament included his opposition to the Irish penal laws, the imprisonment of debtors and the Royal Navy's use of impressment. He also criticised the slave trade between the Miskito people and British merchants, calling it "a commerce... of the most barbarous and cruel kind that ever disgraced the transactions of any civilised people". He tended towards pragmatism on other affairs, believing that while taxing American colonists was legal, it was inexpedient, and that sending British troops to America would be ultimately fruitless and that to maintain order would require the garrisoning of forces in the colonies at great expense. Instead he urged conciliation to redress colonial grievances. His temper occasionally got the better of him, leading to difficult situations, and on one occasion a duel with Lord George Germain.

== The Carlisle Peace Commission ==
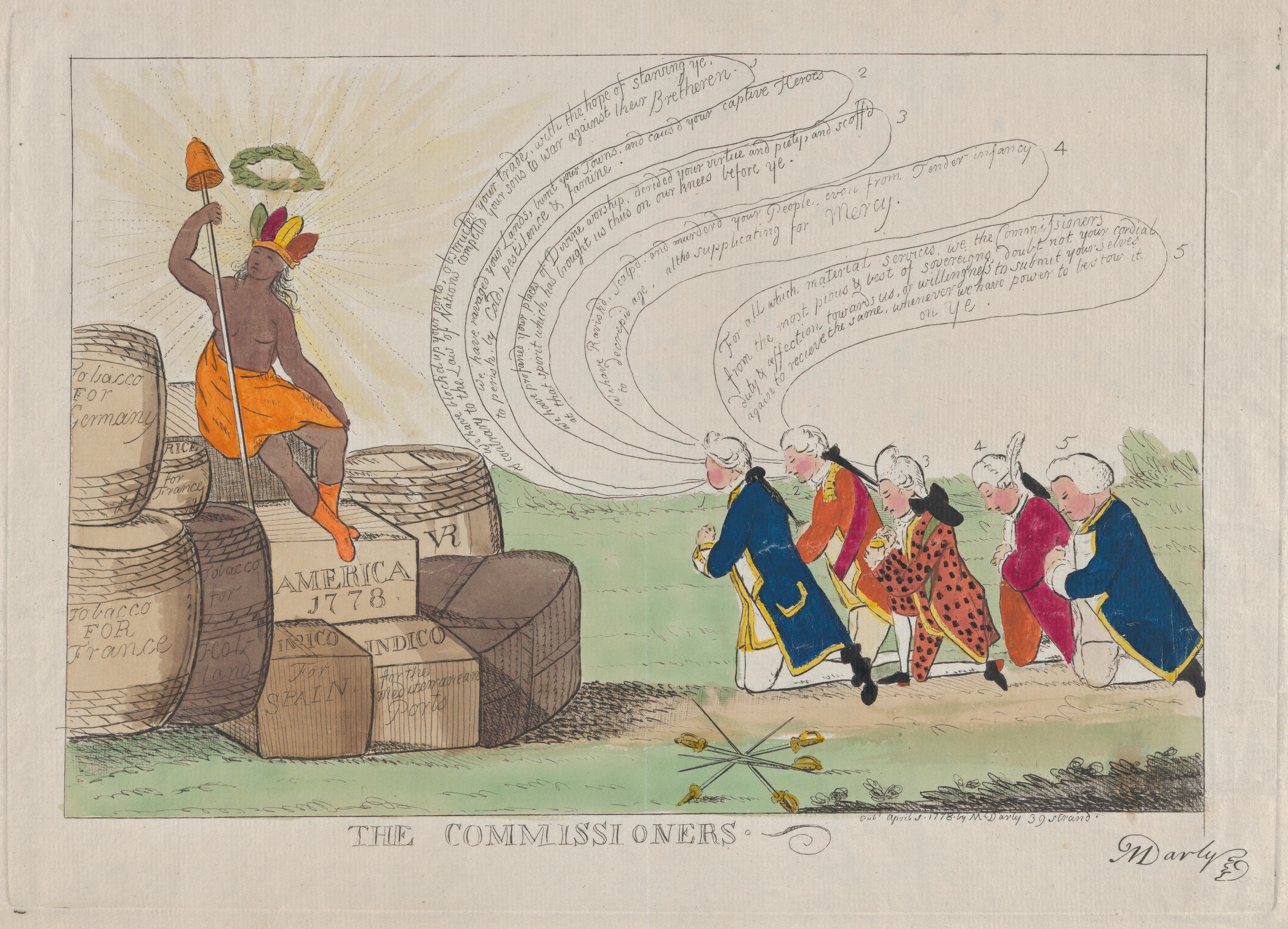
Cartoon mocking the Carlisle Peace Commission; Johnstone is depicted first from right

Johnstone's stance on conciliation probably led to his selection by North to form part of the peace commission sent to America in 1778 under Frederick Howard, 5th Earl of Carlisle. Confident of success Johnstone attempted to sway influential Americans with the argument that reconciling with Britain was preferable to dependence on France. In his communications he made vague hints of rewards to those who helped secure this outcome, and was eventually accused of attempting to bribe American general Joseph Reed with 10,000 guineas. The charge was never proved, but the Continental Congress voted to have nothing more to do with him, and Johnstone returned home in 1778, before the rest of the commissioners.

== Return to the Navy ==
In 1779 Johnstone was offered and accepted a posting as commodore of the Lisbon Station, despite his previous attacks on the North ministry and support for conciliation with the American rebels. He justified himself with the argument that since France had entered the war on the American side, he could no longer support staying out of the war. Johnstone was promised an assignment on the Portuguese station, before which he cruised off the French coast in his flagship HMS Romney, looking for evidence of invasion preparations. It soon became known that the French and Spanish fleets intended to unite and form a large single fleet to invade England. Johnstone took Romney to join Admiral of the White Sir Charles Hardy's Channel Fleet, and pressed him to seek battle. Hardy instead preferred to avoid action at first, wearing down the Franco-Spanish fleet at sea while his own continued to refit and resupply from the naval bases along the English coast. Hardy's tactics were successful, and rather than confront a fresh and well-equipped British fleet, the Franco-Spanish fleet abandoned their plans and returned to French ports.

Johnstone went on to cruise off the Portuguese coast, making several captures that brought him a sizeable sum of prize money. In particular Romney, while cruising with HMS Tartar and HMS Rattlesnake, chased down and captured the 34-gun Spanish frigate Santa Margarita on 11 November 1779. The following year his ships captured the 38-gun Artois on 3 July 1780, and the 18-gun Perle on 6 July 1780, both off Cape Finisterre. Despite these successes he still tried to maintain his influence in politics, suggesting that Spain be offered Gibraltar in exchange for leaving the war, but achieved no apparent backing or result.

== Assignment to the Cape ==
Johnstone was then given command of a squadron that was assigned to carry out an expedition to the River Plate, but in 1780 the Dutch entered the war against Britain and allied with France. Immediately Dutch possessions around the world became valuable targets for the British, and taking advantage of Johnstone's expedition, it was quickly reinforced with more warships, transports and East Indiamen, and assigned to carry out a secret expedition to capture the Dutch Cape Colony. Johnstone sailed on his expedition from Spithead on 13 March 1781 in command of 46 ships, including five ships of the line (the 74-gun HMS Hero, the 64-gun HMS Monmouth, and the 50-gun HMS Isis, HMS Jupiter and HMS Romney), four frigates (the 38-gun HMS Apollo, the 36-gun HMS Jason, HMS Active and the 28-gun HMS Diana), the fireship HMS Infernal and the bomb vessel HMS Terror. He also had seven light armed cruisers, two cutters and a sloop to serve as despatch vessels, four transports, eight storeships, and thirteen Indiamen. Also with the expedition were 3,000 troops under General Sir William Medows. The expedition at first went well, with the cutter HMS Rattlesnake capturing a Dutch merchant ship on the fourth day out of port. However the French had learned of the expedition's intent through the services of the spy François Henri de la Motte, based in London, and quickly prepared an expedition under Admiral Pierre André de Suffren to foil Johnstone by beating him to the Cape Colony and reinforcing it.^{[a]}

=== Battle of Porto Praya ===
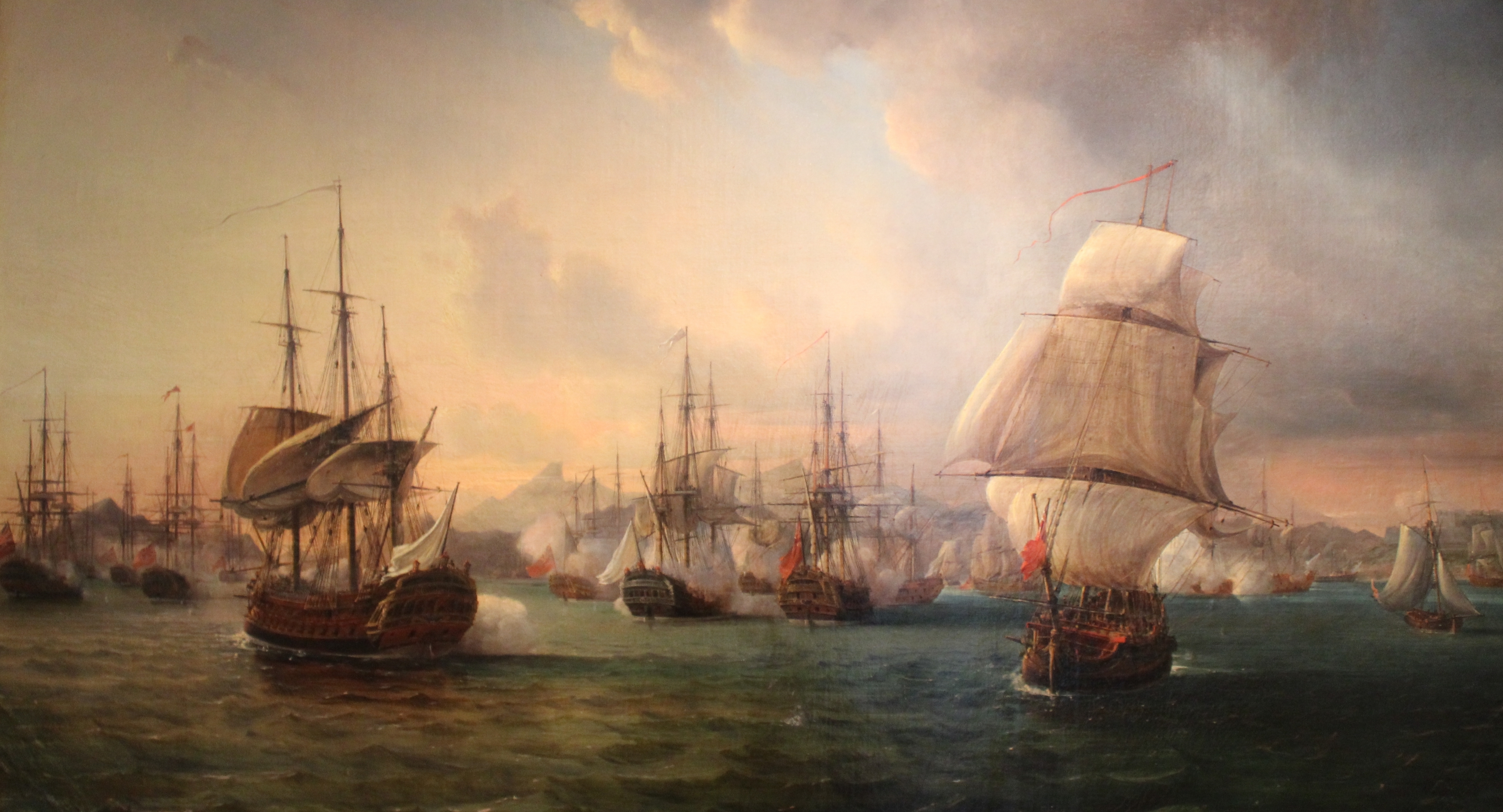
The Battle of Porto Praya

Johnstone at first made for the Cape Verde Islands, anchoring at Porto Praya to take on fresh water. Assuming there was no danger, despite records from the port office that a French frigate had arrived a month earlier and warned the inhabitants to prepare for the arrival of a larger French force, Johnstone anchored his fleet so that the warships were moored inshore, and the transports and merchants were outside the defensive lines. He further hampered his ability to fight his ships by sending his best men ashore to collect water, and leaving his decks encumbered with lumber and casks. On 16 April strange sails were seen approaching the harbour. These were the ships of Suffren's squadron, who also intended to take on water and was equally as surprised to discover the British fleet. Taking advantage of the situation he quickly ran up to HMS Isis with his 74-gun ships Annibal and Héros, and the 64-gun Artésien, fired broadsides into her, and raised the French colours. Moored as he was Johnstone could not easily bring his remaining warships to engage the French, while his smaller ships were useless against the large French warships. In the smoke and confusion several of the transports fired into the East Indiamen.

Recovering from their initial shock the British soon began to fight back effectively. Captain Ward of HMS Hero took men from nearby ships and used them to bring his ship into range of the French, whereupon he boarded Artésien, killed her captain, Cardaillac, and took 25 members of the ship's crew prisoner. After two hours of heavy cannonading the French found themselves in a dangerous position, as Annibal lost her mizzen mast, followed shortly afterwards by her main and foremasts. She had by now sustained casualties of two hundred dead or wounded, and with the British preparing to board her, Suffren decided to retreat. He brought Héros in to tow Annibal to safety and made for the open sea, taking with him as prizes the East Indiamen Hinchinbroke and Fortitude, the fireship Infernal, and the storeship Edward.

Johnstone immediately ordered a pursuit, but his heavily damaged ships took some time to get out of the harbour, by which time Suffren's fleet had disappeared. The British ships taken by Suffren were all recaptured over the next few days, as they were considered too badly damaged to be of use and were abandoned. Though Johnstone had beaten off the superior French force, the race was now on for the Cape Colony. Johnstone assumed that Suffren would either make for the West Indies or Brazil to refit and resupply, but was mistaken. Suffren simply rigged temporary masts on Annibal and made for the Cape Colony. Johnstone stayed at Porto Praya to carry out repairs, thus abandoning any chance of beating Suffren to his destination.

== Arrival at the Cape Colony and Saldanha Bay ==
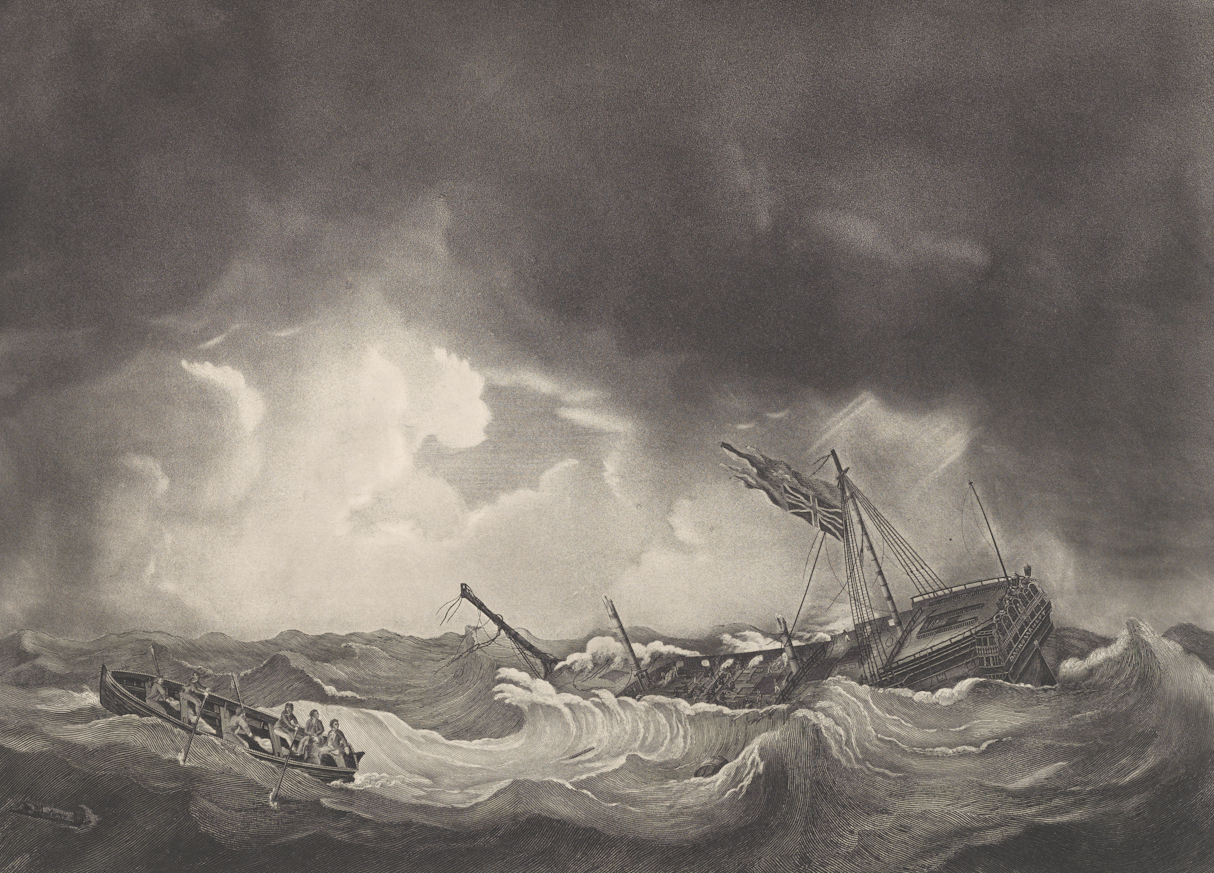
Dankbaarheid, captured by Johnstone's squadron at the Battle of Saldanha Bay, foundering on 30 January 1782

Johnstone's squadron arrived off the Dutch Cape Colony, where he sent HMS Active ahead to reconnoitre. Active found a Dutch merchant, the Held Woltemande, which had recently departed the Cape Colony, and after fooling her into thinking Active was a French frigate, captured her. From her Johnstone learnt that Suffren's forces had already reinforced the Cape Colony, and that an attack would be futile. However he also learnt that a small convoy of richly laden Dutch merchants had been moved to the safety of Saldanha Bay. Johnstone decided to capture them, and on the morning of 21 July, arrived off the entrance to the bay. The Dutch squadron consisted of Dankbaarheid, Perel, Schoonkop, Hoogscarspel and Middleburg, under the command of Captain Gerrit Harmeyer of Hoogscarspel. Their stores and equipment had been stored on the packets Zon and Snelheid, which were sent further into the bay, near to Schapen Island. They had been given orders to burn their ships if attacked, while even if they were captured, the loss of their equipment on Zon and Snelheid would make them useless. However the Dutch were largely unprepared, and only on Middleburg had stores of combustible material been prepared. They cut their anchor cables and ran onshore, where their crews set fire to them, but the British were able to board them in their boats and extinguished the fires on all but Middleburg, to which Johnstone personally attached a line to, repeating the success of his youth, and had towed away from the remaining Dutch ships. The five ships fell into British hands, as did the two packets, which were captured without any attempt being made to destroy them. After equipping his ships, Johnstone left the bay with his prizes, leaving only Zon and Snelheid, which were considered too old to be of any use.

Having failed in his objective to capture the Cape Colony, Johnstone decided to send the troops and supplies on to the East Indies station, detaching his best warships under Captain James Alms of HMS Monmouth to escort them, while he returned to Britain with the ships Romney, Jupiter, Diana, Jason, Terror, Infernal, one light cruiser, two victuallers, and the Dutch prizes. He stopped on his voyage home at Lisbon, where he married Charlotte Dee, daughter of the British vice-consul, on 31 January 1782.

== Aftermath and return to politics ==
Johnstone attempted to place much of the blame for his delay in chasing the French on a subordinate, Captain Evelyn Sutton of HMS Isis, and deprived him of his command and substantial prize money. Sutton was arrested and court-martialed, but acquitted. In response Sutton brought a suit against his former commander. Johnstone had to contest this suit, protracted by appeals, for the rest of his life, with it only being settled in his favour two days before his death. Johnstone was by now probably suffering from Hodgkin lymphoma, which may have been responsible for some of his lapses in judgement. He was elected as member of parliament for Lostwithiel in 1781, and continued to be an active member, opposing American independence, and government interference in the running of the East India Company. He opposed Charles James Fox's proposals for tighter controls on the EIC, but in a move contrary to his earlier views, supported William Pitt the Younger's scheme. Pitt's was more moderate than Fox's, allowing the East India Company's directors to retain power over the EIC's appointments, and Johnstone may have made a deal with Pitt to support this measure in exchange for Pitt's supporting Johnstone's bid to be elected as a director of the East India Company, which he achieved in 1784. The two did not collaborate closely after this, and Pitt neither brought him into his government, nor offered him a pocket borough to represent in the 1784 general election. Johnstone instead attempted to win the seat of Haddington Burghs, but was defeated. He contested Ilchester the following year, but was again defeated. After a petition however his opponent John Harcourt was declared not to have been elected, and Johnstone was elected in his stead.^{[b]} By now in poor health Johnstone remained only a year in Parliament, before applying for Chiltern Hundreds in 1787 to resign his seat.

== Death and legacy ==
George Johnstone died at Hotwells in Bristol, possibly from Hodgkin lymphoma, on 24 May 1787. He was survived by his wife Charlotte, by whom he had one son, John Lowther Johnstone. He also had four illegitimate children, including George Johnstone (1764–1813), who became an MP.

John later succeeded his uncle, Sir William Pulteney Johnstone, as 6th Baronet of Westerhall. George Johnstone had achieved small-scale success as a naval officer, serving with undoubted courage, but had not been able to succeed when given a major command. His poor strategic planning had led to his force being badly surprised at Porto Praya, and despite having rallied and successfully beaten off the French, his assumption that Suffren would not head immediately to the Dutch Cape Colony proved his undoing and handed the French an important strategic victory. He achieved some successes as governor of West Florida, despite ultimately failing to win the support of his political masters and the wider civil society, and would later rate his time in Florida more highly than his comparatively greater success as a director of the East India Company. He was a renowned orator when speaking in opposition, but was never asked to join an administration and several of the high-profile causes he supported ultimately failed.

== Notes ==
a. de la Motte was later uncovered, and tried for treason. Found guilty, he was executed at Tyburn on 27 July 1781.

b. The death of sitting MP Peregrine Cust on 2 January 1785 forced a by-election. Harcourt was declared duly elected by a majority of 17 votes when the polls closed after five days on 9 February (118 votes to 101), but a petition led to an investigation that uncovered evidence of bribery and corruption. Harcourt was declared not to have been elected, and Johnstone took the seat in his stead.

== Citations ==
Parliament of Great Britain
Preceded by Charles Jenkinson; Sir George Macartney	Member of Parliament for Cockermouth; 1768–1775; With: Sir George Macartney to 1769; Sir James Lowther 1769–74; Fletcher Norton 1774–75	Succeeded by Ralph Gowland; James Adair
Preceded by Fletcher Norton the younger Philip Honywood	Member of Parliament for Appleby; 1774–1780; With: Philip Honywood	Succeeded by William Lowther; Philip Honywood
Preceded by Hon. John St John; Hon. Thomas de Grey	Member of Parliament for Lostwithiel; December 1780 – 1784; With: Hon. Thomas de Grey to 1781; Viscount Malden 1781–84	Succeeded by John Sinclair; John Thomas Ellis
Preceded by John Harcourt; Benjamin Bond-Hopkins	Member of Parliament for Ilchester; 1786–1787; With: Benjamin Bond-Hopkins	Succeeded by George Sumner; Benjamin Bond-Hopkins
Political offices
Preceded by Manuel de Montiano as Governor of Spanish Florida	Governor of West Florida; 1763–1767	Succeeded by Montfort Browne
