= John Corbet of Sundorne =

John Corbet
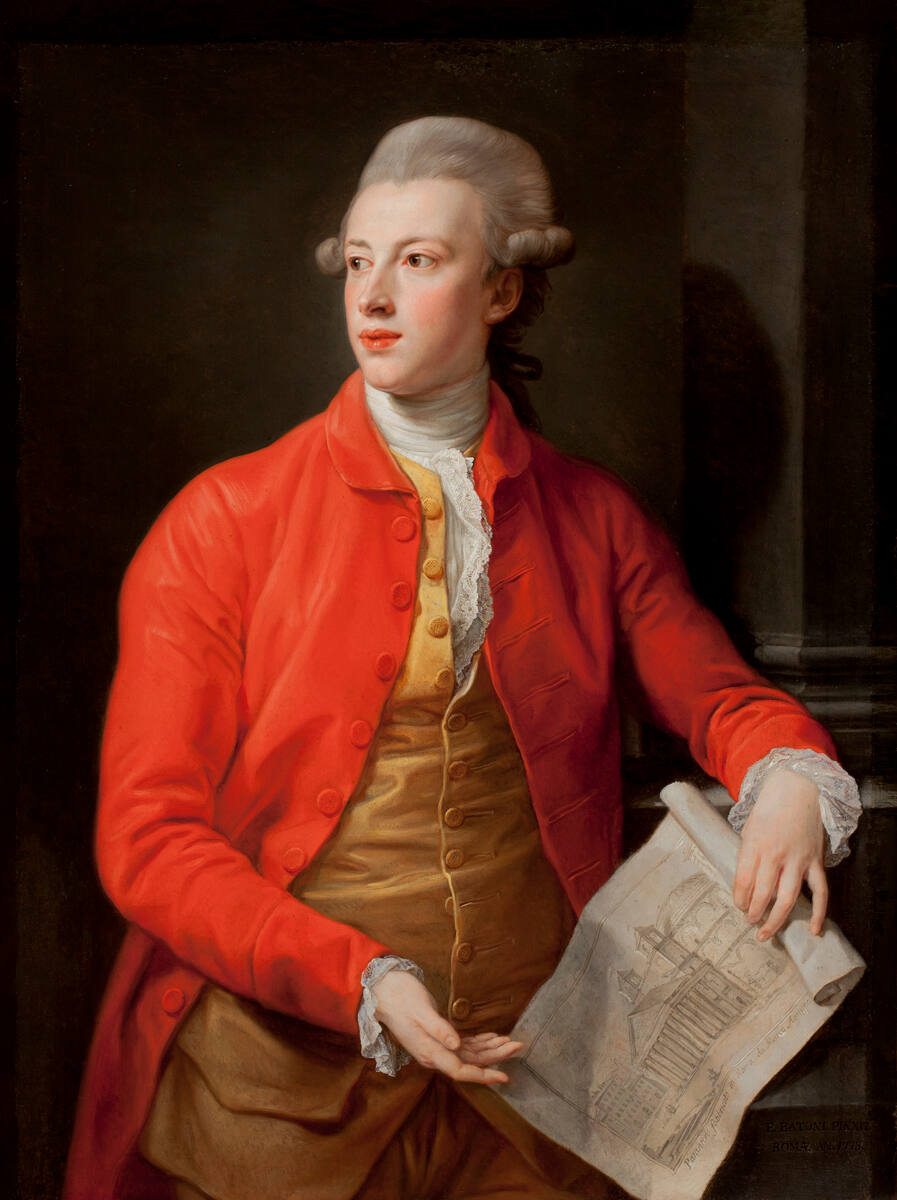
- John Corbet of Sundorne Castle, Shrewsbury, painting by Pompeo Batoni, 1773.
- Born: 1751
- Died: 19 May 1817 (aged 65–66); Mudeford, Dorset
- Resting place: St Mary Magdalene's Church, Battlefield
- Occupation: Member of Parliament of Great Britain
- Years active: 1775–1780
- Known for: Master of Foxhounds of the Warwickshire Hunt
- Spouses: Emma Elizabeth Corbet (née Leighton); Anne Corbet (née Pigott)
- Children: Emma Elizabeth; Louisa; Matilda; John Kynaston; Jane Elizabeth; Andrew William; Annabella; Dryden Robert; Vincent; Kynaston

John Corbet (1751–1817) of Sundorne, was an English sportsman of the Shropshire landed gentry and politician who sat in the House of Commons from 1775 to 1780.

== Family and inheritance ==
John Corbet was born into the wealthy Corbet family, who trace their ancestry to a Roger Corbet, a Norman who accompanied William I in his conquest of England. Corbet's father, also John Corbet, had inherited Sundorne Estate from his brother Andrew, who died unmarried in 1741.

John Corbet's mother, Barbara Letitia Mytton, daughter of John Mytton of Halston, was his father's second wife. Corbet had a brother Andrew Corbet, who rose to Lieutenant Colonel in the Royal Horse Guards, and a sister Mary Elizabeth Corbet, who married Sir John Kynaston Powell, 1st Baronet. Corbet inherited Sundorne Estate after the death of his father in 1759. He matriculated at Pembroke College, Oxford on 7 January 1770 aged 18.

== Public life ==
John Corbet led an active public life in Shrewsbury and throughout Shropshire. In 1775 he was Treasurer of the Salop Infirmary in Shrewsbury, he served as Lieutenant Colonel of the Shropshire Militia and in 1793 he was High Sheriff of Shropshire.

Corbet's estate at Sundorne was within several miles of Shrewsbury, which gave him an interest in the constituency. On 17 March 1775, following the death of Lord Clive, he was returned unopposed at a by-election as Member of Parliament for Shrewsbury. There is no record of his having spoken in Parliament and he did not stand again at the 1780 general election.

== Warwickshire Hunt ==
John Corbet was a keen fox hunter and in 1791 he founded the Warwickshire Hunt, with which he hunted almost the whole county of Warwickshire. Corbet personally covered almost all of the hunt's expenses, requesting only a £5 contribution from each member towards earth stopping. He established a Hunt Club at the White Lion Inn, Stratford-upon-Avon, where once a fortnight the club's members would meet for a dinner. During the dinner the first toast was always to "the King" and the second to "the blood of the Trojans", Trojan being a favourite hound from which most of the hunt's hounds descended. During the hunting season, the pack was kept at the White Lion, and in the summer it returned to Sundorne.

In John Corbet's time, the Warwickshire hunt was very well supported by the nobility of Warwickshire. On the first Monday of November of every year, John Peyto-Verney, 14th Baron Willoughby de Broke of Compton Verney would host a dinner for the club's members at the White Lion to mark the beginning of the hunting season. Other staunch supporters of the hunt included Heneage Finch, 4th Earl of Aylesford, Thomas Scott, 2nd Earl of Clonmell and Henry Greville, 3rd Earl of Warwick.

In 1810, John Corbet's health began to fail and following the entreaties of his family, he agreed to give away his prized pack of hounds. In 1811, he sold the pack, at the time consisting of over 70 couples of hounds (140 hounds), for 1,200 guineas to Henry Willoughby, 6th Baron Middleton. With the cheque for the money, Lord Middleton included a note to Corbet in which he stated he saw the transaction as more of a gift than a purchase.

John Corbet was extremely popular throughout Warwickshire, particularly with the farmers whose country he hunted over and to whom he was renowned for his generosity. For many years after his death a print of him, mounted on a white horse with hounds at foot, was found in many houses throughout the county.

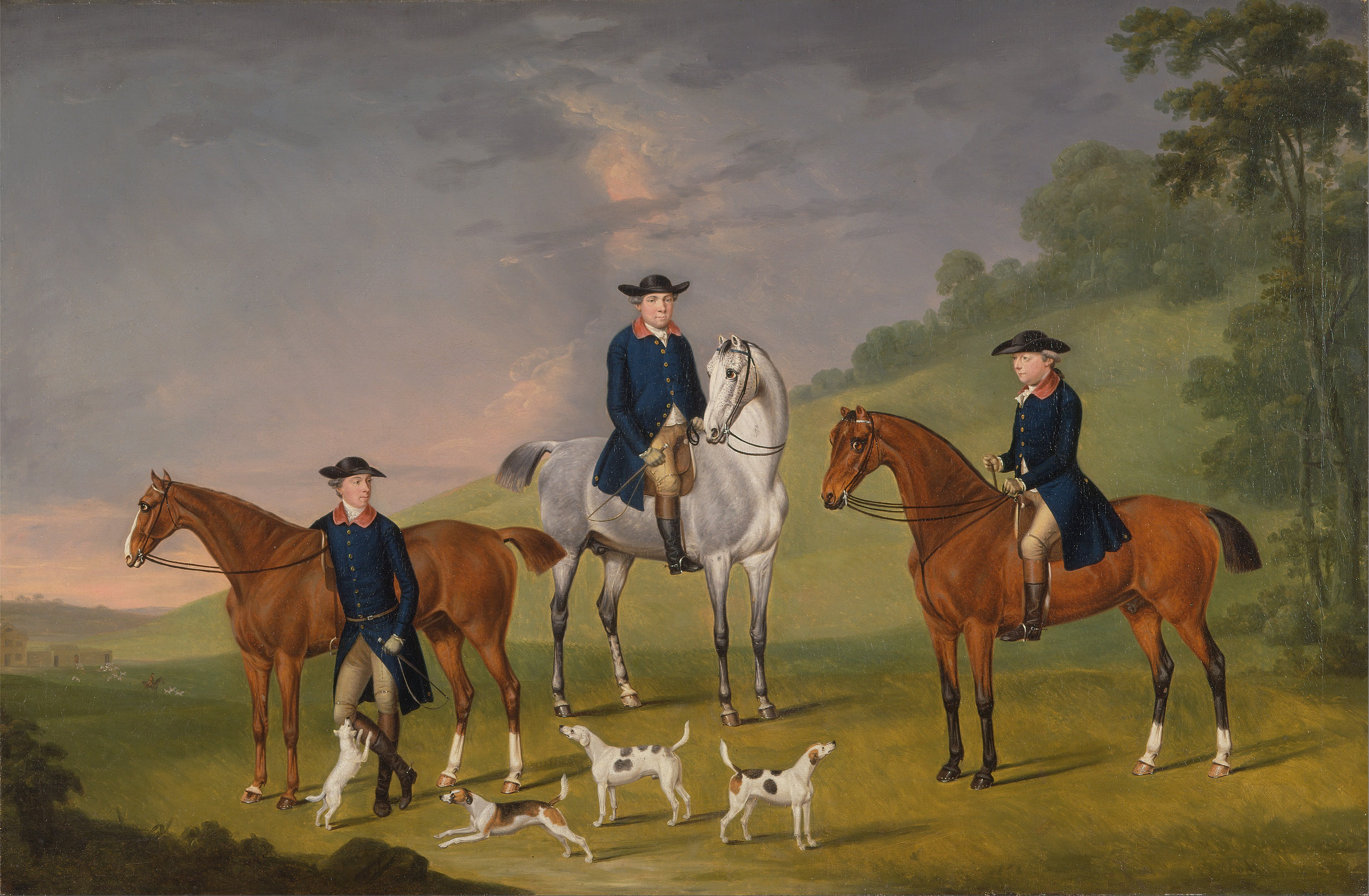
John Corbet, Sir Robert Leighton and John Kynaston with their horses and hounds, painting by Thomas Stringer, 1779.

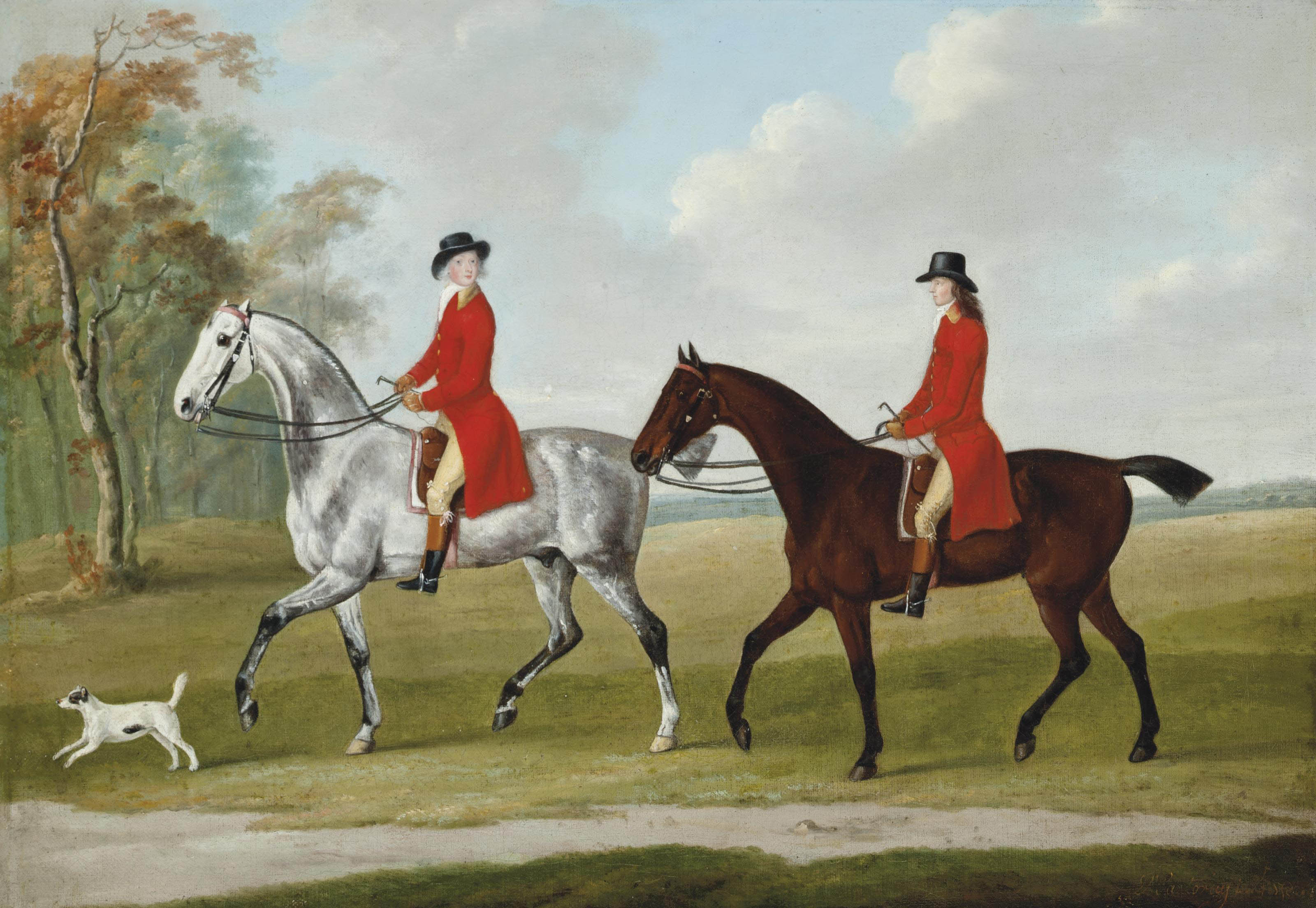
John and Andrew Corbet on two hunters, with a terrier, painting by John Nost Sartorius, 1781.

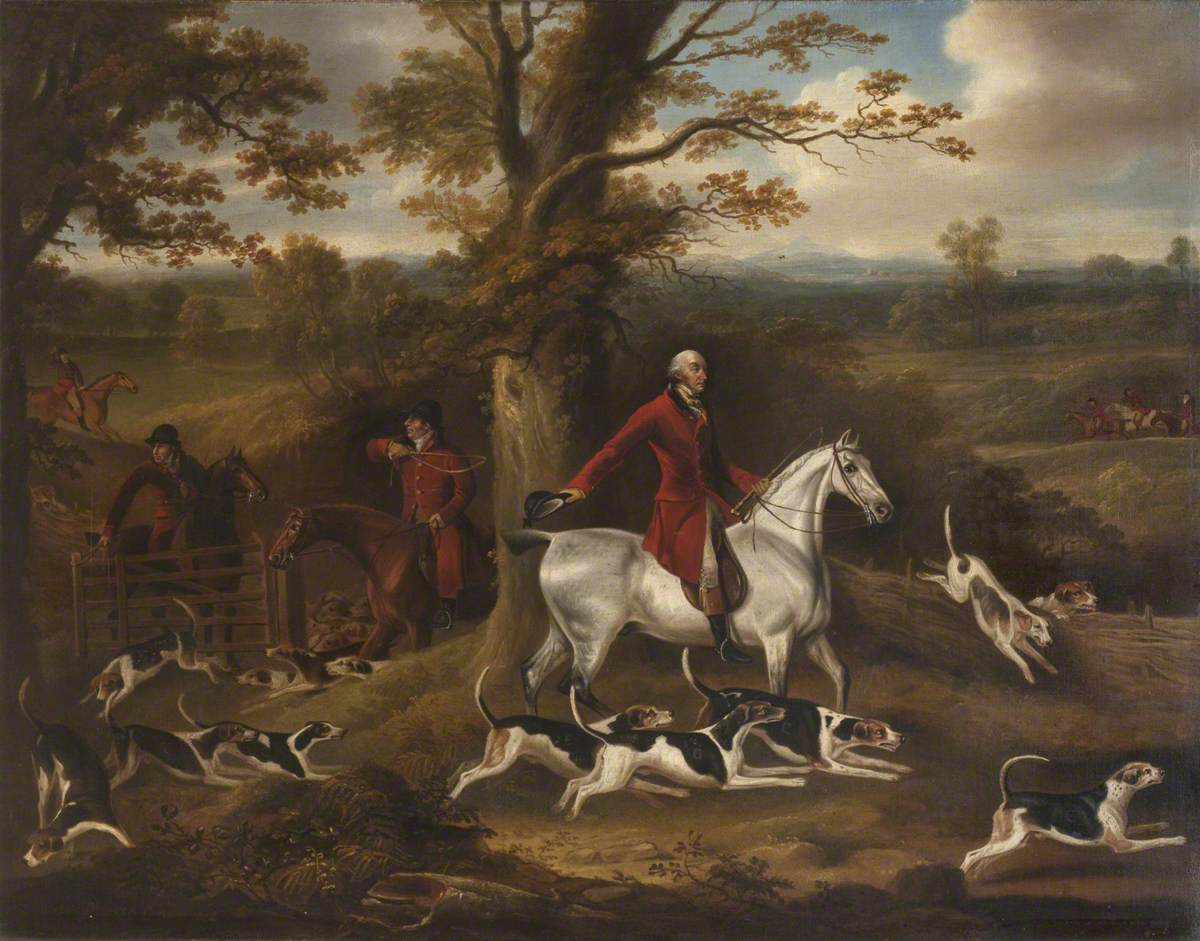
John Corbet and the Warwickshire Foxhounds, painting by Thomas Weaver, 1812.

== Family and estate ==
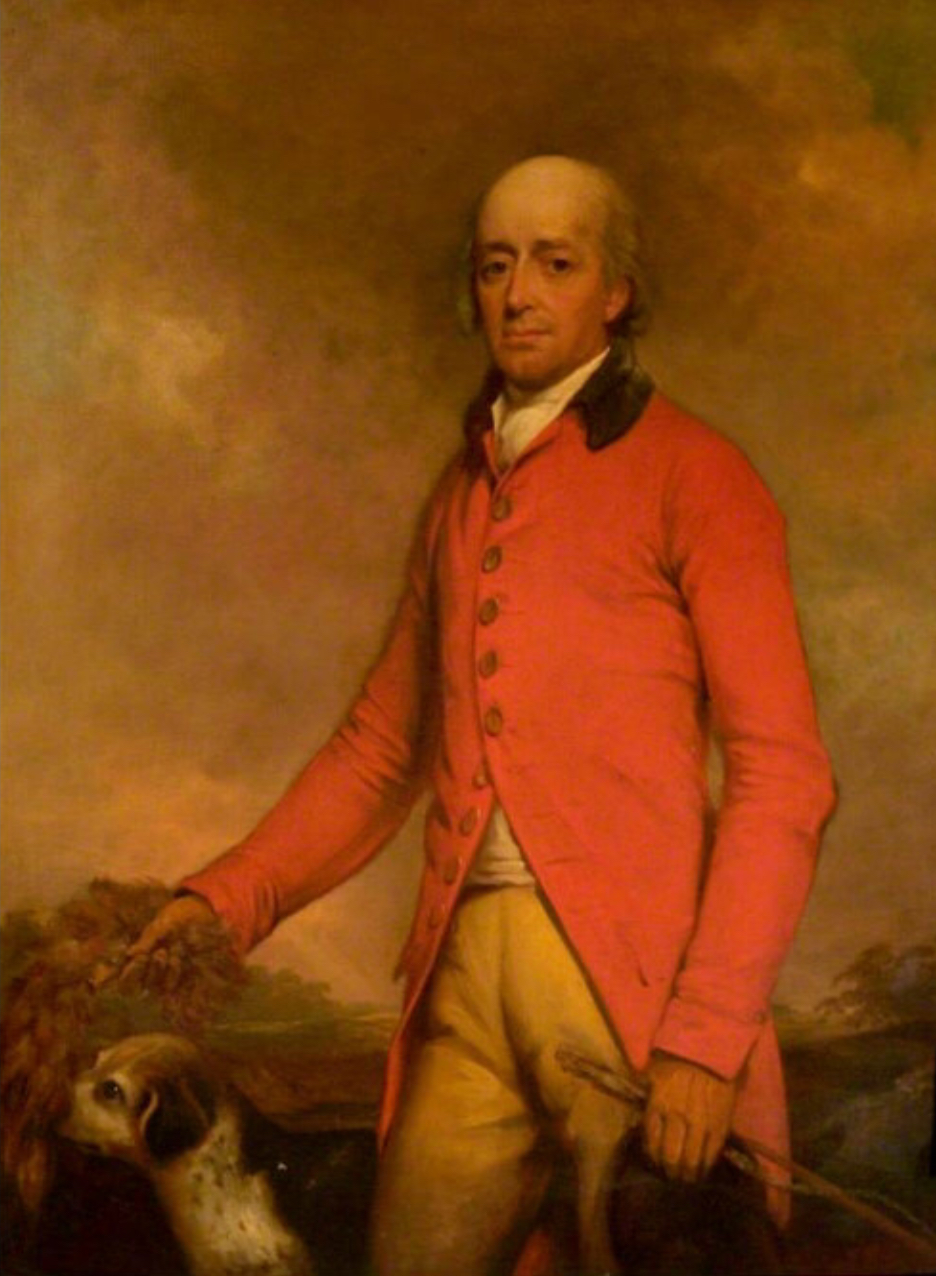
Corbet with his hound, Trojan, painting by anonymous artist (style of John Hoppner), late 18th century

John Corbet married twice and had ten children from the two marriages. His first wife was Emma Elizabeth Leighton, daughter of Sir Charlton Leighton, 3rd Baronet; they married in 1774 and she died in 1797. His second wife was Anne Pigott, daughter of the Reverend William Pigott, Rector of Edgmond and Chetwynd; they married in 1800. With his first wife Emma, Corbet had five children:

- Emma Elizabeth Corbet, born 1776, who married Sir Richard Puleston, 1st Baronet in 1798.
- Louisa Corbet, who died in infancy.
- Matilda Corbet, who died in infancy.
- John Kynaston Corbet, born 1790, who died aged 15 on 22 April 1806.
- Jane Elizabeth Corbet, born 1790.

With his second wife Anne, Corbet had another five children:

- Andrew William Corbet, born 1801, who succeeded his father to Sundorne Estate in 1817. Andrew married Mary Emma Hill in 1823 and died without children in 1856.
- Annabella Corbet, born 1803, who married Sir Theodore Brinckman, 1st Baronet in 1841. Arrabella succeeded her brother Dryden to Sundorne Estate in 1859 and died without children in 1864.
- Dryden Robert Corbet, born 1804, who succeeded his brother Andrew to Sundorne Estate in 1856. Dryden died unmarried in August 1859.
- Vincent Corbet, born 1806, who died unmarried in 1843.
- Kynaston Corbet, born 1808, who died unmarried in May 1859.

Upon the death of Annabella, Sundorne Estate passed to her cousin the Reverend John Dryden Pigott, the son of her mother Anne's brother, who subsequently adopted the surname Pigott-Corbet.

== Death ==
On 19 May 1817 John Corbet died at Mudeford surrounded by his family, having suffered a brain hemorrhage the previous day. His body was returned to Sundorne on 31 May, and on 2 June 1817 he was interred in the family vault in St Mary Magdalene's Church, Battlefield.

A gothic monument, designed by Hugh Owen, Archdeacon of Salop, was erected in the east end of the church bearing his arms together with the arms of his two wives. It bears the inscription:

Sacred

To the Memory of
JOHN CORBET, Esquire, of Sundorne
who departed this Life on the 19th day of May, 1817, aged 65 years.
He was in the twenty-first degree of lineal descent
from Corbet, a Nobleman of Normandy,
who accompanied William the First to the Conquest of England;
and received an ample donation of lands and manors in the
county of Salop, during the reign of that Monarch.

In the same vault are deposited the remains of his first Wife,
EMMA ELIZABETH,
daughter of Sir Charlton Leighton, Baronet,
of Loton,
who died the 19th day of September, 1797.

And their only Son,
JOHN KYNASTON CORBET,
Who died the 23rd day of April, 1806, aged 15 years.

This Monument is erected by his second Wife, ANNE, daughter of the
Reverend William Pigott, A.M. Rector of Edgemond and
Chetwynd, as a Tribute of the Gratitude and Affection
to the best of Husbands, the Rememberance
of whose Virtues is deeply engraven

upon her Heart.

An obituary to John Corbet in The Gentleman's Magazine in June 1817 stated of him:

Mr Corbet was a gentleman well known beyond the precincts of his own county, particularly in Warwickshire, where, at his sole expense, he kept a pack of fox hounds for nearly 30 years and where, by his liberal and gentlemanly conduct, he conciliated the respect and esteem of all ranks. In his own country Mr Corbet will not only be lamented by a numerous tenantry, to whom he was the best of landlords, but also by a large circle of friends and acquaintance, to whom his hospitable doors were always open. To the poor he was a liberal and unceasing benefactor; and, in every sense of the word, he may truly be said to have kept up the character of the independent country gentleman, firmly attached to our glorious Constitution in Church and State, and always anxiously wishing his powerful interest in the borough of Shrewsbury to tend to its support.

== See also ==
- Warwickshire Hunt

Parliament of Great Britain
Preceded by Robert Clive and William Pulteney	Member of Parliament for Shrewsbury; 1775–1780; With: William Pulteney	Succeeded by Sir Charlton Leighton and William Pulteney
