= John Johnstone (East India Company) =

Scottish nabob

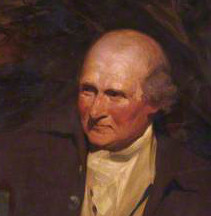
- from a larger painting
- Born: 28 April 1734; Edinburgh, Scotland
- Died: 10 December 1795 (aged 61); Alva, Clackmannanshire, Scotland
- Known for: Making a fortune in India (equivalent to £32.6 million in 2025).
- Spouse: Elizabeth

John Johnstone (28 April 1734 – 10 December 1795) was a Scottish nabob, a corrupt official of the British East India Company who returned home with great wealth. Described as "a shrewd and unscrupulous business man", he survived several scandals and became a major landowner when he returned to Scotland in 1765.

Johnstone sat in the House of Commons of Great Britain from 1774 to 1780, having bribed his way to a victory in the Dysart Burghs.

== Early life and family ==
Johnstone was born in Edinburgh, the fifth son of Sir James Johnstone, 3rd Baronet (1697–1772) and his wife, Barbara (died 1773), daughter of Alexander Murray, 4th Lord Elibank. The Jacobite plotter Alexander Murray of Elibank was his uncle.

His brothers included the British Army officer and politician Sir James Johnstone, 4th Baronet (1726–1794), the wealthy lawyer and politician William (later Sir William Pulteney, 5th Baronet (1729–1805), and the politician and Royal Navy officer George Johnstone (1730–1787). Another brother, Patrick, died in the Black Hole of Calcutta. His sister was Margaret, Lady Ogilvy, a Jacobite.

In 1765 Johnstone married Elizabeth Caroline Keene, daughter of a Colonel Keene from Northamptonshire, and niece of the diplomat Sir Benjamin Keene. They had one son and daughter. His daughter, Ann Elizabeth (b. 1776, d. 1851) married James Gordon of Craig. His son, James Raymond Johnstone of Alva, married Mary Elizabeth Cholmeley (b. c 1778, d. 9 Sep 1843).

The family became very powerful, and it was claimed that by the late 1750s they were "involved in every major event in the British Empire".

== Career ==
=== India ===
Johnstone went to Bengal in 1751, as a writer for the East India Company. He was at Dacca in 1756 when conflict broke out and was taken prisoner. After his release, emboldened by the death of his brother Patrick, he volunteered to join the company's military forces under Robert Clive for the Battle of Plassey, and saw further military service before resuming civilian work in 1757.

In about 1760 Johnstone was placed in charge of the company's affairs in Midnapore, and became a member of the Bengal Council. His success there led to a transfer in 1762 to Burdwan, where he developed private businesses which led to conflict with Henry Vansittart, the Governor of Bengal. This led to Johnstone being dismissed by the Company in early 1764, but the company's Court of Directors overturned the decision on 21 March 1764, and he was reinstated by May.

Johnstone's former ally Robert Clive did not support Johnstone's return to his post, and when Clive succeeded Vansittart as governor in 1765 he began an inquiry into gifts totalling over £50,000 which Johnstone had secured from the new Nawab of Bengal, Najimuddin Ali Khan.

In 1764, the Company had adopted new regulations which required its officers to sign a covenant that they would accept non-trivial gifts only with the prior approval of the directors. Clive forced the resignation of Johnstone, who sailed for Britain in October 1765 with a fortune estimated at £300,000 (equivalent to £32.6 million in 2025).

Aged 31, Johnstone proceeded to buy estates in Scotland, first at Alva in Stirlingshire, and later in Selkirkshire and Dumfriesshire.

=== Scotland ===
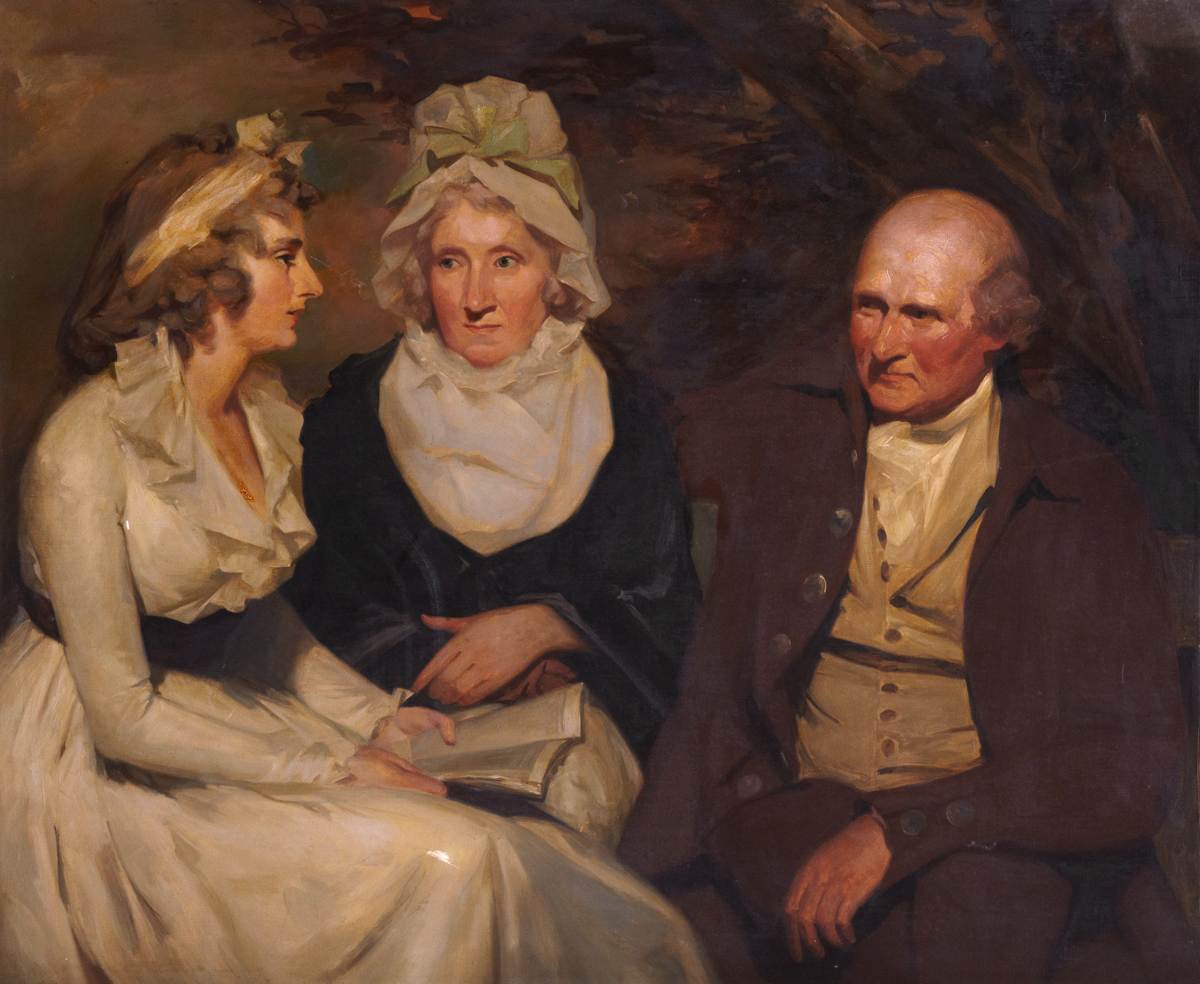
John Johnstone, his niece Betty Johnstone and her aunt Miss Wedderburn, attributed to Henry Raeburn

The Johnstone family account says that he spent "about a ninth" of his money on the estates at Alva, Hangingshaw and Denovan, and "lived quietly" there until his election to Parliament. However his letters to his brother William reveal that he continued to engage in speculation and stock manipulation.

Meanwhile, the directors of the East India Company moved to prosecute Johnstone for his actions. His allies, led by George Dempster, lobbied on his behalf and in his defence Johnstone published in 1766 "A letter to the proprietors of East-India stock", subtitled "Vindication of His Conduct in Receiving Presents from the Native Governments of India". In May 1767, the General Court of the East India Company over-ruled its directors, and dropped all prosecutions against its former servants, and Johnstone walked free.

The following year, at the 1768 general election, Johnstone contested the parliamentary borough of Haslemere in Surrey, where he was defeated.

At the next election, in 1774 Johnstone used guile and money to win the seat of Dysart Burghs, which consisted of five burghs in the county of Fife: Kirkcaldy, Burntisland, Kinghorn, and Dysart. The Caledonian Mercury reported on 2 November 1774 that Johnstone did not declare his interest until after the burghs had chosen their delegates, and caught the sitting MP James Oswald by surprise. Johnstone won the support of Dysart, and bribed the backing of Burntisland and Kinghorn delegates, winning the seat.

However, at the 1780 election Johnstone lost the support of Burntisland to his opponent John Henderson, who won the seat on the casting vote of Kirkcaldy.

=== Family links to slavery ===
When Johnstone returned to Scotland from India, he brought with him a number of Indian servants who may have been indentured. One of these was Bell, or Belinda, who was variously referred to as a girl, a woman, a servant, a slave and 'property'. Bell gave birth to a baby boy who was later found in the River Leven in Fife and she was accused of infanticide. The court at Perth accepted her petition to be banished "to one or other of His Majestys (sic) Plantations or settlements in the East or West Indies or in America". She was indentured as a "slave for life" to a Glasgow merchant and transported to Virginia in 1772. Bell was the last person to be deemed a slave by a British or Scottish court.

Slavery was found to be "not recognised by the laws of this kingdom" by the Perth court in 1774, when an enslaved man, Joseph Knight brought a claim to be free of his master John Wedderburn. Wedderburn was married to Johnstone's niece Margaret, daughter of his sister Margaret, Lady Ogilvy. Wedderburn appealed to the Court of Sessions in Edinburgh which eventually ruled that slavery was incompatible with Scots Law.

Johnstone later subscribed to the Society for the Abolition of the Slave Trade, founded in 1787.

== Death and legacy ==
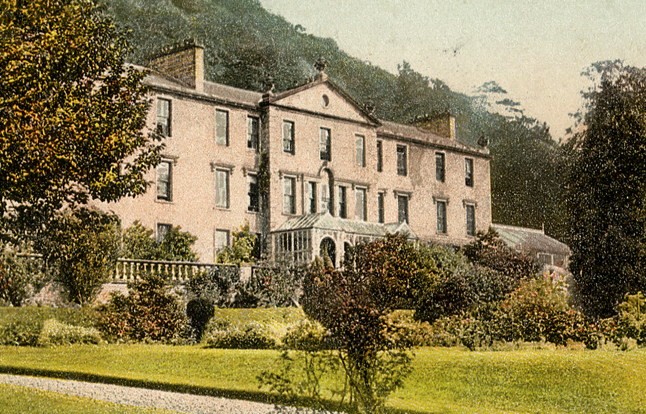
Alva House in the early 20th century

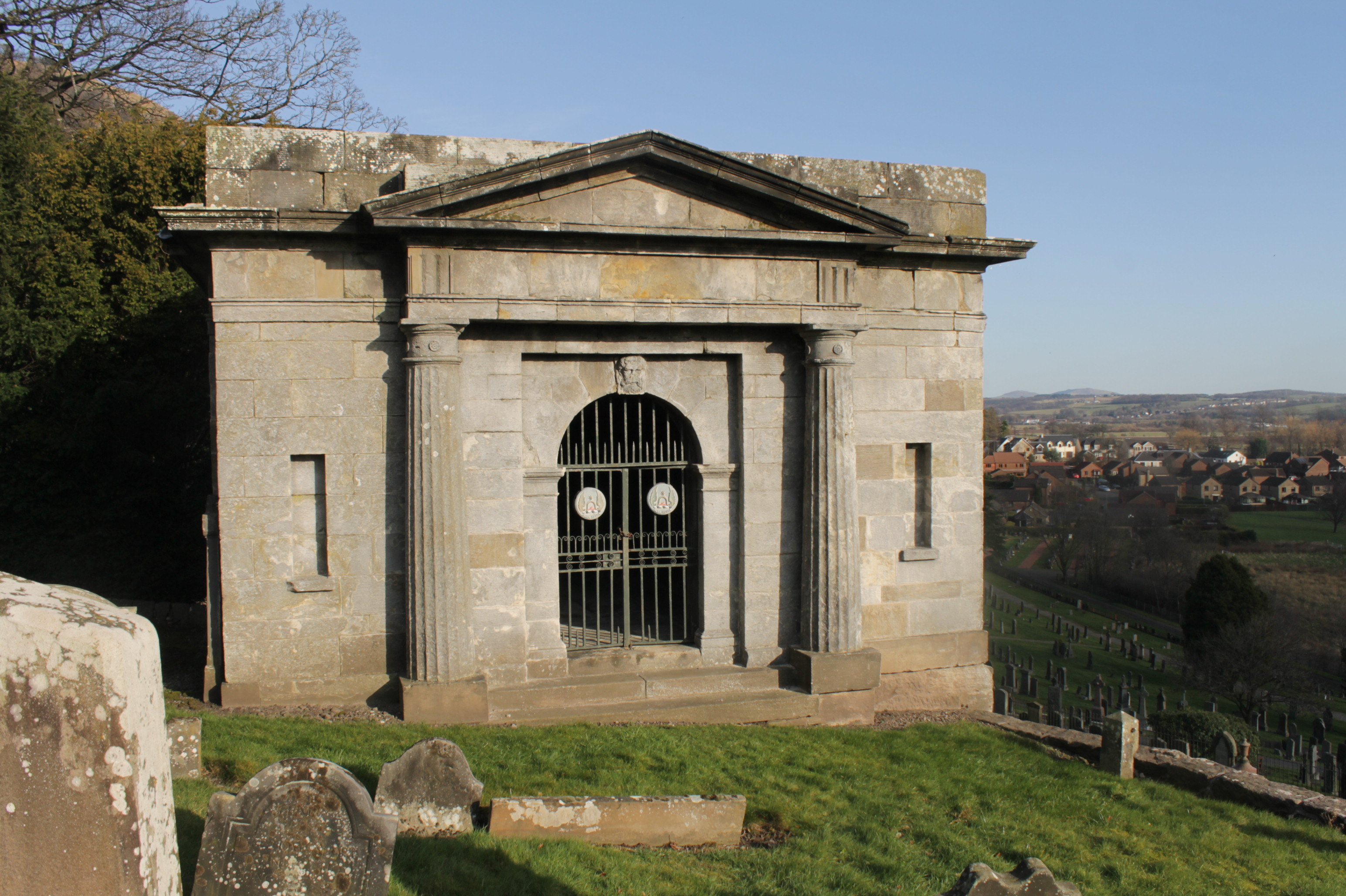
The Johnstone mausoleum, old Alva churchyard

Johnstone died on 10 December 1795, aged 61, at home in Alva House, which had been remodelled and expanded in 1789 to the designs of Robert Adam.

Adam's works also included a family mausoleum to house the remains of Johnstone and his wife Caroline in Alva churchyard.

His son James Raymond Johnstone (died 1830), had 8 children, of whom the eldest James Johnstone (1801–1888) was MP for Clackmannanshire and Kinross-shire.

Alva house remained in his family for over a century, and in 1890 it passed to his descendant Carolin Johnstone. She sold the surrounding estate to reduce her debts, but failed to clear them, and the house was abandoned by the 1920s. It was used for target practice during World War II, and left in ruins.

== Bibliography ==
- Johnstone, C. L. (1909). History of the Johnstones, 1191–1909, with descriptions of border life. Edinburgh: W. & A.K. Johnston, Ltd.

Parliament of Great Britain
Preceded by James Townsend Oswald	Member of Parliament for Dysart Burghs; 1774–1780	Succeeded by Sir John Henderson, Bt
