= Sir Frederick Johnstone, 8th Baronet =

Sir Frederick Johnstone
- Baronet of Westerhall
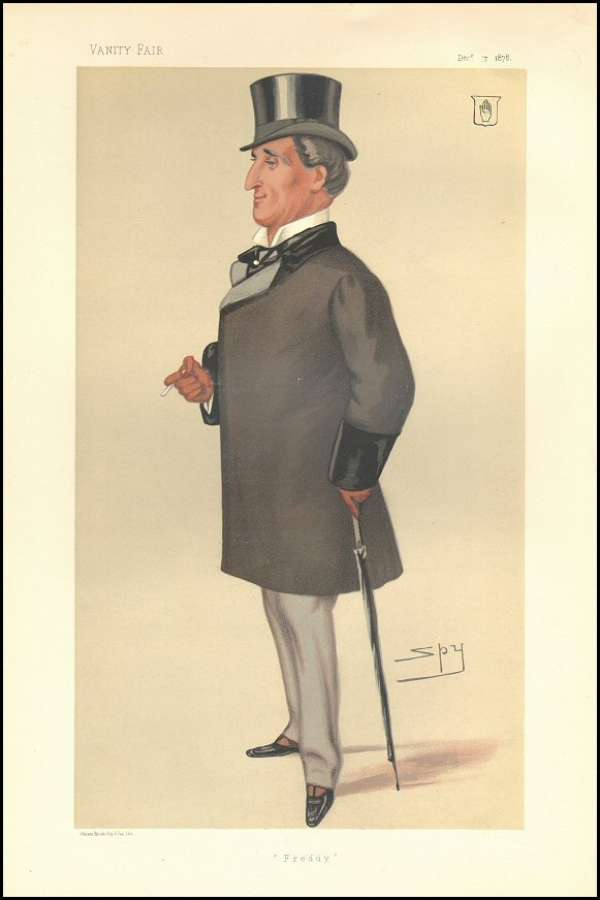
- "Freddy". Caricature by Spy published in Vanity Fair in 1878.

- Coat of arms
- Tenure: 1841–1913
- Predecessor: Sir Frederick Johnstone, 7th Baronet
- Successor: Sir George Johnstone, 9th Baronet
- Born: 5 August 1841
- Died: 20 June 1913 (aged 71)
- Father: Sir Frederick Johnstone, 7th Baronet
- Mother: Lady Louisa Craven

Sir Frederick John William Johnstone, 8th Baronet (5 August 1841 – 20 June 1913) was an English racehorse owner and Conservative Party politician who sat in the House of Commons from 1874 to 1885.

Johnstone was the son of Sir Frederick Johnstone, 7th Baronet and his wife Lady Louisa Craven, daughter of 1st Earl of Craven, and great-grandson of Sir William Pulteney, 5th Baronet. He succeeded to the baronetcy on birth, his father having died previously. He was educated at Eton College and Christ Church, Oxford. He joined the Dorset Yeomanry Cavalry in 1862.

Johnstone was a close friend of the Prince of Wales (later King Edward VII) and was named as a co-respondent in the divorce case involving Sir Charles Mordaunt and his wife, Harriet (1870) in which the Prince was called to give evidence.

At the 1874 general election Johnstone was elected member of parliament for Weymouth and Melcombe Regis. He held the seat until 1885. He was a racehorse owner and his horses twice won The Derby – St. Blaise in 1883 and Common in 1891. Owned a property at Westerhall, near Langholm in Dumfriesshire and it is possible that his ownership of St Blaise and Common are the reason that the annual Langholm Common Riding has, as its colours each year, the colours of that year's Derby winner. Johnstone died at the age of 71 in 1913.

Parliament of the United Kingdom
Preceded by Charles J. T. Hambro; Henry Edwards	Member of Parliament for Weymouth and Melcombe Regis; 1874 – 1885; With: Henry Edwards	Constituency abolished
Baronetage of Nova Scotia
Preceded by Frederick Johnstone	Baronet (of Westerhall); 1841–1913	Succeeded by George Johnstone
