= Johnstone baronets =

Baronetcy in the Baronetage of Nova Scotia

The Johnstone, later Pulteney, later Johnstone Baronetcy, of Westerhall in the County of Dumfries, is a title in the Baronetage of Nova Scotia. It was created on 25 April 1700 for John Johnstone, one of the Scottish representatives to the 1st Parliament of Great Britain, with remainder to his heirs male. He was eighth in descent from Matthew Johnstone, who is said to have been a younger son of Sir Adam Johnstone (d. 1454), ancestor of the Earls and Marquesses of Annandale. The second Baronet sat as a Member of Parliament for Dumfries and Dumfriesshire. The third Baronet represented Dumfries, while the fourth Baronet sat as Member of Parliament for Dumfries and Weymouth. The fifth Baronet, Sir William, was Member of Parliament for Cromarty and Shrewsbury. He married Frances, daughter of Daniel Pulteney and niece and heiress of William Pulteney, 1st Earl of Bath, through which marriage vast estates came into the family. On his marriage Sir William assumed the surname of Pulteney in lieu of Johnstone. His only child, Laura, inherited the Pulteney estates and was created Countess of Bath in 1803 (see this title for more information). The sixth, seventh and eighth Baronets all represented Weymouth in Parliament. The sixth Baronet twice declined a peerage offered to him by Spencer Perceval.

Several other members of the family may also be mentioned. George Johnstone, fourth son of the third Baronet, was an officer of the Royal Navy, a Member of Parliament, and the first Governor of West Florida. John Johnstone, fifth son of the third Baronet, was a Member of Parliament. Henry James Johnstone (1895–1947) (son of Major James Henry L'Estrange Johnstone, son of James Johnstone, eldest son of James Raymond Johnstone, only son of the aforementioned John Johnstone, fifth son of the third Baronet), was a captain in the Royal Navy. Montague Cholmeley Johnstone, third son of the aforementioned James Raymond Johnstone, was a General in the British Army. John Heywood Johnstone, son of Reverend George Dempster Johnstone, fourth son of the aforementioned James Raymond Johnstone, was a barrister and Member of Parliament for Horsham. Richard Vanden-Bempde-Johnstone, eldest son of Colonel John Johnstone, second son of the second Baronet, was created a baronet in 1795, with remainder to his younger brother, who was the grandfather of Harcourt Vanden-Bempde-Johnstone, 1st Baron Derwent (see the Baron Derwent for more information on this branch of the family).

Escutcheon of the Johnstone baronets of Westerhall

== Johnstone, later Pulteney, later Johnstone baronets, of Westerhall (1700) ==
- Sir John Johnstone, 1st Baronet (died 1711)
- Sir William Johnstone, 2nd Baronet (died 1727)
- Sir James Johnstone, 3rd Baronet (died 1772)
- Sir James Johnstone, 4th Baronet (1726–1794)
- Sir William Pulteney, 5th Baronet (1729–1805), lawyer and MP
- Sir John Lowther Johnstone, 6th Baronet (c. 1783–1811)
- Sir Frederick George Johnstone, 7th Baronet (1810–1841)
- Sir Frederick John William Johnstone, 8th Baronet (1841–1913)
- Sir George Fredric Thomas Tankerville Johnstone, 9th Baronet (1876–1952)
- Sir Frederic Allan George Johnstone, 10th Baronet (1906–1994)
- Sir George Richard Douglas Johnstone, 11th Baronet (born 1948)

The heir apparent is the present holder's son Frederic Robert Arthur Johnstone (born 1981).

== See also ==
- Marquess of Annandale
- Baron Derwent
- Earl of Bath
- Johnson baronets
- Johnston baronets
