= Sir Frederick Johnstone, 7th Baronet =

Sir Frederick Johnstone, 7th Baronet (1810–1841) was a Member of Parliament (MP) for Weymouth and Melcombe Regis from 1832 to 1835. He was part of the Johnstone baronets family.

== Life ==
The only son of Sir John Johnstone, 6th Baronet, he married in 1840 Lady Louisa Elizabeth Frederica Craven, only daughter of William Craven, 1st Earl of Craven. He died, after a fall from his horse, on 7 May 1841.

Johnstone inherited from his father the Westerhall estate on Grenada, and was paid compensation for it under the Slave Compensation Act 1837.

Parliament of the United Kingdom
Preceded by John Gordon; Fowell Buxton; Charles Baring Wall; Masterson Ure	Member of Parliament for Weymouth and Melcombe Regis reduced to 2 seats from 1832; 1832–1835; With: Fowell Buxton	Succeeded by William Burdon; Fowell Buxton
Baronetage of Nova Scotia
Preceded by John Johnstone	Baronet (of Westerhall); 1811–1841	Succeeded by Frederick Johnstone
