= Bell (slave) =

Bell, also called Belinda, (c. 1750 – after 1772) was a servant or enslaved woman born in Bengal, India. She was in the service of an East India Company nabob who returned with her to London, then moved to Fife, Scotland. She was charged with infanticide at Perth and was transported to Virginia as a "slave for life" in 1772. She was the last person deemed a slave in a British court.

== Early life ==
Bell, or Belinda, was born to a lower-caste family in Bengal, India around 1750. She entered the service of John Johnstone of Hangingshaw, who was a wealthy merchant and tax collector in the British East India Company, and his wife Elizabeth. In 1767, Johnstone returned with Bell and several other Indian servants to London where they lived for four years, before the family moved to Balgonie House in Fife. Bell's age and status at this time were not clear. In later court records she was variously referred to as a girl, a woman, a servant, a slave and 'property'.

== Infanticide and enslavement ==
In May 1771, Bell gave birth to a child whose body was later found in the River Leven. The baby boy's body "had the marks of violence upon him" and was not white. It is possible that the child had died during or after birth and Bell was disposing of his body in line with Hindu burial rites. The fact that she had concealed her pregnancy and given birth alone were considered evidence of her guilt.

Bell was charged with infanticide at Perth but the case did not come to trial as the court accepted her petition to be banished: "May it Please your Lordships to Banish me to one or other of His Majestys (sic) Plantations or settlements in the East or West Indies or in America." Bell avoided hanging, which was the sentence handed down to a woman who had been convicted of the same crime in Perth 10 years earlier. She was indentured as "a slave for life" to a Glasgow merchant, who transported her to Virginia in 1772.

She was the last person to be deemed a slave in a British court. Two years after Bell was transported to Virginia, the case of Joseph Knight was also heard in Perth and it found that "the state of slavery is not recognised by the laws of this kingdom". In 1778, the Court of Session in Edinburgh ruled that slavery was incompatible with Scots Law. The case had been brought against Knight by his former master, John Wedderburn, whose wife Margaret was a niece of John Johnstone. John Johnstone became an MP and was later involved in the Society for the Abolition of the Slave Trade, founded in 1787.

== Later life ==
There are no records of Bell after 1772, in Williamsburg, Virginia.
