= Sir Charlton Leighton, 4th Baronet =

British politician

Sir Charlton Leighton, 4th Baronet (c.1747–9 September 1784) was a British politician who sat in the House of Commons between 1774 and 1784.

Leighton was the son of Sir Charlton Leighton, 3rd Baronet and his first wife Anna Maria Mytton, daughter of Richard Mytton of Halston, near Shrewsbury. He was educated at Shrewsbury School and was admitted at St John's College, Cambridge on 17 September 1763 aged 16.

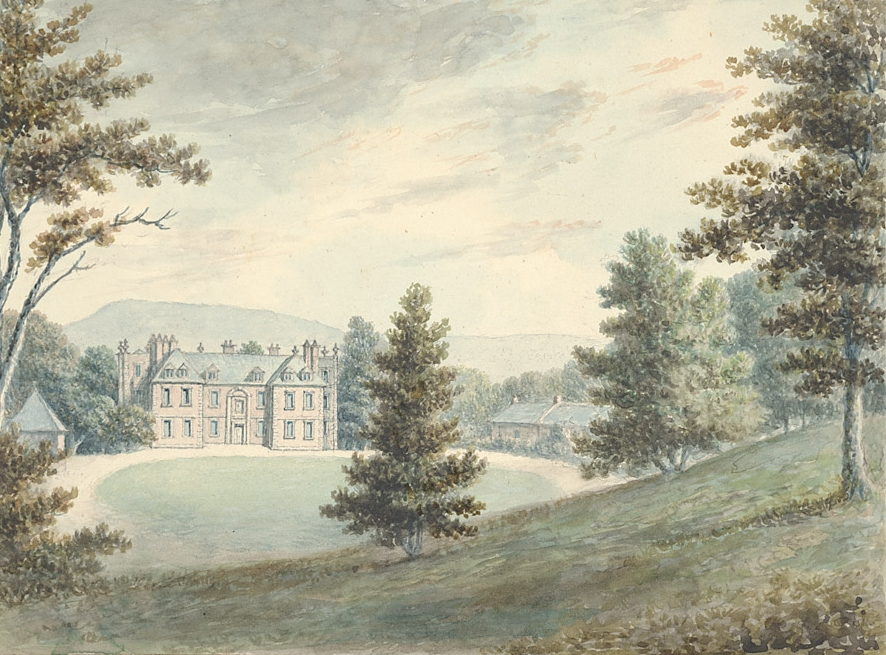
Loton Hall, 1796

In the 1774 general election Leighton contested Shrewsbury with Robert Clive and was elected as Member of Parliament, but he was unseated on petition in 1775. He succeeded his father in the baronetcy and to Loton Park on 5 May 1780.

At the 1780 general election he was returned unopposed at Shrewsbury and was again returned unopposed there in 1784.

Leighton died unmarried on 9 September 1784 and was succeeded in the baronetcy by his half-brother Robert.

== Sources ==
- Loton Park

Parliament of Great Britain
Preceded by Noel Hill; Robert Clive	Member of Parliament for Shrewsbury; 1774– 1775; With: Robert Clive	Succeeded by William Pulteney; Robert Clive
Preceded by William Pulteney; John Corbet	Member of Parliament for Shrewsbury; 1780–1784; With: William Pulteney	Succeeded by William Pulteney; John Hill
Baronetage of England
Preceded by Charles Leighton	Baronet (of Wattlesborough); 1780-1784	Succeeded by Robert Leighton
