= John Hutton (physician) =

John Hutton FRS (died 1712) was a Scottish physician and Member of Parliament.

He was a native of Caerlaverock, Dumfriesshire, and in early life was a herd-boy to the local episcopalian minister, who ensured that he received a good education, studying medicine at Edinburgh and graduating M.D. at Padua.

By chance he was the nearest doctor on hand when Princess Mary of Orange fell from her horse in 1686 and so impressed Prince William that the latter, after making diligent enquiries about Hutton's experience and character, appointed him his wife's physician. When William became king of England in 1689 he appointed Hutton the court physician on £400 p.a., enabling his election as a fellow of the College of Physicians in 1690. He accompanied the king to Ireland, and was with him at the Battle of the Boyne and at the Siege of Limerick. In addition to acting as William's personal physician he also acted as physician-general to his army.

In 1695 he was awarded M.D. at Oxford and was elected a Fellow of the Royal Society on 30 November 1697. When Queen Anne gained the throne in 1702 he continued as her first physician, but only for 6 months. He did, however, retain his post as physician-general of the Army until 1707.

In 1710 he was encouraged by his countrymen to sit in Parliament as the representative for Dumfries, which he did until his death in 1712.

He never married. After bequests to Caerlaverock and his family, the remainder of his estate went to his cousin, the keeper of Somerset House in London, who had provided him with lodgings in the house and complied with his request to be buried in the chapel there.

Parliament of Great Britain
Preceded by William Johnstone	Member of Parliament for Dumfries Burghs; 1710–1712	Succeeded by Sir William Johnstone, Bt
