= Sir William Pulteney, 5th Baronet =

British lawyer, politician and landowner (1729–1805)

Sir William Pulteney Bt
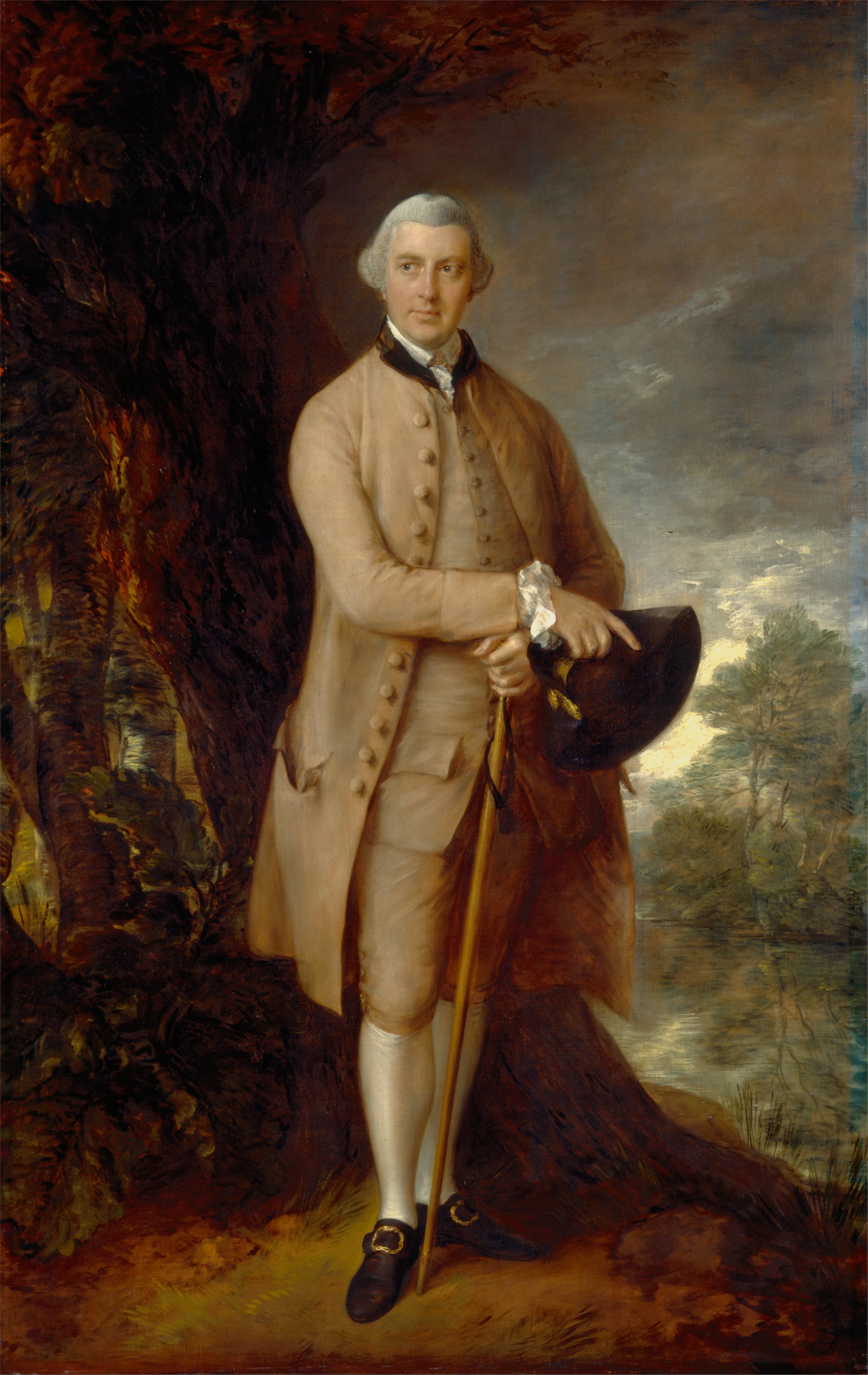
- Portrait of Sir William Pulteney by Thomas Gainsborough, 1772

Member of Parliament for Cromarty
- In office 1768–1774
- Preceded by: Vacant
- Succeeded by: Vacant

Member of Parliament for Shrewsbury
- In office 1775–1805
- Preceded by: Sir Charlton Leighton
- Succeeded by: John Hill

Personal details
- Born: William Johnstone; October 1729 Dumfriesshire, Scotland
- Died: 30 May 1805 (aged 75) Bath House, Piccadilly
- Resting place: Westminster Abbey
- Party: Whig
- Children: Laura
- Parent(s): Sir James Johnstone; Barbara Murray
- Net worth: ▲£12.133 billion in 2011 pounds

Sir William Pulteney, 5th Baronet (born William Johnstone; October 1729 – 30 May 1805) was a British lawyer, Whig politician and landowner who sat in the House of Commons between 1768 and 1805. One of the wealthiest Britons during his lifetime, he invested in the construction of several prominent buildings in Britain, including the Pulteney Bridge and other properties in Bath, Somerset, several beachfront residences in Weymouth, Dorset, and roads in Scotland. Pulteney was also a patron of architect Robert Adam and civil engineer Thomas Telford. He also owned slave plantations in British America.

== Early life ==
William Johnstone, as he was born, was the second son of Sir James Johnstone, 3rd Baronet of Wester Hall, Dumfries, and his wife Barbara Murray, the oldest sister of the literary patron Patrick Murray, 5th Lord Elibank.

His older brother was the soldier and politician Sir James Johnstone, 4th Baronet. His older sister was Margaret, later Lady Ogilvy, a Jacobite. His younger brothers included the politician and naval officer George Johnstone and the East India Company official John Johnstone. Alexander Murray of Elibank, also a Jacobite, was his uncle.

He studied law, became a member of the Faculty of Advocates in 1751, and went on to become an eminent advocate. He lived in Edinburgh and associated with several major figures of the country's learned society, including philosopher and historian David Hume, political philosopher and economist Adam Smith, and architect Robert Adam. He was a brother of Commodore George Johnstone and first cousin of Patrick Ferguson.

== Marriage and name change ==
On 10 November 1760, he married heiress Frances Pulteney. Frances was the third daughter of MP and government official Daniel Pulteney and first cousin once removed of William Pulteney, 1st Earl of Bath. She inherited William's substantial fortune and estates close to Bath in Somerset after his death in 1764 and that of his younger brother and heir in 1767. On inheriting, Johnstone changed his name in 1767 to Pulteney. Simultaneously, his daughter's name was also changed from Henrietta Laura Johnstone to Henrietta Laura Pulteney.

On 1 June 1782, his wife Frances died, leaving him her fortune.

== Pulteney Bridge ==
At that time Bath was expanding, but the Pulteneys' rural Bathwick estate was separated from the city by the River Avon, and with no bridge in place the only means of crossing the river was via a small ferry. They decided a bridge needed to be built, and Pulteney turned to his friend and fellow countryman, architect Robert Adam. Adam was influenced by his travels to Florence and Venice and proposed a bridge incorporating shops along both sides. The Pulteney Bridge was completed in 1773, but the Pulteneys' original plans for Bath's expansion did not take effect until 1788 when Bath architect Thomas Baldwin started to create a new estate. As well as the bridge bearing their name, the Pulteneys' involvement is recalled by Great Pulteney Street in Bathwick, reputed to be the longest boulevard of its kind in Europe, while Henrietta Street was named after their daughter.

== Parliamentarian ==
Pulteney represented Cromarty and later Shrewsbury, where he usually resided, in seven successive Parliaments. He first but unsuccessfully contested the Shrewsbury seat in 1768, but subsequently won the seat for Cromarty (losing this to Cosmo Gordon in 1774). In 1774, he again contested Shrewsbury, and although he was defeated, he was returned on petition the following March (and retained the seat until his death in May 1805).

== North American real estate investment ==
In July 1770 Alexander Fordyce collaborated with two planters John and William Macintosh on Grenada and borrowed 240,000 guilders in bearer bonds from Hope & Co. Also William Pulteney, Samuel Hoare (1716–1796) and John Harman were involved. Pulteney invested in plantations in the West Indies and in land what is today western New York state. The settlements of Bath, Pulteney, Henrietta and Caledonia, New York, are evidence of his speculation at the end of the 18th century, through 'The Pulteney Association' an agency run by his agent Charles Williamson.

== Patron of Thomas Telford ==
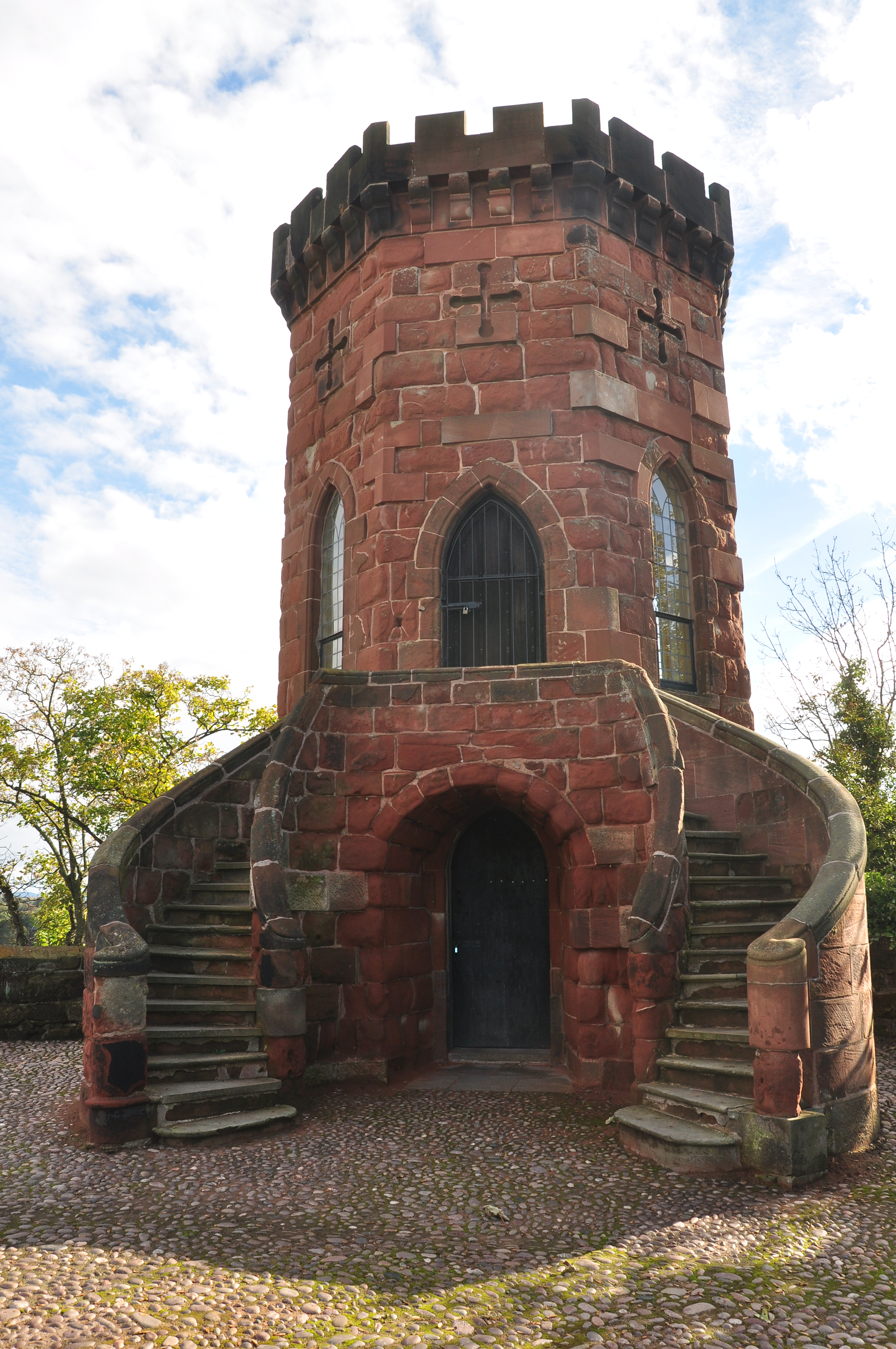
Laura's Tower, a folly tower added to Shrewsbury Castle by Telford, named for Pulteney's daughter, Laura

In 1783, Pulteney began working with Thomas Telford, later the most eminent civil engineer of his day. When Pulteney first met him, Telford was a young stonemason from the same parish of Westerkirk in Dumfries, who had travelled to London to seek work. In 1787, Pulteney commissioned Telford to supervise restoration works at Shrewsbury Castle following Robert Adam's designs, and helped his appointment as Surveyor of Public Works for Shropshire.

Later, as Governor of the British Fisheries Society, Pulteney appointed Telford to design the world's then-largest herring fishing port, at Wick in Caithness. The village was named Pulteneytown and is the location of the Old Pulteney whisky distillery.

Pulteney was also influential in Telford's 1801 appointment to devise a master plan to improve communications in the Scottish Highlands, a massive project that was to last 20 years.

Pulteney also took a lively interest in many other engineering projects, including that of Bell Rock lighthouse, supporting a bill in 1803.

== Legacy ==
He succeeded to the Johnstone baronetcy in 1794 on the death of his elder brother James Johnstone. He was thus titled 5th Baronet Pulteney, having declined several offers of a peerage during his parliamentary career.

In 1804 Pulteney married his second wife, Margaret, widow of Andrew Stuart and daughter of Sir William Stirling. The marriage did not last long: Pulteney died intestate at Bath House in Piccadilly, London, on 30 May 1805, and was buried at Westminster Abbey.

His daughter, (Henrietta) Laura, was created 1st Baroness of Bath on 26 July 1792 and 1st Countess of Bath on 26 October 1803. In 1794, she had married her father's first cousin Sir James Murray, who had taken the name Murray-Pulteney. She died on 14 July 1808 without bearing children and her titles became extinct.

In the towns of Hammondsport and Bath, New York, there are village squares and streets named after Pulteney.

== Sources ==
- Hakes, Harlo (1896). Landmarks of Steuben County, New York. Syracuse, N.Y.: D. Mason & Co.

Parliament of Great Britain
Vacant alternating constituency, with Nairnshire Title last held by Sir John Gordon (until 1761)	Member of Parliament for Cromarty; 1768–1774	Vacant alternating constituency, with Nairnshire Title next held by George Ross (from 1780)
Preceded by Robert Clive; Noel Hill	Member of Parliament for Shrewsbury; 1775–1801; With: Robert Clive 1775; John Corbet 1775–80; Sir Charlton Leighton 1780–84; John Hill 1784–96; William Noel-Hill 1796–1801	Succeeded by Parliament of the United Kingdom
Parliament of the United Kingdom
Preceded by Parliament of Great Britain	Member of Parliament for Shrewsbury; 1801–1805; With: William Noel-Hill	Succeeded by William Noel-Hill; John Hill
Baronetage of Nova Scotia
Preceded by James Johnstone	Baronet (of Westerhall); 1794–1805	Succeeded by John Lowther Johnstone
