= Sir John Johnstone, 1st Baronet =

Scottish Army officer and politician

Sir John Johnstone, 1st Baronet (died 30 September 1711) was a Scottish Army officer and politician.

He was the oldest son of Sir James Johnstone of Westerhall, Dumfriesshire, a member of the pre-Union Parliament of Scotland. His mother Margaret was the daughter of John Bannatyne of Corehouse in Lanarkshire. He was the older brother of William Johnstone MP.

In 1700 Johnstone became a Shire Commissioner for Dumfriesshire in succession to his father and was made a baronet. He supported the Court party in the hope of advancing his army career, and as circumstances changed he moved between patrons, including the rivals Annandale and Queensberry.

Backing the Duke of Argyll after 1704, Johnstone consistently voted for the Union with England. In 1707, he became one of the 45 Scottish representatives to the first Parliament of Great Britain.

However, he did not make any impact at Westminster, and did not stand for Dumfriesshire in the 1708 election. (His brother William took the seat).

By 1711, Johnstone had been promoted to the rank of lieutenant colonel. He died in September that year after being seriously wounded at the Siege of Tournai, and since his two marriages had produced a daughter, Philadelphia, but no sons, his baronetcy and estates passed to his brother William.

Baronetage of Nova Scotia
New creation	Baronet (of Westerhall); 1700–1711	Succeeded by William Johnstone
