= Margaret Ogilvy, Lady Ogilvy =

Scottish Jacobite

Lady Ogilvy
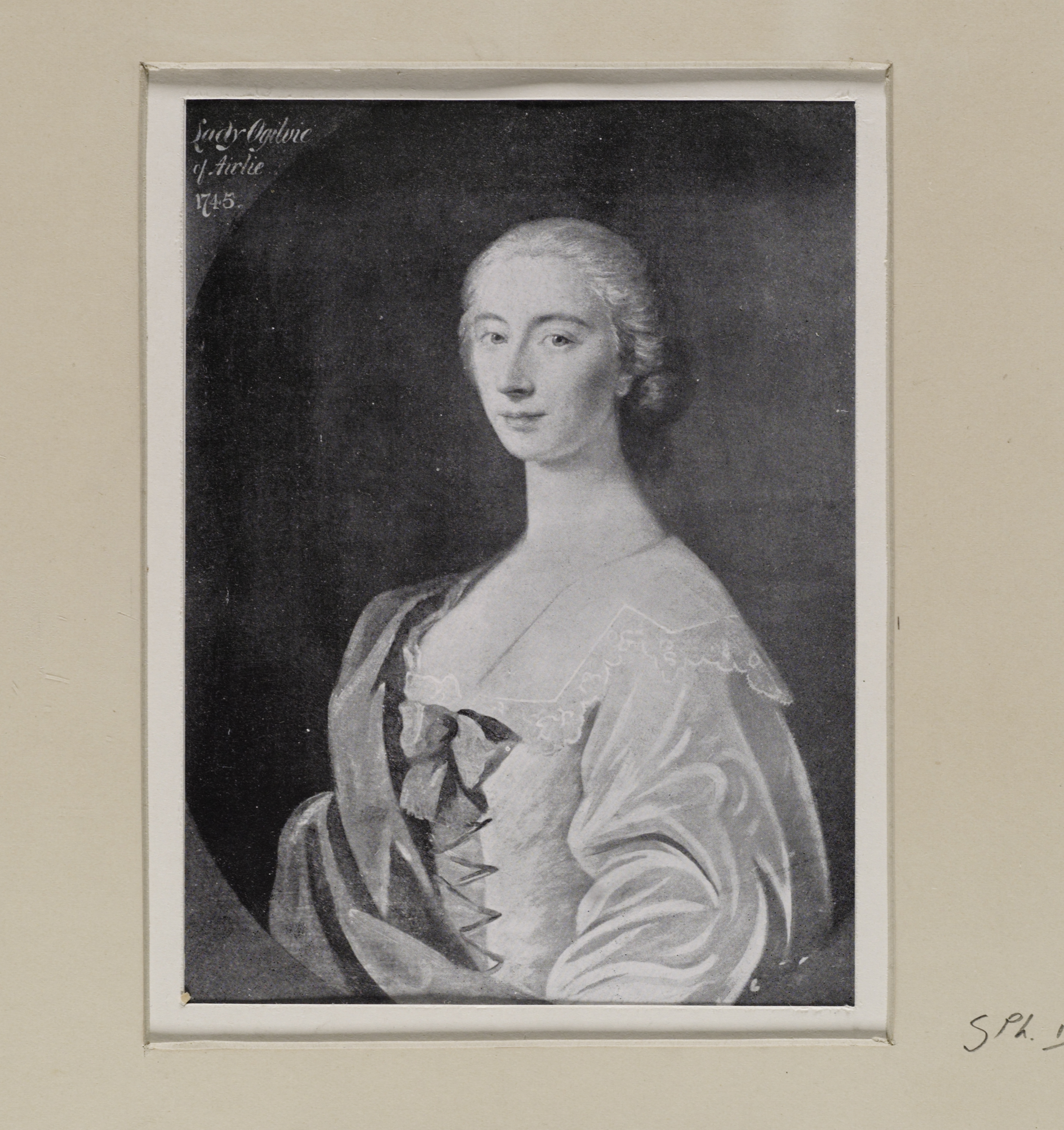
- Lady Ogilvy in 1745
- Born: Margaret Johnstone, 1725
- Died: 1757
- Wars and battles: Jacobite rising of 1745
- Spouse: David Ogilvy, 6th Earl of Airlie
- Issue: Margaret; David; Johanna
- Parents: Sir James Johnstone, 3rd Baronet; Barbara Murray

Margaret Ogilvy, Lady Ogilvy (née Johnstone; 1725 – 1757) was a Scottish Jacobite noblewoman. She accompanied the Jacobite army to several battles in 1746. She was captured and imprisoned after the Battle of Culloden, but escaped from Edinburgh Castle into a brief exile in France before returning to Scotland with her family.

== Early life and family ==
She was born Margaret Johnstone, daughter of Sir James Johnstone, 3rd Baronet of Westerhall, and his wife, The Hon. Barbara Murray, whose brothers were involved in the Jacobite movement. Her many siblings included Barbara, James (later a lieutenant-colonel in the English army), William, George, and John.

By 1745 she had eloped with David Ogilvy, Lord Ogilvy, later the de jure 6th Earl of Airlie and Chief of Clan Ogilvy who led his clan during the '45.

== Jacobite rising of 1745 ==
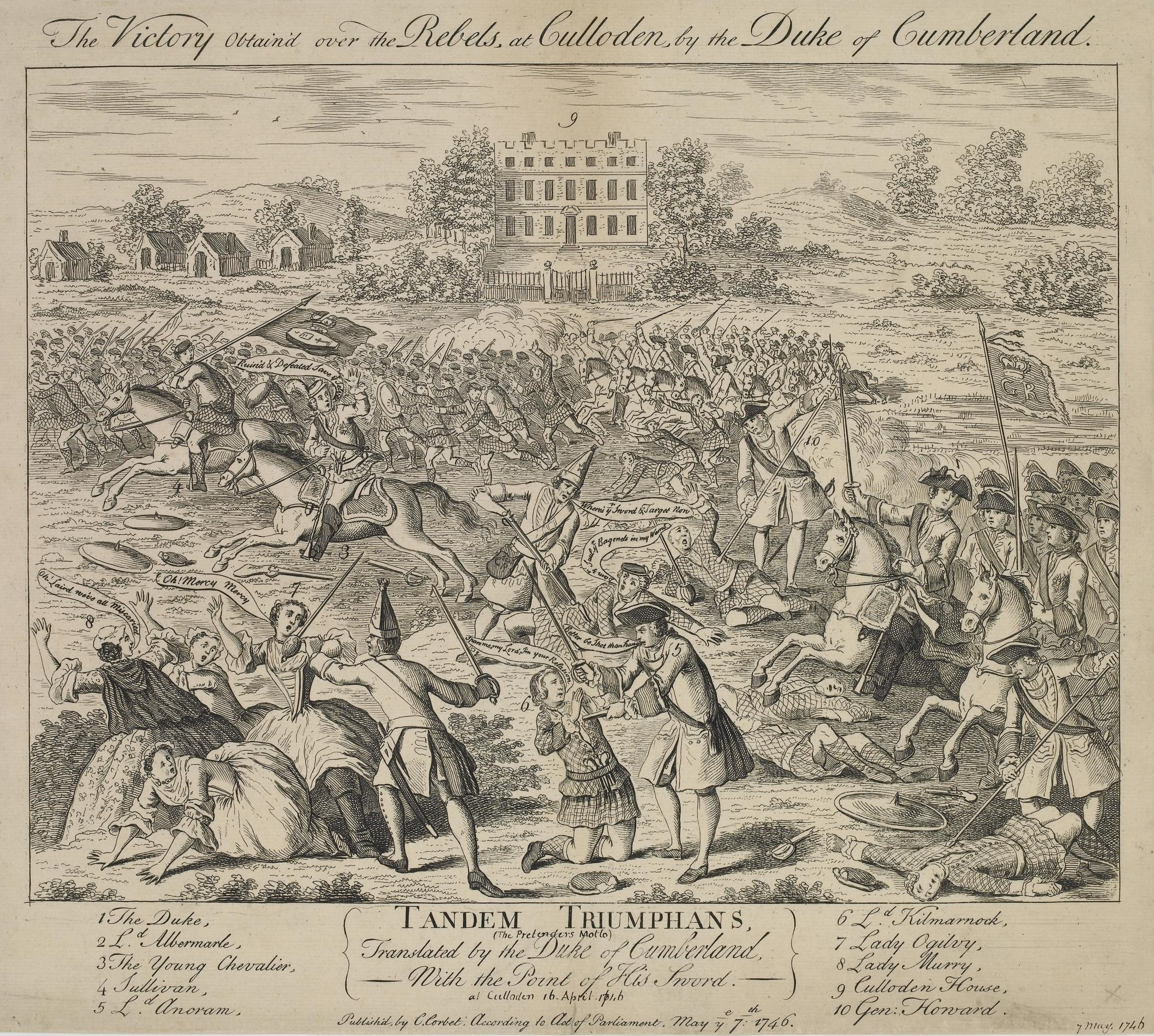
A satirical print featuring Margaret Ogilvy (bottom left), holding a sword and wearing a military jackboot, at the Battle of Culloden in 1746.

In 1745, Margaret accompanied her husband at the front of his regiment during the Jacobite uprising. She was accused of inciting violence in Coupar Angus in October 1745, tearing down a poster of King George, while her husband stood with a drawn sword to intimidate a bailie into announcing that James VI and I was the true king. She also accompanied the reserve force at the Battle of Falkirk Muir.

After the Battle of Culloden in April 1746, Margaret was captured at Inverness and imprisoned in Edinburgh Castle. She escaped in November 1746. Nineteenth-century accounts claim that she did this by trading clothes with her washerwoman and with the help of her sister Barbara Johnston. Her husband had fled, via Norway and Sweden, to France, and Margaret joined him there.

In 1747 she was among the Jacobite women to be criticised in the anti-Jacobite pamphlet The Female Rebel, which claimed, among other things, that she was only attracted to the Jacobite cause because she was charmed by the manners of the rebel Edward Stuart.

== Later life ==
Margaret and David's first child, Margaret, was born in Boulogne, France, in 1748, at which point David was a lieutenant-general in the army of Louis XV. This daughter married John Wedderburn who was involved in the landmark Joseph Knight case that found slavery to be incompatible with Scots Law.

David was pardoned by George III in 1778. The birth of their son David in Auchterhouse, Angus, in 1751 suggests that the Ogilvys were able to return to Scotland before David's pardon. Their son David was not considered to be of sound enough mind to inherit the title, which passed to a cousin. Their third child, Johanna, was born in 1755/6.

Lady Ogilvy died in 1757.
