= Sir William Johnstone, 2nd Baronet =

Scottish landowner and politician

Sir William Johnstone, 2nd Baronet of Sciennes and Westerhall was a Scottish landowner and politician who sat in the Parliament of Scotland from 1698 to 1707 and in the British House of Commons at various times between 1708 and 1722.

== Early life ==
Johnstone was the second son of Sir James Johnstone of Westerhall, a member of the pre-Union Parliament of Scotland. His mother Margaret was the daughter of John Bannatyne of Corehouse in Lanarkshire. He married Henrietta Johnston, the daughter and coheiress of James Johnston of Sciennes, Edinburgh before 1698. His elder brother John was an MP and became a baronet.

== Career ==
Johnstone was a political ally of his distant relation the Earl of Annandale. In the Parliament of Scotland he was a member from 1698 to 1707 for the burgh of Annan, of which Annandale was the patron. He initially supported the Union with England, and when Annandale shifted towards opposing it, Johnstone intermittently joined him.

After the Union, Johnstone received the continuing support of Lord Annandale. At the 1708 general election, he was involved in a double return at Dumfries Burghs and was declared elected Member of Parliament on 30 November 1708. He did not make much impression apart from voting against the impeachment of Dr Sacheverell, and did not stand at the 1710 general election. On the death of his brother on 30 September 1711 he succeeded to the baronetcy and Westerhall estate. In 1712 he became a councilor of Lochmaben. He was returned unopposed as MP for Dumfries Burghs at a by election on 9 May 1713, and at the 1713 general election was returned unopposed again for Dumfries Burghs and also elected MP for Dumfriesshire. Although he unusually continued to represent both seats in Parliament, he again made little contribution. In 1714, he voted against the expulsion of Richard Steele, and for extending the schism bill to cover Catholic education. He was in favour of the Hanoverian succession, but cooperated with Jacobites on Scottish matters. At the 1715 general election he was returned as MP for Dumfriesshire alone and appears to have supported the Administration, although his only recorded vote was for the Peerage Bill in 1719. During the Jacobite rebellion, he made effective preparations in fortifying Dumfries, so that the rebels did not attack the town, and reported on the military progress of the rebels, as Annandale's representative in Dumfriesshire. However Annandale died in 1721 and Johnstone was on poor terms with his successor the second Marquess who had him removed from the council at Locmaben. Johnstone appealed to the Convention and was re-instated, but did not stand at the 1722 general election.

== Later life and legacy ==
Johnstone's younger son, John, married Annandale's stepmother which exacerbated the ill-feeling between the families. In 1726 the Marquess tried to prevent his titles and lands descending collaterally to ‘a certain family of Johnstone’, by which he was acting against his stepmother and the Johnstones of Westerhall.

Johnstone died on 8 October 1727, leaving two sons. He was succeeded in the baronetcy by his son James, who was MP for Dumfries Burghs from 1743 to 1754.

Parliament of Great Britain
New constituency	Member of Parliament for Dumfries Burghs; 1708–1710	Succeeded by John Hutton
Preceded by John Hutton	Member of Parliament for Dumfries Burghs; May 1713 – 1715	Succeeded by Alexander Fergusson
Preceded by James Murray	Member of Parliament for Dumfriesshire; 1713–1722	Succeeded by Charles Erskine
Baronetage of Nova Scotia
Preceded by John Johnstone	Baronet (of Westerhall); 1711–1727	Succeeded by James Johnstone
