= Sir John Johnstone, 6th Baronet =

Sir John Lowther Johnstone, 6th Baronet (1783–1811) was a British Army officer and politician.

== Life ==
He was the son of George Johnstone, who died in 1787, and his wife Charlotte Dee. His mother married again, in 1790, to Charles Edmund Nugent.

Johnstone was brought up in the expectation of inheriting from his paternal uncle, the wealthy Sir William Pulteney, 5th Baronet, a property developer who died in 1805, and who had changed his surname from Johnstone. He left one child, Laura Pulteney, 1st Countess of Bath, who died in 1808. In consequence of his uncle's death, Johnstone became 6th Baronet, and inherited a Scottish estate in Dumfriesshire.

Johnstone had joined the Coldstream Guards in 1800, with rank of ensign, and fallen into bad company. Through the Duke of Cumberland he was given a staff position with General Richard Vyse, but continued to run up heavy debts and make unwise associations.

In 1806 Johnstone left the army, aiming to enter politics. He was defeated for Dumfriesshire in the 1806 general election. His opponent, William Johnstone Hope, had been selected and won the seat in 1804 for the Tories, when William Pulteney had (it was rumoured) been trying to bring in Robert Cutlar Fergusson, a barrister who had been imprisoned after an affray at a 1799 treason trial. There was much interest in the 1806 contest. Patrick Miller, who had ten years before broken with his patron William Douglas, 4th Duke of Queensberry and joined the Whig Club, contacted Charles James Fox about it. Sir John Heron Maxwell, a Tory passed over in 1804, might have run and split the vote. Johnstone had backing from Lord Grenville, James Maitland, 8th Earl of Lauderdale and William Adam of Blair Adam. It was enough to make a contest of it, but no more, Johnstone losing by 26 votes to 34. He undertook to stand again, and had the chance in the 1807 general election, but did not on that occasion.

The death of his cousin the Countess of Bath in 1808 then made Johnstone patron of Weymouth and Melcombe Regis. One of its members, Gabriel Tucker Steward, resigned from parliament in 1810, giving Johnstone a chance to stand as replacement. Johnstone made an uncontested entry into parliament in June of that year. In detail, the estate of the Countess of Bath went (personal property) to Elizabeth Evelyn Sutton, divorced wife of George Markham; (Pulteney estate) to the Earl of Darlington; and the Weymouth estate, estates in Scotland and America, and other English properties, to Johnstone.

The History of Parliament and a contemporary newspaper account state that Johnstone died on 24 December 1811, the latter giving the place of death as Baker Street, London. According to The History and Antiquities of the Borough and Town of Weymouth and Melcombe (1829) by George Alfred Ellis, Johnstone died of delirium tremens in the House of Commons, on 19 March 1811.

== Family ==
Johnstone married Charlotte Gordon, daughter of Charles Gordon of Cluny, Aberdeen. Her father was a Writer to the Signet in Edinburgh, and the brother of Cosmo Gordon, and the planter Alexander Gordon of Tobago: they were sons of John Gordon of Cluny who died in 1769. Charles Gordon married Joanna Trotter, and they had a family of at least three sons and three daughters. Their daughter Jo(h)anna married in 1804 John William Dalrymple, a marriage later contested in a court case. Known as Charles Gordon of Braid, after his estate outside Edinburgh, the father died in 1814. When Alexander Gordon of Tobago died in 1801, he left monetary legacies to the three daughters of Charles Gordon, his nieces, and two of the sons, John and Alexander, received compensation money for the enslaved people on his Tobago estates in 1839.

The History of Parliament states that Johnstone's marriage was in 1804. John Malcolm Bulloch in his Gordons of Cluny wrote that Charlotte had been expected to marry James Dalziel of Binns, and that the marriage took place in Edinburgh on 18 May 1805, Johnstone being then a captain.

The couple had one son and two daughters:

- Sir Frederick George Johnstone, 7th Baronet
- Charlotte Margaret, married in 1831 Rev. Henry William Buckley
- Anne Elizabeth, married in 1830 Edmund Hiley Bucknall Estcourt, and was mother of George Sotheron-Estcourt, 1st Baron Estcourt.

After Johnstone's death, his estates were put in the hands of trustees (the Duke of Cumberland, Viscount Newark, Masterton Ure and David Cathcart); who also acted as legal guardians to his children. Charlotte wrote in 1812 to James Brougham, referring particularly to the Weymouth constituency, and explaining that it completely cut out any influence she might have on candidates.

Charlotte in 1820 married Richard Weyland. They had two sons and one daughter. The daughter Elizabeth married in 1844 James Grimston, 2nd Earl of Verulam.
