= White Lion Inn, Stratford-upon-Avon =

Historical inn in Stratford-upon-Avon

The White Lion Inn

General information
- Architectural style: Black and white timber frame
- Location: Stratford-upon-Avon, England
- Coordinates: 52°11′39″N 1°42′31″W
- Completed: 1541

The White Lion Inn was a public house located in Henley Street, Stratford-upon-Avon, England, an example of Elizabethan architecture that first appears in historical records in 1591. The building was mentioned by both Harriet Beecher Stowe and Rupert Graves.

== History ==
The earliest references to the White Lion Inn date to 1591. The original building, which was at nos, 16, 17, 18 Henley Street was demolished and rebuilt in 1753 making it one of the largest inns on the Holyhead Road by its landlord at the time, John Payton.

In its heyday the White Lion Inn was considered to be on a par with some of the better eating establishments in London and was reported to offer “a bill of fare equal to that of the Piazza Coffee House”. In 1785 members of the household of Louis XVI of France stayed here and in 1806 the Prince Regent (later George IV of the United Kingdom) stayed in specially prepared apartments. During the English Civil War the building was taken over by parliamentary soldiers.

In 1765 the smallpox census records thirty-nine people as living there (only two had not had the pox).

The Garrick Jubilee of Shakespearean performances in 1769 came about because of an idea by John Payton, the landlord of the White Lion. Payton was a genuine Shakespeare enthusiast and a friend of the Shakespearian editor George Alexander Steevens. In 1768, when Steevens was staying at the White Lion, Payton invited some of his friends from the town corporation to meet him. The new Town Hall had just been finished and it was regretted "that an open niche had been constructed on the north side of it without any prospect of obtaining a statue or even a bust to grace it". A statue of Shakespeare was suggested as the most fitting adornment and Steevens offered to persuade David Garrick to present one. The corporation elaborated on his suggestions by offering to confer on Garrick the freedom of the borough in a box made from the wood of Shakespeare's mulberry tree. This led Garrick not only to present a statue of Shakespeare, but to come down and organize a Shakespearian festival at Stratford.

The remaining portions of the building were added to the English Heritage list of protected buildings in 1994.
