= Sir James Johnstone, 3rd Baronet =

Scottish baronet & politician (1697-1772)

Sir James Johnstone, 3rd Baronet (9 February 1697 – 10 December 1772) was a Scottish baronet and politician. He sat in the House of Commons of Great Britain from 1743 to 1754.

Sir James was the son of Sir William Johnstone, 2nd Baronet. In 1719 he married Barbara Murray, daughter of Alexander Murray, 4th Lord Elibank. They had 14 children: 8 sons and 6 daughters, including Margaret Ogilvy. Johnstone succeeded to his father's baronetcy in 1727.

He was the MP for Dumfries Burghs from 1743 to 1754.

He was succeeded in the baronetcy by his son James (1726–1794), who became MP for Dumfries Burghs and then for Weymouth.

Parliament of Great Britain
Preceded by Lord John Johnstone	Member of Parliament for Dumfries Burghs; 1743–1754	Succeeded by Archibald Douglas
Baronetage of Nova Scotia
Preceded by William Johnstone	Baronet (of Westerhall); 1727–1772	Succeeded by James Johnstone
