= Rumbold =

Rumbold is a surname and may refer to:

- Dame Angela Rumbold (1932–2010), British politician
- Caroline Thomas Rumbold (1877–1949), American botanist
- Charles Rumbold (1788–1857), British politician
- Charlotte Rumbold (1869–1960), American urban planner
- George Rumbold (1911–1995), English footballer
- Gyula Rumbold (1887–1959), Hungarian amateur footballer who competed in the 1912 Summer Olympics
- Hugo Rumbold (1884–1932), British theatrical scenery and costume designer
- Jack Rumbold (1920–2001), New Zealand Royal Navy officer, barrister, colonial administrator and first-class cricketer
- Karl Rumbold (1893–1971), Austrian football player and manager
- Richard Rumbold (1622–1685), English soldier who plotted to assassinate Charles II of England
- William Richard Rumbold (1760–1786), English Member of Parliament
- Rumbold baronets including:
  - Thomas Rumbold (1736–1791), 1st Baronet, British politician and administrator in India
  - Sir George Rumbold, 2nd Baronet (1764–1807), British diplomat
  - Arthur Carlos Henry Rumbold, 5th Baronet (1820–1869), British soldier and diplomat
  - Sir Horace Rumbold, 8th Baronet (1829–1913), British diplomat
  - Sir Horace Rumbold, 9th Baronet (1869–1941), British diplomat
  - Sir Anthony Rumbold, 10th Baronet (1911–1983), British diplomat

== Characters ==
- Cuthbert Rumbold, a character in the sitcom Are You Being Served?

== See also ==
- St. Rumbold of Buckingham (662), English infant saint
- Saint Rumbold of Mechelen (6th/7th/8th century?), Irish or Scottish Christian missionary
- St. Rumbold's Cathedral, Mechelen, Antwerp, Belgium
- Rumwold (disambiguation)
- Rumbolt
