= Sir Charles Davers, 6th Baronet =

British politician

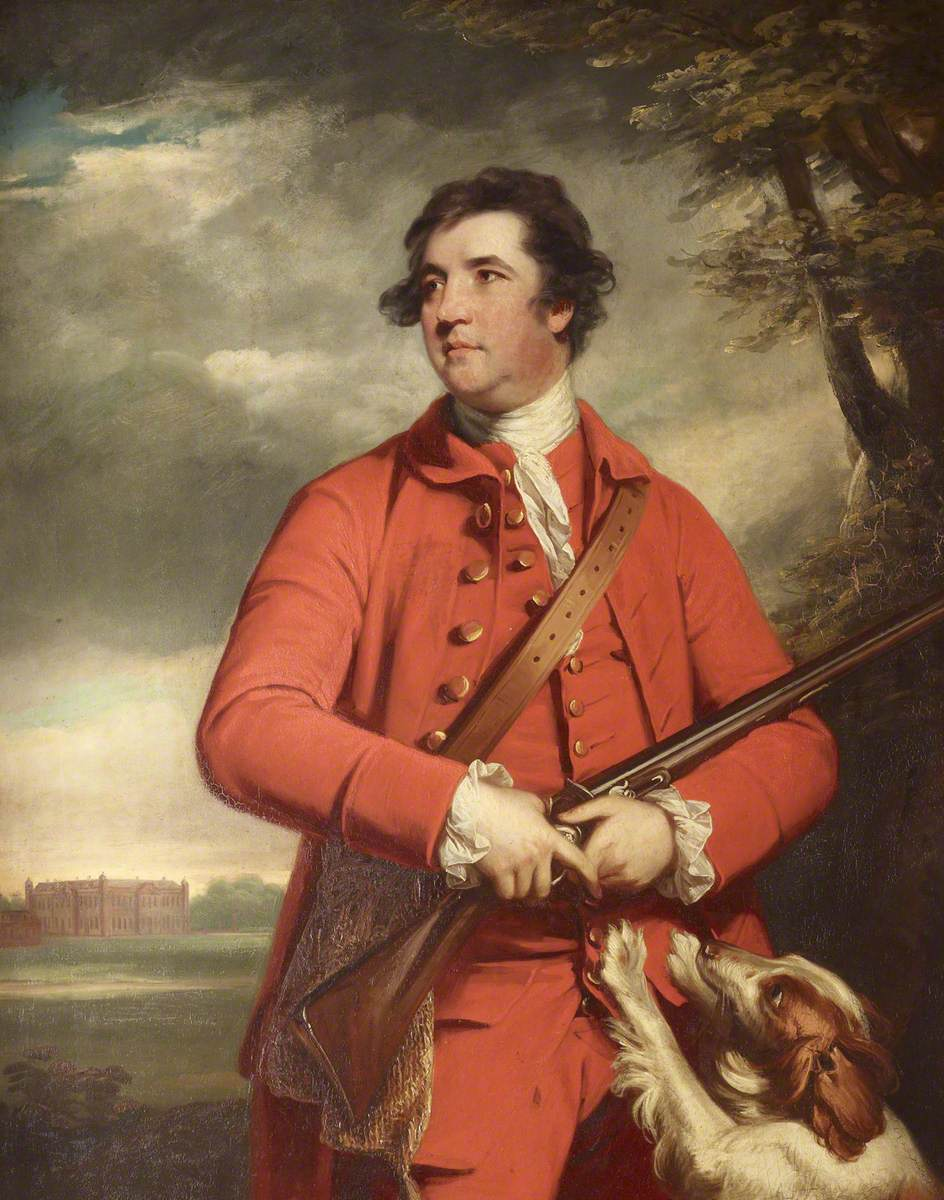
- Sir Charles Davers by Joshua Reynolds
- Born: 4 June 1737
- Died: 4 June 1806 (aged 69)
- Buried: St Nicholas Church, Rushbrooke
- Father: Sir Jermyn Davers, 4th Baronet
- Mother: Margaretta Green
- Occupation: Army officer and politician

Sir Charles Davers, 6th Baronet (4 June 1737 – 4 June 1806) was a British Army officer and politician who sat in the House of Commons from 1768 to 1802.

== Early life and military career ==
Davers was the second surviving son of Sir Jermyn Davers, 4th Baronet, MP and Margaretta Green. He was brought up at Rushbrooke Hall in Suffolk and educated at King Edward VI School (Bury St Edmunds) and Trinity College, Cambridge, where he graduated in 1755. He then undertook the Grand Tour.

Davers became an officer in the British Army in 1758, being commissioned into the 44th (East Essex) Regiment of Foot. He served in North America during the Seven Years' War. In January 1761 he was promoted to the rank of Captain while in the service of the 99th Regiment of Foot. He was garrisoned in Ireland in 1766 and was promoted to Major.

== Political career ==
In 1763 Davers inherited his brother's baronetcy and estates. In the 1768 general election he was elected as the Member of Parliament for Weymouth. At the 1774 general election he was returned as MP for Bury St Edmunds. Davers held his seat in the House of Commons due to his close personal alliance with Augustus FitzRoy, 3rd Duke of Grafton. Grafton encouraged him to cultivate his family interest in Bury at the expense of Davers' brother-in-law, Frederick Hervey, 4th Earl of Bristol. Davers publicly aligned himself against William Pitt the Younger, but did not become a Whig and retained his independence.

== Personal life ==
Davers lived at Rushbrooke Hall with Frances Treice, by whom he had five illegitimate sons and three illegitimate daughters. He was rumoured to have earlier married Miss Coutts, a planter's daughter, in America while serving in the army, and to have had a son, Rushbrook.

On his death in 1806 he was buried at St Nicholas Church, Rushbrooke. He left his estates to his nephew, Frederick Hervey, 1st Marquess of Bristol. On the presumption of there being no surviving legitimate male heirs, his baronetcy became extinct.

Parliament of Great Britain
Preceded by Charles Walcott; Richard Jackson; Richard Glover; John Tucker	Member of Parliament for Weymouth; 1768–1774; With: The Lord Waltham; Jeremiah Dyson; John Tucker	Succeeded by Welbore Ellis; William Chaffin Grove; John Purling; John Tucker
Preceded by Hon. Augustus Hervey	Member of Parliament for Bury St Edmunds. 1774–1802; With: Hon. Augustus Hervey 1774–1775; Henry Seymour Conway 1775–1784; Hon. George FitzRoy 1784–1787; Lord Charles FitzRoy 1787–1796; Lord Hervey 1796–1802	Succeeded by Lord Charles FitzRoy; Lord Hervey
Baronetage of England
Preceded by Robert Davers	Baronet (of Rougham); 1763–1806	Extinct
