= John Tucker (MP) =

British politician (??–1779)

John Tucker (died 1779) was a British politician who sat in the House of Commons between 1735 and 1778.

Tucker was the son of Edward Tucker. He married Martha Gollop daughter of George Gollop of Berwick, Dorset.

Tucker was Mayor of Weymouth in 1726 and 1732. He entered Parliament on 28 February 1735 as Member of Parliament for Weymouth and Melcombe Regis when George Bubb Dodington decided to sit for Bridgwater. He succeeded his father in 1739 and like his father, he followed Dodington, joining him to take control of Weymouth and Melcombe Regis from Walpole in 1741. Dodington was a general political fixer. In 1744 Tucker became cashier to Treasurer of the Navy. He did not stand in the 1747 general election because his post became incompatible with a seat in the Commons under the Place Act 1742. He lost his post in 1749, when Dodington joined the Prince of Wales faction. In about 1750 Egmont described him to Frederick as the 'absolute creature' of Dodington.

In 1754 Tucker was Mayor of Weymouth and in the 1754 general election was elected MP for Weymouth and Melcombe Regis.He was appointed Paymaster of the Marines in 1757 and held the post until his death. He was re-elected MP for Weymouth in 1761. In May 1762, a seat was required for George Grenville, and Dodington undertook to persuade Tucker to vacate his seat. Tucker was unwilling and two months later July 1762 Dodington died and Tucker was left in undisputed control at Weymouth. Dodington left all his property at Weymouth and Melcombe Regis to Tucker. Tucker retained control until his death, giving two seats to Government at each general election. He was Mayor of Weymouth again in 1763. In 1768 he was re-elected at Weymouth. He was appointed Keeper of the King's private roads in 1770 and held the post until his death. He was Mayor of Weymouth in 1772. In 1774 he was returned again in at Weymouth but gave up his seat in June 1778 in favour of his nephew Gabriel Steward.

Tucker died on 9 October 1779.

Parliament of Great Britain
Preceded by Welbore Ellis; Lord George Cavendish; George Dodington; Edward Hungate Beaghan	Member of Parliament for Weymouth and Melcombe Regis; 1754–1778; With: Welbore Ellis 1754-1761; Lord John Cavendish 1754-1761; George Dodington 1754-1761; Sir Francis Dashwood 1761-1763; John Olmius 1761-1762; Richard Glover 1761-1768; Richard Jackson 1762-1768; Charles Walcott 1763-1768; The Lord Waltham 1768-1774; Sir Charles Davers 1768-1774; Jeremiah Dyson 1768-1774; Welbore Ellis 1774-1778; William Chaffin Grove 1774-1778; John Purling 1774-1778	Succeeded by Welbore Ellis; William Chaffin Grove; John Purling; Gabriel Steward
