= George Floyd Duckett =

English antiquarian and lexicographer

Sir George Floyd Duckett, 3rd Baronet (27 March 1811 – 13 May 1902) was an English army officer, antiquarian and lexicographer. He wrote on his Duckett ancestry, his paternal grandfather having married a Duckett heiress.

== Life ==
Born at 15 Spring Gardens, Westminster, London in 1811, he was the eldest child of Sir George Duckett, 2nd Baronet (1777–1856), M.P. for Lymington, by his first wife Isabella (1781–1844), daughter of Stainbank Floyd of Barnard Castle; his grandfather Sir George Jackson, 1st Baronet assumed the surname of Duckett in 1797, having married the heiress of that family. After attending private schools at Putney and Wimbledon Common, he was at Harrow School from 1820 to 1823, when he was placed with a private tutor in Bedfordshire. In 1827–8 he studied German at Gotha and Dresden. Matriculating on 13 December 1828 as a gentleman commoner of Christ Church, Oxford, he spent much time hunting, and left the university without a degree.

Joining the West Essex Corps of Yeomanry Cavalry, Duckett on 4 May 1832 was commissioned a sub-lieutenant in the 2nd Regiment of Life Guards. On his coming of age in 1832, his father was ruined by speculations. Duckett then exchanged for financial reasons from the Guards in 1834 into the 15th Hussars, and subsequently into the 82nd Regiment, in which he remained until 1839. Having obtained his company, he exchanged in 1839 into the 87th Fusiliers, and joined its depot in Dublin. He took leave to work on a book. On resuming his commission on full pay he was placed at the bottom of the captains' list of the reserve battalion of the 69th Regiment.

On the death of his father on 15 June 1856 Duckett became the third baronet, and began to write as an antiquarian. He was elected Fellow of the Society of Antiquaries of London on 11 February 1869. In old age blindness put an end to his literary activities. He died at Cleeve House, Cleeve, Somerset, in 1902, at the age of 91, and was buried in the cemetery at Wells, Somerset.

== Works ==
In the later part of his military career, Duckett concentrated on the compilation of a Technological Military Dictionary, in German, English, and French. He obtained leave to visit the arsenals of Woolwich, Paris, Brussels, and Berlin; and to complete the book he retired on half-pay. It was published in the autumn of 1848, and its merits were recognised by gold medals from Franz Joseph I of Austria in 1850, Frederick William IV of Prussia, and Napoleon III. At home the book had little impact.

In 1869 Duckett published Duchetiana, or Historical and Genealogical Memoirs of the Family of Duket, from the Conquest to the Present Time (enlarged edit. 1874). In it he claimed descent from Gundrada de Warenne and a title to a dormant barony, Wyndesore. In Observations on the Parentage of Gundreda (1877; Lewes, 1878) he argued that Gundrada was daughter of William the Conqueror. He researched the history of Lewes Priory, which Gundrada was reputed to have founded. He privately printed Record Evidences among the Archives of the Ancient Abbey of Cluni from 1077 to 1534 (1886); and a compilation Monasticon Cluniacense Anglicanum, Charters and Records among the Archives of the Ancient Abbey of Cluni from 1077 to 1534 (2 vols., privately printed, Lewes, 1888). There followed Visitations of English Cluniac Foundations, 1262–1279 (1890); and Visitations and Chapters-General of the Order of Cluni (1893). For the Monasticon Cluniacense he received in 1888 the decoration of an officer of public instruction in France.

Duckett published also contributions to local archæological societies, and:

- The Marches of Wales (Arch. Cambrensis), 1881.
- Manorbeer Castle and its Early Owners (Arch. Cambrensis), 1882.
- Brief Notices on Monastic and Ecclesiastical Costume, 1890.

He edited:

- Original Letters of the Duke of Monmouth, in the Bodleian Library (Camden Soc.), 1879;
- The Sheriffs of Westmorland (Cumb. and Westm. Ant. and Arch. Soc.), 1879;
- Evidences of Harewood Castle in Yorkshire (Yorksh. Arch. Jo.), 1881;
- 'Description of the County of Westmorland, by Sir Daniel Fleming of Rydal (Cumb. and Westm. Ant. and Arch. Soc.), 1882;
- Penal Laws and Test Act under James II (original returns to the commissioners' inquiries of 1687-8), 3 vols., privately printed, 1882–3;
- Naval Commissioners, from 12 Charles II to 1 George III, 1660–1760, 1890;
- Evidences of the Barri Family of Manorbeer and Olethan (Arch. Cambrensis), 1891.

He also translated from the German Mariolatry, Worship of the Virgin; the Doctrine refuted by Scripture (1892). Duckett in 1895 published his Anecdotal Reminiscences of an Octo-nonagenarian.

== Family ==
Duckett married on 21 June 1845 Isabella (d. 31 Dec. 1901), daughter of Sir Lionel Smith, 1st Baronet. They had no issue, and the baronetcy became extinct.

== Notes ==
Attribution

This article incorporates text from a publication now in the public domain: Lee, Sidney, ed. (1912). "Duckett, George Floyd". Dictionary of National Biography (2nd supplement). Vol. 1. London: Smith, Elder & Co.

Baronetage of Great Britain
Preceded by George Duckett	Baronet (of Hartham House); 1856–1902	Extinct
