= Richard Jackson (colonial agent) =

British lawyer and politician (1721–1787)

Richard Jackson, KC (c. 1721 – 6 May 1787), nicknamed "Omniscient Jackson", was a British lawyer and politician who sat in the House of Commons from 1762 to 1784. A King's Counsel, he acted as Official Solicitor or counsel of the Lords Commissioners for Trade and Plantations, owner of lands in New England, and colonial agent of Connecticut.

Jackson was called to the bar in 1744; he became a bencher of Lincoln's Inn in 1770 and its treasurer in 1780. He was a teacher of law in the Inner and Middle Temples; among his students was William Franklin, son of Benjamin Franklin. Jackson was a collaborator in Franklins' political interests during their London years. He was also Member of Parliament for Weymouth and Melcombe Regis from 1762 to 1768 and for New Romney from 1768 until 1784, and was one of the Lords of the Treasury from 1782 to 1783. In 1781, he was elected a Fellow of the Society of Antiquaries.

Parliament of Great Britain
Preceded by Sir Francis Dashwood; John Olmius; Richard Glover; John Tucker	Member of Parliament for Weymouth and Melcombe Regis; 1762–1768; With: Sir Francis Dashwood 1762-1763; Richard Glover; John Tucker; Charles Walcott 1763-1768	Succeeded by The Lord Waltham; Sir Charles Davers; Jeremiah Dyson; John Tucker
Preceded by Sir Edward Dering; Thomas Knight	Member of Parliament for New Romney; 1768–1784; With: Sir Edward Dering; John Morton; Sir Edward Dering	Succeeded by Sir Edward Dering; John Smith
