= Drigue Olmius, 2nd Baron Waltham =

British politician

Drigue Billers Olmius, 2nd Baron Waltham (12 March 1746 – 10 December 1786 or 10 February 1787), was a British politician.

Olmius was the son of John Olmius, 1st Baron Waltham, by Anne, daughter of Sir William Billers, Lord Mayor of London in 1733. He succeeded his father in the barony in October 1762, aged 16. This was an Irish peerage and gave him a seat in the Irish House of Lords although not in the English House of Lords. In 1768 he was returned to parliament as one of four representatives for Weymouth and Melcombe Regis, a seat he held until 1774. From 1784 until his death in 1787 he sat as Member of Parliament for Maldon.

Lord Waltham died childless in February 1787, aged 40, when the barony became extinct. He was succeeded in the family estates by his sister, the Honourable Elizabeth. She was the wife of John Luttrell, 3rd Earl of Carhampton, who assumed the additional surname of Olmius. His widow Frances Coe whom he married in 1767 died on 25 October 1819 in her 76th year.

Parliament of Great Britain
Preceded by John Tucker; Richard Glover; Richard Jackson; Charles Walcott	Member of Parliament for Weymouth and Melcombe Regis; 1768–1774; With: John Tucker; Sir Charles Davers, Bt; Jeremiah Dyson	Succeeded by John Tucker; Welbore Ellis; William Chaffin Grove; John Purling
Preceded by John Strutt; Eliab Harvey	Member of Parliament for Maldon; 1784–1787; With: John Strutt	Succeeded by John Strutt; Sir Peter Parker, Bt
Peerage of Ireland
Preceded by John Olmius	Baron Waltham; 1762–1787	Extinct
