= John Whitehill =

John Whitehill may refer to:

- John Whitehill (representative), member of the U.S. House of Representatives from Pennsylvania
- John Whitehill (governor), East India Company officer, twice temporary governor of Madras
