= Jeremiah Dyson =

British civil servant and politician

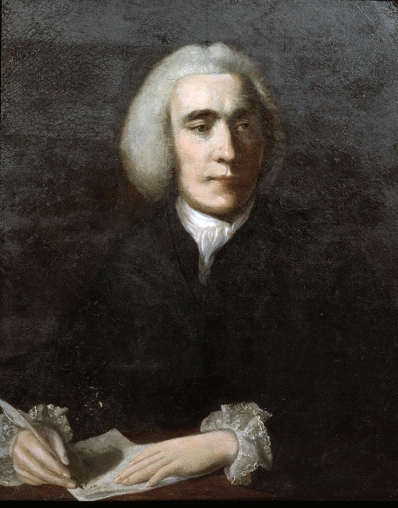
Jeremiah Dyson.

Jeremiah Dyson (1722 – 16 September 1776) was a British civil servant and politician.

== Biography ==
He studied at the University of Edinburgh and matriculated at Leiden University in 1742. He settled a pension on his friend Mark Akenside, the poet and physician, and later defended Akenside's The Pleasures of the Imagination against William Warburton. He was a friend of Samuel Richardson.

He purchased the clerkship of House of Commons in 1748, and became a Tory after George III's accession. He discontinued the practice of selling the clerkships subordinate to his office. He was Member of Parliament for Yarmouth, Isle of Wight 1762–8, for Weymouth and Melcombe Regis, 1768–74, and for Horsham, 1774. He was appointed a commissioner for the Board of Trade, 1764–8; a Lord of the Treasury, 1768–74; and a Privy Counsellor in 1774.

He supported Lord North's treatment of the American colonies. Isaac Barré nicknamed him "Mungo" (the black slave in Isaac Bickerstaffe's The Padlock), for his noted attention to parliamentary business.

Political offices
| Preceded by Hans Stanley | Cofferer of the Household; 1774–1776 | Succeeded by Hans Stanley |
Parliament of Great Britain
| Preceded by The Lord Holmes; Henry Holmes | Member of Parliament for Yarmouth (Isle of Wight); 1762–1768; With: The Lord Holmes 1762–1764; John Eames 1765–1768 | Succeeded by William Strode; Jervoise Clarke |
| Preceded by John Tucker; Richard Glover; Richard Jackson; Charles Walcott | Member of Parliament for Weymouth and Melcombe Regis; 1768–1774; With: John Tucker; The Lord Waltham; Sir Charles Davers, Bt | Succeeded by John Tucker; Welbore Ellis; William Chaffin Grove; John Purling |
| Preceded by Robert Pratt; James Wallace | Member of Parliament for Horsham; 1774–1776; With: James Wallace | Succeeded by James Wallace; The Earl of Drogheda |
