= Welbore Ellis, 1st Baron Mendip =

British politician (1713–1802)

The Right Honourable The Lord Mendip PC FRS
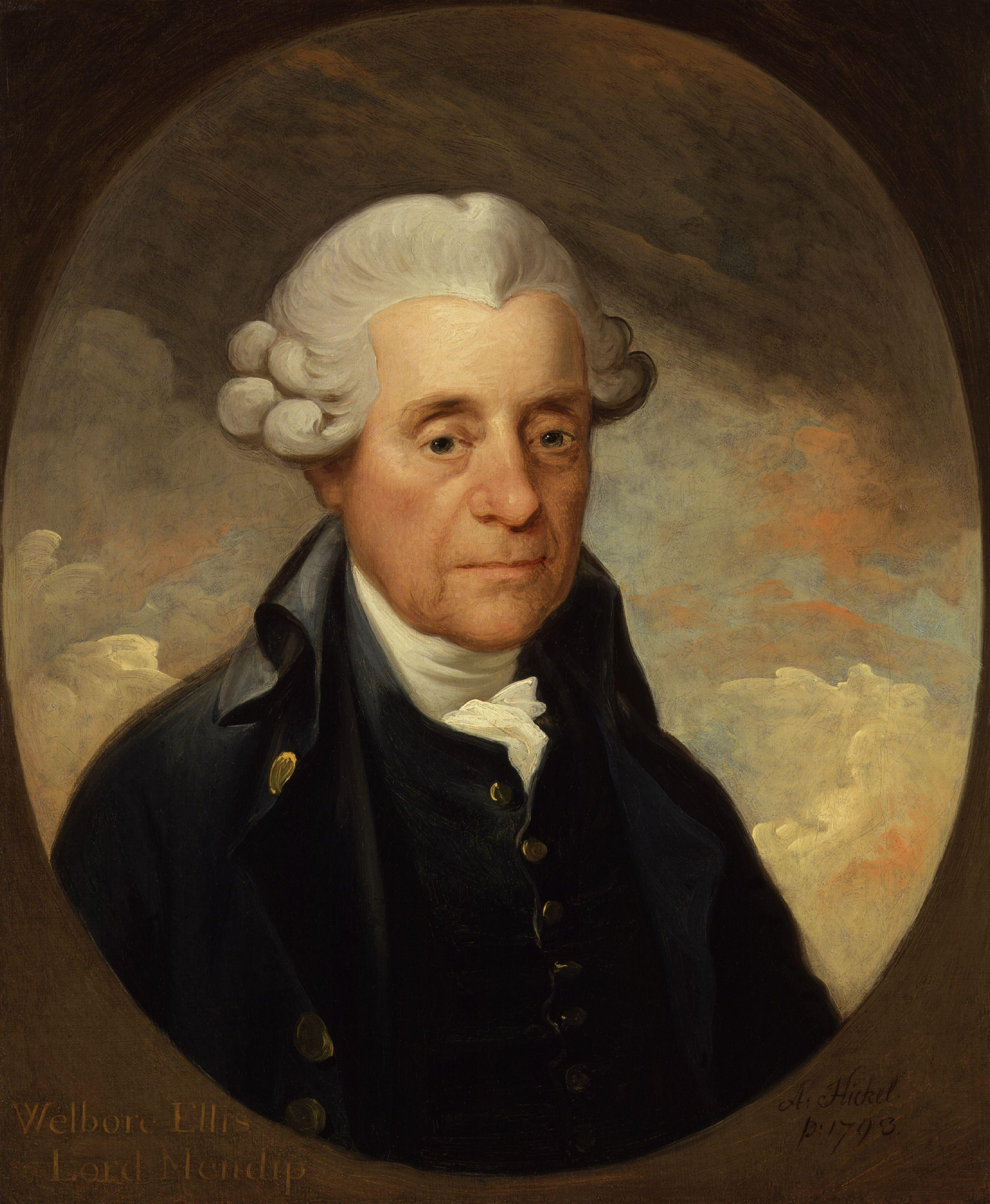
- Portrait of Mendip by Anton Hickel

Secretary of State for the Colonies
- In office February 1782 – 8 March 1782
- Monarch: George III
- Prime Minister: Lord North
- Preceded by: Lord George Germain
- Succeeded by: Office abolished

Personal details
- Born: 15 December 1713 England
- Died: 2 February 1802 (aged 88) England

Welbore Ellis, 1st Baron Mendip, PC, FRS (15 December 1713 – 2 February 1802) was a British politician who represented Cricklade, Weymouth and Melcombe Regis, Aylesbury and Petersfield in the House of Commons of Great Britain from 1741 to 1794 when he was raised to the peerage as Baron Mendip. He held a number of political offices, including briefly serving as Secretary for the Colonies in 1782 during the American War of Independence.

== Background ==
Ellis was the second but only surviving son of the Most Reverend Welbore Ellis, Bishop of Kildare and Bishop of Meath. He was educated at Westminster School from 1727 to 1732 and then entered Christ Church, Oxford.

== Political career ==
In 1741, he was elected Member of Parliament (MP) for Cricklade, then moved to Weymouth and Melcombe Regis (1747–1761), Aylesbury (1761–1768), Petersfield (1768–1774), Weymouth and Melcombe Regis (1774–1790) and Petersfield (1791–1794).

In 1762, he succeeded Charles Townshend as Secretary at War, and in 1763, he proposed the appropriation of twenty army regiments to the colonies of America. In Parliament, with many others, he opposed the reception of papers from the American Continental Congress. He became Treasurer of the Navy in 1777, then succeeded to the Colonial Secretaryship in 1782, which he held for a matter of months, before the American colonies were lost. In 1784, he became the longest-serving member of the House of Commons (having served for 43 years non-continuously), becoming the honorary Father of the House.

He was created Baron Mendip, of Mendip in the County of Somerset, in 1794 in recognition of his governmental service. The peerage was created with remainder to the three eldest sons of his sister Anne by her husband Henry Agar, of Gowran and Gowran Castle.

== Personal life ==
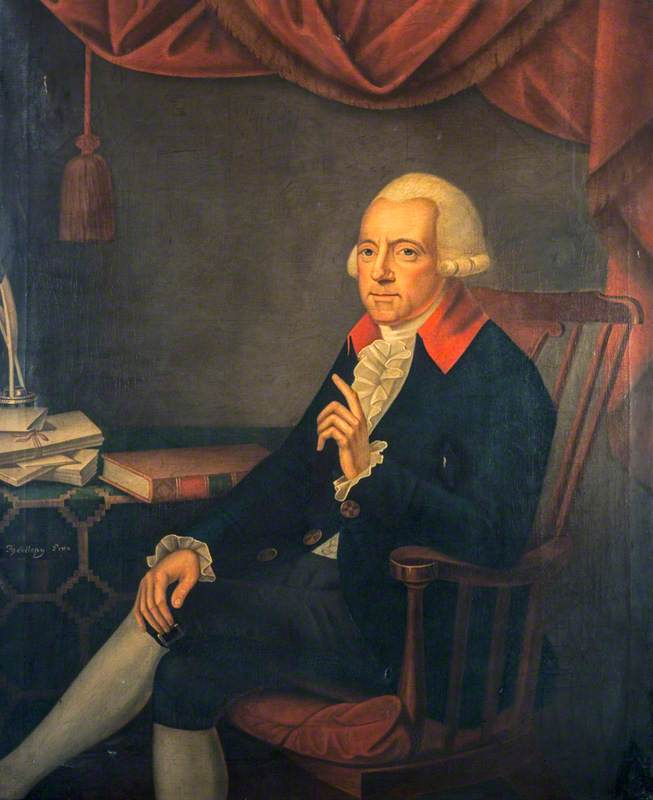
Portrait of Mendip by Timothy Collopy

In 1738 he inherited a large fortune from his uncle, John Ellis and built Clifden House in Brentford.

He married firstly in 1747 Elizabeth, the daughter and heiress of Sir William Stanhope and secondly in 1765 Anne, the daughter of George Stanley of Paultons, Hampshire. Ellis nevertheless died childless in February 1802, aged 88, and was succeeded in the barony according to the special remainder by his great-nephew, Henry Welbore Agar, 2nd Viscount Clifden, who assumed the surname of Ellis two years later.

== See also ==
- Viscount Clifden

Parliament of Great Britain
Preceded by Sir Thomas Reade, Bt; Charles Gore	Member of Parliament for Cricklade; 1741–1747; With: Sir Thomas Reade, Bt	Succeeded by John Gore; William Rawlinson Earle
Preceded by John Tucker; Joseph Damer; John Raymond; James Steuart	Member of Parliament for Weymouth and Melcombe Regis; 1747–1761; With: Richard Plumer 1747–51; George Dodington 1747–54; Edward Hungate Beaghan 1747–54; Lord George Cavendish 1751–54; Lord John Cavendish 1754–61; George Dodington 1754–61; John Tucker 1754–61	Succeeded by John Tucker; Sir Francis Dashwood, Bt; John Olmius; Richard Glover
Preceded by John Willes; John Wilkes	Member of Parliament for Aylesbury; 1761–1768; With: John Wilkes 1761–64; Anthony Bacon 1764–68	Succeeded by Anthony Bacon; John Durand
Preceded by John Jolliffe; Richard Croftes	Member of Parliament for Petersfield; 1768–1774; With: William Joliffe	Succeeded by William Joliffe; Sir Abraham Hume, Bt
Preceded by John Tucker; The Lord Waltham; Sir Charles Davers, Bt; Jeremiah Dyson	Member of Parliament for Weymouth and Melcombe Regis; 1774–1790; With: John Tucker 1774–78; William Chaffin Grove 1774–81; John Purling 1774–90; Gabriel Steward 1778–80, 1780–16 & 1788–90; Warren Lisle 1780; William Richard Rumbold 1781–84; Sir Thomas Rumbold, Bt 1784–90; George Jackson 1786–88	Succeeded by Sir James Pulteney; Richard Johnstone; Andrew Stuart; Thomas Jones
Preceded by William Joliffe; Marquess of Titchfield	Member of Parliament for Petersfield; 1791–1795; With: William Joliffe	Succeeded by William Joliffe; Charles Greville
Political offices
Preceded by Charles Townshend	Secretary at War; 1762–1765	Succeeded by The Viscount Barrington
Preceded by Sir Gilbert Elliot, Bt	Treasurer of the Navy; 1777–1782	Succeeded by Isaac Barré
Preceded by The Lord George Germain	Secretary of State for the Colonies; 1782	Succeeded by —
Preceded by Charles Frederick	Father of the House; 1784–1790	Succeeded by William Drake
Peerage of Great Britain
New creation	Baron Mendip; 1794–1802	Succeeded by Henry Welbore Ellis
