= Elizabeth Draper =

Elizabeth Draper may refer to:

- Eliza Draper (1744–1778), subject of Journal to Eliza by Laurence Sterne
- Betty Draper, Elizabeth Draper, fictional character in TV series, Mad Men
