= Cape Jackson =

Peninsula in Marlborough, New Zealand

Cape Jackson Te Taonui-a-Kupe (Māori)
- Cape
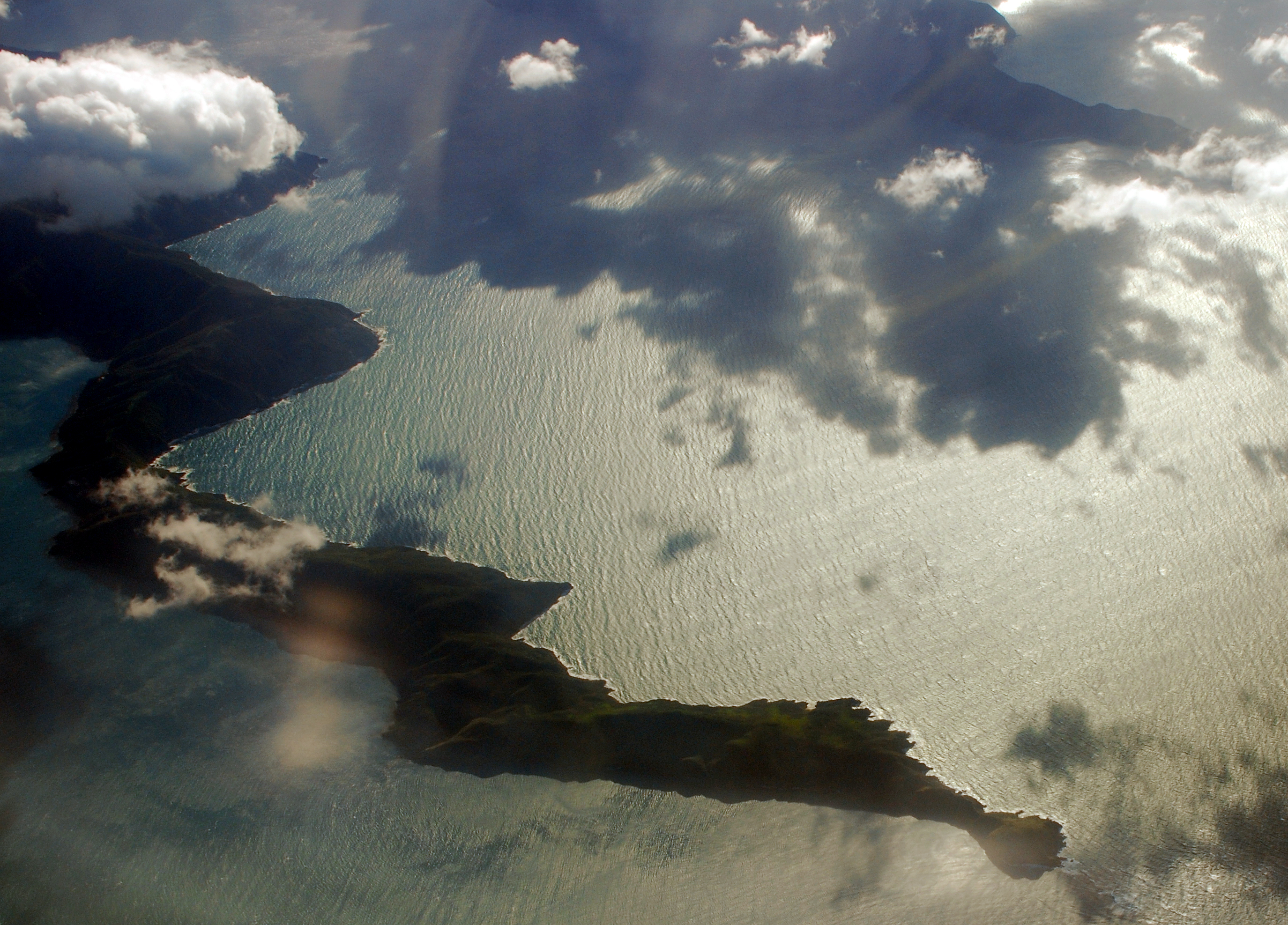
- Cape Jackson, Marlborough, New Zealand

- Coordinates: 40.9966°S 174.3134°E
- Location: Marlborough Sounds, Aotearoa New Zealand
- Etymology: Named for Sir George Jackson. Māori name translates as 'the large spear of Kupe'

Cape Jackson (Māori: Te Taonui-a-Kupe) is a peninsula in Marlborough, in the South Island of New Zealand. It lies between Queen Charlotte Sound / Tōtaranui and Cook Strait.

Cape Jackson's history involves gold mining, sheep farming, and more recently carbon farming (growing trees for carbon sequestration purposes).

Cape Jackson is privately owned. The land is reserved as a private wilderness park known as Queen Charlotte Wilderness Park, and is available to the public via arrangement with the owners.

The cliffs on Cape Jackson are known as Te Kupenga-a-Kupe, 'the fishing net of Kupe', named for their resemblance to nets being hung out to dry. According to legend Kupe left a fishing net here.

Major efforts are underway to regenerate the native bush which once covered the six square kilometres (1,500 acres) of the peninsula.

== Naming ==
Cape Jackson was named by James Cook on 29 March 1770, after Sir George Jackson, one of the Admiralty secretaries and a friend and patron of Cook.

Te Taonui-a-Kupe is the Māori name for the point, literally 'the large spear of Kupe', the legendary polynesian explorer.
