= John Purling =

John Purling (1727–1800) was an East India Company commander and director, art collector and politician, who sat in the House of Commons between 1770 and 1790.

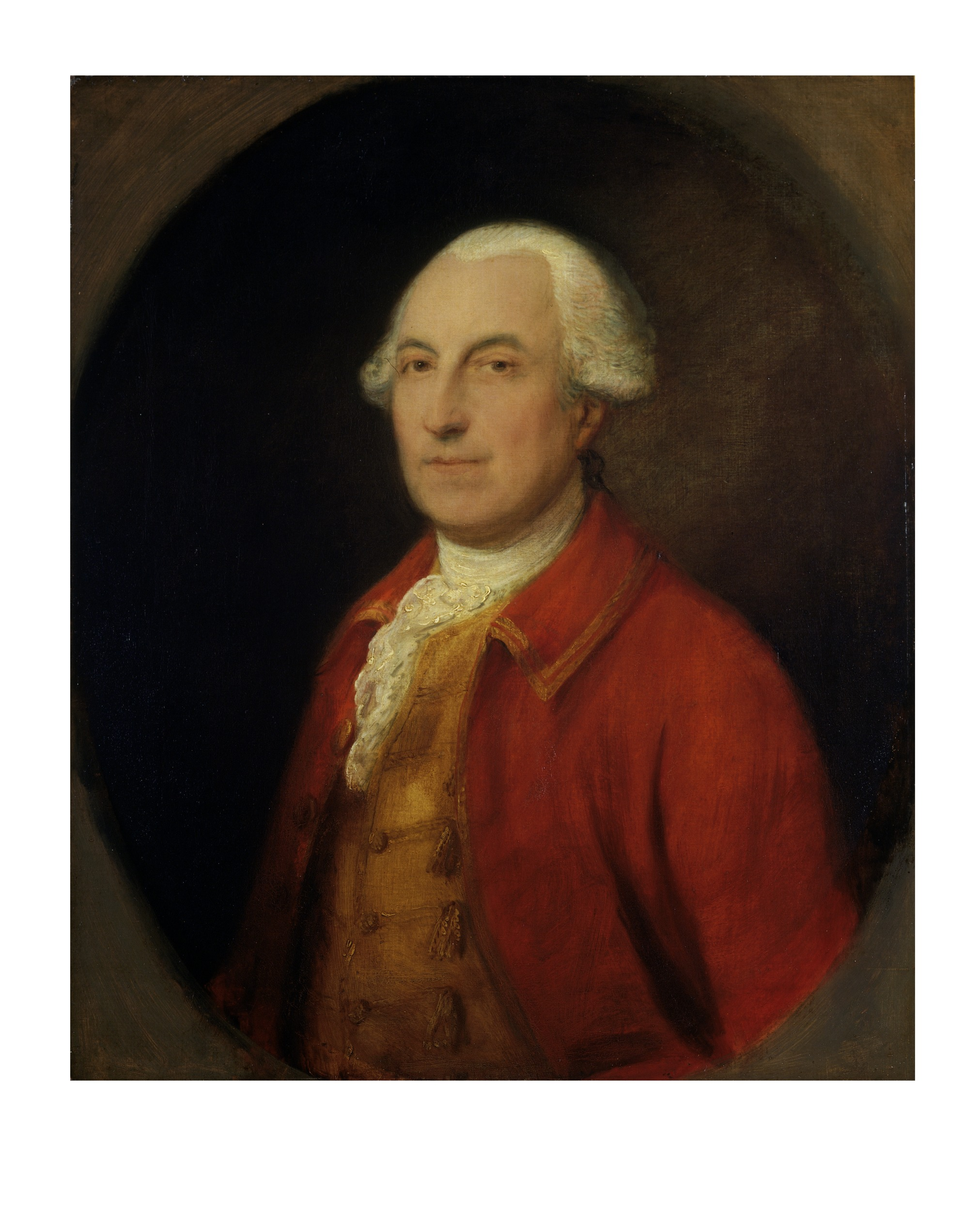
John Purling, painted in the 1770s by Thomas Gainsborough

Purling was born on the island of St Helena on 27 January 1727, the youngest of three sons of John Purling and his wife Elizabeth Bazett. A Mr or Captain John Purling was allowed by the East India Company to travel to St Helena in 1750 at his own expense, where in March 1751, described as a merchant of the City of London, he received from his brother Matthew the sum of £1,158 0s 0d for "a hundred and ten acres and a half of freehold, sixty-two acres and a half of leasehold, houses, two dwellings at the Fort in Chapel Valley, and his whole share of the personal estate of their father, mother and brother", identified as "the complete transfer of [his] inheritance on the island", and also the largest transaction in St Helena currency of the 1750s.

At some point Purling entered the company's shipping service, in which he rose to be commander of the Indiaman Sandwich from 1753 to 1759, and Neptune from 1760 to 1762. Following his last highly profitable China voyage he resigned the service, and in April 1763 was elected a director of the Company.

In 1770, Purling became deputy chairman of the East India Company and purchased the estate of Bradford Peverell in Dorset. Also in 1770 he stood in a by-election at New Shoreham in opposition to two other members of the East Indian Company, Thomas Rumbold and William James. Although Purling came second on the poll he was declared elected Member of Parliament by the returning officer who was concerned at the level of bribery and corruption by other candidates. However he was unseated on petition. In 1771 he became chairman of the East India Company. In a by-election in 1772 he was returned unopposed as MP for East Looe on the interest of John Buller senior. In 1772 the East India Company ran into financial difficulties, and Purling as its chairman was criticized for misleading the proprietors about their position. Although the control of the company's affairs really rested with Sulivan and Sir George Colebrook and Purling's responsibility was largely nominal, he refused to stand for re-election as chairman in 1773. In a speech in Parliament on 23 March 1773, he welcomed parliamentary investigation into the company's affairs. In 1774 he took the lead in pressing for the compensation of East India commanders adversely affected by the shipping reforms resulting from the Regulating Act 1773. In 1774 he was returned unopposed for Weymouth and Melcombe Regis. He became a director of the EIC again in 1777 and remained until 1780. In 1780 he was returned for Weymouth unopposed. He was a member of the St. Alban's Tavern group, which tried to bring about a union between Pitt and Fox. He was returned unopposed for Weymouth again in 1784 but did not stand in 1790.

== Family ==
Purling married Nancy FitzHugh in 1755. Born in 1725, she was the daughter of William FitzHugh (1684-1730), who had himself been an East India Company captain, and his wife Mary Pyne. Nancy died on 19 April 1793. The two had no children.

Purling's brother Matthew (born 1720) married Frances Wrangham on Saint Helena in 1743, being described in the certificate of marriage as a "factor and planter". He was one of the governing council of the island from the 1740s to the 1760s, but re-located by 1767 to join John in London. Portraits of Matthew's youngest son George and youngest daughter Caroline, the latter painted by George Romney in the spring of 1778, were auctioned in October 2023. Purling's estate at Bradford Peverell passed to Matthew's son George Purling (died 1840), then Matthew's grandson John Charles Purling (died 1848), then Matthew's great-grandson Hastings Nathaniel Middleton (1809-1898). Matthew died in 1791.

Purling himself died on 23 August 1800, "in his 74th year". His will mentions property near Weymouth and Ramsay in Huntingdonshire, and also at St. Vincent in the West Indies. He built up a large collection of works of art by Raphael, Correggio, Carracci, Guido, Parmegiano, Claude, Titian, Tintoretto, S. Ricci, Domenichino, P. Veronese, P. Da Cortona, C. Maratti, Poussin, Murillo, Cuyp, Rubens, Teniers, Zuccarelli, Wilson, Wouvermans, P. Potter, Vanderwerff, Vandervelde, Berchem, Ferg and others. These were auctioned in 1801 after his death, at his residence at 68 Portland Place, as were the furniture and the property itself.

Parliament of Great Britain
Preceded by Peregrine Cust; Vice-Admiral (Sir) Samuel Cornish	Member of Parliament for New Shoreham; 1770; With: Peregrine Cust	Succeeded by Peregrine Cust; Thomas Rumbold
Preceded by Richard Leigh; John Buller	Member of Parliament for East Looe; 1772–1774; With: John Buller	Succeeded by Sir Charles Whitworth; John Buller
Preceded by The Lord Waltham; Sir Charles Davers; Jeremiah Dyson; John Tucker	Member of Parliament for Weymouth and Melcombe Regis; 1774–1790; With: Welbore Ellis 1774-1790; William Chaffin Grove 1774-1781; John Tucker 1774-1778; Gabriel Steward 1778-1781; Warren Lisle 1780; Gabriel Steward 1780-1786; William Richard Rumbold 1781-1784; Sir Thomas Rumbold 1784-1790; George Jackson 1786-1788; Gabriel Steward 1788-1790	Succeeded by Colonel Sir James Murray (Sir) Richard Bempde Johnstone; Andrew Stuart; Thomas Jones
