= Richard Glover (poet) =

English poet and politician (1712–1785)

Richard Glover (1712 – 25 November 1785) was an English poet and politician.

== Life ==
The son of Richard Glover, a Hamburg merchant, he was born in London and educated at Cheam in Surrey. His mother was a sister of Richard West, Lord Chancellor of Ireland. The young Richard was said to have been something of a favourite of his uncle.

In 1739 he became one of the founding governors for the Foundling Hospital, a charity dedicated to saving children from the plight of abandonment. The success of Glover's Leonidas led him to take an interest in politics, and in 1761 he entered parliament as member for Weymouth and Melcombe Regis. Glover was one of the reputed authors of the Letters of Junius; but his claims, advocated in 1825 by Richard Duppa, are slight.

== Works ==
He wrote in his sixteenth year a poem to the memory of Sir Isaac Newton, which was prefixed by Henry Pemberton to his View of Newton's Philosophy, published in 1728.

In 1737, he published an epic poem, Leonidas, which proved highly successful. It retells the story of the Battle of Thermopylae of 480 BC, drawing heavily on ancient accounts of Herodotus and Diodorus Siculus. It was commended by the prince of Wales and his court, and celebrated by leading literary figures such as Alexander Pope, Henry Fielding, and Jonathan Swift. Translations into German, French and Danish followed, as did several stage adaptions; and a number of writers across Europe, including Willem van Haren, Abbé Prévost, Gotthold Ephraim Lessing, Friedrich Gottlieb Klopstock and Friedrich Schiller cited and praised the poem.

In 1739, Glover published a poem entitled London, or the Progress of Commerce; and in 1740 he published a ballad, Admiral Hosier's Ghost, popular in its day. The ballad's real target was not the Spanish but Sir Robert Walpole.

He was also the author of two tragedies, Boadicea (1753) and Medea (1761), written in close imitation of Greek models. The Athenaid, an epic in thirty books, was published in 1787, and his diary, entitled Memoirs of a distinguished literary and political Character from 1742 to 1757, appeared in 1813.

In May 1774, shortly after the death of Oliver Goldsmith, Glover published his "Authentic Anecdotes" on the poet in The Universal Magazine. Edmund Burke included the piece in The Annual Register for that year, and when Edmond Malone in 1776 worked on a biographical memoir for Poems and Plays by Oliver Goldsmith (1777) he based it on Glover's Anecdotes as well as first-hand information from Dr. Thomas Wilson, Senior Fellow at Trinity College, Dublin.

Parliament of Great Britain
Preceded by Welbore Ellis; Lord John Cavendish; George Dodington; John Tucker	Member of Parliament for Weymouth and Melcombe Regis; 1761–1768 with John Tucker 1761–1768; Sir Francis Dashwood, 2nd Bt 1761–1763; The Lord Waltham 1761–1762; Richard Jackson 1762–1768; Charles Walcott 1763–1768	Succeeded by John Tucker; The Lord Waltham; Sir Charles Davers, 6th Bt; Jeremiah Dyson
