= Rumwold =

Rumwold (sometimes Rumbold) is an Old English name used to refer to:

- Rumwold of Buckingham, infant saint commemorated at Buckingham
- Rumbold of Mechelen, saint commemorated at Mechelen

== See also ==
- Rumbold (disambiguation)
