= Sir George Duckett, 2nd Baronet =

British landowner and politician

Sir George Duckett, 2nd Baronet (17 July 1777 – 15 June 1856) was a British landowner and politician.

== Biography ==
He was born George Jackson, the only surviving son of George Jackson, who adopted the surname of Duckett on 3 February 1797. He was commissioned as a lieutenant in the West Essex militia in 1797, and was promoted to captain in 1798, major in 1804 and lieutenant-colonel in 1805. In 1807 he was elected Member of Parliament for Lymington, replacing his brother-in-law Sir Harry Burrard Neale. In 1812 he was returned for Plympton Erle, but he retired later the same year. On 15 December 1822 he succeeded to his father's baronetcy. His inheritance included the tolls on the Stort Navigation, but he invested poorly, as a partner in the bank of Duckett, Morland and Co., and in the unsuccessful Hertford Union Canal. He sold the family estate of Hartham House in 1825 and was declared bankrupt in 1832. On his death he was succeeded in the title by his only son George Floyd Duckett.

Baronetage of Great Britain
Preceded by George Duckett	Baronet (of Hartham House); 1822–1856	Succeeded by George Floyd Duckett
