= Gabriel Steward =

British politician and East India Company official

Gabriel Steward (April 1731–9 January 1792) was an East India Company official and politician who sat in the House of Commons between 1778 and 1790.

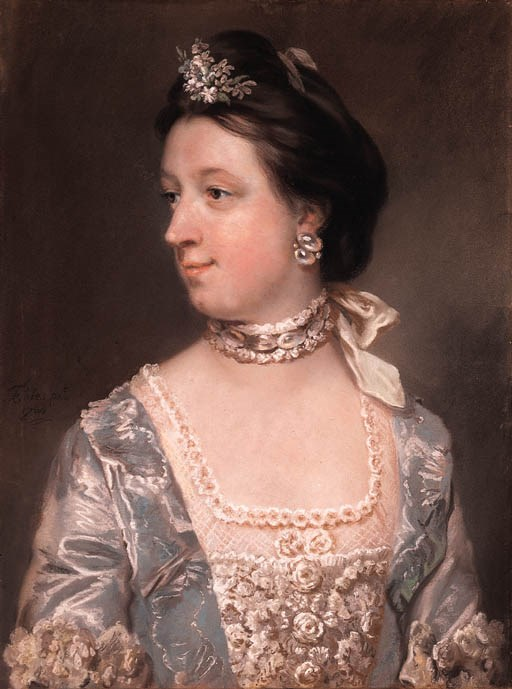
Rebecca Tucker, pastel by Francis Cotes, 1764.

Steward was the son of Gabriel Steward and his wife Sarah Wrangham. His family was from Scotland and lived at St. Helena in the early part of the eighteenth century. Later they settled at Weymouth. He served the East India Company for fifteen years in India in several positions, some of considerable rank. He married Rebecca Tucker, daughter of Richard Tucker of Weymouth before 1766.

Steward was returned as Member of Parliament for Weymouth and Melcombe Regis in a by-election in 1778 to replace his wife’s uncle John Tucker. Tucker also controlled three seats at Weymouth and when he died on 9 October 1779, control of the seats passed to Steward. He also succeeded to Tucker’s post of paymaster of the marines, which he kept by placing his parliamentary interest at the Treasury’s disposal and by voting regularly with each successive Administration. He was mayor of Weymouth in 1780 and being returning officer when Parliament was dissolved unexpectedly, he was ineligible to stand in the 1780 general election. Instead he returned Warren Lisle, an elderly relation of his wife, who resigned when Steward’s term of office finished. Steward’s election expenses in the by-election of £500 seem to have been paid by the Treasury. He was returned again at Weymouth in 1784. In 1786 he vacated his seat to accommodate an Administration candidate, George Jackson. Jackson resigned in order to contest Colchester in 1788 and Steward returned himself, staying until the 1790 general election

Steward died on 9 January 1792, aged 60.

Parliament of Great Britain
Preceded by Welbore Ellis; William Chaffin Grove; John Purling; John Tucker	Member of Parliament for Weymouth and Melcombe Regis; 1778–1780; With: Welbore Ellis; William Chaffin Grove; John Purling	Succeeded by Welbore Ellis; William Chaffin Grove; John Purling; Warren Lisle
Preceded by Welbore Ellis; William Chaffin Grove; John Purling; Warren Lisle	Member of Parliament for Weymouth and Melcombe Regis; 1780 – 1786; With: Welbore Ellis 1780-1786; William Chaffin Grove 1780-1781; John Purling 1780-1786; William Richard Rumbold 1781-1784; Sir Thomas Rumbold 1784-1786	Succeeded by Welbore Ellis; Sir Thomas Rumbold; John Purling; George Jackson
Preceded by Welbore Ellis; Sir Thomas Rumbold; John Purling; George Jackson	Member of Parliament for Weymouth and Melcombe Regis; 1788– 1790; With: Welbore Ellis; Sir Thomas Rumbold; John Purling	Succeeded by Colonel Sir James Murray (Sir) Richard Bempde Johnstone; Andrew Stuart; Thomas Jones
