= William Chaffin Grove =

English lawyer and politician

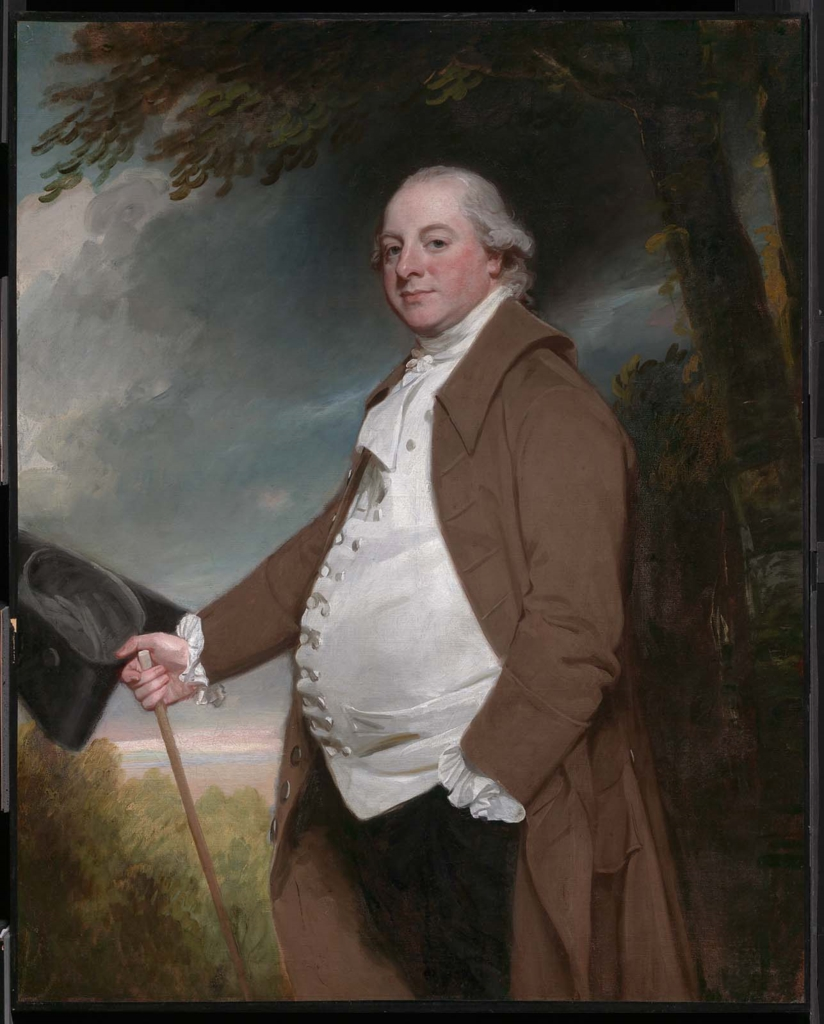
William Chafyn Grove (1731–1793). Portrait by George Romney, 1780.

William Chaffin (Chafin or Chafyn) Grove (c. 1731–1793) was an English lawyer and politician who sat in the House of Commons from 1768 to 1781.

Grove was the son of Chafin Grove of Zeals, Wiltshire and his wife Ann Amor. He was educated at Sutton and was admitted at St John's College, Cambridge on 30 April 1750, aged 18. He entered Middle Temple in 1750 and was called to the bar in 1756.

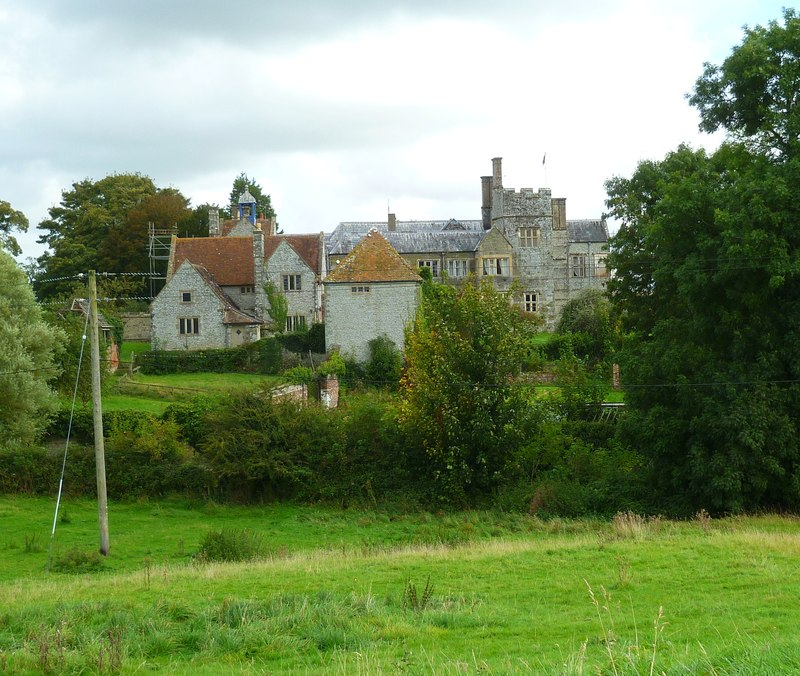
Zeals House from the West

Grove was returned as Member of Parliament for Shaftesbury in the 1768 general election after a contest. In Parliament he voted consistently with the Opposition. He was appointed Deputy Lieutenant for Dorset and Poole in 1769. In the 1774 election he decided not to contest Shaftesbury on account of the cost, but he had some property at Weymouth and was returned unopposed as MP for Weymouth and Melcombe Regis. He also became Recorder at Weymouth in 1774 and held the position until 1786.

The English Chronicle wrote of him in 1780: "An invariable and inveterate advocate for Administration, but not distinguished in any particular degree for any other quality either good or bad". He was returned again for Weymouth and Melcombe Regis in the general election of 1780 but resigned his seat in April 1781. He was High Sheriff of Wiltshire in 1784–85.

He married his distant cousin, Elizabeth Grove, daughter of John Grove of Ferne House near Shaftesbury on 7 October 1776. He died on 27 January 1793, aged 62.

Parliament of Great Britain
Preceded by Sir Gilbert Heathcote; Samuel Touchet	Member of Parliament for Shaftesbury; 1768–1774; With: (Sir) Ralph Payne 1768-1771; Francis Sykes 1771-1774	Succeeded by Thomas Rumbold; Francis Sykes
Preceded by The Lord Waltham; Sir Charles Davers; Jeremiah Dyson; John Tucker	Member of Parliament for Weymouth And Melcombe Regis; 1774–1781; With: Welbore Ellis 1774-1781; John Purling 1774-1781; John Tucker 1774-1778; Gabriel Steward 1778-1781; Warren Lisle 1780; Gabriel Steward 1780-1781	Succeeded by Welbore Ellis; William Richard Rumbold; John Purling; Gabriel Steward
