= John Whitehill (governor) =

18th Century East India Company's Officer

Governor of Madras
- In office 31 August 1777 – 8 February 1778 (Acting)
- Preceded by: George Stratton
- Succeeded by: Sir Thomas Rumbold
- In office 6 April 1780 – 8 November 1780 (Acting)
- Preceded by: Sir Thomas Rumbold
- Succeeded by: Charles Smith (acting)

Personal details
- Born: 30 November 1735 Bombay
- Died: 15 April 1812 (aged 76) Paris

John Whitehill (30 November 1735 – 15 April 1812) was an East India Company officer who was twice as Governor of Madras on a temporary basis in 1777 and 1780.

Whitehill was the son of Charles and Elizabeth Whitehill of Bombay, and was born in Bombay on 30 November 1735. He entered the service of the East India Company as a writer on 3 August 1752. In his early years he was involved in various actions, some more to his credit than others. In 1755 he was visiting King Alompra in Rangoon who was at war with the Pegu people. Whitehill saw some advantages in siding with his enemies and within two days was helping bombard the city in which he had just been a guest. Two years later he visited Rangoon again, was arrested and had his ship and cargo confiscated. His life was spared by the King. In 1761 he was involved in the administration of Pondicherry after it was captured from the French. He grew rich in the years following. In 1768 he became a senior merchant and member of the council of the governor. In 1769 he applied to the government for land on which to build a country house.

In 1773 Whitehill was chief at Masulipatam a responsible and challenging post. It was in that year that his niece Eliza Draper took refuge with him after absconding from an unfaithful husband. Eliza was daughter of his sister Judith who had died in about 1748. She attained celebrity as the muse of Laurence Sterne and was his subject in Journal to Eliza. Eliza's letters provide a description of Whitehill, and his mode of living. He was extremely generous to his friends, but this was to buy their attention and appreciation, and he was extremely jealous should they show preference to anyone else. His closest friend was Mr Sulivan, a sweet character and mild yet manly. She wrote "My uncle dotes on him with all the extravagences of violent passion. He cannot live without him. He cannot even bear him out of his sight. He cannot like to have him sleep in any apartment but his own." Despite her initial enthusiasm for her uncle, by the end of 1774 she was back in England.

Whitehill returned to England at the end of 1776 and was staying with his father at Worfield. Shropshire. While he was in England there was a coup d'état in Madras. Lord Pigot had been governor at Fort St George from 1755 to 1762 when he had been demonstrably autocratic and was appointed Governor of Madras again in 1775. He caused anger by announcing the restoration of the Raja of Tanjore, in direct contravention of a previous treaty which favoured the Nawab of Arcot. As the council were committed to the Nawab a violent dispute arose. Pigot tried to suspend the council, but the council in return arrested and imprisoned Pigot. George Stratton and Sir Robert Fletcher were leaders in the dispute and Stratton took over as Governor pending instructions from London. In the meantime Pigot died in prison.

The Directors of the East India Company were keen reassert their authority as soon as possible, and Whitehill was sent out to India in the middle of June. On his arrival after 79 days, he became acting governor on 31 August 1777 and the leaders of the revolt were recalled to London.

Sir Thomas Rumbold who was a senior councillor was nominated as the permanent governor and was sent out in due course. Whitehill handed over the governorship to Rumbold on 8 February 1778. Rumbold became ill in 1780 and returned to England. Whitehill again took over as governor on 6 April 1780. He soon found himself in a difficult situation because Runbold had been negligent with regard to security and Hyder Ali, the Sultan of the Kingdom of Mysore, launched the Second Anglo-Mysore War. The army Hyder assembled was one of the largest seen in southern India, estimated to number 83,000. Carefully co-ordinating the actions of his subordinate commanders, Hyder Ali swept down the Eastern Ghats onto the coastal plain in July 1780, laying waste the countryside. Due to Hyder Ali's secrecy and poor British intelligence, officials in Madras were unaware of his movements until the fires of burning villages just 9 miles (14 km) became visible in Madras. Hyder Ali himself organised the Siege of Arcot, while detaching his son Karim Khan Sahib to take Porto Novo. The movement in August of Sir Hector Munro with a force of over 5,000 from Madras to Kanchipuram (Conjeevaram) prompted Hyder Ali to lift the siege of Arcot and move to confront Munro. Word then arrived that Munro was awaiting the arrival of reinforcements from Guntur under Colonel William Baillie, so he sent a detachment under Tipu to intercept them, and eventually followed in strength himself, when Munro sent a force from his army to meet Baillie. Tipu and Hyder Ali surrounded Baillie's force, and compelled the surrender of about 3,000 men in the Battle of Pollilur on 10 September; it was the worst defeat of British troops in India to date. Hyder Ali then renewed the siege of Arcot, which fell in November. Whitehill was suspended and handed over the governorship to Charles Smith on 8 November 1780. He was then dismissed from the council of Madras and the service of the East India Company.

Whitehill died in Paris on the Rue de Vaugirard in 1812.

Political offices
Preceded by George Stratton	Governor of Madras; 1777–1778	Succeeded by Sir Thomas Rumbold
Preceded by Sir Thomas Rumbold	Governor of Madras; 1780–17780	Succeeded by Charles Smith
