= William Richard Rumbold =

English politician and member of parliament

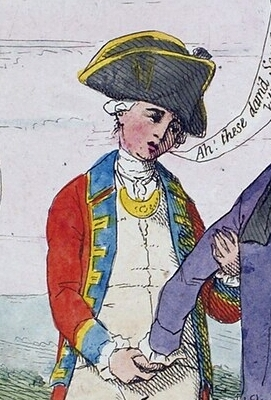

Member of Parliament for Weymouth and Melcombe Regis
- In office 30 April 1781 – 1784 Serving with Welbore Ellis, John Purling and Gabriel Steward
- Preceded by: William Chaffin Grove
- Succeeded by: Thomas Rumbold

Personal details
- Born: 1 March 1760
- Died: 14 June 1786 (aged 26)
- Party: Whig
- Education: Harrow School

William Richard Rumbold (1 March 1760 – 14 June 1786) was an English politician who was Member of Parliament for Weymouth and Melcombe Regis from 1781 to 1784.

== Life and career ==
Rumbold was the son of Governor of Madras Thomas Rumbold. His brothers George Rumbold was an ambassador and his brother Charles Rumbold was a fellow MP. Rumbold came to India in 1778 and became a Aide-de-Camp to Sir Hector Munro. He held the rank of Captain in the 1st Foot Guards and fought in the Siege of Pondicherry in October 1778. His father was sent back to England for enquiry on misconduct and illegal acquisition of wealth. When he became a member of Parliament for Weymouth, he supported his father and sought the downfall of Lord North. Both he and his father failed to obtain a seat for Shaftesbury.
