= Rumbolt =

Rumbolt is a surname. Notable people with this surname include:

- Allan Rumbolt, Canadian politician in Nunavut
- Courtney Rumbolt (born 1969), British bobsledder and Olympian

== See also ==
- Rumbold
