= Duckett baronets =

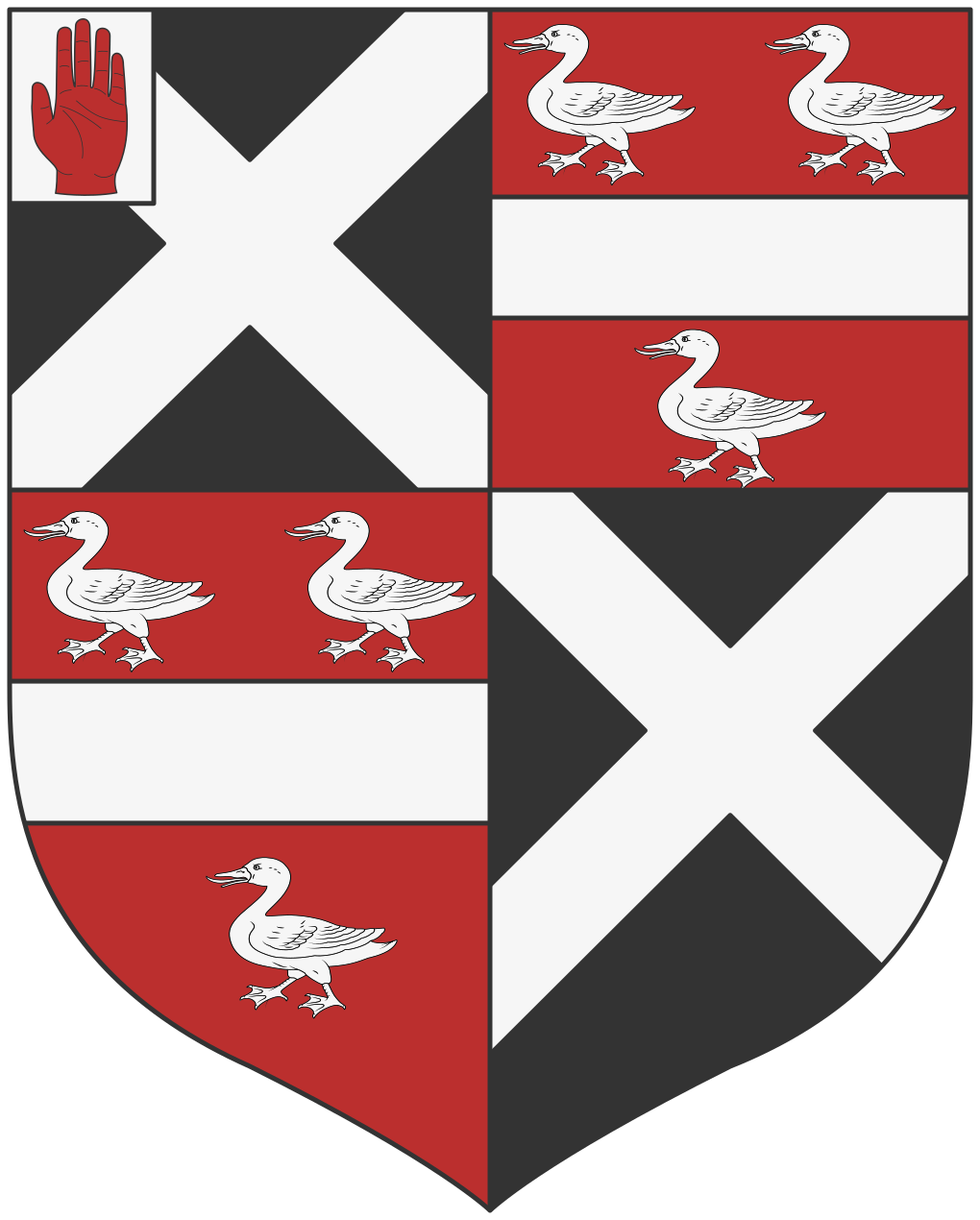
The coat of arms of Duckett of Hartham House, Baronets.

The Jackson, later Duckett baronetcy, of Hartham House in the County of Wiltshire, was a title in the Baronetage of Great Britain. It was created on 21 June 1791 for the naval administrator and politician George Jackson. He sat in Parliament for Weymouth from 1786 to 1788, and then Colchester from 1788 (removed on petition in 1789), and 1790 to 1796. He married as his second wife Grace Duckett, daughter of George Duckett, a landowner seated at Hartham; and 1797 he assumed by Royal licence the surname of Duckett in lieu of Jackson according to the will of Grace's uncle, Thomas Duckett.

He was succeeded by his son by his second wife, the 2nd Baronet, who represented Lymington and Plympton Erle in Parliament. The title became extinct on the death of the 3rd Baronet in 1902, an army officer, antiquarian and lexicographer.

== Jackson, later Duckett baronets, of Hartham House (1791) ==
- Sir George Duckett, 1st Baronet (1725–1822)
- Sir George Duckett, 2nd Baronet (1777–1856)
- Sir George Floyd Duckett, 3rd Baronet (1811–1902

Baronetage of Great Britain
Preceded by Call baronets	Jackson baronets of Hartham House; 28 July 1791	Succeeded by Woodford baronets
