= Thomas Rumbold =

British politician

Sir Thomas Rumbold Bt
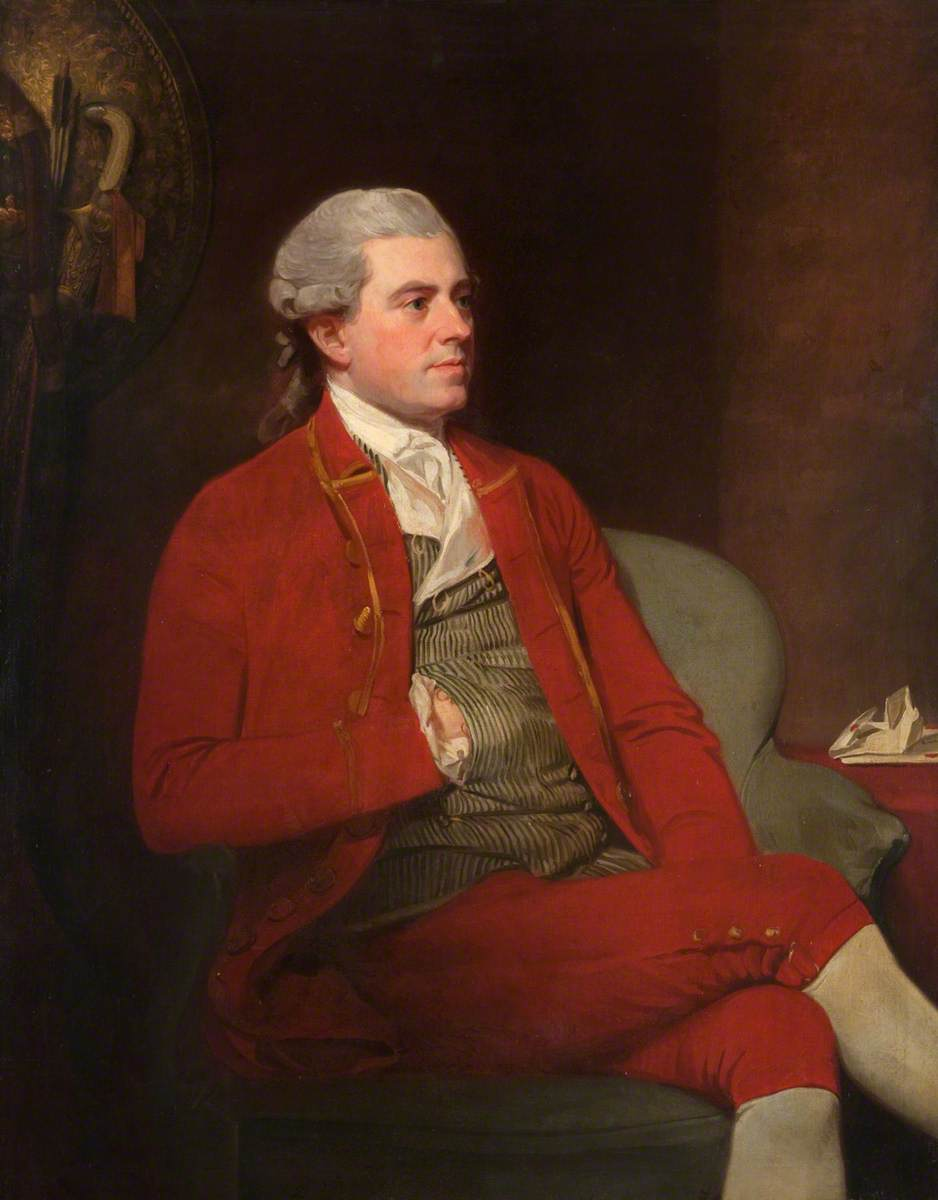
- painting by George Romney, 1777

Governor of Madras
- In office 8 February 1778 – 6 April 1780
- Preceded by: John Whitehill
- Succeeded by: John Whitehill

Personal details
- Spouse: Joanna Law (daughter of Edmund Law the Bishop of Carlisle)

Sir Thomas Rumbold, 1st Baronet (15 January 1736 – 11 November 1791) was a British administrator in India and politician who sat in the House of Commons between 1770 and 1790. He served as Governor of Madras from 1777 to 1780. He became infamous for his corruption and, for in effect stealing, the ring of the Nawab of Arcot. He brought home from India 1.5 million pagodas (a pagoda was worth eight shillings) or about £600,000 (at that time) and was a classic example of a nabob. Attempts were made to investigate the misdemeanour by Henry Dundas but the case did not make much headway.

== Life ==
Rumbold was the third son of William Rumbold, an officer of the East India Company's naval service. He joined the company's service as a writer at the age of 16, then transferred to the company's military service. Promoted to captain in 1757, he served as Clive's aide-de-camp at the Battle of Plassey. He subsequently transferred back to the Civil Service, becoming chief at Patna in 1763 and a member of the Bengal Council from 1766 to 1769; he was mentioned as a possible Governor of Bengal in 1771, but Warren Hastings was appointed.

In 1769 Rumbold returned to Britain with a large fortune, knowing the importance of parliamentary influence in the internal politics of the East India Company. He was elected to Parliament in 1770, initially as MP for New Shoreham, a notoriously corrupt and expensive borough where he probably bribed extensively. He received the majority of the votes, but so many were disallowed by the returning officer on grounds of bribery that he was defeated; however, on petition the result was overturned and Rumbold declared duly elected. Initially he voted with the opposition but by 1773 had joined his former commander, Clive, in supporting the government and its conduct of Indian affairs.

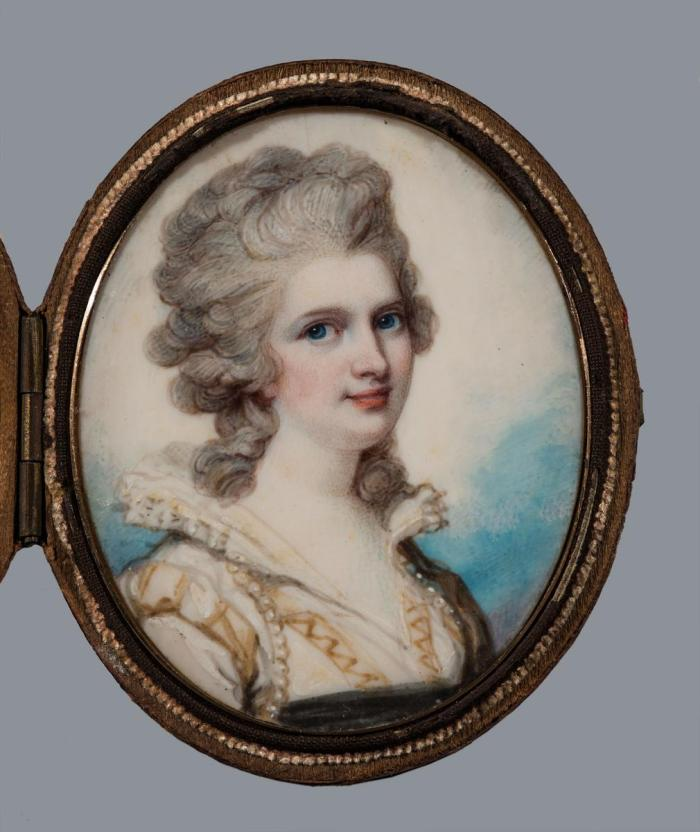
Rumbold married Joanna Law in 1772. Portrait attributed to Richard Cosway

At the next election, in 1774, Rumbold was embroiled in another election-bribery scandal at Shaftesbury: he and Sir Francis Sykes were initially declared elected, but their defeated opponent petitioned to have the result overturned and produced copious evidence of corruption. Rumbold and Sykes were both shown to have bribed at a rate of 20 guineas (£21) a man, the total spent amounting to several thousand pounds. The Commons Committee not only overturned the election result, but ordered that Sykes, Rumbold, and a long list of other inhabitants of the town should be prosecuted by the Attorney General for bribery and perjury. However, the prosecution never took place, and the Commons was eventually persuaded to reverse its condemnations of Sykes and Rumbold so that both were able to stand for the same borough at the next general election, in 1780.

In the meanwhile, Rumbold continued his career in India. He had been a director of the East India Company in 1772 and again from 1775 to 1777, and in June 1777 he was appointed Governor of Madras. During his governorship, British troops occupied Guntur (then French), which shortly afterwards was annexed to Madras, and also captured Pondichéry and Mahé; reporting the capture of Pondicherry to Lord North in October 1778 he declared that he had "happiness to succeed in fulfilling the wishes of his Majesty's ministers", and asked for a suitable reward. He was created first baronet of Wood Hall (referring to Woodhall Park, his Hertfordshire estate) on 27 March 1779.

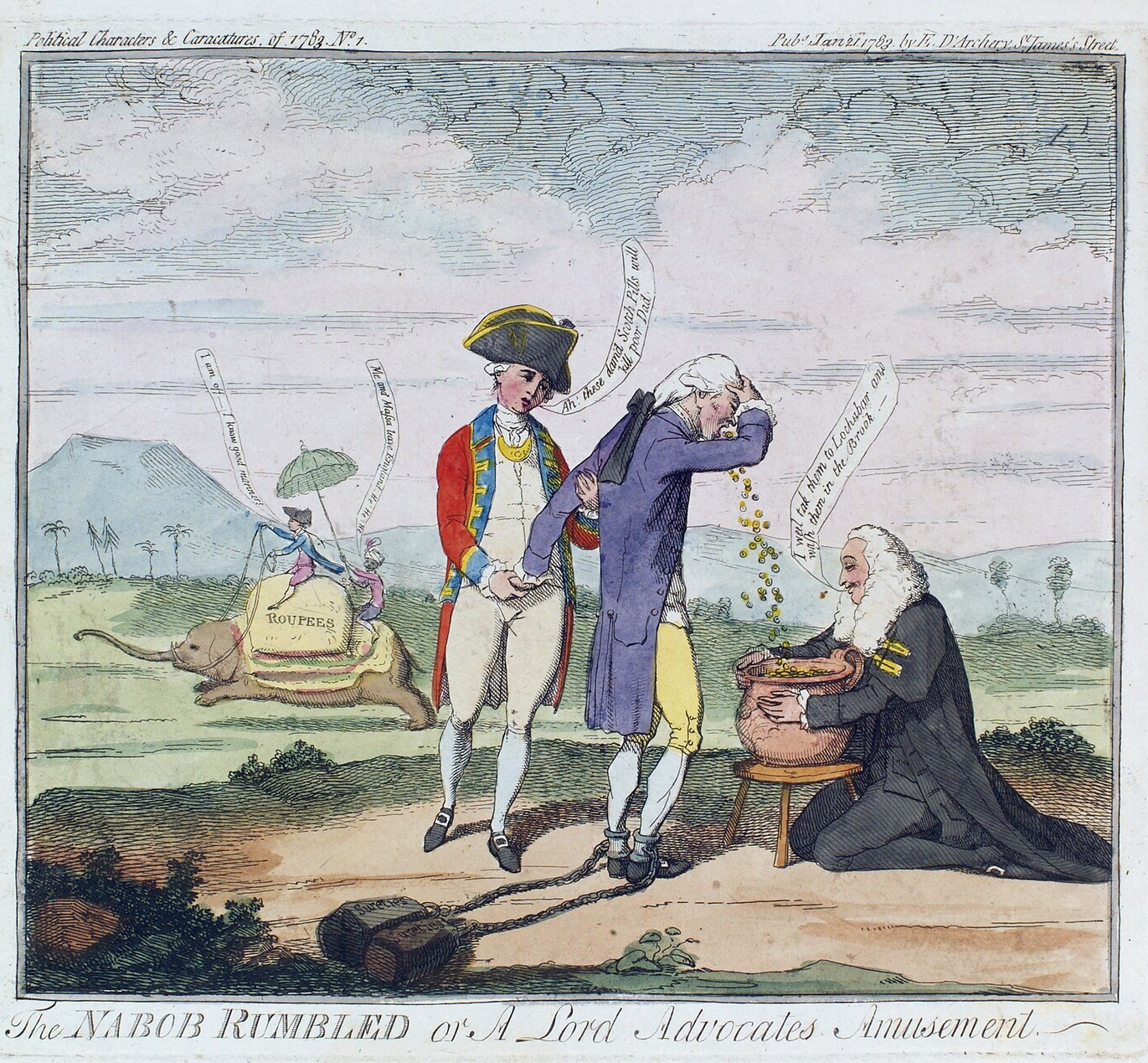
Cartoon depicting Thomas Rumbold ("Nabob Rumbled") bribing Henry Dundas

However, Sir Thomas was also responsible for negotiations with Haidar Ali, and was unable to dissuade him from invading the Carnatic or to prevent him from succeeding. He resigned the governorship for reasons of ill health in 1780, and was subsequently dismissed from the service of the company by the court of directors, who held him responsible for the Carnatic invasion and the Second Anglo-Mysore War. A parliamentary enquiry was also imminent, and he was anxious to be in the Commons to defend himself, but he had once more been unseated for electoral corruption (having won the 1780 election at Shaftesbury in his absence the result had been overturned again), and had to buy himself a seat at Yarmouth (Isle of Wight). (While bribing voters was illegal, paying the patron of a pocket borough for a nomination as MP was still legal at this period.)

Rumbold supported the establishment of a parliamentary committee of enquiry into the causes of the war in the Carnatic, and spoke repeatedly during the debates that followed. However, the committee did not call him to give evidence, and eventually passed a motion for his impeachment. He was alleged to have diverted a staggering £600,000 into his own pockets, and it was proved that he had been consistently remitting back to England sums three times as big as his salary. But Rumbold's defence was vigorous, no useful evidence to back the charges against him was forthcoming from India, and he was acquitted. Nevertheless, it seems to have been widely believed that he had bribed Henry Dundas and Richard Rigby, the members in charge of the proceedings against him. The story obviously cannot be proved and perhaps ought not to be taken seriously.

Rumbold continued as an MP until 1790, and died the following year.

== Legacy ==
Rumbold was buried at Watton-at-Stone, where there is a monument to him in the parish church.

Rumbold was painted by:

- Gainsborough. "Thomas Rumbold and his Son": Victoria Art Gallery.
- Reynolds. Art Institute of Chicago.
- Romney (a portrait in the Hunterian Art Gallery),

=== Descendants ===
His oldest son, William Richard Rumbold having pre-deceased him, he was succeeded as baronet by his son George, a diplomat. Another son, Charles, served as MP for Great Yarmouth. His daughter Elizabeth Anne attempted to restore the reputation of her father in a book published posthumously in 1868.

== Bibliography ==
- Dutt, Romesh (1950). The Economic History of India under Early British rule, from the Rise of the British Power in 1757 to the Accession of Queen Victoria in 1837 (7th ed.). London: Routledge & Kegan Paul.
- Concise Dictionary of National Biography. 1930.
- Namier, Lewis; Brooke, John (1964). "Sir Thomas Rumbold, 1st baronet". The History of Parliament: The House of Commons 1754-1790. London: HMSO.
- T. H. B. Oldfield (1816). The Representative History of Great Britain and Ireland. London: Baldwin, Cradock & Joy.
- Leigh Rayment's list of baronets

Parliament of Great Britain
Preceded by Peregrine Cust; John Purling	Member of Parliament for New Shoreham; 1770–1774; With: Peregrine Cust	Succeeded by Charles Goring; Sir John Shelley
Preceded by William Chaffin Grove; Francis Sykes	Member of Parliament for Shaftesbury; 1774–1775; With: Sir Francis Sykes	Succeeded by Hans Winthrop Mortimer; George Rous
Preceded by Hans Winthrop Mortimer; George Rous	Member of Parliament for Shaftesbury; 1780–1781; With: Sir Francis Sykes	Succeeded by Hans Winthrop Mortimer; Sir Francis Sykes
Preceded by Edward Morant; Edward Rushworth	Member of Parliament for Yarmouth (Isle of Wight); 1781–1784; With: Edward Morant	Succeeded by Edward Morant; Philip Francis
Preceded by Welbore Ellis; John Purling; Gabriel Steward; William Richard Rumbold	Member of Parliament for Weymouth and Melcombe Regis; 1784–1790; With: Welbore Ellis; John Purling; Gabriel Steward 1784–1786; George Jackson 1786–1788; Gabriel Steward 1788–1790	Succeeded by Sir James Murray Pulteney; Richard Bempde Johnstone; Andrew Stuart; Thomas Jones
Political offices
Preceded by John Whitehill	Governor of Madras; 1778–1780	Succeeded by John Whitehill
Baronetage of Great Britain
New creation	Baronet (of Woodhall); 1779–1791	Succeeded by George Berriman Rumbold
