= Arthur Carlos Henry Rumbold =

Sir Arthur Carlos Henry Rumbold Bt
- Born: 25 September 1820
- Died: 12 June 1869 (aged 48); Tortola, British Virgin Islands
- Education: Sandhurst
- Occupations: Soldier, colonial administrator
- Spouse(s): Antoinette de Kerven (1846–1867, her death); Helen Eliza Hopewell (1868–1869 his death)
- Children: Sir Arthur Victor Raoul Anduze Rumbold, 6th Baronet

Sir Arthur Carlos Henry Rumbold, 5th Baronet (25 September 1820 – 12 June 1869) was a British soldier and diplomat.

== Personal life ==
Arthur Rumbold was born to Sir William Rumbold, 3rd Baronet (1787–1833) and his wife, Henrietta Elizabeth Parkyns. He was younger brother to Sir Cavendish Stuart Rumbold, 4th Baronet.

He married twice. Firstly, to Antoinette de Kerven, in January 1846. She died on Tortola on 27 October 1867 shortly before a major hurricane hit the Territory. He then married, secondly, Helen Eliza Hopewell, on 18 August 1868.

He was educated at the Royal Military Academy Sandhurst.

== Career ==
Rumbold entered the army as an ensign at the age of 17 in 1837. He served in New South Wales and Tasmania with the 51st Foot. He then transferred to the 21st Fusiliers, where he served in Bengal, Mauritius and Cape of Good Hope. In 1844 he transferred again to 1st West India Regiment, but bought out his commission in 1846.

He then served as a stipendiary magistrate in Jamaica until 1855.

He then served in the Crimean War he served as brigade major. He was also appointed to the rank of Colonel in the Ottoman Army, and was invested with the Order of the Medjidie.

After the war he returned to the West Indies where he began his diplomatic career. He was appointed President of Nevis on 4 March 1857, and then President of the British Virgin Islands in October 1865. From January to April 1867 he also served as Administrator of Anguilla and St Kitts.

== Death ==
He died on 12 June 1869 and the baronetcy devolved to his son, Sir Arthur Victor Raoul Anduze Rumbold, 6th Baronet (1869–1877). His son died whilst still a child and the baronetcy then passed to the older Sir Arthur's brother (the younger Sir Arthur's uncle), Sir Charles Hale Rumbold, 7th Baronet.

== See also ==
- Rumbold baronets

Government offices
Preceded by Frederick Seymour	President of Nevis; 1857–1860	Succeeded by George Cavell Webbe
Preceded by James Robert Longden	President of the Virgin Islands; 1866–1869	Succeeded by Alexander Wilson Muir
Baronetage of Great Britain
Preceded by Cavendish Rumbold	Baronet (of Wood Hall); 1853–1869	Succeeded by Arthur Rumbold
