= Rumbold baronets =

Title in the Baronetage of Great Britain

The Rumbold Baronetcy, of Wood Hall in Watton in the County of Hertford, is a title in the Baronetage of Great Britain. It was created on 27 March 1779 for the politician and colonial administrator Thomas Rumbold. The second Baronet was Minister at Hamburg. The fifth Baronet was President of Nevis and of the Virgin Islands. The eighth Baronet was Ambassador to Austria from 1896 to 1900. The ninth Baronet was also a distinguished diplomat and served as Ambassador to Germany from 1928 to 1933. The tenth Baronet was Ambassador to Thailand and Austria.

== Rumbold baronets, of Wood Hall (1779) ==
Escutcheon of the Rumbold baronets of Wood Hall

- Sir Thomas Rumbold, 1st Baronet (1736–1791)
- Sir George Berriman Rumbold, 2nd Baronet (1764–1807)
- Sir William Rumbold, 3rd Baronet (1787–1833)
- Sir Cavendish Stuart Rumbold, 4th Baronet (1815–1853)
- Sir Arthur Carlos Henry Rumbold, 5th Baronet (brother of the 4th baronet; 1820–1869)
- Sir Arthur Victor Raoul Anduze Rumbold, 6th Baronet (son of the 5th baronet; 1869–1877)
- Sir Charles Hale Rumbold, 7th Baronet (brother of the 4th and 5th baronets; 1822–1877)
- Sir Horace Rumbold, 8th Baronet (brother of the 4th, 5th and 7th baronets; 1829–1913)
- Sir Horace George Montagu Rumbold, 9th Baronet (1869–1941)
- Sir (Horace) Anthony Claude Rumbold, 10th Baronet (1911–1983)
- Sir Henry John Sebastian Rumbold, 11th Baronet (born 1947)

The heir presumptive is Charles Anton Rumbold (born 1959), a kinsman of the present holder.

== Extended family ==
Sir (Horace) Algernon Fraser Rumbold (1906–1993), son of Colonel William Edwin Rumbold, second son of the eighth Baronet, was Deputy High Commissioner to South Africa from 1949 to 1953, Deputy Under-Secretary of State from 1958 to 1966 and author of Watershed in India 1914–1922.

== See also ==
- Rombouts

== Notes ==
Baronetage of Great Britain
| Preceded by Lippincott baronets | Rumbold baronets of Wood Hall; 27 March 1779 | Succeeded by Basset baronets |
