= Eliza Draper =

British writer

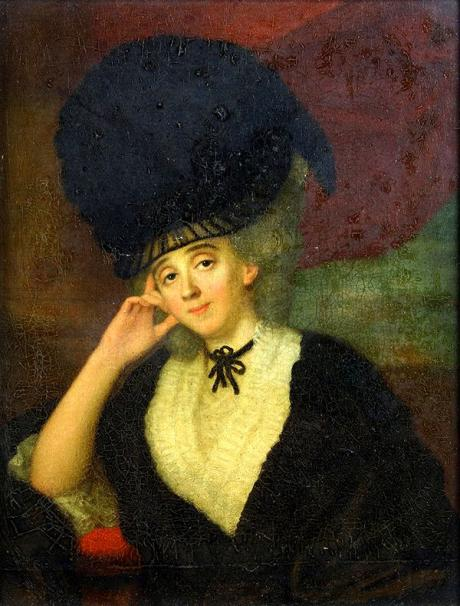
- by John Raphael Smith
- Born: 5 April 1744; Anchuthengu
- Died: 3 August 1778 (aged 34); Clifton, England

Eliza Draper (born Elizabeth Sclater; 5 April 1744 – 3 August 1778) was a British muse to novelist Laurence Sterne and is commemorated in his Sentimental Journey and Journal to Eliza. She had literary talents that were developed under Sterne's influence, and she wrote many letters from India, describing the life and customs there.

== Early life ==
Eliza was born Elizabeth Sclater at Anjengo, India, on 5 April 1744. She was the eldest daughter of May Sclater and his wife Judith Whitehill, daughter of Charles Whitehill. Her father was in the service of the East India Company. He died in 1746, and her mother probably by 1748. The three daughters then lived with their grandfather, Charles Whitehill, at Bombay. In 1754, the girls were sent to a boarding school in England, spending the holidays with their uncle and aunt, Thomas and Elizabeth Pickering. Eliza and her sisters returned to their grandfather in Bombay in 1757.

== Marriage ==
Eliza was married at the age of 14 to Daniel Draper (1726–1805), a son of William Henry Draper, on 27 July 1758. Her husband was a cousin of General Sir William Draper, who captured Manila. Eliza had two children, a son born in 1759, who died in England nine years later, and a daughter, Elizabeth, born in 1761. Her sister Mary married Rawson Hart Boddam and her sister Louise married Colonel Charles Pemble.

In 1765, the Drapers visited England, bringing their children home to be educated. When Daniel returned to Bombay in 1766, Eliza stayed in England. Early in 1767, when staying at the house in Soho of her friend, Mrs. James, wife of Commodore, afterwards Sir William James, she met the novelist Laurence Sterne.

== Laurence Sterne ==
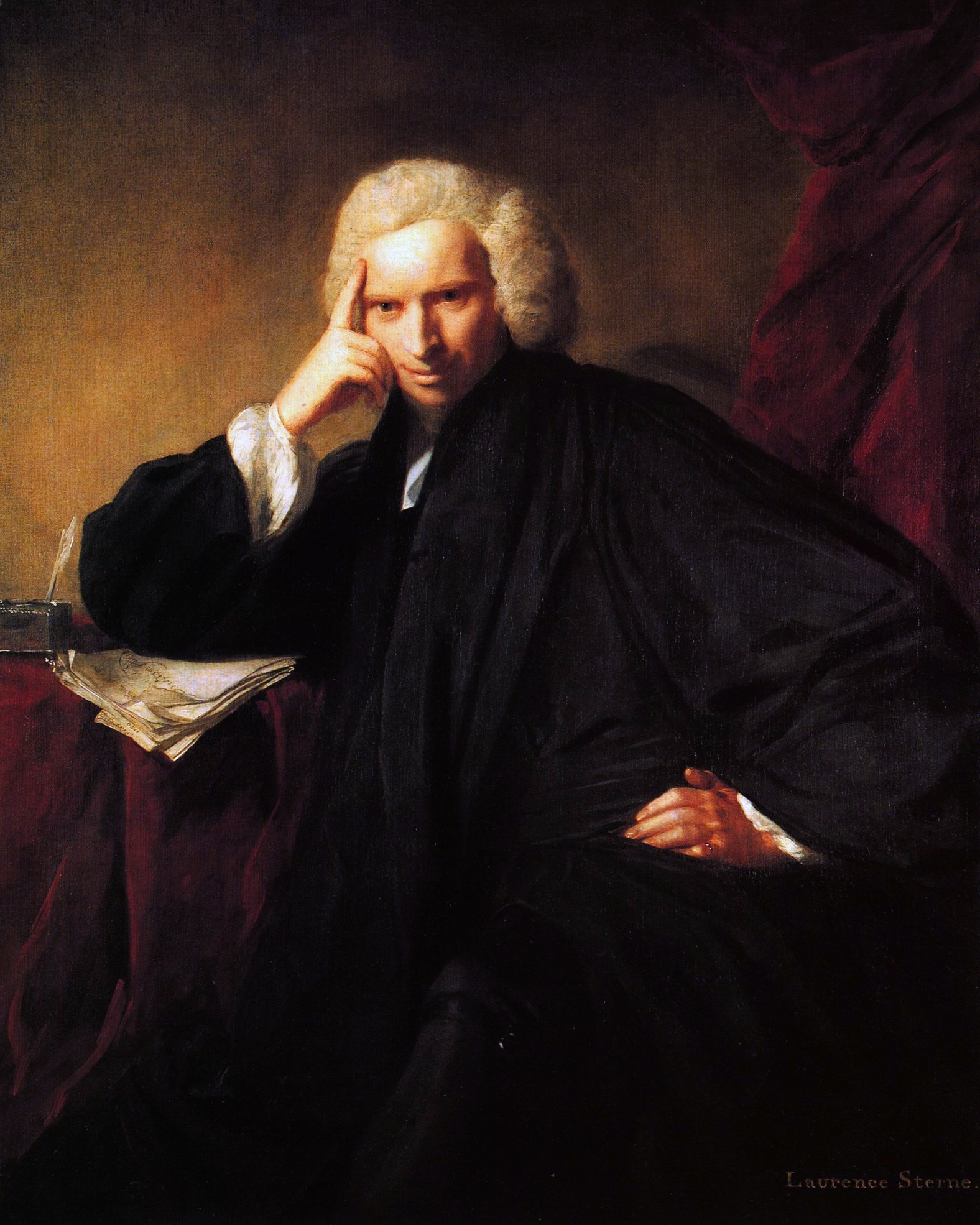
Portrait of Laurence Sterne by Joshua Reynolds, 1760

Sterne was quickly captivated by Eliza's charm, vivacity and intelligence. Her upbringing had not instilled discretion; her self-esteem was flattered, and she did little to discourage the attentions of such a celebrated man. They met frequently, exchanged miniature portraits, and Sterne's admiration seems to have turned into an obsession which he took no trouble to conceal. To his great distress Eliza had to return to India three months after their first meeting. After her departure, Sterne brought out his Sentimental Journey, which contains some extravagant references to her and, although their relationship was platonic, it aroused considerable interest. He also wrote his Journal to Eliza, part of which he sent to her, and the rest of which came to light when it was presented to the British Museum in 1894. Sterne died from consumption a year later without seeing her again. Sterne, calling himself Yorick, and addressing Eliza as Bramine, maintained a correspondence until Sterne's death. After Sterne's death, his letters were to be published. Eliza succeeded in suppressing her letters to him and allowed ten of his letters to be published under the title Letters from Yorick to Eliza.

== Marital breakdown ==
Eliza left her children in England with her grandfather, Charles Whitehill, who was now living in retirement at Worfield, Shropshire, and sailed to Bombay to join her husband. On the journey, her cabin companion was Hester Light, who was to marry George Stratton. Eliza's husband held the post of Accountant-General at Bombay. In the following year he was sent to Tellicherry as Chief of the Factory after a dispute with the new Governor Thomas Hodges, and she accompanied him. In 1770 they were transferred to Surat, returning to Bombay in 1772. Here Eliza and her husband became increasingly estranged. Besides keeping native women, he seduced Eliza's English maid. The final break came in January 1773 when, after discovering this, Eliza fled from his house and took refuge for a time on board HMS Prudent in the protection of the Commodore Sir John Clarke. She never saw her husband again. The marriage was not dissolved, and Eliza kept custody of her daughter.

== Independence ==
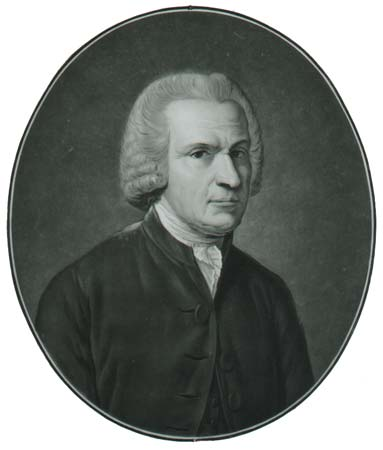
Guillaume Raynal

Eliza lived for a year in India with her uncle John Whitehill, then Chief at Masulipatnam and afterwards Governor of Madras. She was back in England in 1774 for her health. She was living at 3 Queen Anne Street, London, a street where many literary figures dwelled, and was joined by her sixteen-year-old daughter. Eliza became popular in literary society, being on friendly terms with John Wilkes among others. In 1778 she met and made a profound impression upon the Abbé Raynal. She provided him with much technical information for his Histoire des deux Indes, and he was clearly smitten by her. After her death, he wrote a fulsome tribute to her which began in translation "Territory of Anjengo, thou art nothing; but thou hast given birth to Eliza". He went on in such terms: "The men were wont to say, that no woman had so many graces as Eliza: the women said so too. They all praised her candour; they all extolled her sensibility; they were all ambitious of the honour of her acquaintance. The strings of envy were never pointed against unconscious merit".

== Later days and legacy ==
In May 1777 Eliza became seriously ill and in June 1778 she went to Bristol, where she may have stayed with her husband's kinsman, Sir William Draper. She died at Clifton on 3 August 1778 and was buried in Bristol Cathedral, where there is an elaborate monument by the sculptor John Bacon. The inscription reads:

"Sacred to the memory of Mrs. Eliza Draper in whom genius and benevolence were united; she died August 3rd. 1778, aged 34."

Eliza's daughter Elizabeth married Thomas Nevill, brother of Richard Nevill, MP of Furness, County Kildare on 1 October 1785. She had a son, Daniel Draper Nevill, and two daughters.

Daniel Draper remained in the service of the East India Company until 1782, when he retired to England and purchased an estate at Great Stanmore, Middlesex. He died on 20 March 1805 and was buried at Great Stanmore. He was a rich man and in his will, he left bequests, totalling over £100,000, to his grandchildren, nieces and others, including an illegitimate son. His executor was Rawson Hart Boddam, who had married Eliza's sister, Mary.

== Sources ==
- Sclater, William Lutley (1922). Sterne's Eliza; some account of her life in India: with her letters written between 1757 and 1774. London: W. Heinemann.
- Draper, Eliza (1797). Letters Written Between Yorick (pseud.) and Eliza (Draper.) 2. Ed. London: Sammer.
