= Timothy Collopy =

British painter

Timothy Collopy (fl. 1777–1810) was an Irish portrait painter.

== Life ==
Timothy Collopy was a native of Limerick where he began life as a baker's apprentice. His talent for sketching and painting having attracted the notice of Father Walsh, an Augustinian friar, a fund was subscribed for in Limerick by which Collopy was enabled to go to Rome to study art. There he remained some years.

On his return to Ireland he settled in his native city and there and in the neighbourhood was extensively patronised as a portrait painter. In 1777 and 1780 he was in Dublin and, from 112 Grafton Street, sent portraits to the exhibition of the Society of Artists in William Street.

Anxious to obtain a wider field for his talents he went to London in or before 1783 and sought employment as a portrait painter. Though he does not appear to have met with any great success he remained in London until his death, paying occasional visits to Limerick. He exhibited twice at the Royal Academy, in 1786 a Portrait group of a Lady, Gentleman and Child, and a sketch for The Crucifixion, an altar piece painted in Ireland which he had presented to St John's Chapel in Limerick and in 1788 a Portrait of Mr. Agar. He was also employed in cleaning the collection of pictures belonging to the Marquess of Bute in London.

He died in London about 1810 or 1811.

== Works ==
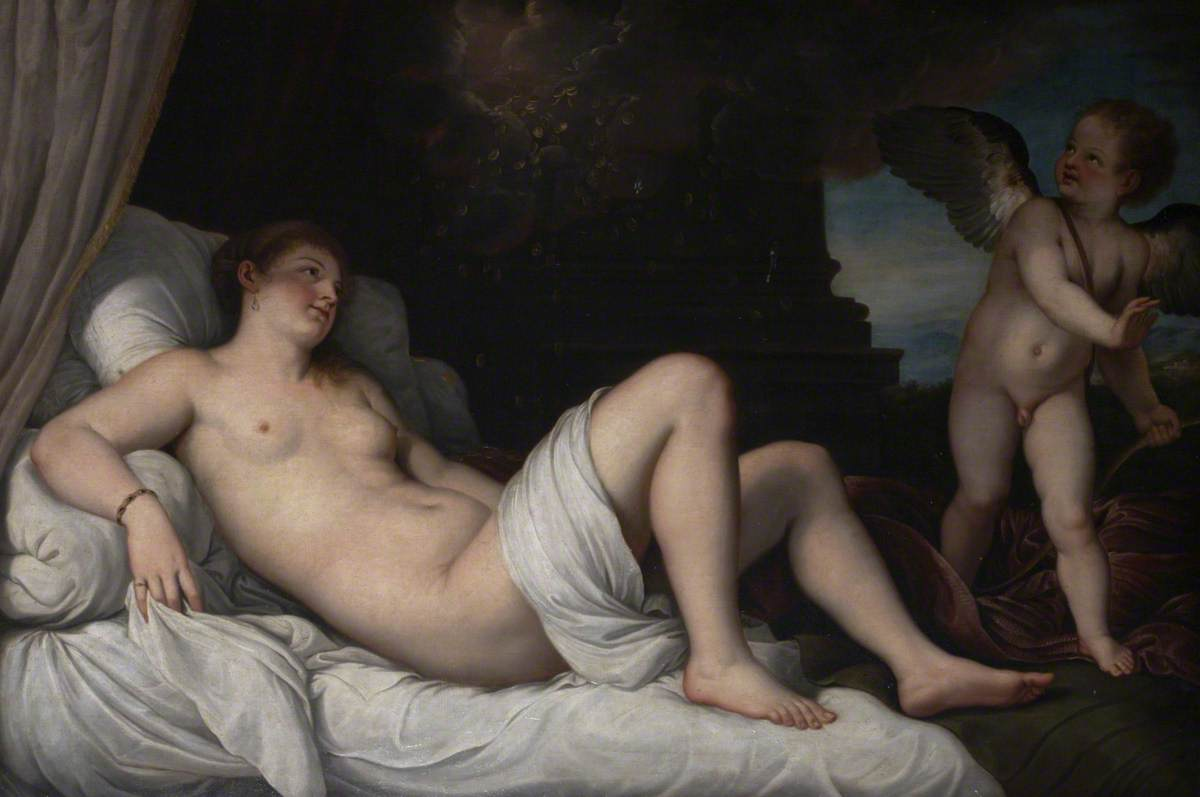
After Titian's Danaë (c. 1772–3)

Among pictures painted by him are:

1. Portrait of Gerald Griffin. [Corporation of Limerick].
2. Thomas Hussey, Bishop of Waterford. Engraved by W. Hincks, and published by Collopy at 4 Little Maddox Street, London, in 1783.
3. Sir Peter Francis Bourgeois, RA. Engraved by W. Ridley for the Monthly Mirror, April 1804.
4. The Ascension. Painted in 1782. [Augustinian Convent, Limerick].
5. Cupid. In collection of John Morton sold in Limerick in January 1900.
