= Laurence Sterne's correspondence with Elizabeth Draper =

Published series of letters

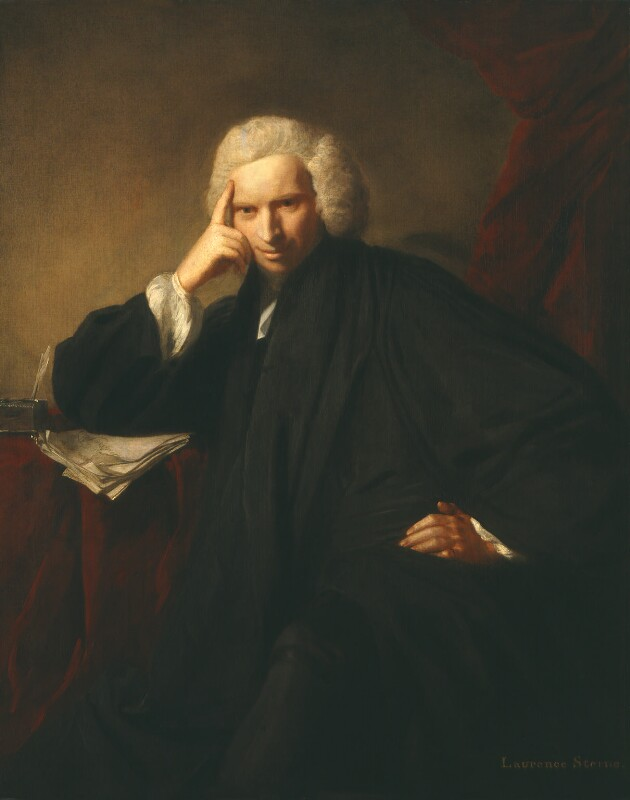
Laurence Sterne in 1760, painted by Joshua Reynolds

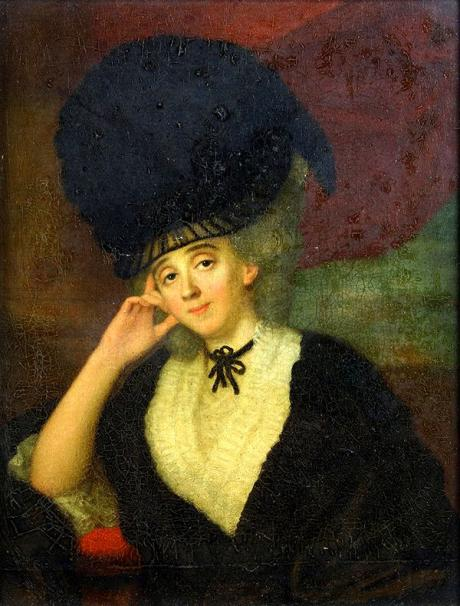
Elizabeth Draper in 1770, painted by John Raphael Smith

Laurence Sterne's correspondence with Elizabeth Draper took place in 1767, and was partially published in 1773 and 1904. In the final year of his life, the author Laurence Sterne had an intense emotional relationship with Elizabeth Draper. They met in January 1767, and immediately began a friendship; their public affection attracted gossip, since both were married, and Sterne was a clergyman. After three months, Draper left London to return to her husband in Bombay. They never saw each other again, and Sterne died in March 1768.

Sterne and Draper exchanged letters throughout their relationship, and after Draper's departure they kept journals intended for the other's eyes. The majority of the correspondence—including all of Draper's replies—has been lost. Ten of Sterne's letters were published as Letters from Yorick to Eliza (1773) and part of his diary as Journal to Eliza (1904). The diary has particularly intrigued scholars due to its ambiguity as a potentially-fictionalized account. Their correspondence influenced Sterne's composition of his last novel, A Sentimental Journey Through France and Italy (1768).

== Sterne and Draper's relationship ==
Sterne met and fell in love with Elizabeth Draper in January 1767. He was introduced to her by her friends, Commodore William James and his wife Anna, whom Sterne also met and befriended at this time. (Note: The Jameses lived in Soho, and formed the heart of a social group associated with the East India Company.) Draper was an intellectual with bluestocking aspirations, sentimental and romantically minded, and the young wife of an absent older husband. (Note: Elizabeth was born in India to English parents and raised between Bombay and England. In 1758, at age fourteen, she was married to Daniel Draper. In Bombay, they had a son in 1759 and a daughter in 1761. In 1765, the Drapers brought their small children to England for their education. Daniel returned to Bombay in March 1766, and Elizabeth remained in England with their children an additional year, leaving them behind when she returned to India. By 1772, the couple had ceased living together, and Elizabeth permanently separated from her husband in 1773.) Sterne's own wife and daughter resided at this time in France.

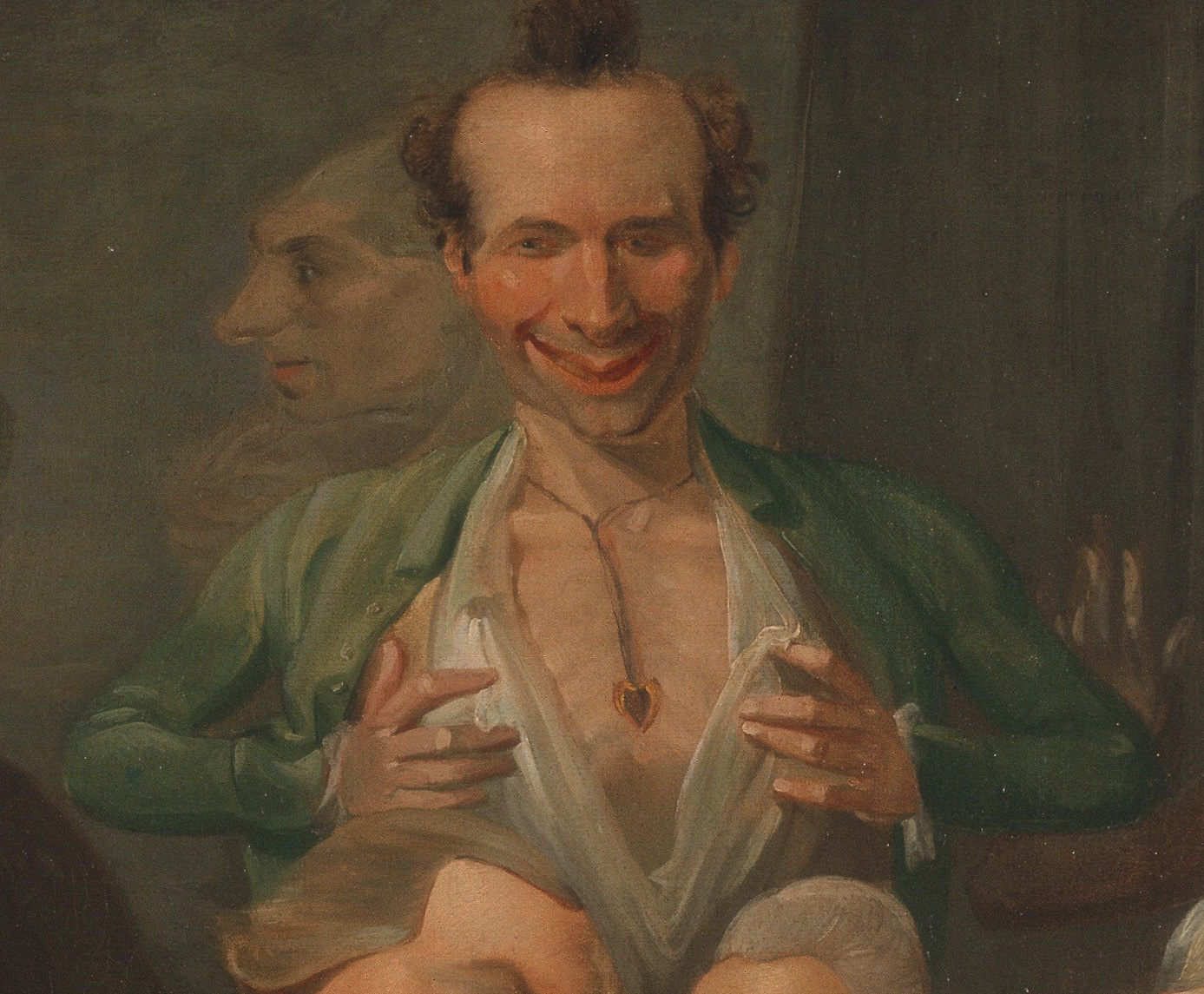
A caricature of Laurence Sterne, ostentatiously exposing a heart-shaped locket (presumably holding Draper's portrait), painted by John Hamilton Mortimer in 1767. Sterne actually displayed Draper's portrait on his snuff-box, but Mortimer depicts him with a locket for visual clarity.

While Draper was in London, they exchanged tokens of affection and were the subject of some gossip, but historians consider it unlikely that their relationship became sexual. Sterne gave Draper a complete set of his books, a signet ring to seal letters with, and a mezzotint copy of his portrait by Joshua Reynolds; and Draper gave him a miniature portrait of herself. As was common in the eighteenth century, they wrote letters to be carried just a few blocks between their London residences. Sterne often showed off Draper's letters and her portrait (mounted in his snuffbox), to an extent that earned him some mockery. The scandalous nature of their public flirtation was intensified by Sterne's occupation as a clergyman. The difference in their ages was also substantial, Sterne being fifty-three to Draper's twenty-two.

Draper left London in March 1767, after only three months together with Sterne. Sterne saw her off from London; she travelled from there to Gravesend to board the Earl of Chatham, which departed on April 3. While she waited for her ship, Sterne wrote her a letter expressing his love, and declaring a desire for marriage if their respective spouses died. (Note: This letter reads: "Talking of widows—pray, Eliza, if ever you are such, do not think of giving yourself to some wealthy nabob—because I design to marry you myself—My wife cannot live long ... and I know not the woman I should like so well for her substitute as yourself.") As part of the home renovations he undertook at Shandy Hall, he prepared a room with her in mind, which is still known as "Eliza's room". They never saw each other again, as Sterne died one year later.

== Original correspondence and publication history ==
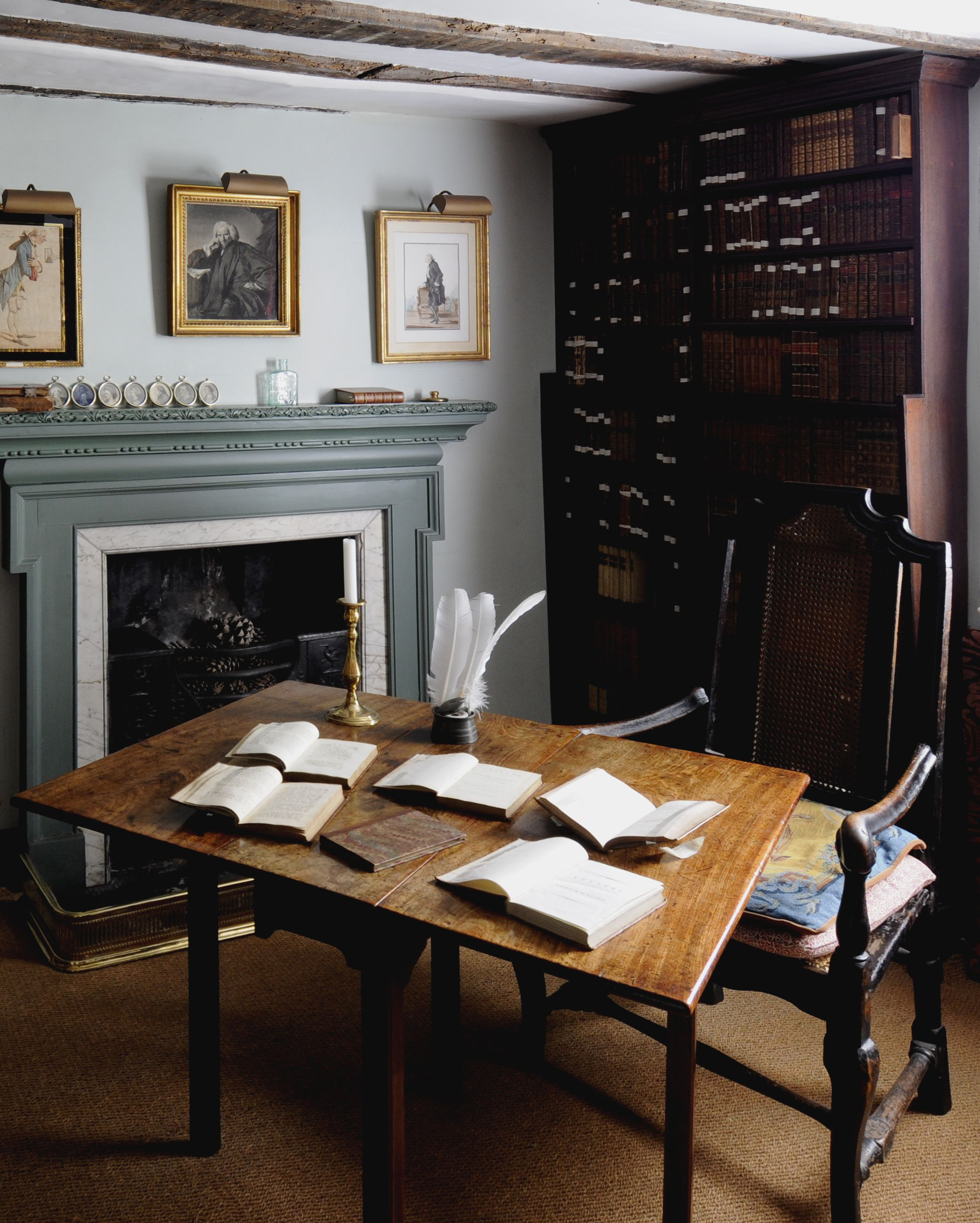
Sterne's study at Shandy Hall, where he likely composed many of the later journal entries

Sterne and Draper's correspondence began the day they met, when Sterne wrote Draper a letter alongside the volumes of his complete works that he sent her. They continued to correspond by letter throughout Draper's time in London and while she travelled; while Draper was waiting for her ship, Sterne's letters were sent daily. No manuscripts survive of any of these letters. In addition, both wrote daily journals intended for each other's eyes. Sterne sent Draper two journal installments: the first to reach her while she was waiting for her ship, and the second to India on April 12, 1767. Both of these, and Draper's corresponding journals, are lost; Sterne's third journal is the only one extant. Its first entry was written on April 12, (Note: The entry itself is erroneously dated as Sunday April 13, 1767, but Sunday was April 12 that year; the whole first week of entries are mis-dated by one day.) and the last date is a postscript on November 1, 1767, saying that he was occupied with writing A Sentimental Journey and would resume his journal entries in January. Instead of sending this third journal to Draper, he left it with her friend Anna James in England in the hope that Draper would some day return to the country to retrieve it.

The first material published from their correspondence were ten letters written from Sterne to Draper before she left for India. These were published in 1773, without Draper's replies, under the title Letters from Yorick to Eliza. The publication appeared prior to Draper's return to England in 1776. Two response publications, containing entirely invented letters purporting to be by Draper, were published in 1775 with the titles Letters from Eliza to Yorick and An humble tribute to the memory of Mr. Sterne. By a lady.

The next publication came in 1904, when Wilbur L. Cross first published Sterne's third journal as The Journal to Eliza and Various Letters, by Laurence Sterne and Elizabeth Draper. This journal was discovered in the nineteenth century by Thomas Washbourne Gibbs, who found it among his father's papers in 1878. In addition to the journal, Gibbs found three letters from Sterne (two to the Jameses and one to Draper's husband), and one letter from Draper to Anne James. At Gibbs's death, these manuscripts were left to the British Museum, where they are now held.

== Letters from Yorick to Eliza ==
Letters from Yorick to Eliza was the first letter collection of Sterne's correspondence to be published, and the publication helped shape his posthumous reputation. It consisted of ten of Sterne's letters to Draper, published in 1773 by William Johnston and reprinted in Philadelphia the same year. (Note: The bibliographer Melvyn New identifies this publisher as someone based on Ludgate Street, who previously published A Pronouncing and Spelling Dictionary (1764) and A Short Grammar of the English Language (1772), not a more famous William Johnston who sold Francis Fawkes' books.) The volume is dedicated to Lord Henry Apsley; in one of the published letters, Sterne recounts to Draper a generous compliment paid to him by Apsley's father Allen Bathurst. The book itself is physically small and short, an octavo of ninety pages.

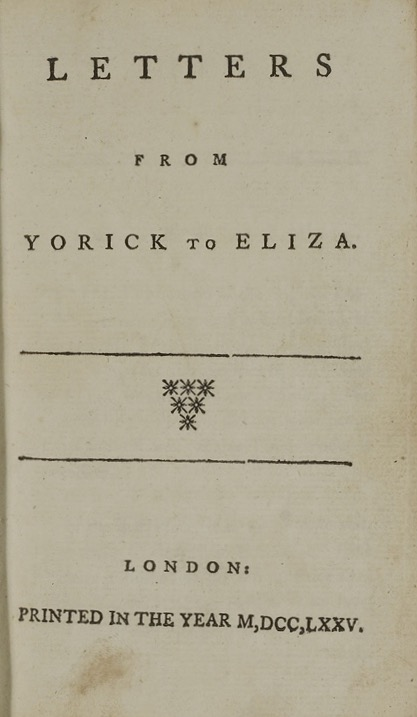
Title page of the 1775 second edition of Letters from Yorick to Eliza.

The first edition in 1773 was not advertised or reviewed, leading the bibliographer Wilbur Cross to argue that it was "a semi-private publication". A more widely-circulated second edition was published in 1775 with corrections, followed by four more printings in London and a pirated edition. This edition was advertised several times in conjunction with that year's publication of Sterne's Letters to his Friends on Various Occasions. Cross suggests that the corrections may have involved consulting a new copy of the letters, though new errors are also added. None of the letters are dated, and only in the third edition are they numbered.

It is unclear how involved Draper was in this publication. 1773 is the year Draper left her husband, but she would not leave India until 1776 and therefore certainly did not personally oversee the publication of either edition in London. The editor of the letter collection is anonymous, and claims that he received the letters from a gentleman who copied them from the originals in Bombay with Draper's blessing. The editor says that Draper denied permission to publish any of her replies, which is consistent with an extant letter from Draper to Anna James in 1772. Writing to James, Draper is distressed that Sterne's widow and daughter gained access to her letters after Sterne's death. According to Draper, they were blackmailing her, demanding payment to avoid publication. Draper wrote to the bookseller Thomas Becket offering to reimburse him for lost profits if he returned her letters instead of publishing them. The literary historians New and de Voogd suggest that Draper might have supported publishing Sterne's letters as a "preemptive strike" to avoid publication of her own, because hers would be comparatively less interesting; they say that the accusation of extortion "casts a dark pall over the Sterne women". Sterne's biographer Arthur Cash is more critical of Draper. He says that the publication came after Draper's own letters had been returned to her. He concludes that she was not motivated by money (since the book was not advertised), and instead could only be motivated by vanity. (Note: He says: "It was scandalous of her to make public Sterne's letters, so flattering to her, without supplying her own to him, which would have revealed her part in this love game. It was especially reprehensible to release Sterne's letters while [Sterne's widow] Elizabeth was alive.")

=== Fraudulent response volumes ===
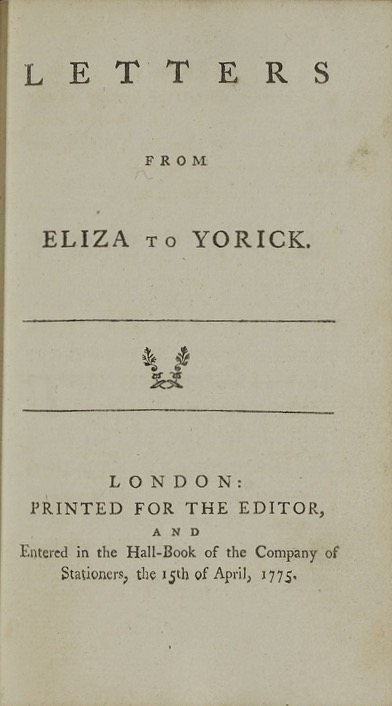
Title page of the 1775 fraudulent response volume Letters from Eliza to Yorick

A purported response volume Letters from Eliza to Yorick was published April 17, 1775 and reprinted a second time that same year. This collection was self-published, with the title page stating only that it was "printed for the editor". Eighteenth-century readers generally believed it to be authentic, but the letters are entirely invented, generally framed as direct responses to the letters from Sterne which had previously been published. The collection was reviewed in The Gentleman's Magazine in May 1775. The scholar J. C. T. Oates dismisses the quality of its writing, calling it "stodgily high-minded". It was often bound with the 1775 second edition of the authentic Letters from Yorick to Eliza, creating an apparently complete work.

Another purported collection of replies published in 1775 was An humble Tribute to the Memory of Mr. Sterne. By a Lady, printed by J. Wilkie. Oates is even more dismissive of this volume; he says that it makes Letters from Eliza to Yorick look like "a work of rare talent" in comparison.

== Journal to Eliza ==
Sterne's extant journal is a manuscript book with Sterne's notes filling about half its pages. The first page of the journal is labeled with the title "The Journal to Eliza", and the second page has the title "Continuation of the Bramines Journal." Modern editions have titled it as both Journal to Eliza and Bramine's Journal. The title may be an homage to Jonathan Swift's Journal to Stella, a similar collection of letters to a woman secretly beloved.

Sterne's biographer Arthur Cash describes the style of the letters as vague and humourless, but sweet. As such, the collection "shows a different side of Sterne from the witty high-spirited author of Tristram Shandy", according to the Laurence Sterne Trust. Compared to Sterne's other known correspondence, the scholar Peter Budrin says that the Journal "appears more intimate and less outwardly 'constructed'". Tim Parnell, in the Oxford World's Classics edition of Journal to Eliza, also says that its "tearful intimacies" are "quite unlike anything else Sterne wrote". The primary recurring topics are love and illness.

=== Analysis ===
Sterne's writing is characteristically metafictional, and in the Journal this manifests as ambiguity concerning whether it was written as a private extended love letter to Elizabeth Draper, or was intended for publication as literature. It appears to be both autobiographical and an imaginative work of fiction. Parnell describes it as occupying "a generic no-man's land somewhere between intimate correspondence and fiction designed for public consumption". The first page of Sterne's journal provides the following preface:

This Journal wrote under the fictitious names of Yorick & Draper—and sometimes of the Bramin & Bramine—but 'tis a Diary of the miserable feelings of a person separated from a Lady for whose Society he languish'd—The real Names—are foreign—& the acct. a copy from a french Manst.—in Mr. S——'s hands—but wrote as it is, to cast a Viel over them—There is a Counterpart—which is the Lady's acct. what transactions daily happend—& what Sentiments occupied her mind, during this Separation from her admirer—these are worth reading—the translator cannot say so much in favr. of Yoricks which seem to have little merit beyond their honesty & truth. (Note: This journal was written under the fictitious names of Yorick & Draper—and sometimes of the Bramin & Bramine—but it is a diary of the miserable feelings of a person separated from a lady for whose society he languished. The real names are foreign, and the account is a copy from a French manuscript in Mr. S——'s hands, but it is written as it is to cast a veil over them. There is a counterpart, which is the lady's account of what transactions daily happened and what sentiments occupied her mind, during this separation from her admirer. These are worth reading—the translator cannot say so much in favour of Yorick's, which seem to have little merit beyond their honesty and truth.)

This preface superficially resembles the common narrative device known as a found manuscript, in which a work of fiction makes a false claim to be based on an authentic document, but in Sterne's correspondence it is inverted to make his real diary seem fictional. Some scholars have concluded from this framing that Sterne intended to publish the journal.

The author adopts the pseudonym Parson Yorick, who previously appeared in his two best known novels, The Life and Opinions of Tristram Shandy, Gentleman and A Sentimental Journey through France and Italy. In Tristram Shandy we are told that the parson is related to the famous, fictional jester Yorick whose skull is disinterred in William Shakespeare's Hamlet: "It has often come into my head, that this post could be no other than that of the king's chief Jester;—and that Hamlet's Yorick, in our Shakespear, many of whose plays, you know, are founded upon authenticated facts,—was certainly the very man."

In a second example of the author's playfulness with names, Sterne and Eliza receive the pet names 'Bramin' and 'Bramine' throughout. Given the Brahmin Hindu priestly caste is renowned for austerity and wisdom, Sterne thereby draws attention to his real-life role as a priest. Simultaneously, Eliza's epithet Bramine highlights her connections with India. This playful religious name-calling serves to remind the reader that Sterne was an Anglican clergyman. Remembered now for his fiction, during his lifetime more copies of his sermons were published than of his novels.

== Influence on A Sentimental Journey ==
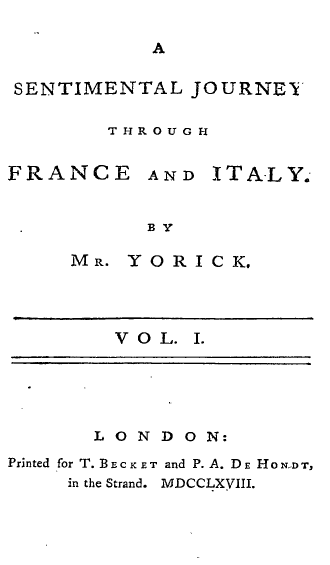
Title page of A Sentimental Journey Through France and Italy (1768)

Sterne and Draper's correspondence coincided with Sterne's composition of his last novel, A Sentimental Journey Through France and Italy (1768). Sterne's letters commented on and influenced his novel-writing, and both express intense, frustrated desire. Cross describes their correspondence, especially Sterne's journal, as "the emotional history lying behind and thus explaining in a measure the style, tone, and mood of the Sentimental Journey". The ten Letters from Yorick to Eliza were often included in publications of A Sentimental Journey as an appendix, inviting readers to connect the novel to Sterne's personal life.

The opening of the novel contains an apostrophe from Yorick (Sterne's fictional alter ego) to "Eliza", promising to wear her portrait on his necklace until his death. One of Sterne's diary entries from the time of composition identifies this as a declaration of his affection:

I have brought your name Eliza! and Picture into my work— where they will remain— when You and I are at rest for ever— Some Annotator or explainer of my works in this place will take occasion, to speak of the Friendship which Subsisted so long and faithfully betwixt Yorick and the Lady he speaks of ... he will tell the world ... That their Affections for each other were unbounded—

One concern that appears in both A Sentimental Journey and Sterne's correspondence is the relationship between sexuality and moral virtue. Sterne's correspondence with Draper falls into the vocabulary of emotional sensibility, disavowing sexuality in favour of an intense commitment to high-minded feelings. Tim Parnell's introduction to A Sentimental Journey suggests that "Sterne had become genuinely uncomfortable with his rakish, sexual self". In contrast, the novel does not treat sexual desire as incompatible with spiritual faith or moral goodness; instead, it suggests that desire is one way of encouraging people toward the pro-social qualities of friendliness and generosity. Since the novel was completed after Sterne's last known correspondence, the novel can be read as a response to his experience with Draper.
