= Sir George Duckett, 1st Baronet =

British naval administrator and politician

Sir George Duckett Bt
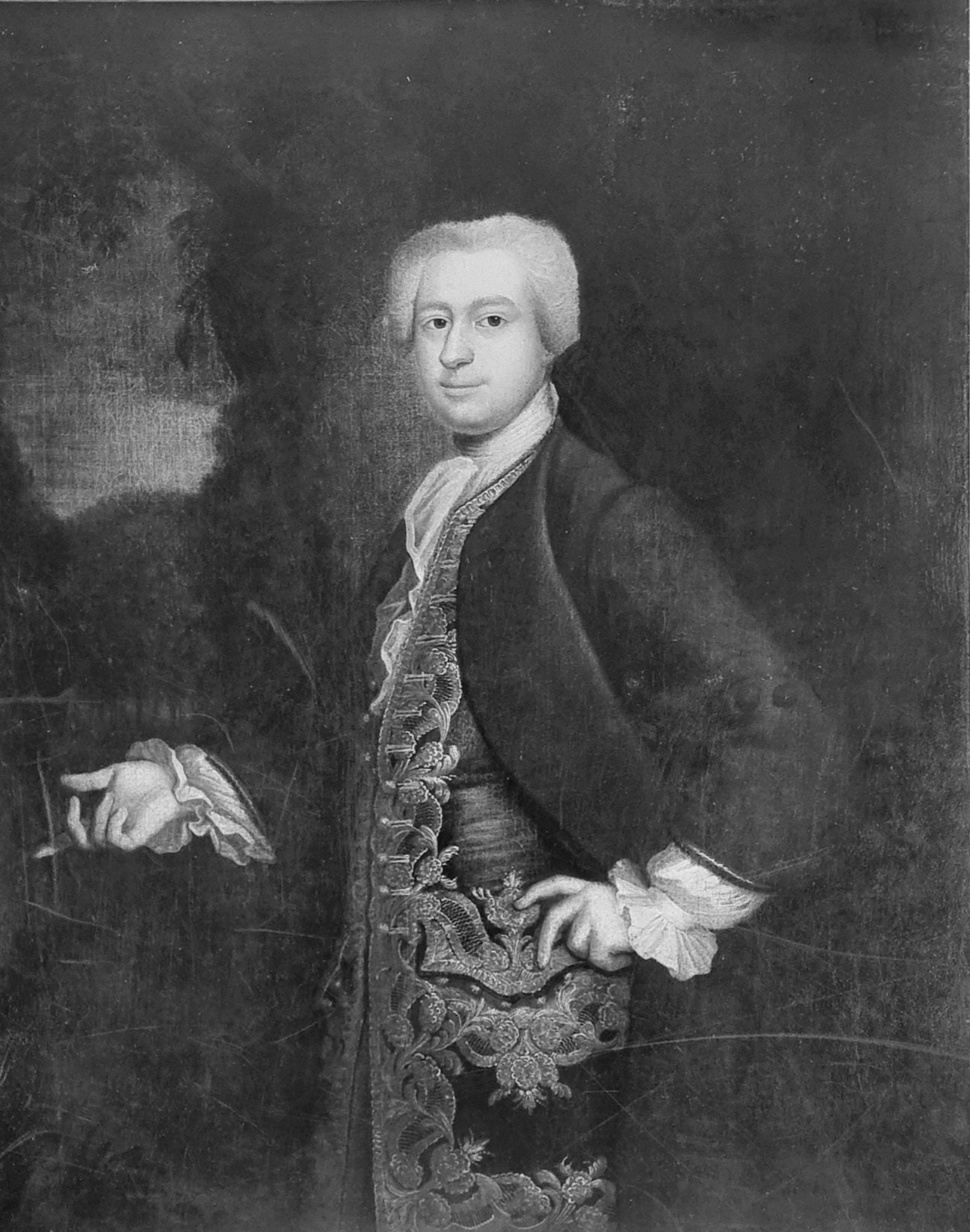
- Portrait of Sir George Jackson-Duckett
- Born: George Jackson; 24 October 1725
- Died: 22 December 1822 (aged 97)
- Occupations: Administrator, politician

Sir George Duckett, 1st Baronet (24 October 1725 – 22 December 1822) was a British naval administrator and politician.

Born George Jackson, probably in Yorkshire, the third but oldest surviving son of George Jackson (1687/8–1758) of Hill House, Richmond, Yorkshire, and Ellerton Abbey, Yorkshire, and Hannah, daughter of William Ward of Guisborough, Yorkshire. He sat as Member of Parliament (MP) for Weymouth & Melcombe Regis from 1786 to 1788, and for Colchester from 1790 to 1796. He was created a baronet on 21 June 1791.

Jackson was made Deputy Secretary to The Admiralty in 1766 and appointed Judge Advocate of the Fleet in 1768. In this capacity he was largely responsible for the conduct of the court martial of Admiral Lord Keppel in 1779 and the subsequent enquiry into the evidence of Sir Hugh Palliser. Jackson resigned from the secretaryship in 1782 but remained Judge Advocate until his death.

He was a friend and patron of Captain James Cook. In his honour, Captain Cook named both Cape Jackson in New Zealand, and Port Jackson in New South Wales, Australia. He was interested in improving inland waterways, and was sole proprietor of the Stort Navigation in Hertfordshire.

He married firstly in 1745 his cousin Mary Ward (d.1754), and they had three sons and three daughters. Secondly, on 9 September 1775 at St Margaret's Church, Westminster, he married Grace Neale (c.1750–1798), widow of Robert Neale and granddaughter of George Duckett (MP for Calne), with whom he had a son, George (born 1777). In 1797 under the terms of the will of her uncle Thomas Duckett, Sir George assumed, by Royal Licence, the name and arms of that family, becoming Sir George Duckett, 1st Baronet. He was succeeded in the baronetcy by his son George.

Parliament of Great Britain
Preceded by Gabriel Steward; John Purling; Welbore Ellis; Sir Thomas Rumbold, Bt	Member of Parliament for Weymouth & Melcombe Regis; 1786–1788; With: John Purling; Welbore Ellis; Sir Thomas Rumbold, Bt	Succeeded by Gabriel Steward; John Purling; Welbore Ellis; Sir Thomas Rumbold, Bt
Preceded by George Tierney; Sir Robert Smyth, Bt	Member of Parliament for Colchester; 1790–1796; With: Robert Thornton	Succeeded by The Lord Muncaster; Robert Thornton
Baronetage of Great Britain
New creation	Baronet (of Hartham House); 1791–1822	Succeeded by George Duckett
