= Sir George Rumbold, 2nd Baronet =

British diplomat

Sir George Rumbold, 2nd Baronet (17 August 1764 – 15 December 1807) was a British diplomat who was ambassador to the Hanseatic League.

== Early life ==
George Berriman Rumbold was born in Fort William, India, where his father Thomas Rumbold worked for the East India Company. Berriman was his paternal grandmother's maiden name.

He was educated privately and at Christ's College, Cambridge.

== Career ==
He joined the Diplomatic Service and in 1803 was appointed ambassador to the Hanse Towns, minister-resident of Great Britain at Hamburg (at that time a "free city"), and chargé d'affaires to the Circle of Lower Saxony.

On the night of 24 October 1804 Rumbold was abducted by French troops on the pretext that British Ministers on the Continent had conspired against France. Joseph Fouché, the Minister of Police in Paris, had sent an order in the name of Napoleon to Marshal Bernadotte commanding French occupation troops in Hanover.

A detachment of 250 French troops embarked in boats at Harburg, in Hanoverian territory. They crossed the river Elbe, landed on the Hamburg side, proceeded to Rumbold's residence, forced the door, and compelled him to deliver up his papers. He was then taken to Hanover in a guarded coach, thence to Paris, and confined in the Temple. In Berlin great indignation was expressed and the King of Prussia, as Protector of the Circle of Lower Saxony and guardian of the free cities, ordered his minister at Paris to demand Rumbold's release. The next day, on the orders of Napoleon, he was conveyed to Cherbourg and put on board a French cutter, sailing under flag of truce, which delivered him to the British frigate Niobe, in which he arrived at Portsmouth. The papers seized at Hamburg remain in the Archives nationales in Paris and reveal no conspiracy.

Rumbold returned to Hamburg where he was replaced in 1806. He died of fever at Memel on 15 December 1807.

== Family ==
George Rumbold's father was made a baronet in the 1770s. George was the second son, but his elder brother died before his father, so George inherited the baronetcy on his father's death in 1791. In 1783 he had married Caroline Hearn, who became Lady Rumbold; their elder son William became the 3rd Baronet in 1807. In October 1810, Lady Rumbold married Sir Sidney Smith, with whom Rumbold had worked.

Diplomatic posts
Preceded by Sir James Craufurd	Minister Resident to the Hanse Towns and Minister Plenipotentiary to Lower Saxony; 1803–1806	Succeeded by Edward Thornton
Baronetage of Great Britain
Preceded by Thomas Rumbold	Baronet (of Woodhall); 1791–1807	Succeeded by William Rumbold
