= Charles Walcott (MP) =

British politician

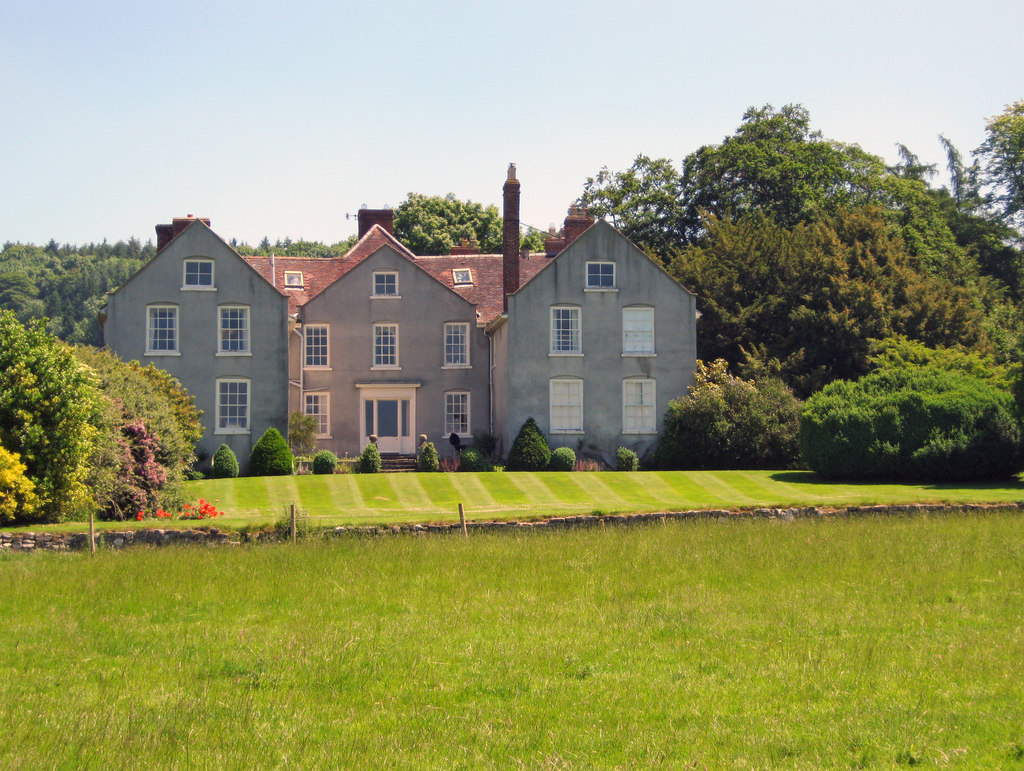
Bitterley Court, seat of the Walcot family, Bitterley, Shropshire

Charles Walcot (c.1733–1799) was a British politician.

Walcot was the son of John Walcot (MP for Shropshire) and Mary, daughter of Sir Francis Dashwood, and grandson of Charles Walcot of Lydbury North and Elizabeth Brydges, sister of James Brydges, 1st Duke of Chandos. He was educated at Westminster School and Magdalen College, Oxford. A fellow of All Souls College, University of Oxford, he sold the family estate of Walcot at Lydbury North to Robert Clive, 1st Baron Clive to settle his father's debts. He then purchased Bitterley Court, Bitterley, Shropshire, which was the family seat until 1899.

He served as Member of Parliament for Weymouth from 1763 to 1769 and also served as High Sheriff of Shropshire in 1782.

He died in September, 1799. In 1764, he had married his cousin Anne Levett, daughter of Reverend Richard Levett, rector of Blithfield, Staffordshire and his wife Catherine Walcott. They had two sons and a daughter.
