= Andrew Stuart (1725–1801) =

18th-century Scottish lawyer and politician

Andrew Stuart (1725 - 1801) was a Scottish lawyer and politician who sat in the House of Commons between 1774 and 1801.

== Biography ==
Stuart was the second son of Archibald Stuart of Torrance in Lanarkshire (died 1767), seventh son and heir of Alexander Stuart of Torrance. His mother, Elizabeth, was daughter of Sir Andrew Myreton of Gogar, bart. He studied law at Edinburgh, and became a member of the Scottish bar. He was employed by James Hamilton, 6th Duke of Hamilton, as tutor to his children, and through his influence was in 1770 appointed Keeper of the Signet of Scotland.

Stuart was involved in the Douglas Cause in which the Duke of Hamilton disputed the identity of Archibald James Edward Douglas, first baron Douglas, and endeavoured to hinder his succession to the family estates. Stuart was engaged to conduct the case against the claimant. In the course of the suit, which was finally decided in the House of Lords in February 1769 in favour of Douglas, he distinguished himself highly, but so much feeling arose between him and Edward Thurlow (afterwards Lord Thurlow), the opposing counsel, that a duel took place. After the decision of the case Stuart in 1773 published a series of Letters to Lord Mansfield (London, 4to), who had been a judge in the case, and who had very strongly supported the claims of Douglas. In these epistles he assailed Mansfield for his want of impartiality with a force and eloquence that caused him at the time to be regarded as a worthy rival to Junius.

From 1777 to 1781 he was occupied with the affairs of his younger brother, Colonel James Stuart (died 1793), who had been suspended from his position by the East India Company for the arrest of Lord Pigot, the governor of the Madras presidency. He published several letters to the directors of the East India Company and to the secretary at war, in which his brother's case was set forth with great clearness and vigour. These letters called forth a reply from Alexander Dalrymple.

On 28 October 1774 Stuart was returned to parliament for Lanarkshire, and continued to represent the county until 1784. On 6 July 1779, under Lord North's administration, he was appointed to the Board of Trade in place of Bamber Gascoyne, and continued a member until the temporary abolition of the board in 1782. On 19 July 1790 he re-entered parliament, after an absence of six years, as member for Weymouth and Melcombe Regis, for which boroughs he sat until his death.

Stuart succeeded to the estate of Torrance on the death of his elder brother, Alexander, without issue, on 23 March 1796 and on the death of Sir John Stuart of Castlemilk, Lanarkshire on 18 January 1797, he succeeded to that property also. In 1798 he published a Genealogical History of the Stewarts (London, 4to), in which he contended that, failing the royal line (the descendants of Stewart of Darnley), the head of all the Stuarts was Stuart of Castlemilk, and that he himself was Stuart of that ilk, heir male of the ancient family. This assertion provoked an anonymous rejoinder, to which Stuart replied in 1799.

Stuart died in Lower Grosvenor Street, London, on 18 May 1801, without an heir male. He married Margaret, daughter of Sir William Stirling of Ardoch, bart. After his death in 1804 she married Sir William Johnson Pulteney, fifth baronet of Wester Hall. By her Stuart had three daughters. The youngest, Charlotte, in 1830 married Robert Harington, younger son of Sir John Edward Harington, eighth baronet of Ridlington in Rutland; through her, on the death of her elder sisters, the estate of Torrance descended to its present [1898] occupier, Colonel Robert Edward Harington-Stuart, while Castlemilk reverted to the family of Stirling-Stuart, descendants of William Stirling of Keir and Cawder, who married, in 1781, Jean, daughter of Sir John Stuart of Castlemilk.

Stuart's portrait was painted by Joshua Reynolds and engraved by Thomas Watson. Some notes made by him in July 1789 on charters in the Scottish College at Paris are preserved in the Stowe MSS. at the British Museum, No. 551, f. 56.

Parliament of Great Britain
Preceded by John Lockhart-Ross	Member of Parliament for Lanarkshire; 1774–1784	Succeeded by Sir James Steuart Denham, 8th Bt
Preceded by Welbore Ellis; Sir Thomas Rumbold, Bt; John Purling; Gabriel Steward	Member of Parliament for Weymouth and Melcombe Regis; 1790–1800; With: Sir James Murray 1790–1811; Richard Bempde Johnstone 1790–96; Thomas Tyrwhitt Jones 1790–91; Sir James Johnstone, Bt 1791–94; Gabriel Tucker Steward 1794–1810; William Garthshore 1796–1806	Succeeded by Parliament of the United Kingdom
Parliament of the United Kingdom
Preceded by Parliament of Great Britain	Member of Parliament for Weymouth and Melcombe Regis; January 1801 – May 1801; With: Sir James Pulteney, 7th Bt; William Garthshore; Gabriel Tucker Steward	Succeeded by Sir James Pulteney, 7th Bt; William Garthshore; Gabriel Tucker Steward; Charles Adams
