= James Pulteney =

British Army officer and politician (1755–1811)

General The Right Honourable Sir James Pulteney Bt
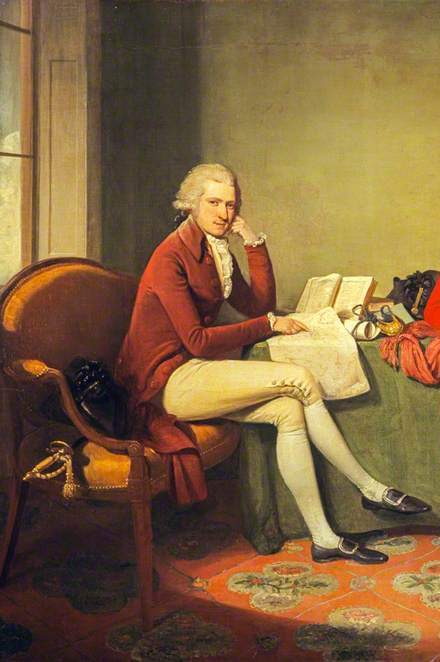
- Portrait by John Thomas Seton
- Born: c. 1755
- Died: 26 April 1811
- Military career
- Allegiance: Great Britain; United Kingdom
- Branch: British Army
- Rank: General
- Conflicts: American War of Independence; French Revolutionary Wars; Napoleonic Wars

General Sir James Murray Pulteney, 7th Baronet, PC (c. 1755 – 26 April 1811) was a British Army officer and politician who served in the American War of Independence and French Revolutionary and Napoleonic Wars.

== Background and education ==
Born James Murray, he was the eldest son of Colonel Sir Robert Murray, 6th Baronet and his first wife Janet Murray, a younger sister of Patrick Murray, 5th Lord Elibank. Murray succeeded his father as baronet in 1771, while still a minor. He was educated at Westminster School and joined then the British Army.

== Military career ==
Murray had had his first commission purchased in his mid-teens, as lieutenant in the 19th Regiment of Foot in 1770. Already a year later, he became captain in the 57th Regiment of Foot. He left for Europe in 1772 and having spent the time travelling, he returned to his regiment in Ireland in November 1775. At the beginning of the next year, Murray embarked for The Colonies to serve in the American War of Independence. He was wounded at the ankle during the Battle of Brandywine in September 1777, and shared his convalescence with his cousin Patrick Ferguson. Soon after recovering, he was shot through the thigh at the Battle of White Marsh in November.

Murray purchased a majority in 1778, serving with the 4th Regiment of Foot in the West Indies and was involved in the Battle of St Lucia. He became lieutenant-colonel of the 94th Regiment of Foot in 1780 and on the regiment's disbandment after three years was set on halfpay. In 1789, he was transferred to active duty and was appointed an aide-de-camp to King George III the United Kingdom, ranked as a colonel. Murray was sent to Koblenz, the headquarters of the allied forces against the French Revolutionary Armies. He was attached as adjudant to the Frederick, Duke of York in April 1793, fighting in Flanders, and was promoted to major-general in December. In 1794, he received command of the 18th Regiment of Foot and led his regiment to suppress the Irish Rebellion of 1798. A year thereafter, in June 1799 Pulteney (he had taken the name of Pulteney in 1794) was made a lieutenant-general and in November was wounded in the Anglo-Russian invasion of Holland, having been second in command. He commanded the Ferrol Expedition in August 1800 and sailed then to Gibraltar, before returning to England. He became General Officer Commanding Eastern District in 1805. In 1808 he became a full general.

== Political career ==
In 1790, he entered the British House of Commons, sitting as a member of parliament (MP) for Weymouth and Melcombe Regis until his death in 1811. Murray-Pulteney was sworn of the privy council in 1807, when he became Secretary at War, a post he held for two years.

== Family and death ==
On 24 July 1794, he married Henriette Laura Pulteney, 1st Baroness Bath, daughter of his cousin Sir William Pulteney, 5th Baronet in Bath House, London. Two days before he had by Royal Licence assumed the surname Pulteney as a condition of his wife becoming the heir to her father's fortune. Henrietta was raised to a countess in her own right in 1803 and inherited the estates of her father in 1805, worth about £50,000 per year. She predeceased her husband in 1808 and Murray survived her for three years, dying in Buckenham in Norfolk, from complications after losing an eye when a powder flask accidentally exploded in his face. He was succeeded in the baronetcy by his halfbrother John.

Parliament of Great Britain
Preceded by Sir Thomas Rumbold; John Purling; Wellbore Ellis; Gabriel Steward	Member of Parliament for Weymouth and Melcombe Regis; 1790–1801; With: Thomas Jones 1790–1791; Richard Bempde Johnstone 1790–1796; Andrew Stuart 1790–1801; Sir James Johnstone 1791–1794; Gabriel Tucker Steward 1794–1801; William Garthshore 1796–1801	Succeeded by Parliament of the United Kingdom
Parliament of the United Kingdom
Preceded by Parliament of Great Britain	Member of Parliament for Weymouth and Melcombe Regis; 1801–1811; With: Gabriel Tucker Steward 1801–1810; William Garthshore 1801–1806; Charles Adams 1801–1811; Richard Augustus Tucker Steward 1806–1811; Sir John Lowther Johnstone 1810–1811	Succeeded by Sir John Murray, 8th Bt; Sir John Lowther Johnstone; Richard Augustus Tucker Steward; Charles Adams
Military offices
Preceded by Sir John Sebright, 6th Bt	Colonel of the 18th Regiment of Foot; 1794–1811	Succeeded by The Lord Hutchinson
Political offices
Preceded by Richard Fitzpatrick	Secretary at War; 1807–1809	Succeeded by Lord Granville Leveson-Gower
Baronetage of Nova Scotia
Preceded by Robert Murray	Baronet (of Dalrany); 1771–1811	Succeeded by John Murray
