= Richard Johnstone (disambiguation) =

Richard Johnstone (1936–2022) was a New Zealand Olympic cyclist.

Richard Johnstone may also refer to:

- Richard Bempde Johnstone

== See also ==
- Richard Johnston (disambiguation)
- Richard Johnson (disambiguation)
