= Thomas Tyrwhitt Jones =

British politician

The Right Honourable Sir Thomas Tyrwhitt Jones, Bt FRS
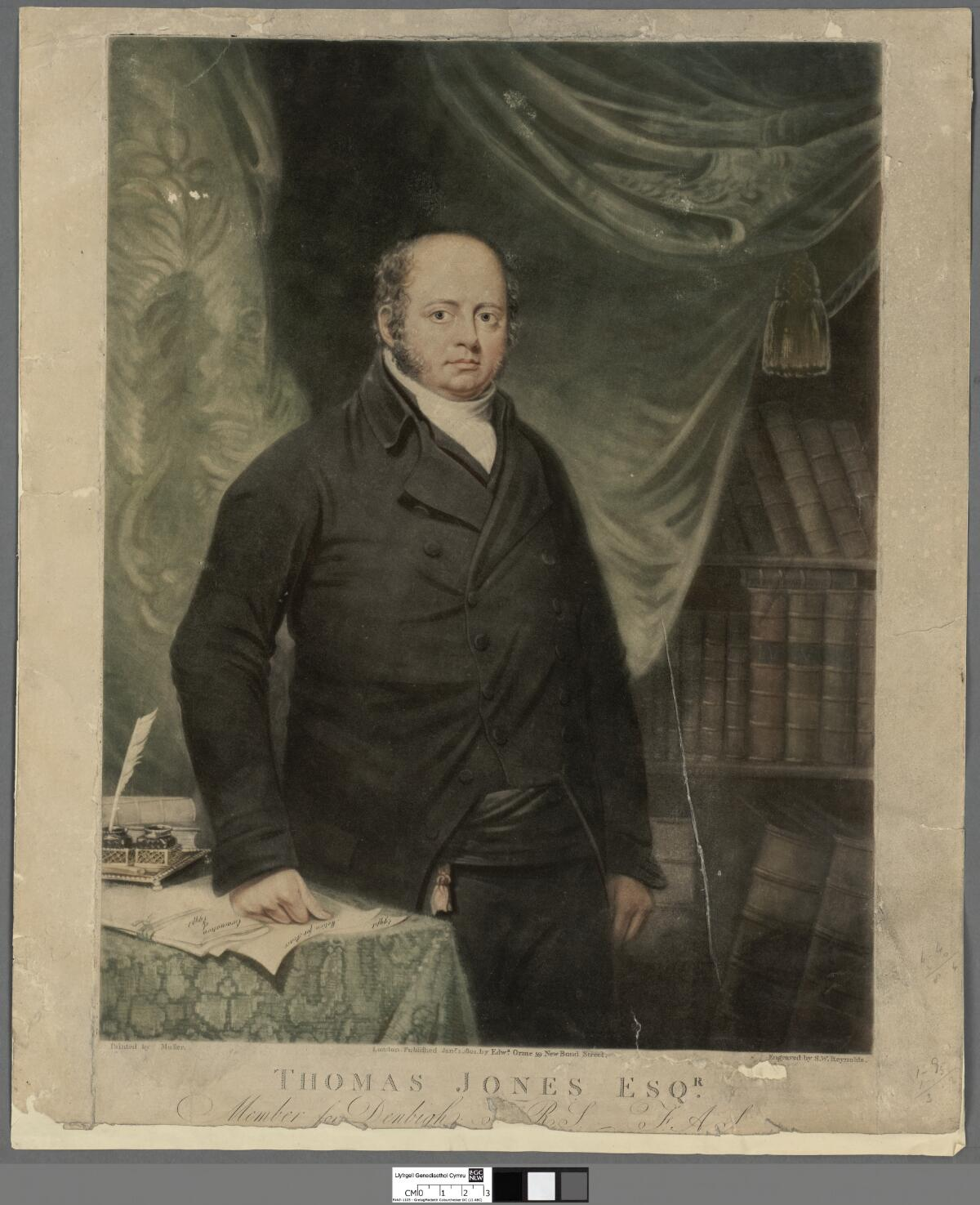
- Portrait of Sir Thomas Jones, Bt from the Welsh Portrait Collection at the National Library of Wales

Member of Parliament for Shrewsbury
- In office 1807–1811 Serving with Hon. William Hill
- Preceded by: Hon. Henry Grey Bennet; Hon. William Hill
- Succeeded by: Hon. William Hill; Hon. Henry Grey Bennet

Member of Parliament for Athlone
- In office 1803–1806
- Preceded by: William Handcock
- Succeeded by: George Tierney

Member of Parliament for Denbigh
- In office 1801–1802
- Preceded by: Parliament of Great Britain
- Succeeded by: Hon. Frederick West
- In office 1797–1800
- Preceded by: Richard Myddelton
- Succeeded by: Parliament of the United Kingdom

Member of Parliament for Weymouth and Melcombe Regis
- In office 1790–1791 Serving with Sir James Murray; Richard Vanden-Bempde-Johnstone; Andrew Stuart
- Preceded by: Welbore Ellis; John Purling; Sir Thomas Rumbold; Gabriel Steward
- Succeeded by: Sir James Murray; Richard Vanden-Bempde-Johnstone; Andrew Stuart; Sir James Johnstone

Personal details
- Born: Thomas Tyrwhitt; 1 September 1765
- Died: 26 November 1811 (aged 46) Clarence Lodge, Roehampton
- Relations: Peniston Booth (grandfather)
- Children: 5, including Thomas
- Parent(s): John Tyrwhitt; Katherine Booth
- Education: Winchester College
- Alma mater: Christ Church, Oxford

Sir Thomas Tyrwhitt Jones, 1st Baronet FRS (1 September 1765 – 26 November 1811) of Stanley Hall, Shropshire, was a British politician.

== Early life ==
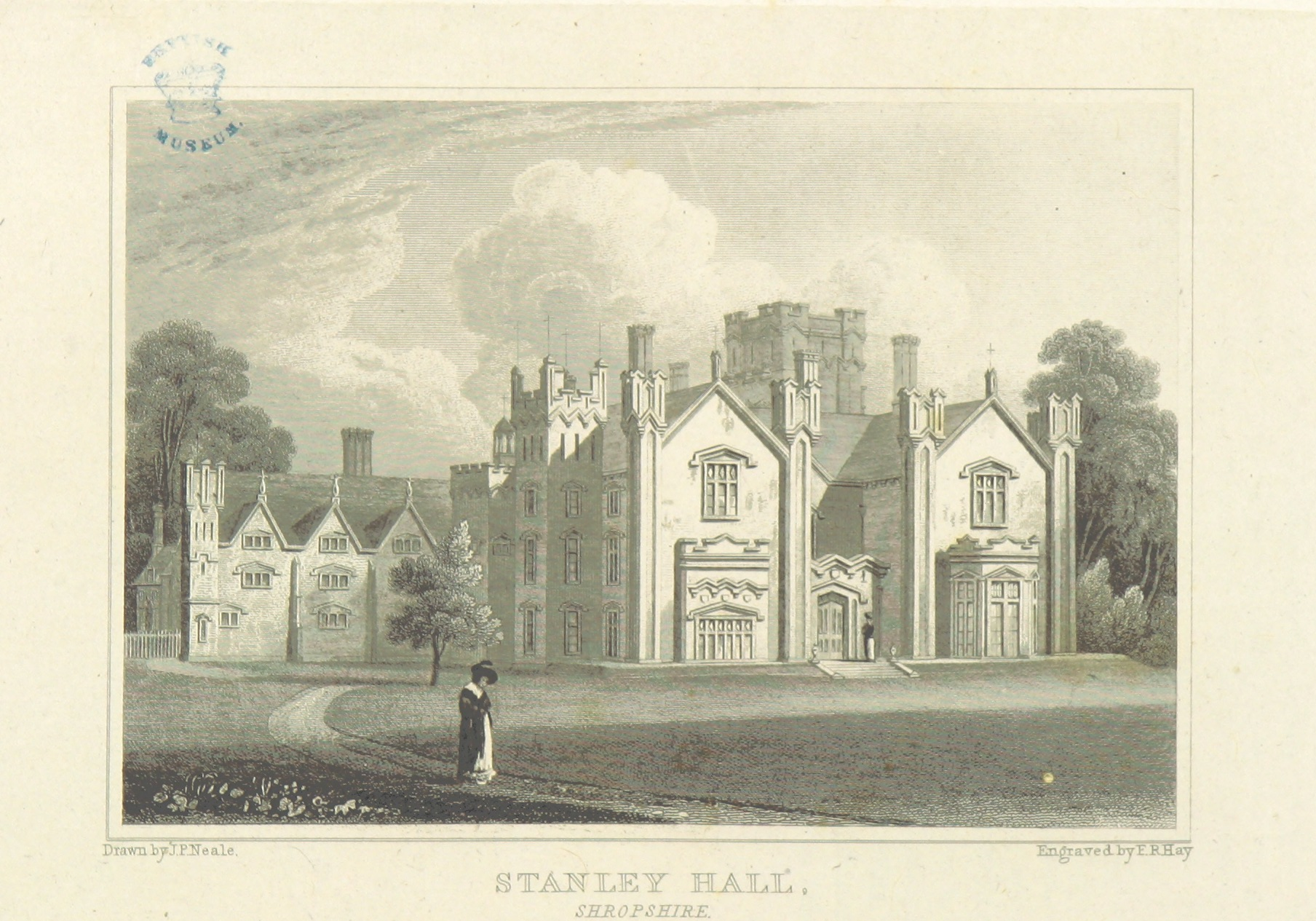
Stanley Hall, Shropshire, 1818

Tyrwhitt was born on 1 September 1765. He was the eldest son of Captain John Tyrwhitt, RN, of Netherclay House, Bishop's Hull, Somerset, and the former Katherine Booth, daughter and heiress of the Very Rev. Peniston Booth, Dean of Windsor and Katherine (née Jones) Booth (a daughter of the Revd Canon Edward Jones). Among his siblings was Richard Tyrwhitt, a barrister who married Elizabeth Lipyeatt.

He was educated at Winchester and Christ Church, Oxford. He succeeded his cousin Sir Thomas Jones in 1782, adopting the additional surname of Jones in 1790.

== Career ==
He was the Member of Parliament for Weymouth and Melcombe Regis from 1790 to June 1791. Jones subsequently represented several other constituencies. He was MP for Denbigh Boroughs from January 1797 to 1802; Athlone from 22 August 1803 to 1806; and Shrewsbury from 1807 to 26 November 1811. He was created a baronet on 3 October 1808.

He was elected a Fellow of the Royal Society in 1800.

== Personal life ==
He married Harriet Rebecca, the daughter of Edward Williams of Eaton Mascott, Shropshire, with whom he had three sons and two daughters, including:

- Sir Thomas John Tyrwhitt-Jones, 2nd Baronet (1793–1839), who married Eliza Walwyn Macnamara, the youngest daughter of John Macnamara, of Saint Kitts, West Indies, in 1821.
- Charles Tyrwhitt-Jones (1801–1876), who married Emily Halliday, daughter of Adm. John Richard Delap Tollemache and Lady Elizabeth Stratford (a daughter of the 3rd Earl of Aldborough), in 1819.
- Harriet Emma Tyrwhitt-Jones (d. 1820), who married John Mytton in 1818.

== Death ==
He died on 26 November 1811 at his residence, Clarence Lodge near Roehampton, now in south-west London. He was succeeded by Sir Thomas John Tyrwhitt Jones, 2nd Baronet, MP for Bridgnorth and High Sheriff of Shropshire for 1816–1817.

=== Descendants ===
Through his son Thomas, he was a grandfather of Sir Henry Tyrwhitt, 3rd Baronet, a Lieutenant in the Rifle Brigade who married Emma Harriet Wilson, suo jure Baroness Berners.

Parliament of Great Britain
Preceded by Welbore Ellis; John Purling; Sir Thomas Rumbold; Gabriel Steward	Member of Parliament for Weymouth and Melcombe Regis; 1790–1791; With: Sir James Murray; Richard Vanden-Bempde-Johnstone; Andrew Stuart	Succeeded by Sir James Murray; Richard Vanden-Bempde-Johnstone; Andrew Stuart; Sir James Johnstone
Preceded by Richard Myddelton	Member of Parliament for Denbigh; 1797–1800	Succeeded by Parliament of the United Kingdom
Parliament of the United Kingdom
Preceded by Parliament of Great Britain	Member of Parliament for Denbigh; 1801–1802	Succeeded by Hon. Frederick West
Preceded by William Handcock	Member of Parliament for Athlone; 1803–1806	Succeeded by George Tierney
Preceded by Hon. Henry Grey Bennet; Hon. William Hill	Member of Parliament for Shrewsbury; 1807–1811; With: Hon. William Hill	Succeeded by Hon. William Hill; Hon. Henry Grey Bennet
Baronetage of the United Kingdom
New creation	Baronet (of Stanley Hall); 1808–1811	Succeeded by Thomas John Tyrwhitt Jones
