= Richard Johnston =

Richard Johnston may refer to:

== Politics ==
- Richard Johnston (died 1706), MP for Clogher (Parliament of Ireland constituency)
- Sir Richard Johnston, 1st Baronet (1743–1795), MP for Kilbeggan and Blessington
- Archibald D. Johnston (1940–2003), popularly known as Dick Johnston, provincial politician, Alberta, Canada
- Richard Johnston (Ontario politician) (born 1946), provincial politician, Ontario, Canada
- Ricky Johnston (born 1943), Australian politician

== Other ==
- Richard C. Johnston, U.S. Air Force general
- Richard F. Johnston (1925–2014), American ornithologist, academic and author
- Richard Johnston (composer) (1917–1997), Canadian composer, arts administrator, music critic, and music educator
- Richard Johnston (musician), American blues musician
- Richard Johnston (architect) (1759–1806), Irish architect and property developer
- Richard Johnston (rugby) (born 1980), Welsh rugby union and rugby league player
- Rich Johnston, comic book columnist
- Richard Malcolm Johnston (1822–1898), American writer and educator
- Dick Johnston (1863–1934), baseball player
- Dick Johnston (journalist) (1919–2008), Canadian sports journalist
- Ritchie Johnston (1931–2001), New Zealand Olympic cyclist

== See also ==
- Richard Johnstone (disambiguation)
- Richard Johnson (disambiguation)
