= 2004 V8 Supercars Grand Finale =

Motor race

(New South Wales) 2004 V8 Supercars Grand Finale
Event Information
- Round 13 of 13 in the 2004 V8 Supercar Championship Series
- Date: 3–5 December 2004
- Location: Eastern Creek, New South Wales
- Venue: Eastern Creek Raceway
- Weather: Fine

Results
Race 1
Distance	26 laps	100 km
Pole position	Marcos Ambrose; Stone Brothers Racing	1:32.4345
Winner	Marcos Ambrose; Stone Brothers Racing	41:45.8004
Race 2
Distance	39 laps	150 km
Winner	Marcos Ambrose; Stone Brothers Racing	01:03:10.4380
Race 3
Distance	39 laps	150 km
Winner	Marcos Ambrose; Stone Brothers Racing	01:04:31.8346
Round Results
First	Marcos Ambrose; Stone Brothers Racing	192 pts
Second	Paul Radisich; Triple Eight Race Engineering	174 pts
Third	Russell Ingall; Stone Brothers Racing	160 pts

The 2004 V8 Supercars Grand Finale (known for naming rights reasons as the 2004 BigPond Grand Finale) was the thirteenth and final round of the 2004 V8 Supercar Championship Series. It was held on the weekend of 3 to 5 December at the Eastern Creek International Raceway in Sydney, New South Wales.

Marcos Ambrose shrugged off a major practice crash to obliterate the competition throughout the weekend; taking pole position and winning every race throughout the weekend, with the fastest lap in each of them, to take overall round honours and clinched his second V8 Supercar championship in the first race after only having to finish 19th or better to do so. This made him the first back-to-back champion for the Ford brand in Australian Touring Car history since Dick Johnson in 1988 and 1989. Teammate Russell Ingall claimed third overall for the round, and with his championship rivals encountering tough weekends, was able to clinch second overall in the championship.

== Background ==
The event was held on the weekend of 3 to 5 December 2004. It was the 13th ATCC/V8 Supercar event to be held at Eastern Creek International Raceway, the second event to be held at the Sydney venue that year, and consisted of three 100 km races with compulsory pitstops each.

Marcos Ambrose entered the round as the championship leader. While Jason Bright and Greg Murphy were still in with a mathematical chance, Ambrose required a 19th-place finish in the first race to secure enough points to clinch the title.

=== Entry list ===
There were 35 drivers entered into the event. It featured mixture of vehicle models - one AU Ford Falcon, fifteen BA Falcon's, eighteen VY Commodore's, and one VX Commodore.

Garth Walden returned to the championship driving the sole AU Ford Falcon. Christian D'Agostin made his return to the series driving for John Faulkner Racing aboard the only VX Holden Commodore that weekend. Lee Holdsworth made his debut in the series driving for Robert Smith Racing aboard a VY Holden Commodore.

Rod Nash Racing debuted a brand-new VY Holden Commodore to be run by Alex Davison.

== Race report ==
=== Qualifying ===
Pos	No	Driver	Team	Vehicle	Time
1	2	(Australia) Mark Skaife	Holden Racing Team	Holden Commodore (VY)	1:31.7327
2	1	(Australia) Marcos Ambrose	Stone Brothers Racing	Ford Falcon (BA)	1:32.1841
3	22	(Australia) Todd Kelly	Holden Racing Team	Holden Commodore (VY)	1:32.6206
4	50	(Australia) Jason Bright	Paul Weel Racing	Holden Commodore (VY)	1:32.6686
5	23	(Australia) David Besnard	WPS Racing	Ford Falcon (BA)	1:32.6901
6	888	(Brazil) Max Wilson	Triple Eight Race Engineering	Ford Falcon (BA)	1:32.7007
7	6	(Australia) Craig Lowndes	Ford Performance Racing	Ford Falcon (BA)	1:32.7400
8	88	(New Zealand) Paul Radisich	Triple Eight Race Engineering	Ford Falcon (BA)	1:32.7988
9	34	(Australia) Garth Tander	Garry Rogers Motorsport	Holden Commodore (VY)	1:32.8125
10	98	(Australia) Russell Ingall	Stone Brothers Racing	Ford Falcon (BA)	1:32.8876
11	10	(Australia) Jason Bargwanna	Larkham Motorsport	Ford Falcon (BA)	1:32.8995
12	17	(Australia) Steven Johnson	Dick Johnson Racing	Ford Falcon (BA)	1:33.0055
13	29	(Australia) Paul Morris	Paul Morris Motorsport	Holden Commodore (VY)	1:33.0277
14	11	(New Zealand) Steven Richards	Perkins Engineering	Holden Commodore (VY)	1:33.0473
15	18	(Australia) Warren Luff	Dick Johnson Racing	Ford Falcon (BA)	1:33.1758
16	31	(Australia) Steven Ellery	Steven Ellery Racing	Ford Falcon (BA)	1:33.1765
17	3	(New Zealand) Jason Richards	Tasman Motorsport	Holden Commodore (VY)	1:33.3783
18	21	(Australia) Brad Jones	Brad Jones Racing	Ford Falcon (BA)	1:33.4190
19	33	(Australia) Cameron McConville	Garry Rogers Motorsport	Holden Commodore (VY)	1:33.4216
20	44	(New Zealand) Simon Wills	Team Dynamik	Holden Commodore (VY)	1:33.5182
21	15	(Australia) Rick Kelly	John Kelly Racing	Holden Commodore (VY)	1:33.5267
22	51	(New Zealand) Greg Murphy	John Kelly Racing	Holden Commodore (VY)	1:33.5724
23	5	(Australia) Glenn Seton	Ford Performance Racing	Ford Falcon (BA)	1:33.6160
24	20	(Australia) Mark Winterbottom	Larkham Motorsport	Ford Falcon (BA)	1:33.8560
25	12	(Australia) John Bowe	Brad Jones Racing	Ford Falcon (BA)	1:33.9321
26	8	(Australia) Paul Dumbrell	Perkins Engineering	Holden Commodore (VY)	1:33.9362
27	7	(Australia) Alex Davison	Rod Nash Racing	Holden Commodore (VY)	1:33.9882
28	48	(Australia) Owen Kelly	WPS Racing	Ford Falcon (BA)	1:34.1488
29	45	(Australia) Dale Brede	Team Dynamik	Holden Commodore (VY)	1:34.3090
30	75	(Australia) Anthony Tratt	Paul Little Racing	Holden Commodore (VY)	1:34.4987
31	14	(Australia) Lee Holdsworth	Robert Smith Racing	Holden Commodore (VY)	1:34.5383
32	16	(Australia) Paul Weel	Paul Weel Racing	Holden Commodore (VY)	1:35.1841
33	43	(Australia) Christian D'Agostin	John Faulkner Racing	Holden Commodore (VX)	1:35.7221
34	24	(Australia) Garth Walden	Walden Motorsport	Ford Falcon (AU)	1:36.2883
105% time - 1:36.3193
-	021	(New Zealand) Craig Baird	Team Kiwi Racing	Holden Commodore (VY)	no time

=== Top ten shootout ===
Pos	No	Driver	Team	Vehicle	Time
1	1	(Australia) Marcos Ambrose	Stone Brothers Racing	Ford Falcon (BA)	1:32.4345
2	2	(Australia) Mark Skaife	Holden Racing Team	Holden Commodore (VY)	1:32.8835
3	22	(Australia) Todd Kelly	Holden Racing Team	Holden Commodore (VY)	1:33.1843
4	6	(Australia) Craig Lowndes	Ford Performance Racing	Ford Falcon (BA)	1:33.6643
5	50	(Australia) Jason Bright	Paul Weel Racing	Holden Commodore (VY)	1:34.2743
6	98	(Australia) Russell Ingall	Stone Brothers Racing	Ford Falcon (BA)	1:34.3121
7	888	(Brazil) Max Wilson	Triple Eight Race Engineering	Ford Falcon (BA)	1:34.4234
8	88	(New Zealand) Paul Radisich	Triple Eight Race Engineering	Ford Falcon (BA)	1:34.4419
9	34	(Australia) Garth Tander	Garry Rogers Motorsport	Holden Commodore (VY)	1:34.6899
EXC	23	(Australia) David Besnard	WPS Racing	Ford Falcon (BA)	time excluded

=== Race 1 ===
Pos	No	Driver	Team	Car	Laps	Time/Retired	Grid
1	1	(Australia) Marcos Ambrose	Stone Brothers Racing	Ford Falcon (BA)	26	41:45.8004	1
2	6	(Australia) Craig Lowndes	Ford Performance Racing	Ford Falcon (BA)	26	+ 11.872	4
3	50	(Australia) Jason Bright	Paul Weel Racing	Holden Commodore (VY)	26	+ 12.604	5
4	23	(Australia) David Besnard	WPS Racing	Ford Falcon (BA)	26	+ 27.092	10
5	15	(Australia) Rick Kelly	John Kelly Racing	Holden Commodore (VY)	26	+ 30.334	21
6	88	(New Zealand) Paul Radisich	Triple Eight Race Engineering	Ford Falcon (BA)	26	+ 30.838	8
7	98	(Australia) Russell Ingall	Stone Brothers Racing	Ford Falcon (BA)	26	+ 31.300	6
8	11	(New Zealand) Steven Richards	Perkins Engineering	Holden Commodore (VY)	26	+ 31.679	14
9	17	(Australia) Steven Johnson	Dick Johnson Racing	Ford Falcon (BA)	26	+ 38.069	12
10	10	(Australia) Jason Bargwanna	Larkham Motorsport	Ford Falcon (BA)	26	+ 39.241	11
11	31	(Australia) Steven Ellery	Steven Ellery Racing	Ford Falcon (BA)	26	+ 40.539	16
12	33	(Australia) Cameron McConville	Garry Rogers Motorsport	Holden Commodore (VY)	26	+ 46.473	19
13	51	(New Zealand) Greg Murphy	John Kelly Racing	Holden Commodore (VY)	26	+ 50.090	22
14	5	(Australia) Glenn Seton	Ford Performance Racing	Ford Falcon (BA)	26	+ 50.844	23
15	18	(Australia) Warren Luff	Dick Johnson Racing	Ford Falcon (BA)	26	+ 51.447	15
16	8	(Australia) Paul Dumbrell	Perkins Engineering	Holden Commodore (VY)	26	+ 53.226	26
17	3	(New Zealand) Jason Richards	Tasman Motorsport	Holden Commodore (VY)	26	+ 53.742	17
18	2	(Australia) Mark Skaife	Holden Racing Team	Holden Commodore (VY)	26	+ 54.263	2
19	21	(Australia) Brad Jones	Brad Jones Racing	Ford Falcon (BA)	26	+ 58.231	18
20	75	(Australia) Anthony Tratt	Paul Little Racing	Holden Commodore (VY)	26	+ 58.593	30
21	12	(Australia) John Bowe	Brad Jones Racing	Ford Falcon (BA)	26	+ 1:03.379	25
22	888	(Australia) Max Wilson	Triple Eight Race Engineering	Ford Falcon (BA)	26	+ 1:03.619	7
23	7	(Australia) Alex Davison	Rod Nash Racing	Holden Commodore (VY)	26	+ 1:12.316	27
24	14	(Australia) Lee Holdsworth	Robert Smith Racing	Holden Commodore (VY)	26	+ 1:12.506	31
25	45	(Australia) Dale Brede	Team Dynamik	Holden Commodore (VY)	26	+ 1:27.710	29
26	44	(New Zealand) Simon Wills	Team Dynamik	Holden Commodore (VY)	25	+ 1 lap	20
27	22	(Australia) Todd Kelly	Holden Racing Team	Holden Commodore (VY)	25	+ 1 lap	3
28	20	(Australia) Mark Winterbottom	Larkham Motorsport	Ford Falcon (BA)	24	+ 2 laps	24
29	29	(Australia) Paul Morris	Paul Morris Motorsport	Holden Commodore (VY)	22	+ 4 laps	13
Ret	48	(Australia) Owen Kelly	WPS Racing	Ford Falcon (BA)	21	Retired	28
Ret	24	(Australia) Garth Walden	Walden Motorsport	Ford Falcon (AU)	2	Retired	34
Ret	021	(New Zealand) Craig Baird	Team Kiwi Racing	Holden Commodore (VY)	1	Engine	35
Ret	34	(Australia) Garth Tander	Garry Rogers Motorsport	Holden Commodore (VY)	0	Driveline	9
Ret	43	(Australia) Christian D'Agostin	John Faulkner Racing	Holden Commodore (VX)	0	Mechanical	33
DNS	16	(Australia) Paul Weel	Paul Weel Racing	Holden Commodore (VY)		Did not start	
Fastest Lap: Marcos Ambrose (Stone Brothers Racing) - 1:33.4044 on lap 2

=== Race 2 ===
Pos	No	Driver	Team	Car	Laps	Time/Retired	Grid
1	1	(Australia) Marcos Ambrose	Stone Brothers Racing	Ford Falcon (BA)	39	01:03:10.4380	1
2	88	(New Zealand) Paul Radisich	Triple Eight Race Engineering	Ford Falcon (BA)	39	+ 19.252	6
3	6	(Australia) Craig Lowndes	Ford Performance Racing	Ford Falcon (BA)	39	+ 19.825	2
4	11	(New Zealand) Steven Richards	Perkins Engineering	Holden Commodore (VY)	39	+ 34.549	8
5	3	(New Zealand) Jason Richards	Tasman Motorsport	Holden Commodore (VY)	39	+ 35.302	17
6	17	(Australia) Steven Johnson	Dick Johnson Racing	Ford Falcon (BA)	39	+ 39.587	9
7	2	(Australia) Mark Skaife	Holden Racing Team	Holden Commodore (VY)	39	+ 40.421	18
8	888	(Australia) Max Wilson	Triple Eight Race Engineering	Ford Falcon (BA)	39	+ 44.587	22
9	98	(Australia) Russell Ingall	Stone Brothers Racing	Ford Falcon (BA)	39	+ 44.922	7
10	33	(Australia) Cameron McConville	Garry Rogers Motorsport	Holden Commodore (VY)	39	+ 52.238	12
11	10	(Australia) Jason Bargwanna	Larkham Motorsport	Ford Falcon (BA)	39	+ 54.871	10
12	22	(Australia) Todd Kelly	Holden Racing Team	Holden Commodore (VY)	39	+ 1:06.978	27
13	5	(Australia) Glenn Seton	Ford Performance Racing	Ford Falcon (BA)	39	+ 1:07.503	14
14	18	(Australia) Warren Luff	Dick Johnson Racing	Ford Falcon (BA)	39	+ 1:08.253	15
15	12	(Australia) John Bowe	Brad Jones Racing	Ford Falcon (BA)	39	+ 1:10.557	21
16	021	(New Zealand) Craig Baird	Team Kiwi Racing	Holden Commodore (VY)	39	+ 1:11.378	32
17	16	(Australia) Paul Weel	Paul Weel Racing	Holden Commodore (VY)	39	+ 1:19.075	35
18	34	(Australia) Garth Tander	Garry Rogers Motorsport	Holden Commodore (VY)	39	+ 1:20.883	33
19	21	(Australia) Brad Jones	Brad Jones Racing	Ford Falcon (BA)	39	+ 1:21.680	19
20	23	(Australia) David Besnard	WPS Racing	Ford Falcon (BA)	39	+ 1:31.137	4
21	50	(Australia) Jason Bright	Paul Weel Racing	Holden Commodore (VY)	39	+ 1:31.951	3
22	20	(Australia) Mark Winterbottom	Larkham Motorsport	Ford Falcon (BA)	39	+ 1:33.889	28
23	29	(Australia) Paul Morris	Paul Morris Motorsport	Holden Commodore (VY)	39	+ 1:38.057	29
24	51	(New Zealand) Greg Murphy	John Kelly Racing	Holden Commodore (VY)	39	+ 1:39.840	13
25	8	(Australia) Paul Dumbrell	Perkins Engineering	Holden Commodore (VY)	38	+ 1 lap	16
26	75	(Australia) Anthony Tratt	Paul Little Racing	Holden Commodore (VY)	38	+ 1 lap	20
27	7	(Australia) Alex Davison	Rod Nash Racing	Holden Commodore (VY)	38	+ 1 lap	23
28	48	(Australia) Owen Kelly	WPS Racing	Ford Falcon (BA)	38	+ 1 lap	30
29	14	(Australia) Lee Holdsworth	Robert Smith Racing	Holden Commodore (VY)	38	+ 1 lap	24
30	45	(Australia) Dale Brede	Team Dynamik	Holden Commodore (VY)	38	+ 1 lap	25
31	43	(Australia) Christian D'Agostin	John Faulkner Racing	Holden Commodore (VX)	38	+ 1 lap	34
32	24	(Australia) Garth Walden	Walden Motorsport	Ford Falcon (AU)	38	+ 1 lap	31
33	31	(Australia) Steven Ellery	Steven Ellery Racing	Ford Falcon (BA)	37	+ 2 laps	11
Ret	15	(Australia) Rick Kelly	John Kelly Racing	Holden Commodore (VY)	16	Steering	5
Ret	44	(New Zealand) Simon Wills	Team Dynamik	Holden Commodore (VY)	6	Retired	26
Fastest Lap: Marcos Ambrose (Stone Brothers Racing) - 1:33.7276 on lap 5

=== Race 3 ===
Pos	No	Driver	Team	Car	Laps	Time/Retired	Grid
1	1	(Australia) Marcos Ambrose	Stone Brothers Racing	Ford Falcon (BA)	39	01:04:31.8346	1
2	2	(Australia) Mark Skaife	Holden Racing Team	Holden Commodore (VY)	39	+ 26.489	7
3	98	(Australia) Russell Ingall	Stone Brothers Racing	Ford Falcon (BA)	39	+ 27.903	9
4	88	(New Zealand) Paul Radisich	Triple Eight Race Engineering	Ford Falcon (BA)	39	+ 31.716	2
5	22	(Australia) Todd Kelly	Holden Racing Team	Holden Commodore (VY)	39	+ 36.273	12
6	33	(Australia) Cameron McConville	Garry Rogers Motorsport	Holden Commodore (VY)	39	+ 36.870	10
7	29	(Australia) Paul Morris	Paul Morris Motorsport	Holden Commodore (VY)	39	+ 39.989	23
8	11	(New Zealand) Steven Richards	Perkins Engineering	Holden Commodore (VY)	39	+ 40.072	4
9	3	(New Zealand) Jason Richards	Tasman Motorsport	Holden Commodore (VY)	39	+ 40.487	5
10	34	(Australia) Garth Tander	Garry Rogers Motorsport	Holden Commodore (VY)	39	+ 41.147	18
11	888	(Australia) Max Wilson	Triple Eight Race Engineering	Ford Falcon (BA)	39	+ 42.604	8
12	12	(Australia) John Bowe	Brad Jones Racing	Ford Falcon (BA)	39	+ 46.816	15
13	17	(Australia) Steven Johnson	Dick Johnson Racing	Ford Falcon (BA)	39	+ 47.833	6
14	21	(Australia) Brad Jones	Brad Jones Racing	Ford Falcon (BA)	39	+ 48.405	19
15	15	(Australia) Rick Kelly	John Kelly Racing	Holden Commodore (VY)	39	+ 50.086	34
16	10	(Australia) Jason Bargwanna	Larkham Motorsport	Ford Falcon (BA)	39	+ 53.324	11
17	021	(New Zealand) Craig Baird	Team Kiwi Racing	Holden Commodore (VY)	39	+ 56.709	16
18	51	(New Zealand) Greg Murphy	John Kelly Racing	Holden Commodore (VY)	39	+ 57.829	24
19	44	(New Zealand) Simon Wills	Team Dynamik	Holden Commodore (VY)	39	+ 58.096	35
20	18	(Australia) Warren Luff	Dick Johnson Racing	Ford Falcon (BA)	39	+ 1:01.188	14
21	23	(Australia) David Besnard	WPS Racing	Ford Falcon (BA)	39	+ 1:06.284	20
22	5	(Australia) Glenn Seton	Ford Performance Racing	Ford Falcon (BA)	39	+ 1:07.984	13
23	50	(Australia) Jason Bright	Paul Weel Racing	Holden Commodore (VY)	39	+ 1:09.388	21
24	8	(Australia) Paul Dumbrell	Perkins Engineering	Holden Commodore (VY)	39	+ 1:11.001	25
25	75	(Australia) Anthony Tratt	Paul Little Racing	Holden Commodore (VY)	39	+ 1:11.329	26
27	7	(Australia) Alex Davison	Rod Nash Racing	Holden Commodore (VY)	39	+ 1:13.812	27
28	31	(Australia) Steven Ellery	Steven Ellery Racing	Ford Falcon (BA)	39	+ 1:15.596	33
29	14	(Australia) Lee Holdsworth	Robert Smith Racing	Holden Commodore (VY)	39	+ 1:24.739	29
30	45	(Australia) Dale Brede	Team Dynamik	Holden Commodore (VY)	39	+ 1:24.915	30
31	48	(Australia) Owen Kelly	WPS Racing	Ford Falcon (BA)	38	+ 1 lap	28
32	24	(Australia) Garth Walden	Walden Motorsport	Ford Falcon (AU)	38	+ 1 lap	32
33	20	(Australia) Mark Winterbottom	Larkham Motorsport	Ford Falcon (BA)	37	+ 2 laps	22
Ret	6	(Australia) Craig Lowndes	Ford Performance Racing	Ford Falcon (BA)	33	Retired	3
Ret	43	(Australia) Christian D'Agostin	John Faulkner Racing	Holden Commodore (VX)	9	Retired	31
Fastest Lap: Marcos Ambrose (Stone Brothers Racing) - 1:33.8759 on lap 13

== Championship standings ==
Pos.	No	Driver	Team	Pts
1	1	(Australia) Marcos Ambrose	Stone Brothers Racing	2174
2	98	(Australia) Russell Ingall	Stone Brothers Racing	1936
3	50	(Australia) Jason Bright	Paul Weel Racing	1920
4	51	(New Zealand) Greg Murphy	John Kelly Racing	1913
5	11	(New Zealand) Steven Richards	Perkins Engineering	1819
