= Sir James Johnstone, 4th Baronet =

British Army officer & politician (1726-1794)

Sir James Johnstone, 4th Baronet (23 January 1726 – 3 September 1794) was a Scottish officer in the British Army and then a politician. He sat in the House of Commons of Great Britain for all but one of the years 1784 to 1794.

== Family ==
Sir James was the son of Sir James Johnstone, 3rd Baronet and his wife Barbara, daughter of Alexander Murray, 4th Lord Elibank. In about 1759 he married Louisa Maria Elizabeth Colclough, the widow of Rev. John Meyrick, vicar of Edwinstowe, East Retford, Nottinghamshire. They had no children.

== Military career ==
He joined the marines in 1748 as a Second Lieutenant, and rose to the rank of Lieutenant-Colonel in 1772.

== Political career ==
Johnstone first tried to enter Parliament at the 1774 general election, when he began canvassing Dumfries Burghs, where the interest of the 3rd Duke of Queensberry was dominant. However, he made little progress and withdrew in favour of Alexander Fergusson of Craigdarroch, who was also unsuccessful. Queensberry's candidate William Douglas took the seat.

Johnstone tried again at the 1784 general election. The 4th Duke of Queensberry lived in England and was unpopular in the area, and Johnstone won the seat in a 4-way contest, with the support of two of the five burghs.

He took an independent line in Parliament, voting unpredictably. He supported Parliamentary reform and abolition of the slave trade, opposed the penal laws, and protested the tax burden on the poor. He supported the impeachment of Warren Hastings and of Elijah Impey, proclaiming in Impey's case that: "We have beheaded a King, we have hanged a peer, we have shot an admiral, we are now trying a governor-general, and I can see no reason why we should not put on his trial a judge and a chief justice".

His independence was less appreciated in Scotland, where he denounced the Scottish legal system, and twice opposed reform of Scottish seats despite petitions in favour of reform from the Dumfries Burghs. At the 1790 general election, he faced a strong challenge from Queensberry's interest, who spent over £8,000, while Johnstone spent over £12,000 (equivalent to £1.56 million in 2025). Corruption was rampant, and despite out-spending his opponent, Johnstone won only 2 of the five burghs.

However Johnstone's younger brother William had inherited a large fortune from his wife's family. He became one of the richest commoners in the empire and changed his name to William Pulteney. In 1790 he bought control of the four-seat borough of Weymouth and Melcombe Regis, adding to his interest in other boroughs.

To provide a seat for James, William asked Thomas Tyrwhitt Jones to vacate his seat at Weymouth, and at a by-election in 1791 James was returned in his place. He held the seat until his death, when William Pulteney succeeded to the baronetcy.

Parliament of Great Britain
Preceded by Sir Robert Herries	Member of Parliament for Dumfries Burghs; 1784–1790	Succeeded by Patrick Miller
Preceded by Sir Richard Vanden-Bempde-Johnstone, Bt; Sir James Murray Pulteney, Bt; Andrew Stuart; Thomas Tyrwhitt Jones	Member of Parliament for Weymouth & Melcombe Regis; 1791–1794; With: Andrew Stuart; Sir James Murray Pulteney, Bt; Sir Richard Vanden-Bempde-Johnstone, Bt	Succeeded by Sir Richard Vanden-Bempde-Johnstone, Bt; Sir James Murray Pulteney, Bt; Andrew Stuart; Gabriel Tucker Steward
Baronetage of Nova Scotia
Preceded by William Johnstone	Baronet (of Westerhall); 1772–1794	Succeeded by William Pulteney
