= Powder flask =

Small container for gunpowder

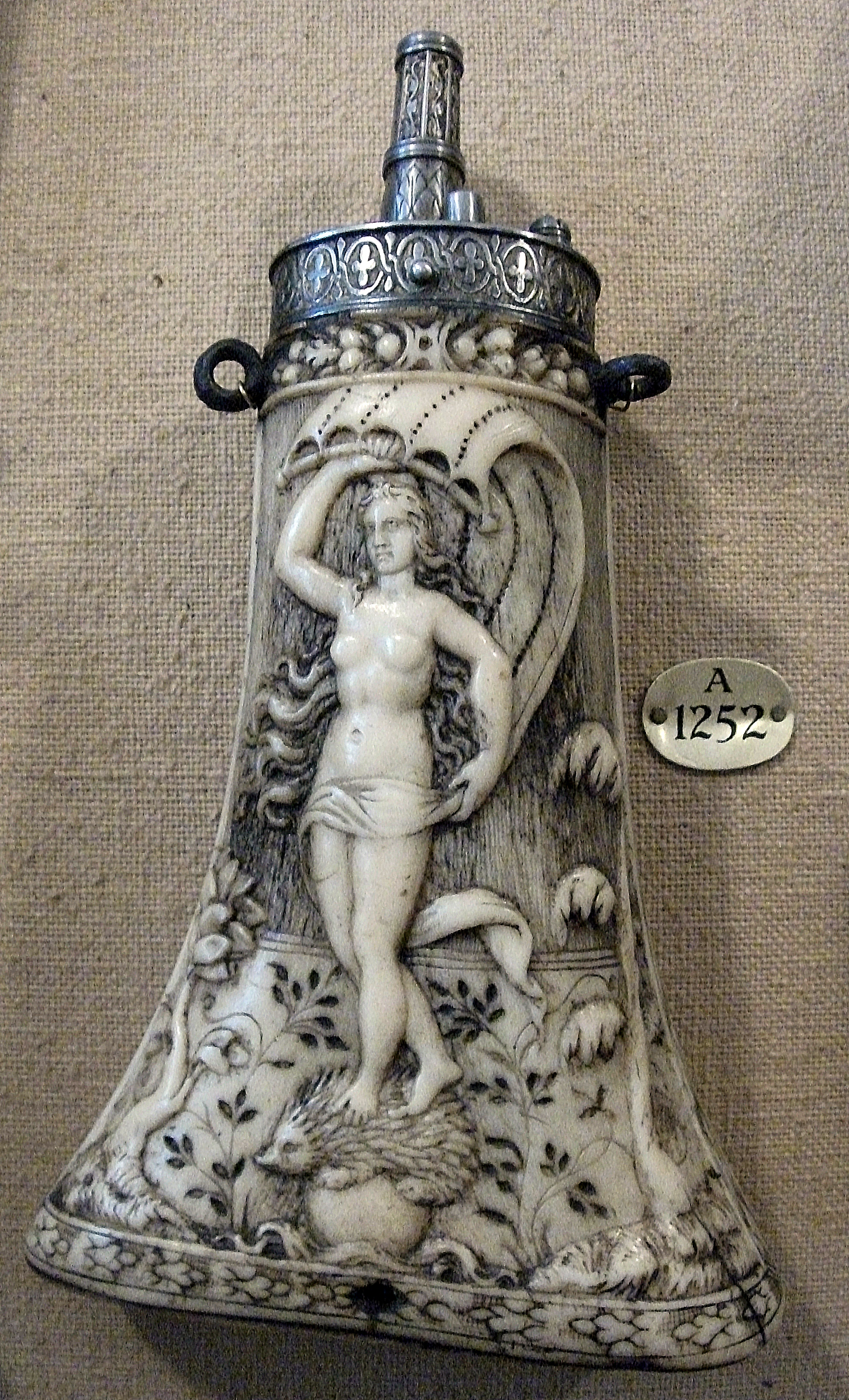
German antler and steel flask, c. 1570; the goddess Fortuna stands on a hedgehog upon a globe.

A powder flask is a small container for gunpowder, which was an essential part of shooting equipment with muzzle-loading guns, before pre-made paper cartridges became standard in the 19th century. They range from very elaborately decorated works of art to early forms of consumer packaging, and are widely collected. Many were standardized military issue, but the most decorative were generally used for sporting shooting.

Although the term powder horn is sometimes used for any kind of powder flask, it is strictly a sub-category of flask made from a hollowed bovid horn. Powder flasks were made in a great variety of materials and shapes, though ferrous metals that were prone to give off sparks when hit were usually avoided. Stag antler, which could be carved or engraved, was an especially common material, but wood and copper were common, and in India, ivory.

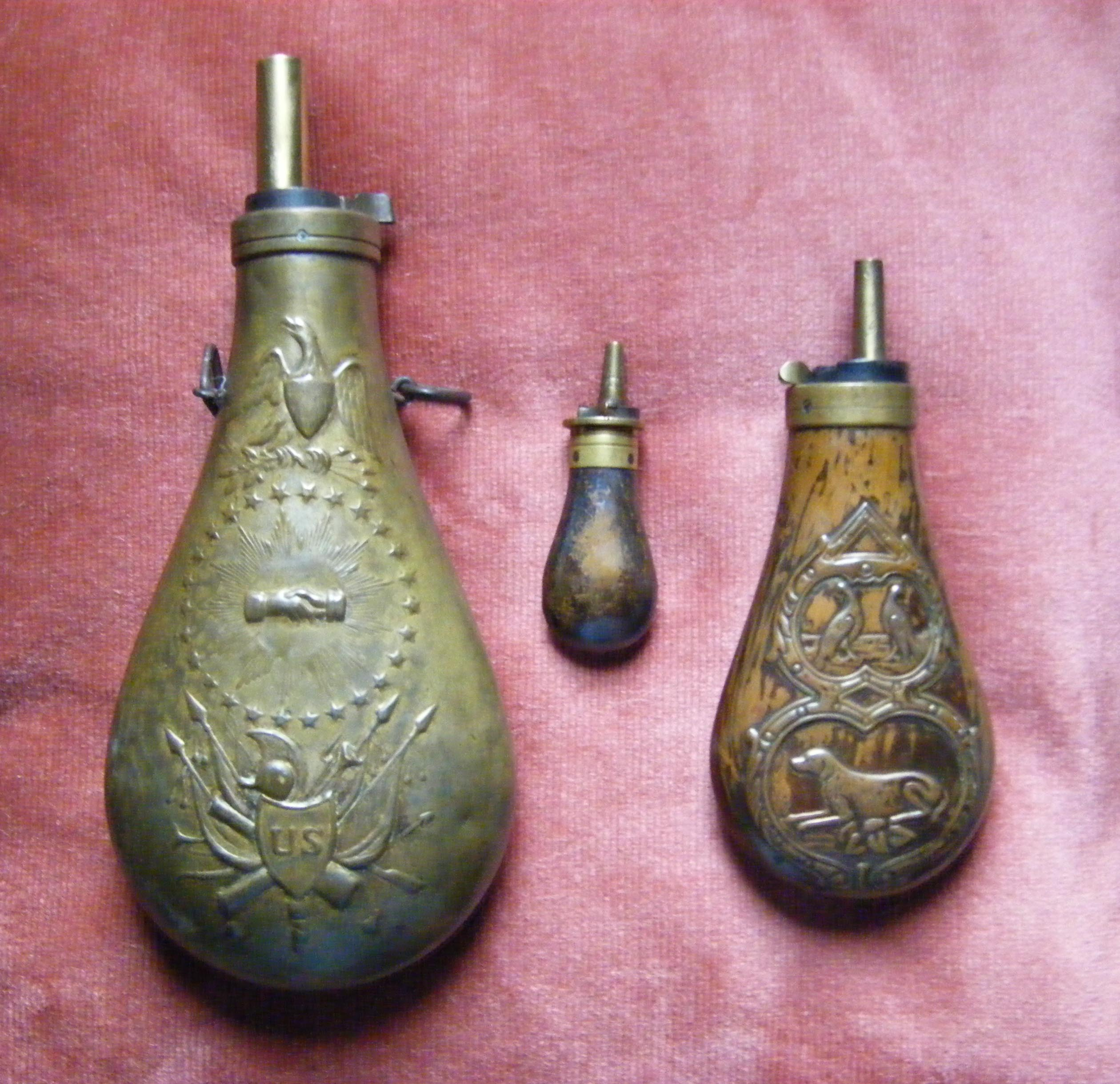
American 19th century: left for models by Colt, right for Remington

Many types of early guns required two different forms of gunpowder (such as a flintlock with finer priming powder for the pan, and a coarser standard powder for the main charge), necessitating two containers, a main flask and a smaller priming flask.

Apart from the horns, common shapes were the Y formed by the base of an antler (inverted), a usually flattened pear shape with a straight spout (poire-poudre or "powder pear" is a French term for these), a round flattened shape, and for larger flasks a triangle with concave rounded sides, which unlike the smaller flasks could be stood upright on a surface. Many designs (such as horn and antler types) have a wide sealed opening for filling, and a thin spout for dispensing. Various devices were used to load a precise amount of powder to dispense, as it was important not to load too much or too little powder, or the powder was dispensed into a powder measure or "charger" (these survive much less often). As early as c. 1600 a German flask had a silver spout with a "telescopic valve, adjustable for different sizes of powder charges".

== Use ==
Although forms of pre-packed paper cartridges go back to the Middle Ages, these were for several centuries made up by the shooter or a servant, rather than being mass-produced, requiring a container for the gunpowder, which came loose. Unlike modern cartridges, these were not inserted into the gun themselves, but were rather a pre-measured amount of powder stored in a paper wrapper, sometimes with the ball included as well. Loading the gun involved tearing open the package, emptying the powder into the muzzle and pan, inserting the ball with the paper doubling as wadding, and then ramming home the charge. This was somewhat faster and more convenient than measuring out a powder charge each time, especially in a combat situation. However, there was no large-scale manufacturing of these cartridges until the 19th century, and even then the benefits mostly lay with military use; the added cost made them less popular with civilian shooters until the advent of the self-contained metallic cartridge and the breech-loader.

While loading a muzzleloader, an important safety concern was that when reloading a muzzle-loading gun soon after a shot there might be small pieces of wadding burning in the muzzle, which would cause the new load of powder to ignite as a flash. So long as no part of the loader faced the end of the barrel this was not likely to lead to serious injury, but if a spark reached the main supply in the powder flask a dangerous, even fatal, explosion was likely. General Sir James Pulteney, 7th Baronet, was one such victim; he died in 1811 from complications after losing an eye when a powder flask accidentally exploded in his face in Norfolk. Charles Kickham, prominent in the Irish Republican Brotherhood, grew up largely deaf and almost blind as the result of an explosion when he was 13, in about 1840. Various precautions were taken in the design and use of powder flasks to prevent this from happening, and expensive examples from as early as the 16th century usually have springs to automatically close the dispensing spout (this is much less common with the cheaper horn type).

Modern manuals on muzzle-loading guns all say the flask should never be used to pour powder directly down the muzzle, to avoid dangerous overcharging and possible burst barrels, but from the English sporting press of the 18th and early 19th centuries, it is all too clear that this was then common practice, resulting in many accidents. Some YouTube videos demonstrating loading maintain the old traditions. Instead, the powder should be poured into an intermediate container known as a charger or powder measure. Sometimes, the cap to the spout represented the measure, especially for priming flasks. Sometimes, the spout itself was the measure, with a sliding device to shut off the supply at the base, as well as a cap. This type became the norm in the mid-19th century.

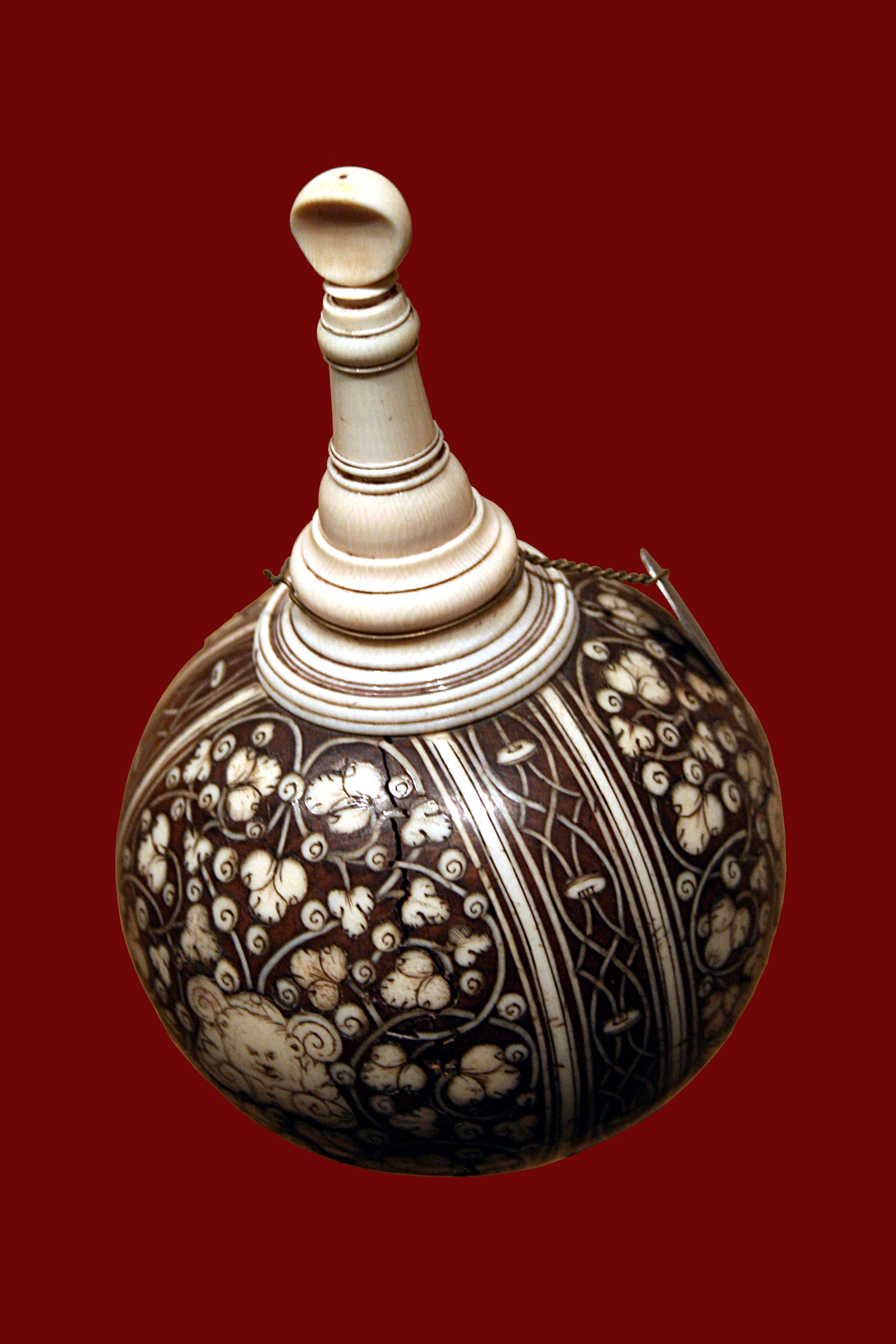
Priming flask, Germany (ca. 1600)

High-quality guns would often have come with a matching flask, chargers, and other accessories. Many flasks have small rings for a cord, which was slung around the neck to carry them, especially before large pockets on hunting clothes arrived in Europe in the 18th century. Some examples have original elaborate cords with knots and tassels.

During roughly the 18th century, paper cartridges became more and more popular, and a higher proportion of flasks made were the smaller priming variety, which were still required. It appears that the British Army in the Peninsular War, despite regulations specifying the issue of powder horns and priming flasks, found the former inferior in action to cartridges, with the measuring spout prone to get detached and lost, and informally switched to cartridges during the war. The powder flask was finally rendered obsolete by the spread of breech-loading guns and the innovations brought about by Hall, Sharps, Spencer, and the later development of self-contained cartridges that were developed and marketed successfully by Oliver Winchester, after which manufactured cartridges or bullets became standard. Powder flasks were also used for priming naval cannon; such a flask would be as large as, or even larger than, a main flask for a personal sidearm. The large, rectangular boxes from which the main muzzle charges for cannon were scooped are called powder boxes; these were used either when making up cartridges in advance, or loading loose powder when firing.

== Decoration ==
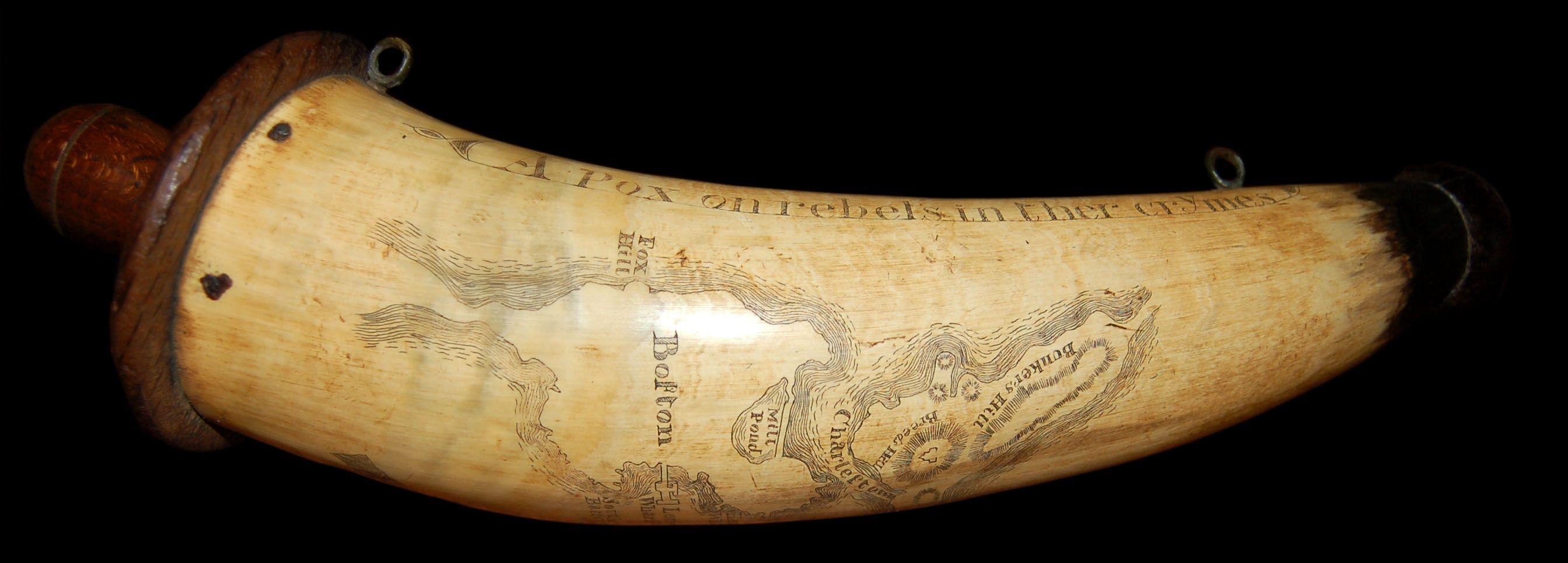
British soldier's powder horn, 1775, engraved with a map of Boston, Massachusetts and "A Pox on rebels in ther crymes"

Most of the vast numbers of flasks made in the gun-using parts of the world during the Early Modern period were probably relatively plain and functional, and have not been preserved. But those for the wealthy sportsman or soldier could have decoration of the highest quality, and many artisan-made horns have folk art engravings similar to skrimshaw. They are collected at various levels; early hand-made examples of high quality are expensive and may be found in local or military museums and those for the decorative arts, while 19th century mass-produced examples in metal are a relatively cheap type of antique (though not always as old as claimed) and widely collected.

=== Europe ===
Germany, in antler and other materials, and India, in ivory and even jade, are the sources of especially richly decorated luxury flasks. A number of German flasks from the 16th and early 17th centuries are very richly carved with a wide variety of scenes, such as the emblematic figure illustrated. Antler was used for decorating a range of objects associated with hunting, from buttons to gunstocks, knife handles and saddles decorated all over with carved slices of antler. The uniforms of the guards of German princes might include elaborate flasks, often decorated with heraldic designs.

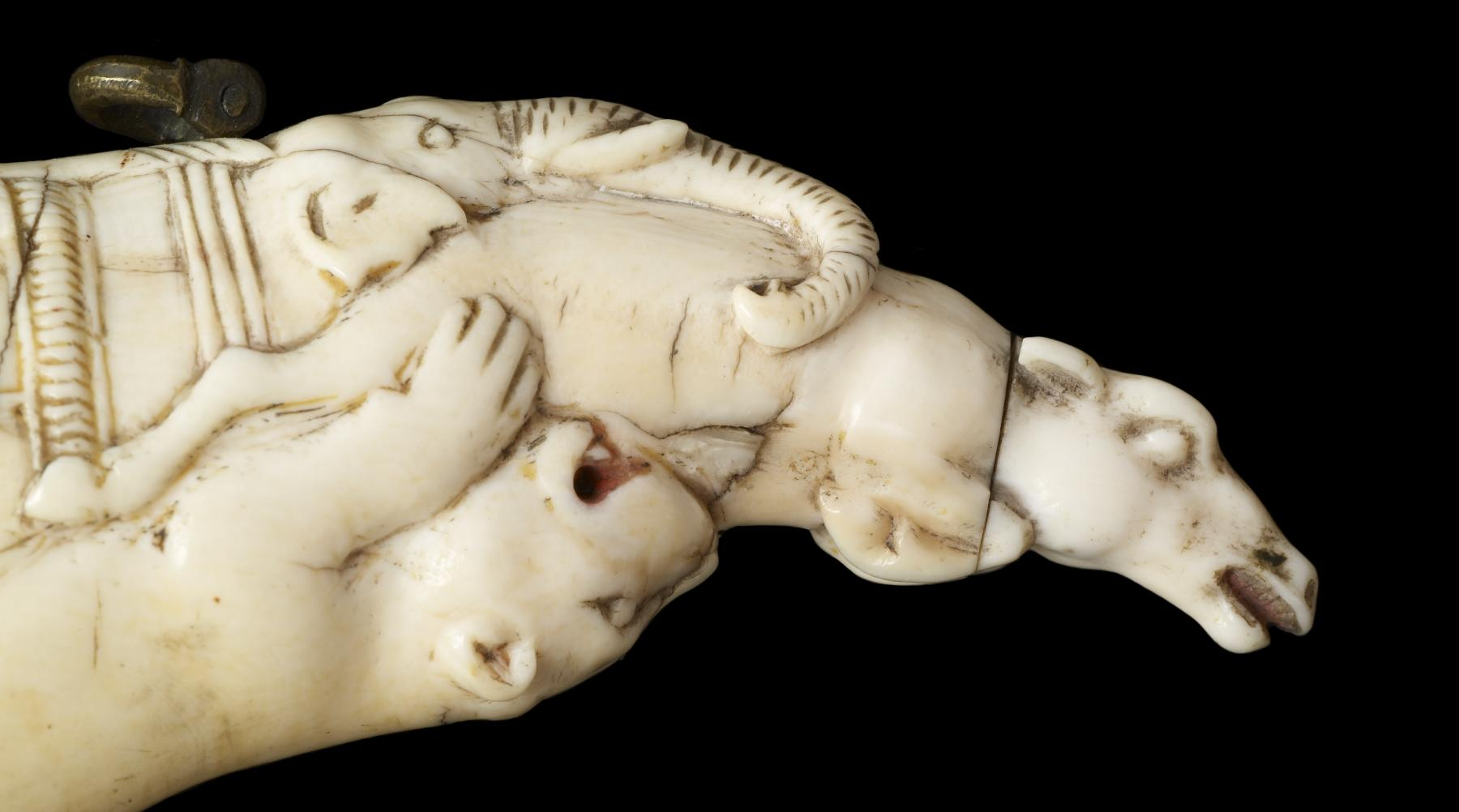
Detail of the "composite animal" tip of an 18th-century ivory Indian flask

By the 19th century, stamped metal flasks with a central design in low relief are more common, and standard types by particular manufacturers dominate the field, some produced by gun or powder manufacturers and carrying branding or advertising. The pear shape has become dominant for smaller flasks, which are presumably mostly kept in a pocket.

=== Asia ===
Ivory Indian flasks of the Mughal and post-Mughal periods, regarded as priming flasks, have a fish-like shape reflecting the tip of a tusk, and are often carved with animals (typically attacking each other) in high relief, with the bodies of the animals in the round at the narrow tip. The bodies of hunter and prey are closely and often illogically connected, forming what have been called "composite animal" forms, which have interested art historians. The Indian tradition of ivory carving (which was probably objectionable to Hindu patrons) was rather late-starting apparently diffusing from a number of centres including a school of carving developed in the Portuguese colony of Goa from the 16th century onwards. The flasks, from the 17th to early 19th centuries, have echoes of much older works in the Animal style especially associated with ancient Scythia, and an intermediate tradition of objects, now lost, in perishable materials such as (in India) wood has been proposed. There are also obvious links with miniatures from Deccan painting. Collectors may use the Indo-Persian term barut-dan for flasks from these areas.

Edo period Japanese flasks (kayaku-ire) were made in the materials and styles that were already highly developed in Japan for the decoration of small personal objects including flasks, often using lacquered wood, which was a very suitable material.

== Gallery ==
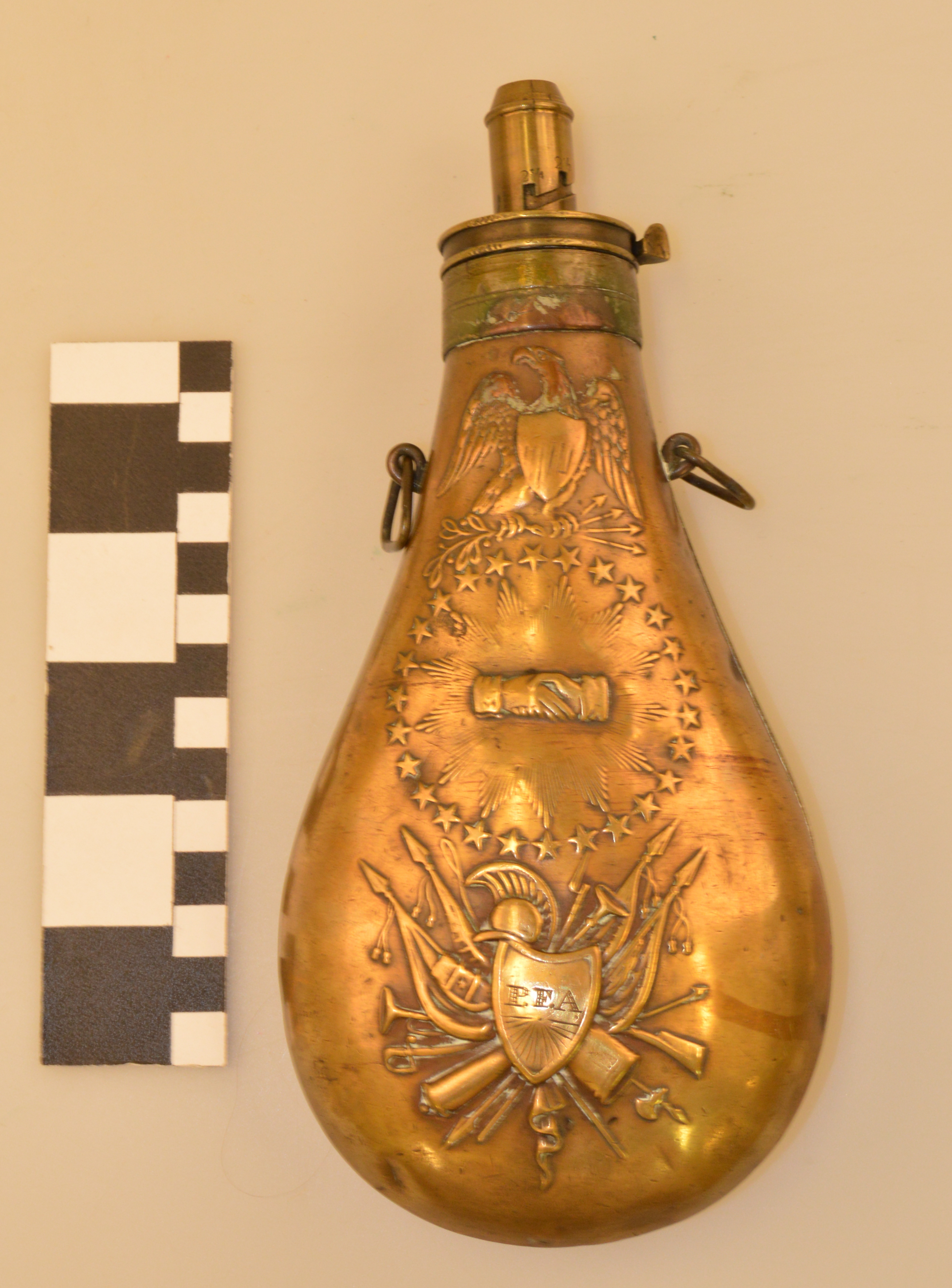
Peace Flask" Powder Flask by N.P. Ames. Missouri History Museum.

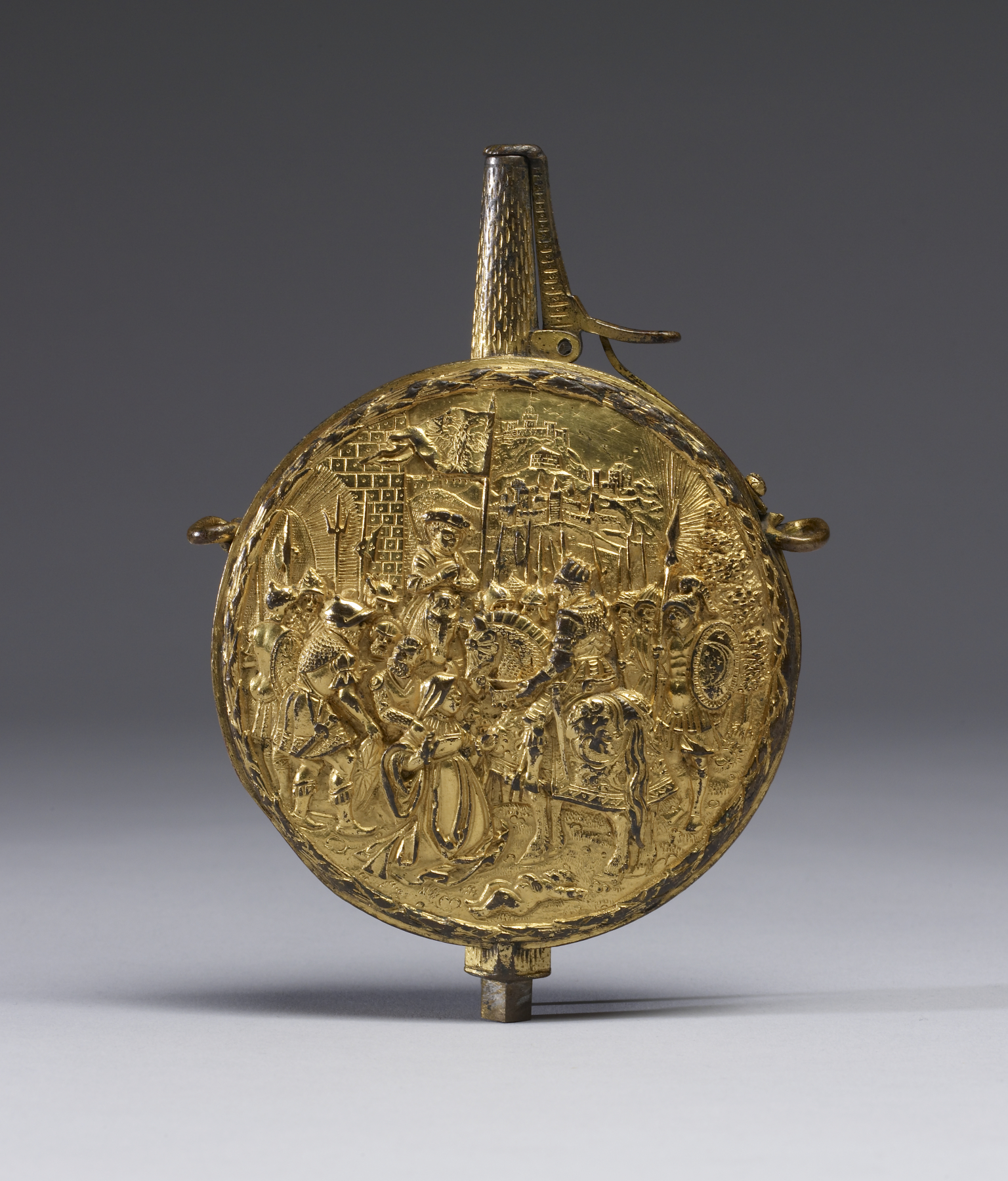
German gilded copper flask for priming powder with spring and The Justice of Trajan, 1530-1550

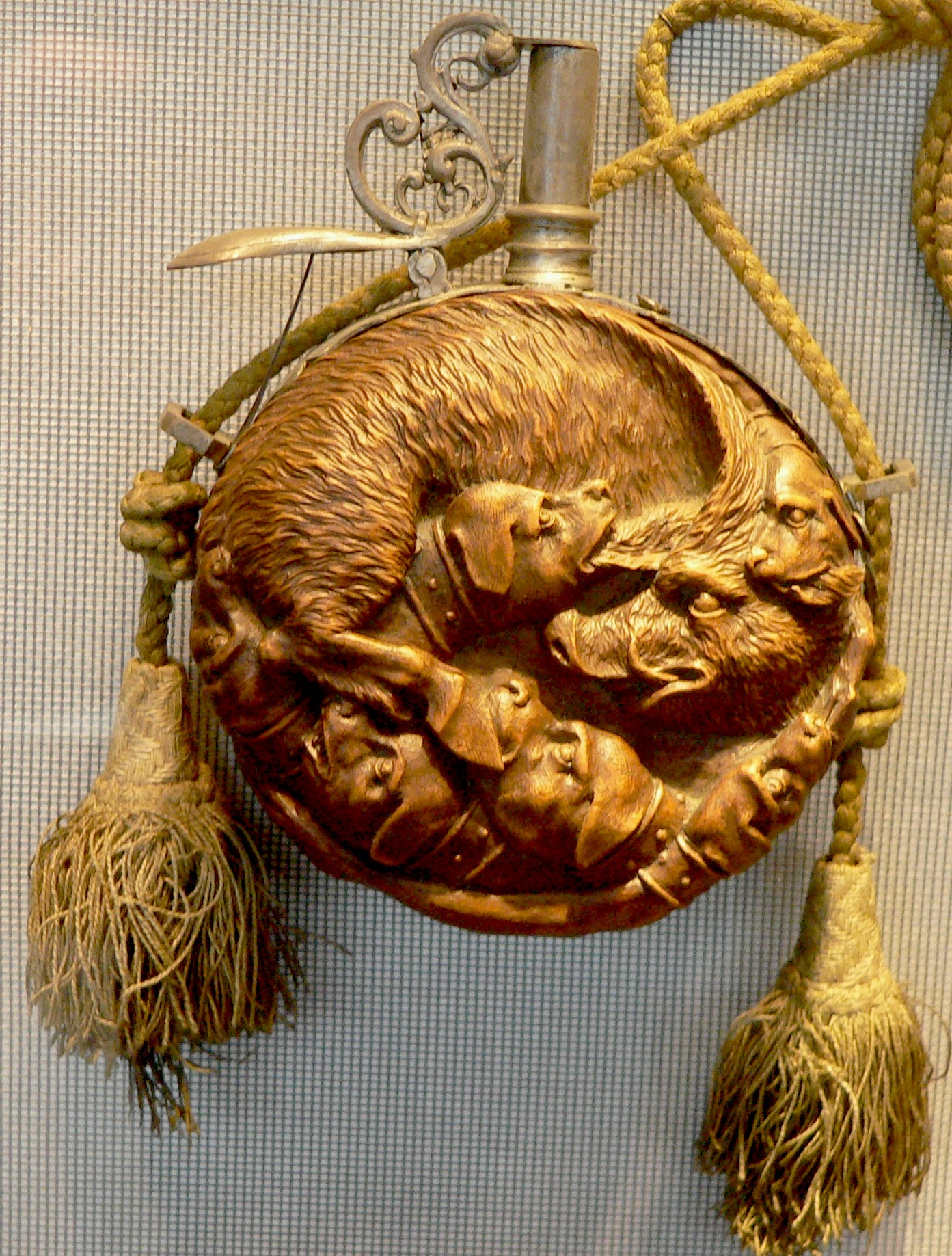
German 16th century flask with dogs attacking a boar, wood mounted with silver, and spring

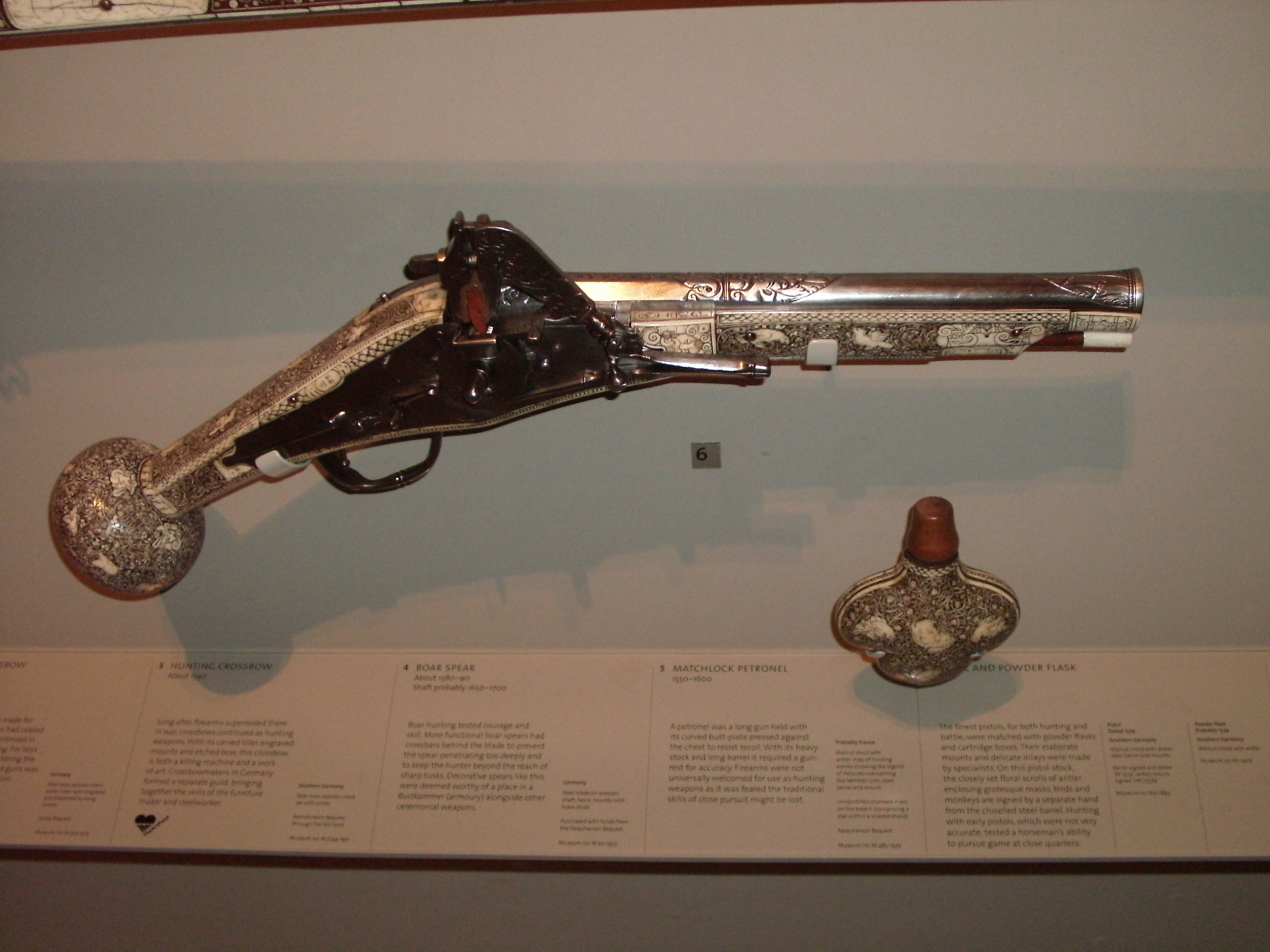
Matching pistol and flask, German, probably 1579, both decorated with finely carved antler inlay

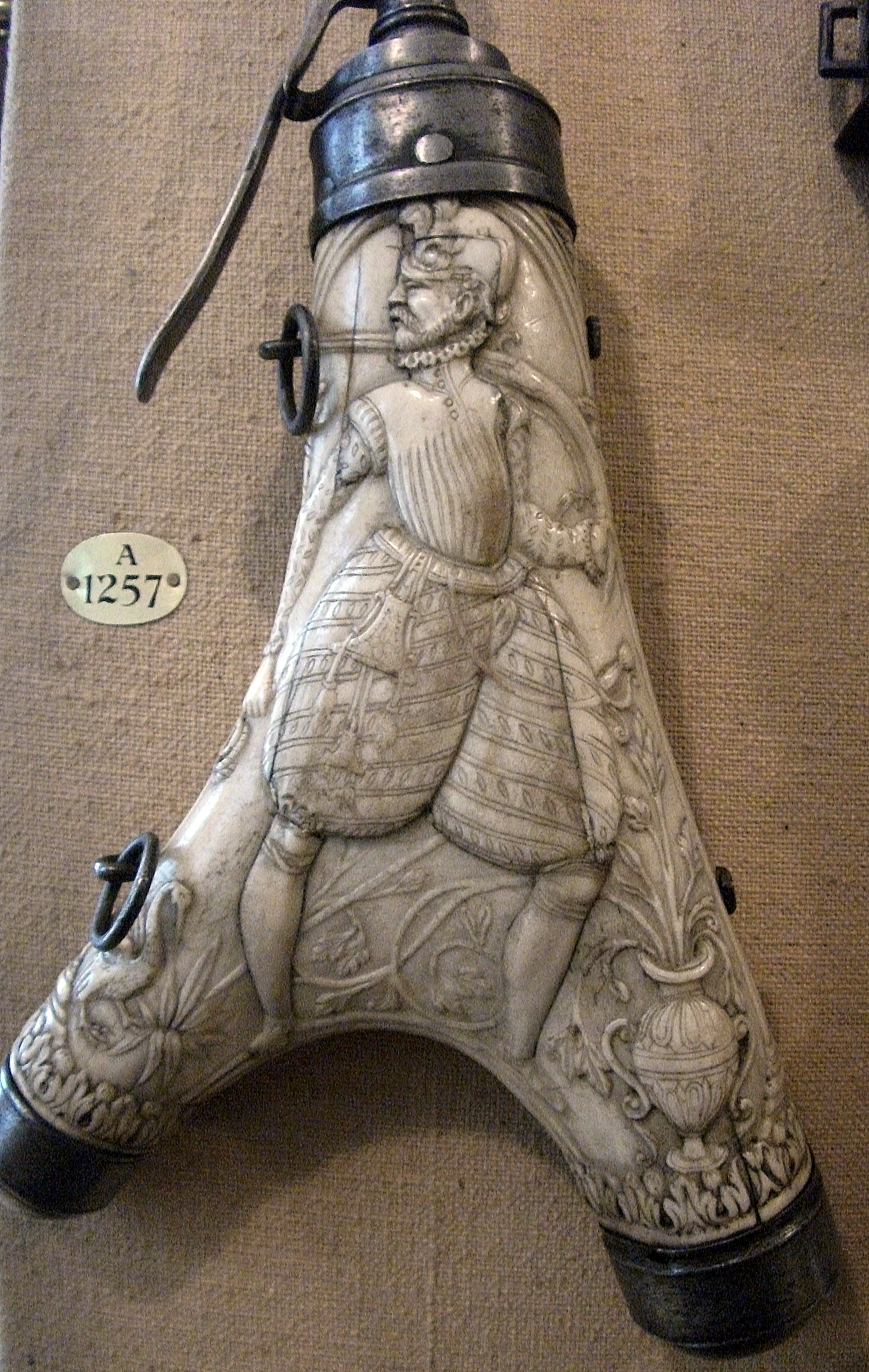
French, c. 1590, antler and steel. The figure carries a gun and a flask on his belt

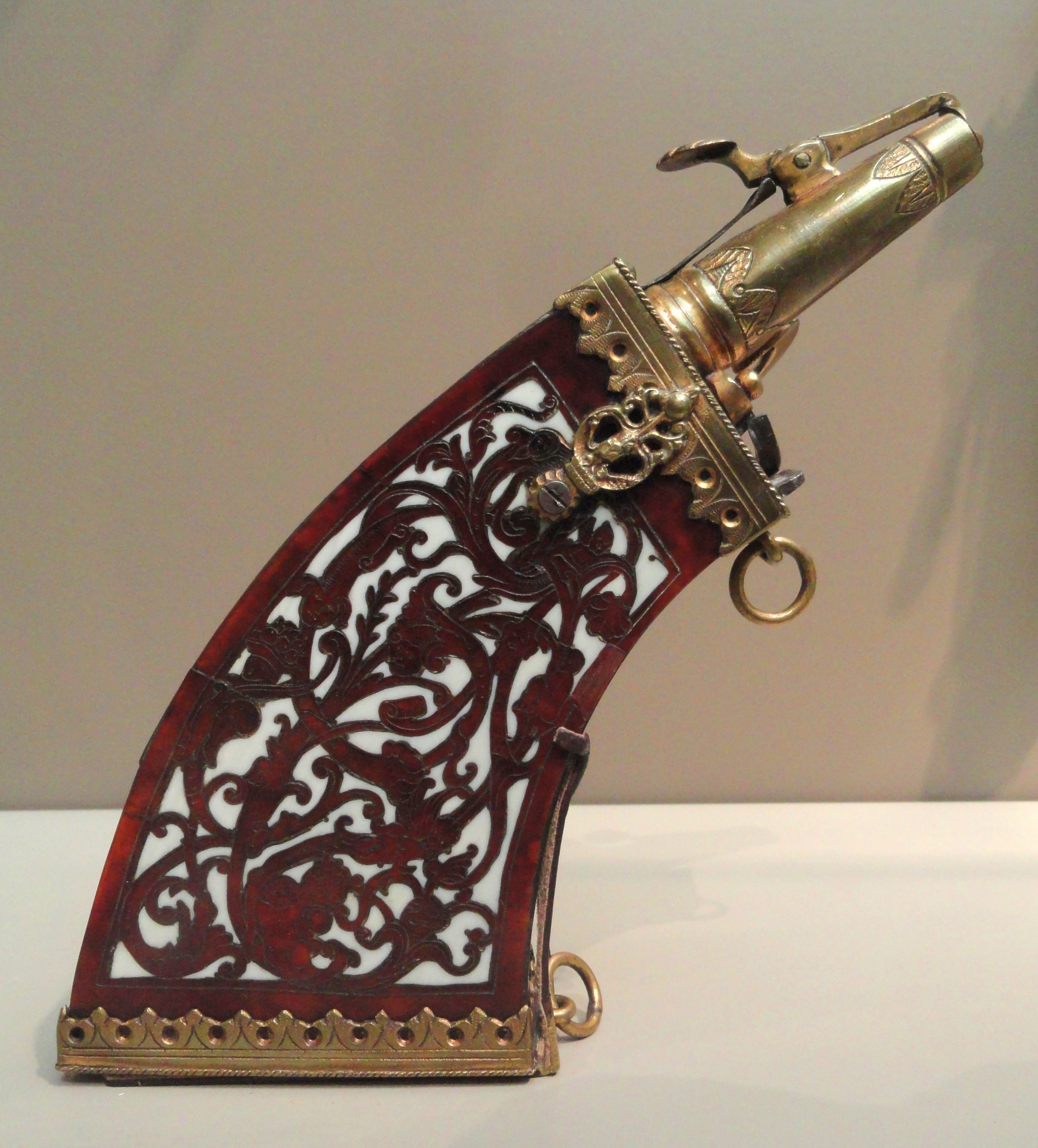
German, 1630–1640, wood with engraved tortoiseshell

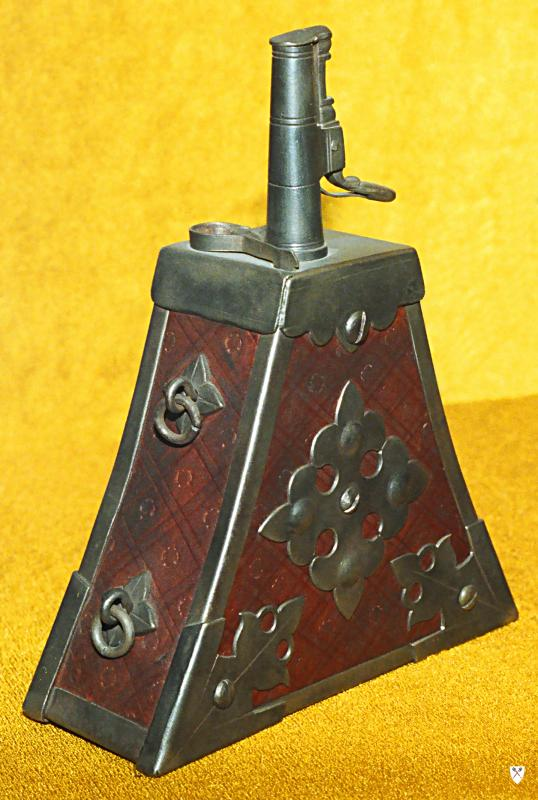
16th or 17th century priming flask, Russian (?)

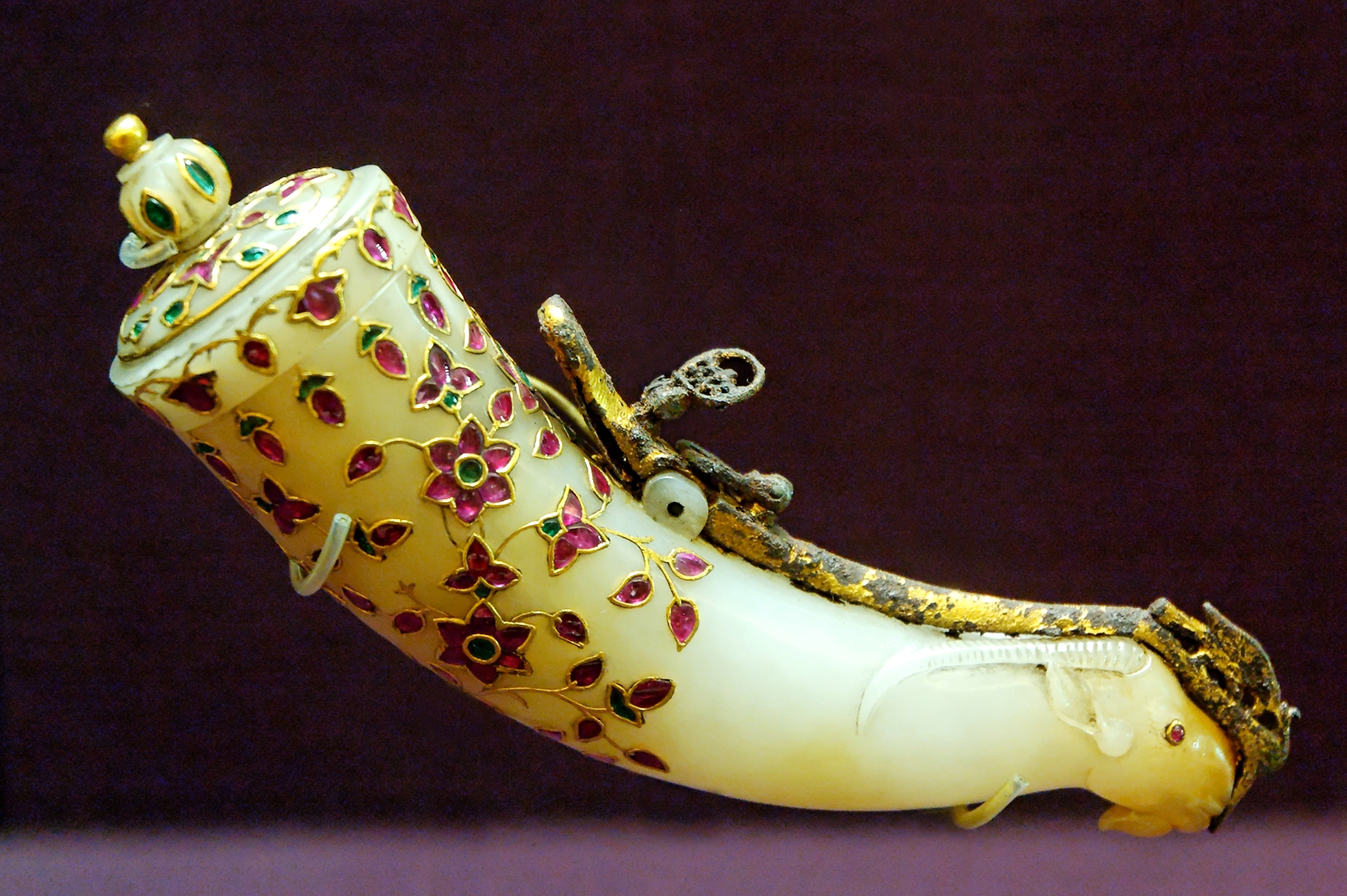
Mughal gem-encrusted jade flask, still with spring; 17th century

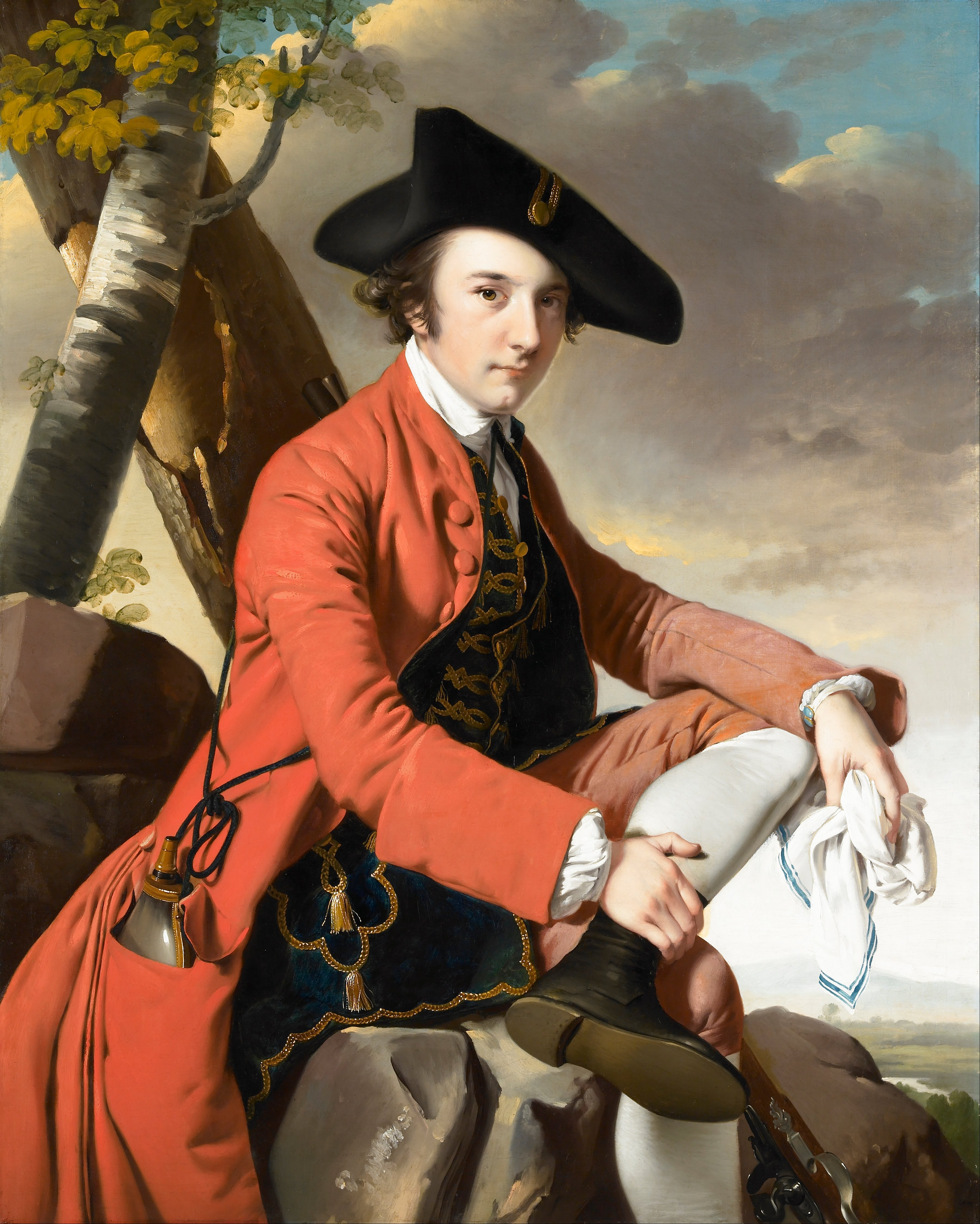
Joseph Wright of Derby, portrait of Fleetwood Hesketh, 1769. The flask in his pocket seems plain in design, as most probably were.

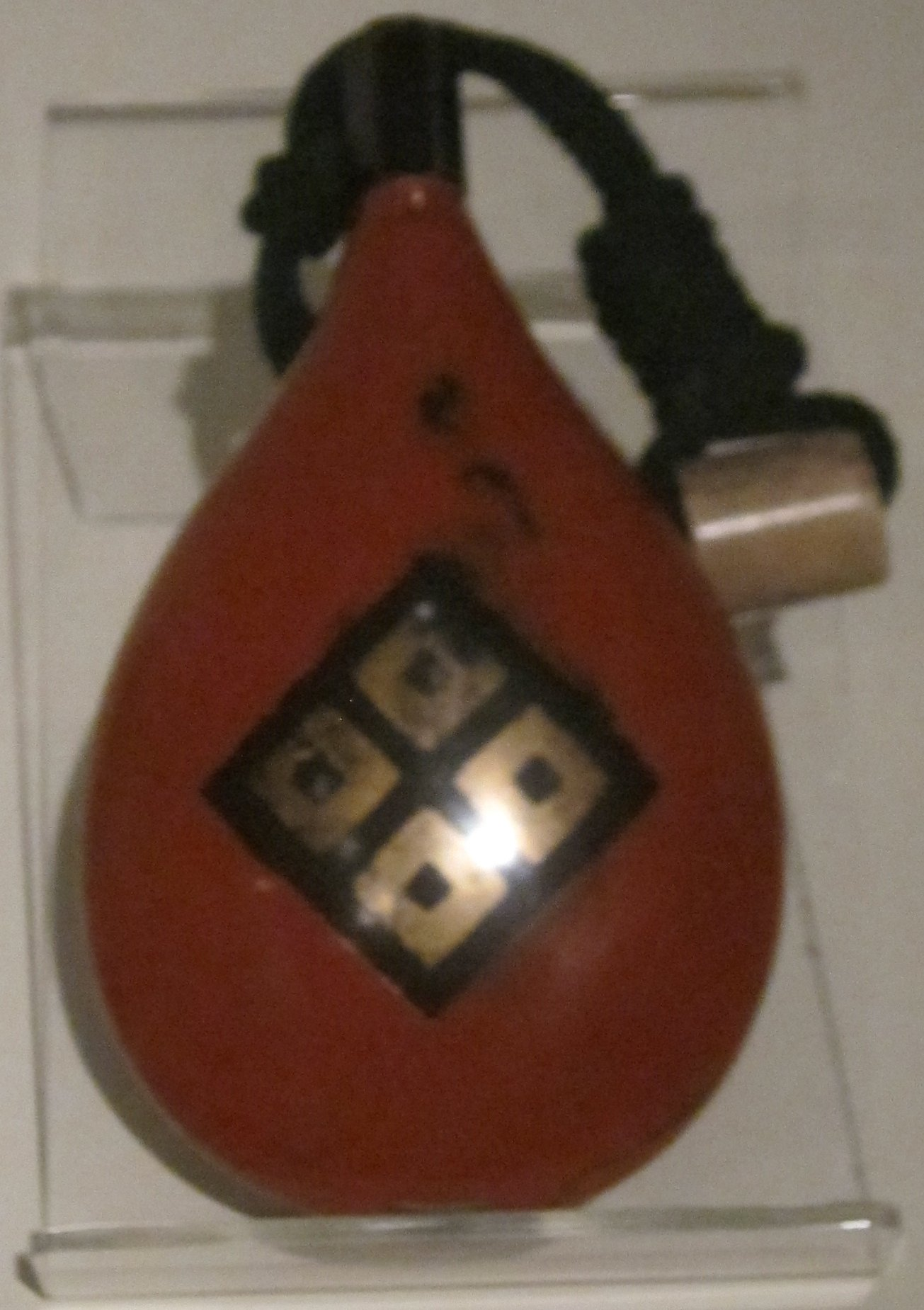
Japanese, 18th century, lacquered wood and antler

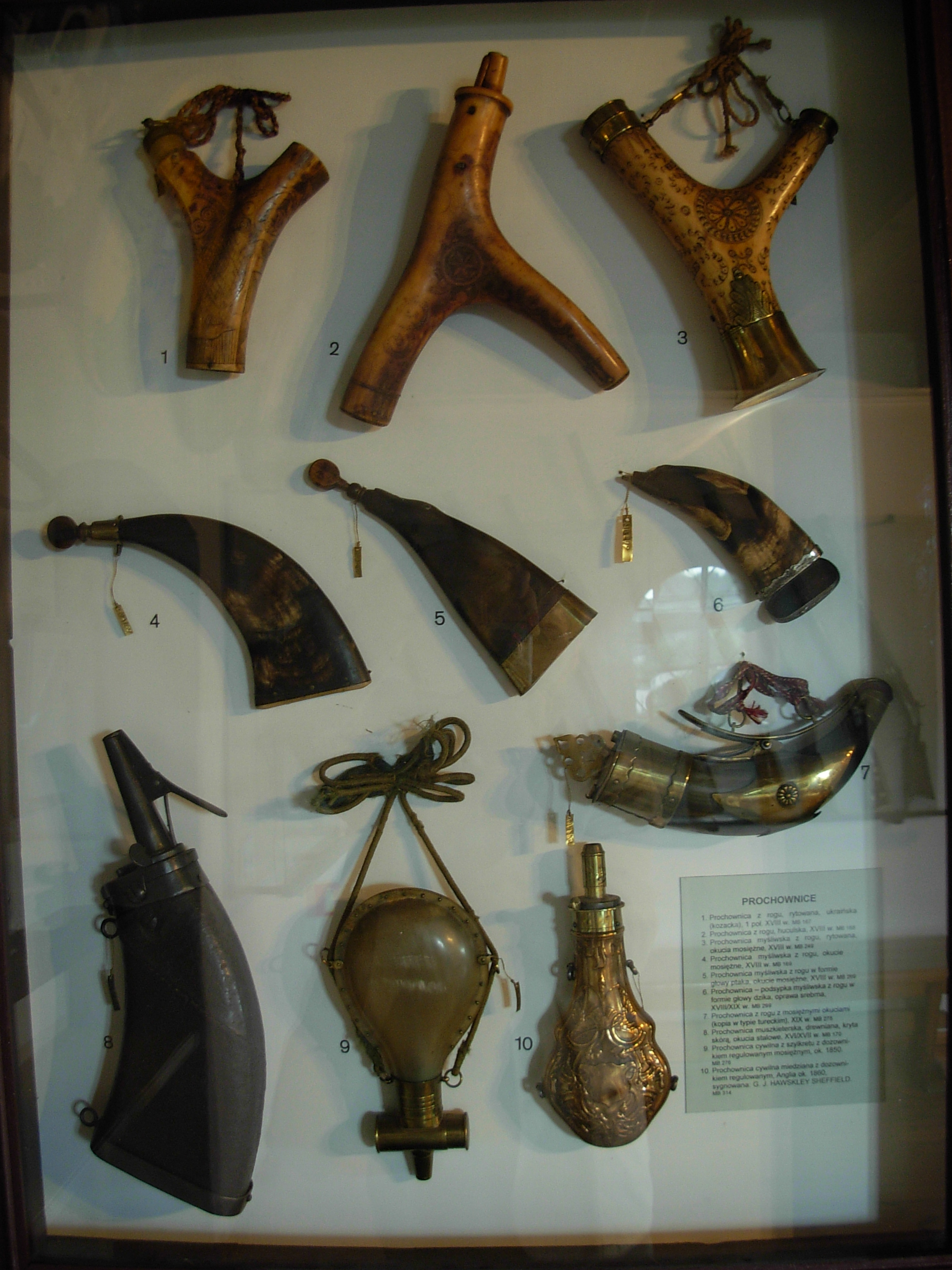
Assorted flasks in Poland, mostly 18th or 19th century

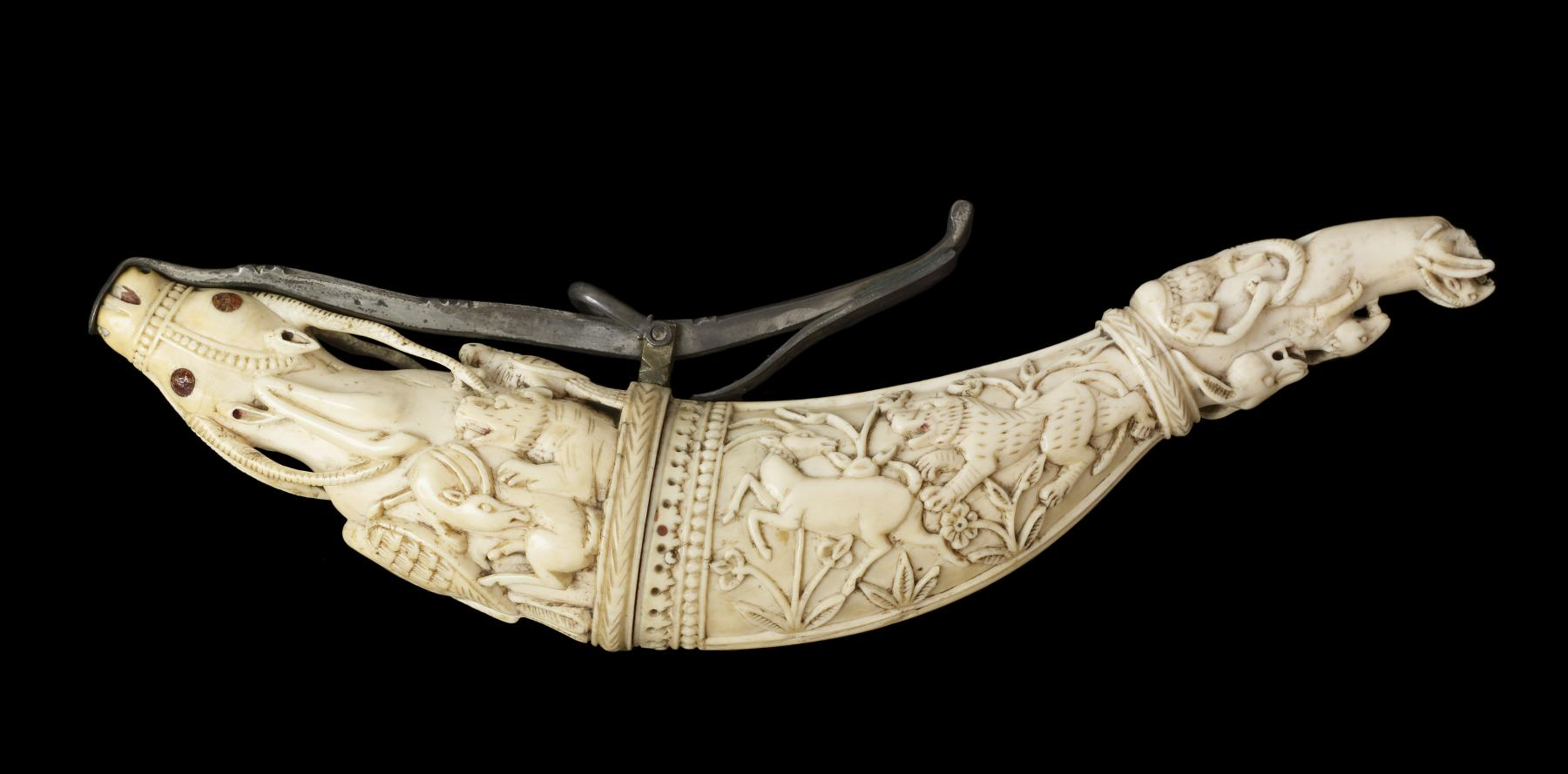
Indian flask in ivory with amber and steel spring device, 18th/19th century

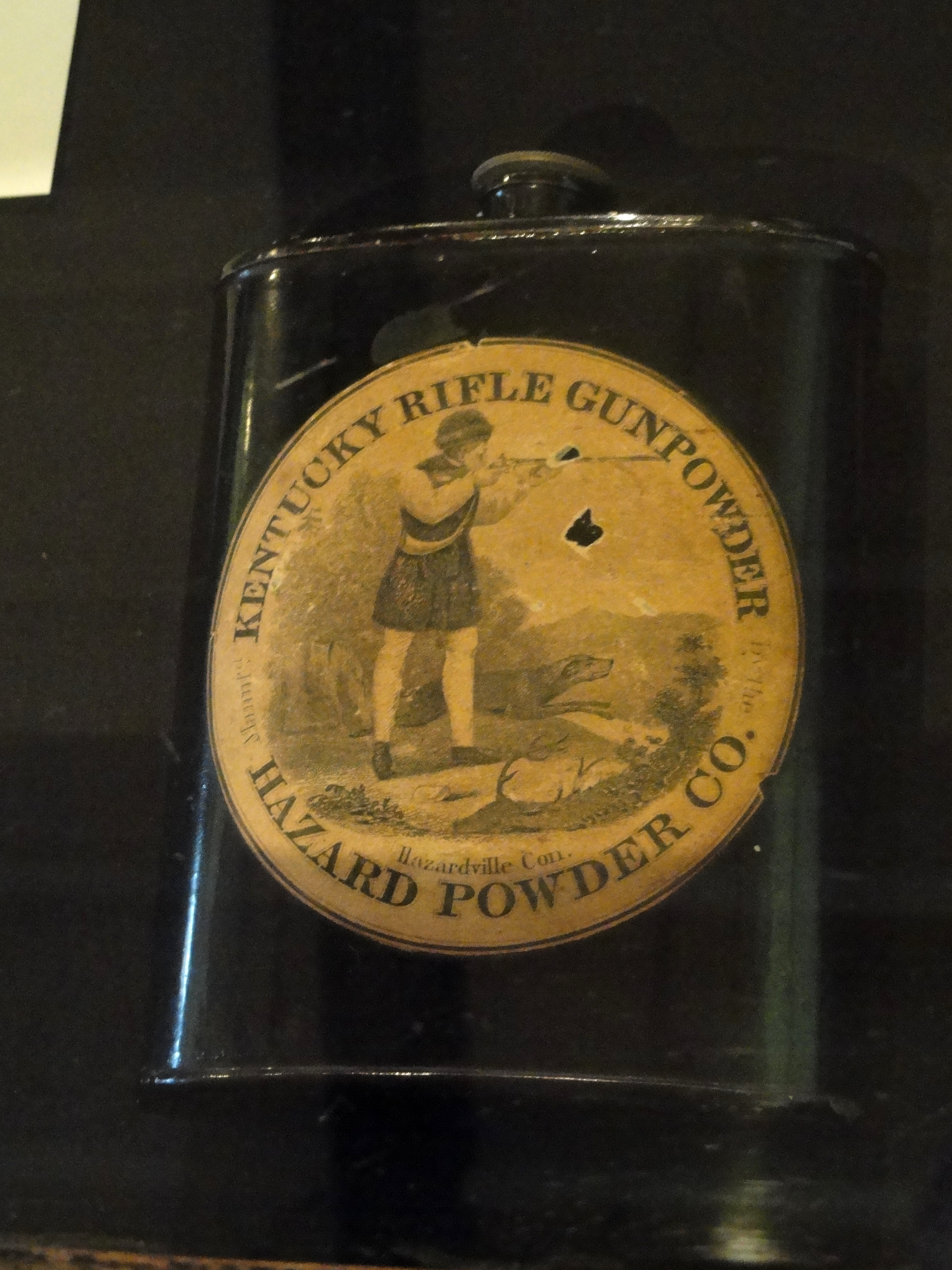
19th-century American manufacturer's metal flask

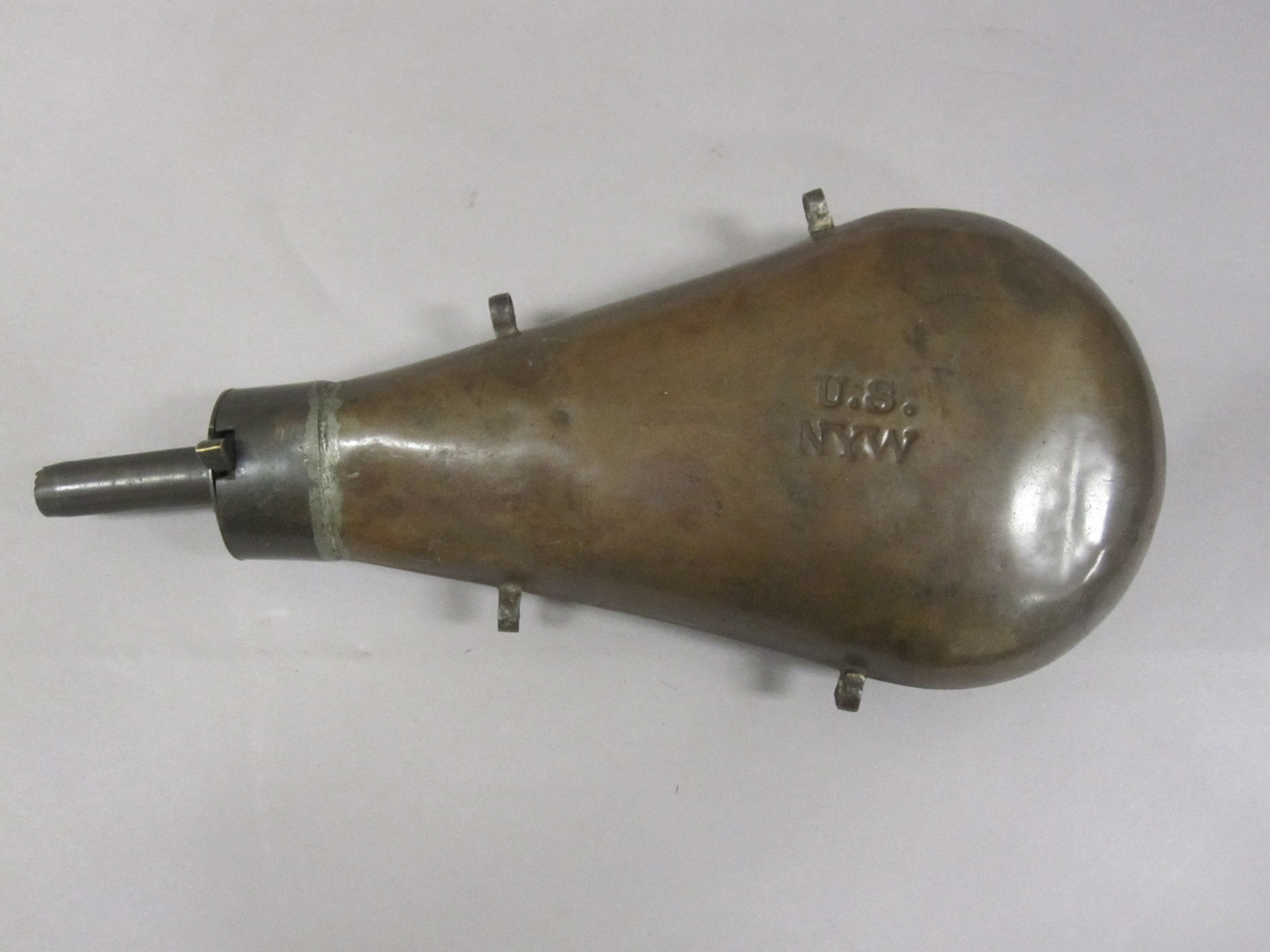
United States Navy flask for priming naval cannon; after 1842

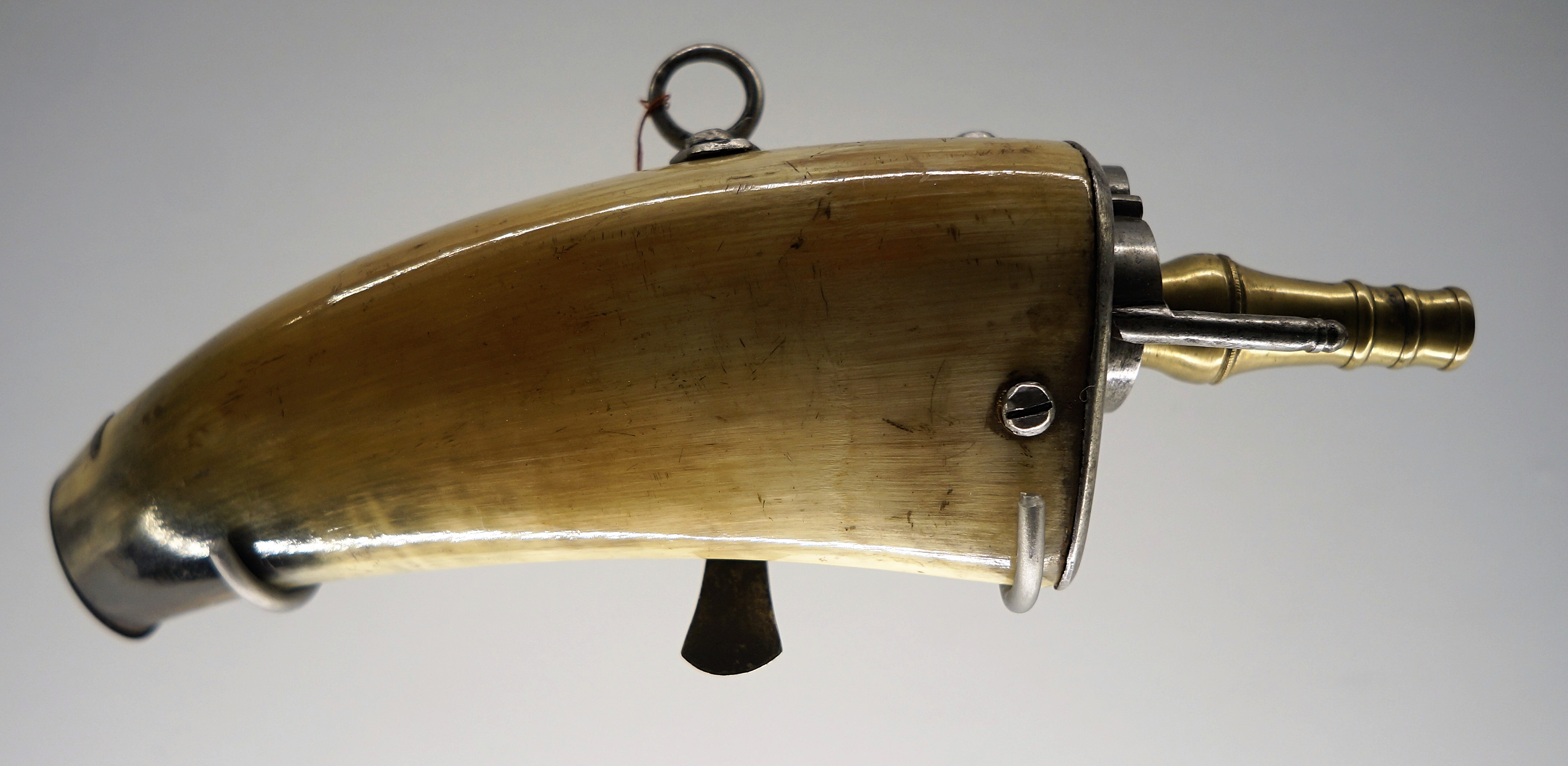
Powder flask (Powder horns )in "Palais des Beaux-Arts" of Lille France

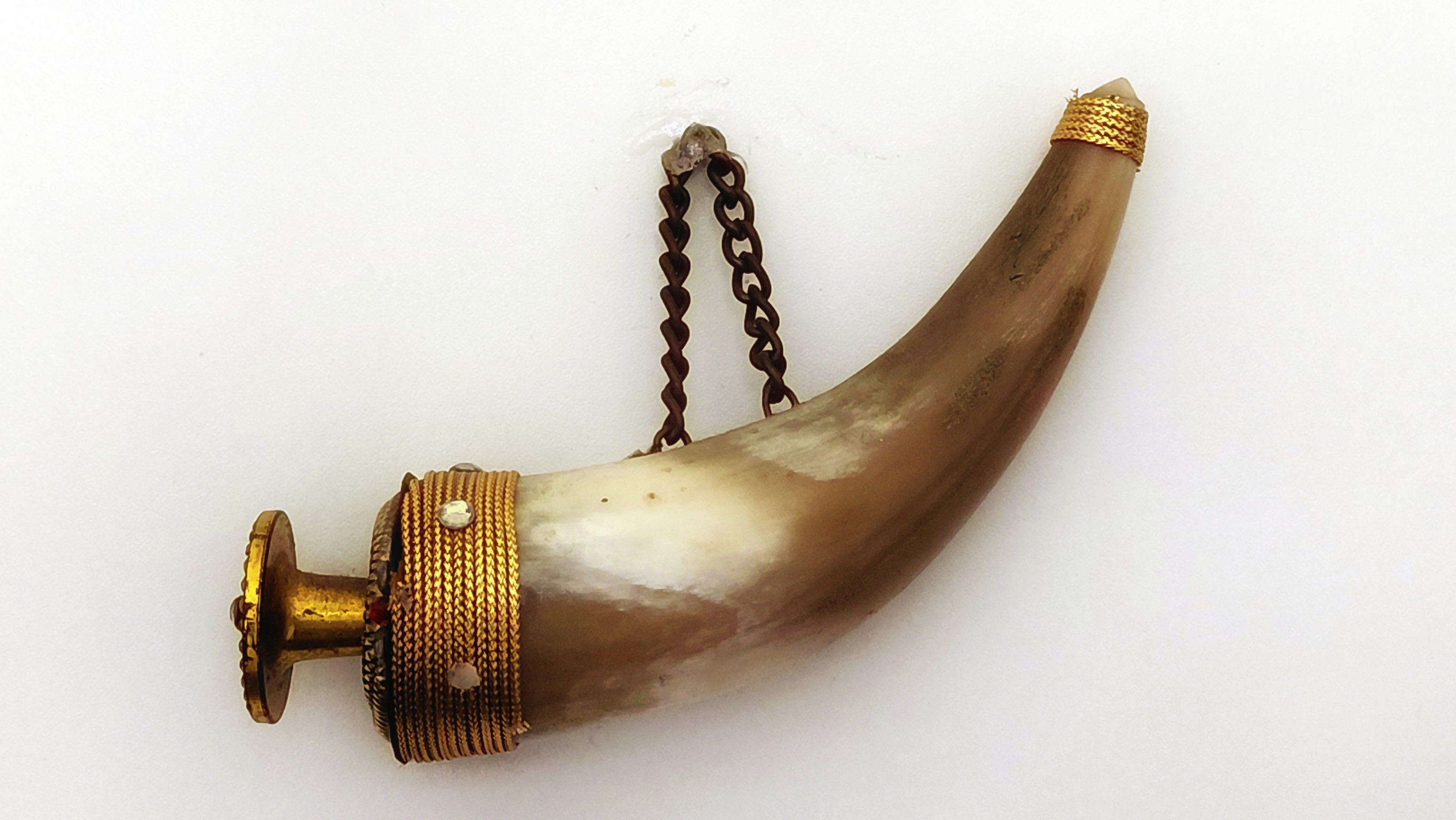
Cossack gunpowder horn
