= Patrick Miller (politician) =

Patrick Miller (died 26 February 1845) was a Scottish officer in the British Army and a politician. He sat in the House of Commons of Great Britain from 1790 to 1796.

He was the son of Patrick Miller of Dalswinton, an Edinburgh banker. He was a nephew of Sir Thomas Miller, 1st Baronet and a first cousin of William Miller (1755–1846).

He became a captain the in 14th Dragoons in 1789, and was with his regiment in Ireland when he was elected at the 1790 general election as the MP for Dumfries Burghs. The election was fiercely contested, with Miller's patron the 4th Duke of Queensberry spending over £8,000, while rival candidate Sir James Johnstone spent over £12,000 (equivalent to £1.81 million in 2023). Johnstone lodged a petition, but Miller's election was upheld on 1 April 1791.

Miller left the army in 1791, and although he does not appear to have spoken in Parliament, he did vote in divisions. However, his record was inconsistent, as he followed the shifting politics of his patron Queensberry.

He did not stand for re-election in the 1796 general election. In 1806 he wrote to Charles Fox seeking his support for a re-entry to Parliament, and apologising for his previous erratic conduct. He explained that this was due to Queensberry's "silly and selfish views", but his efforts were unsuccessful.

Parliament of Great Britain
Preceded by Sir James Johnstone, 4th Bt	Member of Parliament for Dumfries Burghs; 1790–1796	Succeeded by Alexander Hope
