= Richard Vanden-Bempde-Johnstone =

British Member of Parliament

The Right Honourable Sir Richard Vanden-Bempde-Johnstone, Bt

Member of Parliament for Weymouth
- In office 1790–1796 Serving with Sir James Murray Pulteney, Andrew Stuart, Thomas Jones, Sir James Johnstone, Gabriel Tucker Steward
- Preceded by: Welbore Ellis; John Purling; Sir Thomas Rumbold; Gabriel Steward
- Succeeded by: Sir James Murray Pulteney; Andrew Stuart; Gabriel Tucker Steward; William Garthshore

Personal details
- Born: Richard Johnstone; 21 September 1732
- Died: 14 July 1807 (aged 74)
- Spouses: Catherine Agnew (m. 1756; died 1790) Margaret Scott (m. 1795)
- Parent(s): John Johnstone; Charlotte van den Bempde

Sir Richard Vanden-Bempde-Johnstone, 1st Baronet (21 September 1732 – 14 July 1807) was a British Member of Parliament.

== Early life ==
Born Richard Johnstone he was the son of Colonel John Johnstone (d. 1741), second son of Sir William Johnstone, 2nd Baronet, of Westerhall. His mother was Charlotte, daughter of John van den Bempde of Hackness Hall in Hackness, near Scarborough, Yorkshire.

== Career ==
Vanden-Bampde-Johnstone was elected to the House of Commons for Weymouth in 1790, a seat he held until 1796. On 6 July 1795 he was created a Baronet, of Hackness Hall in the North Riding of the County of York.

== Personal life ==
In November 1756, he married Catherine Agnew, a daughter of James Agnew. After the death of his first wife in 1790, he married, secondly, Margaret Scott, daughter of John Scott, on 26 February 1795. Together, they were the parents of:

- Margaret Anne Vanden-Bempde-Johnstone (d. 1819), who married George Johnstone, son of Charles John Johnstone.
- Sir John Vanden-Bempde-Johnstone, 2nd Baronet (1799–1869), who married Louisa Augusta Venables-Vernon, daughter of Most Rev. and Rt. Hon. Edward Venables-Vernon-Harcourt and Lady Anne Leveson-Gower (a daughter of Granville Leveson-Gower, 1st Marquess of Stafford), in 1825.
- Reverend Charles Vanden-Bempde-Johnstone (1800–1882), the Canon of York who married Amelia Hawksworth, daughter of Reverend Richard Hawksworth and Isabella Pilkington, in 1827.

Bempdé's Name Act 1793
- Act of Parliament
- Parliament of Great Britain
- Long title: An Act to enable Richard Johnstone Vanden Bempdé Esquire, (lately called Richard Bempdé Johnstone,) and the Heirs Male of His Body, to take the Surname, and bear the Arms of Vanden Bempdé only, pursuant to the Will of John Vanden Bempdé Esquire, deceased.
- Citation: 33 Geo. 3. c. 1 Pr.
- Territorial extent: Great Britain

Dates
- Royal assent: 28 February 1793
- Commencement: 13 December 1792 (Note: Start of session.)

Status: Current legislation

In February 1793 he assumed by a private act of Parliament, Bempdé's Name Act 1793 (33 Geo. 3. c. 1 Pr.) his maternal grandfather's surname of Vanden-Bempde but in 1795 he was authorised by royal licence to resume the name of Johnstone in addition to those of Vanden-Bempde.

He died in July 1807, aged 74, and was succeeded in the baronetcy by his son John. His grandson Sir Harcourt Vanden-Bempde-Johnstone, 3rd Baronet, was raised to the peerage as Baron Derwent in 1881.

== See also ==
- Johnstone Baronets of Westerhall

== Notes ==
Parliament of Great Britain
Preceded by Welbore Ellis; John Purling; Sir Thomas Rumbold; Gabriel Steward	Member of Parliament for Weymouth; 1790–1796; With: Sir James Murray Pulteney 1790–1796; Andrew Stuart 1790–1796; Thomas Jones 1790–1791; Sir James Johnstone 1791–1794; Gabriel Tucker Steward 1794–1796	Succeeded by Sir James Murray Pulteney; Andrew Stuart; Gabriel Tucker Steward; William Garthshore
Baronetage of Great Britain
New creation	Baronet (of Hackness Hall); 1795–1807	Succeeded by John Vanden-Bempde-Johnstone
