= Rick Johnson =

Rick Johnson may refer to:

== People ==
- Rick Johnson (Canadian politician), Ontario Liberal Party Member of Provincial Parliament for Haliburton—Kawartha Lakes—Brock
- Rick Johnson (Michigan politician), served as Speaker of the Michigan House of Representatives (2001–2004)
- Rick Johnson (offensive lineman) (born 1963), American football player
- Rick Johnson (musician) (born 1980), American musician and bass player
- Rick Johnson (programmer), game developer of Black Crypt
- Rick Johnson (quarterback) (born 1961), American actor and director, and former CFL and USFL quarterback
- Rick Johnson (writer) (born 1956), Christian author and speaker

== Fictional characters ==
- Rick Johnson (A Nightmare on Elm Street), in the A Nightmare on Elm Street film series

== See also ==
- Ricky Johnson (born 1964), American motocross, NASCAR and off-road racer
- Dick Johnson (disambiguation)
- Rich Johnson (disambiguation)
- Richard Johnson (disambiguation)
