= Rich Johnson =

Rich Johnson may refer to:

- Rich Johnson (publishing executive), publishing executive in the field of graphic novels
- Rich Johnson (basketball) (1946–1994), American basketball player
- Rich Johnson (American football) (born 1947), American football running back
- Rich Johnson (meteorologist), former The Weather Channel meteorologist

== See also ==
- Dick Johnson (disambiguation)
- Richard Johnson (disambiguation)
- Rick Johnson (disambiguation)
