= Richard S. Johnson (artist) =

American painter (born 1953)

- Born: Richard S. Johnson; 25 February 1953 (age 73); Chicago, Illinois, U.S.
- Known for: Painter/Illustrator
- Movement: Impressionism
- Awards: Honorable Mention, 2005 Salon International, International Museum of Contemporary Masters of Fine Art, Greenhouse Gallery, San Antonio, TX 2003 Award of Excellence, Oil Painters of America, Midwest Regional Juried Exhibition, Hilligoss Gallery, Chicago IL 2003 People's Choice Award, Salon International, International Museum of Contemporary Masters of Fine Art, Greenhouse Gallery, San Antonio, TX 1998 Winner, Janet Ross Commemorative Award for landscapes, The National Oil and Acrylic Painters Society 1997 Winner, ARTemis Award, Romance Writers of America

Richard S. Johnson (born February 25, 1953) is an American contemporary painter based in Chicago, Illinois.

== Biography ==
Johnson was born in Chicago to a family of artists. While still in primary school, Johnson was accepted as a scholar to the Art Institute of Chicago. A graduate of the American Academy of Art, he embarked on a career as an illustrator.

== Influences ==
Johnson is heavily influenced by Charles Dana Gibson, N.C. Wyeth, and John Singer Sargent, whose books he read as a child.

== Style ==
Johnson's style has been regarded as having the technical excellence of Pre-Raphaelite romanticism mixed with contemporary expressionism and abstraction.

Johnson has also made portraits of historical personalities, such as former US president John F. Kennedy and former NASA administrator Richard H. Truly. His portrait of JFK now hangs at the John F. Kennedy Presidential Library and Museum in Boston, Massachusetts. He was also commissioned to create a commemorative painting honoring former US presidents. The painting is currently on display at the President's Council on Fitness, Sports, and Nutrition in Washington, D.C.
