= Richard Johnson =

Richard or Dick Johnson may refer to:

== Academics ==
- Dick Johnson (academic) (1929–2019), Australian academic
- Richard C. Johnson (1930–2003), professor of electrical engineering
- Richard A. Johnson, artist and professor at the University of New Orleans
- Richard Johnson, former director of the Birmingham Centre for Contemporary Cultural Studies

== Arts and entertainment ==
- Richard Johnson (war artist) (born 1966), Canadian journalist and war artist
- Richard S. Johnson (artist) (born 1939), American painter
- Richard Johnson (actor) (1927–2015), English actor
- Richard Johnson (columnist), American gossip columnist
- Richard Johnson (director) (born 1974), American film director who founded Joystick Films in 2005
- Dick Johnson (clarinetist) (1925–2010), musician, played in the Artie Shaw band
- Richard Johnson (16th-century writer) (1573–c. 1659), romance writer
- Richard B. Johnson (born 1943), Abominable Firebug author
- Richard Johnson (pianist) (born 1975), American composer, jazz pianist, and music professor
- Richard "Dick" Johnson, subject of the 2020 documentary Dick Johnson Is Dead
- Dick Johnson, alias of the bandit Ramirez in Giacomo Puccini's La fanciulla del West

== Aviation ==
- Dick Johnson (test pilot) (1917–2002), founding member of the Society of Experimental Test Pilots in 1955
- Dick Johnson (glider pilot) (1923–2008), glider pilot, aeronautical engineer and writer
- Richard Johnson, test-pilot of the X-4 Bantam

== Law and politics ==
- Richard Mentor Johnson (1780–1850), American politician and 9th vice president of the United States
- Richard Johnson (mayor), American politician and city manager
- Richard Johnson (judge) (1937–2019), president of the High Court of Ireland
- Richard Z. Johnson (1837–1913), 2nd attorney general of the Idaho Territory

== Sports ==
- Richard Johnson (cricketer, born 1829) (1829–1851), English cricketer
- Richard Johnson (cricketer, born 1974), English cricketer
- Richard Johnson (cricketer, born 1979), former English cricketer
- Richard Johnson (cricketer, born 1988), cricketer
- Richard Johnson (Welsh golfer) (born 1972), Welsh professional golfer
- Richard S. Johnson (golfer) (born 1976), Swedish professional golfer
- Dick Johnson (footballer) (1895–1933), English footballer
- Richard Johnson (soccer) (born 1974), Australian footballer
- Richard Johnson (defensive back) (born 1963), former NFL cornerback
- Richard Johnson (wide receiver) (born 1961), former NFL wide receiver
- Dick Johnson (gridiron football) (born 1939), American football player
- Dick Johnson (racing driver) (born 1945), Australian racing driver
- Richard Johnson (jockey) (born 1977), British jockey
- Richard Fulke Johnson Houghton (born 1940), British racehorse trainer
- Butch Johnson (Richard Andrew Johnson, born 1955), American Olympic medalist in archery
- Rich Johnson (basketball) (1946–1994), American basketball player
- Dick Johnson (rugby league) (1916–1984), Australian rugby league footballer
- Dick Johnson (sailor) (1923–2005), sailor from United States Virgin Islands

== Other ==
- Richard Johnson (chaplain) (c. 1753–1827), chaplain of the first settlement in New South Wales
- Richard W. Johnson (1827–1897), Civil War general
- Richard Johnson (engineer) (1827–1924), British engineer, chief engineer to the Great Northern Railway
- Richard W. Johnson (oceanographer) (1929–2016), American oceanographer
- Richard T. Johnson (died 2015), Johns Hopkins neurologist
- Richard Johnson (architect) (born 1946), Australian architect
- Dick Johnson (reporter) (1953–2020), American television news anchor and reporter
- Richard Johnson (entrepreneur) (born 1961), American businessman, founder of hotjobs.com

== See also ==
- Rich Johnson (disambiguation)
- Rick Johnson (disambiguation)
