= William Garthshore =

English politician

William Garthshore FRSE (1764–1806) was an English politician, a Member of Parliament from 1795 to 1806.

== Life ==
The son of Maxwell Garthshore, he was born in London on 28 October 1764. He was educated at Westminster School and Christ Church, Oxford, where he graduated M.A. in 1789, and became a tutor. He later was tutor to the Earl of Dalkeith, and made a Grand Tour in Europe with him.

Returning in 1792, he was recommended to the government by Henry Scott, 3rd Duke of Buccleuch, father of the Earl; and was appointed private secretary to Henry Dundas when War Secretary in 1794. In the same year he married Jane Chalié, daughter of a wealthy wine merchant.

Garthshore was elected M.P. for Launceston in January 1795, and for Weymouth in September of the same year, and retained his seat till his death. In the same year he was also elected a Fellow of the Royal Society of Edinburgh. His proposers were John Playfair, Alexander Monro (secundus) and William Wright.

In 1801 he was appointed a Lord of the Admiralty by Henry Addington, which post he held till 1804; but the death of his father-in-law, his wife, and only child within a few days of one another (5 and 9 August 1803) caused a personal breakdown. He died on 5 April 1806.
