= Gabriel Tucker Steward =

British politician (c.1768–1836)

Gabriel Tucker Steward (c. 1768-1836) was a Tory politician, Member of the Great Britain and UK Parliaments for Weymouth and Melcombe Regis 1794–1810 and served as Governor of Portland Castle.
