= John Avery =

John Avery may refer to:

== Politics and law ==
- John Avery (MP for Old Sarum) (1362–1397), MP for Old Sarum
- John Avery (MP for Weymouth) (fl. 1393), MP for Weymouth
- John Avery Jr. (1739–1806), American politician; first Massachusetts Secretary of the Commonwealth
- John Avery (politician) (1824–1914), American physician and U.S. representative from Michigan
- John Avery (lawyer) (born 1948), Australian barrister

== Others ==
- Henry Every (alias "John Avery", 1659–after 1699), English pirate
- John Avery (organ builder) (c. 1755–1807), English organ builder
- Skip Avery (John Thomas Avery, 1923–1990), American baseball player
- John Avery (police officer) (1927–2018), Australian police commissioner
- John Scales Avery (1933–2024), American physicist and chemist
- John Avery (gridiron football) (born 1976), American football player in the NFL and CFL
- John Avery (journalist), Belizean public utilities commissioner and journalist

== See also ==
- Jack Avery (disambiguation)
- Avery John (born 1975), soccer player from Trinidad & Tobago
