= John Abbot (14th-century MP) =

Member of the Parliament of England

Member of Parliament for Melcombe Regis
- In office 1393–1393 Serving with Robert Veel
- Preceded by: John Northovere
- Succeeded by: Robert Calche

Mayor of Melcombe Regis
- In office September 1399 – 1400

Personal details
- Occupation: Politician

John Abbot (fl. 1379–1414) was an English politician who served as Member of Parliament for Melcombe Regis in 1393 and mayor of Melcombe Regis from September 1399 until 1400. By 1379 Abbot owned property in Melcombe, which later included a house in St. Mary Street. He was said to have engaged in the wine and cloth trade. Three of his sons, John, Robert, and William, were also MPs .
