= Richard Hurst (disambiguation) =

Richard Hurst is a British writer and director.

Richard Hurst or Herst may also refer to:

- Richard Hurst (MP) for Melcombe Regis
- Richard Hurst (actor) (died 1805), British stage actor
- Richard Hurst (cricketer), English cricketer
- Rick Hurst (Richard Hurst, born 1946), American actor
- Richard Hurst (acrobatic gymnast) in 2012 Acrobatic Gymnastics World Championships
- Richard Hurst, character in The Rat Catchers
- Richard Herst (died 1628), English Catholic martyr
