= Frederick Villiers =

Frederick Villiers may refer to:

- Frederic Villiers (1851–1922), British war artist and correspondent
- Frederick Villiers Meynell (1801–1872), British Whig politician, initially known as Frederick Villiers
- Frederick Child Villiers (1815–1871), British Conservative politician
