= John Williams (Weymouth MP) =

English politician

Member of Parliament for Weymouth
- In office April 1554 – November 1554 Serving with John Wadham

Personal details
- Born: Langton Herring, Dorset

John Williams (c. 1518 – 1557 or 1558) was an English politician who was Member of Parliament (MP) for Weymouth in 1554.
