= William Freestun =

British politician

Sir William Lockyer Freestun KCT, KBE, KHS

Member of Parliament for Weymouth and Melcombe Regis
- In office 2 August 1847 – 30 April 1859 Serving with Robert Campbell (1857–1859); George Butt (1852–1857); Frederick Child Villiers (Dec. 1847–1852); William Dougal Christie (Aug. 1847–Dec. 1847)
- Preceded by: Ralph Bernal; William Dougal Christie
- Succeeded by: Robert Brooks; Arthur Egerton

Personal details
- Born: 1804
- Died: 16 April 1862 (aged 57) London, England
- Party: Liberal
- Other political affiliations: Whig
- Spouse: Josefa Benita (m. 1846)
- Parent(s): Edward Freestun; Mary Lockyer

Sir William Lockyer Freestun, KCT, KBE, (1804 – 16 April 1862) was a British Liberal and Whig politician.

== Family ==
Freestun was the son of Edward Freestun and Mary née Lockyer, daughter of William Lockyer. He married Josefa Benita, relict of Charles Pratt, in 1846.

== Military career ==
He entered the army as ensign in the 5th Regiment of Foot, serving for 23 years, and was also on the staff of The Royal British Legion under Sir George de Lacy Evans between 1835 and 1837, during which time he became colonel and was wounded three times. During this time, he became a Knight Commander under the Order of Charles III, and also received the first class of the orders of San Fernando and of Isabella the Catholic.

Between 1840 and 1842, Freestun served on the staff in Syria, holding the local rank of Major, as Assistant Adjutant-General, with him then being presented with a gold medal by the Sultan. During a visit to Jerusalem in 1841 he was admitted as a Knight of the Holy Sepulchre.

== Political career ==
Freestun was first elected Whig MP for Weymouth and Melcombe Regis at the 1847 general election, and held the seat until 1859, when he stood as a Liberal but was defeated.

== Other activities ==
Knighted in 1860, Freestun was also a Deputy Lieutenant for Dorset and a Justice of the Peace for the same county.

Parliament of the United Kingdom
Preceded by Ralph Bernal; William Dougal Christie	Member of Parliament for Weymouth and Melcombe Regis; 1847–1859; With: Robert Campbell (1857–1859); George Butt (1852–1857); Frederick Child Villiers (Dec. 1847–1852); William Dougal Christie (Aug. 1847–Dec. 1847)	Succeeded by Robert Brooks; Arthur Egerton
