= Henry Barbour =

Henry Barbour may refer to:

- Henry E. Barbour (1877–1945), US Representative from California
- Henry Barbour (MP for Reading), MP for Reading in 1384 and 1391
- Henry Barbour (MP for Melcombe Regis), MP for Melcombe Regis in 1414
- Henry Gray Barbour (1886–1943), American physiologist and pharmacologist
