= Ernst Eiselen =

Ernst Wilhelm Bernhard Eiselen
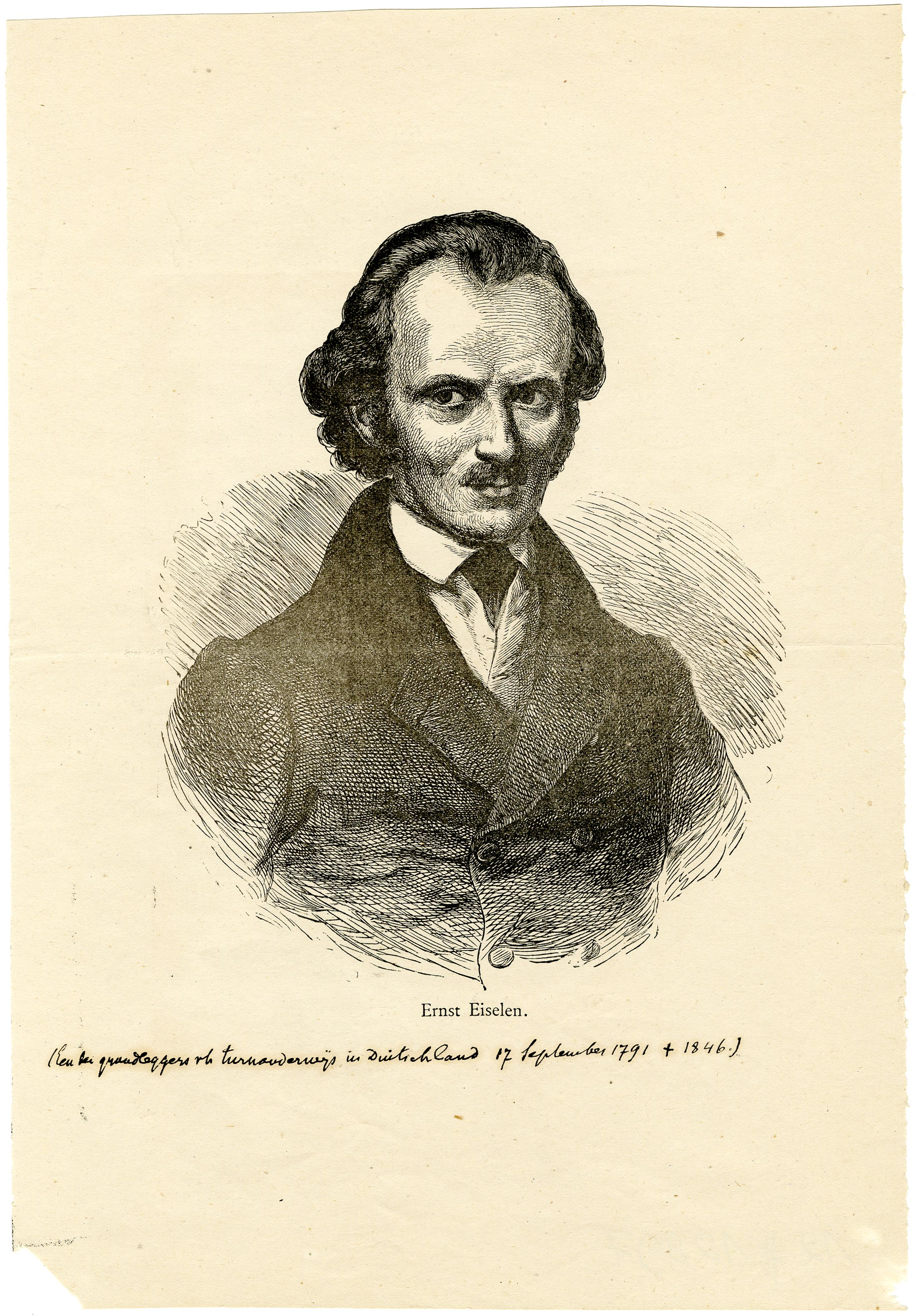
- Born: 27 September 1792; Berlin
- Died: 22 August 1846 (aged 53); Misdroy
- Occupations: Gymnast; Gymnastics promoter; teacher
- Known for: Promoting the Jahn style of gymnastics

Ernst Wilhelm Bernhard Eiselen (born Berlin, 27 September 1792; died Misdroy, 22 August 1846) was a German gymnast and a promoter of the Jahn style of gymnastics.

== Biography ==
Arsenical poisoning in his youth had permanently impaired Eiselen's health. His early studies began in Berlin, and he was one of the earliest and most capable pupils of the gymnast Jahn. He soon became prominent among the young gymnasts of Berlin. During the War of the Sixth Coalition (1812–1815), he went with Jahn to Breslau to join the Lützow Free Corps, however his ill-health disqualified him for military duty, and he was persuaded to stay behind and direct exercise at Jahn's Hasenheide exercise field (German: Turnplatz).

When the Hasenheide Turnplatz was closed in the spring of 1819, Eiselen became a teacher of gymnastics in the Plamann school for boys. He had also learned some mathematics, enough to teach geometry as well. Among his pupils at the school was Otto von Bismarck. In April 1825, Eiselen rented quarters and opened a school in Berlin that taught foil and saber fencing and vaulting to students from the University of Berlin. Two years later, he received permission to open a private gym that offered instruction in gymnastics.

In May 1828, he opened a gym with indoor and outdoor equipment and had a vast number of pupils. He added courses for teachers in 1831, and the first gymnasium for young girls was instituted by him in 1832. By 1836, the number of pupils had increased to the extent that he opened another gym in another part of the city. It was managed and later directed by Wilhelm Lübeck.

He established the terms still used in German fencing.

== Works ==
He published many works on gymnastics and fencing, including:

- Deutsche Turnkunst (in collaboration with Jahn and others, 1816) Eiselen undertook the technical portions, with the help of Massmann, Dürre and others. Jahn wrote the remainder, decided in doubtful cases, and revised the whole.
- Hantelübungen (3d ed. 1883)
- Abbildungen von Turnübungen (Exercise illustrated; 5th ed. 1889)
- Das deutsche Hiebfechten (new ed. 1882)
- Abriss des deutschen Stossfechtens (1826)
- Turntafeln (1837)
