= 1831 Weymouth and Melcolmbe Regis by-election =

United Kingdom Parliamentary by-election

1831 Weymouth and Melcombe Regis by-election
- August 1, 1831
- Registered: c. 700
- Turnout: c. 84.3%
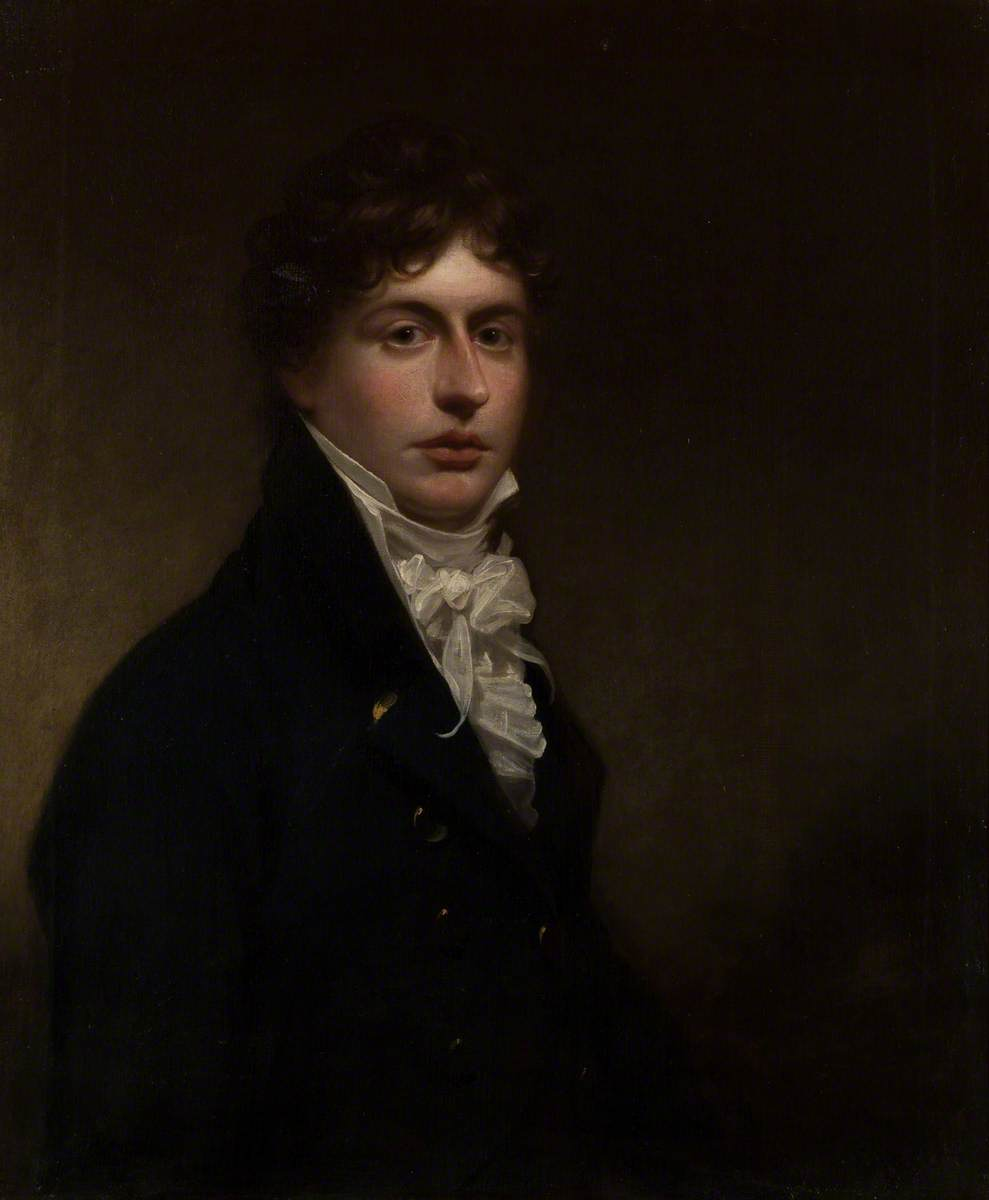
		Whi
Candidate	Charles Baring Wall	Michael Prendergast
Party	Tory	Whig
Popular vote	425	165
Percentage	72.0%	28.0%
MP before election
Vacant
Elected MP
Charles Baring Wall
Tory

A by-election for the United Kingdom Parliamentary constituency of Weymouth and Melcombe Regis was held on 1 August 1831, triggered by Richard Weyland being elected in both Weymouth and Melcombe Regis and Oxford during the 1831 United Kingdom general election. Weyland opted to take his seat in the Oxford constituency. The by-election was won by Charles Baring Wall.

== Reform of electoral system ==
This election, just months after the last general election, came to be dominated by debate surrounding the Whig's plans to reform the electoral system. While the general election in the constituency resulted in two anti-reform Tories and two pro-reform Whigs, the by-election caused by Richard Weyland choosing to take a seat in Oxfordshire left the Tories with the opportunity to gain another seat for the anti-reform debate.

Despite the Tory victory in the by-election, the Reform Act 1832 would be passed in 1832.
