= John Cornelius =

John Cornelius may refer to:

- John Cornelius (priest) (1557–1594), English Catholic priest, Jesuit and martyr
- John Cornelius (MP) (died 1567), English politician
- John Cornelius (pirate), Irish pirate
