= William Benefield =

English politician

William Benefield (fl. 1416–1422) was an English politician. He sat as MP for Melcombe Regis in May 1421.

He also served as bailiff of Melcombe Regis from September 1416 till 1417 and 1419 till 1421.

John Benefield, who was elected bailiff of Melcombe Regis in September 1400 was probably a kinsman of William.
