= Robert Aley =

16th-century English politician

Robert Aley (fl. 1529) was an English politician, Member of Parliament for Weymouth in 1529.
