= John Abbot (15th-century MP) =

1423 MP for Weymouth, Dorset

- Born: fl. 1423
- Occupation: politician
- Known for: a Member of Parliament for Weymouth

John Abbot (fl. 1423) was an English politician who served as a Member of Parliament for Weymouth in 1423. He was the son of John Abbot, another MP, and two of his brothers, Robert and William, were also MPs.
