= Henry Gridley =

British Liberal politician and barrister

Captain Henry Gillett Gridley (12 November 1820 – 25 January 1891) was a Barrister and a British Liberal politician. He was elected as member of parliament for Weymouth and Melcombe Regis at the 1865 general election, but resigned his seat on 6 June 1867 due to ill-health by becoming Steward of the Manor of Northstead.

Gridley was born in Norwich, Norfolk on 12 November 1820.

He was appointed a member of the Honourable Corps of Gentlemen at Arms in 1860 and Deputy Lieutenant of the Tower of London. Gridley died at his home in London on 25 Jan 1891 aged 70.

Parliament of the United Kingdom
| Preceded by Viscount Grey de Wilton; Robert Brooks | Member of Parliament for Weymouth and Melcombe Regis; 1865 – 1867; With: Robert Brooks | Succeeded by Henry Edwards; Robert Brooks |
