= John Gardener (MP for Melcombe Regis) =

15th-century English politician

John Gardener (fl. 1417) was an English Member of Parliament for Melcombe Regis in 1417.
