= Roger Stourton =

16th-century English politician

Roger Stourton (by 1509–1551), was an English landowner and politician.

Roger was the youngest son of Edward Stourton, 6th Baron Stourton.

He married Joan, the daughter of Robert Bures (d. 1524) of Acton, Suffolk. By the marriage settlement agreed in January 1530 he received the manor and advowson of Up Cerne, Dorset from his parents. However, he lived with his wife predominantly at Tarrant Rushton. He occasionally attended Henry VIII's court, being present at the reception of Anne of Cleves in 1539.

He was a justice of the peace in Dorset from 1536 and served in various administrative roles as a commissioner and as escheator. He was a member of the Parliament of England for Weymouth in 1545.

He died in January 1551, leaving his wife his manor house at Rushton, Up Cerne and his sheep and cattle for her life. As they had no children, his heir was his nephew Charles Stourton, 8th Baron Stourton, with whom his wife soon found herself in dispute. She also had to defend her possession of Rushton, which was not confirmed until 1557.
