= John Hurst (cricketer) =

English cricketer

Personal information
- Full name: John Hurst
- Born: 1816 or 1817; Cowley, Oxfordshire, England
- Died: 4 March 1868 (aged 51/52); Headington, Oxfordshire, England
- Batting: Unknown
- Bowling: Unknown

Domestic team information
- Years: Team
- 1843: Oxford University

Career statistics
Competition	First-class
Matches	1
Runs scored	10
Batting average	5.00
100s/50s	–/–
Top score	10
Balls bowled	?
Wickets	11
Bowling average	?
5 wickets in innings	2
10 wickets in match	–
Best bowling	6/?
Catches/stumpings	1/–
- Source: Cricinfo, 24 June 2020

John Hurst (1816 or 1817 – 4 March 1868) was an English first-class cricketer.

Hurst was born at Cowley in late 1816 or early 1817. He made a single appearance in first-class cricket for Oxford University against the Marylebone Cricket Club (MCC) at Lord's in 1843, though his overall association with the University of Oxford is unknown. Batting twice against the MCC, he was dismissed for 10 runs in the Oxford first innings by William Hillyer, while in their second innings he was dismissed without scoring by Jemmy Dean. Hurst also took 11 wickets in the match, taking six wickets in the MCC first innings and five wickets in the MCC second innings. Playing in the same Oxford side were possible relations Richard Hurst and Edmund Hurst. He died at Cowley in March 1868.
