= George Butt (politician) =

British politician

George Medd Butt

Member of Parliament for Weymouth and Melcombe Regis
- In office 10 July 1852 – 27 March 1857 Serving with William Freestun
- Preceded by: William Freestun; Frederick Child Villiers
- Succeeded by: William Freestun; Robert Campbell

Personal details
- Born: 1797
- Died: 11 November 1860 (aged 63)
- Party: Conservative

George Medd Butt (1797 – 11 November 1860) was a British Conservative politician.

Butt was first elected Conservative MP for Weymouth and Melcombe Regis at the 1852 general election, and held the seat until 1857 when he was defeated.

Parliament of the United Kingdom
Preceded by William Freestun; Frederick Child Villiers	Member of Parliament for Weymouth and Melcombe Regis; 1852–1857; With: William Freestun	Succeeded by William Freestun; Robert Campbell
