= Ranulph Dacre =

English mariner and merchant (1797–1884)

- Born: 23 April 1797; Marwell Hall, Hampshire, England
- Died: 27 June 1884 (aged 87); Clapham, London
- Occupations: Master mariner and merchant
- Years active: 1810–1888

Ranulph Dacre (23 April 1797 – 27 June 1884) was a British master mariner and merchant who was active in both Australia and New Zealand.

== Early life ==
He was born to George and Julia Dacre at Marwell Hall, Hampshire, England on 23 April 1797. His father was the High Sheriff of Hampshire and a colonel of the militia. When he was 13 years of age, Ranulph joined the Royal Navy and remained in the service for six years. After leaving the Navy, he joined the merchant marine. His first voyage, in 1816, was to the West Indies. He was a master mariner by 1821, commanding the Barbados Packet for Thomas Barkworth between 1821 and 1823.

== In Australia ==
He arrived in Australia in August 1823 as master of Elizabeth (363 tons) owned by London merchant Robert Brooks, who was also aboard. Dacre and Brooks jointly purchased the schooner Endeavour (61 tons) which Dacre commanded on a voyage to New Zealand and Tahiti. In Tahiti, Dacre took aboard the Reverend Daniel Tyerman and George Bennet (missionary) on their famous inspection tour of South Sea missions, and gave them passage to Sydney. He continued to trade around the region and made two voyages back to Britain on the Surry, before deciding, in about 1830, to settle in Australia.

He was the local agent for Robert Brooks. He also became a prominent merchant in his own right. He owned a number of ships and a wharf, from which he traded to the islands and engaged in pelagic whaling. Dacre owned five vessels that made eight whaling voyages from Sydney between 1838 and 1844. He was slow to repatriate funds to Brooks in London, sometimes using them for new speculative ventures of his own. For instance, on 13 February 1839, he paid £384 for 32 acres in the second sale of Melbourne land. A major economic depression began in 1840 and his financial situation became critical. His poor record-keeping was another issue that prompted Brooks to replace him as his agent in 1843 with another master mariner, Robert Towns.

== In New Zealand ==
Dacre traded successfully with the Māori population of New Zealand, including Eruera Maihi Patuone. He moved to New Zealand in the mid-1840s and made land claims he had bought from the Māori before 1840. In Auckland he went into business in 1844 with James Macky. In 1848, he purchased a 3,334-acre (1,349 ha) block of land south of Orewa on which two of his sons later established a cattle station. Other land purchases included a 4,000-acre (1,600 ha) property at Omaha. In 1854, he went into business with Thomas Macky and they traded as merchants and shipping agents.

After commuting between Australia and New Zealand, Dacre and family settled in Auckland in 1859. T. Macky & Co had become by then one of the largest firms in the city. Dacre lived on the slopes of Official Bay and he was active in the Anglican church. By 1882, he had restored his fortunes and owned more than 9,000 acres (3,600 ha) of land, worth almost £10,000. He was living in London when he died on 27 June 1884. The couple had seven sons and at least one daughter.
