= Robert Brooks (MP) =

British businessman and MP

Member of Parliament for Weymouth and Melcombe Regis
- In office 30 April 1859 – 17 November 1868 Serving with: Henry Edwards (1867–1868); Henry Gridley (1865–1867); Arthur Egerton (1859–1865)
- Preceded by: William Freestun; Robert Campbell
- Succeeded by: Charles J. T. Hambro; Henry Edwards

Personal details
- Born: 1790 Laceby, Lincolnshire, England
- Died: 6 June 1882 (aged 91–92) Woodcote Park, Surrey, England
- Party: Conservative
- Spouse: Hannah Penny (m. 1833)
- Children: 8

Robert Brooks (1790 – 5 June 1882) was a British Conservative Party politician, businessman and trader.

== Family ==
Born in Laceby, Lincolnshire—and baptised there at St Mary's Church on 5 April 1791—Brooks was the son of yeoman farmer William Brooks and Ann Ostler. In 1833, he married Hannah, daughter of wine merchant Joshua Penny, and they had five sons—including Robert Alexander, Henry and Herbert—and three daughters.

== Shipping business ==
Brooks was first apprenticed to Hull timber merchant and shipowner John Barkworth, under whom he travelled as supercargo to Mauritius in 1814, and India between 1818 and 1819, both times Barkworth's Elizabeth. Between the 1830s and 1870s, he became one of the leaders of trade between Britain and Australia, with some connection found between his own career—involving exporting, importing, shipping, finance, banking, and political lobbying including promoting assisted emigration—and the development of the colonial Australian economy.

In 1820, he established his own London-based firm and, in 1823, he made his first and only trade voyage to Australia, travelling aboard the Elizabeth, now his ship, to Hobart and Sydney. During the 1830s, he established business connections in eastern Australia and New Zealand, including Robert Campbell junior, John Rickards, and Raine and Ramsay, and became one of the largest importers of Australian wool. In this trade, he became chairman of the New South Wales and Van Diemen's Land Commercial Association, a London wool auction regulator, in 1846.

Throughout his working closely with trusted colleagues Ranulph Dacre from 1830 to 1843, Robert Towns from 1843 to 1847, and Charles Dickens' illustrator Octavius Browne from 1847 to 1855.

During his commercial ventures, he built a 12-ship fleet of Australian whaling vessels that made 35 voyages from Sydney between 1832 and 1860. In the 1850s, his interest in shipping diminished, and new investments in ships tended to be in those directed by business associates. Instead, he focused on financing the wool trade and other Australian ventures including gold mining.

In 1841, Brooks opened a small office in St Peter's Chambers, near Cornhill in the City of London, in 1855, he entered into partnership with Robert Spence, with the firm becoming known as Robert Brooks & Co. Three of Brooks' sons became partners of the firm in the 1860s, before Brooks then retired in 1872. The firm existed long after his death, holding as one of the largest importers of wool to the UK, and remained in family hands, diversifying into management and ownership of tea plantations in Ceylon, until 1968 when it entered liquidation.

== Corporate activities ==
Outside of his own business, between 1837 and 1876 Brooks was a founding director of the Union Bank of Australia, a forerunner of the Australia and New Zealand Banking Group, where he was a proponent of private merchants. He was also a director of the London Dock Company, the Southern Whale Fishery Company, and the Great Eastern Steam Navigation Company. He was also a director of a number of insurance and mining companies, and other abortive steamshipping ventures, and actively worked to maintain synergistic relationships between Australian trade companies and colleagues in the City of London.

== Political career ==
In 1859, Brooks was persuaded by Conservative colleagues to stand for election in Weymouth and Melcombe Regis, who cited his maritime aura as a positive factor. He then won the seat, holding it as a backbencher until 1868 when he did not seek re-election.

Parliament of the United Kingdom
Preceded by William Freestun; Robert Campbell	Member of Parliament for Weymouth and Melcombe Regis; 1859–1868; With: Henry Edwards (1867–1868); Henry Gridley (1865–1867); Arthur Egerton (1859–1865)	Succeeded by Charles J. T. Hambro; Henry Edwards
