= Henry Badecok =

English politician

Henry Badecok (fl. 1371–1393) was an English politician. He sat as MP for Weymouth in 1393.

He also served as bailiff of Weymouth from Michaelmas 1371 till 1372.
