= John Alday (MP) =

English politician

John Alday (fl. 1401–1413) was an English politician. He sat as MP for Weymouth in 1407.

He also served as bailiff of Weymouth from Michaelmas 1401 till 1402.
