= John Leweston =

16th-century English politician

John Leweston (1506/1507 – 26 April 1584), of Leweston, Dorset, was an English politician.

He was a member of parliament (MP) for Dorset in April 1554, Melcombe Regis in 1547, October 1553 and 1555, and Dorchester in 1559 and 1572.

He was married to Joan Leweston. They are both buried in a tomb in St Katherine's chapel in Sherborne Abbey in Sherborne, Dorset, England.
