= John Kete =

English politician (fl. 1387–1398)

John Kete (fl. 1387–1398) was an English politician. He sat as MP for Melcombe Regis in 1391.

By 1398, he married a woman called Rose.
