= Richard Phelips =

16th-century English politician

Richard Phelips (by 1488 – 1558), of Poole and Charborough, Dorset, Southwark, Surrey and London, was an English politician.

He was a member of parliament (MP) for Poole in 1512 and 1515, Melcombe Regis in 1529, Wareham in March 1553 and Dorset in 1554.
