= Frederick Child Villiers =

British politician

The Honorable Frederick Child-Villiers

Member of Parliament for Weymouth and Melcombe Regis
- In office 15 December 1847 – 10 July 1852 Serving with William Freestun
- Preceded by: William Freestun; William Dougal Christie
- Succeeded by: William Freestun; George Butt

Personal details
- Born: 20 July 1815
- Died: 23 May 1871 (aged 55)
- Party: Conservative
- Spouse: Lady Elizabeth van Reede (m. 1842)
- Parent(s): George Child Villiers, 5th Earl of Jersey; Frances Twysden

The Honourable Frederick William Child-Villiers (20 July 1815 – 23 May 1871) was a British Conservative politician.

Child-Villiers was the son of George Child Villiers, 5th Earl of Jersey, and Lady Sarah Sophia Fane. In 1842, he married Lady Elizabeth van Reede, daughter of Reynoud Diederik Jacob van Reede, 7th Earl of Athlone, and Henrietta Dorothea Maria née Hope, but they had no children.

He served in the army, as a captain in the Coldstream Guards, and attained the rank of lieutenant-colonel in the 73rd (Perthshire) Regiment of Foot.

Child-Villiers was elected Conservative Member of Parliament for Weymouth and Melcombe Regis at a by-election in 1847—caused by the resignation of William Dougal Christie—and held the seat until 1852 when he did not seek re-election.

In 1853 he was appointed Lt-Col Commandant of the new Royal Elthorne Light Infantry, a part-time Militia regiment in Middlesex.

He was High Sheriff of Northamptonshire in 1869.

Parliament of the United Kingdom
Preceded by William Freestun; William Dougal Christie	Member of Parliament for Weymouth and Melcombe Regis; 1847–1852; With: William Freestun	Succeeded by William Freestun; George Butt
