= Walter Cheverell =

English politician (died 1481)

Walter Cheverell (died 1481) was an English landowner, lawyer, administrator and politician from Dorset.

== Origins ==
Born about 1415, he was the son and heir of William Cheverell (died 1439), a lawyer and politician, and his wife Joan Chantmarle, daughter and coheiress of John Chantmarle (died 1412), a landowner.

== Career ==
Married by 1437, in 1439 he inherited his father's lands at East Stoke, Chantmarle, and Upper Sturthill in Burton Bradstock. In 1440 his father-in-law gave him and his wife a house in Dorchester and in 1442 he sat in Parliament with his father-in-law as one of the MPs for Weymouth. From then on he seems to have engaged in legal work, for example acting as feoffee for the MP John St Loe in 1449, and did not re-enter public life until the brief return to power of the Lancastrians in 1470, when he was named to royal commissions for Dorset and was made a justice of the peace for the county. When the Yorkists regained power in 1471, he obtained pardons for himself and his elder son and was re-appointed to the bench in 1473, sitting as a JP for the rest of his life. He died on 4 November 1481 and his elder son was his heir.

== Family ==
He married Christina Russell (died 1499), daughter of Henry Russell (died 1463) who sat with his son-in-law as the other MP for Weymouth in 1442, and they had two sons:

- John Cheverell, born about 1441, who married Margaret Wykes.
- Roger Cheverell, born about 1443, who married Isabel Farringdon.
