= Henry Edwards (1820–1897) =

British politician

Coordinates: 50.60921504543659°N 2.452344801519232°W

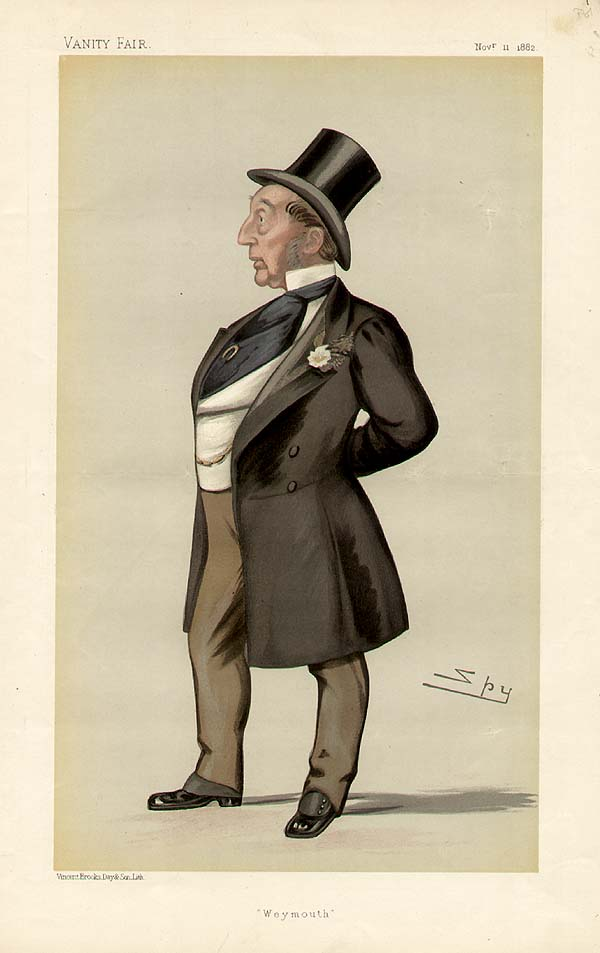
"Weymouth". Caricature by Spy published in Vanity Fair in 1882.

Sir Henry Edwards JP DL (1820 – 4 February 1897) was a British Liberal Member of Parliament for Weymouth and Melcombe Regis from 1867 until 1885, when Weymouth and Melcombe Regis ceased to be a parliamentary borough.

== Early life ==
Born in London, Edwards was the eldest son of John Edwards of Somerton Court, Somerset, and Elizabeth Brayley.

== Charity ==
He made generous gifts to the town – ten cottage homes known as Edwards Avenue and 'Edwardsville' in Rodwell Avenue, and also properties in James Street, all designed for elderly inhabitants of the borough. Sir Henry also provided an annual dinner for the elderly of Weymouth (known as the Edwards Dinner Gift). The properties are all today operated under the name Edwards Homes and run by Weymouth Town Charities who run the Sir Henry Edwards and the Sir Samuel Mico Charities.

== Death ==
Edwards died at his home at 53 Berkeley Square, London, after several months of illness. At the time of his death, he was lauded as the most generous benefactor in the history of Weymouth.

== Commemoration ==
Edwards generosity in Weymouth is celebrated by a statue in Alexandra Gardens on the esplanade, facing north east across Weymouth Bay and the beach.

The book The Rival Queens, written in 1880 by prominent Weymouth resident Joseph Drew, was dedicated to him.

Parliament of the United Kingdom
Preceded by Henry Gridley; Robert Brooks	Member of Parliament for Weymouth & Melcombe Regis; 1867 – 1885; With: Robert Brooks to 1868; Charles J. T. Hambro 1868–1874; Sir Frederick Johnstone from 1874	Constituency abolished
