= Edward Stourton, 6th Baron Stourton =

Arms of Stourton: Sable, a bend or between six fountains

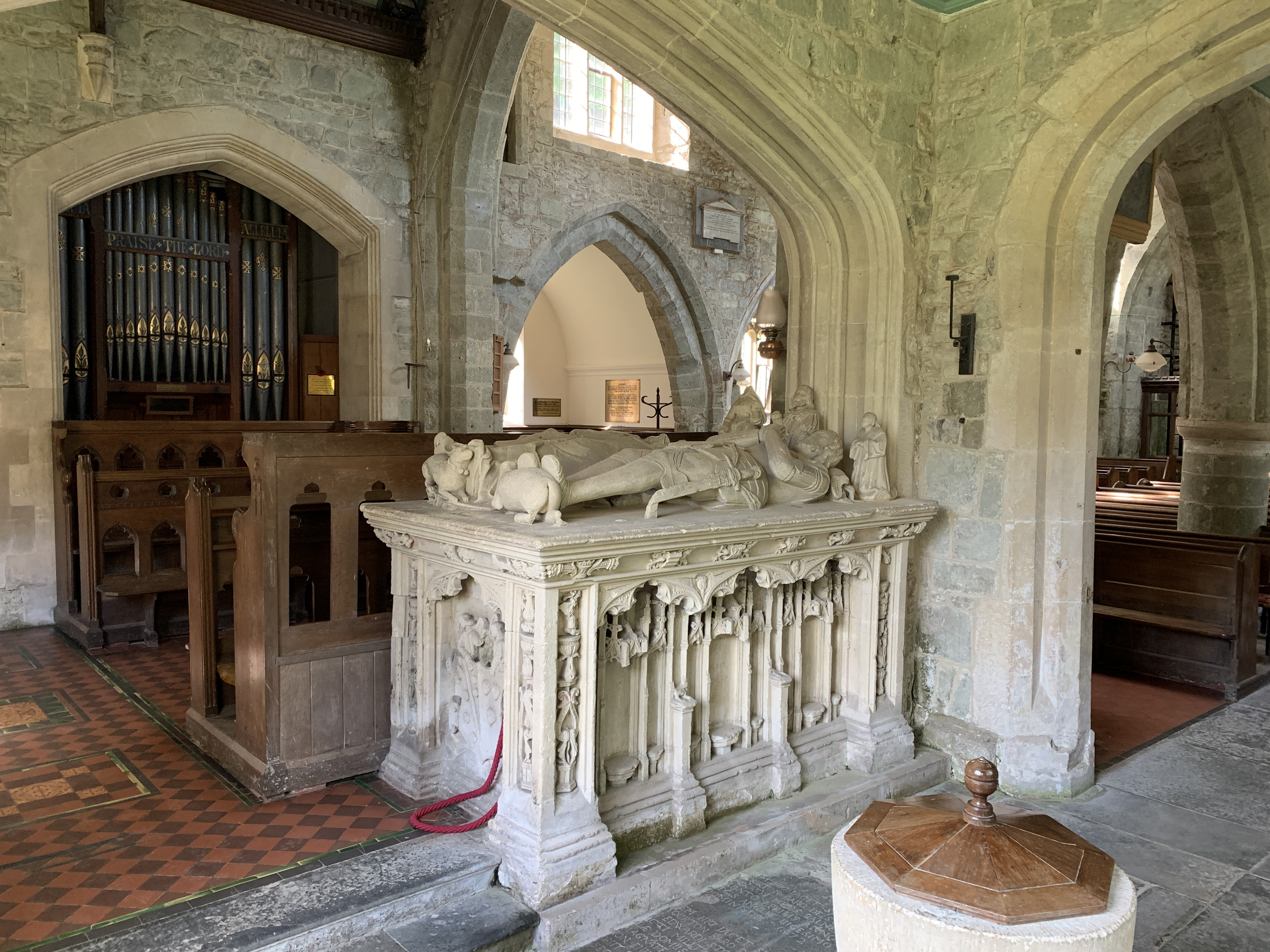
Tomb chest in St Peter's Church, Stourton, Wiltshire

Edward Stourton, 6th Baron Stourton (1463–1535) was a younger son of William, the second Baron Stourton and Margaret Chidiock, daughter of Sir John Chidiock, sometimes called Lord FitzPayne.

He succeeded his elder brother William in 1524. He inherited land spread over several counties and was a justice of the peace in Dorset, Somerset and Wiltshire and in 1514 was entrusted with the task of collecting £163,000 by poll-tax.

He married Agnes Fauntleroy, daughter of John Fauntleroy of Fauntleroy Marsh, Alweston and Joan, daughter and co-heiress of John Walsh of Purbeck, Dorset. They had three sons:

- Peter was intended to marry a daughter of Edmund Dudley, but died unmarried in his father's lifetime.
- William Stourton, 7th Baron Stourton(c1505-1548)
- Roger Stourton (by 1509-1551) to whom his father transferred the manor and advowson of Up Cerne, Dorset in 1530.

In December 1531 William, his son and heir, asked that his father be excused attendance at the House of Lords in view of his age and infirmity. However, he remained active in the county, as his letters to Thomas Cromwell show. He died on 13 December 1535 and was buried at Stourton. He was survived by his wife Agnes, who lived as a widow at Stourton Caundle, Dorset.

Peerage of England
| Preceded by William Stourton | Baron Stourton; 1523–1535 | Succeeded by William Stourton |
