= John Mill (by 1533 – 1562 or later) =

English politician

John Mill (by 1533 – 1562 or later) was an English politician.

He was a member (MP) of the parliament of England for Melcombe Regis in 1558.
