= Richard Shaw (Dorset MP) =

16th-century English politician

Richard Shaw (by 1533-63 or later), of Langton Matravers, Dorset, was an English politician.

He was a member (MP) of the parliament of England for Poole in April 1554, Melcombe Regis in 1558 and 1559 and for Wareham in 1563.
