= Thomas Colby (MP for Melcombe Regis) =

English politician (cl1530–1588)

Thomas Colby (c. 1530 – 5 March 1588) was an English politician from Sherfield-on-Loddon, Hampshire. He was said to be a puritan west-country lawyer 'of great living'.

He was a member (MP) of the Parliament of England for Melcombe Regis in 1563 and for St. Ives in 1586.

He married Elizabeth, daughter and heir of Edward Gilbert, alderman of London. He died on 5 March 1588. After Thomas's death Elizabeth married Michael Molyns (d. 1615) Member (MP) for Wallingford.
