= Robert Campbell (MP for Weymouth and Melcombe Regis) =

British politician

Member of Parliament for Weymouth and Melcombe Regis
- In office 27 March 1857 – 30 April 1859 Serving with William Freestun
- Preceded by: William Freestun; George Butt
- Succeeded by: Robert Brooks; Arthur Egerton

Personal details
- Born: 1813
- Died: 7 June 1862 (aged 48)
- Party: Liberal
- Other political affiliations: Whig

Robert James Roy Campbell (1813 – 7 June 1862) was a British Liberal and Whig politician.

Campbell was first elected Whig MP for Weymouth and Melcombe Regis at the 1857 general election, and held the seat until 1859, when he stood as a Liberal but was defeated.

Parliament of the United Kingdom
| Preceded by William Freestun; George Butt | Member of Parliament for Weymouth and Melcombe Regis; 1857–1859; With: William Freestun | Succeeded by Robert Brooks; Arthur Egerton |
