= William Coventre II =

English politician

William Coventre (fl. 1397) was an English politician.

Coventre was a member of parliament for Melcombe Regis in September 1397.
