= Johann Ernst Plamann =

German educator

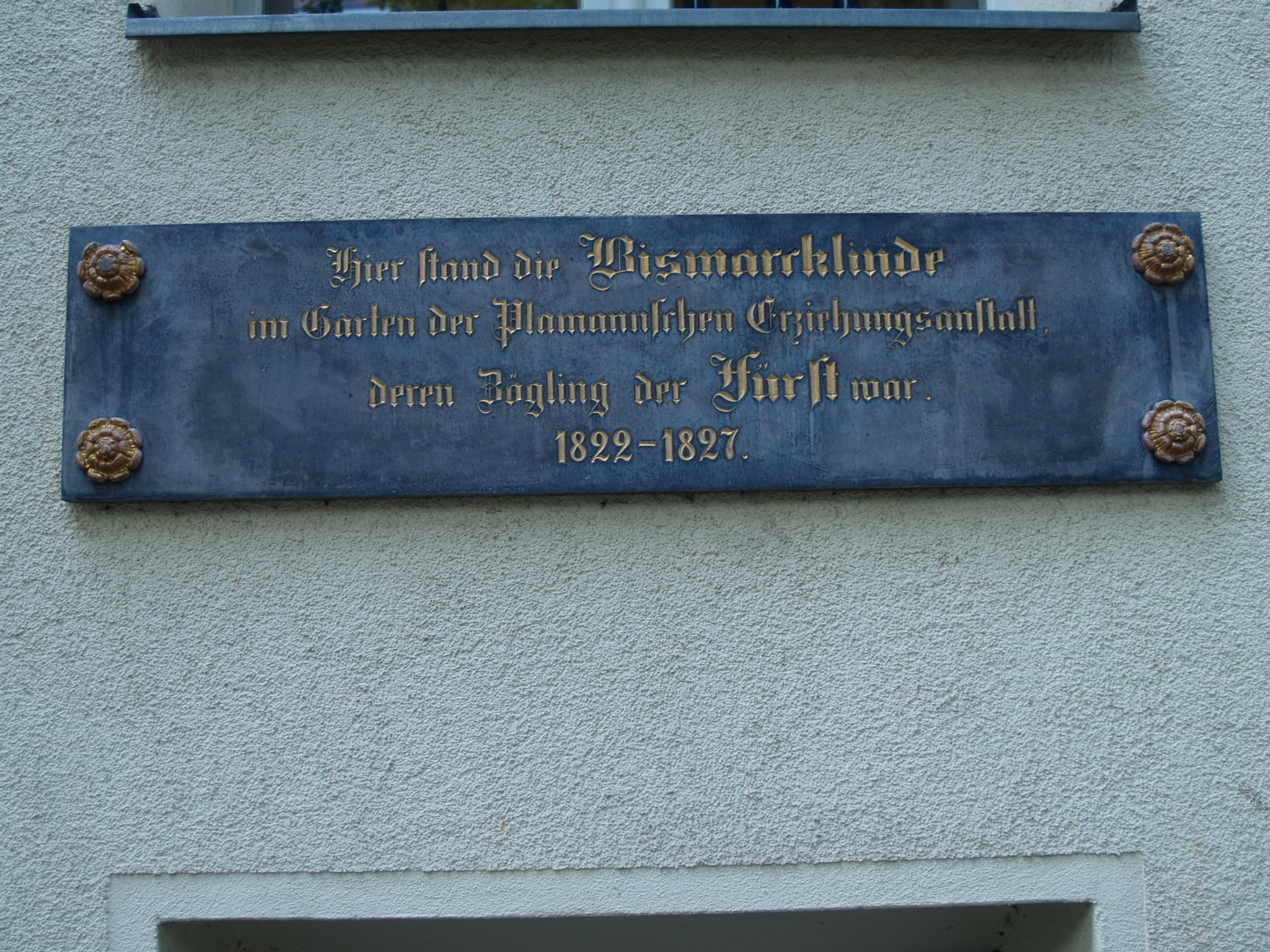
Plaque noting the Bismarck linden in a garden where the Plamann Educational Institute (German: Plamannische Erziehungsanstalt) was located.

Johann Ernst Plamann (22 June 1771, Repzin – 3 September 1834, Berlin) was a German child educator. He based his work on the ideas of Johann Heinrich Pestalozzi and Friedrich Ludwig Jahn. Among his pupils was future German chancellor Otto von Bismarck.

== Biography ==
=== Early learning ===
Plamann attended the Joachimsthal Gymnasium and studied theology at the University of Halle. At the age of 26, he was at Berlin, teaching in private schools, reading Greek and Latin classics. A growing interest in education received an impulse when he made the acquaintance of the poet Christoph August Tiedge, who advised him to read the works of Pestalozzi. Plamann was so deeply impressed by what he read that, in May 1803, he set out for Switzerland with borrowed money, and was cordially received by Pestalozzi. The two men became friends.

=== Institute founding ===
Plamann returned to Berlin, and at once applied for royal permission to establish an institution where the new Swiss system could be introduced. By this time “Leonard and Gertrude” had made its author known in the Prussian capital, and great hopes were founded on Pestalozzi's reformation: the requisite warrant was issued to the applicant before the end of 1803. Plamann's institute opened in the autumn of 1805. The public authorities gave Plamann's enterprise material support, paying him to train students and teachers in the methods that he practised.

Among the teachers were Friedrich Friesen, Friedrich Ludwig Jahn, Wilhelm Harnisch, Karl August Gottlieb Dreist, Ernst Wilhelm Bernhard Eiselen, Karl Friedrich von Klöden, Friedrich Fröbel, and Ernst Ferdinand August. An ardent Pestalozzian, Plamann was sometimes in conflict with subordinates who attached more weight to the fundamental ideas of the new education than to a minute observance of its method, but he would give a free hand to those who showed capacity and life.

Plamann insisted that a boy was to be developed as a whole. Hence gymnastic exercises (those of Jahn and Eiselen) were freely inserted between the lessons. For a particular pupil, instruction was not spread from the outset over all subjects: the number of subjects taken up and the sequence in which they were pursued depended on the progress of the child.

The greatest stress in the educational program was laid on the formation of character. Plamann thought the aim of all education was to bring the training of the mind into harmony with the moral and religious training, which he thought could only be effected if the former is subordinated to the latter. Children were taught a higher regard for what has moral or religious worth than for the most brilliant intellectual achievements.

Plamann's institute was located originally in the middle of Berlin near the castle in the Unterwasserstrasse. The situation was chosen because it was from this quarter that the pupils, children of the higher and richer classes, were expected to be drawn, and, for the most part, actually came. But there was no suitable playground attached, and the boys, to get fresher air, had to walk far through crowded streets. Hence in 1812 a new building was taken near the Halle Gate in the Wilhelmsstrasse (No. 130).

=== Bismarck ===
A pupil who later distinguished himself was Otto von Bismarck. Bismarck learned gymnastics and geometry from Ernst Eiselen; Greek, Latin, and history from Schwarze; French from Le Fèvre; arithmetic from Beetz; writing from Markwort; natural history from Dietrich; singing from Kantor Tiedtke; and geography from Marias Schmidt. Schmidt came to be distinguished from the other Schmidts in Berlin as "Smith to His Majesty" (German: Hofschmidt), tutor to the royal court at Charlottenburg for 25 years. Plamann himself taught Bismarck German, and what is called in German schools religion.

Plamann prepared for the Tertia (the third from the Prima, the highest of the six grades of a Gymnasium), and it was for the Untertertia (the first year of the Tertia's two-year course) that Bismarck left, in 1827, to enter the Friedrich-Wilhelm's Gymnasium. Bismarck is said to have bitterly complained about Plamann's institute as a child. Discipline was strict, and Eiselen and his exercises produced lasting and unpleasant memories in Bismarck's mind.

=== Health ===
During his career, Plamann's ill health kept him busy with physicians, or drove him off to watering places. He was compelled by his health to close the doors of his institute in 1827. A few years later he died. He was buried on 6 September 1834 in the churchyard outside the Halle Gate.
