= William Abbot (politician) =

Member of the Parliament of England

William Abbot (fl. 1437) was an English politician who served as Member of Parliament for Melcombe Regis in 1437. He was the son of John Abbot, another MP, and two of his brothers, John and Robert, were also MPs.
