= John Bassingbourne =

English politician

John Bassingbourne (fl. 1387–1422) was an English politician. He sat as MP for Weymouth in 1385, 1394, 1395, 1407, 1410 and May 1421.

He also served as collector of the court and bailiff of the Earl of March's liberty of Portland before 1391; collector of customs and subsidies in Melcombe from 28 October 1395 till April 1398; bailiff of Weymouth from Michaelmas 1396 till 1397; alnager of Dorset from 23 October 1396 till July 1399.

By 1402, he was married to Isabel.
