= Robert Abbot (politician) =

Member of the Parliament of England

Robert Abbot (fl. 1420–1421) was an English politician who served as Member of Parliament for Melcombe Regis in 1420 and May 1421 and bailiff of Melcombe Regis from September 1415 to 1416, from 1417 to 1419, and from 1421 to 1422. He was a son of John Abbot, another MP, and two of his brothers, John and William, were also MPs.
