= John Hannam (died 1559) =

16th-century English politician

John Hannam or Hammond (died 1559) was an English politician.

Hannam was an MP for Poole in 1547 and Melcombe Regis in November 1554.
