= Michael Prendergast =

Michael Prendergast may refer to:

- Michael Prendergast (songwriter) (fl. 2010s), American songwriter and producer
- Michael Prendergast (MP) (died 1834), Irish politician
- Mike Prendergast (rugby union) (born 1977), Irish rugby union coach and player
- Mike Prendergast (baseball) (1888–1967), pitcher in Major League Baseball
- Micheál Prendergast (c. 1921–1998), Irish farmer, businessman and politician
- Mick Prendergast (1950–2010), English footballer
- Mike Pender (Michael John Prendergast, born 1941), English musician
