= John Avery (MP for Weymouth) =

English politician

John Avery (fl. 1392–1393) was an English politician. He sat as MP for Weymouth in 1393.

He witnessed a deed in Weymouth in April 1392. He may have been related to Geoffrey Avery, royal ranger of the warren of Purbeck in 1389 and Ralph Avery, alnager of Dorset in 1420.
