= Skip Avery =

- Pitcher
- Born: John N. Avery; February 16, 1913; Cranford, New Jersey, U.S.
- Died: January 10, 1977; aged 63; Plainfield, New Jersey, U.S.
- Batted: Unknown Threw: Unknown

Negro league baseball debut
- 1946, for the New York Black Yankees

Last appearance
- 1948, for the New York Black Yankees
- Stats at Baseball Reference

Teams
- New York Black Yankees (1946–1948)

John N. Avery (February 16, 1913 – January 10, 1977) was an American professional baseball pitcher in the Negro leagues. He played with the New York Black Yankees in 1946, 1947 and 1948.

== Early life and career ==
Prior to his Negro league career, Avery pitched for the Colored All-Stars of Plainfield, New Jersey in 1936, and for the Marino A.C. of Plainfield from 1941 through 1942. During the latter season, he also played second base in at least one game.

In 1954, Avery managed the Plainfield Barons of the City Twilight Baseball League.
