= Friedrich Ludwig Jahn =

German Prussian gymnastics educator and nationalist (1778–1852)

Johann Friedrich Ludwig Christoph Jahn
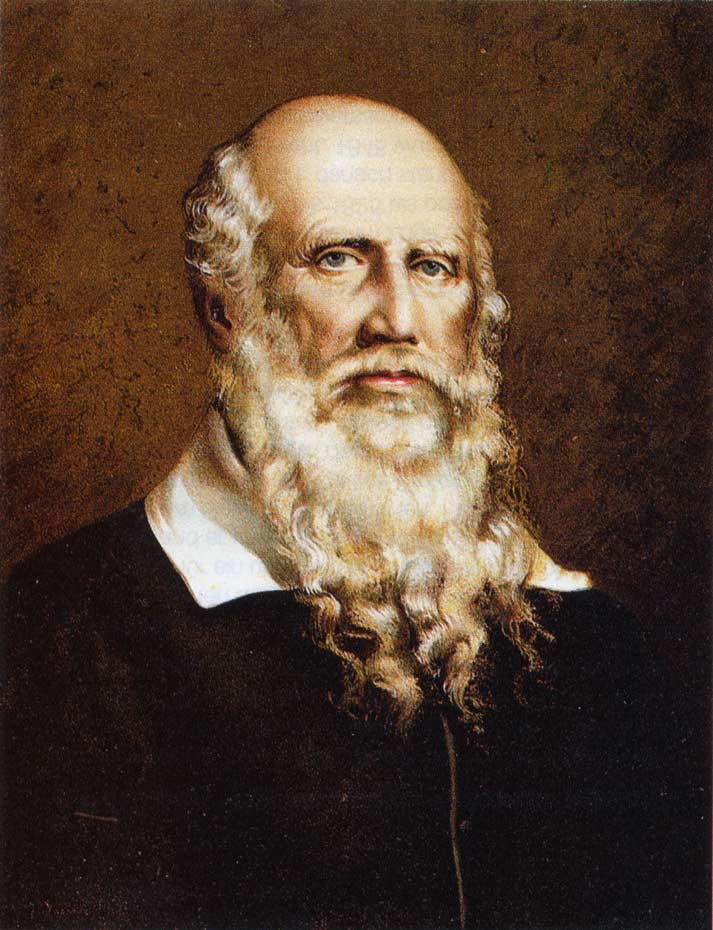
- Lithograph by Georg Engelbach, c. 1852
- Born: 11 August 1778; Lanz, Province of Brandenburg, Prussia
- Died: 15 October 1852 (aged 74); Freyburg, Province of Saxony, Prussia
- Other name: "Turnvater Jahn"
- Occupations: Gymnastics educator and nationalist

Johann Friedrich Ludwig Christoph Jahn (German pronunciation: [ˈjoːhan ˈfʁiːdʁɪç ˈluːtvɪç ˈkʁɪstɔf ˈjaːn]; 11 August 1778 – 15 October 1852) was a German gymnastics educator and nationalist whose writing is credited with the founding of the German gymnastics (Turner) movement, first realized at Volkspark Hasenheide in Berlin, the origin of modern sports clubs, as well as influencing the German Campaign of 1813, during which a coalition of German states effectively ended the occupation by Napoleon's First French Empire. His admirers know him as "Turnvater Jahn", roughly meaning "Father of Gymnastics Jahn". Jahn invented the parallel bars, rings, high bar, the pommel horse and the vault horse.

== Life ==
Jahn was born in the village of Lanz in Brandenburg, Prussia. He studied theology and philology from 1796 to 1802 at the universities in Halle, Göttingen, and Greifswald. After the Battle of Jena–Auerstedt in 1806, he joined the Prussian army. In 1809, he went to Berlin where he became a teacher at the Gymnasium zum Grauen Kloster and at the Plamann School.

Brooding upon what he saw as the humiliation of his native land by Napoleon, Jahn conceived the idea of restoring the spirits of his countrymen by the development of their physical and moral powers through the practice of gymnastics. The first Turnplatz, or open-air gymnasium, was opened by Jahn in Hasenheide in the south of Berlin in 1811, and the Turnverein (gymnastics association) movement spread rapidly. Young gymnasts were taught to regard themselves as members of a kind of guild for the emancipation of their fatherland. The nationalistic spirit was nourished to a significant degree by the writings of Jahn.

In early 1813 Jahn took an active part in the formation of the famous Lützow Free Corps, a volunteer force in the Prussian army fighting Napoleon. He commanded a battalion of the corps, but he was often employed in the secret service during the same period. After the war, he returned to Berlin, where he was appointed state teacher of gymnastics, and he took on a role in the formation of the student patriotic fraternities, or Burschenschaften, in Jena.

A man of a populistic nature, rugged, eccentric and outspoken, Jahn often came into conflict with the authorities. The authorities eventually realized he aimed at establishing a united Germany and that his Turner schools were political and liberal clubs. The conflict resulted in the closing of the Turnplatz in 1819 and Jahn's arrest. Kept in semi-confinement successively at Spandau, Küstrin, and at the fortress in Kolberg until 1824, he was sentenced to imprisonment for two years. The sentence was reversed in 1825, but he was forbidden to live within ten miles of Berlin.

He therefore took up residence at Freyburg on the Unstrut, where he remained until his death, except for a short period in 1828, when he was exiled to Kölleda on a charge of sedition. While at Freyburg, he received an invitation to become professor of German literature at Cambridge, Massachusetts, which he declined, saying that "deer and hares love to live where they are most hunted."

In 1840, Jahn was decorated by the Prussian government with the Iron Cross for bravery in the wars against Napoleon. In the spring of 1848, he was elected by the district of Naumburg to the German National Parliament. Jahn died in 1852 in Freyburg, where a monument was erected in his honor in 1859.

Jahn popularized the four Fs motto "frisch, fromm, fröhlich, frei" ("fresh, pious, cheerful, free") in the early 19th century.

== Works ==
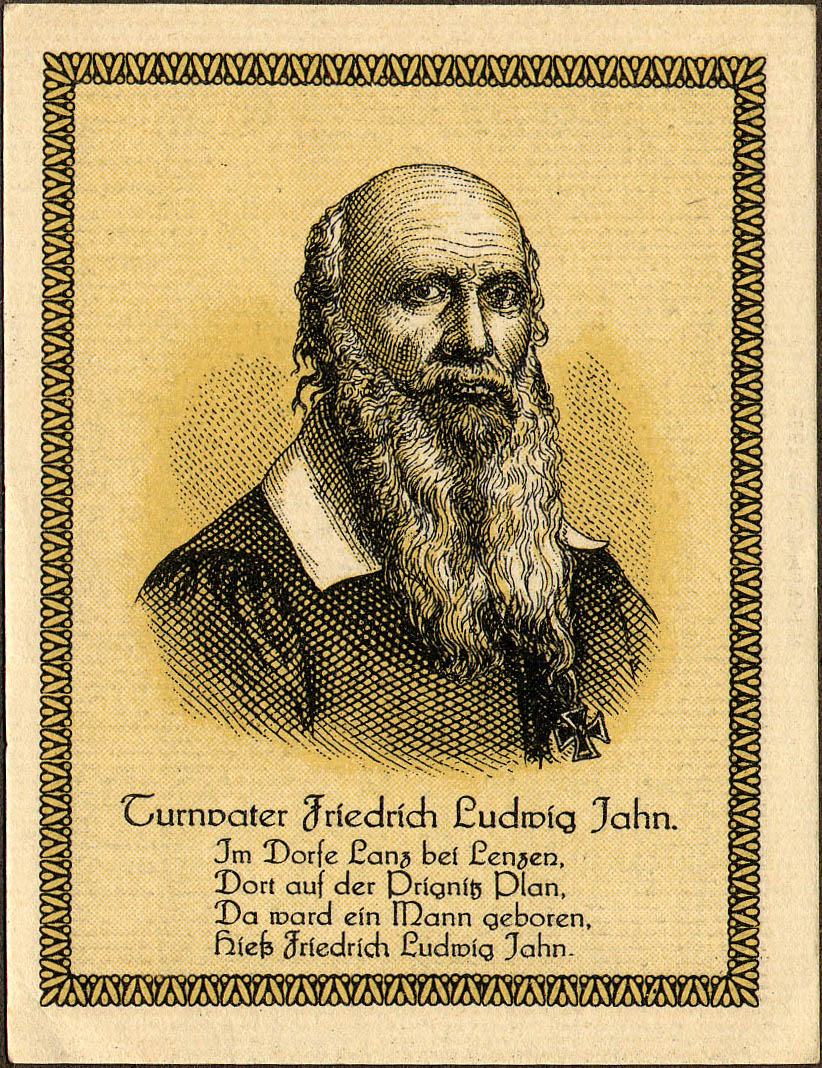
Jahn on a German Notgeld bill from 1922 issues in Lenzen

Among his works are the following:

- Bereicherung des hochdeutschen Sprachschatzes (Leipzig, 1806),
- Deutsches Volkstum (Lübeck, 1810),
- Runenblätter (Frankfurt, 1814),
- Die Deutsche Turnkunst (Berlin, 1816)
- Neue Runenblätter (Naumburg, 1828),
- Merke zum deutschen Volkstum (Hildburghausen, 1833), and
- Selbstverteidigung (Leipzig, 1863).

A complete edition of his works appeared at Hof in 1884–1887. See the biography by Schultheiss (Berlin, 1894), and Jahn als Erzieher, by Friedric (Munich, 1895).

== Contribution to physical education ==
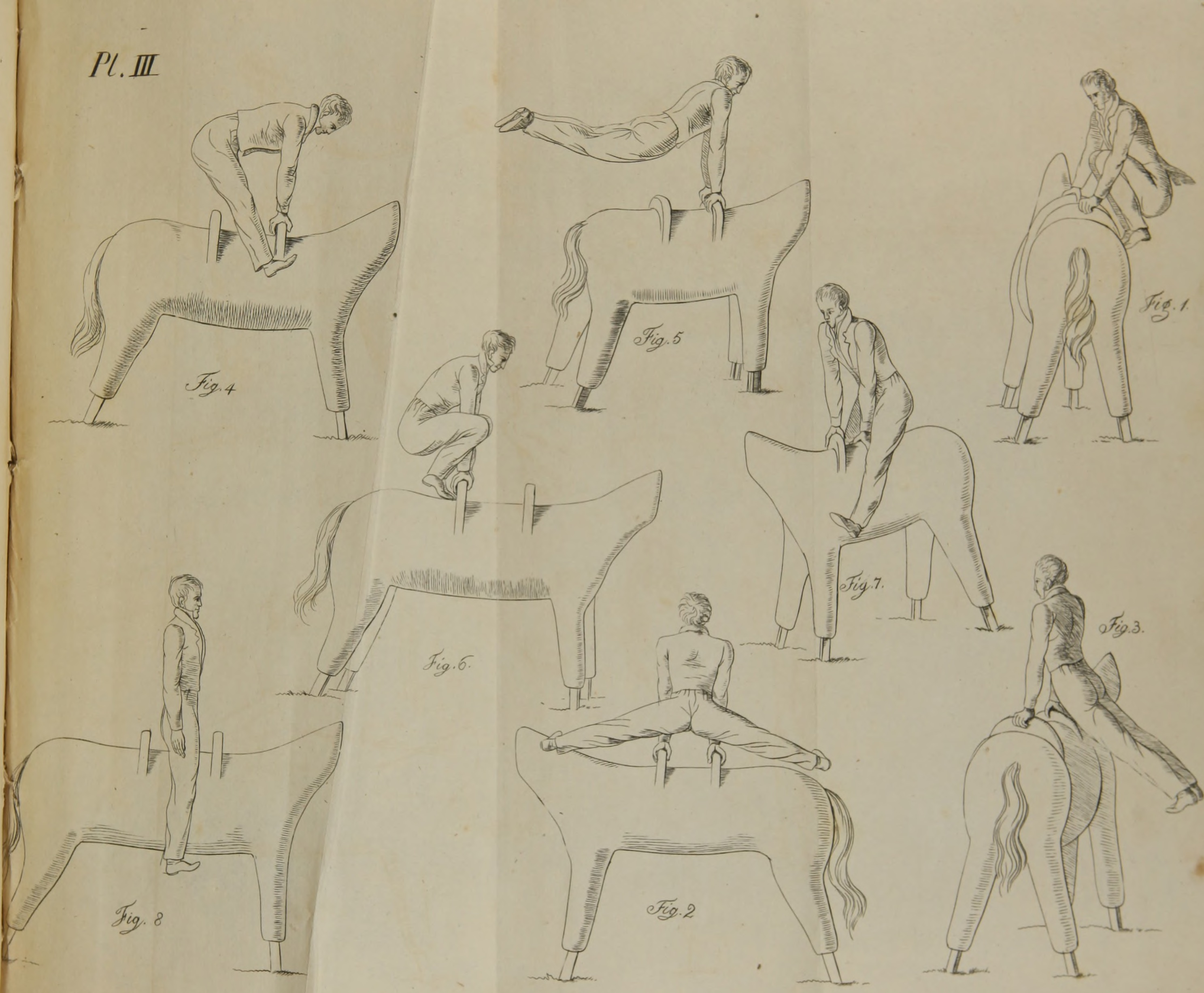
Illustrations of pommel horse exercises in an English translation of Jahn's Treatise on Gymnasticks, 1828

Jahn promoted the use of parallel bars, rings and the high bar in international competition. In honor and memory of him, some gymnastic clubs, called Turnvereine, took up his name, the most well known of these is probably the SSV Jahn Regensburg.

Gymnastics classes inspired by Jahn's turnplatz design started opening in the United States in 1825 under the expertise and advocacy of Germans Charles Beck and Charles Follen, as well as American John Neal. Beck opened the first gymnasium in the US in 1825 at the Round Hill School in Northampton, Massachusetts. Follen opened the first college gymnasium and the first public gymnasium in the US in Massachusetts in 1826 at Harvard College and in nearby Boston, respectively. Neal was the first American to open a public gymnasium in the US in Portland, Maine in 1827. During this period, Neal spread Jahn's concepts in the US in the American Journal of Education and The Yankee, helping to establish the American branch of the movement.

A memorial to Jahn exists in St. Louis, Missouri, within its Forest Park. It features a large bust of Jahn in the center of an arc of stone, with statues of a male and female gymnast, one on each end of the arc. The monument is on the edge of Art Hill next to the path running north and south along the western edge of Post-Dispatch Lake. It is directly north of the St. Louis Zoo. On the plaque below his bronze bust, Friedrich Ludwig Jahn is given credit as "The Father of Systematic Physical Culture".

Other memorials to Jahn are located in Groß-Gerau, Germany; Vienna; and Cincinnati, Ohio's Inwood Park in the Mount Auburn Historic District. An elementary school in Chicago, is named after Jahn.

== Criticism ==
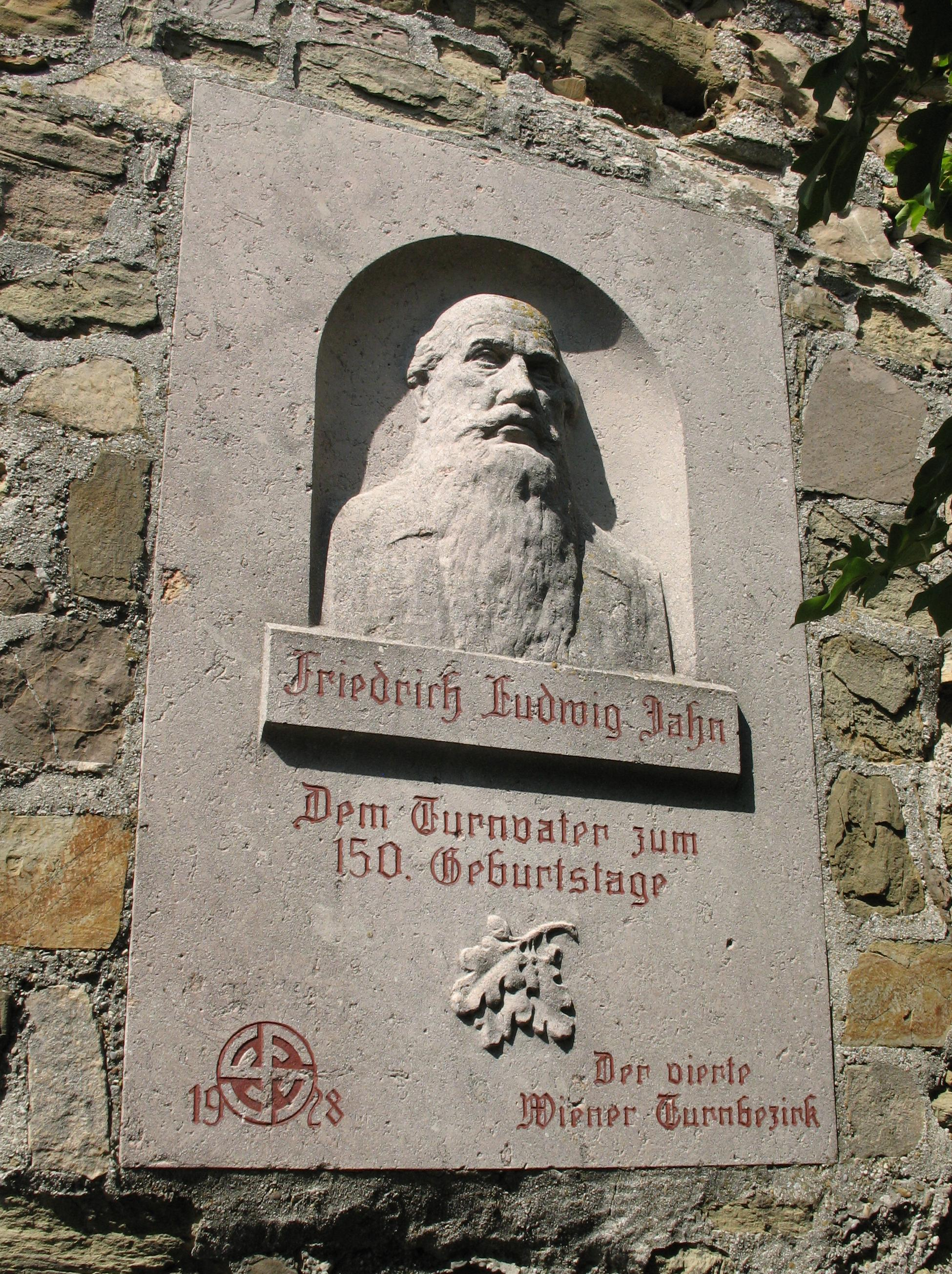
Memorial in Vienna

In his own time Friedrich Jahn was seen by both supporters and opponents as a liberal figure. He advocated that the German states should unite after the withdrawal of Napoleon's occupying armies and establish a democratic constitution under the Hohenzollern monarchy, which would include the right to free speech. As a German nationalist, Jahn advocated maintaining German language and culture against foreign influence. In 1810 he wrote, "Poles, French, priests, aristocrats and Jews are Germany's misfortune." At the time Jahn wrote this, the German states were occupied by foreign armies under the leadership of Napoleon. Also, Jahn was "the guiding spirit" of the fanatic book burning episode carried out by revolutionary students at the Wartburg festival in 1817.

Scholarly focus on the völkischness of Jahn's thought started in the 1920s with a new generation of Jahn interpreters like Edmund Neuendorff and Karl Müller. Neuendorff explicitly linked Jahn with National Socialism. The equation by the National Socialists of Jahn's ideas with their world view was more or less complete by the mid-1930s. Alfred Baeumler, an educational philosopher and university lecturer who attempted to provide theoretical support for Nazi ideology (through the interpretation of Nietzsche among others) wrote a monograph on Jahn in which he characterized Jahn's invention of gymnastics as an explicitly political project, designed to create the ultimate völkisch citizen by educating his body.

Jahn gained infamy in English-speaking countries following the publication of Peter Viereck's Metapolitics: The Roots of the Nazi Mind (1941). Viereck claimed Jahn was the spiritual founder of Nazism who inspired early German romantics with anti-Semitic and authoritarian doctrines, influencing Wagner and finally, the Nazis. In a review of Viereck's book Jacques Barzun observed that Viereck's portrait of cultural trends supposedly leading to Nazism was "a caricature without resemblance" relying on "misleading shortcuts." Viereck's response in the same issue points out that it is clear from Barzun's remarks that Barzun did not read far into the book.

== See also ==
- Turners
- SSV Jahn Regensburg
