= Henry Barbour (MP for Melcombe Regis) =

English politician of the 15th century

Henry Barbour (fl. 1414), of Melcombe Regis, Dorset, was an English politician.

He was a member (MP) of the parliament of England for Melcombe Regis in April 1414.
