= John Alysaundre =

Member of the Parliament of England

John Alysaundre of Charmouth was an English politician who was MP for Melcombe Regis in December 1421 and Lyme Regis in 1432.
