= John Wadham (MP) =

English politician

Member of Parliament for Weymouth and Melcombe Regis
- In office March 1553 – April 1554

Personal details
- Born: 1520
- Died: 14 March 1584 (aged 63–64)

John Wadham (c. 1520 – 14 March 1584) was an English politician who served as a Member of Parliament (MP) for Weymouth and Melcombe Regis.
