= John Cornelius (MP) =

16th-century English politician

John Cornelius alias Cornellys alias Johnson alias Welbored (died 1567), was an English politician.

He was a member (MP) of the parliament of England for Weymouth in 1547.
