= Jack Avery =

Jack Avery may refer to:

- Henry Every (alias "Jack Avery", 1659–after 1699), English pirate
- Jack William Avery (1911–1940), British War Reserve Constable who was murdered in Hyde Park, London
- Jack Avery (singer) (born 1999), American singer and member of the U.S. pop boy band Why Don't We
