= Richard Hurst (cricketer) =

English cricketer

Personal information
- Full name: Richard Hurst
- Born: 1818; Cowley, Oxfordshire, England
- Died: 1873 (aged 54–55); Headington, Oxfordshire, England
- Batting: Unknown

Domestic team information
- Years: Team
- 1843: Oxford University

Career statistics
| Competition | First-class |
|---|---|
| Matches | 1 |
| Runs scored | 20 |
| Batting average | 10.00 |
| 100s/50s | –/– |
| Top score | 12 |
| Catches/stumpings | 1/– |
- Source: Cricinfo, 24 June 2020

Richard Hurst (1818 – 1873) was an English first-class cricketer.

Hurst was born at Cowley in 1818. He made a single appearance in first-class cricket for Oxford University against the Marylebone Cricket Club (MCC) at Lord's in 1843, though his overall association with the University of Oxford is unknown. Batting twice against the MCC, he was dismissed for 8 runs in the Oxford first innings by Jemmy Dean, while in their second innings he was dismissed by the same bowler for 12 runs. Playing in the same Oxford side were possible relations John Hurst and Edmund Hurst. He died at Headington in 1873.
