= Weymouth and Melcombe Regis (constituency) =

Former parliamentary constituency in the United Kingdom

- Former borough constituency for the House of Commons

1570–1885
- Seats: four (1570–1832), two (1832–1885)
- Replaced by: South Dorset

Weymouth and Melcombe Regis was a parliamentary borough in Dorset represented in the English House of Commons, later in that of Great Britain, and finally in the Parliament of the United Kingdom. It was formed by the Union of Weymouth and Melcombe Regis Act 1571 (13 Eliz. 1. c. 9 Pr.) which amalgamated the existing boroughs of Weymouth and Melcombe Regis. Until 1832, the combined borough continued to elect the four Members of Parliament (MPs) to which its constituent parts had previously been entitled; the Great Reform Act reduced its representation to two Members, and the constituency was abolished altogether in 1885, becoming part of the new South Dorset constituency.

== Members of Parliament ==
=== Members for Weymouth (1348–1570) ===
Parliament	First member	Second member
1386	John Gosselyn	John Hughelot
1388 (Feb)	John Wake	Henry Hert
1388 (Sep)	Thomas Dovere	John James
1390 (Jan)	Philip Brice	Robert Gilbert
1390 (Nov)		
1391	Philip Brice	John James
1393	Henry Badecok	John Avery
1394	John Bassingbourne	William Glover
1395	John Bassingbourne	Stephen Russell
1397 (Jan)	Thomas Cole	John Fleet
1397 (Sep)	William Ford	Nicholas Crabbe
1399	John Brice	William Clerk
1401		
1402	Robert Penne	William Faringdon
1404 (Jan)		
1404 (Oct)		
1406	Peter Dille	William Rose I
1407	John Alday	John Bassingbourne
1410	Thomas Payn	John Bassingbourne
1411		
1413 (Feb)		
1413 (May)	Robert Penne	John Wydeford
1414 (Apr)	Thomas Payn	John Wodham
1414 (Nov)	John James	John Wodham
1415		
1416 (Mar)		
1416 (Oct)		
1417	John Brice	Robert Penne
1419	Robert Hillary	Robert Penne
1420	Robert Hillary	Robert Penne
1421 (May)	John Bassingbourne	Robert Penne
1421 (Dec)	William Payn	John Penne
1423	John Abbot	
1442	Henry Russell	Walter Cheverell
1450	John Troutbeck	
1472-5	William Twynyho	
1510–1523	No names known	
1529	William Bond	Robert Aley
1536	?	
1539	?	
1542	William Aubrey	Richard Jenour
1545	Roger Stourton	Richard Duke
1547	John Cornelius alias Johnson alias Welbored	John Brace
1553 (Mar)	?Richard Phelips	?
1553 (Oct)	Thomas Samways	John Jordan alias Blancombe
1554 (Apr)	John Wadham	John Williams
1554 (Nov)	John Phelips	William Randall
1555	John Buller	Thomas Hobbs
1558	Thomas Keynell	John Cattell
1559	Thomas Fitzwilliams	John Fowler
1562–3	Robert Eyre	Reginald Gray

=== Members for Melcombe Regis (1319–1570) ===
Parliament	First member	Second member
1386	Henry Ford	John Northovere
1388 (Feb)	Henry Ford	Thomas Russell
1388 (Sep)	Thomas Walsh	Richard Morys
1390 (Jan)	John Northovere	Thomas Russell
1390 (Nov)		
1391	John Northovere	John Kete
1393	John Abbot	Robert Veel
1394	Robert Calche	Robert Veel
1395	Robert Calche	William Helier
1397 (Jan)	Robert Calche	Henry Ford
1397 (Sep)	William Helier	William Coventre II
1399	Thomas Cole	Eustace Kymer
1401		
1402	John Wyot	William Fowler
1404 (Jan)	Robert Penne	William Helier
1404 (Oct)		
1406	Richard Hurst	William Clerk
1407	Thomas Cole	Eustace Kymer
1410	John Ford	(_) Lane
1411		
1413 (Feb)		
1413 (May)	Ralph Burnage	Thomas Lond
1414 (Apr)	Henry Barbour	Ralph Burnage
1414 (Nov)	William Pyne	William Helier
1415		
1416 (Mar)		
1416 (Oct)		
1417	Nicholas Pury	John Gardener
1419	Ralph Burnage	Walter Reson
1420	William Walkeden	Robert Abbot
1421 (May)	William Benefeld	Robert Abbot
1421 (Dec)	William Walkeden or Nicholas Moigne	John Alysaundre
1437	William Abbot	
1510–1523	No names known	
1529	Richard Phelips	Oliver Lawrence
1536	?	
1539	?	
1542	?	
1545	Anthony Cokett	Thomas Poley
1547	Thomas Phelips	John Leweston
1553 (Mar)	John Wadham	?Owen Reynolds
1553 (Oct)	John Leweston	Owen Reynolds
1554 (Apr)	Richard Mitchell	Thomas Samways
1554 (Nov)	Thomas Phelips	John Hannam
1555	John Leweston	William Crowche
1558	John Mill	Richard Shaw
1559	John Maynes	Richard Shaw
1563-7	Thomas Colby	William Mere

=== Members for Weymouth and Melcombe Regis (1570–1885) ===
==== 1570–1629 ====
Parliament	First member	Second member	Third member	Fourth member
Parliament of 1571	Thomas Hussey d. by 1581; Then replaced by Laurence Thompson	Richard Tomlinson	Ralph Browne	Gwyn Reynolds
Parliament of 1572–1581	Thomas Hussey d. by 1581; Then replaced by Laurence Thompson	John Wolley	Richard Bedell died 1576 replaced by Moyle Finch	Thomas Hanham
Parliament of 1584–1585	Thomas Hussey d. by 1581; Then replaced by Laurence Thompson	Francis Bacon replaced by 1586 Edward Bacon	George Grenville	Edward Penruddock
Parliament of 1586–1587	Thomas Hussey d. by 1581; Then replaced by Laurence Thompson	Francis Bacon replaced by 1586 Edward Bacon	William Sprynt	Edward Phelips
Parliament of 1588–1589	William Mill	Robert Gregory	Arthur Messenger	William Hody
Parliament of 1593	William Weston	Thomas Stafford	Arthur Messenger	Thomas Stevens
Parliament of 1597–1598	Richard Swayne	Francis Leigh	John Mockett	John Brooke
Parliament of 1601	John Peyton	Walter Cope	Richard Swayne	Edward Reynolds
Parliament of 1604–1611	Thomas Barefoot died replaced 1610 by Viscount Cranborne	Robert Myddelton	Robert White Vacated seat replaced 1610 by Barnard Michell	Sir John Hanham
Addled Parliament (1614)	Sir Charles Caesar	Robert Bateman	Robert White Vacated seat replaced 1610 by Barnard Michell	John Roy
Parliament of 1621–1622	Matthew Pitt; Died 1624 replaced in 1624 by (Sir) Thomas Myddelton	Giles Green	John Freke	Christopher Erle
Happy Parliament (1624–1625)	Matthew Pitt; Died 1624 replaced in 1624 by (Sir) Thomas Myddelton	Arthur Pyne	John Freke	Thomas Giear
Useless Parliament (1625)	Barnard Michell	Arthur Pyne	(Sir) John Strangways	Giles Green
Parliament of 1625–1626	Barnard Michell	Arthur Pyne	(Sir) John Strangways	Giles Green
Parliament of 1628–1629	Hugh Pyne	Sir Robert Napier	Lewis Dyve	Henry Waltham
No Parliament summoned 1629–1640

==== 1640–1832 ====
Year	First member	Party	Second member	Party	Third member	Party	Fourth member	Party
April 1640	(Sir) John Strangways	Royalist	Giles Strangways	Royalist	Richard King	Royalist	Thomas Gyard	
November 1640	(Sir) John Strangways	Royalist	(Sir) Gerrard Napier	Royalist	Richard King	Royalist	Sir Walter Erle	Parliamentarian
September 1642	Strangways disabled from sitting – seat vacant		(Sir) Gerrard Napier	Royalist	Richard King	Royalist	Sir Walter Erle	Parliamentarian
February 1643	Strangways disabled from sitting – seat vacant		(Sir) Gerrard Napier	Royalist	King disabled from sitting – seat vacant		Sir Walter Erle	Parliamentarian
January 1644	Strangways disabled from sitting – seat vacant		Napier disabled from sitting – seat vacant		King disabled from sitting – seat vacant		Sir Walter Erle	Parliamentarian
1645	William Sydenham		John Bond		Matthew Allen		Sir Walter Erle	Parliamentarian
December 1648	William Sydenham		Erle, Allen and Bond all excluded in Pride's Purge – seats vacant					
1653	Weymouth and Melcombe Regis was unrepresented in the Barebones Parliament							
1654	Denis Bond		Weymouth and Melcombe Regis had only one seat in the First and Second Parliaments of the Protectorate					
1656	Denis Bond		Weymouth and Melcombe Regis had only one seat in the First and Second Parliaments of the Protectorate					
January 1659	John Trenchard		Walden Lagoe		John Clark		Peter Middleton	
May 1659	William Sydenham		Three seats vacant					
April 1660	Edward Montagu		Sir William Penn		Peter Middleton		Henry Waltham	
June 1660	Bullen Reymes		Sir William Penn		Peter Middleton		Henry Waltham	
1661	Bullen Reymes		Sir William Penn		Winston Churchill		Sir John Strangways	
1667	Bullen Reymes		Sir William Penn		Winston Churchill		Sir John Coventry	
1670	Bullen Reymes		Lord Ashley		Winston Churchill		Sir John Coventry	
1673	John Man		Lord Ashley		Winston Churchill		Sir John Coventry	
February 1679	Thomas Browne		Lord Ashley		Michael Harvey		Sir John Coventry	
August 1679	Thomas Browne		Sir John Morton		Michael Harvey		Sir John Coventry	
1680	Henry Henning		Sir John Morton		Michael Harvey		Sir John Coventry	
1685	Henry Henning		Sir John Morton		Francis Mohun		George Strangways	
1689	Henry Henning		Sir John Morton		Michael Harvey		Sir Robert Napier	
1690	Henry Henning		Sir John Morton		Michael Harvey		Nicholas Gould	
1691	Henry Henning		Sir John Morton		Michael Harvey		Thomas Freke	
1695	Maurice Ashley		John Knight		Michael Harvey		Thomas Freke	
March 1698	Maurice Ashley		Philip Taylor		Michael Harvey		Thomas Freke	
August 1698	Arthur Shallett		Philip Taylor		Michael Harvey		Thomas Freke	
January 1701	Henry Thynne		Charles Churchill		Michael Harvey		Maurice Ashley	
November 1701	George St Loe		Charles Churchill		Sir Christopher Wren		Maurice Ashley	
February 1702	George St Loe		Charles Churchill		Sir Christopher Wren		Anthony Henley	
July 1702	George St Loe		Charles Churchill		Henry Thynne		Anthony Henley	
1705	Maurice Ashley		Charles Churchill		Henry Thynne		Anthony Henley	
1709	Maurice Ashley		Charles Churchill		Edward Clavell		Anthony Henley	
1710	Maurice Ashley		James Littleton	Whig	William Betts		Anthony Henley	
May 1711	Maurice Ashley		Sir Thomas Hardy	Tory	William Harvey	Tory	Anthony Henley	
December 1711	Maurice Ashley		Sir Thomas Hardy	Tory	William Harvey	Tory	Reginald Marriott	
1713	John Baker		Rear-Admiral James Littleton	Whig	Lieutenant-General Daniel Harvey	Whig	William Betts	
1714	Sir Thomas Hardy	Tory	Rear-Admiral James Littleton	Whig	William Harvey	Tory	Reginald Marriott	
1715	John Baker		Thomas Littleton		Lieutenant-General Daniel Harvey	Whig	William Betts	
1717	Edward Harrison		Thomas Littleton		Lieutenant-General Daniel Harvey	Whig	William Betts	
1722	Sir James Thornhill		Thomas Pearse		John Ward		William Betts	
1726	Sir James Thornhill		Thomas Pearse		John Willes		William Betts	
January 1727	Sir James Thornhill		Edward Tucker		John Willes		William Betts	
August 1727	Sir James Thornhill		Edward Tucker		Thomas Pearse		William Betts	
1730	Sir James Thornhill		Edward Tucker		Thomas Pearse		George Dodington	
1734	George Bubb Dodington		Edward Tucker		Thomas Pearse		George Dodington	
1735	John Tucker		Edward Tucker		Thomas Pearse		George Dodington	
1737	John Tucker		John Olmius		Thomas Pearse		George Dodington	
1741	John Tucker		Joseph Damer		John Raymond		James Steuart	
1747	Welbore Ellis		Richard Plumer		George Dodington		Edmund Hungate Beaghan	
1751	Welbore Ellis		Lord George Cavendish		George Dodington		Edmund Hungate Beaghan	
1754	Welbore Ellis		Lord John Cavendish		George Dodington		John Tucker	
1761	Sir Francis Dashwood		John Olmius		Richard Glover		John Tucker	
1762	Sir Francis Dashwood		Richard Jackson		Richard Glover		John Tucker	
1763	Charles Walcott		Richard Jackson		Richard Glover		John Tucker	
1768	The Lord Waltham		Sir Charles Davers		Jeremiah Dyson		John Tucker	
1774	Welbore Ellis		William Chaffin Grove		John Purling		John Tucker	
1778	Welbore Ellis		William Chaffin Grove		John Purling		Gabriel Steward	
September 1780	Welbore Ellis		William Chaffin Grove		John Purling		Warren Lisle	
November 1780	Welbore Ellis		William Chaffin Grove		John Purling		Gabriel Steward	
1781	Welbore Ellis		William Richard Rumbold		John Purling		Gabriel Steward	
1784	Welbore Ellis		Sir Thomas Rumbold		John Purling		Gabriel Steward	
1786	Welbore Ellis		Sir Thomas Rumbold		John Purling		George Jackson	
1788	Welbore Ellis		Sir Thomas Rumbold		John Purling		Gabriel Steward	
1790	Colonel Sir James Murray	Tory	(Sir) Richard Bempde Johnstone		Andrew Stuart		Thomas Jones	
1791	Colonel Sir James Murray	Tory	(Sir) Richard Bempde Johnstone		Andrew Stuart		Lieutenant-Colonel Sir James Johnstone	
1794	Colonel Sir James Murray	Tory	(Sir) Richard Bempde Johnstone		Andrew Stuart		Gabriel Tucker Steward	Tory
1796	Colonel Sir James Murray	Tory	William Garthshore	Tory	Andrew Stuart		Gabriel Tucker Steward	Tory
1801	Colonel Sir James Murray	Tory	William Garthshore	Tory	Charles Adams	Tory	Gabriel Tucker Steward	Tory
1806	Colonel Sir James Murray	Tory	Richard Augustus Tucker Steward	Tory	Charles Adams	Tory	Gabriel Tucker Steward	Tory
1810	Colonel Sir James Murray	Tory	Richard Augustus Tucker Steward	Tory	Charles Adams	Tory	Sir John Lowther Johnstone	
1811	General Sir John Murray		Richard Augustus Tucker Steward	Tory	Charles Adams	Tory	Sir John Lowther Johnstone	
January 1812	General Sir John Murray		Richard Augustus Tucker Steward	Tory	Charles Adams	Tory	Joseph Hume	Tory
October 1812	General Sir John Murray		John Broadhurst	Whig	Thomas Wallace		Henry Trail	
1813	General Sir John Murray		Viscount Cranborne	Tory	Christopher Idle	Tory	Masterton Ure	Tory
1817	General Sir John Murray		Adolphus Dalrymple	Tory	Christopher Idle	Tory	Masterton Ure	Tory
1818	William Williams	Whig	Fowell Buxton	Whig	Thomas Wallace	Tory	Masterton Ure	Tory
1826	Colonel John Gordon	Tory	Fowell Buxton	Whig	Thomas Wallace	Tory	Masterton Ure	Tory
1828	Colonel John Gordon	Tory	Fowell Buxton	Whig	Edward Sugden	Tory	Masterton Ure	Tory
May 1831	Colonel John Gordon	Tory	Fowell Buxton	Whig	Richard Weyland	Whig	Masterton Ure	Tory
August 1831	Colonel John Gordon	Tory	Fowell Buxton	Whig	Charles Baring Wall	Tory	Masterton Ure	Tory
1832	Representation reduced to two Members							

==== 1832–1885 ====
Year	First member	First party	Second member	Second party
1832	Sir Frederick Johnstone	Tory	Fowell Buxton	Whig
1834	Sir Frederick Johnstone	Conservative	Fowell Buxton	Whig
1835	William Burdon	Whig	Fowell Buxton	Whig
1837	Viscount Villiers	Conservative	George William Hope	Conservative
1842	Ralph Bernal	Whig	William Dougal Christie	Whig
August 1847	William Freestun	Whig	William Dougal Christie	Whig
December 1847	William Freestun	Whig	Hon. Frederick Child Villiers	Conservative
1852	William Freestun	Whig	George Butt	Conservative
1857	William Freestun	Whig	Robert Campbell	Whig
1859	Robert Brooks	Conservative	Viscount Grey de Wilton	Conservative
1865	Robert Brooks	Conservative	Henry Gridley	Liberal
1867	Robert Brooks	Conservative	Henry Edwards	Liberal
1868	Charles J. T. Hambro	Conservative	Henry Edwards	Liberal
1874	Sir Frederick Johnstone	Conservative	Henry Edwards	Liberal
1885	Constituency abolished			

== Election results ==
=== Elections in the 1830s ===
General election 1830: Weymouth and Melcombe Regis
Party	Candidate	Votes	%
Whig	Fowell Buxton	Unopposed	
Tory	John Gordon	Unopposed	
Tory	Masterton Ure	Unopposed	
Tory	Edward Sugden	Unopposed	
Whig hold			
Tory hold			
Tory hold			
Tory hold			

General election 1831: Weymouth and Melcombe Regis
Party	Candidate	Votes	%
Whig	Richard Weyland	14	23.7
Tory	Masterton Ure	13	22.0
Tory	John Gordon	13	22.0
Whig	Fowell Buxton	13	22.0
Tory	Michael Prendergast	2	3.4
Whig	Henry William Tancred	2	3.4
Whig	Thomas Bulkeley	2	3.4
Turnout		c. 15	c. 2.1
Registered electors		c. 700	
Majority		1	1.7
Whig gain from Tory			
Majority		0	0.0
Tory hold			
Tory hold			
Majority		11	18.6
Whig hold			

Weyland was also elected for Oxfordshire and opted to sit there, causing a by-election.

By-election, 1 August 1831: Weymouth and Melcombe Regis
Party	Candidate	Votes	%	±%
Tory	Charles Baring Wall	425	72.0	+24.6
Whig	Michael Prendergast	165	28.0	−24.5
Majority		260	44.0	+44.0
Turnout		590	c. 84.3	c. +82.2
Registered electors		c. 700		
Tory gain from Whig		Swing	+24.6	

Representation reduced to two members.

General election 1832: Weymouth and Melcombe Regis
Party	Candidate	Votes	%	±%
Whig	Fowell Buxton	238	28.3	+2.1
Tory	Frederick Johnstone	215	25.5	+1.8
Whig	William Burdon	214	25.4	−0.9
Tory	George Bankes	176	20.9	−2.8
Turnout		431	90.7	c. +88.6
Registered electors		475		
Majority		23	2.8	+1.1
Whig hold		Swing	+1.3	
Majority		1	0.1	+0.1
Tory hold		Swing	+0.6	

General election 1835: Weymouth and Melcombe Regis
Party	Candidate	Votes	%	±%
Whig	Fowell Buxton	268	40.8	+12.5
Whig	William Burdon	239	36.4	+11.0
Conservative	George Child Villiers	150	22.8	−23.6
Majority		89	13.6	+10.8
Turnout		c. 329	c. 63.4	c. −27.3
Registered electors		518		
Whig hold		Swing	+12.2	
Whig gain from Conservative		Swing	+11.4	

General election 1837: Weymouth and Melcombe Regis
Party	Candidate	Votes	%	±%
Conservative	George Child Villiers	291	31.6	+20.2
Conservative	George William Hope	268	29.1	+17.7
Whig	Fowell Buxton	211	22.9	−17.9
Whig	George Stephen	151	16.4	−20.0
Majority		57	6.2	N/A
Turnout		481	81.7	c. +18.3
Registered electors		589		
Conservative gain from Whig		Swing	+19.6	
Conservative gain from Whig		Swing	+18.3	

=== Elections in the 1840s ===
General election 1841: Weymouth and Melcombe Regis
Party	Candidate	Votes	%	±%
Conservative	George Child Villiers	259	25.4	−6.2
Conservative	George William Hope	257	25.2	−3.9
Whig	Ralph Bernal	254	24.9	+2.0
Whig	William Dougal Christie	251	24.6	+8.2
Majority		3	0.3	−5.9
Turnout		511 (est)	85.4 (est)	c. +3.7
Registered electors		598		
Conservative hold		Swing	−5.7	
Conservative hold		Swing	−4.5	

On petition the result was overturned on 4 April 1842 and the opponents, Bernal and Christie, were seated in their place.

General election 1847: Weymouth and Melcombe Regis
Party	Candidate	Votes	%	±%
Whig	William Dougal Christie	274	25.1	+0.5
Whig	William Freestun	274	25.1	+0.2
Conservative	George Butt	272	24.9	−0.3
Conservative	Frederick Child Villiers	271	24.8	−0.6
Majority		2	0.2	N/A
Turnout		546 (est)	87.3 (est)	+1.9
Registered electors		625		
Whig gain from Conservative		Swing	+0.5	
Whig gain from Conservative		Swing	+0.3	

Christie resigned by accepting the office of Steward of the Chiltern Hundreds, causing a by-election.

By-election, 15 December 1847: Weymouth and Melcombe Regis
Party	Candidate	Votes	%	±%
Conservative	Frederick Child Villiers	Unopposed		
Conservative gain from Whig				

=== Elections in the 1850s ===
General election 1852: Weymouth and Melcombe Regis
Party	Candidate	Votes	%	±%
Conservative	George Butt	386	38.4	−11.3
Whig	William Freestun	336	33.4	−16.8
Peelite	Alexander Haldane Oswald	283	28.2	N/A
Turnout		503 (est)	74.0 (est)	−13.3
Registered electors		679		
Majority		50	5.0	N/A
Conservative gain from Whig		Swing	+2.8	
Majority		53	5.2	+5.0
Whig hold		Swing	−2.8	

General election 1857: Weymouth and Melcombe Regis
Party	Candidate	Votes	%	±%
Whig	William Freestun	446	41.8	+8.4
Whig	Robert Campbell	349	32.7	+4.5
Conservative	George Butt	272	25.5	−12.9
Majority		77	7.2	+2.0
Turnout		534 (est)	78.3 (est)	+4.3
Registered electors		681		
Whig hold		Swing	+7.4	
Whig gain from Conservative		Swing	+5.5	

General election 1859: Weymouth and Melcombe Regis
Party	Candidate	Votes	%	±%
Conservative	Robert Brooks	341	26.5	+13.7
Conservative	Arthur Egerton	340	26.4	+13.6
Liberal	William Freestun	311	24.1	−17.7
Liberal	Robert Campbell	297	23.0	−9.7
Majority		29	2.3	N/A
Turnout		645 (est)	86.2 (est)	+7.9
Registered electors		748		
Conservative gain from Liberal		Swing	+13.7	
Conservative gain from Liberal		Swing	+13.7	

=== Elections in the 1860s ===
General election 1865: Weymouth and Melcombe Regis
Party	Candidate	Votes	%	±%
Conservative	Robert Brooks	381	47.6	+21.1
Liberal	Henry Gridley	378	47.2	+23.1
Conservative	Arthur Egerton	28	3.5	−22.9
Liberal	Henry Edwards	14	1.7	−21.3
Turnout		759 (est)	83.8 (est)	−2.4
Registered electors		906		
Majority		3	0.4	−1.9
Conservative hold		Swing	+10.1	
Majority		350	43.7	N/A
Liberal gain from Conservative		Swing	+12.0	

A late compromise between the Conservatives and Liberals, whereby Mr Brooks and Mr Gridley would be elected, came too late to cancel the election.

By-election, 11 June 1867: Weymouth and Melcombe Regis
Party	Candidate	Votes	%	±%
Liberal	Henry Edwards	Unopposed		
Liberal hold				

The 1867 by-election followed the resignation of Henry Gillett Gridley.

General election 1868: Weymouth and Melcombe Regis
Party	Candidate	Votes	%	±%
Conservative	Charles J. T. Hambro	750	39.4	−11.7
Liberal	Henry Edwards	701	36.8	−10.4
Liberal	John Joseph Powell	452	23.8	+22.1
Majority		49	2.6	+2.2
Turnout		952 (est)	70.8 (est)	−13.0
Registered electors		1,343		
Conservative hold		Swing	−11.7	
Liberal hold		Swing	+0.7	

=== Elections in the 1870s ===
General election 1874: Weymouth and Melcombe Regis
Party	Candidate	Votes	%	±%
Liberal	Henry Edwards	944	49.7	−10.9
Conservative	Frederick Johnstone	504	26.5	+6.8
Conservative	Charles J. T. Hambro	452	23.8	+4.1
Majority		440	23.2	+10.2
Turnout		1,422 (est)	96.9 (est)	+26.1
Registered electors		1,467		
Liberal hold		Swing	−10.9	
Conservative hold		Swing	+8.9	

=== Elections in the 1880s ===
General election 1880: Weymouth and Melcombe Regis
Party	Candidate	Votes	%	±%
Liberal	Henry Edwards	1,156	44.2	+19.3
Conservative	Frederick Johnstone	807	30.8	−19.5
Liberal	Alexander Coghill Wylie	653	25.0	+0.1
Turnout		1,308 (est)	81.1 (est)	−15.8
Registered electors		1,612		
Majority		349	13.4	−9.8
Liberal hold		Swing	+14.5	
Majority		154	5.8	−17.4
Conservative hold		Swing	−4.8	

== In Literature ==
In the Aubrey-Maturin novels by Patrick O'Brian the constituency of Melcombe in Dorset is the Parliamentary seat for Jack Aubreys father who holds it for the Whigs. On his father's death Jack Aubrey is offered and takes up the seat for the Tories.
