= Karl Friedrich von Klöden =

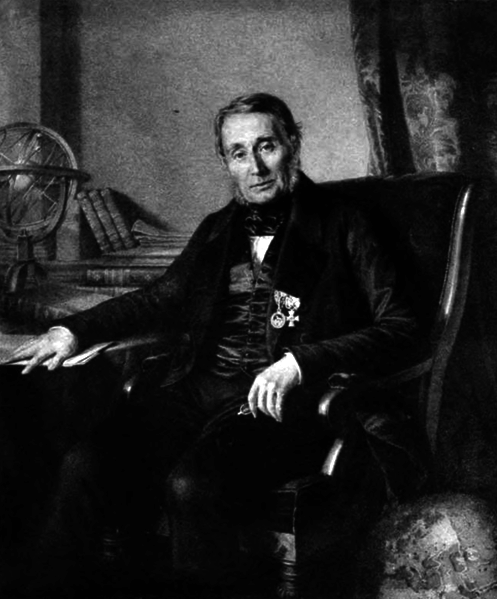
Karl Friedrich von Klöden

Karl Friedrich von Klöden (21 May 1786, in Berlin – 9 January 1856, in Berlin) was a German educator, historian, and geographer.

== Biography ==
The son of an officer from an old line of Markish nobility, he grew up in impoverished circumstances. In 1801, he went to work for his uncle, a goldsmith. He filled the gaps in his general education while learning engraving. In 1807, he began engraving on his own, and making maps as well, earning a reputation as a geographer. From 1814 to 1817, he gave lessons at Plamann's institute while attending the University of Berlin. In 1817, he was made director of the normal school at Potsdam, and seven years afterwards of a commercial school in Berlin.

== Works ==
His most important work was geographical; besides his maps of Europe, mention should be made of Grundlinien zu einer neuen Theorie der Erdgestaltung (1824) and Landeskunde von Palästina (1816). His historical works include: Ueber die Entstehung, das Alter und die früheste Geschichte der Städte Berlin und Kölln (On the origins, age and earliest history of the cities of Berlin and Cologne, 1839); Lebens und Regierungsgeschichte Friedrich Wilhelms des Dritten Königs von Preussen (Life and reign of Frederick William III of Prussia, 1840); and Die Quitzows und ihre Zeit (The Quitzows and their times, 3d ed. 1889).
