= John Northovere =

English politician

John Northovere (fl. 1384–1404) was an English politician. He sat as MP for Melcombe Regis in April 1384, November 1384, 1385, 1386, January 1390 and 1391.

He also served as bailiff of Melcombe Regis by royal appointment from 8 October 1384 until 29 March 1389.
