= Richard Hurst (MP) =

English politician

Richard Hurst (fl. 1406) was an English politician.

He was a member (MP) of the parliament of England for Melcombe Regis in 1406.
