= Robert Veel =

English politician

Robert Veel (died c. 1432), of Shepton Beauchamp, Somerset and Mappowder and Frome Whitfield, Dorset, was an English politician.

He was a Member (MP) of the Parliament of England for Melcombe Regis in 1393 and 1394 and for Dorchester in January 1397.
