= William Dougal Christie =

British diplomat, politician, and man of letters (1816–1874)

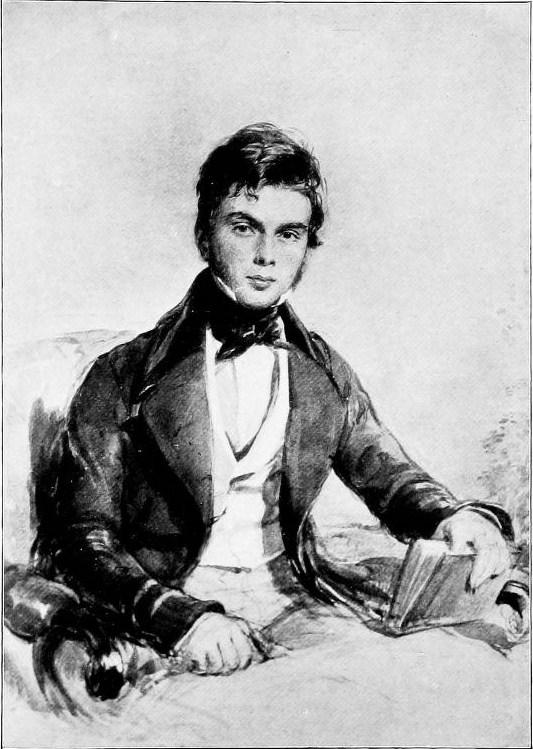
- Christie by George Richmond, c. 1840

United Kingdom Ambassador to Brazil
- In office 1859–1863
- Preceded by: Peter Campbell Scarlett
- Succeeded by: Sir Edward Thornton II

Personal details
- Born: 5 January 1816 Bombay, Bombay Presidency (now Mumbai, Maharashtra, India)
- Died: 27 July 1874 (aged 58) Marylebone, London, England
- Spouse: Mary Grant (m. 1841)
- Education: Trinity College, Cambridge

William Dougal Christie (5 January 1816 – 27 July 1874) was a British diplomat, politician and man of letters.

== Life ==
The son of Dougal Christie, M.D., an officer in the East India Company's medical service, and his wife Mary Crozier, he was born at Bombay on 5 January 1816. He graduated at Trinity College, Cambridge, in 1838, where he was one of the Cambridge Apostles, and was called to the bar in 1840. At this time he was editor of a newspaper, the Kentish Mercury, Gravesend Journal, and Greenwich Gazette, and employed the Chartist Thomas Cooper to edit it. He was also introduced to Thomas Carlyle, perhaps by Albany Fonblanque, and assisted him in the plan for the London Library.

In 1841, Christie was for a short time private secretary to Lord Minto at the admiralty, and from April 1842 to November 1847 represented Weymouth as Member of Parliament. In 1843 he proposed a Bill for removing the religious tests in the old universities; it was quickly defeated. The London Library and the Circulation of French Fiction in the 1840s In 1844 he proposed a motion in order to allow the presence of "strangers" (journalists) in the House of Commons and the recognition of the right of the journalists to publish reports on the Parliamentary debates. This motion was defeated.

In May 1848 Christie was appointed consul-general to the Kingdom of Mosquitia, and from 1851 to 1854 was secretary of legation, frequently acting as chargé d'affaires, to the Swiss Confederation.

In 1854, Christie was made consul-general to the Argentine Republic, and in 1856 minister plenipotentiary. In 1858, he was despatched on a special mission to Paraguay, and in 1859 became envoy extraordinary and minister plenipotentiary to Empire of Brazil. This post involved him in constant difficulties with the Brazilian government, partly arising from his efforts to enforce the treaties relating to the slave trade, and partly from claims for compensation on the part of British subjects. Christie's position wasn't helped by a quarrel at cards with James Watson Webb, the American ambassador, at the Russian embassy.

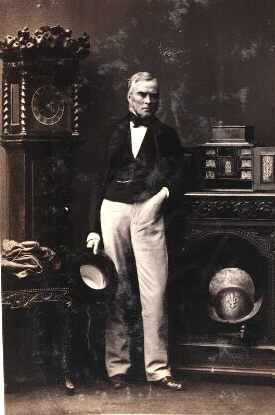
William Dougal Christie, 1861 photograph

The situation came to a head in 1863 when Christie sent an ultimatum for reparations for two minor incidents at the end of 1861 and the beginning of 1862. The Brazilian government refused to yield, and Christie issued orders for British warships to capture Brazilian merchant vessels as indemnity. While Christie had been instructed to accept a Brazilian offer of arbitration if it was made, he was later accused of not informing the Brazilian government of this until after military action had been taken; he had indicated he wanted to teach Brazil a "lesson". Brazil prepared itself for the imminent conflict. The Brazilian government severed diplomatic ties with Britain in June and Christie retired from the service on a pension. The House of Commons debated his conduct, with some MPs like Seymour Vesey-FitzGerald criticising him for taking disproportionate action.

Christie returned to an old topic, campaigning against electoral corruption. He read a paper on the subject to the National Association for the Promotion of Social Science in February 1864. Later in the year F. D. Maurice praised it in Macmillan's Magazine. He then made two unsuccessful attempts to re-enter parliament, at Cambridge in 1865 and Greenock in 1868.

== Death ==
After a serious illness, William Christie died at home in Dorset Square, Marylebone on 27 July 1874.

== Works ==
In 1839 he produced a work advocating the secret ballot, republished with additions in 1872 as The Ballot, and Corruption and Expenditure at Elections. In the Introductory Note on the ballot, he sketched the earlier parliamentary history from his own perspective: George Grote had introduced a motion on it in 1833, and up to 1839 there had been increasing support, with Thomas Babington Macaulay arguing on its side. Henry George Ward took up the cause in 1842, when Grote no longer was an MP. James Mill and Fonblanque were supporters in print; William Empson and John Allen were encouraging about the initial essay of 1839. Only Sydney Smith's witty barbs are mentioned on the other side of the argument.

Christie revisited his diplomatic career in Notes on Brazilian Questions (1865). In retirement, he concentrated on the history and literature of the seventeenth century. He had in 1859 edited a volume of original documents illustrating the life of Anthony Ashley Cooper, 1st Earl of Shaftesbury up to 1660, and in 1871 he published a complete if partisan biography, largely based on the posthumous papers of Shaftesbury and John Locke, and other manuscripts. He wrote a memoir of John Dryden, prefixed to his edition published in the Globe series (1870). In 1874 Christie edited the correspondence of Sir Joseph Williamson, Charles II's secretary of state, for the Camden Society.

Christie became involved in a personal controversy with Abraham Hayward, who had attacked the memory of John Stuart Mill; it included a now-mysterious incident in the whist room of the Athenaeum Club in May 1873. Christie wrote to vindicate Mill, who had contacted him in 1867 over the secret ballot; the debate was cut short by his death.

== Family ==
Christie married Mary Grant, a neighbour and friend of Anthony Trollope, and the eldest daughter of Colonel (later Major-General) James Grant, CB. They had three sons and three daughters. His widow died on 25 April 1908 at Kingston House, Kew, London, aged 89.

By 1875, the house at 32 Dorset Square was occupied by the Rev. Marmaduke Edmonstone Browne. In a court case of 1876 George Robert Francis Christie gave his address as Kingston House.

Of the sons:

- William Henry Christie (born 1842 at Hayes, eldest son, graduated B.A. at Trinity College, Cambridge in 1865, of the Diplomatic Service and the Treasury, died at Kingston House in 1888 aged 45.
- Charles Howard Peregrine Christie (died 1906 aged 60), of the Royal Engineers, worked on railways in India.
- George Robert Francis Christie, youngest son born 1853/4 and educated at Rugby School, died at Durban in 1888 aged 33. In 1881 he became a postmaster at Duff's Road, now in KwaZulu-Natal; he witnessed an appointment by Cetshwayo at Ulundi in 1883. In 1884 he married at Durban Constance Cooley, daughter of Alfred Cooley. His only son, Eric Ernest Christie (1885–1938), a cricketer, was educated in England at Temple Grove School from Kingston House, married in 1909 in Bombay Georgina Augusta Hubbard.

The daughters were:

- Alice Mary Christie (1844–1927), died at age 82. Miss Alice Christie was resident at Kingston House, Kew in 1896 as mentioned in the Journal of Education. She was a noted translator, with works: The Self-Made Man (1876), autobiography of Karl Friedrich von Klöden; Child and Child-Nature (1879) by Bertha von Marenholtz-Bülow; The First Three Years of Childhood (1885) by Bernard Pérez (1836–1903), introduction by James Sully. Hand Work & Head Work: Their Relation to One Another, and the Reform of Education, According to the Principles of Froebel (1883) was another translation from a work by von Marenholtz-Bülow.

Robert Hebert Quick commented in 1890 that the literature on Friedrich Fröbel, proponent of the kindergarten had become "immense". Prochner comments:

Alice M. Christie, who translated a number of works on kindergarten, put it succinctly: children "have always shown a perverse preference for play rather than lessons".

Pérez was a pioneer figure in what was then known as infant psychology; the Sonnenschein's Cyclopaedia of Education (1889) edited by Alfred Fletcher called Christie's translation "The most valuable general book on Infant Psychology; well translated."

Alice Christie went on to translate Johannes Janssen's major work, in 16 volumes, as History of the German People at the close of the Middle Ages (1896 to 1910), the first two volumes being collaboration with M. A. Mitchell.

- The novelist Mary Elizabeth Christie (1847–1906), second daughter. In 1883 she wrote in the Journal of Education of the support she had received for providing art reproductions for elementary schools. It resulted in the foundation of the Art for Schools Association that year, with John Ruskin as the first president, and Christie as secretary. At the end of her life she was working with Frederic Harrison, a family friend, on an edition of Thomas Carlyle's letters to her father. In 1907 was published A Tardiness in Nature and Other Papers, was a posthumous 1907 essay collection by Mary Christie, edited by Maud Withers. In an anonymous review of it in the Times Literary Supplement, Virginia Stephen wrote of Christie's "great vigour and a kind of wholesome shrewdness."
- Catherine Anna Frances Christie (1856–1930) was involved in the University Extension movement, in the London Society for the Extension of University Teaching, taken over by the University of London in 1902. She was the treasurer of the Kew and Richmond Centre in 1885. Her sister Alice, also on the Centre's committee, wrote in 1892 on financial support for the movement, in the University Extension Journal.
