= Palmer baronets of Carlton (1660) =

Baronetcy in the Baronetage of England

Palmer baronets
- Escutcheon of the Palmer baronets of Carlton
- Creation date: 1660
- Status: extant
- Seat: Carlton Curlieu Hall
- Former seat: East Carlton
- Motto: Par sit fortuna labori, May the success be equal to the labour

The Palmer Baronetcy, of Carlton in the County of Northampton, was created in the Baronetage of England on 7 June 1660 for the lawyer and politician Geoffrey Palmer. The second Baronet was Member of Parliament for Higham Ferrers. The third, fourth and fifth Baronets all represented Leicestershire in the House of Commons. The fifth Baronet served as High Sheriff of Leicestershire in 1782 and the eighth Baronet as High Sheriff of Northamptonshire in 1871.

The family seat for 500 years was East Carlton Hall, Northamptonshire until 1933 since when it has been Carlton Curlieu Hall, Leicestershire. The title vests in its twelfth holder.

== Palmer baronets, of Carlton (1660) ==
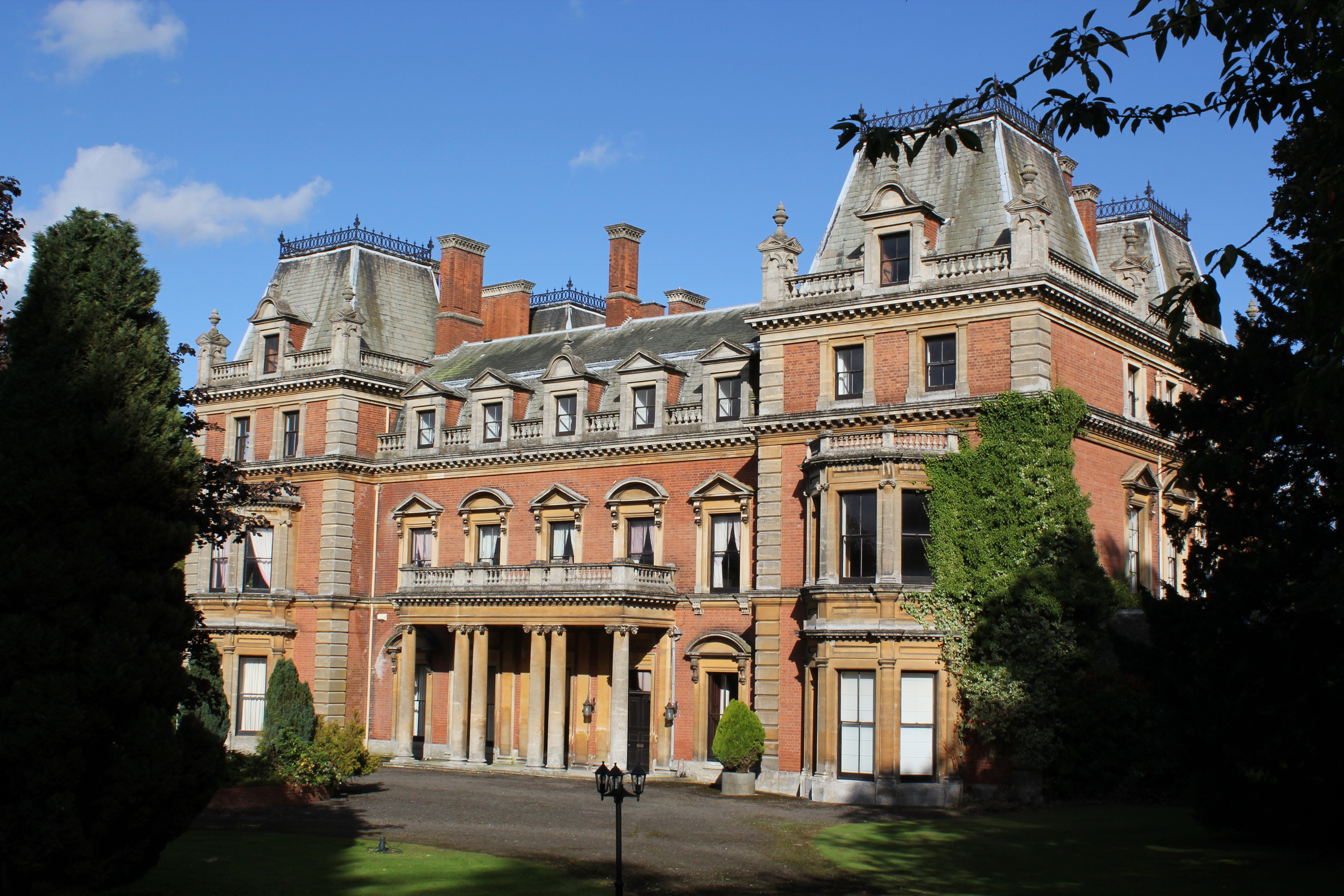
East Carlton - earlier seat of the Palmers of Carlton family

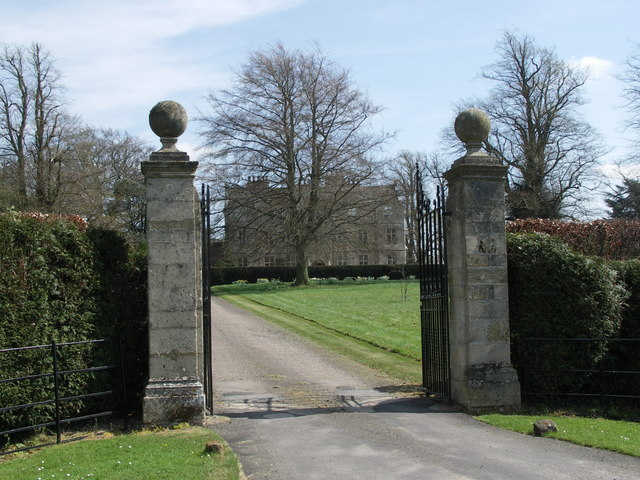
Carlton Curlieu Hall- seat of Palmers of Carlton

- Sir Geoffrey Palmer, 1st Baronet (1598–1670)
- Sir Lewis Palmer, 2nd Baronet (c. 1630–1713)
- Sir Geoffrey Palmer, 3rd Baronet (1655–1732)
- Sir Thomas Palmer, 4th Baronet (died 1765)
- Sir John Palmer, 5th Baronet (c. 1735–1817)
- Sir Thomas Palmer, 6th Baronet (c. 1795–1817)
- Sir John Henry Palmer, 7th Baronet (1775–1865)
- Sir Geoffrey Palmer, 8th Baronet (1809–1892)
- Sir Lewis Henry Palmer, 9th Baronet (1818–1909)
- Sir Edward Geoffrey Broadley Palmer, 10th Baronet (1864–1925)
- Sir Geoffrey Frederick Neill Palmer, 11th Baronet (1893–1951)
- Sir Geoffrey Christopher John Palmer, 12th Baronet (born 1936)

The heir presumptive is the brother of the above, Jeremy Charles Palmer (born 1939). He has two sons, the elder of whom is Drew Herrick (born 1974), who has two daughters, Ella Rose Palmer (born 2006), and Jessica Alice Palmer (born 2008), and who has a son Henry Thomas Heyrick Palmer (born 2012).

== See also ==
- Palmer baronets
