= Thomas Noel =

Thomas Noel may refer to:

- Thomas Noel (historian) (born 1945), American historian
- Thomas Noel (poet) (1799–1861), English poet
- Thomas Noel (MP) (died 1788), British MP for Rutland
- Thomas Noel, 2nd Viscount Wentworth (1745–1815), British politician

== See also ==
- Thomas Noell (died 1702), mayor of New York City
- Thomas E. Noell (1839–1867), U.S. Representative from Missouri
