= Sir Geoffrey Palmer, 3rd Baronet =

British landowner and Tory politician

Sir Geoffrey Palmer, 3rd Baronet (1655–1732) of East Carlton Hall, Northamptonshire was a British landowner and Tory politician who sat in the House of Commons from 1708 to 1722

Palmer was born on 12 June 1655, the eldest son of Sir Lewis Palmer, 2nd Baronet of Carlton Park, Northamptonshire and his wife Jane, Palmer, daughter of Robert Palmer of Carlton Scroop, Lincolnshire. He was admitted at Trinity College, Cambridge in 1672. He married Elizabeth Grantham, daughter of Thomas Grantham of Goltho, Lincolnshire. and Rievaulx Abbey, Yorkshire on 2 February 1681.

Palmer was appointed a Gentleman of the Privy Chamber in about 1704, a post he held until 1714. In 1707, he stood unsuccessfully at a by-election for Leicestershire but a year later at the 1708 general election he topped the poll for the constituency. He was an inactive Member, but voted against the impeachment of Dr Sacheverell in 1710. He was re-elected MP for Leicestershire in 1710 and was listed as a ‘Tory patriot’ who voted for the peace in April 1711, and as a ‘worthy patriot’ who took part in exposing the mismanagements of the previous ministry. He did not stand at the 1713 general election, probably for financial reasons. In April 1713, his financial constraints were lifted when he succeeded to the estates of his father and the baronetcy. He was returned again as MP for Leicestershire at a by-election on 5 August 1714.

At the 1715 general election there was initially no return in February and the election was held again in April. The contests proved expensive and Palmer decided not to stand at the 1722 general election.

Palmer died without issue on 29 December 1732 and was succeeded by his nephew Thomas Palmer.

Parliament of Great Britain
Preceded by George Ashby; John Wilkins	Member of Parliament for Leicestershire; 1708–1713; With: Sir Gilbert Pickering 1708–1710; The Marquess of Granby 1710–1711; Sir Thomas Cave 1711–1713	Succeeded by Viscount Tamworth; Sir Thomas Cave
Preceded by Viscount Tamworth; Sir Thomas Cave	Member of Parliament for Leicestershire; 1714–1722; With: Sir Thomas Cave 1714–1719; Lord William Manners 1719–1722	Succeeded by Edmund Morris; Lord William Manners
Baronetage of England
Preceded by Lewis Palmer	Baronet (of Carlton); 1713–1732	Succeeded by Thomas Palmer
