= Sir Thomas Palmer, 4th Baronet, of Carlton =

British politician

Sir Thomas Palmer, 4th Baronet, of Carlton (1702 – 14 June 1765) was a British politician.

He was the only surviving son of Robert Palmer of Medbourne, Leicestershire and educated at Emmanuel College, Cambridge. He succeeded his father in 1724, and his uncle, Sir Geoffery Palmer as the 4th Baronet in 1732. His family seat was East Carlton Hall in Northamptonshire.

He was a Member of Parliament (MP) for Leicestershire from 1754 to 1765, having been returned unopposed in 1761. He was appointed High Sheriff of Northamptonshire for 1740–41.

He married Jemima (d.1763), the second daughter of Sir John Harpur, 4th Baronet, in 1735; they had three sons and two daughters.

Parliament of Great Britain
Preceded by Wrightson Mundy; Edward Smith	Member of Parliament for Leicestershire; 1754–1765; With: Edward Smith to 1762; Sir Thomas Cave, Bt from 1762	Succeeded by Sir John Palmer, Bt; Sir Thomas Cave, Bt
Baronetage of England
Preceded by Geoffrey Palmer	Baronet of Carlton; 1732–1765	Succeeded by John Palmer
