= Thomas Noel (poet) =

Thomas Noel (11 May 1799 – 22 May 1861) was an English poet.

The son of a clergyman, Noel graduated from Oxford in 1824. He married Emily Anne Halliday in 1831. He was a friend of the House of Commons librarian Thomas Vardon and Anne Isabella Byron, Baroness Byron.

== Life ==
The eldest son of the Rev. Thomas Noel, he was born at Kirkby Mallory, Leicestershire. His father had been presented to the livings of Kirkby-Mallory and Elmesthorpe by his kinsman Thomas Noel, 2nd Viscount Wentworth. Thomas Noel the son graduated B.A. from Merton College, Oxford, in 1824.

Noel lived for many years in seclusion at Boyne Hill, near Maidenhead; but in the autumn of 1858 he went to live at Brighton, where he died on 16 May 1861. Miss Mitford corresponded with him frequently, but they never met. Among other friends were Thomas Vardon, and Lady Byron.

== Works ==
- The Cottage Muse, 1833
- Village Verse, 1841
- Rymes and Roundelayes, 1841

The "Pauper's Drive" from Rymes and Roundelayes was set to music by Henry Russell in 1839. Noel also wrote the words of the song Rocked in the Cradle of the Deep.

== Family ==
By his wife Emily, youngest daughter of Captain Halliday of Ham Lodge, Twickenham, Noel left two children.
