= Lord William Manners =

English nobleman and Whig politician

The Right Honourable Lord William Manners

Member of Parliament for Leicestershire
- In office 1719–1734
- Preceded by: Sir Thomas Cave, Bt; Sir Geoffrey Palmer, Bt
- Succeeded by: Ambrose Philips; Edward Smith

Member of Parliament for Newark
- In office 1738–1754
- Preceded by: Richard Sutton; James Pelham
- Succeeded by: Job Staunton Charlton

Personal details
- Born: 13 November 1697
- Died: 23 April 1772 (aged 74)
- Children: 10, including John and Russell
- Parent(s): John Manners, 2nd Duke of Rutland; Catherine Russell

Lord William Manners (13 November 1697 – 23 April 1772), of Croxton Park, Leicestershire was an English nobleman and Whig politician who sat in the House of Commons between 1719 and 1754. He was the second son of John Manners, 2nd Duke of Rutland and his first wife, Catherine Russell. His brothers John, Robert and Sherard were also Members of Parliament.

== Career ==
=== Parliament ===
Manners was elected Member of Parliament for Leicestershire at a contested by-election on 7 December 1719. He was returned again unopposed for Leicestershire in the 1722 general election. In about 1722, he was appointed Gentleman of the Bedchamber to Prince of Wales. He became Lord of the Bedchamber to the King on the succession of George II in 1727 and was returned unopposed at the 1727 general election. He voted with the Administration on every recorded occasion. He did not stand in 1734 to the disappointment of his friends. He resigned his office at Court in 1738 and was returned to Parliament as MP for Newark by his brother John, now 3rd Duke of Rutland, at a by-election on 31 January 1738. He followed his brother into opposition, voting against the Spanish convention in 1739 and the place bill in 1740, but supporting the government on the motion for the dismissal of Walpole in February 1741. He was returned again for Newark at the 1741 general election. His brother-in-law, Henry Pelham, offered him a post on the Treasury board in 1743, but he refused it. At the 1747 general election he was returned again for Newark. He was listed as an opposition supporter and took sides with Frederick, Prince of Wales. He stood down at the 1754 general election, in favour of his son John.

=== Gambling ===
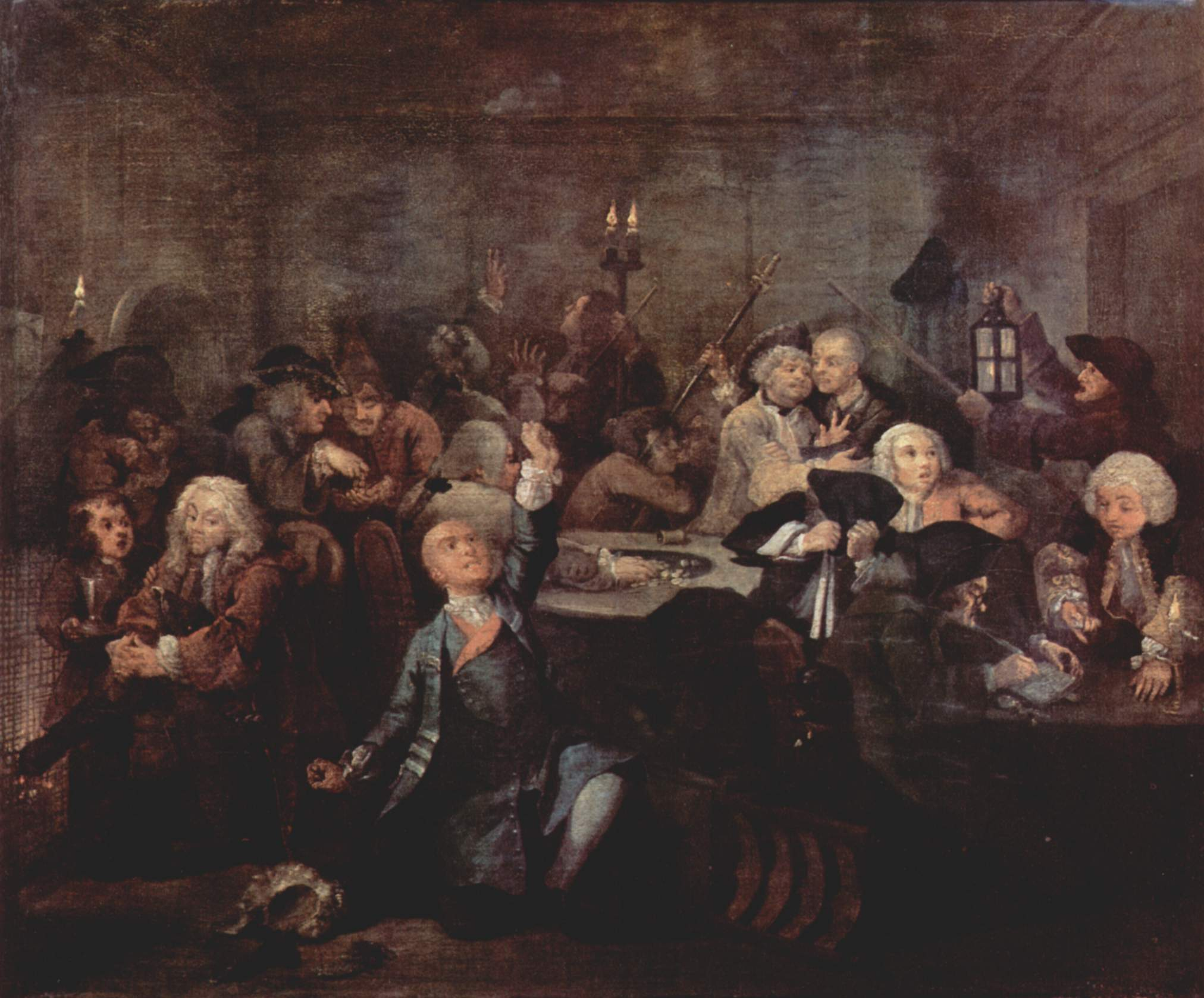
Hogarth – The Gaming House

Manners was known as a successful gambler and made a considerable private fortune by gaming. He is said to have won 1,200 guineas in an evening at New Year 1728. He is supposed to be portrayed in the gambling scene of Hogarth's ‘The Rake's Progress’. He also kept large racing studs and looked after the Belvoir foxhounds. He died on 23 April 1772 as the result of a riding accident.

== Family and Children ==
Manners never married, but by his mistress Corbetta Smyth, daughter of William Smyth, Apothecary of Shrewsbury, he had ten children:

- Corbetta Manners (1728–before 1753), eloped to marry Capt. George Lawson Hall; their daughter Corbetta Hall was a chief beneficiary of her grandmother's will.
- John Manners (1730 – 23 September 1792) politician, married Louisa Tollemache, 7th Countess of Dysart and had several children.
- Rev. Thomas Manners (1731 – 1 December 1812), twice married; firstly in 1758 to Susannah Buckland, who suffered from a mental condition, and secondly immediately after her death. His son William Manners married Frances Whichcote of Aswarby, and has descendants.
- William Manners (1734–1827), married Caroline Pickering
- Russell Manners (1736–1800), married Mary Rayner
- Augusta Manners (21 November 1737 – 1828)
- Frances Manners (1739–1817)
- Robert Manners (b. 1740), died young
- Caroline Manners (1741–1800), married Jeremiah Ellis
- Robert Manners (2 May 1743 – 18 April 1810), married Elizabeth White (1749–1817) with numerous descendants including Rear Admiral Sir Errol Manners (1883-1953).

His descendant David Drew-Smythe speculates that Lord William Manners and his mistress Corbetta Smyth, who had a long-term relationship, never married because of inheritance clauses. All Corbetta's children were recognized by their father.

Conditions of inheritance being linked to stipulations about specific marriage expectations or restrictions are not uncommon and have been known to "force" couples into living and bringing up their children in 'unmarried' relationships in order to avoid losing an inheritance. This is speculation, of course, but there must have been some specific reason why they chose to be unmarried.

== Notes ==
Parliament of Great Britain
Preceded by Sir Thomas Cave, Bt; Sir Geoffrey Palmer, Bt	Member of Parliament for Leicestershire; 1719–1734; With: Sir Geoffrey Palmer, Bt 1719–1722; Edmund Morris 1722–1727; Sir Clobery Noel, 5th Baronet 1727–1733; Ambrose Philips 1734	Succeeded by Ambrose Philips; Edward Smith
Preceded by Richard Sutton; James Pelham	Member of Parliament for Newark; 1738–1754; With: James Pelham 1738–1741; Job Staunton Charlton 1741–1754	Succeeded by Job Staunton Charlton; John Manners
