= Sir Gilbert Pickering, 3rd Baronet =

British member of Parliament (c. 1669 – 1736)

Sir Gilbert Pickering, 3rd Baronet (c.1669 – 29 February 1736) of Titchmarsh, Northamptonshire and West Langton, Leicestershire was an English landowner and Whig politician who sat in the House of Commons from 1708 to 1710.

Pickering was the eldest and only surviving son of Sir John Pickering, 2nd Baronet and his wife Frances Alston, daughter of Sir Thomas Alston, 1st Baronet, of Odell Bedfordshire. Before 1691, he married his 14-year-old cousin, Elizabeth Staunton, the daughter and heiress of Staveley Staunton of Birchmore, Woburn, Bedfordshire, who brought him a fortune. He succeeded his father to the baronetcy on 3 April 1703.

Pickering served as High Sheriff of Leicestershire for the year 1705 to 1706. He was returned in a close contest as a Whig Member of Parliament for Leicestershire at the 1708 British general election. He was fairly inactive in Parliament. He voted in favour of the naturalization of the Palatines in 1709, was a teller for committing a bill to regulate the construction of new building works in London and Westminster on 10 March 1709, and voted for the impeachment of Dr Sacheverell in 1710. He agreed to retire at the 1710 British general election to let the Duke of Rutland’s son, Lord Granby, stand instead. He was a Gentleman of the Privy Chamber from about 1714 to his death.

Pickering died in Cavendish Square, London in March 1736. He left one surviving son and three daughters. He was succeeded by his son Edward, after whose death the baronetcy became extinct.

Parliament of Great Britain
Preceded by George Ashby; John Wilkins	Member of Parliament for Leicestershire; 1708–1710; With: Sir Geoffrey Palmer, 3rd Baronet	Succeeded by Sir Geoffrey Palmer, 3rd Baronet; Marquess of Granby
Baronetage of Nova Scotia
Preceded by John Pickering	Baronet (of Titchmarsh); 1703–1736	Succeeded by Edward Pickering
