= John Bale (disambiguation) =

John Bale (1495–1563) was an English historian and bishop.

John Bale may also refer to:

- John Bale (baseball) (born 1974), former Major League Baseball left-handed pitcher
- John Lloyd Bale (1837–1885), Australian banker and politician
- Sir John Bale, 1st Baronet (1617–died by 1654) of the Bale baronets
- John Bale (MP) (died 1561/2), MP for Bath

== See also ==
- Bale (disambiguation)
- John de Bale, member of Parliament for Gloucester, 1302
