= Sir Thomas Cave, 5th Baronet =

British politician and lawyer (1712–1778)

Sir Thomas Cave, 5th Baronet (27 May 1712 – 7 August 1778) was a British politician and lawyer.

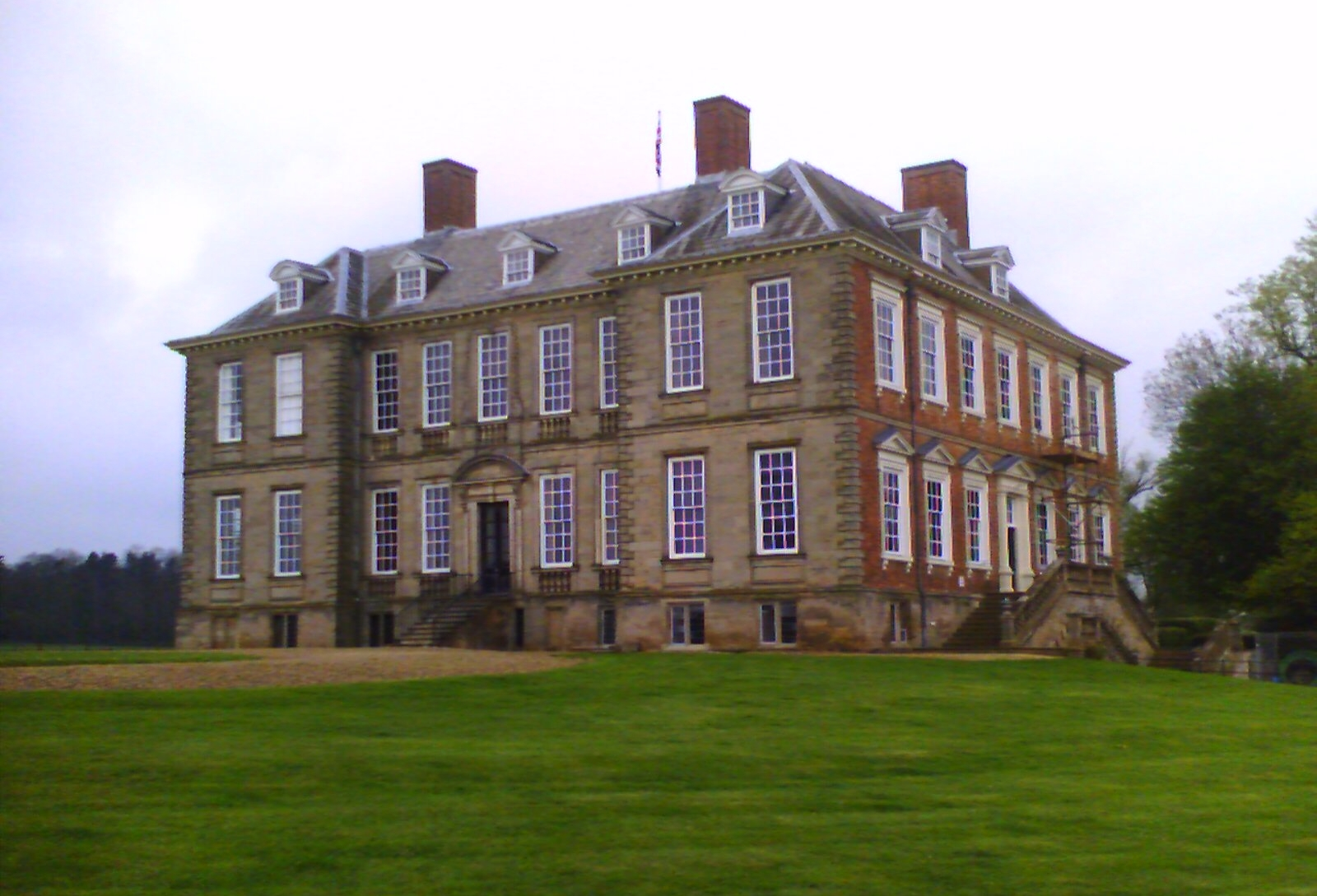
Stanford hall - seat of the Cave baronets

== Background ==
Baptised at St Martin-in-the-Fields Church in Covent Garden, he was the second son of Sir Thomas Cave, 3rd Baronet and his wife Hon. Margaret Verney, daughter of John Verney, 1st Viscount Fermanagh. Cave was educated at Rugby School and then at Balliol College, Oxford. In 1734, he succeeded his older brother Verney as baronet. Cave was called to the bar by the Inner Temple in the following year and he received an honorary degree of Doctor of Civil Law by the University of Oxford in 1756.

== Career ==
Cave entered the British House of Commons in 1741, sitting as a Member of Parliament (MP) for Leicestershire until 1747. He was again successful in 1762 and represented the constituency until his withdrawal from politics in 1774, because of ill health.

== Family ==
He married Elizabeth Davies, daughter of Griffith Davies in November 1735 and had by her six daughters and two sons. Among them were:

- Sir Thomas Cave, 6th Baronet (22 August 1737 – 30 May 1780). He married Sarah Edwards. They had one son who succeeded him, Thomas, 7th Baronet and a daughter Sarah, Baroness Braye.
- Rev. Sir Charles Cave, 8th Baronet (c. 1747–1810). He was never married.
- Margaret Cave, married John Moses. They were parents of Mary Jane Moses (1765-1800), first wife of Aubrey Beauclerk, 6th Duke of Saint Albans.
- Elizabeth Cave, married as his fourth wife, Bennet Sherard, 3rd Earl of Harborough. They had no issue.
- Maria Constantia Cave, married in 1773 Henry Etherington, with no issue.

Cave died, aged 66 and was buried at Stanford, Northamptonshire. He was succeeded in the baronetcy by his oldest son Thomas.

Parliament of Great Britain
Preceded by Lord Guernsey; Edward Smith	Member of Parliament for Leicestershire; 1741 – 1747; With: Edward Smith	Succeeded by Wrightson Mundy; Edward Smith
Preceded by Sir Thomas Palmer; Edward Smith	Member of Parliament for Leicestershire; 1762 – 1774; With: Sir Thomas Palmer 1762–1765; Sir John Palmer 1765–1774	Succeeded by Sir John Palmer; Thomas Noel
Baronetage of England
Preceded by Verney Cave	Baronet (of Stanford); 1734–1778	Succeeded by Thomas Cave
