= Noel baronets =

Extinct baronetcy in the Baronetage of England

There have been three baronetcies created for persons with the surname Noel, two in the Baronetage of England and one in the Baronetage of Great Britain. One creation is extant as of 2008.

The Noel Baronetcy, of Brook in the County of Rutland, was created in the Baronetage of England on 29 June 1611. For more information on this creation, see the Earl of Gainsborough (1682 creation).

The Noel Baronetcy, of Kirkby Mallery in the County of Leicester, was created in the Baronetage of England on 4 July 1660 for Verney Noel. The sixth Baronet succeeded as ninth Baron Wentworth in 1745. For further history of the baronetcy, see this title.

The Middleton, later Noel Baronetcy, of the Navy, was created in the Baronetage of Great Britain on 23 October 1781. For more information on this creation, see the Earl of Gainsborough (1841 creation).

== Noel baronets, of Brook (1611) ==
- Edward Noel, 1st baronet (succeeded as 2nd Viscount Campden in 1629) (died 1643)

== Noel baronets, of Kirkby Mallery (1660) ==
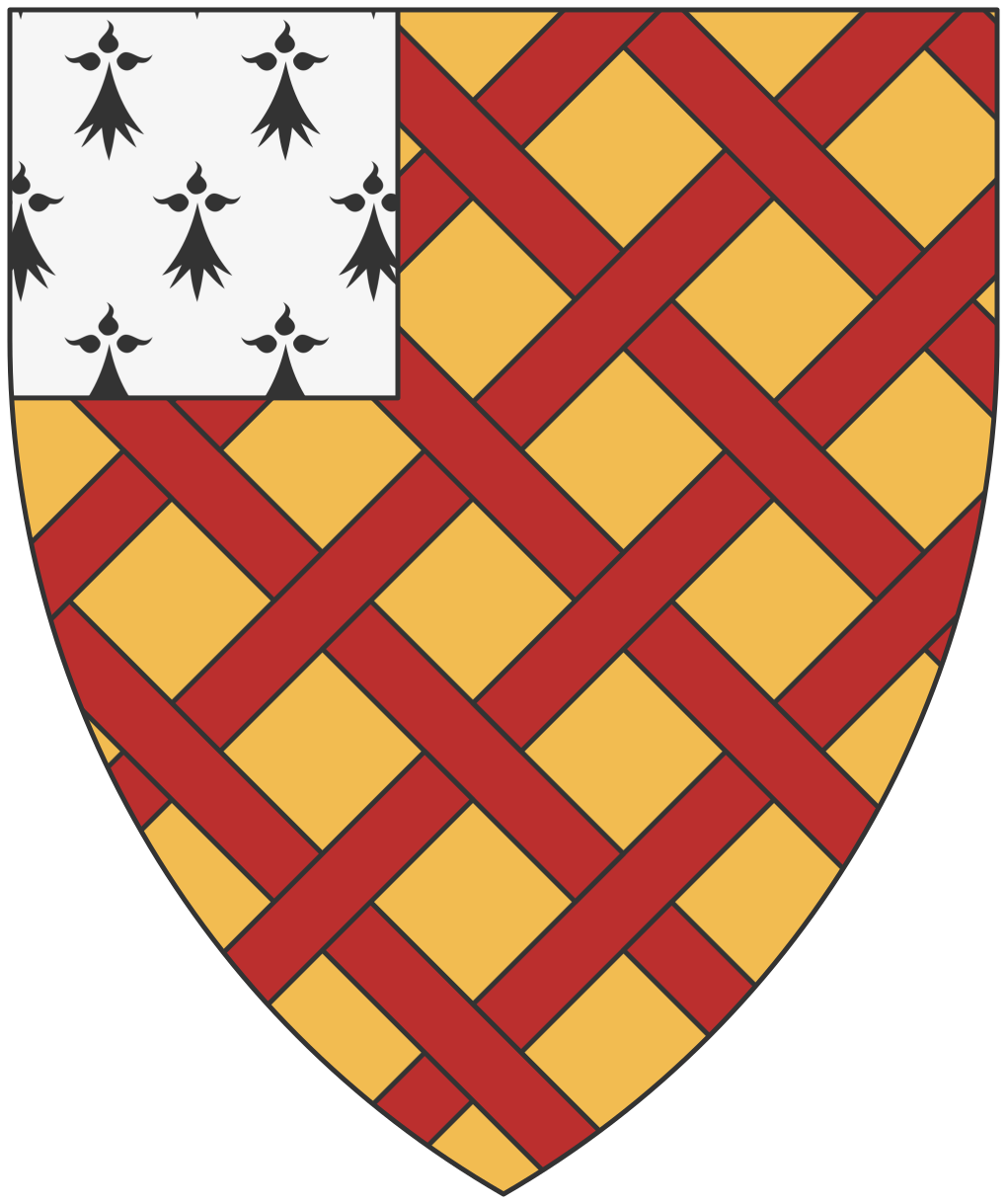
Arms of Noel of Kirkby Mallery

- Sir Verney Noel, 1st Baronet (died 1670)
- Sir William Noel, 2nd Baronet (1642–1675)
- Sir Thomas Noel, 3rd Baronet (c. 1662–1688)
- Sir John Noel, 4th Baronet (c. 1668–1697)
- Sir Clobery Noel, 5th Baronet (c. 1695–1733)
- Sir Edward Noel, 6th Baronet (1715–1774) (succeeded as Baron Wentworth in 1745)

see the Baron Wentworth for further succession

== Middleton, later Noel baronets, of the Navy (1781) ==
- Charles Middleton, 1st Baron Barham, 1st Baronet (1726–1813)
- Sir Gerard Noel, 2nd Baronet (1759–1838)
- Charles Noel, 3rd Baron Barham. 3rd Baronet (1781–1866) (created Earl of Gainsborough in 1841)

== Notes ==
Baronetage of England
Preceded by Leigh baronets	Noel baronets 29 June 1611	Succeeded by Cotton baronets
