= Sir Lewis Palmer, 2nd Baronet =

English politician

Member of Parliament for Higham Ferrers
- In office 1661–1679
- In office 1685–1687

Personal details
- Born: 1630
- Died: 1713 (aged 82–83)
- Spouse: Jane Palmer (m. 1654; death 1701) Frances Mary Chapman (m. 1703)
- Children: 9

Sir Lewis Palmer, 2nd Baronet (1630–1713), of Carlton Park, Northamptonshire was an English politician. He was the son of Sir Geoffrey Palmer, 1st Baronet and succeeded to the baronetcy in 1670. He sat in Parliament for Higham Ferrers in 1661 and 1685 and served as Justice of the Peace for Northamptonshire.

Lewis Palmer was baptised 21 September 1630, the second son of Sir Geoffrey Palmer, 1st Baronet, and the brother of barrister Edward Palmer and Geoffrey Palmer, who became MP for Ludgershall. Palmer entered the Middle Temple in 1647.

Palmer married three times. First, he was married to Jane Palmer of Carlton Scroop from 20 June 1654 to her death on 11 February 1701. The couple had nine children, six of which survived Palmer. Palmer next married Frances, then Mary Chapman of East Carlton on 2 January 1703. His last two marriages produced no children.

Palmer died in early 1713.

Baronetage of England
Preceded by Sir Geoffrey Palmer, 1st Baronet	Baronet (of Carlton); 1670–1713	Extinct
