= John Peach-Hungerford =

British politician

John Peach-Hungerford (c. 1719–1809) was a British politician who sat in the House of Commons from 1775 to 1790.

Peach-Hungerford was the only son of John Hungerford of Coombe Bissett, Wiltshire and his wife St John Topp, daughter of Sir John Topp, 2nd Baronet of Tormarton, Gloucestershire. His father died in 1723 and his mother remarried to Thomas Peach of Dingley Hall, Northamptonshire. He succeeded his step-father in 1770 and took the name of Peach before Hungerford.

Peach-Hungerford stood as an independent for Leicestershire at a by-election on 12 January 1775. He was returned as Member of Parliament after a costly and hard-fought contest against William Pochin, the Rutland candidate. In Parliament he maintained an independent line. He was returned unopposed for Leicestershire at the 1780 general election and again at the 1784 general election because of a compromise made between the two county interests. He does not appear to have spoken in Parliament. He did not stand in 1790.

Peach-Hungerford died on 3 June 1809.

Parliament of Great Britain
Preceded by Sir John Palmer; Thomas Noel	Member of Parliament for Leicestershire; 1775– 1790; With: Sir John Palmer; William Pochin	Succeeded by William Pochin; Sir Thomas Cave
