= Sir Geoffrey Palmer, 1st Baronet =

English lawyer and politician

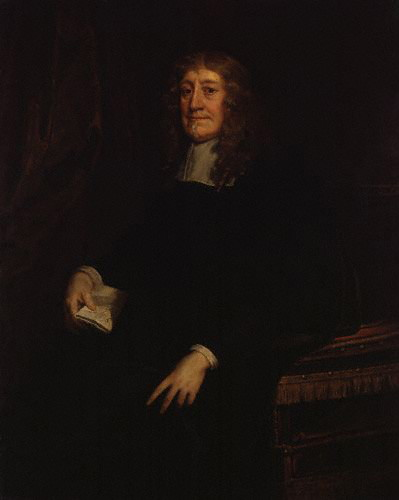
Sir Geoffrey Palmer, 1st Baronet

Sir Geoffrey Palmer, 1st Baronet, SL (1598 – 5 May 1670) was an English lawyer and politician.

== Early life and family ==
Born in East Carlton, Northamptonshire, he obtained a BA from Christ's College, Cambridge, in 1616 and a MA 1619. He was admitted to the Middle Temple on 14 June 1616 and called to the bar on 23 May 1623. He married Margaret Moore, daughter of Francis Moore, a serjeant-at-law of Berkshire, by whom he had six children:

- Thomas Palmer (died young)
- Lewis Palmer (1630–1713)
- Geoffrey Palmer (1642–1661)
- Edward Palmer
- Elizabeth Palmer
- Frances Palmer

== Career ==
Palmer was elected to the Long Parliament in 1640, representing Stamford. He was a manager of Strafford's impeachment, giving advice on points of law and the procedural rights of the accused. He joined in the protestation of 3 May 1641 in defence of the Protestant religion, and the act for prolongation of the Parliament on 11 May 1641. After the latter, he joined Hyde and Falkland in supporting the King in his opposition to his new council. Upon the passage of the Grand Remonstrance, he rose to protest against John Hampden's motion to print it, creating a tremendous tumult. The next day, he referred to the majority as "A Rabble of inconsiderable persons, set on by a juggling Junto," and was committed to the Tower for a few weeks. After the passage of the Militia Ordinance, he withdrew from Parliament to become Commissioner of Array for Lincolnshire.

In 1643, he was awarded a DCL by the University of Oxford, and was a member of the royalist Parliament that met there in 1644. Appointed Solicitor General in 1645, he was captured at the fall of Oxford and compounded his estates for £500 in September 1648. He practised law in London during the 1650s. Palmer was committed to the Tower again on 9 June 1655 on suspicion of raising forces against Cromwell, but was released the following year.

Palmer prospered at the Restoration, being made Attorney General on 31 May 1660, and bencher of the Middle Temple the next month. He was knighted on 1 June 1660, created a baronet on 7 June 1660, and serjeant-at-law in October 1660.

During this period, he was active as counsel to the crown and in prosecutions, particularly that of the regicides in 1662. A strong supporter of the royal prerogative, he joined with Hyde, now Earl of Clarendon, who was assembling a collaboration to enact legislation. Geoffrey obtained a seat at Ludgershall for his elder son, Geoffrey, in March 1661 by forcing the sheriff to deliver the election writ to his agent, but Geoffrey died in October; his son Lewis was elected for Higham Ferrers at the same election. He briefly enjoyed an appointment as Chief Justice of Chester from 1661 to 1662, and was recorder of Boston from 1662 until his death on 5 May 1670, in his house at Hampstead Fields, Middlesex. His funeral was attended by a large number of nobles and judges, and he was interred at East Carlton. His monument is in the south transept of St Peter's Church, East Carlton.

His estates included the manors of East and West Carlton, Northamptonshire, which his family had held from the 15th century and the Carlton Curlieu Hall estate, Leicestershire, which he purchased in 1664.

Legal offices
| Preceded by Sir Thomas Gardiner | Solicitor General; 1645–1648 | Succeeded by Edmund Prideaux |
| Preceded by Robert Reynolds | Attorney General; 1660–1670 | Succeeded by Sir Heneage Finch, Bt |
| Preceded by Timothy Turner | Chief Justice of Chester; 1661–1662 | Succeeded by Sir Job Charlton |
Baronetage of England
| New creation | Baronet (of Carlton); 1660–1670 | Succeeded by Lewis Palmer |
