= Edmund Morris (MP for Leicestershire) =

English landowner and Tory politician

Edmund Morris (c. 1686 – July 1759), of Loddington, Leicestershire, was an English landowner and Tory politician who sat in the House of Commons from 1722 to 1727.

Morris was the eldest son of Charles Morris of Loddington, Leicestershire and his wife Susanna Bacon, daughter of Sir Edmund Bacon, 4th Baronet MP, of Redgrave, Suffolk. He was educated at Rugby School and matriculated at Magdalen College, Oxford on 14 December 1702, aged 16. In 1703 he was admitted at Middle Temple. In 1710, he succeeded his father to Loddington. He married Anne Campbell, the daughter of Sir Alexander Campbell, MP of Calder, Nairn, Scotland on 2 August 1720.

At the 1722 British general election, Morris was returned unopposed as Tory Member of Parliament for Leicestershire. He did not stand in 1727. He was appointed High Sheriff of Leicestershire for the year 1746 to 1747.

Morris was buried at Loddington on 30 July 1759, leaving one son and four daughters.

Parliament of Great Britain
Preceded by Lord William Manners and Sir Geoffrey Palmer, 3rd Baronet	Member of Parliament for Leicestershire; 1722–1727; With: Lord William Manners	Succeeded by Lord William Manners and Sir Clobery Noel, 5th Baronet
