= Sir John Palmer, 5th Baronet =

British politician (1735–1817)

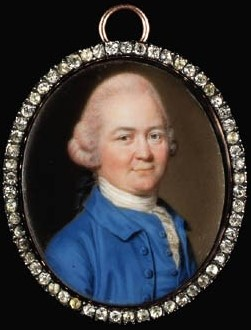
Portrait by John Smart, 1770

Sir John Palmer, 5th Baronet (1735– 11 February 1817) was a British politician who sat in the House of Commons from 1765 to 1780.

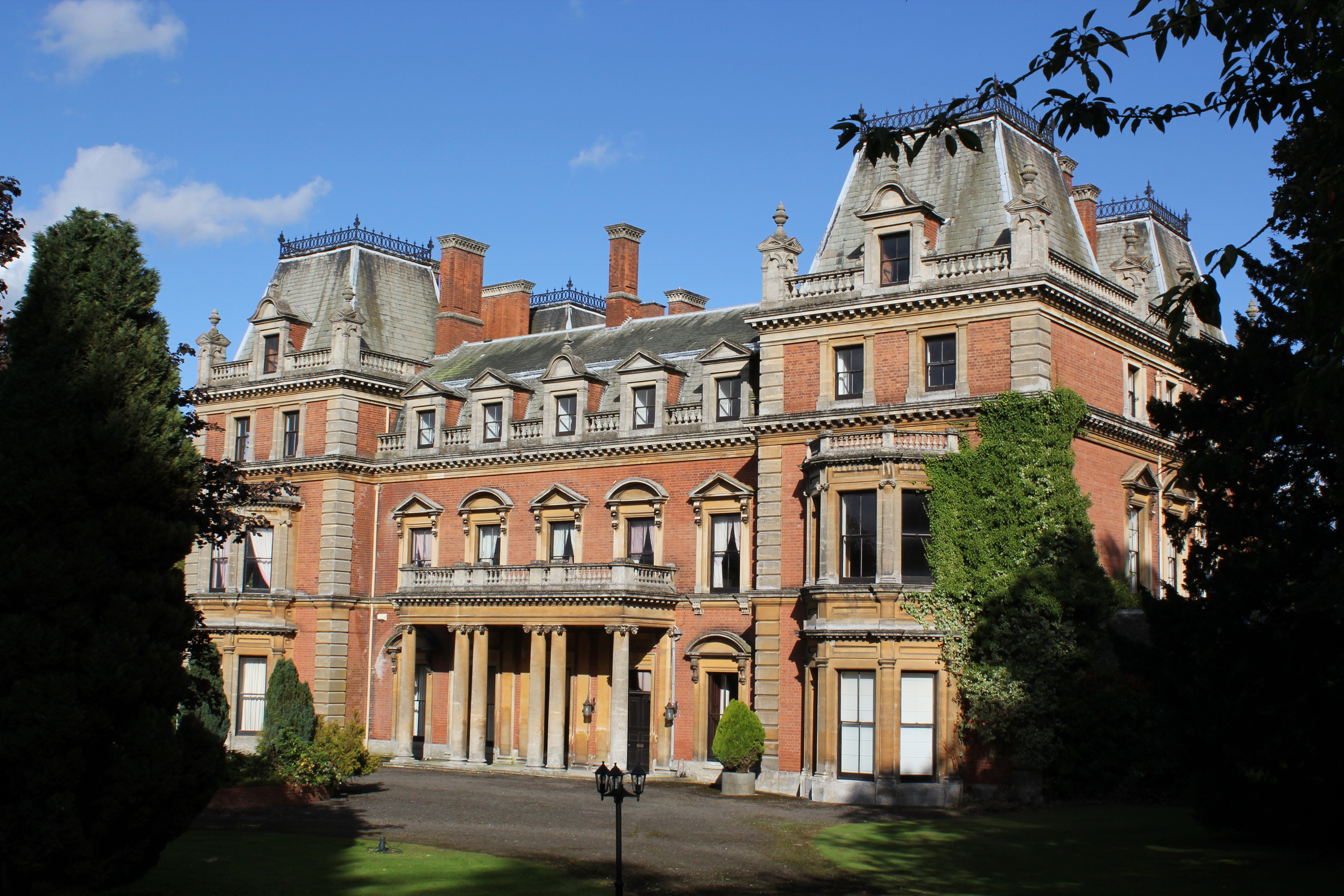
East Carlton Hall

Palmer was the only surviving son of Sir Thomas Palmer, 4th Baronet, of Carlton and was baptised on 20 February 1735. He was educated at Leicester and was admitted at Emmanuel College, Cambridge in 1752. He succeeded his father in the baronetcy on 14 June 1765. In 1776/1778 he commissioned John Johnson, a Leicester architect, to design a new hall at East Carlton, Northamptonshire on the foundations of a previous hall.

Palmer was elected Member of Parliament for Leicestershire in a by-election on 26 December 1765. He was returned again in 1768 and 1774. He did not stand in 1780.

Palmer married Charlotte Gough, daughter of Sir Henry Gough, 1st Baronet, on 23 July 1768 and had 5 sons and 2 daughters. He died on 11 February 1817 and was succeeded in turn by his sons Sir Thomas Palmer, 6th Baronet, and Sir John Henry Palmer, 7th Baronet.

Parliament of Great Britain
Preceded by Sir Thomas Palmer; Sir Thomas Cave	Member of Parliament for Leicestershire; 1765–1780; With: Sir Thomas Cave; Thomas Noel; John Peach-Hungerford	Succeeded by William Pochin; John Peach-Hungerford
Baronetage of England
Preceded by Thomas Palmer	Baronet of Carlton; 1765–1817	Succeeded by Thomas Palmer
