= John Manners, 2nd Duke of Rutland =

British politician (1676–1721)

His Grace The Duke of Rutland KG
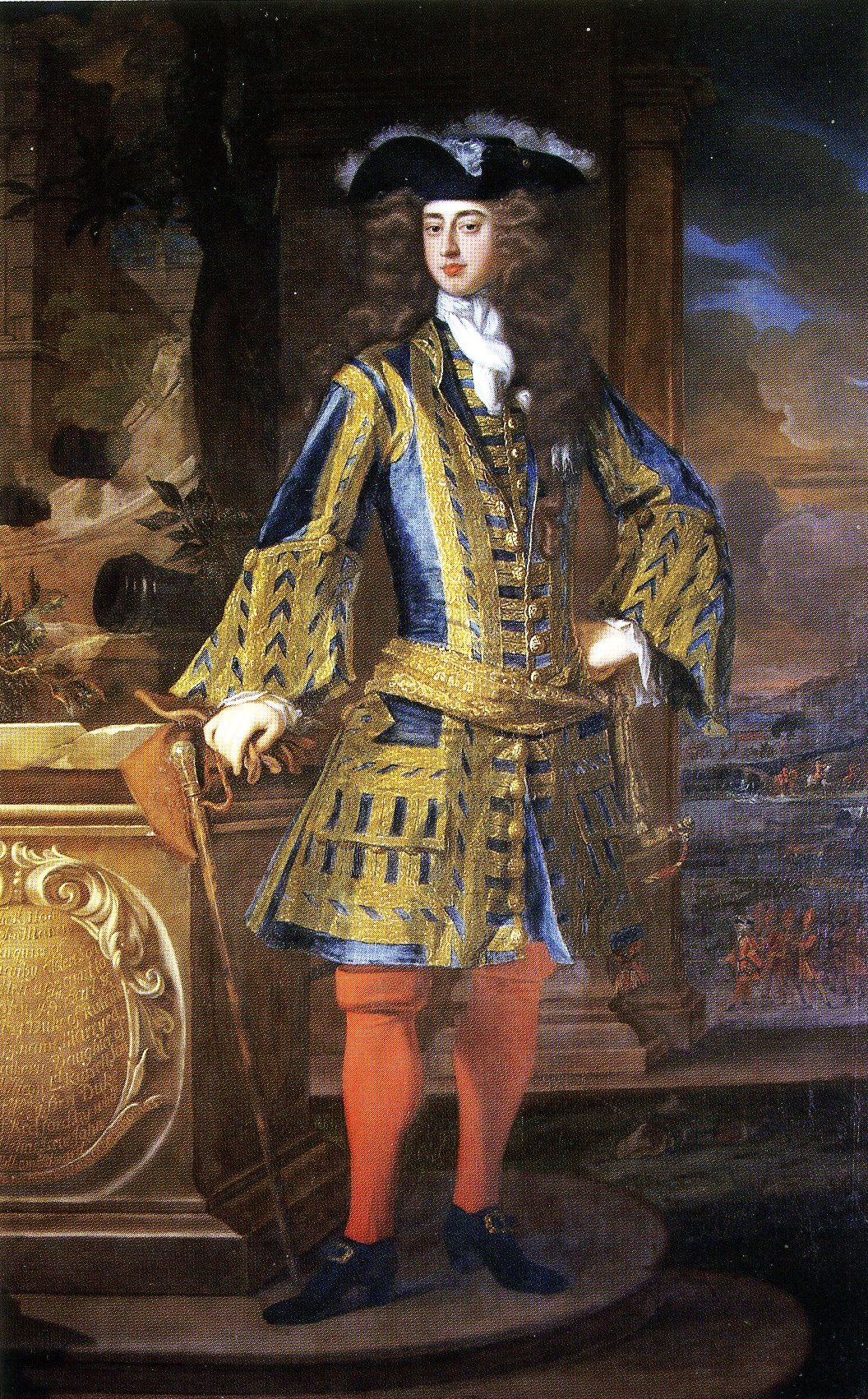
- John Manners, 2nd Duke of Rutland, oil by Jean-Baptiste Closterman c. 1730s, Belvoir Castle

Lord-Lieutenant of Leicestershire
- In office 1714–1721
- Monarch: George I
- Preceded by: The Earl of Denbigh
- Succeeded by: The 3rd Duke of Rutland

Personal details
- Born: 18 September 1676
- Died: 22 February 1721 (aged 44)
- Spouse(s): Catherine Russell; Lucy Sherard
- Children: 17, including John, William, Catherine, Sherard, Robert, and Charles
- Parent(s): John Manners, 1st Duke of Rutland; Catherine Wriothesley Noel

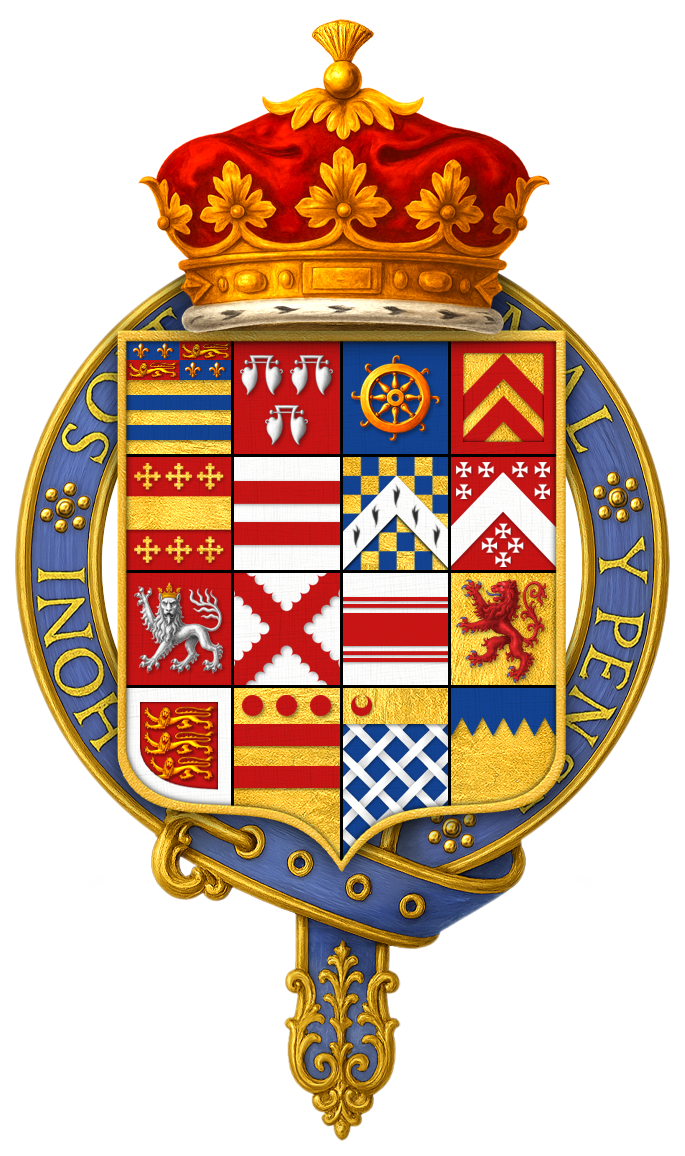
Quartered arms of John Manners, 2nd Duke of Rutland, KG

John Manners, 2nd Duke of Rutland KG (18 September 1676 – 22 February 1721), styled Lord Roos from 1679 to 1703 and Marquess of Granby from 1703 to 1711, was a British Whig politician who sat in the English and British House of Commons from 1701 until 1711, when he succeeded to the peerage as Duke of Rutland.

== Early life ==
Manners was the son of John Manners, 1st Duke of Rutland and his third wife Catherine Wriothesley Noel, daughter of Baptist Noel, 3rd Viscount Campden.

== Career ==
As a young man the then Lord Roos was Colonel of the Leicestershire Militia Horse in 1697 under his father, who was the Lord Lieutenant of Leicestershire.

Manners was returned as a Whig Member of Parliament for Derbyshire at the first general election of 1701. He was returned as MP for Leicestershire at the second general election of 1701. At the 1705 English general election he was returned as MP for Grantham. He was a Commissioner for the Union with Scotland in 1706. He was returned again as MP for Grantham at the 1708 British general election. At the 1710 British general election, he was returned as MP for both Leicestershire and Grantham. He succeeded his father as Duke of Rutland on 10 January 1711 and vacated his seats in the house of Commons, having not decided which he would choose. He was Lord Lieutenant of Rutland from 1712 to 1715 and Lord Lieutenant of Leicestershire from 1714 to 1721. In 1714, he was made a Knight of the Garter.

== Legacy ==
Manners married, firstly, Catherine Russell, daughter of William Russell, Lord Russell and Lady Rachel Wriothesley, on 23 August 1693. They had nine children:

- John Manners, 3rd Duke of Rutland (1696–1779), who married Hon. Bridget Sutton and had children
- Lord William Manners (1697–1772), who married Corbetta Smyth and had children
- Lord Edward Manners
- Lord Thomas Manners (died 1723)
- Lord Wriothesley Manners
- Lady Catherine Manners (died 18 February 1780), who married on 29 October 1726 Henry Pelham and had children.
- Lady Elizabeth Manners (1709 – 22 March 1730), who married John Monckton, 1st Viscount Galway, and had children.
- Lady Rachel Manners (died c. 1723)
- Lady Frances Manners, who married Hon. Richard Arundell, son of John Arundell, 2nd Baron Arundell of Trerice.

Manners succeeded his father as Duke of Rutland on 10 January 1711. A few months later, his wife Catherine died.

He married, secondly, Lucy Sherard, daughter of Bennet Sherard, 2nd Baron Sherard, on 1 January 1713. Their children included:

- Lord Sherard Manners (c. 1713 – 13 January 1742), who became MP for Tavistock
- Lord James Manners (1720 – 1 November 1790)
- Lord George Manners (d. December 1721)
- Lady Caroline Manners (d. 10 November 1769), who married on 2 October 1734 Sir Henry Harpur, 5th Baronet (d. 1748), by whom she had children; she married secondly, on 17 July 1753, Sir Robert Burdett, 4th Baronet (d. 1797).
- Lady Lucy Manners (c. 1717 – 18 June 1788), who married on 28 October 1742, in London, William Graham, 2nd Duke of Montrose and had children.
- Lord Robert Manners (c. 1721 – 31 May 1782), who married on 1 January 1756 Mary Digges and had children
- Lord Henry Manners (d. 1745)
- Lord Charles Manners (d. 1761)

Parliament of England
Preceded by Marquess of Hartington; Thomas Coke	Member of Parliament for Derbyshire; 1701–1701; With: Marquess of Hartington	Succeeded by Thomas Coke; Sir John Curzon, Bt
Preceded by John Verney; John Wilkins	Member of Parliament for Leicestershire; 1701–1702; With: The Lord Sherard	Succeeded by John Verney; John Wilkins
Preceded by Sir William Ellys, Bt; Richard Ellys	Member of Parliament for Grantham; 1705–1707; With: Sir William Ellys, Bt	Succeeded by Parliament of Great Britain
Parliament of Great Britain
Preceded by Parliament of England	Member of Parliament for Grantham; 1707–1710; With: Sir William Ellys, Bt	Succeeded by Sir William Ellys, Bt; Sir John Thorold, Bt
Preceded by Sir Geoffrey Palmer, Bt; Sir Gilbert Pickering, Bt	Member of Parliament for Leicestershire; 1710–1711; With: Sir Geoffrey Palmer, Bt	Succeeded by Sir Geoffrey Palmer, Bt; Sir Thomas Cave, Bt
Honorary titles
Preceded by The Earl of Denbigh	Lord Lieutenant of Leicestershire; 1714–1721	Succeeded by The Duke of Rutland
Peerage of England
Preceded by John Manners	Duke of Rutland; 1711–1721	Succeeded by John Manners
