= Carlton Curlieu Hall =

Country house in Leicestershire, England

Coordinates: 52.5675°N 0.9752°W

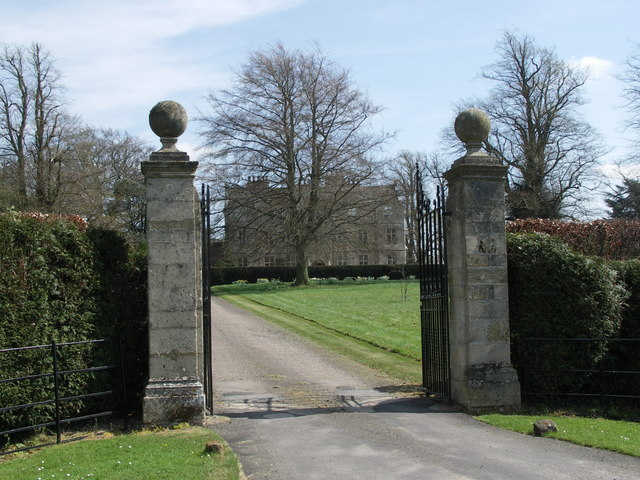
Carlton Curlieu Hall

Carlton Curlieu Hall is a privately owned 17th-century country house at Carlton Curlieu, Leicestershire. It is the home of the Palmer family and is a Grade II* listed building.

John Bale purchased land at Carlton Curlieu in 1549 and in 1575 his nephew and namesake acquired the Manor estate. His son, also John Bale, High Sheriff of Leicestershire in 1624, replaced the old manor house with the present house on the same site in 1636.

The house which incorporates later alterations, presents an entrance front of five bays and three storeys with basements. The central and end bays protrude forward up to second storey height; the central serving as the Doric order columned entrance porch. The upper storey has five Dutch gables.

Following fines imposed on them after the Civil War the house was sold in 1661 by Sir John Bale Bt the first and only Bale baronet, to be bought in 1664 by Sir Geoffrey Palmer Bt of East Carlton Hall, Northamptonshire, Attorney General in 1660.

The house became the principal seat of the Palmer family following the sale of East Carlton in 1933.
