= Robert Shirley, Viscount Tamworth =

English politician

Robert Shirley, Viscount Tamworth (28 December 1692 – 5 July 1714) of Staunton Harold, Leicestershire, was an English nobleman and politician.

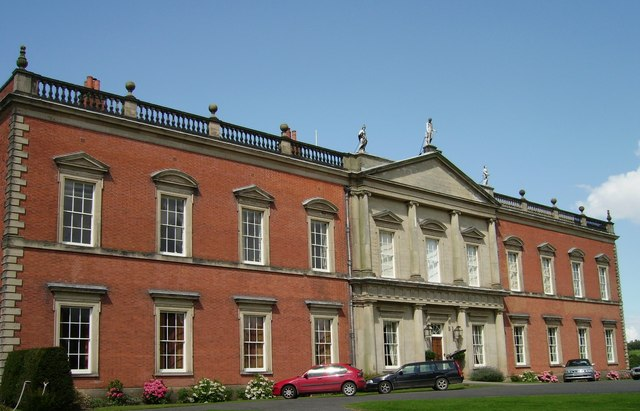
Staunton Harold Hall - Shirley's birthplace

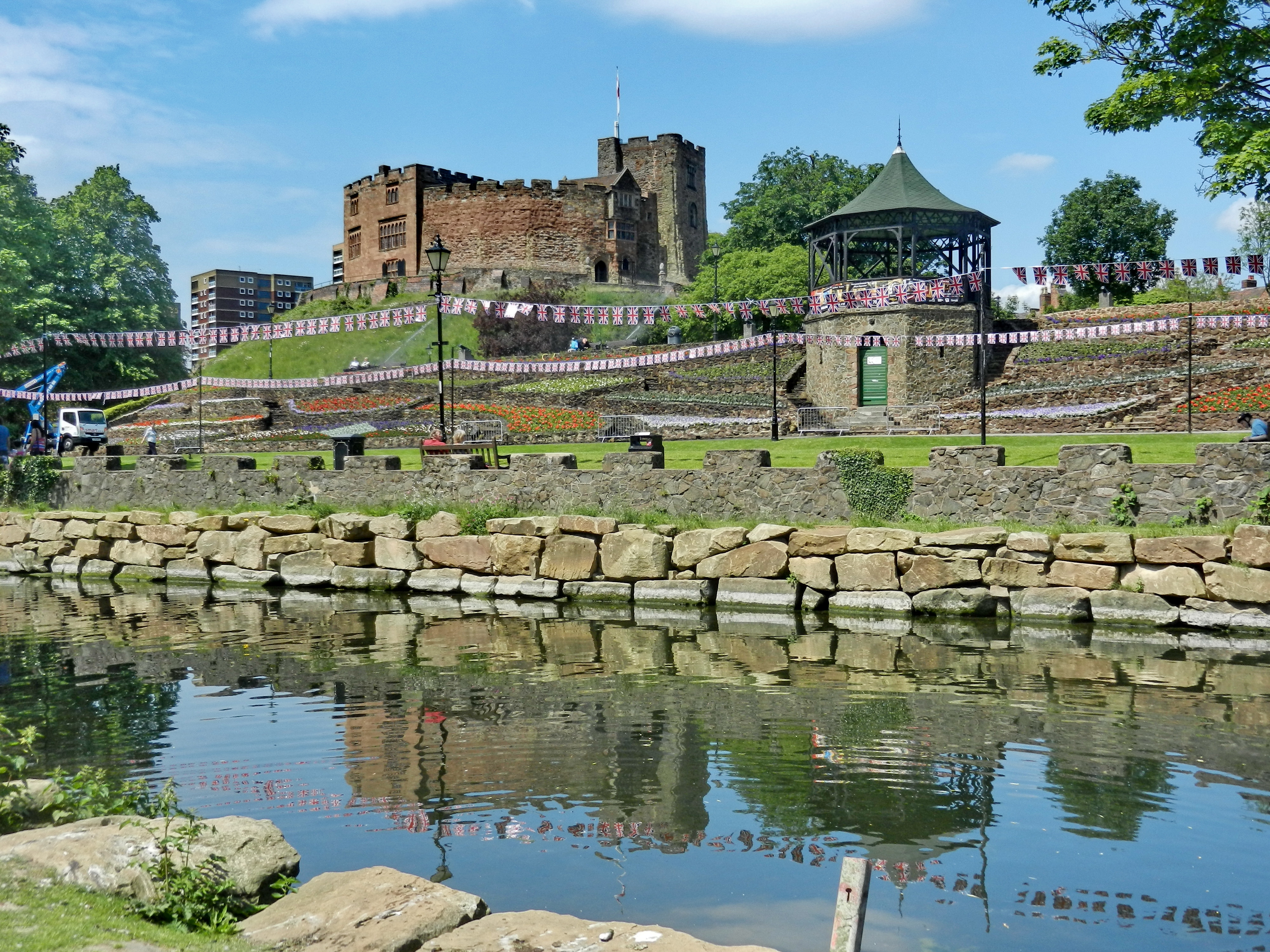
Tamworth castle

Robert Shirley was the eldest son of Hon. Robert Shirley (1673–1699) and his wife Anne Ferrers (d. 1698). He was born at Staunton Harold Hall. and inherited Tamworth Castle and other estates in Staffordshire upon his mother's death. Furthermore, he became the heir apparent to his grandfather, Lord Ferrers of Chartley, when his father died the following year. He was styled Viscount Tamworth after 1711, when his grandfather was created Earl Ferrers.

In 1713, when Sir Geoffrey Palmer, Member of Parliament for Leicestershire was forced to step down due to financial constraints, Tamworth was put forth by the Tories to replace him. At the time, the Tories held both Leicestershire seats; thorough canvassing on the part of Tamworth and some judicious payments quieted the Whig opposition, and Tamworth and the sitting member, Sir Thomas Cave, were returned without a poll. In the new Parliament, he was teller in favour of a supply bill on 22 June to grant Queen Anne 32 years of additional duties on various goods. Two weeks later, he was, like his father, stricken by smallpox and died on 5 July. He was buried at Staunton Harold. He left his estates, including Tamworth Castle, to his sister Elizabeth, who later married James Compton, 5th Earl of Northampton, and his personal property to his aunt, Lady Barbara Shirley (d. 1768).

Parliament of Great Britain
Preceded by Sir Geoffrey Palmer; Sir Thomas Cave	Member of Parliament for Leicestershire; 1713–1714; With: Sir Thomas Cave	Succeeded by Sir Thomas Cave; Sir Geoffrey Palmer
