= Lady Catherine Pelham =

British noble (died 1780)

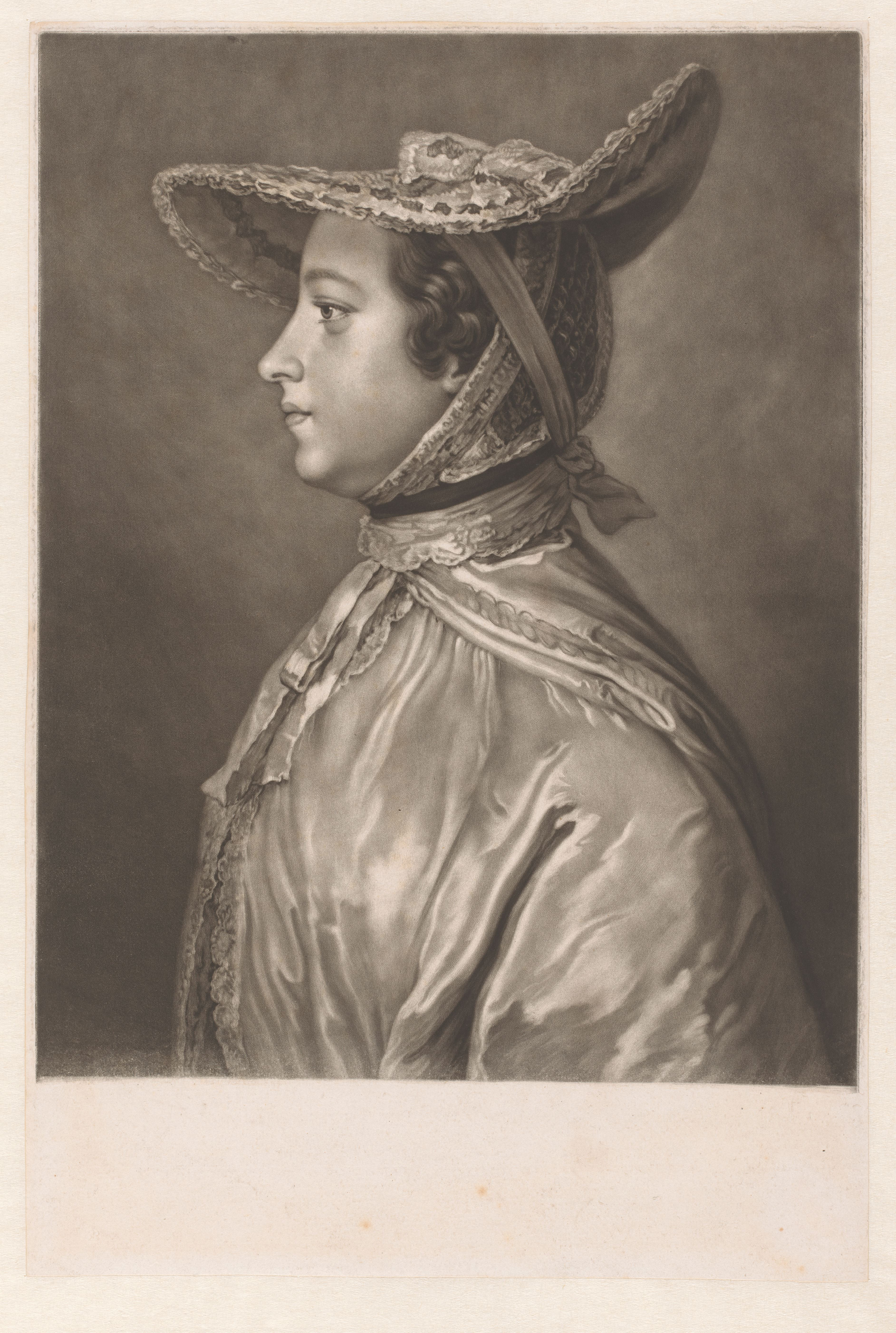
- Print portrait by James MacArdell, after a painting by William Hoare
- Born: 1700/1; England
- Died: 18 February 1780; England
- Resting place: All Saints Churchyard, Laughton, East Sussex
- Known for: Spouse of the prime minister of Great Britain (1743–1754)
- Spouse: Henry Pelham (m. 1726; died 1754)
- Children: 8 (four survived)
- Father: John Manners, 2nd Duke of Rutland

Lady Catherine Pelham (née Manners; also spelt as Katherine; 1700 or 1701 – 18 February 1780) was a British noble and the wife of the Prime Minister Henry Pelham. She used her position to broker positions within that administration and the following one.

== Life ==
Pelham was born in 1700 or 1701 and her parents were Catherine (née Russell) and John Manners, 2nd Duke of Rutland.

She had a dowry that was either £10,000 or £30,000 and she was from an important aristocratic family. Her maternal uncle was Wriothesley Russell, 2nd Duke of Bedford.

She married Henry Pelham who was the secretary of war in Sir Robert Walpole's government at St James, Westminster, London.

November 1739 was a bad month when she and Henry had two of their sons die within days of each other of what is now thought to be diphtheria. They had already lost a daughter and within months they lost another. Of their eight children only four daughters survived their childhood.

Her skills were in correspondence and in manipulating the attainment and distribution of patronage. She would plan ahead to see which positions were likely to become vacant and she would plan who was to receive the vacancy. Her unmarried daughters took positions and she became the Ranger of Greenwich Park in 1745. One of her achievements was to get John Roberts to be the candidate for the Harwich constituency. She had identified a vacancy and she had Prime Minister Newcastle's commitment that Roberts would be assigned the seat. However, in 1761, there was a new King and George III had his own mind for a candidate, Charles Townshend. It is a measure of Catherine's character that Newcastle could not decide who to please and who to disappoint. His solution was ingenious. There was one vacancy but Harwich returned two candidates. Newcastle persuaded the sitting candidate at Harwich, Thomas Sewell to move to Exeter so that he could then install both Catherine's and the King's candidate in Harwich. She died on 18 February 1780.

== Daughters ==
Of her four daughters, Frances who was born in 1728 and Mary who was born in 1739, died unmarried. Her daughter Catherine (1727–1760) became Catherine Pelham-Clinton, Countess of Clinton, when she married Henry Clinton, 9th Earl of Lincoln in 1744. Henry, by this marriage, would in time become the 2nd Duke of Newcastle-under-Lyme. Her fourth daughter Grace (1735–1777) became Grace Watson, Baroness Sondes when she married Hon. Lewis Watson in 1752. In 1760, Lewis was created Baron Sondes.
