= Edward Smith (MP) =

English Tory politician

Edward Smith (c. 1704 – 15 February 1762) was an English Tory politician who sat in the British House of Commons from 1734 to 1762.

Smith was the eldest son of Rev. Roger Smith of Bosworth and his wife Judith Tomlinson. He was educated at Melton Mowbray and at Rugby School. He matriculated at Magdalene College, Cambridge.

Smith was Member of Parliament (MP) for Leicestershire from 1734 until his death in 1762. He was unopposed in 1754 and 1761 when he was classed as a Tory.

Smith married Margaret Horsman, daughter of Edward Horsman of Stretton, Rutland. He lived at Edmondthorpe.

Parliament of Great Britain
Preceded by Lord William Manners; Ambrose Phillipps	Member of Parliament for Leicestershire; 1734–1762; With: Ambrose Phillipps 1734–1738; Lord Grey 1738–1739; Lord Guernsey 1739–1741; Sir Thomas Cave, Bt 1741–1747; Wrightson Mundy 1747–1754; Sir Thomas Palmer, Bt 1754–1762	Succeeded by Sir Thomas Palmer, Bt; Sir Thomas Cave, Bt
