= Sir Thomas Cave, 3rd Baronet =

British Tory politician (1681–1719)

Sir Thomas Cave, 3rd Baronet DL (19 April 1681 – 21 April 1719) of Stanford Hall, Leicestershire was a British Tory politician who sat in the House of Commons from 1711 to 1719.

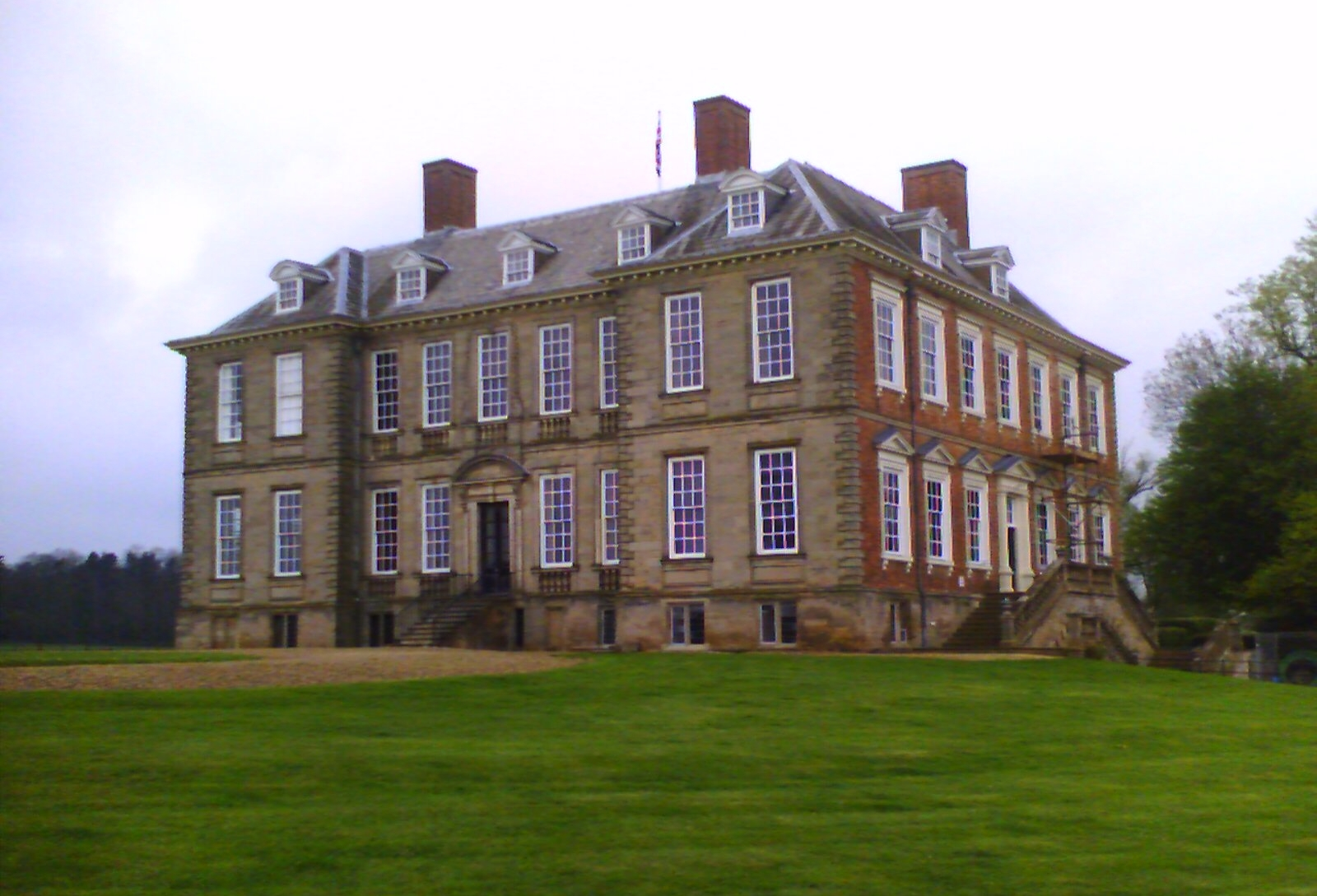
Stanford Hall, Leicestershire - seat of the Cave family

Cave was the eldest son of Sir Roger Cave, 2nd Baronet and his first wife Martha Browne, daughter of John Browne of Eydon, Northamptonshire. He was educated at Rugby School and matriculated at Christ Church, Oxford on 27 January 1699, aged 16. On 20 February 1703, Cave married Hon. Margaret Verney, youngest daughter of John Verney, 1st Viscount Fermanagh at St Giles's-in-the-Fields Church. He succeeded his father in the baronetcy on 11 October 1703.

Cave was appointed Deputy Lieutenant of Northamptonshire in 1705. He stood successfully for Leicestershire in a by-election on 20 February 1711 and was returned there unopposed at the 1713 general election. At the 1715 general election there was a contest for Leicestershire, but the Sheriff refused to make a return, claiming there had been a riot. Two months later, a fresh election was held at which Cave was returned in a contest. He represented the constituency until his death in 1719.

Cave died on 21 April 1719 aged 38, leaving heavy debts and was buried at Stanford, Northamptonshire. He had two sons and two daughters. He was succeeded in the baronetcy by his sons Verney and Sir Thomas Cave, 5th Baronet successively.

Parliament of Great Britain
Preceded by Sir Geoffrey Palmer; Marquess of Granby	Member of Parliament for Leicestershire; 1711–1719; With: Sir Geoffrey Palmer 1711–1713; Viscount Tamworth 1713–1714; Sir Geoffrey Palmer 1714–1719	Succeeded by Sir Geoffrey Palmer; Lord William Manners
Baronetage of England
Preceded by Roger Cave	Baronet (of Stanford); 1703–1719	Succeeded by Verney Cave
