= Sir Clobery Noel, 5th Baronet =

English Tory politician

Sir Clobery Noel, Bt

Member of Parliament for Leicestershire
- In office 1727–1733 Serving with Lord William Manners
- Preceded by: Edmund Morris; Lord William Manners
- Succeeded by: Ambrose Phillipps; Lord William Manners

Personal details
- Born: c. 1695
- Died: 30 July 1733 (aged 37–38)
- Spouse: Elizabeth Rowney (m. 1714)
- Children: Edward Noel, 1st Viscount Wentworth
- Parent(s): Sir John Noel, 4th Baronet; Mary Clobery
- Education: Magdalen College, Oxford

Sir Clobery Noel, 5th Baronet (c. 1695 – 30 July 1733), of Kirkby Mallory, Leicestershire, was an English Tory politician who sat in the House of Commons from 1727 to 1734.

== Early life ==
Noel was the eldest son of Sir John Noel, 4th Baronet and his wife Mary Clobery, daughter of Sir John Clobery of Winchester, Hampshire. His younger brother was William Noel, MP for Stamford and West Looe. His paternal grandparents were Sir William Noel, 2nd Baronet and the former Hon. Margaret Lovelace (a daughter of John Lovelace, 2nd Baron Lovelace of Hurley and Anne Lovelace, 7th Baroness Wentworth).

Upon the death of his father on 1 July 1697, Noel succeeded to the baronetcy. He matriculated at Magdalen College, Oxford on 30 December 1710, aged 15.

== Career ==
Noel was appointed Sheriff of Leicestershire in 1717. He was a Jacobite and in 1718 he and his brother-in-law Francis Mundy, ‘undertook to bring 2,000 men well mounted into the field in the county’ if there was an attempt to restore the Stuarts. At the 1727 British general election, he was returned as Member of Parliament for Leicestershire. Apart from the division on the civil list arrears in 1729, when he was absent, he voted against the Administration in all recorded divisions.

== Personal life ==
On 24 August 1714, Sir Clobery married Elizabeth Rowney, only daughter of Thomas Rowney, MP for Oxford. Her brother, Thomas Rowney, was also an MP for Oxford. Together, they were the parents of at least six sons and one daughter, including:

- Edward Noel, 1st Viscount Wentworth (1715–1774), who married Judith Lamb, a daughter of William Lamb, in 1744.

Noel died on 30 July 1733. He was succeeded in the baronetcy by his son Edward who subsequently succeeded to a peerage as Baron Wentworth.

Parliament of the United Kingdom
Preceded by Edmund Morris; Lord William Manners	Member of Parliament for Leicestershire with Lord William Manners; 1727–1733	Succeeded by Ambrose Phillipps; Lord William Manners
Baronetage of England
Preceded by John Noel	Baronet (of Kirkby Mallery); 1697–1733	Succeeded by Edward Noel
