= Edward Noel, 1st Viscount Wentworth =

British peer

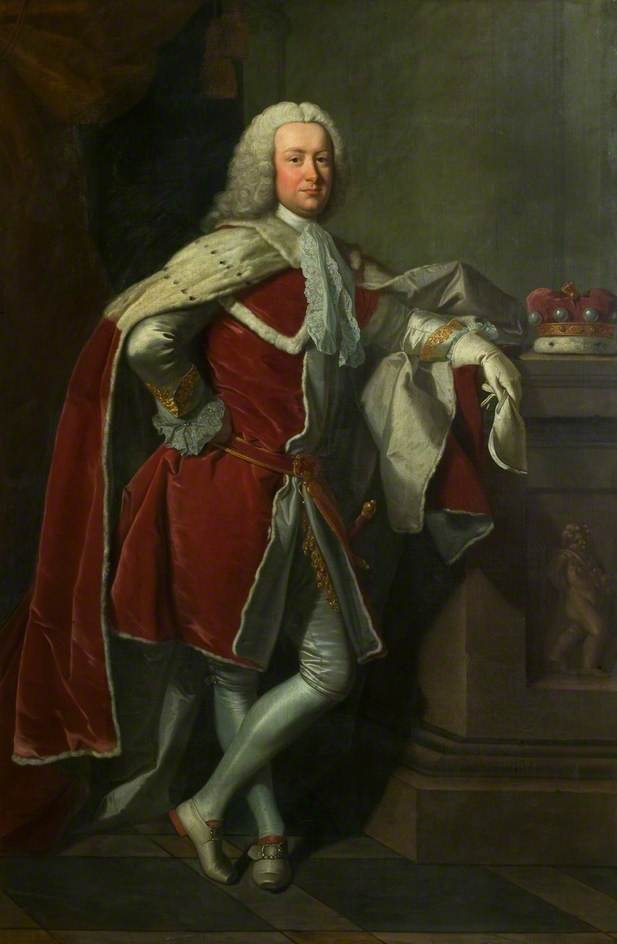
The Viscount Wentworth

Edward Noel, 1st Viscount Wentworth (30 August 1715 – 31 October 1774) was a British peer.

== Early life ==
Edward Noel was born on 30 August 1715. Wentworth was the eldest son (of six sons and a daughter) of Sir Clobery Noel, 5th Baronet, of Kirkby Mallory, and the former Elizabeth Rowney. His father served as MP for Leicestershire from 1727 until his death in 1733.

His paternal grandparents were Sir John Noel, 4th Baronet and the former Mary Clobery (daughter and co-heiress of Sir John Clobery, of Bradstone). His uncle was William Noel, MP for Stamford and West Looe. His maternal grandfather was Thomas Rowney, MP for Oxford.

He was educated at Eton College.

== Career ==
On 30 July 1733 he succeeded to his father's baronetcy. On 18 July 1745 he succeeded his first cousin twice removed, Martha Johnson, 8th Baroness Wentworth, as Baron Wentworth and assumed his seat in the House of Lords. On 5 May 1762 he was created Viscount Wentworth in the Peerage of Great Britain. Between 1770 and his death in 1774 he served as Chairman of Committees in the House of Lords.

== Personal life ==
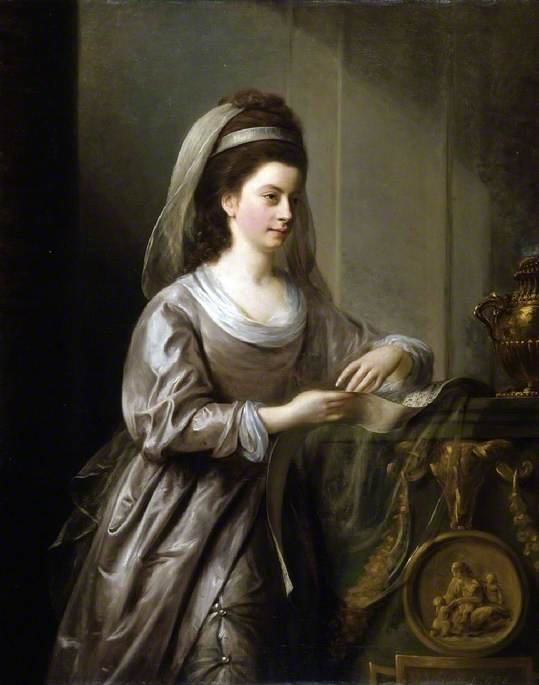
Portrait of his daughter, Hon. Sophia-Susanna Noel, by Nathaniel Hone the Elder, 1778

On 20 July 1744, he married Judith Lamb (1724/5–1761), daughter of William Lamb. Together, they were the parents of:

- Thomas Noel, 2nd Viscount Wentworth (1745–1815), who married Mary Ligonier, Countess of Ligonier (née Lady Mary Henley), widow of Edward Ligonier, 1st Earl Ligonier, and third daughter of Robert Henley, 1st Earl of Northington) in 1788.
- Hon. Judith Noel (1751–1822), who married Admiral Sir Ralph Milbanke, MP for County Durham, in 1777.
- Hon Elizabeth Noel (d. 1779), who married, as his first wife, Sir James Lamb, 1st Baronet, MP for Helston and Under-Secretary of State for Foreign Affairs, in 1777.
- Hon. Sophia Susanna Noel (1758–1782), who married Nathaniel Curzon, 2nd Baron Scarsdale, MP for Derbyshire, in 1777.

Upon his death on 21 October 1774, he was succeeded in his titles by his only son, Thomas Noel.

Peerage of Great Britain
New creation	Viscount Wentworth; 1762–1774	Succeeded by Thomas Noel
Peerage of England
Preceded by Martha Johnson	Baron Wentworth; 1745–1774	Succeeded by Thomas Noel
Baronetage of England
Preceded by Clobery Noel	Baronet (of Kirkby Mallery); 1733–1774	Succeeded by Thomas Noel
