= Edward Palmer (barrister) =

English barrister (1644–1667)

- Born: 1644
- Died: 1667 (aged 22–23)
- Citizenship: English
- Education: Middle Temple
- Occupation: Barrister
- Spouse: Mary Pitt

Edward Palmer (1644–1667), of the Middle Temple was an English barrister of the mid-17th century. He is recorded in the History of Parliament Online biographical register of legal professionals of the Restoration period and is also listed as a son of Sir Geoffrey Palmer, 1st Baronet, a prominent lawyer and politician of the era.

Palmer was baptized on 26 August 1644, the fourth son of Sir Geoffrey Palmer, 1st Baronet and Margaret née Moore. He was the brother of Geoffrey Palmer, a Ludgershall MP, and Sir Lewis Palmer, 2nd Baronet.

In 1660, Palmer entered the Middle Temple, one of the four Inns of Court responsible for the education and regulation of barristers in England, and was called to the bar in 1664.

By 15 May 1664, Palmer married Mary Pitt. The couple had no children.

Palmer died in 1667.
