= Topp baronets =

Extinct baronetcy in the Baronetage of England

The Topp Baronetcy, of Tormarton in the County of Gloucester, was a title in the Baronetage of England. It was created on 25 July 1668 for Francis Topp. The title became extinct on the death of the third Baronet in 1733.

== Topp baronets, of Tormarton (1668) ==
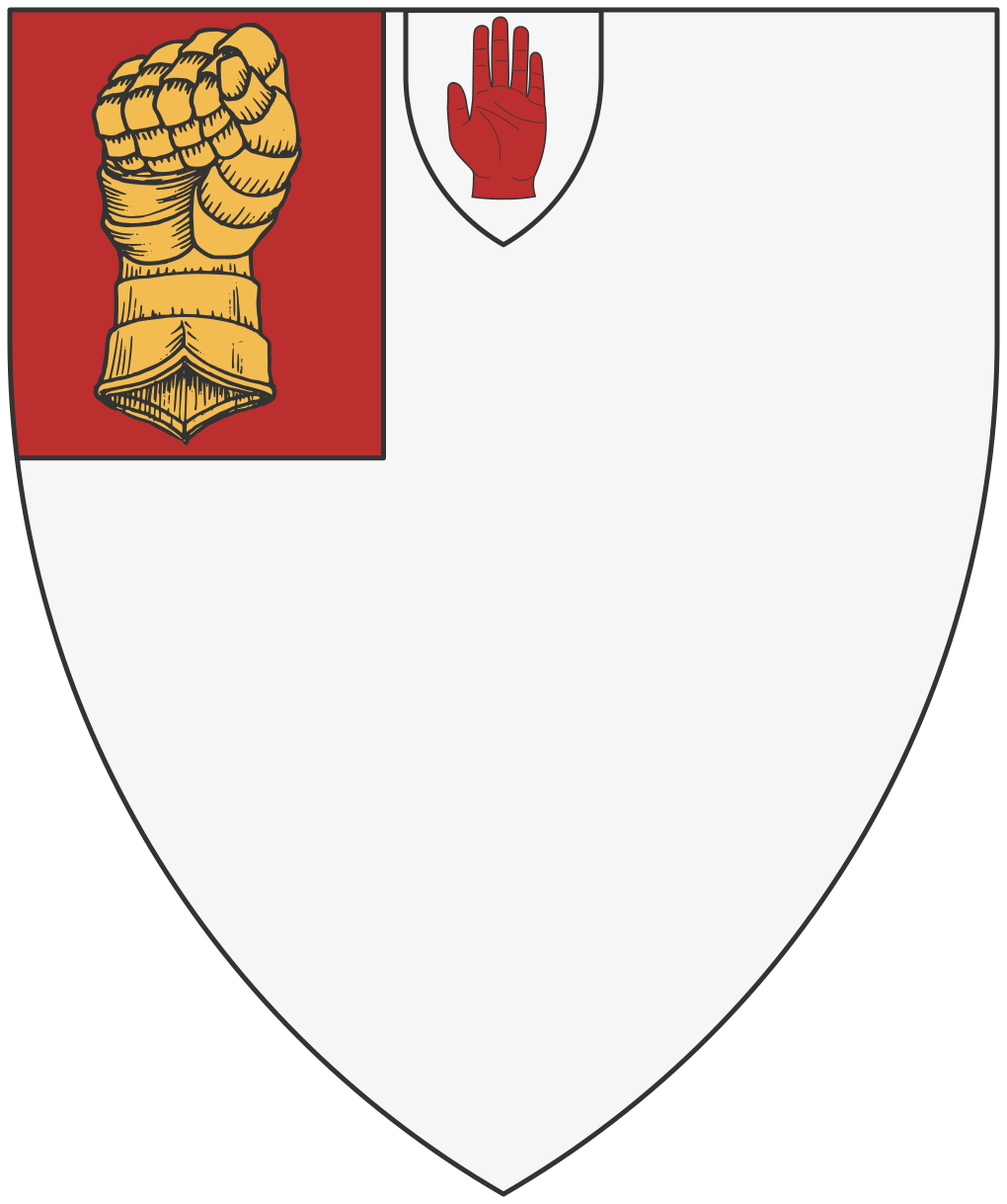
Arms of Topp of Tormarton

- Sir Francis Topp, 1st Baronet (died c. 1676)
- Sir John Topp, 2nd Baronet (c. 1663–c. 1720)
- Sir Jeremy Topp, 3rd Baronet (died 1733)

== Baronetcies ==
- Leigh Rayment's list of baronets – Baronetcies beginning with "T" (part 2)
