= George Ashby (MP) =

English politician

George Ashby (16 July 1656 – 11 February 1728) was an English politician.

He was born the son of George Ashby of Quenby Hall, Leicestershire and educated at Trinity College, Cambridge and Gray's Inn.

He was appointed Sheriff of Leicestershire for 1689 and 1699. He was member of parliament (MP) for Leicestershire from 1695 to 1698 and from 1707 to 1708.

He died in 1728 and was buried at Hungarton, Leicestershire. He had married Hannah, the daughter and coheiress of Edmund Waring of Umphriston, Shropshire, with whom he had four surviving sons and four daughters.

Parliament of Great Britain
Preceded by John Verney and John Wilkins	Member of Parliament for Leicestershire; 1707–1708; With: John Wilkins	Succeeded by Sir Geoffrey Palmer and John Wilkins
