= Geoffrey Palmer (Ludgershall MP) =

English politician (1642–1661)

Member of Parliament for Ludgershall
- In office March 1661 – October 1661

Personal details
- Born: 1642
- Died: 31 October 1661 (age 19)
- Relations: Edward Palmer (brother)

Geoffrey Palmer (1642–1661) was an English politician, the eldest surviving son of Sir Geoffrey Palmer, 1st Baronet, Attorney General to King Charles II.

Geoffrey Palmer was baptised 28 February 1642, the third son of Sir Geoffrey Palmer and brother of barrister Edward Palmer.

Palmer was elected to Parliament for Ludgershall in March 1661, but he died on 31 October 1661 at the age of 19.
