= Bale baronets =

Extinct baronetcy in the Baronetage of England

Escutcheon of the Bale baronets of Carleton Curlieu

The Bale Baronetcy, of Carleton Curlieu in the County of Leicester, was a title in the Baronetage of England. It was created on 3 November 1643 for John Bale of Carlton Curlieu Hall, Leicestershire, who had been High Sheriff of Leicestershire in 1624. The title became extinct on his death in 1679.

== Bale baronets, of Carleton Curlieu (1643) ==
- Sir John Bale, 1st Baronet (c.1617–1679)
