= Thomas Noel, 2nd Viscount Wentworth =

British politician

The Right Honourable The Viscount Wentworth

Member of Parliament for Leicestershire
- In office 1774–1774 Serving with Sir John Palmer, Bt
- Preceded by: Sir Thomas Cave, Bt; Sir John Palmer, Bt
- Succeeded by: Sir John Palmer, Bt; John Peach-Hungerford

Personal details
- Born: Thomas Noel; 18 November 1745
- Died: 17 April 1815 (aged 69)
- Spouse(s): Mary, Dowager Countess Ligonier (m. 1788; died 1814)
- Children: Thomas Noel
- Parent(s): Edward Noel, 1st Viscount Wentworth; Judith Lamb
- Education: Eton College
- Alma mater: Brasenose College, Oxford

Thomas Noel, 2nd Viscount Wentworth (18 November 1745 – 17 April 1815) was a British politician who succeeded to a peerage before he could take his seat in the House of Commons, having just been elected in 1774.

== Early life ==
Wentworth was the only son of Edward Noel, 1st Viscount Wentworth and his wife, Judith Lamb, daughter of William Lamb of Wellesborough, Leicestershire. His sister, the Hon. Judith Noel, married Sir Ralph Milbanke, 6th Baronet.

He was educated at Eton and, having matriculated at Brasenose College, Oxford on 4 November 1763, was awarded MA on 29 April 1766.

== Career ==
At the 1774 general election, Noel successfully contested Leicestershire and was returned as Member of Parliament. However, he had to leave the Commons within a month when he succeeded to the peerage on the death of his father on 31 October.

== Personal life ==
On 2 February 1788, Wentworth married Mary Ligonier, Dowager Countess Ligonier, a daughter of Robert Henley, 1st Earl of Northington and widow of Edward Ligonier, 1st Earl Ligonier (of the second creation). The union did not produce any children, although Wentworth had fathered an illegitimate son, Thomas Noel (1774–1853), who became rector of Kirkby Mallory. There he conducted the marriage ceremony of his cousin, Anne Isabella Milbanke, to Lord Byron in 1815.

Upon his death in 1815 aged 69, Lord Wentworth's viscountcy became extinct, whilst the barony of Wentworth became abeyant between his nephew Hon. Nathaniel Curzon (later Lord Curzon) and his sister, Judith (and after her, her daughter Anne Isabella Byron, Baroness Byron). When Judith died in 1822 and then Lord Curzon died without heirs in 1856, the abeyance was terminated in favour of Anne.

Parliament of Great Britain
Preceded by Sir Thomas Cave, Bt; Sir John Palmer, Bt	Member of Parliament for Leicestershire; 1774; With: Sir John Palmer, Bt	Succeeded by Sir John Palmer, Bt; John Peach-Hungerford
Peerage of Great Britain
Preceded by Edward Noel	Viscount Wentworth; 1774–1815	Extinct
Peerage of England
Preceded by Edward Noel	Baron Wentworth; 1774-1815	In abeyance Title next held by Anne Isabella Byron
