= 1747 British general election =

1747 general election in Great Britain

- 26 June – 4 August 1747

All 558 seats in the House of Commons 280 seats needed for a majority
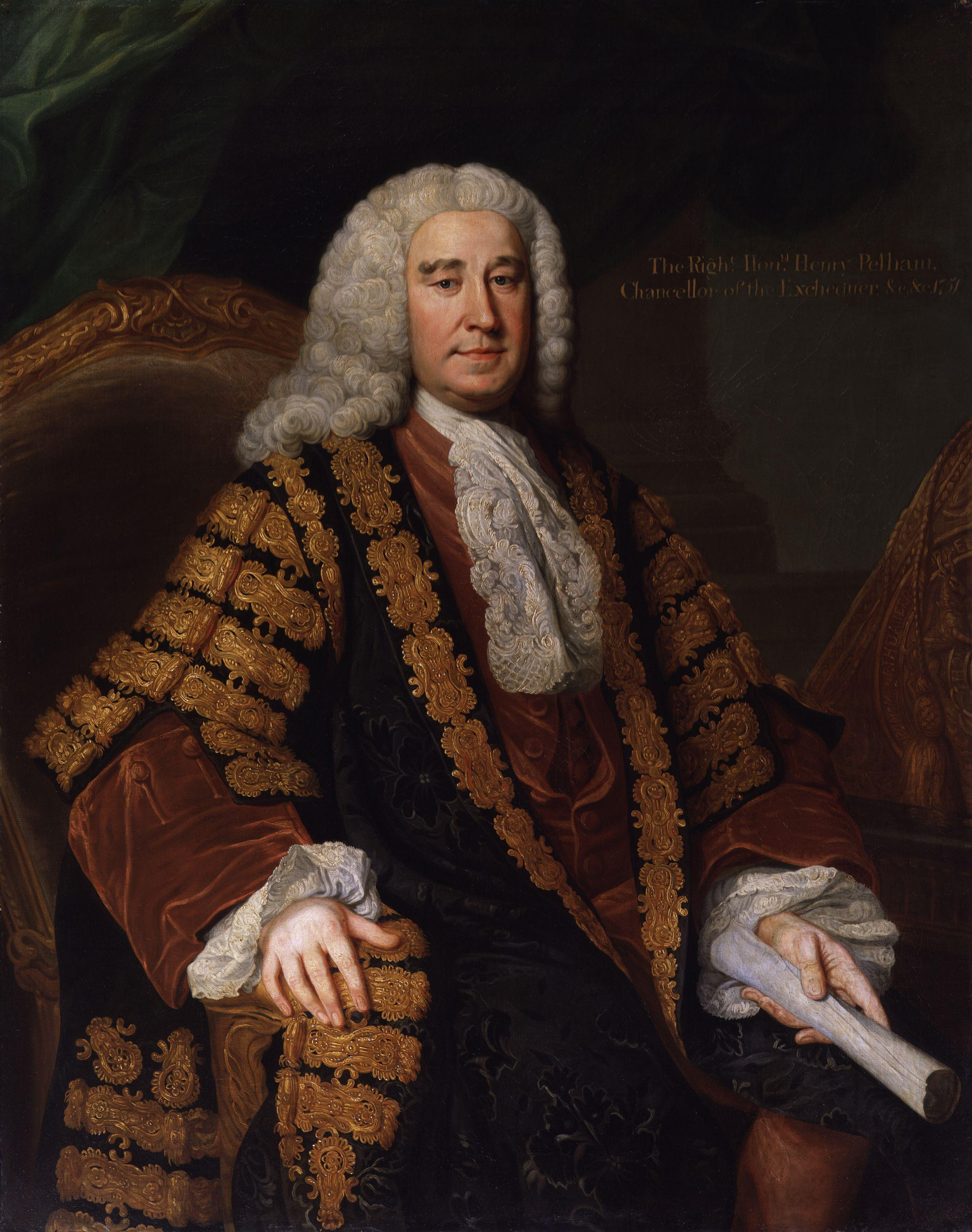

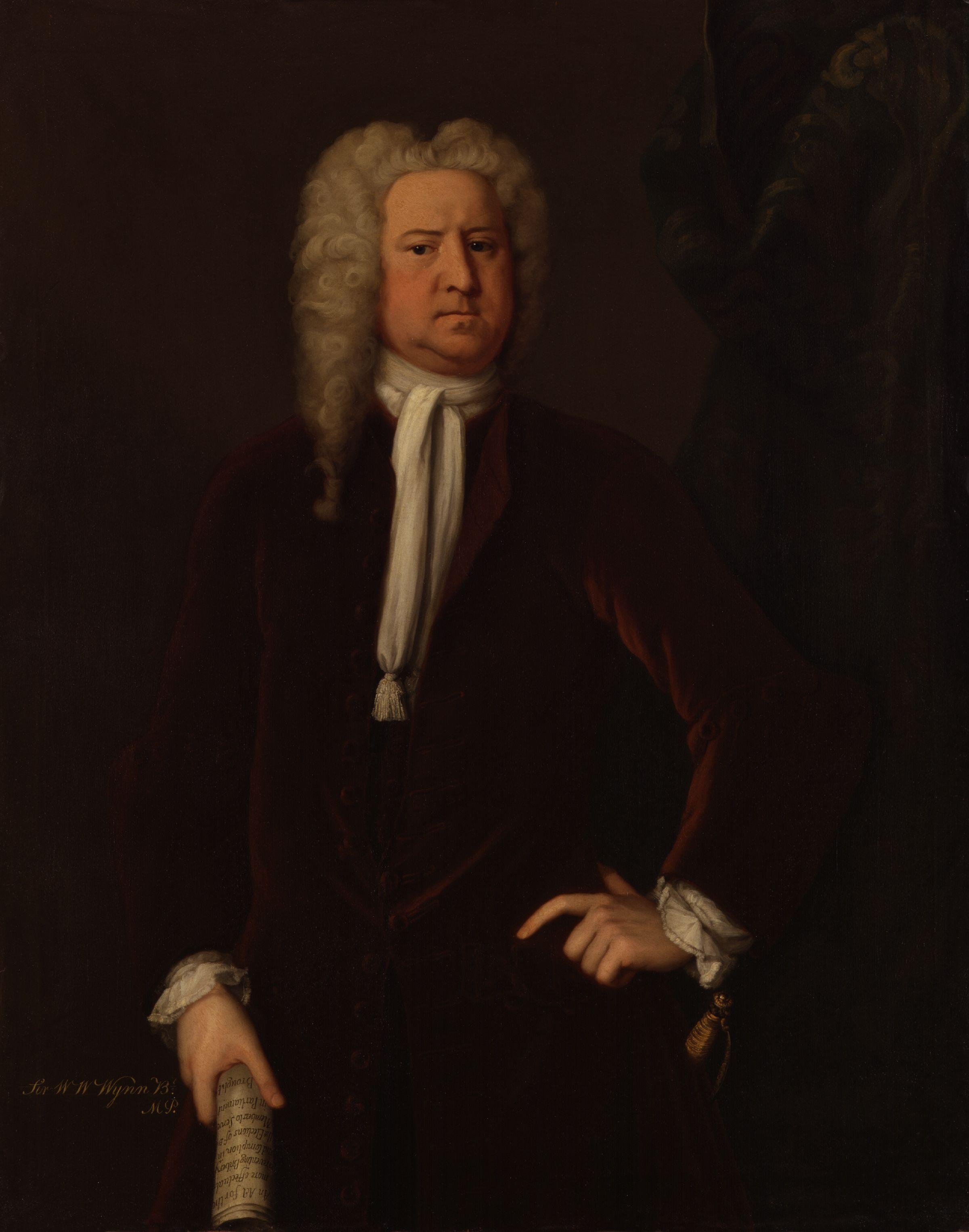
	First party	Second party	Third party
			Pat
Leader	Henry Pelham	Sir Watkin Williams-Wynn	—
Party	Whig	Tory	Patriot Whigs
Leader's seat	Sussex	Denbighshire	—
Seats won	338	117	94
Seat change	▲52	▼19	▼37
- Composition of the House of Commons after the election
Prime Minister before election
Henry Pelham
Whig
Prime Minister after election
Henry Pelham
Whig

The 1747 British general election returned members to serve in the House of Commons of the 10th Parliament of Great Britain to be summoned, after the merger of the Parliament of England and the Parliament of Scotland in 1707. The election saw Henry Pelham's Whig government increase its majority and the Tories continue their decline. By 1747, thirty years of Whig oligarchy and systematic corruption had weakened party ties substantially; despite that Walpole, the main reason for the split that led to the creation of the Patriot Whig faction, had resigned, there were still almost as many Whigs in opposition to the ministry as there were Tories, and the real struggle for power was between various feuding factions of Whig aristocrats rather than between the old parties. The Tories had effectively become an irrelevant group of country gentlemen who had resigned themselves to permanent opposition.

== Summary of the constituencies ==
See 1796 British general election for details. The constituencies used were the same throughout the existence of the Parliament of Great Britain.

== Dates of election ==
The general election was held between 26 June 1747 and 4 August 1747.

At this period elections did not take place at the same time in every constituency. The returning officer in each county or parliamentary borough fixed the precise date (see hustings for details of the conduct of the elections).

== Results ==

=== Seats summary ===
Parliamentary seats
Whig	60.6%
Tory	21.0%
Patriot	16.8%

== See also ==
- List of parliaments of Great Britain
