= Henry Pelham =

Prime Minister of Great Britain from 1743 to 1754

The Right Honourable Henry Pelham FRS
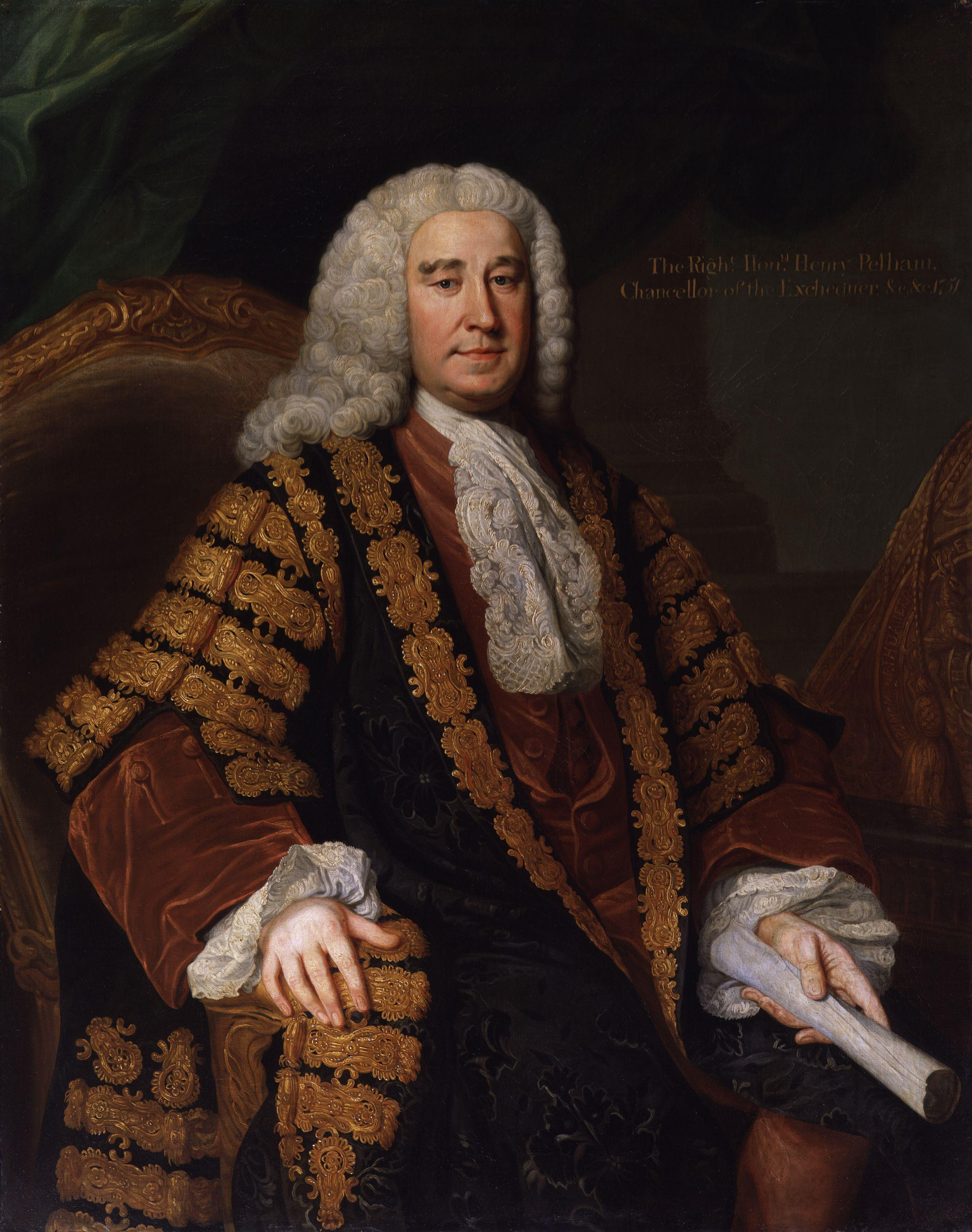
- Portrait of Henry Pelham by William Hoare, 1751

Prime Minister of Great Britain
- In office 27 August 1743 – 6 March 1754
- Monarch: George II
- Preceded by: The Earl of Wilmington
- Succeeded by: The Duke of Newcastle

Chancellor of the Exchequer
- In office 12 December 1743 – 6 March 1754
- Monarch: George II
- Prime Minister: Himself
- Preceded by: Samuel Sandys
- Succeeded by: William Lee

Personal details
- Born: 25 September 1694 Laughton, Sussex, England
- Died: 6 March 1754 (aged 59) Westminster, England
- Resting place: All Saints' Church, Laughton, East Sussex, England
- Party: Whig
- Spouse: Catherine Manners (m. 1726)
- Children: 4
- Parent: Thomas Pelham, 1st Baron Pelham (father)
- Education: King's College, Cambridge; Hart Hall, Oxford

Henry Pelham (25 September 1694 – 6 March 1754) was a British Whig statesman who served as Prime Minister of Great Britain from 1743 until his death in 1754. He was the younger brother of Thomas Pelham-Holles, 1st Duke of Newcastle, who served in Pelham's government and succeeded him as prime minister. Pelham is generally considered to have been Britain's third prime minister, after Robert Walpole and the Earl of Wilmington.

Pelham's premiership was relatively uneventful in terms of domestic affairs, although it was during his premiership that Great Britain experienced the tumult of the 1745 Jacobite uprising. In foreign affairs, Britain fought in several wars. Two of Pelham's final acts were the Jewish Naturalization Act 1753, which allowed Jews to become naturalized by application to Parliament, and the Marriage Act 1753, which enumerated the minimum age of consent for marriage. On Pelham's death, his brother Newcastle took full control of the British government.

== Early life ==
Pelham, Newcastle's younger brother, was a younger son of Thomas Pelham, 1st Baron Pelham, and his wife, the former Grace Pelham, Baroness Pelham of Laughton, the daughter of Gilbert Holles, 3rd Earl of Clare, and Grace Pierrepont. Pelham's father, Thomas, died when he was 12 years of age. Pelham inherited £5,000 and small annuities for life while a large part of the estate went to his elder brother, the Duke Newcastle.

He was educated at Westminster School, and matriculated at King's College, Cambridge at Easter 1709, then migrated to Hart Hall, Oxford (the present-day Hertford College), matriculating on 6 September 1710, upon the appointment of his tutor Richard Newton as Principal of Hart Hall.

== Political career ==
=== Member of Parliament ===
As a volunteer he served in Dormer's regiment at the Battle of Preston in 1715 and spent some time on the Continent. He was returned as Member of Parliament for Seaford in Sussex by his brother, the Duke of Newcastle, at a by-election on 28 February 1717 and represented it until 1722.

On 20 May 1720, Pelham made his first speech in the House of Commons. It was made during a time of union for the Whigs, which was achieved by a call for discharging the civil list debt, a motion supported by both Pelham and Walpole. On 15 March 1721, Pelham aided Walpole in getting the Earl of Sunderland's acquittal from charges of bribery.

The first position Pelham held was as Treasurer of the Chamber in 1720. The advancement came as a result of his brother's influence. Newcastle and Pelham lost £2,000 in the South Sea Bubble.

=== In government ===
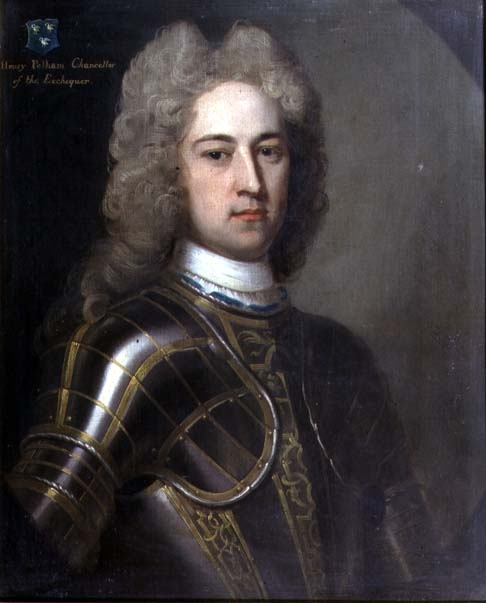
Pelham by Michael Dahl, c. 1720

Through strong family influence, and the recommendation of Robert Walpole, he was chosen in 1721 as Lord of the Treasury. At the 1722 general election he was returned as MP for Sussex county.

In 1724, he entered the ministry as Secretary at War, a position he held for the next 6 years. Many of the problems that Pelham faced in that office was regarding legal affairs of the British Army, which concerned enlistments, courts-martial, mutiny, desertion, the jurisdiction of army officials and civil magistrates and the commutation powers of the King.

Pelham asserted his independent function in the ministry by voting against one of Walpole's measures to reduce interest on the national debt. In 1729, Pelham proposed placing 17,000 troops and later commanded the debate to continue paying the 12,000 Hessian troops for another year. He was criticised and denounced by William Shippen, a Jacobite member of Parliament, for the government's military policies. When Walpole introduced a bill in the Commons to increase revenue by placing excise tax on salt, it was met with fierce opposition and the sole responsibility of defending the government fell on Pelham's shoulders. He continued to support the bill despite its deep unpopularity - he was publicly rebuked for his decision to support the measure.

But following the resignation of Townshend, he exchanged his then position, in 1730 for the more lucrative one of Paymaster of the Forces. He made himself conspicuous by his support of Walpole on the question of the excise. He, Newcastle, and the Prime Minister would often meet at Houghton Hall in Norfolk, where they would draw up much of the country's policy. These meetings became known as the Norfolk Congress. With Walpole, he served as a founding governor of the popular charity the Foundling Hospital when it opened its doors in 1739. Like his brother, the Duke of Newcastle, Pelham was an active freemason of the Premier Grand Lodge of England, active alongside John Theophilus Desaguliers.

In 1742 a union of parties resulted in the formation of an administration in which Pelham became Prime Minister and First Lord of the Treasury the following year, succeeding the Earl of Wilmington after his death.

== Prime Minister ==
=== Appointment ===
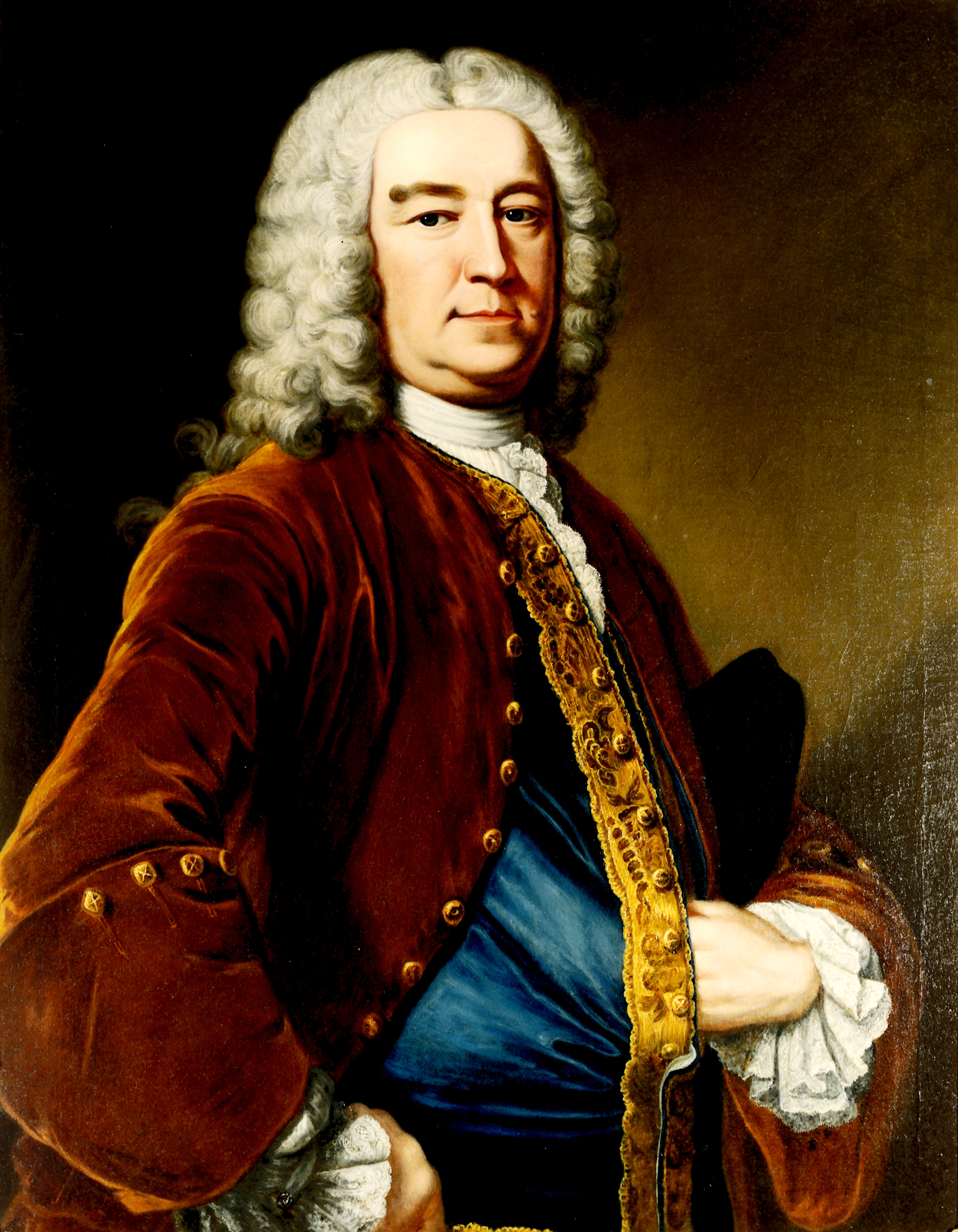
Pelham, attributed to John Giles Eccardt

The first year of Pelham's premiership is regarded as a continuation of the Carteret ministry, with Lord Carteret continuing as Secretary of State for the Northern Department with responsibility for foreign affairs; Carteret was close to King George II. Pelham served as First Lord of the Treasury, Chancellor of the Exchequer and Leader of the House of Commons.

In November 1744, the Pelhams forced Lord Carteret out of the ministry: Pelham bluntly told the king that either Carteret step down, or the Pelhamites would, leaving His Majesty without a government. Thereafter Pelham shared power with his brother, the Duke of Newcastle upon Tyne. Pelham was regarded as the leading figure, but rank and influence made his brother very powerful in the Cabinet. In spite of a genuine attachment, there were occasional disputes between them, which sometimes led to further difficulties.

=== "The Broad-Bottomed Administration" ===
Being strongly in favour of peace, Pelham carried on the War of the Austrian Succession with languor and indifferent success, but the country, wearied of the interminable struggle, was disposed to acquiesce in his foreign policy almost without a murmur. King George II, thwarted in his own favourite schemes, made overtures in February 1746 to Lord Bath, but his purpose was upset by the resignation of the two Pelhams (Henry and Newcastle), who, after a two-day hiatus in which Bath and Carteret (now earl Granville) proved unable to form a ministry, resumed office at the king's request. One of their terms was to insist that the king should have 'total confidence' in a ministry; rather than partial grudging acceptance of the Whigs.

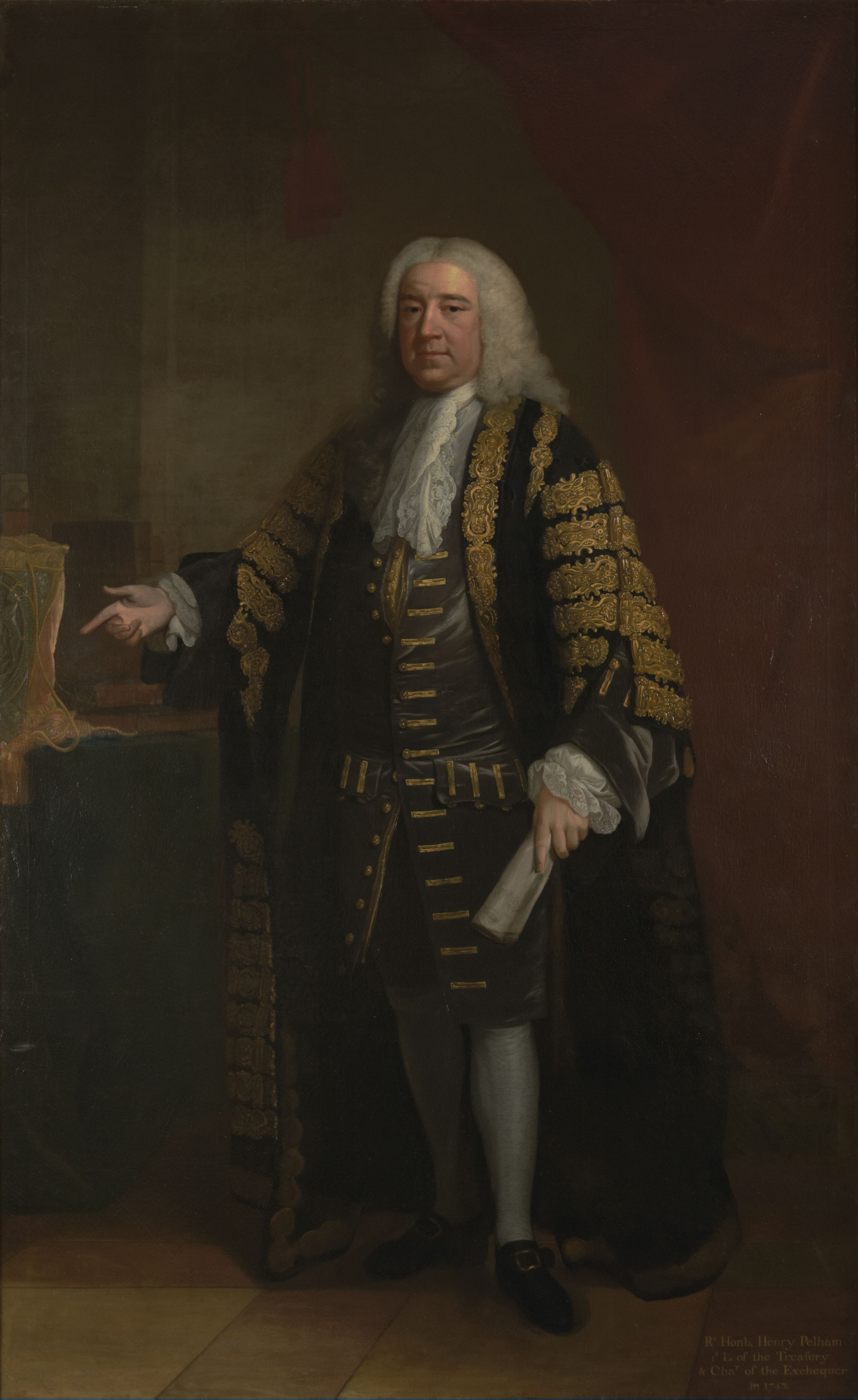
Henry Pelham, by William Hoare, c. 1743

The Augustan era was essential to the development of prime ministerial power as being entirely dependent on a Commons majority, rather than royal prerogative interventions. While the king struggled with his headstrong son, Frederick, Prince of Wales, his son's uncertain constitutional position was high in the Leicester House party set. In 1748 Frederick, a Tory, planned to bring down the Pelhamites at a general election due the following year. The Prime Minister called an early poll in 1748 by asking the king to dissolve Parliament in 1747. The prince and his father, the king, grew to hate one another with unspeakable animosity. But one consequence was a closer relationship between Henry Pelham and the sovereign. When he finally died in 1754, the king remarked "Now I shall have no more peace." The Treaty of Aix-la-Chapelle had been signed in 1748 leading inexorably to a number of cost-cutting budgetary measures.

=== Economic reform ===
The British Army and Royal Navy spending shrunk from £12 m to £7 million per annum. Pelham promised to reduce interest rates through introduction of a balancing act measure from 4% to 3% by 1757. He also assisted a fund to reduce the national debt. In 1749, the Navy Act 1748 was passed, reorganising the Royal Navy. On 20 March 1751, the British calendar was reorganised as well (New Year's Day became 1 January); Britain would adopt the Gregorian calendar one year later. In 1752 he was able to reduce the land tax from 4 s to 2 s in the pound (an effective reduction from 20% to 10%).

One social consequence of the press gangs going to sea in an expansive navy fleet was the growth of industrial processes necessary for warfare. The distillation of gin reduced the price of alcohol, resulting in widespread drunkenness, demonstrated clearly by William Hogarth in "Gin Lane". Preaching in favour of temperance, and social problems caused by drunken soldiers and sailors, persuaded the administration to introduce the Gin Acts. The Gin Act 1751 was the last of four that had largely failed to prevent serious social unrest, including riots in London, reduced the number licensed dealers and sellers of liquor. By restricting supply the consumption dropped and price fell helping to manage the problem.

=== Final session and opposition press (1753) ===
Pelham’s final session saw passage of the Jewish Naturalization Act 1753 and the Marriage Act 1753. On 20 July 1753 he told his brother, the Duke of Newcastle, that attacks in the opposition weekly The Protester “gave [him] not the least concern” and that “the less notice is taken of him the better”. Later that year, despite Pelham’s objections, Newcastle approved a Treasury pension to end James Ralph’s political writing.

=== Death ===
Upon his death, his brother (the aforementioned Duke of Newcastle upon Tyne) took over government.

=== Achievements ===
His very defects were among the chief elements of Pelham's success, for one with a strong personality, moderate amount self-respect, or haughty conceptions of statesmanship could not have restrained the discordant elements of the cabinet for any length of time the way he did. Moreover, he possessed tact and a thorough acquaintance with the forms of the House of Commons. Whatever quarrels or insubordination might have existed within the cabinet, they never broke out into open revolt. His foreign policy followed Walpole's model of emphasizing peace and ending wars. His financial policy was a major success once peace had been signed in 1748 to end the War of the Austrian Succession. He demobilized the armed forces, and reduced government spending from £12 million to £7 million. He refinanced the national debt dropping the interest from 4% to 3%. In 1752 he reduced the land tax from four shillings to two shillings in the pound; that is, from 20% to 10%. Historians Stephen Brumwell and W. A. Speck describe him as being an effective politician:

His subdued manner concealed a shrewd and calculating politician. He was reserved and cautious, but behind the reserve was steel. All agreed on his integrity, which was remarkable in a venal age; unlike Walpole, he died relatively poor.

== Personal life ==
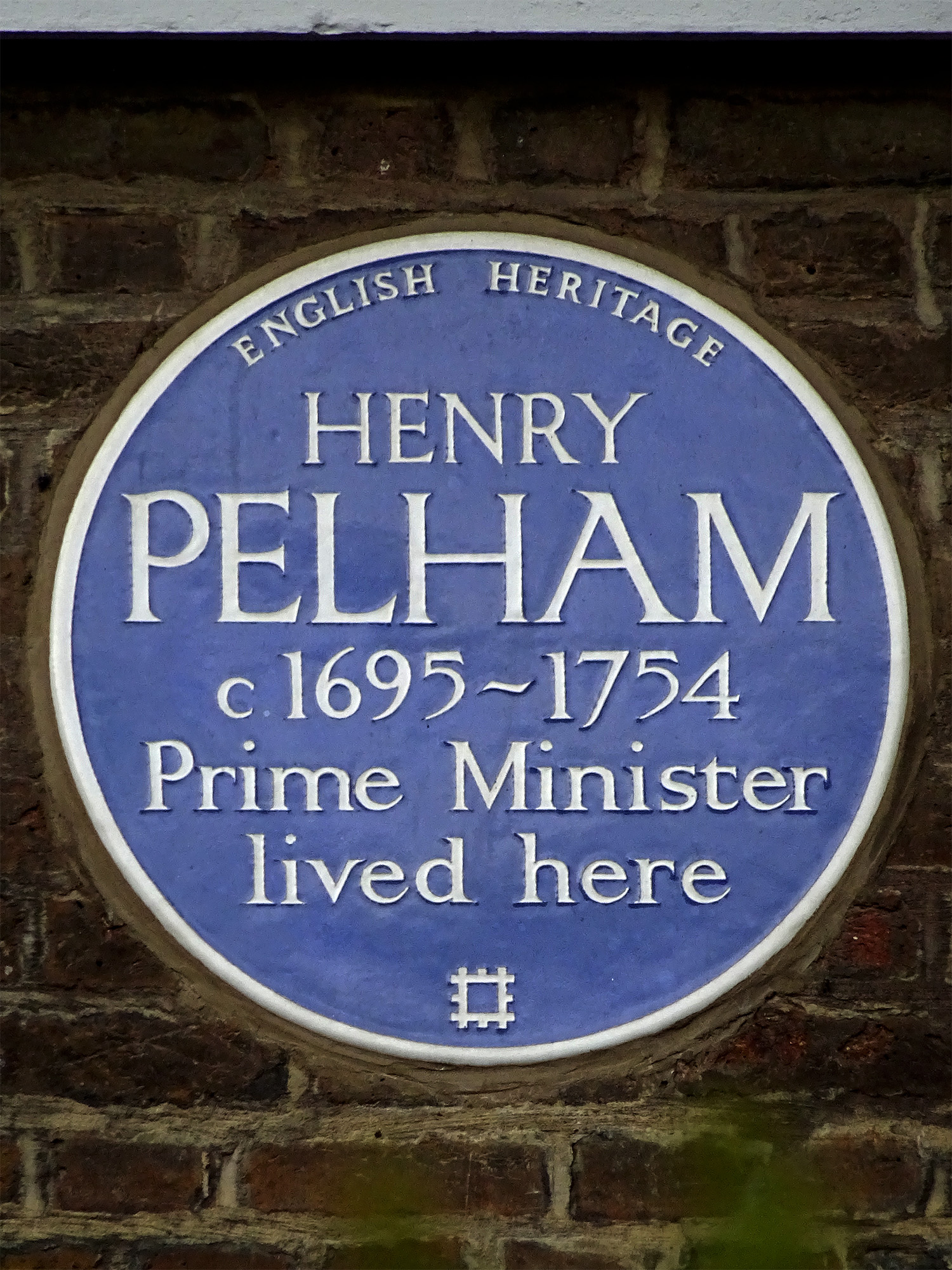
Blue plaque located at Henry Pelham’s home in Westminster

Pelham married Lady Catherine Manners, daughter of the 2nd Duke of Rutland, on 31 October 1726 in the Parish of St James, City of Westminster. They had four daughters:

- Catherine Pelham-Clinton, Countess of Clinton (1727–1760), married 1744 Henry Clinton, 9th Earl of Lincoln, who by this marriage subsequently became the 2nd Duke of Newcastle (Newcastle-under-Lyme)
- Frances (1728–1775), died unmarried
- Grace Watson, Baroness Sondes (1735–1777), married 1752 the Hon. Lewis Watson, who in 1760 was created Baron Sondes
- Mary (1739–1???), died unmarried

When Pelham was elevated to Prime Minister, he began construction of a house located at 22 Arlington Street in St James's, Westminster. He hired the architect William Kent to build the structure in two phases. Kent died in 1748 and the work was completed by Stephen Wright in 1754.

Pelham died in 1754 and was buried in All Saints' Church, Laughton, East Sussex. His personal papers were inherited by his son-in-law and now form part of the Newcastle (Clumber) Collection held at the department of Manuscripts and Special Collections, The University of Nottingham.

== Legacy ==
He was one of the first of a relatively few prime ministers who never acceded to a peerage. Others include George Grenville (died as an MP), William Pitt the Younger (died in office), Spencer Perceval (died in office), George Canning (died in office), Sir Robert Peel (died as an MP, though was a baronet in his own right), William Ewart Gladstone (declined a peerage), Sir Henry Campbell-Bannerman (declined a peerage but died as an MP), Bonar Law (died as an MP), Ramsay MacDonald (died as an MP), Neville Chamberlain (declined a peerage but died as an MP), Sir Winston Churchill (declined a peerage), Sir Edward Heath (declined a peerage), Sir John Major (declined a peerage), Sir Tony Blair (declined a peerage), Gordon Brown (declined a peerage), Boris Johnson, and Liz Truss.

Prime Minister Henry Pelham was played by Roger Allam, as depicted in the 2011 film Pirates of the Caribbean: On Stranger Tides.

== Ancestry ==
Ancestors of Henry Pelham

8. Sir Thomas Pelham, 2nd Baronet, of Laughton
4. Sir John Pelham, 3rd Baronet, of Laughton
9. Mary Wilbraham
2. Thomas Pelham, 1st Baron Pelham
10. Robert Sydney, 2nd Earl of Leicester
5. Lady Lucy Sydney
11. Lady Dorothy Percy
1. Henry Pelham
12. John Holles, 2nd Earl of Clare
6. Gilbert Holles, 3rd Earl of Clare
13. Hon. Elizabeth Vere
3. Lady Grace Holles
14. Hon. William Pierrepont
7. Grace Pierrepont
15. Elizabeth Harries

== Arms ==
Coat of arms of Pelham, of Laughton, Sussex
Crest A peacock in his pride argent. Escutcheon Quarterly, 1 & 3, Azure, three pelicans argent vulning themselves in the breast gules; 2 & 3, Gules, two belts issuing out of the base argent, buckles and studs or. Motto Vicit amor patriæ (The love of my country prevails).

== Sources ==
- Ballantyne, Archibald. Lord Carteret: A Political Biography 1690 to 1763 (1887) online
- Coxe, William, Memoirs of the administration of the Right Honourable Henry Pelham, collected from the family papers, and other authentic documents (2 vol. 1829) online
- Leonard, Dick. "Henry Pelham—Pragmatic Heir to Walpole." in Dick Leonard, ed. Eighteenth-Century British Premiers (Palgrave Macmillan UK, 2011) pp. 40–53.
- Marshall, Dorothy. Eighteenth Century England (2nd ed. 1974) political history 1714–1784,
- Owen, John Beresford (1957). The Rise of the Pelhams (2nd ed.). Methuen & Co Ltd.
- Wilkes, John (1964). A Whig in Power: The Political Career of Henry Pelham. London: Northwestern University Press.
- Williams, Basil (1962). The Whig Supremacy, 1714-1760 (2nd ed.). Oxford University Press. OCLC 222038800.
- Some material has been adapted from the 1911 Encyclopædia Britannica.
- Sedgwick, Romney R. "PELHAM, Hon. Henry (1695-1754), of Esher Place, Surr". History of Parliament Online. Archived from the original on 23 January 2022.
- Kulisheck, A. J. "Pelham, Henry". Oxford Dictionary of National Biography (online ed.). Oxford University Press. doi:10.1093/ref:odnb/21789. (Subscription, Wikipedia Library access or UK public library membership required.); cited as PelODNB.
- "Henry Pelham". Encyclopedia Britannica. The Editors of Encyclopedia Britannica. 28 July 1999.

Political offices
Preceded by The Earl of Radnor	Treasurer of the Chamber; 1720–1722	Succeeded by Charles Stanhope
Preceded by Thomas Trevor	Secretary at War; 1724–1730	Succeeded by Sir William Strickland
Preceded by The Lord Wilmington	Paymaster of the Forces; 1730–1743	Succeeded by Thomas Winnington
Preceded by The Earl of Wilmington	Prime Minister of Great Britain; 27 August 1743 – 6 March 1754	Succeeded by The Duke of Newcastle
Preceded by The Earl of Wilmington	First Lord of the Treasury; 1743–1754	Succeeded by The Duke of Newcastle
Preceded by Samuel Sandys	Chancellor of the Exchequer; 1743–1754	Succeeded by William Lee
Preceded by Samuel Sandys	Leader of the House of Commons; 1743–1754	Succeeded by Thomas Robinson
Parliament of Great Britain
Preceded by George Naylor; William Ashburnham	Member of Parliament for Seaford; 1717–1722; Served alongside: George Naylor	Succeeded by Sir William Gage, Bt; Sir Philip Yorke
Preceded by Spencer Compton; James Butler	Member of Parliament for Sussex; 1722–1754; With: Spencer Compton 1722–1728; James Butler 1728–1741; Earl of Middlesex 1742–1747; John Butler 1747–1754	Succeeded by John Butler; Thomas Pelham
