= East Carlton =

Village in Northamptonshire, England

Coordinates: 52.4972°N 0.7862°W

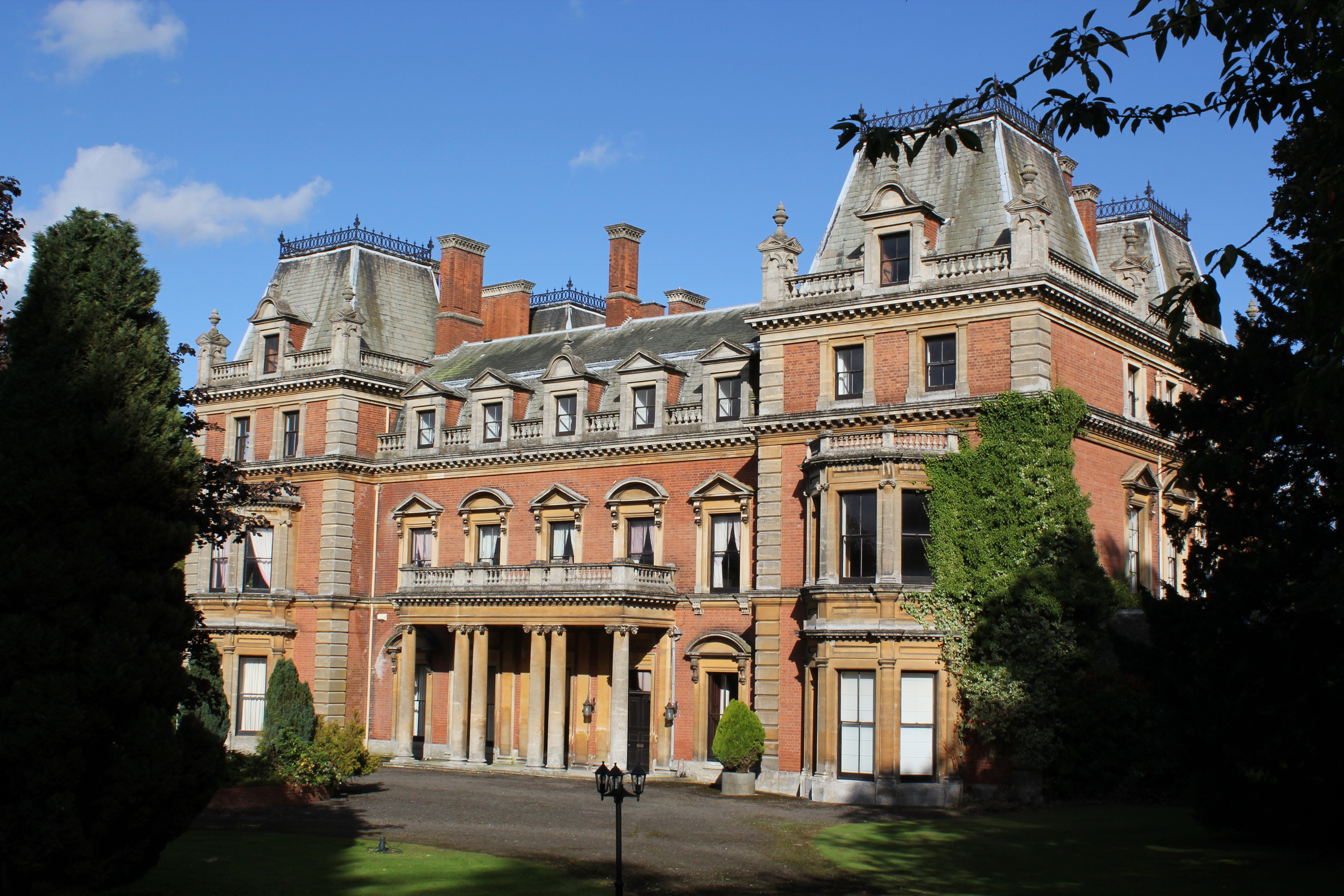
- East Carlton Hall

- Location within Northamptonshire
- Population: 259 (2011)
- OS grid reference: SP8289
- Unitary authority: North Northamptonshire
- Ceremonial county: Northamptonshire
- Region: East Midlands
- Country: England
- Sovereign state: United Kingdom
- Post town: Market Harborough
- Postcode district: LE16
- Dialling code: 01536
- Police: Northamptonshire
- Fire: Northamptonshire
- Ambulance: East Midlands
- UK Parliament: Kettering

East Carlton is a village and civil parish in the county of Northamptonshire, on the southern ridge overlooking the Welland valley to the north and covers 1,645 acres (666 ha) on a long strip of land. It is 2 miles (3.2 km) west of the town of Corby and is administered as part of North Northamptonshire but was previously in the Corby borough until 2021. At the time of the 2001 census, the parish's population was 270, reducing to 259 at the 2011 census. East Carlton is one of the Thankful Villages that suffered no fatalities during World War I.

== History ==
The village's name means 'Free peasants' farm/settlement'.

It is thought that Carlton was first occupied by the Danes. In the Domesday Book of 1087, the village of Carlton is referred to as Carlintone. A number of families owned land and estates throughout the centuries, including the Hotots, De Kirkeby and the Palmers. Until 1660, the settlement of Carlton was divided into two manors, East Hall and West Hall. East Hall is thought to have stood where the present hall stands. There is no trace of the West Hall, its stone may have been used as building material for later structures.

In 2018, the village is featured on Darren Hayman's album, Thankful Villages Volume 3.

== East Carlton Hall and grounds ==
In 1776/1778 Sir John Palmer, 5th Baronet, commissioned John Johnson, a Leicester architect to design a new hall. It was built on the foundations of the previous hall and was enlarged by Sir John Henry Palmer, 7th Baronet, in 1817, after which it was leased to a variety of notable tenants. It was further rebuilt in 1870 by the architect Edmund Francis Law, with red brick and ironstone in the style of a French château and replaced a Palladian house of 1778. It is said that the stone wall which surrounds the south and east of the parkland was the re-used stone of the old Hall.The hall is now referred to as East Carlton Hall, and is a Grade II listed building with extensive grounds overlooking the Welland Valley.

In the early 20th century large deposits of iron ore were found in the area. Stewarts & Lloyds Ltd, a steel manufacturers from Glasgow set up a steel works in Corby, at the time just a small village, and purchased the Hall and the park of 102 acres (41 ha) from Sir Geoffrey Palmer for £5,000. By 1936 the hall was converted into a hostel for unmarried bachelor staff. As the steel works expanded the directors began a house building programme to accommodate future employees. Part of the grounds of the hall were used to build housing for senior staff and 59 houses were built during 1934 and 1935, making up a large part of East Carlton as it is known today. The original village is situated west of the hall grounds.

Stewarts & Lloyds, together with other steel manufacturers were nationalised in the 1960s becoming British Steel Corporation. The steel industry was later rationalised leading to the end of steel manufacturing in Corby in 1979. The house and grounds were later acquired by Corby Borough Council. The house has now been sold as a family home and is not open to the public. The grounds have now become a country park open to the public.

== East Carlton Country Park ==
The park attracts over 400,000 visitors each year, according to Corby Borough Council, from the local area of Corby, Kettering, Market Harborough and further afield. The Country Park has a heritage centre which contains models and historical information about the Corby Steelworks. It has extensive parking, a play park and café.

== Other buildings ==
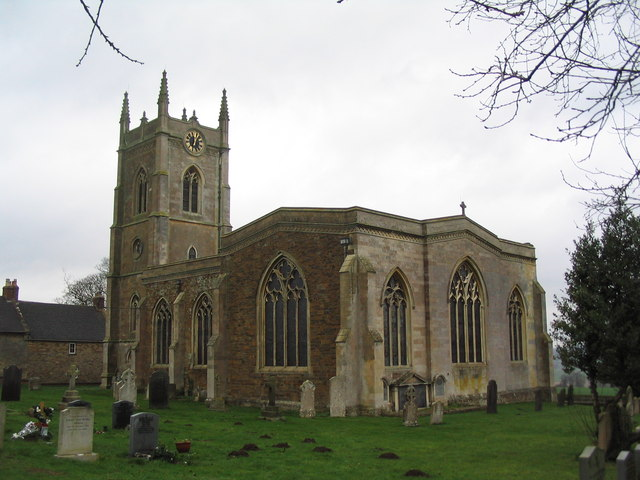
Church of St Peter, East Carlton

The church dedicated to St Peter dates from 1788 and is Grade I listed. There is a monument to Sir Geoffrey Palmer, 1st Baronet (d.1673) and his wife.

There is a terrace of almshouses north of the church rebuilt in the Tudor style in 1866. Both this and the Rectory (1873) are by architect Edmund Francis Law who also rebuilt the Hall in 1870.

== See also ==
- Palmer baronets, of Carlton (1660)
- Carlton Curlieu Hall, Leicestershire
