= Kirkby Mallory =

Village in Leicestershire, England

Coordinates: 52°36′N 1°19′W

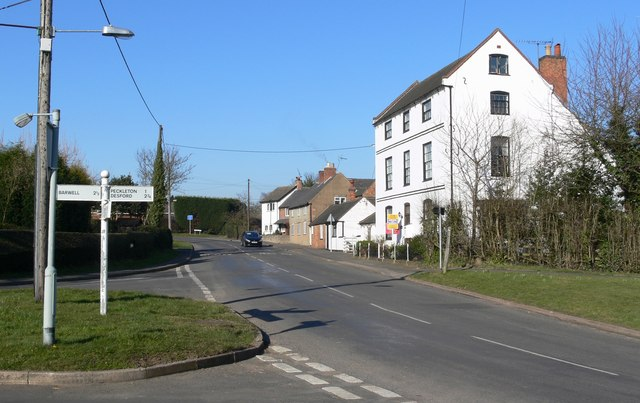
- Desford Lane

- Location within Leicestershire
- Civil parish: Kirkby Mallory, Peckleton and Stapleton
- District: Hinckley and Bosworth
- Shire county: Leicestershire
- Region: East Midlands
- Country: England
- Sovereign state: United Kingdom
- Post town: LEICESTER
- Postcode district: LE9

Kirkby Mallory is a village and former civil parish, now in the parish of Kirkby Mallory, Peckleton and Stapleton, in the Hinckley and Bosworth district of Leicestershire, England. In 1931 the parish had a population of 231.

It is known mainly for its race circuit, Mallory Park, a one-mile (1.6 km) track where car and motorbike races take place. Its church is All Saints and is located near the entrance. Numerous lakes and farms are situated in and around the village and the lakes are popular fishing areas.

There is a yearly firework display at the circuit which is well attended by residents and locals.

== History ==
Kirkby was named after the Mallory family, most prominently Sir Anketil Malory (1341–1393), a knight and governor of the castle and town of Leicester in the time of Richard II. In 1564, the population consisted of 25 families.

In 1675, Sir Thomas Neale (Noell, Noel, etc.) became 3rd Baronet of Kirkby Mallory and inherited Kirkby Manor from his father Baronet William Neale. In 1696, Thomas's brother, Sir John Neale (father of Clobery and William), left a rent roll listing the tenants and their rents and referring to Sir John's mansion house or hall with attached woods worth 3,000 pounds and "a large park, very well wooded, and stocked with deer".

According to Nichols, Kirkby was enclosed in 1771, the award listing 780 acres (3.2 km^{2}) and naming Edward Wentworth as Lord of the Manor. The parish was notable for its fine new hall, rebuilt in the 18th century by the Lord Viscount Wentworth but demolished in 1952.

Ada Byron (born 10 December 1815), daughter of Lord Byron and colleague of Charles Babbage, lived in the now demolished Kirkby Hall during her childhood with her mother, Annabella Milbanke.

On 1 April 1935 the parish was abolished and merged with Peckleton; part also went to Newbold Verdon.
