= Palmer baronets =

There have been seven baronetcies created for persons with the surname Palmer, two in the Baronetage of England, one each in the Baronetages of Ireland and of Great Britain and three in the Baronetage of the United Kingdom. As of 2021, four of the creations were extant.

- Palmer baronets of Wingham (1621)
- Palmer baronets of Carlton (1660)
- Palmer baronets of Castle Lackin (1777)
- Hudson (later Palmer) baronets of Wanlip Hall (1791)
- Palmer baronets of Grinkle Park and of Newcastle upon Tyne (1886)
- Palmer baronets of Reading (1904): see Sir Walter Palmer, 1st Baronet
- Palmer baronets of Grosvenor Crescent (1916): see Baron Palmer
