= List of Great Britain by-elections (1754–1774) =

This is a list of parliamentary by-elections in Great Britain held between 1754 and 1774, with the names of the previous incumbent and the victor in the by-election.

In the absence of a comprehensive and reliable source for party and factional alignments in this period, no attempt is made to define them in this article. The House of Commons: 1754–1790 provides some guidance on the complex and shifting political relationships, but it is significant that the compilers of that work make no attempt to produce a definitive list of each member's allegiances.

== Resignations ==
See Resignation from the British House of Commons for more details.

Where the cause of the by-election is given as "resignation", this indicates that the incumbent was appointed at his own request to an "office of profit under the Crown". Offices used in this period were the Stewards of the Chiltern Hundreds, the Manor of Old Shoreham, the Manor of East Hendred, the Manor of Kennington in Surrey (used once in 1757) and the Manor of Shippon in Berkshire (used once in 1765). These appointments are used as a constitutional device for leaving the House of Commons, whose Members are not permitted to resign. If the vacancy was caused by appointment to another office then this office is noted in brackets.

In addition certain offices of profit, such as cabinet positions, required the MP to seek re-election. These offices are noted separately.

== By-elections ==
The c/u column denotes whether the by-election was a contested poll or an unopposed return. If the winner was re-elected, at the next general election and any intermediate by-elections, this is indicated by an * following the c or u. In a few cases the winner was elected at the next general election but had not been re-elected in a by-election after the one noted. In those cases no * symbol is used.

=== 11th Parliament (1754–1761) ===
Date	Constituency	c/u	Former Incumbent	Winner	Cause
9 December 1754	Bury St Edmunds	u	Felton Hervey	Felton Hervey	Election voided due to Double Return
9 December 1754	Bury St Edmunds	u	Augustus John Hervey	Felton Hervey	Election voided due to Double Return
9 December 1754	Dartmouth	u*	John Jeffreys	John Jeffreys	Warden of the Mint
9 December 1754	Lostwithiel	u	Thomas Clarke	Thomas Clarke	Master of the Rolls
9 December 1754	Northampton	u	George Compton	Charles Compton	Succeeded to a peerage
9 December 1754	Petersfield	u	William Beckford	Sir John Philipps	Chose to sit for City of London
10 December 1754	Ludlow	u*	Richard Herbert	Edward Herbert	Death
10 December 1754	St Mawes	u	Robert Nugent	James Newsham	Chose to sit for Bristol
10 December 1754	Tavistock	u	Jeffrey French	Richard Vernon	Death
12 December 1754	Thetford	u	Charles FitzRoy Scudamore	Herbert Westfaling	Chose to sit for Hereford
13 December 1754	Totnes	u	Sir John Strange	Sir Richard Lloyd	Death
16 December 1754	Caernarvon Boroughs	u	William Wynn	Robert Wynne	Death
18 December 1754	Rutland	u	Lord Burghley	Lord Burghley	Succeeded to a peerage
20 December 1754	Boroughbridge	u	Lewis Watson	John Fuller	Chose to sit for Kent
20 December 1754	Edinburghshire	u	Robert Dundas	Robert Dundas	Lord Advocate
24 December 1754	Taunton	c*	John Halliday	Robert Maxwell	Death
25 December 1754	Hampshire	u	Lord Harry Powlett	Marquess of Winchester	Succeeded to a peerage
26 December 1754	Northamptonshire	u*	Valentine Knightley	William Cartwright	Death
30 December 1754	Wareham	u	Henry Drax	Henry Drax	Election voided due to Double Return
30 December 1754	Wareham	u	Thomas Erle Drax	Henry Drax	Election voided due to Double Return
30 December 1754	Wareham	u	William Augustus Pitt	William Augustus Pitt	Election voided due to Double Return
30 December 1754	Wareham	u	John Pitt	William Augustus Pitt	Election voided due to Double Return
1 January 1755	Elgin Burghs	u*	William Grant	Andrew Mitchell	Resignation (Lord of Justiciary)
13 January 1755	Cambridge	u*	Thomas Bromley	Charles Sloane Cadogan	Succeeded to a peerage
15 January 1755	Chichester	u	Viscount Bury	Augustus Keppel	Succeeded to a peerage
17 January 1755	Lymington	u	Marquess of Winchester	Lord Harry Powlett	Resignation to contest Hampshire
27 January 1755	Bishop's Castle	u	Barnaby Backwell	Walter Waring	Death
5 February 1755	Bewdley	u	William Henry Lyttelton	William Finch	Resignation (Governor of South Carolina)
6 February 1755	Cumberland	u	Sir James Lowther	Sir William Lowther	Death
11 March 1755	Radnorshire	u	Sir Humphrey Howorth	Howell Gwynne	Death
15 March 1755	Boroughbridge	u*	John Fuller	Sir Cecil Bishopp	Death
18 March 1755	Old Sarum	u	Thomas Pitt	Sir William Calvert	Resignation
19 April 1755	Dover	u	William Cayley	Peter Burrell	Resignation (Commissioner of Excise)
1 May 1755	Hertfordshire	u	Paggen Hale	William Plumer	Death
5 May 1755	Herefordshire	u*	Lord Harley	Sir John Morgan	Succeeded to a peerage
15 June 1755	Lichfield	c	Viscount Trentham	Henry Vernon	Succeeded to a peerage
19 November 1755	Reading	u*	William Strode	John Dodd	Death
19 November 1755	New Windsor	u*	Henry Fox	Henry Fox	Southern Secretary
20 November 1755	Brackley	u	Thomas Humberston	Sir William Moreton	Death
21 November 1755	Christchurch	u	Sir Thomas Robinson	Sir Thomas Robinson	Master of the Great Wardrobe
21 November 1755	Ludgershall	u	Sir John Bland	Henry Digby	Death
21 November 1755	Seaford	u*	William Hay	James Peachey	Death
22 November 1755	Hedon	u*	Charles Saunders	Charles Saunders	Comptroller of the Navy
22 November 1755	Tiverton	u	Sir William Yonge	Thomas Ryder	Death
24 November 1755	East Retford	u*	John Shelley	John Shelley	Keeper of the Records in the Tower of London
24 November 1755	Wareham	u	Henry Drax	Edward Drax	Death
25 November 1755	Plymouth	u*	The Viscount Barrington	The Viscount Barrington	Secretary at War
29 November 1755	Morpeth	u	Robert Ord	Sir Matthew Fetherstonhaugh	Resignation (Chief Baron of the Scottish Exchequer)
29 November 1755	Okehampton	u	Sir George Lyttelton	Sir George Lyttelton	Chancellor of the Exchequer
3 December 1755	Cardiganshire	u	John Lloyd	Wilmot Vaughan	Death
9 December 1755	Northampton	u	Charles Compton	Richard Backwell	Death
10 December 1755	Chester	u*	Sir Robert Grosvenor	Thomas Grosvenor	Death
19 December 1755	Dumfriesshire	u	Lord Charles Douglas	Sir James Veitch	Became the eldest son of a Scottish Peer
19 December 1755	Liverpool	u*	John Hardman	Ellis Cunliffe	Death
22 December 1755	Cambridge	u*	Viscount Dupplin	Viscount Dupplin	Paymaster of the Forces
27 December 1755	Cockermouth	u*	Percy Wyndham O'Brien	Percy Wyndham O'Brien	Junior Lord of the Treasury
27 December 1755	New Woodstock	u*	The Viscount Bateman	The Viscount Bateman	Lord of the Admiralty
29 December 1755	Gloucester	u*	George Augustus Selwyn	George Augustus Selwyn	Paymaster of the Works
29 December 1755	Higham Ferrers	u*	John Yorke	John Yorke	Patentee for Commissions of Bankruptcy
29 December 1755	Ilchester	u	John Talbot	John Talbot	Lord of Trade
29 December 1755	Norwich	u	Lord Hobart	Lord Hobart	Comptroller of the Household
29 December 1755	Warwick	u	The Earl of Hillsborough	The Earl of Hillsborough	Treasurer of the Chamber
30 December 1755	Penryn	u*	Richard Edgcumbe	Richard Edgcumbe	Lord of the Admiralty
30 December 1755	New Romney	u	Henry Furnese	Henry Furnese	Junior Lord of the Treasury
30 December 1755	Seaford	u*	The Viscount Gage	The Viscount Gage	Paymaster of Pensions
30 December 1755	Tavistock	u*	Richard Rigby	Richard Rigby	Lord of Trade
31 December 1755	Weymouth and Melcombe Regis	u	George Bubb Dodington	George Bubb Dodington	Treasurer of the Navy
31 December 1755	Weymouth and Melcombe Regis	u	Welbore Ellis	Welbore Ellis	Vice-Treasurer of Ireland
1 January 1756	Dunwich	u	Soame Jenyns	Soame Jenyns	Lord of Trade
19 January 1756	Hindon	u	Bisse Richards	William Mabbott	Death
19 February 1756	Berwickshire	u	Alexander Hume Campbell	Alexander Hume Campbell	Lord Clerk Register
4 March 1756	Appleby	u*	Philip Honywood	Philip Honywood	Void Election
4 March 1756	Appleby	u	William Lee	Fletcher Norton	Void Election
18 March 1756	Bristol	c*	Richard Beckford	Jarrit Smith	Death
19 March 1756	Liverpool	u	Thomas Salusbury	Charles Pole	Death
17 April 1756	Orford	u*	John Offley	John Offley	Surveyor of the King's Private Roads
23 April 1756	Evesham	c	John Porter	Edward Rudge	Death
28 April 1756	Cheshire	u*	Charles Cholmondeley	Thomas Cholmondeley	Death
29 April 1756	Petersfield	u	William Gerard Hamilton	William Gerard Hamilton	Lord of Trade
6 May 1756	Dover	u	Peter Burrell	Hugh Valence Jones	Death
19 May 1756	Cumberland	u	Sir William Lowther	Sir William Fleming	Death
1 June 1756	Newark-on-Trent	u*	John Manners	John Manners	Housekeeper at Whitehall
25 June 1756	Norwich	u*	Horatio Walpole	Edward Bacon	Elevated to the peerage
26 June 1756	Newport (Cornwall)	u*	Edward Bacon	Richard Bull	Resignation to contest Norwich
28 June 1756	Tamworth	u*	Thomas Villiers	Viscount Villiers	Elevated to the peerage
7 December 1756	Buckingham	u*	George Grenville	George Grenville	Treasurer of the Navy
7 December 1756	Buckingham	u	James Grenville	William Pitt	Junior Lord of the Treasury
7 December 1756	Sandwich	u*	Claudius Amyand	The Viscount Conyngham	Resignation (Commissioner of Customs)
8 December 1756	Bath	u	Sir Robert Henley	Sir Robert Henley	Attorney General for England and Wales
8 December 1756	Ilchester	u*	John Talbot	Joseph Tolson Lockyer	Death
8 December 1756	Norwich	u*	Lord Hobart	Harbord Harbord	Succeeded to a peerage
8 December 1756	New Romney	u	Henry Furnese	Rose Fuller	Death
8 December 1756	Reigate	u*	Charles Yorke	Charles Yorke	Solicitor General for England and Wales
8 December 1756	Stockbridge	u	George Hay	The Viscount Powerscourt	Appointed Lord of the Admiralty
8 December 1756	Winchelsea	u*	Thomas Orby Hunter	Thomas Orby Hunter	Lord of the Admiralty
8 December 1756	New Woodstock	u*	The Viscount Bateman	The Viscount Bateman	Treasurer of the Household
9 December 1756	Penryn	u	Richard Edgcumbe	Richard Edgcumbe	Comptroller of the Household
9 December 1756	Warwick	u	The Earl of Hillsborough	John Spencer	Became a British Peer
10 December 1756	Aylesbury	c	Thomas Potter	Thomas Potter	Paymaster of the Forces
10 December 1756	Boroughbridge	u	William Murray	Earl of Euston	Appointed Lord Chief Justice and elevated to the peerage
10 December 1756	Poole	u	Sir Richard Lyttelton	Sir Richard Lyttelton	Master of the Jewel Office
11 December 1756	Aldborough	u*	William Pitt	Nathaniel Cholmley	Southern Secretary
11 December 1756	Callington	u*	John Sharpe	Fane William Sharpe	Death
11 December 1756	Dorchester	u*	John Pitt	John Pitt	Lord of the Admiralty
11 December 1756	Okehampton	u	Sir George Lyttelton	William Pitt	Elevated to the peerage
11 December 1756	Orford	u*	Henry Bilson Legge	Henry Bilson Legge	Chancellor of the Exchequer
11 December 1756	Tiverton	u*	Thomas Ryder	Nathaniel Ryder	Resignation
13 December 1756	Great Bedwyn	u	William Sloper	Robert Brudenell	Resignation (Lord of Trade)
13 December 1756	Downton	u	James Cope	Edward Poore	Death
13 December 1756	Harwich	u	John Phillipson	Viscount Duncannon	Death
13 December 1756	Great Yarmouth	u*	Charles Townshend	Charles Townshend of Honingham	Treasurer of the Chamber
14 December 1756	Saltash	u	Viscount Duncannon	Charles Townshend	Junior Lord of the Treasury
21 December 1756	Bury St Edmunds	u	Viscount Petersham	Earl of Euston	Succeeded to a peerage
23 December 1756	Glamorganshire	c	Charles Edwin	Thomas William Mathews	Death
23 December 1756	Selkirkshire	u*	Gilbert Elliot	Gilbert Elliot	Lord of the Admiralty
24 December 1756	Sutherland	u	George Mackay	George Mackay	Master of the Mint in Scotland
4 January 1757	Staffordshire	u	William Leveson Gower	Henry Thynne	Death
14 January 1757	Buckingham	u*	William Pitt	James Grenville	Chose to sit for Okehampton
15 January 1757	Boroughbridge	u	Earl of Euston	Thomas Thoroton	Chose to sit for Bury St Edmunds
24 February 1757	King's Lynn	u*	Horatio Walpole	Horace Walpole	Succeeded to a peerage
25 February 1757	Castle Rising	u*	Horace Walpole	Charles Boone	Resignation to contest King's Lynn
8 March 1757	Whitchurch	u*	William Powlett	George Jennings	Death
28 March 1757	Rochester	u*	John Byng	Isaac Townsend	Death (Executed)
13 April 1757	Berkshire	u*	Peniston Powney	Arthur Vansittart	Death
13 April 1757	Weobley	u	Savage Mostyn	Savage Mostyn	Naval Lord
15 April 1757	Bossiney	u	Edwin Sandys	Edwin Sandys	Lord of the Admiralty
18 April 1757	St Mawes	u*	Henry Seymour Conway	Henry Seymour Conway	Groom of the Bedchamber
25 April 1757	Portsmouth	u	Sir William Rowley	Sir William Rowley	Naval Lord
27 April 1757	Cumberland	u*	Sir William Fleming	Sir James Lowther	Death
27 April 1757	Wilton	u*	William Herbert	Nicholas Herbert	Death
30 April 1757	Huntingdonshire	u*	The Lord Carysfort	The Lord Carysfort	Lord of the Admiralty
16 May 1757	West Looe	u*	William Noel	William Trelawny	Resignation (Puisne Justice of the Common Pleas)
19 May 1757	Launceston	u*	Humphry Morice	Humphry Morice	Second Clerk Comptroller of the Green Cloth
23 May 1757	Dartmouth	u*	Walter Carey	Richard Howe	Death
26 May 1757	Bury St Edmunds	u*	Earl of Euston	Augustus John Hervey	Succeeded to a peerage
13 June 1757	Lyme Regis	u*	Francis Fane	Henry Fane	Death
14 June 1757	Cambridge University	u*	Edward Finch	Edward Finch	Master of the Robes
4 July 1757	Kingston upon Hull	u*	Richard Crowle	Sir George Montgomery Metham	Death
5 July 1757	New Windsor	c	Henry Fox	Henry Fox	Paymaster of the Forces
6 July 1757	Aylesbury	u*	Thomas Potter	John Wilkes	Vice-Treasurer of Ireland
6 July 1757	Winchelsea	u	Thomas Orby Hunter	Thomas Orby Hunter	Lord of the Admiralty
7 July 1757	New Woodstock	u*	The Viscount Bateman	The Viscount Bateman	Master of the Buckhounds
9 July 1757	Bath	u*	Sir Robert Henley	William Pitt	Appointed Lord Keeper of the Great Seal
9 July 1757	Orford	u*	Henry Bilson Legge	Henry Bilson Legge	Chancellor of the Exchequer
9 July 1757	Orford	u*	John Offley	John Offley	Groom of the Bedchamber
12 July 1757	Calne	u	Thomas Duckett	George Hay	Resignation (Steward of the Manor of Kennington in Surrey)
12 July 1757	Cockermouth	u	The Earl of Thomond	The Earl of Thomond	Treasurer of the Household
13 July 1757	Downton	u*	James Hayes	Charles Pratt	Resignation
13 July 1757	Okehampton	u	William Pitt	Thomas Potter	Resignation to contest Bath
30 July 1757	Anstruther Burghs	u*	Sir Henry Erskine	Sir Henry Erskine	Surveyor of the King's Private Roads
6 December 1757	Maidstone	u	Lord Guernsey	Savile Finch	Succeeded to a peerage
6 December 1757	Southampton	u*	Hans Stanley	Hans Stanley	Lord of the Admiralty
7 December 1757	Ipswich	u*	Edward Vernon	Thomas Staunton	Death
7 December 1757	Weobley	u	Savage Mostyn	George Venables Vernon	Death
10 December 1757	Eye	u	Courthorpe Clayton	Courthorpe Clayton	Avener and Clerk Marshal
10 December 1757	Chipping Wycombe	u	John Waller	Edmund Waller	Death
14 December 1757	Richmond	u	John Yorke	Thomas Yorke	Death
15 December 1757	Wells	u	The Lord Digby	Robert Digby	Death
20 December 1757	Northumberland	u*	Sir William Middleton	George Shafto Delaval	Death
21 January 1758	Hindon	u	James Dawkins	James Calthorpe	Death
28 January 1758	Orford	u	Henry Bilson Legge	Henry Bilson Legge	Resignation upon becoming Surveyor of Petty Customs of the Port of London
31 January 1758	Cambridge	u	Viscount Dupplin	Viscount Dupplin	Chancellor of the Duchy of Lancaster
3 February 1758	East Retford	u*	John Shelley	John Shelley	Clerk of the Pipe
14 February 1758	Knaresborough	u	Richard Arundell	Robert Walsingham	Death
3 March 1758	Stirling Burghs	u	George Haldane	Robert Haldane	Resignation (Governor of Jamaica)
22 March 1758	County Durham	u	Viscount Barnard	Raby Vane	Succeeded to a peerage
25 April 1758	Eye	u	Nicholas Hardinge	Henry Townshend	Death
26 April 1758	Flintshire	u*	Sir Thomas Mostyn	Sir Roger Mostyn	Death
1 June 1758	Newport (I.o.W.)	u*	Ralph Jenison	Charles Holmes	Death
24 June 1758	Reigate	u*	Charles Cocks	Charles Cocks	Clerk of the Deliveries of the Ordnance
29 June 1758	Tiverton	u*	Henry Pelham	Sir Edward Hussey Montagu	Resignation (Commissioner of Customs)
29 November 1758	Cambridge	u	Viscount Dupplin	Soame Jenyns	Succeeded to a peerage
30 November 1758	City of London	u*	Slingsby Bethell	Sir Richard Glyn	Death
1 December 1758	Nottingham	u*	The Viscount Howe	William Howe	Death
1 December 1758	York	c	Sir John Armytage	William Thornton	Death
2 December 1758	Dunwich	u	Soame Jenyns	Alexander Forrester	Resignation to contest Cambridge
2 December 1758	Penryn	u	Richard Edgcumbe	John Plumptre	Succeeded to a peerage
8 December 1758	Wenlock	u	William Forester	George Forester	Death
13 December 1758	Bedfordshire	u	The Earl of Upper Ossory	Henry Osborn	Death
22 December 1758	Lancaster	u*	Edward Marton	George Warren	Death
27 December 1758	New Shoreham	u*	Richard Stratton	Sir William Peere Williams	Death
29 December 1758	Harwich	u	Viscount Duncannon	Thomas Sewell	Succeeded to a peerage
30 December 1758	Launceston	c	George Lee	Sir John St Aubyn	Death
30 December 1758	Launceston	c*	Sir John St Aubyn	Peter Burrell	By-election results reversed on petition 21 February 1759
3 January 1759	Yorkshire	u*	Sir Conyers Darcy	Sir George Savile	Death
26 January 1759	Winchelsea	u	Thomas Orby Hunter	George Gray	Resignation (Superintendent of Supplies to the Allied Armies in Germany)
10 February 1759	Steyning	u*	Hitch Younge	Frazer Honywood	Death
15 February 1759	Bishop's Castle	u	Walter Waring	Henry Grenville	Resignation
21 March 1759	Malmesbury	u*	Lord George Bentinck	Thomas Conolly	Death
20 April 1759	Suffolk	u*	Sir Cordell Firebrace	Rowland Holt	Death
8 May 1759	Essex	u*	Sir John Abdy	Sir William Maynard	Death
25 May 1759	Camelford	u*	Sir John Lade	Bartholomew Burton	Death
4 June 1759	Banbury	u*	Lord North	Lord North	Junior Lord of the Treasury
6 June 1759	Northampton	u	Charles Montagu	Frederick Montagu	Death
8 June 1759	Dover	u*	Hugh Valence Jones	Edward Simpson	Resignation (Irish Revenue Commissioner)
14 June 1759	Westmorland	u	John Dalston	Robert Lowther	Death
19 November 1759	Oxford	u*	Thomas Rowney	Sir Thomas Stapleton	Death
20 November 1759	Ipswich	u*	Samuel Kent	George Montgomerie	Death
21 November 1759	Montgomery	u*	William Bodvell	Richard Clive	Death
24 November 1759	Haslemere	u*	James More Molyneux	Thomas More Molyneux	Death
24 November 1759	Okehampton	u	Thomas Potter	George Brydges Rodney	Death
26 November 1759	Totnes	u*	Sir Richard Lloyd	Richard Savage Lloyd	Resignation (Baron of the Exchequer)
1 December 1759	Leominster	u*	Sir Charles Hanbury Williams	Chase Price	Death
1 December 1759	Liskeard	u*	Edmund Nugent	Philip Stephens	Resignation (Commission in the Army)
3 December 1759	Hampshire	u	Marquess of Winchester	Henry Bilson Legge	Succeeded to a peerage
10 December 1759	Old Sarum	u	Viscount Pulteney	Viscount Pulteney	Accepted a Commission in the Army
13 December 1759	Hertford	u	George Harrison	Viscount Fordwich	Death
20 December 1759	Orford	u*	Henry Bilson Legge	Charles FitzRoy	Surveyor of Petty Customs of the Port of London
26 December 1759	Bristol	u*	Robert Nugent	Robert Nugent	Vice-Treasurer of Ireland
1 January 1760	Tavistock	u*	Richard Rigby	Richard Rigby	Master of the Rolls in Ireland
2 January 1760	Norwich	u*	Edward Bacon	Edward Bacon	Lord of Trade
17 January 1760	Lanarkshire	c*	James Vere	Daniel Campbell	Death
18 January 1760	Dysart Burghs	u*	James Oswald	James Oswald	Junior Lord of the Treasury
25 January 1760	Eye	u*	Henry Townshend	Viscount Brome	Resignation
26 January 1760	Orford	u*	Charles FitzRoy	Charles FitzRoy	Groom of the Bedchamber
26 January 1760	Plymouth	u*	Samuel Dicker	George Pocock	Death
30 January 1760	St Germans	u*	Edward Eliot	Edward Eliot	Lord of Trade
29 March 1760	Southampton	u*	Anthony Langley Swymmer	Henry Dawkins	Death
31 March 1760	Guildford	u*	Richard Onslow	George Onslow	Death
5 April 1760	Winchelsea	u	George Gray	Thomas Orby Hunter	Resignation
2 June 1760	Chipping Wycombe	u*	The Earl of Shelburne	Viscount FitzMaurice	Became a British Peer
18 June 1760	Kent	u*	Lewis Watson	Sir Wyndham Knatchbull Wyndham	Elevated to the peerage
2 December 1760	Seaford	u*	James Peachey	James Peachey	Groom of the Bedchamber
4 December 1760	St Mawes	u	Henry Seymour Conway	Henry Seymour Conway	Groom of the Bedchamber
8 December 1760	Orford	u	Charles FitzRoy	Charles FitzRoy	Groom of the Bedchamber
8 December 1760	Orford	u*	John Offley	John Offley	Groom of the Bedchamber
9 December 1760	County Durham	c*	George Bowes	Robert Shafto	Death
1 January 1761	Berwickshire	u*	Alexander Hume Campbell	James Pringle	Death
12 January 1761	Edinburghshire	u*	Robert Dundas	Sir Alexander Gilmour	Resignation (Lord President of the Court of Session)
14 January 1761	Cambridge University	u*	Edward Finch	Edward Finch	Surveyor of the King's Private Roads

=== 12th Parliament (1761–1768) ===
Date	Constituency	c/u	Former Incumbent	Winner	Cause
4 December 1761	Bramber	u(*)	Andrew Archer	The Lord Winterton	Chose to sit for Coventry
4 December 1761	Eye	u	Henry Cornwallis	Henry Townshend	Death
4 December 1761	Ilchester	u	The Earl of Egmont	William Wilson	Chose to sit for Bridgwater
4 December 1761	New Shoreham	u	Sir William Peere Williams	The Lord Pollington	Death
4 December 1761	Winchelsea	u*	The Earl of Thomond	Thomas Sewell	Cofferer of the Household
5 December 1761	Gatton	u	Sir James Colebrooke	Edward Harvey	Death
5 December 1761	Harwich	u*	John Roberts	John Roberts	Lord of Trade
5 December 1761	Chipping Wycombe	u*	Viscount FitzMaurice	Isaac Barré	Succeeded to a peerage
7 December 1761	Durham City	c(*)	Henry Lambton	Ralph Gowland	Death
7 December 1761	Durham City	c(*)	Ralph Gowland	John Lambton	By-election results reversed on petition 11 May 1762
7 December 1761	Fowey	u	George Edgcumbe	Robert Walsingham	Succeeded to a peerage
7 December 1761	Minehead	u	The Earl of Thomond	The Earl of Thomond	Cofferer of the Household
7 December 1761	Newport	u*	John Lee	William de Grey	Death
8 December 1761	East Grinstead	u	Lord George Sackville	Sir Thomas Hales	Chose to sit for Hythe
8 December 1761	Plympton Erle	u	George Treby	George Hele Treby	Death
10 December 1761	Derbyshire	u*	Lord George Cavendish	Lord George Cavendish	Comptroller of the Household
10 December 1761	Dunbartonshire	u*	John Campbell	Archibald Edmonstone	Became a Scottish Peer
11 December 1761	Malton	u*	Henry Finch	Savile Finch	Death
17 December 1761	Old Sarum	u*	Thomas Pitt	Thomas Pitt	Death
18 December 1761	Clitheroe	u*	Thomas Lister	Nathaniel Lister	Death
28 December 1761	Ayr Burghs	u	Lord Frederick Campbell	Alexander Wedderburn	Chose to sit for Glasgow Burghs
28 December 1761	Cumberland	u	Sir James Lowther	Sir Wilfrid Lawson	Chose to sit for Westmorland
1 February 1762	Downton	u	Charles Pratt	Thomas Pym Hales	Resignation (Chief Justice of the Common Pleas)
1 February 1762	Reigate	u*	Charles Yorke	Charles Yorke	Attorney General for England and Wales
1 February 1762	Wigan	u*	Fletcher Norton	Sir Fletcher Norton	Solicitor General for England and Wales
19 February 1762	Wigtown Burghs	u	Archibald Montgomerie	Keith Stewart	Chose to sit for Ayrshire
24 February 1762	Hampshire	u*	Sir Simeon Stuart	Sir Simeon Stuart	Chamberlain of the Exchequer
27 February 1762	Edinburgh	u	George Lind	James Coutts	Resignation (Conservator of Scottish Privileges in the Netherlands)
18 March 1762	Wigtownshire	u	John Hamilton	James Murray	Resignation to contest Wigtown Burghs
20 March 1762	Rye	u*	Phillips Gybbon	John Norris	Death
24 March 1762	Taunton	u	The Earl of Tyrconnell	Laurence Sulivan	Death
25 March 1762	Leicestershire	u*	Edward Smith	Sir Thomas Cave	Death
7 April 1762	Newport (I.o.W.)	u	Charles Holmes	William Rawlinson Earle	Death
15 April 1762	Wigtown Burghs	u	Keith Stewart	John Hamilton	Resignation
27 April 1762	Westminster	u*	Edward Cornwallis	Edwin Sandys	Resignation (Governor of Gibraltar)
4 May 1762	Bramber	u	William Fitzherbert	George Venables Vernon	Resignation to contest Derby
5 May 1762	Bridgwater	u*	The Earl of Egmont	Viscount Perceval	Became a British Peer
5 May 1762	Derby	u*	George Venables Vernon	William Fitzherbert	Elevated to the peerage
7 May 1762	Dorchester	u*	The Lord Milton	John Damer	Became a British Peer
11 May 1762	Marlborough	u*	Lord Brudenell	James Long	Elevated to the peerage
14 May 1762	Tiverton	u	Sir Edward Hussey Montagu	Charles Gore	Elevated to the peerage
19 May 1762	Devon	u*	Sir William Courtenay	John Parker	Elevated to the peerage
24 May 1762	Bodmin	u	John Parker	Sir Christopher Treise	Resignation to contest Devon
28 May 1762	East Looe	u*	Francis Gashry	The Viscount Palmerston	Death
3 June 1762	Buteshire	u	James Stuart	Henry Wauchope	Death
5 June 1762	Huntingdonshire	u	Viscount Mandeville	Lord Charles Greville Montagu	Succeeded to a peerage
7 June 1762	Buckingham	u*	George Grenville	George Grenville	Northern Secretary
9 June 1762	King's Lynn	u*	Sir John Turner	Sir John Turner	Junior Lord of the Treasury
9 June 1762	Weymouth and Melcombe Regis	u	Sir Francis Dashwood	Sir Francis Dashwood	Chancellor of the Exchequer
11 June 1762	Plymouth	u*	The Viscount Barrington	The Viscount Barrington	Treasurer of the Navy
12 June 1762	Weobley	u	Marquess of Titchfield	William Lynch	Succeeded to a peerage
17 June 1762	Selkirkshire	u	Gilbert Elliot	Gilbert Elliot	Treasurer of the Chamber
30 June 1762	Cockermouth	u	Charles Jenkinson	Charles Jenkinson	Treasurer of the Ordnance
30 November 1762	Buckingham	u*	George Grenville	George Grenville	First Lord of the Admiralty
30 November 1762	Dunwich	u	Henry Fox	Henry Fox	Clerk of the Pells in Ireland
30 November 1762	East Grinstead	u*	Sir Thomas Hales	John Irwin	Death
1 December 1762	Eye	u	Henry Townshend	Richard Burton	Death
1 December 1762	Eye	u*	Viscount Brome	The Viscount Allen	Succeeded to a peerage
1 December 1762	Lyme Regis	u*	Thomas Fane	Lord Burghersh	Succeeded to a peerage
1 December 1762	Weymouth and Melcombe Regis	u	The Lord Waltham	Richard Jackson	Death
3 December 1762	Great Grimsby	u	Henry Knight	The Lord Luxborough	Death
6 December 1762	Corfe Castle	u	Henry Bankes	John Campbell	Resignation (Commissioner of Customs)
13 December 1762	Nottinghamshire	u*	Lord Robert Manners Sutton	Thomas Willoughby	Death
13 December 1762	Warwick	u	Viscount Dungarvan	Paul Methuen	Succeeded to a peerage
15 December 1762	Abingdon	u*	John Morton	John Morton	Chief Justice of Chester
16 December 1762	Oxford University	u	Peregrine Palmer	Sir Walter Wagstaffe Bagot	Death
21 December 1762	Lancashire	u*	Lord Strange	Lord Strange	Chancellor of the Duchy of Lancaster
22 December 1762	Aylesbury	u	Welbore Ellis	Welbore Ellis	Secretary at War
23 December 1762	Tavistock	u*	Richard Rigby	Richard Rigby	Vice-Treasurer of Ireland
27 December 1762	Bewdley	u(*)	Sir Edward Winnington	Sir Edward Winnington	Storekeeper of the Ordnance
27 December 1762	Cumberland	u*	Sir Wilfrid Lawson	Sir James Lowther	Death
27 December 1762	Ipswich	u	The Lord Orwell	The Lord Orwell	Lord of Trade
27 December 1762	Newcastle-under-Lyme	u	Henry Vernon	Sir Lawrence Dundas	Death
27 December 1762	Weobley	u*	Henry Frederick Thynne	Henry Frederick Thynne	Third Clerk Comptroller of the Green Cloth
28 December 1762	Christchurch	u*	James Harris	James Harris	Lord of the Admiralty
28 December 1762	Yarmouth	u*	Henry Holmes	Jeremiah Dyson	Death
29 December 1762	Calne	u*	Daniel Bull	Thomas FitzMaurice	Resignation (Commissioner of Taxes)
1 January 1763	Huntingdonshire	u	The Lord Carysfort	The Lord Carysfort	Lord of the Admiralty
3 January 1763	Launceston	u*	Humphry Morice	Humphry Morice	Comptroller of the Household
7 January 1763	Fifeshire	u	James St Clair	James Wemyss	Death
12 January 1763	Oxfordshire	u*	Lord Charles Spencer	Lord Charles Spencer	Out-Ranger of Windsor Forest and Surveyor of Gardens and Waters
3 February 1763	Knaresborough	u*	Sir Henry Slingsby	Sir Anthony Thomas Abdy	Death
21 February 1763	Lewes	u	Sir Francis Poole	William Plumer	Death
24 February 1763	Bury St Edmunds	u	Augustus John Hervey	William Hervey	Resignation
1 March 1763	Harwich	u*	Charles Townshend	Charles Townshend	First Lord of Trade
3 March 1763	Westmorland	u	Sir James Lowther	Robert Lowther	Resignation to contest Cumberland
15 March 1763	Westminster	u*	Viscount Pulteney	Lord Warkworth	Death
16 March 1763	Richmond	u	Earl of Ancram	Thomas Dundas	Resignation
7 April 1763	Totnes	u	Browse Trist	Henry Seymour	Resignation
21 April 1763	Yarmouth	u	The Lord Holmes	The Lord Holmes	Governor of the Isle of Wight
23 April 1763	Christchurch	u*	James Harris	James Harris	Junior Lord of the Treasury
23 April 1763	Wells	u	The Lord Digby	The Lord Digby	Lord of the Admiralty
23 April 1763	Winchelsea	u*	Thomas Orby Hunter	Thomas Orby Hunter	Junior Lord of the Treasury
25 April 1763	Buckingham	u*	George Grenville	George Grenville	First Lord of the Treasury and Chancellor of the Exchequer
26 April 1763	Maldon	c*	Bamber Gascoyne	John Huske	Lord of Trade
26 April 1763	Old Sarum	u	Thomas Pitt	Thomas Pitt	Lord of the Admiralty
27 April 1763	Gloucestershire	u*	Norborne Berkeley	Thomas Tracy	Resignation
27 April 1763	Pontefract	u	William Gerard Hamilton	William Gerard Hamilton	Chancellor of the Exchequer of Ireland
28 April 1763	Bath	c*	The Viscount Ligonier	Sir John Sebright	Resignation
28 April 1763	Dartmouth	u*	The Viscount Howe	The Viscount Howe	Naval Lord
28 April 1763	St Ives	u	Charles Hotham	Charles Hotham	Groom of the Bedchamber
29 April 1763	Dunwich	u	Henry Fox	Sir Jacob Garrard Downing	Elevated to the peerage
30 April 1763	Weymouth and Melcombe Regis	u	Sir Francis Dashwood	Charles Walcott	Succeeded to a peerage
4 May 1763	Oxfordshire	u*	Lord Charles Spencer	Lord Charles Spencer	Comptroller of the Household
6 May 1763	Kirkcudbright Stewartry	u	John Ross Mackye	John Ross Mackye	Treasurer of the Ordnance
11 May 1763	Glamorganshire	u	Sir Edmond Thomas	Sir Edmond Thomas	Surveyor-General of Woods North and South of Trent
12 May 1763	Ross-shire	u*	James Stuart Mackenzie	James Stuart Mackenzie	Keeper of the Privy Seal of Scotland
18 May 1763	Dysart Burghs	u	James Oswald	James Oswald	Vice-Treasurer of Ireland
21 November 1763	Bridgwater	u*	Edward Southwell	The Lord Coleraine	Resignation to contest Gloucestershire
21 November 1763	Northampton	u	Spencer Compton	Lucy Knightly	Succeeded to a peerage
22 November 1763	Honiton	c*	Henry Reginald Courtenay	Sir George Yonge	Death
22 November 1763	Horsham	u*	Charles Ingram	Robert Pratt	Became a Scottish Peer
22 November 1763	Milborne Port	u*	Thomas Medlycott	Thomas Hutchings Medlycott	Death
22 November 1763	Newcastle-under-Lyme	u	John Waldegrave	Thomas Gilbert	Succeeded to a peerage
22 November 1763	Tavistock	u*	Richard Neville Neville	Richard Neville Neville	Paymaster of Pensions
23 November 1763	Gloucestershire	u*	Thomas Chester	Edward Southwell	Death
24 November 1763	Bishop's Castle	c*	Francis Child	George Clive	Death
25 November 1763	Plympton Erle	u*	George Hele Treby	Paul Henry Ourry	Death
30 November 1763	Kent	u*	Sir Wyndham Knatchbull Wyndham	Sir Brook Bridges	Death
1 December 1763	Saltash	u	John Clevland	Augustus John Hervey	Death
5 December 1763	Brecon	u*	Thomas Morgan	Charles Morgan	Resignation to contest Monmouthshire
13 December 1763	Essex	c*	William Harvey	John Luther	Death
15 December 1763	Monmouthshire	u*	William Morgan	Thomas Morgan	Death
24 December 1763	West Looe	u	Francis Buller	Francis Buller	Groom Porter
24 December 1763	Wigan	c	Sir Fletcher Norton	Sir Fletcher Norton	Attorney General for England and Wales
27 December 1763	Newport (Cornwall)	u*	William de Grey	William de Grey	Solicitor General for England and Wales
29 December 1763	Stirlingshire	u	James Campbell	James Campbell	Governor of Stirling Castle
5 January 1764	Westmorland	u*	Robert Lowther	John Robinson	Resignation
17 January 1764	Argyllshire	u	Dugald Campbell	Lord William Campbell	Resignation (Master of the Revels in Scotland)
23 January 1764	Hereford	c*	John Symons	John Scudamore	Death
25 January 1764	Aylesbury	c*	John Wilkes	Welbore Anthony Bacon	Expulsion
9 February 1764	Steyning	u	Frazer Honywood	Richard Fuller	Death
18 February 1764	Dunwich	u*	Sir Jacob Garrard Downing	Miles Barne	Death
22 March 1764	Cambridgeshire	u*	Viscount Royston	Sir John Hynde Cotton	Succeeded to a peerage
23 March 1764	Perthshire	c*	John Murray	David Graeme	Became a Scottish Peer
23 March 1764	Rochester	u	Viscount Parker	Sir Charles Hardy	Succeeded to a peerage
2 April 1764	Corfe Castle	u*	Viscount Malpas	John Bond	Death
11 April 1764	Norfolk	u*	George Townshend	Thomas de Grey	Succeeded to a peerage
23 April 1764	Cambridge	u*	Charles Sloane Cadogan	Charles Sloane Cadogan	Surveyor of Gardens and Waters
24 April 1764	Bedford	u*	Richard Vernon	Richard Vernon	Third Clerk Comptroller of the Green Cloth
24 April 1764	Yarmouth	u	Jeremiah Dyson	Jeremiah Dyson	Lord of Trade
15 January 1765	Devizes	c*	John Garth	Charles Garth	Death
15 January 1765	Southampton	u*	Hans Stanley	Hans Stanley	Governor of the Isle of Wight
15 January 1765	Wallingford	u	John Hervey	Sir George Pigot	Death
15 January 1765	Winchelsea	u*	Sir Thomas Sewell	Sir Thomas Sewell	Master of the Rolls
16 January 1765	Midhurst	u	William Hamilton	Bamber Gascoyne	Resignation
17 January 1765	Brackley	u*	Robert Wood	Robert Wood	Groom Porter
18 January 1765	Berwick-upon-Tweed	u*	John Craufurd	Sir John Delaval	Death
18 January 1765	Wilton	u*	Nicholas Herbert	Nicholas Herbert	Secretary of Jamaica
18 January 1765	Yarmouth	u	The Lord Holmes	John Eames	Death
19 January 1765	Bossiney	u	John Richmond Webb	John Richmond Webb	Judge of the Brecon Circuit
19 January 1765	Dover	u	Edward Simpson	Marquess of Lorne	Death
19 January 1765	West Looe	c	Francis Buller	John Sargent	Death
21 January 1765	Fowey	c*	Jonathan Rashleigh	Philip Rashleigh	Death
21 January 1765	Stamford	u*	John Chaplin	George René Aufrère	Death
4 February 1765	Bridport	u	Sir Gerard Napier	Benjamin Way	Death
6 February 1765	Hampshire	u	Henry Bilson Legge	Sir Richard Mill	Death
6 February 1765	Salisbury	c	Julines Beckford	Samuel Eyre	Death
6 February 1765	Warwickshire	u	William Craven	William Throckmorton Bromley	Succeeded to a peerage
12 February 1765	Pembrokeshire	c*	Sir John Philipps	Sir Richard Philipps	Death
15 February 1765	Brackley	u*	Marshe Dickinson	Viscount Hinchingbrooke	Death
4 March 1765	Stafford	c	William Richard Chetwynd	John Crewe	Death
26 April 1765	Ilchester	c*	Joseph Tolson Lockyer	Peter Legh	Death
15 May 1765	Cornwall	u*	James Buller	Sir John Molesworth	Death
30 May 1765	Poole	c	Joseph Gulston	Joseph Gulston	Resignation
3 June 1765	Devizes	u*	William Willy	James Sutton	Death
3 June 1765	Harwich	u*	Charles Townshend	Charles Townshend	Paymaster of the Forces
5 June 1765	Anstruther Burghs	u	Sir Henry Erskine	Sir Henry Erskine	Secretary to the Order of the Thistle
7 June 1765	Kincardineshire	u	Sir James Carnegie	Sir Alexander Ramsay Irvine	Death
11 June 1765	St Germans	u	Philip Stanhope	William Hussey	Resignation
13 June 1765	Selkirkshire	u	Gilbert Elliot	John Pringle	Resignation to contest Roxburghshire
20 June 1765	Roxburghshire	u*	Walter Scott	Gilbert Elliot	Resignation (Receiver and Cashier of Excise in Scotland)
24 June 1765	Glasgow Burghs	u*	Lord Frederick Campbell	Lord Frederick Campbell	Keeper of the Privy Seal of Scotland
17 November 1765	Hythe	u	William Glanville	William Amherst	Death
23 December 1765	Dorchester	u*	Thomas Foster	William Ewer	Death
23 December 1765	Harwich	u*	John Roberts	John Roberts	Lord of Trade
23 December 1765	Leicester	u	James Wigley	Anthony James Keck	Death
23 December 1765	Reigate	u*	Charles Yorke	Charles Yorke	Attorney General for England and Wales
23 December 1765	Rochester	c	Isaac Townsend	Grey Cooper	Death
23 December 1765	Seaford	u*	The Viscount Gage	The Viscount Gage	Paymaster of Pensions
23 December 1765	New Shoreham	u*	The Viscount Midleton	Samuel Cornish	Death
23 December 1765	Southwark	u*	Alexander Hume	Henry Thrale	Death
23 December 1765	Tamworth	u*	Viscount Villiers	Edward Thurlow	Vice-Chamberlain of the Household
23 December 1765	Thetford	u*	Henry Seymour Conway	Henry Seymour Conway	Southern Secretary
23 December 1765	Wendover	u*	Verney Lovett	Edmund Burke	Resignation
23 December 1765	Whitchurch	u*	Thomas Townshend	Thomas Townshend	Junior Lord of the Treasury
23 December 1765	New Windsor	u*	Augustus Keppel	Augustus Keppel	Naval Lord
23 December 1765	Great Yarmouth	u*	Charles Townshend	Charles Townshend	Lord of the Admiralty
24 December 1765	Berwick-upon-Tweed	u	Thomas Watson	Wilmot Vaughan	Resignation (Steward of the Manor of Shippon, Berkshire)
24 December 1765	Winchester	u*	Lord Harry Powlett	George Paulet	Succeeded to a peerage
26 December 1765	Dartmouth	u*	The Viscount Howe	The Viscount Howe	Treasurer of the Navy
26 December 1765	Derby	u*	William Fitzherbert	William Fitzherbert	Lord of Trade
26 December 1765	Hedon	u*	Sir Charles Saunders	Sir Charles Saunders	Naval Lord
26 December 1765	Hythe	u	Lord George Sackville	Lord George Sackville	Vice-Treasurer of Ireland
26 December 1765	Leicestershire	u*	Sir Thomas Palmer	Sir John Palmer	Death
26 December 1765	Liverpool	u*	Sir William Meredith	Sir William Meredith	Lord of the Admiralty
26 December 1765	Newport (I.o.W.)	u	Thomas Lee Dummer	Thomas Dummer	Death
26 December 1765	Plymouth	u*	The Viscount Barrington	The Viscount Barrington	Secretary at War
26 December 1765	Pontefract	u*	The Viscount Galway	The Viscount Galway	Master of the Staghounds
26 December 1765	Stamford	u*	George Bridges Brudenell	George Bridges Brudenell	Second Clerk Comptroller of the Green Cloth
26 December 1765	Sussex	u*	Thomas Pelham	Thomas Pelham	Comptroller of the Household
26 December 1765	Thirsk	u	Henry Grenville	James Grenville	Resignation (Commissioner of Customs)
26 December 1765	Wells	c(*)	The Lord Digby	Robert Child	Became a British Peer (Two Returns Made)
26 December 1765	Wells	c(*)	The Lord Digby	Peter Taylor	Became a British Peer (Two Returns Made)
26 December 1765	Wells	c(*)	Robert Child	Robert Child	Child Declared elected 15 January 1766
26 December 1765	Wells	c(*)	Peter Taylor	Robert Child	Child Declared elected 15 January 1766
27 December 1765	Aldborough	u(*)	Andrew Wilkinson	Viscount Villiers	Resignation (Storekeeper of the Ordnance)
27 December 1765	East Looe	u*	The Viscount Palmerston	The Viscount Palmerston	Lord of Trade
27 December 1765	East Looe	u*	John Buller	John Buller	Lord of the Admiralty
27 December 1765	Guildford	u*	George Onslow	George Onslow	Out-Ranger of Windsor Forest
28 December 1765	Higham Ferrers	u	John Yorke	John Yorke	Lord of Trade
28 December 1765	Huntingdonshire	u	Lord Charles Greville Montagu	Robert Bernard	Resignation (Governor of South Carolina)
30 December 1765	East Grinstead	u	Earl of Middlesex	Sir Charles Farnaby	Succeeded to a peerage
30 December 1765	Knaresborough	u*	Sir Anthony Thomas Abdy	Sir Anthony Thomas Abdy	King's Counsel
30 December 1765	Knaresborough	u	Lord John Cavendish	Lord John Cavendish	Junior Lord of the Treasury
2 January 1766	Cardiff Boroughs	u*	Herbert Mackworth	Herbert Mackworth	Death
2 January 1766	Edinburghshire	u*	Sir Alexander Gilmour	Sir Alexander Gilmour	Third Clerk Comptroller of the Green Cloth
8 January 1766	Surrey	u*	George Onslow	George Onslow	Junior Lord of the Treasury
8 January 1766	Worcestershire	u*	William Dowdeswell	William Dowdeswell	Chancellor of the Exchequer
9 January 1766	Monmouthshire	u*	Capel Hanbury	John Hanbury	Death
17 January 1766	Anstruther Burghs	c*	Sir Henry Erskine	Sir John Anstruther	Death
17 January 1766	Perth Burghs	u	George Dempster	George Dempster	Secretary to the Order of the Thistle
24 January 1766	Bossiney	u*	John Richmond Webb	Lord Mount Stuart	Death
27 January 1766	Leicester	u	George Wrighte	John Darker	Death
4 February 1766	Helston	u	Francis Godolphin	William Windham	Succeeded to a peerage
7 February 1766	Dartmouth	u*	John Jeffreys	Richard Hopkins	Death
15 March 1766	Kingston upon Hull	u*	Sir George Montgomery Metham	William Weddell	Resignation (Clerk of the Wardrobe)
1 April 1766	Bridgnorth	u*	William Whitmore	William Whitmore	Warden of the Mint
2 April 1766	Berkshire	u*	Henry Pye	Thomas Craven	Death
4 April 1766	Lostwithiel	u	George Howard	Viscount Beauchamp	Resignation (Governor of Minorca)
22 April 1766	Calne	u	Thomas Duckett	John Calcraft	Death
8 May 1766	Shropshire	u*	Richard Lyster	Charles Baldwyn	Death
28 May 1766	Dumfries Burghs	u	Thomas Miller	James Montgomery	Resignation (Lord Justice Clerk)
16 June 1766	Great Bedwyn	u	William Woodley	William Burke	Resignation pending appointment as Governor of the Leeward Islands
17 November 1766	Banbury	u*	Lord North	Lord North	Joint Paymaster of the Forces
17 November 1766	Coventry	u*	James Hewitt	Henry Seymour Conway	Resignation (Puisne Justice of the King's Bench)
17 November 1766	Harwich	u	Charles Townshend	Charles Townshend	Chancellor of the Exchequer
17 November 1766	Honiton	u*	Sir George Yonge	Sir George Yonge	Lord of the Admiralty
18 November 1766	Buckingham	u	James Grenville	James Grenville	Vice-Treasurer of Ireland
18 November 1766	Christchurch	u*	Thomas Robinson	Thomas Robinson	Lord of Trade
18 November 1766	Newport (Cornwall)	u*	William de Grey	William de Grey	Attorney General for England and Wales
18 November 1766	Chipping Wycombe	u*	Isaac Barré	Isaac Barré	Vice-Treasurer of Ireland
19 November 1766	Barnstaple	u*	Sir George Amyand	John Clevland	Death
19 November 1766	Bath	c*	William Pitt	John Smith	Elevation to the peerage
19 November 1766	Penryn	u*	Sir Edward Turner	Francis Basset	Death
19 November 1766	Scarborough	u*	William Osbaldeston	Fountayne Wentworth Osbaldeston	Death
20 November 1766	East Looe	u	The Viscount Palmerston	The Viscount Palmerston	Lord of the Admiralty
25 November 1766	East Retford	u	John Shelley	John Shelley	Treasurer of the Household
27 November 1766	Middlesex	u*	George Cooke	George Cooke	Joint Paymaster of the Forces
4 December 1766	Nairnshire	u	Pryse Campbell	Pryse Campbell	Junior Lord of the Treasury
5 December 1766	Ross-shire	u*	James Stuart Mackenzie	James Stuart Mackenzie	Keeper of the Privy Seal of Scotland
9 December 1766	Queenborough	u*	Sir Peircy Brett	Sir Peircy Brett	Naval Lord
10 December 1766	Portsmouth	u*	Sir Edward Hawke	Sir Edward Hawke	First Lord of the Admiralty
12 December 1766	Argyllshire	u*	Lord William Campbell	Robert Campbell	Resignation (Governor of Nova Scotia)
15 December 1766	Southampton	u*	Hans Stanley	Hans Stanley	Cofferer of the Household
16 December 1766	Bristol	u*	Robert Nugent	Robert Nugent	First Lord of Trade
22 December 1766	Boston	u*	John Michell	Charles Amcotts	Death
23 December 1766	Dover	u	Marquess of Lorne	John Bindley	Elevated to the peerage
23 December 1766	Lewes	u	Thomas Sergison	Lord Edward Bentinck	Death
9 January 1767	Aberdeen Burghs	u	David Scott	Sir John Lindsay	Death
9 January 1767	Cockermouth	u	Charles Jenkinson	John Elliot	Lord of the Admiralty
20 January 1767	Appleby	u*	John Stanwix	Charles Jenkinson	Death
26 January 1767	Chichester	u*	Lord George Henry Lennox	William Keppel	Resignation to contest Sussex
28 January 1767	Somerset	u	Thomas Prowse	Sir Thomas Dyke Acland	Death
3 February 1767	Sussex	u*	John Butler	Lord George Henry Lennox	Death
4 February 1767	Tregony	u*	William Trevanion	Thomas Pownall	Death
5 February 1767	Roxburghshire	u*	Sir Gilbert Elliot	Gilbert Elliot	Keeper of the Signet
12 February 1767	Steyning	u*	John Thomlinson	Sir John Filmer	Death
11 March 1767	Preston	u*	Nicholas Fazakerley	Sir Peter Leicester	Death
21 March 1767	Leominster	c	Chase Price	Edward Willes	Resignation
24 March 1767	Wiltshire	u*	Sir Robert Long	Thomas Goddard	Death
7 April 1767	Bedfordshire	u*	Marquess of Tavistock	The Earl of Upper Ossory	Death
18 May 1767	Herefordshire	u*	Sir John Morgan	Thomas Foley	Death
8 June 1767	Boroughbridge	u	Brice Fisher	James West	Death
8 June 1767	New Woodstock	u*	Anthony Keck	William Gordon	Death
16 June 1767	Truro	u*	John Boscawen	Edward Hugh Boscawen	Death
1 July 1767	Helston	u*	Sir John Evelyn	William Evelyn	Death
10 July 1767	West Looe	u*	Sir William Trelawny	James Townsend	Resignation (Governor of Jamaica)
30 November 1767	Banbury	u*	Lord North	Lord North	Chancellor of the Exchequer
30 November 1767	Harwich	u	Charles Townshend	Thomas Bradshaw	Death
1 December 1767	Dartmouth	u*	Richard Hopkins	Richard Hopkins	Third Clerk Comptroller of the Green Cloth
2 December 1767	Great Bedwyn	u	Thomas Cotes	Sir Thomas Fludyer	Death
3 December 1767	Monmouth	u*	Benjamin Bathurst	John Stepney	Death
4 December 1767	Amersham	u	Benet Garrard	John Affleck	Death
4 December 1767	Appleby	u*	Charles Jenkinson	Charles Jenkinson	Junior Lord of the Treasury
4 December 1767	Liverpool	u*	Sir Ellis Cunliffe	Richard Pennant	Death
4 December 1767	Whitchurch	u*	Thomas Townshend	Thomas Townshend	Joint Paymaster of the Forces
7 December 1767	Ashburton	u	John Harris	Robert Palk	Death
16 December 1767	Glamorganshire	u	Sir Edmond Thomas	Richard Turbervill	Death
17 December 1767	Petersfield	u	Richard Pennant	Richard Croftes	Resignation to contest Liverpool
19 December 1767	Exeter	u	John Tuckfield	William Spicer	Death
31 December 1767	Peeblesshire	u	John Dickson	Adam Hay	Death
28 January 1768	Tavistock	u*	Richard Rigby	Richard Rigby	Vice-Treasurer of Ireland
29 January 1768	Chippenham	u*	Sir Samuel Fludyer	Sir Thomas Fludyer	Death
6 February 1768	Leominster	u*	Edward Willes	John Carnac	Resignation (Puisne justice of the King's Bench)
3 February 1768	Oxford University	u	Sir Walter Wagstaffe Bagot	Sir William Dolben	Death
22 February 1768	Tiverton	u	Charles Gore	John Duntze	Death

=== 13th Parliament (1768–1774) ===
Date	Constituency	c/u	Former Incumbent	Winner	Cause
18 May 1768	New Windsor	u	Lord George Beauclerk	Richard Tonson	Death
20 May 1768	Great Bedwyn	u	Robert Brudenell	William Burke	Chose to sit for Marlborough
20 May 1768	Warwick	u	Henry Archer	Paul Methuen	Death
24 May 1768	Cockermouth	u*	Charles Jenkinson	George Johnstone	Chose to sit for Appleby
27 May 1768	Droitwich	u	Thomas Foley	Edward Foley	Chose to sit for Herefordshire
27 June 1768	Bristol	u	The Viscount Clare	The Viscount Clare	Vice-Treasurer of Ireland
2 July 1768	Ludgershall	u*	Viscount Garlies	Viscount Garlies	Commissioner of Police for Scotland
5 July 1768	Staffordshire	u*	Lord Grey	John Wrottesley	Succeeded to a peerage
11 July 1768	Tavistock	u*	Richard Rigby	Richard Rigby	Paymaster of the Forces
13 November 1768	Great Bedwyn	u*	James Brudenell	William Northey	Resignation to contest Marlborough
16 November 1768	Wareham	u	Ralph Burton	Whitshed Keene	Death
16 November 1768	Newcastle-under-Lyme	u*	John Wrottesley	George Hay	Resignation to contest Staffordshire
17 November 1768	Marlborough	u*	Robert Brudenell	James Brudenell	Death
21 November 1768	Richmond	u	Sir Lawrence Dundas	William Norton	Chose to sit for Edinburgh
29 November 1768	Peterborough	u	Sir Matthew Lamb	Viscount Belasyse	Death
30 November 1768	Tamworth	u	William de Grey	Charles Vernon	Chose to sit for Newport (Cornwall)
1 December 1768	Coventry	u	Andrew Archer	Sir Richard Glyn	Succeeded to a peerage
5 December 1768	Pontefract	c	The Viscount Galway	The Viscount Galway	Void Election
5 December 1768	Pontefract	c	Sir Rowland Winn	Henry Strachey	Void Election
9 December 1768	Sussex	u	Thomas Pelham	Richard Harcourt	Succeeded to a peerage
10 December 1768	Glasgow Burghs	u*	Lord Frederick Campbell	Lord Frederick Campbell	Lord Clerk Register
14 December 1768	St Germans	u*	Edward Eliot	Benjamin Langlois	Chose to sit for Liskeard
14 December 1768	St Germans	u	Samuel Salt	George Jennings	Chose to sit for Liskeard
14 December 1768	Middlesex	c*	George Cooke	John Glynn	Death
23 December 1768	Wigtown Burghs	u	George Augustus Selwyn	Chauncy Townsend	Chose to sit for Gloucester
28 December 1768	Weymouth and Melcombe Regis	u*	Jeremiah Dyson	Jeremiah Dyson	Junior Lord of the Treasury
29 December 1768	Linlithgow Burghs	u	John Lockhart Ross	James Dickson	Chose to sit for Lanarkshire
4 January 1769	Cardiganshire	u*	The Viscount Lisburne	The Viscount Lisburne	Lord of Trade
13 January 1769	Cardigan Boroughs	c	Pryse Campbell	Ralph Congreve	Death
8 February 1769	Guildford	u*	Sir Fletcher Norton	Sir Fletcher Norton	Justice in Eyre, South of the Trent
15 February 1769	Kent	u	John Frederick Sackville	Sir Charles Farnaby	Succeeded to a peerage
16 February 1769	Middlesex	u*	John Wilkes	John Wilkes	Expulsion
18 February 1769	Poole	u*	Joshua Mauger	Joshua Mauger	Void Election
23 February 1769	Lymington	u	Adam Drummond	Hugo Meynell	Chose to sit for St Ives
16 March 1769	Middlesex	u	John Wilkes	John Wilkes	Expulsion (Declared Incapable of being re-elected)
22 March 1769	Cockermouth	u	Sir George Macartney	Sir James Lowther	Resignation following appointment as Chief Secretary for Ireland
27 March 1769	Chippenham	u	Sir Thomas Fludyer	Henry Dawkins	Death
29 March 1769	Warwickshire	u*	William Throckmorton Bromley	Thomas Skipwith	Death
3 April 1769	Bletchingley	u*	Sir Kenrick Clayton	Frederick Standert	Death
4 April 1769	Perth Burghs	u	William Pulteney	George Dempster	Chose to sit for Cromartyshire
13 April 1769	Middlesex	c*	John Wilkes	John Wilkes	Expulsion (Declared Incapable of being re-elected)
13 April 1769	Middlesex	c	John Wilkes	Henry Lawes Luttrell	Luttrell declared elected 15 April 1769
24 April 1769	Bossiney	u*	Henry Lawes Luttrell	Sir George Osborn	Resignation to contest Middlesex
8 May 1769	Totnes	u	Peter Burrell	Peter Burrell	Surveyor General of the Land Revenues of the Crown
15 May 1769	Brecon	u	Charles Morgan	John Morgan	Resignation to contest Breconshire
15 May 1769	Cambridge	u*	Charles Sloane Cadogan	Charles Sloane Cadogan	Master of the Mint
17 May 1769	Breconshire	u*	Thomas Morgan	Charles Morgan	Death
26 May 1769	Richmond	u	Alexander Wedderburn	Charles John Crowle	Resignation
9 June 1769	Stirling Burghs	u	James Masterton	James Masterton	Barrack Master General for Scotland
15 January 1770	Hertford	c*	William Cowper	Paul Feilde	Death
15 January 1770	Winchelsea	u*	Thomas Orby Hunter	Arnold Nesbitt	Death
16 January 1770	Bishop's Castle	u*	William Clive	Alexander Wedderburn	Resignation
17 January 1770	Penryn	u*	Francis Basset	William Lemon	Death
17 January 1770	St Mawes	u	Edmund Nugent	Michael Byrne	Resignation
20 January 1770	Dover	c	Viscount Villiers	Sir Thomas Pym Hales	Succeeded to a peerage
31 January 1770	Lichfield	u*	Thomas Anson	George Adams	Resignation
1 February 1770	Cambridge University	u	Charles Yorke	William de Grey	Resignation (Lord Chancellor)
2 February 1770	Grantham	u	Sir John Cust	Francis Cust	Death
8 February 1770	Petersfield	u	Welbore Ellis	Welbore Ellis	Vice-Treasurer of Ireland
10 February 1770	Great Yarmouth	u*	Charles Townshend	Charles Townshend	Junior Lord of the Treasury
12 February 1770	Newport (Cornwall)	u	William de Grey	Richard Henry Alexander Bennet	Resignation to contest Cambridge University
21 February 1770	Westbury	u	Sir William Blackstone	Charles Dillon	Resignation (Puisne Justice of the King's Bench)
26 February 1770	Midhurst	u*	Charles James Fox	Charles James Fox	Lord of the Admiralty
27 February 1770	Plymouth	u	Francis Holburne	Francis Holburne	Naval Lord
1 March 1770	Christchurch	u	Thomas Robinson	Thomas Robinson	Vice-Chamberlain of the Household
5 March 1770	New Romney	u	Sir Edward Dering	John Morton	Resignation to provide a seat for Morton
7 March 1770	Cardiganshire	u*	The Viscount Lisburne	The Viscount Lisburne	Lord of the Admiralty
20 March 1770	Pembrokeshire	u*	Sir Richard Philipps	Hugh Owen	Void Election
22 March 1770	Roxburghshire	u*	Sir Gilbert Elliot	Sir Gilbert Elliot	Treasurer of the Navy
4 April 1770	Tamworth	u	Edward Thurlow	Edward Thurlow	Solicitor General for England and Wales
12 April 1770	Anglesey	u	Owen Meyrick	Sir Nicholas Bayly	Death
12 April 1770	Stafford	u	The Viscount Chetwynd	William Neville Hart	Death
14 April 1770	Eye	u*	The Viscount Allen	Richard Phillipson	Resignation
17 April 1770	Great Bedwyn	u	William Northey	William Northey	Lord of Trade
18 April 1770	Horsham	u*	James Grenville	James Wallace	Resignation
20 April 1770	Warwick	u	Lord Greville	Lord Greville	Lord of Trade
23 April 1770	Carmarthenshire	u*	George Rice	George Rice	Treasurer of the Chamber
30 April 1770	Westminster	u	Edwin Sandys	Sir Robert Bernard	Succeeded to a peerage
30 April 1770	New Woodstock	u	Lord Robert Spencer	Lord Robert Spencer	Lord of Trade
7 May 1770	Wigtown Burghs	u	Chauncy Townsend	William Stewart	Death
21 May 1770	Southampton	u*	Hans Stanley	Hans Stanley	Governor of the Isle of Wight
23 May 1770	Bossiney	u	Sir George Osborn	Sir George Osborn	Groom of the Bedchamber
25 May 1770	Midhurst	u	Lord Stavordale	Lord Stavordale	Resignation
25 May 1770	Milborne Port	u	Thomas Hutchings Medlycott	The Earl of Catherlough	Resignation
11 July 1770	City of London	u*	William Beckford	Richard Oliver	Death
11 July 1770	Scarborough	c	Fountayne Wentworth Osbaldeston	Sir James Pennyman	Death (Two MPs elected due to a Double Return)
11 July 1770	Scarborough	c	Fountayne Wentworth Osbaldeston	Ralph Bell	Death (Two MPs elected due to a Double Return)
11 July 1770	Scarborough	c	Sir James Pennyman	Sir James Pennyman	Pennyman Declared Elected 27 November 1770
11 July 1770	Scarborough	c	Ralph Bell	Sir James Pennyman	Pennyman Declared Elected 27 November 1770
6 August 1770	Gloucestershire	u*	Thomas Tracy	Sir William Guise	Death
6 September 1770	Wendover	u*	Sir Robert Darling	Joseph Bullock	Death
2 October 1770	Wiltshire	u*	Thomas Goddard	Charles Penruddocke	Death
20 October 1770	Okehampton	u	Thomas Brand	Richard FitzPatrick	Death
31 October 1770	East Looe	u	Richard Hussey	Richard Leigh	Death
3 November 1770	Ludlow	u	Edward Herbert	Thomas Herbert	Death
20 November 1770	Christchurch	u	Thomas Robinson	James Harris	Succeeded to a peerage
22 November 1770	Cambridgeshire	u*	Marquess of Granby	Sir Sampson Gideon	Death
26 November 1770	Buckingham	u*	George Grenville	James Grenville	Death
26 November 1770	New Shoreham	c	Sir Samuel Cornish	John Purling	Death
26 November 1770	New Shoreham	c	John Purling	Thomas Rumbold	By-election results reversed 17 December 1770
26 December 1770	Weobley	u*	Henry Frederick Thynne	Bamber Gascoyne	Resignation (Joint-Postmaster General)
29 January 1771	Bere Alston	u	Sir Francis Henry Drake	Francis William Drake	Resignation (Master of the Household)
29 January 1771	Great Bedwyn	u	William Northey	Benjamin Hopkins	Death
29 January 1771	Bury St Edmunds	u*	Augustus John Hervey	Augustus John Hervey	Naval Lord
30 January 1771	New Woodstock	u*	Lord Robert Spencer	John Skynner	Resignation to contest Oxford
31 January 1771	Orkney and Shetland	u*	Thomas Dundas	Thomas Dundas	Resignation (Commissioner of Police for Scotland)
31 January 1771	Oxford	u*	George Nares	Lord Robert Spencer	Resignation (Puisne Justice of the Common Pleas)
1 February 1771	Bishop's Castle	u	Alexander Wedderburn	Alexander Wedderburn	Solicitor General for England and Wales
1 February 1771	Tamworth	u	Edward Thurlow	Edward Thurlow	Attorney General for England and Wales
2 February 1771	Castle Rising	u*	Thomas Whately	Thomas Whately	Lord of Trade
4 February 1771	Cambridge University	c*	William de Grey	Richard Croftes	Resignation (Chief Justice of the Common Pleas)
11 February 1771	Downton	u	Richard Croftes	James Hayes	Resignation to contest Cambridge University
16 February 1771	Huntingdonshire	u*	Viscount Hinchingbrooke	Viscount Hinchingbrooke	Vice-Chamberlain of the Household
27 February 1771	Haddington Burghs	c	Patrick Warrender	Patrick Warrender	King's Remembrancer in Scotland
9 March 1771	Rochester	u	William Gordon	Thomas Pye	Resignation
20 March 1771	Elgin Burghs	u	Sir Andrew Mitchell	Thomas Lockhart	Death
11 May 1771	Wootton Bassett	u*	Henry St John	Henry St John	Groom of the Bedchamber
13 May 1771	Arundel	u	Lauchlin Macleane	John Stewart	Resignation
13 May 1771	Shaftesbury	c*	Ralph Payne	Francis Sykes	Resignation (Governor of the Leeward Islands)
15 May 1771	Orford	u*	Edward Colman	Robert Seymour Conway	Resignation (Gentlemen Usher of the Privy Chamber)
15 May 1771	Salisbury	u*	Edward Bouverie	Viscount Folkestone	Resignation
8 June 1771	Castle Rising	u	Jenison Shafto	Crisp Molineux	Death
15 June 1771	Montgomery	u	Richard Clive	Frederick Cornewall	Death
18 July 1771	Monmouthshire	c*	Thomas Morgan	John Morgan	Death
23 July 1771	Lancashire	u	Lord Strange	The Viscount Molyneux	Death
10 August 1771	Plymouth	u*	Francis Holburne	Sir Charles Hardy	Death
20 September 1771	Bridgnorth	u*	William Whitmore	Thomas Whitmore	Death
4 October 1771	Brackley	u*	Robert Wood	Timothy Caswall	Death
22 November 1771	Callington	c*	Fane William Sharpe	William Skrine	Death
13 December 1771	Northampton	u*	Thomas Howe	Wilbraham Tollemache	Death
18 December 1771	Suffolk	u*	Sir John Rous	Rowland Holt	Death
9 January 1772	Linlithgow Burghs	u*	James Dickson	Sir James Cockburn	Death
27 January 1772	Lyme Regis	u*	Lord Burghersh	Henry Fane	Succeeded to a peerage
27 January 1772	Wallingford	c*	Robert Pigot	John Cator	Warden of the Mint
31 January 1772	Brecon	u*	John Morgan	Charles Van	Resignation to contest Monmouthshire
31 January 1772	Derby	c*	William Fitzherbert	Wenman Coke	Death
3 February 1772	Castle Rising	u	Thomas Whately	Thomas Whately	Surveyor of the King's Private Roads
4 February 1772	Lancashire	u*	Lord Archibald Hamilton	Sir Thomas Egerton	Resignation
5 February 1772	Hampshire	u*	Lord Henley	Sir Henry St John	Succeeded to a peerage
12 February 1772	Weobley	u	Bamber Gascoyne	Bamber Gascoyne	Lord of Trade
15 February 1772	Petersfield	u*	William Jolliffe	William Jolliffe	Lord of Trade
20 February 1772	Argyllshire	u*	Robert Campbell	Adam Livingston	Resignation (Receiver and Cashier of Customs in Scotland)
25 February 1772	Essex	u*	Sir William Maynard	John Conyers	Death
28 February 1772	Dysart Burghs	u	James Townsend Oswald	James Townsend Oswald	Secretary for the Leeward Islands
5 March 1772	Shropshire	u	Sir John Astley	Sir Watkin Williams Wynn	Death
9 March 1772	Montgomeryshire	u	Edward Kynaston	Watkin Williams	Death
7 April 1772	Milborne Port	c	The Earl of Catherlough	Richard Combe	Death
7 April 1772	Milborne Port	c	Richard Combe	George Prescott	By-election results reversed on petition 22 May 1772
9 April 1772	East Looe	u	Richard Leigh	John Purling	Death
10 April 1772	New Woodstock	u*	John Skynner	John Skynner	Puisne Justice of Chester
5 May 1772	Stockbridge	u	Richard Worge	James Hare	Death
9 May 1772	Saltash	c(*)	Thomas Bradshaw	John Williams	Lord of the Admiralty
9 May 1772	Saltash	c(*)	John Williams	Thomas Bradshaw	By-election results reversed on petition 8 June 1772
18 May 1772	Aldborough	u	Andrew Wilkinson	Earl of Lincoln	Resignation
22 May 1772	Beverley	c	Hugh Bethell	Sir Griffith Boynton	Death
10 June 1772	Castle Rising	u	Thomas Whately	Lord Guernsey	Death
15 June 1772	Lyme Regis	u*	Henry Fane	Henry Fane	Surveyor of the King's Private Roads
27 July 1772	Boroughbridge	u	James West	Henry Clinton	Death
28 July 1772	Scarborough	u*	George Manners	The Earl of Tyrconnel	Death
7 August 1772	Harwich	u*	John Roberts	Charles Jenkinson	Death
21 August 1772	Wiltshire	c*	Edward Popham	Ambrose Goddard	Death
18 September 1772	Rochester	c*	John Calcraft	George Finch Hatton	Death
9 November 1772	New Windsor	u*	Richard Tonson	John Hussey Montagu	Death
4 December 1772	Reigate	u	Sir Charles Cocks	Sir Charles Cocks	Clerk of the Ordnance
4 December 1772	St Mawes	u	Michael Byrne	James Edward Colleton	Death
5 December 1772	Ludgershall	u	Viscount Garlies	Viscount Garlies	Lord of Trade
5 December 1772	St Germans	u*	Benjamin Langlois	Benjamin Langlois	Clerk of the Deliveries of the Ordnance
7 December 1772	Wilton	u*	Henry Herbert	Henry Herbert	Resignation to contest Wiltshire
11 December 1772	Pontefract	u	The Viscount Galway	The Viscount Galway	Death
16 December 1772	Cornwall	c	Sir John St Aubyn	Humphrey Mackworth Praed	Death
28 December 1772	Harwich	u	Charles Jenkinson	Charles Jenkinson	Vice-Treasurer of Ireland
28 December 1772	Penryn	u	William Lemon	William Lemon	Resignation to contest Cornwall
30 December 1772	Berkshire	u*	Edward Kynaston	John Elwes	Death
1 January 1773	Appleby	u	Charles Jenkinson	Fletcher Norton	Resignation to contest Harwich
1 January 1773	Midhurst	u	Charles James Fox	Charles James Fox	Junior Lord of the Treasury
14 January 1773	Northamptonshire	u*	Sir Edmund Isham	Lucy Knightley	Death
25 January 1773	Coventry	u*	Sir Richard Glyn	Walter Waring	Death
2 April 1773	Dover	c	Sir Thomas Pym Hales	Thomas Barret	Death
14 April 1773	Newport (I.o.W.)	u	John Eames	John St John	Resignation (Commissioner of Taxes)
16 April 1773	Clitheroe	u*	Nathaniel Lister	Thomas Lister	Resignation
26 April 1773	Tain Burghs	u*	Alexander Mackay	James Grant	Resignation
13 May 1773	Aldeburgh	u*	Nicholas Linwood	Thomas Fonnereau	Death
11 June 1773	Perthshire	c*	David Graeme	James Murray	Resignation
15 September 1773	Lancaster	u*	Francis Reynolds	Lord Richard Cavendish	Death
25 November 1773	Worcester	c	Henry Crabb Boulton	Thomas Bates Rous	Death (Election Voided 8 February 1774)
15 December 1773	Maldon	c	John Huske	Charles Rainsford	Death
23 December 1773	City of London	c*	Sir Robert Ladbroke	Frederick Bull	Death
20 January 1774	Newcastle-under-Lyme	u*	Sir George Hay	Sir George Hay	Judge of the High Court of the Admiralty
21 January 1774	Warwick	u*	Lord Greville	Charles Francis Greville	Succeeded to a peerage
22 January 1774	Ludgershall	u	Viscount Garlies	Whitshed Keene	Became a Scottish Peer
28 January 1774	Wareham	u	Whitshed Keene	Thomas de Grey	Lord of Trade
16 February 1774	Peterborough	u*	Viscount Belasyse	Richard Benyon	Succeeded to a peerage
24 February 1774	Merioneth	u*	John Pugh Pryse	Evan Lloyd Vaughan	Death
28 February 1774	Huntingdon	u*	Robert Jones	William Augustus Montagu	Death
1 March 1774	Worcester	c	Thomas Bates Rous	Nicholas Lechmere	Void Election
14 March 1774	Weymouth and Melcombe Regis	u	Jeremiah Dyson	Jeremiah Dyson	Cofferer of the Household
15 March 1774	Orford	u*	Viscount Beauchamp	Viscount Beauchamp	Junior Lord of the Treasury
19 March 1774	Liverpool	u*	Sir William Meredith	Sir William Meredith	Comptroller of the Household
21 March 1774	Grampound	u	Charles Wolfran Cornwall	Charles Wolfran Cornwall	Junior Lord of the Treasury
22 March 1774	Eye	u	William Cornwallis	Marquess of Carmarthen	Resignation
28 March 1774	Pontefract	u	The Viscount Galway	Robert Monckton	Death
29 March 1774	Portsmouth	c*	Sir Matthew Fetherstonhaugh	Peter Taylor	Death
7 April 1774	Droitwich	u*	Robert Harley	Andrew Foley	Death
11 May 1774	Haslemere	u*	William Burrell	Sir Merrick Burrell	Resignation (Commissioner of Excise)
31 May 1774	Worcestershire	u*	John Ward	Edward Foley	Succeeded to a peerage
31 May 1774	Droitwich	u	Edward Foley	Rowland Berkeley	Resignation to contest Worcestershire
13 August 1774	Winchelsea	u*	The Earl of Thomond	William Nedham	Death
6 September 1774	Thetford	u	John Drummond	Viscount Petersham	Death
