= List of MPs elected in the 1761 British general election =

1761–1768 Parliament of the Great Britain
←	1754–1761 Parliament	1768–1774 Parliament	→

Overview
- Legislative body: Parliament of Great Britain
- Jurisdiction: Great Britain
- Meeting place: Palace of Westminster
- Term: 3 November 1761 – 11 March 1768
- Election: 1761 British general election
- Government: Pitt–Newcastle ministry (until 26 May 1762); Bute ministry (26 May 1762–8 April 1763); Grenville ministry (16 April 1763–13 July 1765); First Rockingham ministry (13 July 1765–30 July 1766); Chatham ministry (from 30 July 1766)

House of Commons
- Members: 558
- Speaker: Sir John Cust, 3rd Baronet
- Leader: George Grenville (until May 1762; 16 April 1763–13 July 1765); Henry Fox (May 1762–April 1763); Henry Seymour Conway (July 1765–20 October 1768)

House of Lords
- Lord Chancellor: Earl of Northington (until 30 July 1766); Earl Camden (from 30 July 1766)
- Leader: Duke of Newcastle (until 26 May 1762); Earl of Egremont (May 1762–21 August 1763); Earl of Halifax (August 1763–July 1765; Marquess of Rockingham (13 July 1765–30 July 1766); Duke of Grafton (from 1766))

Crown-in-Parliament George III

Sessions
- 1st: 19 May 1761 –
- 2nd: 3 November 1761 – 2 June 1762
- 3rd: 25 November 1762 – 19 April 1763
- 4th: 15 November 1763 – 19 April 1764
- 5th: 10 January 1765 – 25 May 1765
- 6th: 17 December 1765 – 6 June 1766
- 7th: 11 November 1766 – 2 June 1767
- 8th: 24 November 1767 – 10 March 1768

List of MPs elected in the 1761 British general election

This is a list of the 558 MPs or members of Parliament elected to the 314 constituencies of the Parliament of Great Britain in 1761, the 12th Parliament of Great Britain and their replacements returned at subsequent by-elections, arranged by constituency.

Table of contents:

A B C D E F G H I J K L M N O P Q R S T U V W X Y Z By-elections Changes

== A ==
Aberdeen Burghs (seat 1/1)	David Scott – died Replaced by Sir John Lindsay 1767	Administration ?
Aberdeenshire (seat 1/1)	Lord Adam Gordon	Administration
Abingdon (seat 1/1)	John Morton	Tory
Aldborough (seat 1/2)	Nathaniel Cholmley	Administration
Aldborough (seat 2/2)	Andrew Wilkinson – took office Replaced by Viscount Villiers 1765	Administration
Aldeburgh (seat 1/2)	Philip Fonnereau	
Aldeburgh (seat 2/2)	Zachary Philip Fonnereau	Administration
Amersham (seat 1/2)	Benet Garrard – died Replaced by John Affleck 1767	
Amersham (seat 2/2)	William Drake, Sr	Tory
Andover (seat 1/2)	Francis Blake Delaval	Opposition Whig
Andover (seat 2/2)	John Griffin Whitwell	Administration
Anglesey (seat 1/1)	Owen Meyrick	Whig
Anstruther Easter Burghs (seat 1/1)	Sir Henry Erskine, Bt – died Replaced by Sir John Anstruther 1766	Administration
Appleby (seat 1/2)	John Stanwix – died Replaced by Charles Jenkinson 1767	
Appleby (seat 2/2)	Philip Honywood	Administration
Argyllshire (seat 1/1)	Dugald Campbell – took office Replaced by Lord William Campbell 1764 – took office Replaced by Robert Campbell 1766	
Arundel (seat 1/2)	George Colebrooke	Opposition Whig
Arundel (seat 2/2)	John Bristow	
Ashburton (seat 1/2)	John Harris of Hayne – died Replaced by Robert Palk 1767	
Ashburton (seat 2/2)	Hon. Thomas Walpole	
Aylesbury (seat 1/2)	John Wilkes – expelled Replaced by Anthony Bacon 1764	
Aylesbury (seat 2/2)	Welbore Ellis	
Ayr Burghs (seat 1/1)	Lord Frederick Campbell – sat for Glasgow Burghs; Replaced by Alexander Wedderburn 1761	
Ayrshire (seat 1/1)	Archibald Montgomerie	Whig
== B ==
Banbury (seat 1/1)	Lord North	Administration
Banffshire (seat 1/1)	Hon. James Duff	Whig (doubtful)
Barnstaple (seat 1/2)	Denys Rolle	
Barnstaple (seat 2/2)	Sir George Amyand – died Replaced by John Clevland 1766	Whig; Whig
Bath (seat 1/2)	Sir John Ligonier – resigned Replaced by Sir John Sebright 1763	v
Bath (seat 2/2)	William Pitt – ennobled Replaced by John Smith 1766	
Beaumaris (seat 1/1)	Richard Thelwall Price	Tory
Bedford (seat 1/2)	Francis Herne	
Bedford (seat 2/2)	Richard Vernon	Whig
Bedfordshire (seat 1/2)	Marquess of Tavistock – died Replaced by The 1st Earl of Upper Ossory 1767	Whig
Bedfordshire (seat 2/2)	Robert Henley-Ongley	Tory
Bedwyn	see Great Bedwyn	...
Bere Alston (seat 1/2)	Sir Francis Henry Drake	Administration
Bere Alston (seat 2/2)	Hon. George Hobart	
Berkshire (seat 1/2)	Arthur Vansittart	
Berkshire (seat 2/2)	Henry Pye – died Replaced by Thomas Craven 1766	Tory.
Berwickshire (seat 1/1)	James Pringle	
Berwick-upon-Tweed (seat 1/2)	Thomas Watson – resigned Replaced by Wilmot Vaughan 1765	
Berwick-upon-Tweed (seat 2/2)	John Craufurd – died Replaced by John Delaval 1765	. Opposition Whig
Beverley (seat 1/2)	Michael Newton	
Beverley (seat 2/2)	George Tufnell	
Bewdley (seat 1/1)	Sir Edward Winnington	
Bishops Castle (seat 1/2)	Francis Child – died Replaced by George Clive 1763	
Bishops Castle (seat 2/2)	Peregrine Cust	
Bletchingley (seat 1/2)	Sir Kenrick Clayton, Bt	Administration
Bletchingley (seat 2/2)	(Sir) Charles Whitworth	
Bodmin (seat 1/2)	John Parker – resigned to contest Devon; Replaced by Sir Christopher Treise 1762	
Bodmin (seat 2/2)	George Hunt	Administration
Boroughbridge (seat 1/2)	Sir Cecil Bishopp	
Boroughbridge (seat 2/2)	Brice Fisher – died Replaced by James West 1767	
Bossiney (seat 1/2)	John Richmond Webb – died Replaced by Lord Mount Stuart 1766	
Bossiney (seat 2/2)	Edward Wortley Montagu	Opposition Whig
Boston (seat 1/2)	Lord Robert Bertie	Administration
Boston (seat 2/2)	John Michell – died Replaced by Charles Amcotts 1766	Tory
Brackley (seat 1/2)	Marshe Dickinson – died Replaced by Viscount Hinchingbrooke 1765	Tory.
Brackley (seat 2/2)	Robert Wood	
Bramber (seat 1/2)	Andrew Archer – sat for Coventry; Replaced by The Lord Winterton 1761	
Bramber (seat 2/2)	William Fitzherbert – resigned to contest Derby; Replaced by George Venables Vernon 1762	
Brecon (seat 1/1)	Thomas Morgan, Jr – resigned to contest Monmouthshire; Replaced by Charles Morgan 1763	n
Breconshire (seat 1/1)	Thomas Morgan	Administration
Bridgnorth (seat 1/2)	John Grey	Administration
Bridgnorth (seat 2/2)	William Whitmore	Administration
Bridgwater (seat 1/2)	The 2nd Earl of Egmont – ennobled Replaced by Viscount Perceval 1762	
Bridgwater (seat 2/2)	Edward Southwell – resigned to contest Gloucestershire; Replaced by The Lord Coleraine 1763	Administration
Bridport (seat 1/2)	Sir Gerard Napier – died Replaced by Benjamin Way 1765	Tory
Bridport (seat 2/2)	Thomas Coventry	Administration
Bristol (seat 1/2)	Robert Nugent	Administration
Bristol (seat 2/2)	Jarrit Smith	
Buckingham (seat 1/2)	James Grenville	Administration
Buckingham (seat 2/2)	George Grenville	Administration
Buckinghamshire (seat 1/2)	Sir William Stanhope	
Buckinghamshire (seat 2/2)	Richard Lowndes	Tory
Bury St Edmunds (seat 1/2)	Hon. Charles Fitzroy	
Bury St Edmunds (seat 2/2)	Augustus John Hervey – resigned Replaced by William Hervey 1763	
Buteshire (seat 1/1)	James Stuart – died Replaced by Henry Wauchope 1762	...
== C ==
Caernarvon Boroughs (seat 1/1)	Sir John Wynn, Bt	
Caernarvonshire (seat 1/1)	Sir Thomas Wynn, 3rd Baronet	
Caithness (seat 0/0)	Alternating seat with Bute-shire. No representation in 1761	
Callington (seat 1/2)	Richard Stevens	
Callington (seat 2/2)	Fane William Sharpe	
Calne (seat 1/2)	Thomas Duckett – died Replaced by John Calcraft 1766	Tory
Calne (seat 2/2)	Daniel Bull – took office Replaced by Thomas FitzMaurice 1762	
Cambridge (seat 1/2)	Soame Jenyns	
Cambridge (seat 2/2)	Charles Sloane Cadogan	
Cambridgeshire (seat 1/2)	Marquess of Granby	
Cambridgeshire (seat 2/2)	Viscount Royston; Sir John Hynde Cotton, Bt 1764	Administration
Cambridge University (seat 1/2)	Edward Finch	
Cambridge University (seat 2/2)	Thomas Townshend	
Camelford (seat 1/2)	Samuel Martin	
Camelford (seat 2/2)	Bartholomew Burton	
Canterbury (seat 1/2)	Richard Milles	
Canterbury (seat 2/2)	Thomas Best	
Cardiff Boroughs (seat 1/1)	Herbert Mackworth, Sr – died Replaced by Herbert Mackworth 1766	
Cardigan Boroughs (seat 1/1)	Sir Herbert Lloyd, 1st Baronet	
Cardiganshire (seat 1/1)	John Pugh Pryse	
Carlisle (seat 1/2)	Raby Vane	
Carlisle (seat 2/2)	Henry Curwen	
Carmarthen (seat 1/1)	The Earl Verney	
Carmarthenshire (seat 1/1)	George Rice	
Castle Rising (seat 1/2)	Charles Boone	
Castle Rising (seat 2/2)	Hon. Thomas Howard	
Cheshire (seat 1/2)	Thomas Cholmondeley	
Cheshire (seat 2/2)	Samuel Egerton	
Chester (seat 1/2)	Richard Wilbraham-Bootle	
Chester (seat 2/2)	Thomas Grosvenor	
Chichester (seat 1/2)	Lord George Henry Lennox – resigned to contest Sussex; Replaced by William Keppel 1767	
Chichester (seat 2/2)	John Page	
Chippenham (seat 1/2)	Edward Bayntun-Rolt	
Chippenham (seat 2/2)	Samuel Fludyer – died Replaced by Sir Thomas Fludyer 1768	
Chipping Wycombe (seat 1/2)	Viscount FitzMaurice – succeeded to peerage Replaced by Isaac Barré 1761	
Chipping Wycombe (seat 2/2)	Robert Waller	
Christchurch (seat 1/2)	Sir Thomas Robinson	
Christchurch (seat 2/2)	James Harris	
Cirencester (seat 1/2)	James Whitshed	Tory
Cirencester (seat 2/2)	John Dawnay	Tory
City of Durham	see Durham (City of)	...
City of London	see London (City of)	...
Clackmannanshire (seat 1/1)	James Abercromby	
Clitheroe (seat 1/2)	Thomas Lister – died Replaced by Nathaniel Lister 1761	
Clitheroe (seat 2/2)	Assheton Curzon	
Clyde Burghs	see Glasgow Burghs	...
Cockermouth (seat 1/2)	Sir John Mordaunt	
Cockermouth (seat 2/2)	Charles Jenkinson – took office Replaced by John Elliot 1767	
Colchester (seat 1/2)	Charles Gray	Tory
Colchester (seat 2/2)	Isaac Martin Rebow	Whig
Corfe Castle (seat 1/2)	Viscount Malpas – died Replaced by John Bond 1764	
Corfe Castle (seat 2/2)	Henry Bankes – took office Replaced by John Campbell 1762	
Cornwall (seat 1/2)	James Buller – died Replaced by Sir John Molesworth 1765	
Cornwall (seat 2/2)	Sir John St Aubyn, Bt	
County Durham	see Durham (County)	...
Coventry (seat 1/2)	James Hewitt – took office Replaced by Henry Seymour Conway 1766	
Coventry (seat 2/2)	Hon. Andrew Archer	
Cricklade (seat 1/2)	Arnold Nesbitt	
Cricklade (seat 2/2)	Thomas Gore	
Cromartyshire (seat 0/0)	Alternating seat with Nairnshire – unrepresented in this Parliament	
Cumberland (seat 1/2)	Sir James Lowther – sat for Westmorland; Replaced by Sir Wilfrid Lawson 1761 – died Replaced by Sir James Lowther 1762	
Cumberland (seat 2/2)	Sir John Pennington, Bt	
== D ==
Dartmouth (seat 1/2)	John Jeffreys – died Replaced by Richard Hopkins 1766	
Dartmouth (seat 2/2)	Richard Howe	
Denbigh Boroughs (seat 1/1)	Richard Myddelton	
Denbighshire (seat 1/1)	Sir Lynch Salusbury Cotton	
Derby (seat 1/2)	Lord Frederick Cavendish	Administration
Derby (seat 2/2)	George Venables-Vernon – ennobled Replaced by William Fitzherbert 1762	
Derbyshire (seat 1/2)	Lord George Cavendish	
Derbyshire (seat 2/2)	Sir Henry Harpur, 6th Bt.	Tory
Devizes (seat 1/2)	William Willy – died Replaced by James Sutton 1765	
Devizes (seat 2/2)	John Garth – died Replaced by Charles Garth 1765	
Devon (seat 1/2)	Sir William Courtenay – ennobled Replaced by John Parker 1762	
Devon (seat 2/2)	Sir Richard Warwick Bampfylde	
Dorchester (seat 1/2)	The 1st Baron Milton – ennobled Replaced by John Damer 1762	
Dorchester (seat 2/2)	Thomas Foster – died Replaced by William Ewer 1765	
Dorset (seat 1/2)	Humphry Sturt	
Dorset (seat 2/2)	George Pitt	Tory
Dover (seat 1/2)	Hon. Sir Joseph Yorke	
Dover (seat 2/2)	Edward Simpson – died Replaced by Marquess of Lorne 1765 – ennobled Replaced by John Bindley 1766	
Downton (seat 1/2)	Charles Pratt – took office Replaced by Thomas Pym Hales 1762	
Downton (seat 2/2)	James Hayes	
Droitwich (seat 1/2)	Thomas Foley	
Droitwich (seat 2/2)	Robert Harley	
Dumfries Burghs (seat 1/1)	Thomas Miller – took office Replaced by James Montgomery 1766	
Dumfriesshire (seat 1/1)	Lt Gen Archibald Douglas	
Dunbartonshire (seat 1/1)	John Campbell – ennobled Replaced by Archibald Edmonstone 1761	Tory
Dunwich (seat 1/2)	Henry Fox – ennobled Replaced by Sir Jacob Garrard Downing, Bt 1763- died Replaced by Miles Barne 1764	
Dunwich (seat 2/2)	Eliab Harvey	
Durham (City of) (seat 1/2)	John Tempest	
Durham (City of) (seat 2/2)	Henry Lambton – died Replaced by Ralph Gowland 1761- election reversed on petition Replaced by John Lambton 1762	
Durham (County) (seat 1/2)	Robert Shafto	
Durham (County) (seat 2/2)	Hon. Frederick Vane	
Dysart Burghs (seat 1/1)	James Oswald	
== E ==
East Grinstead (seat 1/2)	Earl of Middlesex – succeeded to peerage Replaced by Sir Charles Farnaby 1765	
East Grinstead (seat 2/2)	Lord George Sackville – sat for Hythe; Replaced by Sir Thomas Hales 1761 – died Replaced by John Irwin 1762	
East Looe (seat 1/2)	Francis Gashry – died Replaced by The Viscount Palmerston 1762	
East Looe (seat 2/2)	John Buller	
East Retford (seat 1/2)	John White	Administration
East Retford (seat 2/2)	John Shelley	
Edinburgh (seat 1/1)	George Lind – took office Replaced by James Coutts 1762	Administration
Edinburghshire (seat 1/1)	Sir Alexander Gilmour	
Elgin Burghs (seat 1/1)	Andrew Mitchell	
Elginshire (seat 1/1)	James Grant	
Essex (seat 1/2)	William Harvey – died Replaced by John Luther 1763	Tory
Essex (seat 2/2)	Sir William Maynard	
Evesham (seat 1/2)	Sir John Rushout, 4th Baronet	
Evesham (seat 2/2)	John Rushout	
Exeter (seat 1/2)	John Tuckfield – died Replaced by William Spicer 1767	
Exeter (seat 2/2)	John Rolle Walter	
Eye (seat 1/2)	Henry Cornwallis – died Replaced by Henry Townshend 1761 – died Replaced by The Viscount Allen 1762	
Eye (seat 2/2)	Viscount Brome – succeeded to peerage Replaced by Richard Burton 1762	
== F ==
Fife (seat 1/1)	James St. Clair – died Replaced by James Wemyss 1763	
Flint Boroughs (seat 1/1)	Sir John Glynne, 6th Baronet	
Flintshire (seat 1/1)	Sir Roger Mostyn	
Forfarshire (seat 1/1)	The 1st Earl Panmure	
Fowey (seat 1/2)	Jonathan Rashleigh – died Replaced by Philip Rashleigh 1765	
Fowey (seat 2/2)	George Edgcumbe – succeeded to peerage Replaced by Robert Walsingham 1761	
== G ==
Gatton (seat 1/2)	Thomas Brand	
Gatton (seat 2/2)	James Colebrooke – died Replaced by Edward Harvey 1761	
Glamorganshire (seat 1/1)	Sir Edmond Thomas – died Replaced by Richard Turbervill 1767	
Glasgow Burghs (seat 1/1)	Lord Frederick Campbell	
Gloucester (seat 1/2)	George Augustus Selwyn	
Gloucester (seat 2/2)	Charles Barrow	
Gloucestershire (seat 1/2)	Thomas Chester – died Replaced by Edward Southwell 1763	Tory
Gloucestershire (seat 2/2)	Norborne Berkeley – resigned Replaced by Thomas Tracy 1763	Tory
Grampound (seat 1/2)	Merrick Burrell	
Grampound (seat 2/2)	Simon Fanshawe	
Grantham (seat 1/2)	Sir John Cust, Bt	
Grantham (seat 2/2)	Lord George Manners	
Great Bedwyn (seat 1/2)	Thomas Cotes – died Replaced by Sir Thomas Fludyer 1767	
Great Bedwyn (seat 2/2)	William Woodley – took office Replaced by William Burke 1766	
Great Grimsby (seat 1/2)	Henry Knight – died Replaced by The Lord Luxborough 1762	
Great Grimsby (seat 2/2)	Joseph Mellish	
Great Marlow (seat 1/2)	William Clayton	
Great Marlow (seat 2/2)	William Mathew Burt	
Great Yarmouth (seat 1/2)	Charles Townshend of Honingham	
Great Yarmouth (seat 2/2)	Sir Edward Walpole	
Guildford (seat 1/2)	Sir John Elwill, 4th Baronet	
Guildford (seat 2/2)	George Onslow	
== H ==
Haddington Burghs (seat 1/1)	Sir Hew Dalrymple	
Haddingtonshire (seat 1/1)	Andrew Fletcher	
Hampshire (seat 1/2)	Henry Bilson Legge – died Replaced by Sir Richard Mill 1765	
Hampshire (seat 2/2)	Sir Simeon Stuart	
Harwich (seat 1/2)	Charles Townshend – died Replaced by Thomas Bradshaw 1767	
Harwich (seat 2/2)	John Roberts	
Haslemere (seat 1/2)	Thomas More Molyneux	
Haslemere (seat 2/2)	Philip Carteret Webb	
Hastings (seat 1/2)	Hon. James Brudenell	
Hastings (seat 2/2)	William Ashburnham	
Haverfordwest (seat 1/1)	William Edwardes	
Hedon (seat 1/2)	Charles Saunders	
Hedon (seat 2/2)	Peter Denis	
Helston (seat 1/2)	Francis Godolphin – succeeded to peerage Replaced by William Windham 1766	
Helston (seat 2/2)	John Evelyn – died Replaced by William Evelyn 1767	
Hereford (seat 1/2)	Charles Fitzroy Scudamore	
Hereford (seat 2/2)	John Symons – died Replaced by John Scudamore 1764	
Herefordshire (seat 1/2)	Velters Cornewall	
Herefordshire (seat 2/2)	Sir John Morgan – died Replaced by Thomas Foley 1767	
Hertford (seat 1/2)	John Calvert	
Hertford (seat 2/2)	Timothy Caswall	
Hertfordshire (seat 1/2)	Thomas Plumer Byde	
Hertfordshire (seat 2/2)	Jacob Houblon	
Heytesbury (seat 1/2)	William A'Court	Administration
Heytesbury (seat 2/2)	Pierce A'Court-Ashe	Administration
Higham Ferrers (seat 1/1)	John Yorke	
Hindon (seat 1/2)	Professor William Blackstone	
Hindon (seat 2/2)	Edward Morant	
Honiton (seat 1/2)	Henry Reginald Courtenay – died Replaced by Sir George Yonge 1763	
Honiton (seat 2/2)	John Duke	
Horsham (seat 1/2)	Charles Ingram – ennobled Replaced by Robert Pratt 1763	
Horsham (seat 2/2)	Sir Lionel Pilkington	
Huntingdon (seat 1/2)	Edward Montagu	
Huntingdon (seat 2/2)	Robert Jones	
Huntingdonshire (seat 1/2)	The 1st Baron Carysfort	
Huntingdonshire (seat 2/2)	Viscount Mandeville – succeeded to peerage Replaced by Lord Charles Greville Montagu 1762 – took office Replaced by Robert Bernard 1765	
Hythe (seat 1/2)	Lord George Sackville	
Hythe (seat 2/2)	William Glanville – died Replaced by William Amherst 1765	
== I ==
Ilchester (seat 1/2)	Joseph Tolson Lockyer – died Replaced by Peter Legh 1765	
Ilchester (seat 2/2)	The Earl of Egmont – sat for Bridgwater; Replaced by William Wilson 1761	
Inverness Burghs (seat 1/1)	Sir Alexander Grant, Bt	
Inverness-shire (seat 1/1)	Simon Fraser	
Ipswich (seat 1/2)	The Lord Orwell	
Ipswich (seat 2/2)	Thomas Staunton	
== K ==
Kent (seat 1/2)	Sir Wyndham Knatchbull Wyndham – died Replaced by Sir Brook Bridges 1763	
Kent (seat 2/2)	Robert Fairfax	Administration
Kincardineshire (seat 1/1)	Sir James Carnegie, Bt – died Replaced by Sir Alexander Ramsay Irvine 1765	
King's Lynn (seat 1/2)	Horace Walpole	
King's Lynn (seat 2/2)	Sir John Turner	
Kingston upon Hull (seat 1/2)	Lord Robert Manners	
Kingston upon Hull (seat 2/2)	Sir George Montgomery Metham – took office Replaced by William Weddell 1766	
Kinross-shire (seat 0/0)	Alternating seat with Clackmannanshire. No representation in 1761	
Kirkcudbright Stewartry (seat 1/1)	John Mackye	
Knaresborough (seat 1/2)	Lord John Cavendish	Rockingham Whig
Knaresborough (seat 2/2)	Sir Henry Slingsby – died Replaced by Sir Anthony Thomas Abdy 1763	Rockingham Whig
== L ==
Lanarkshire (seat 1/1)	Daniel Campbell	
Lancashire (seat 1/2)	Lord Strange	
Lancashire (seat 2/2)	James Shuttleworth	
Lancaster (seat 1/2)	(Sir) George Warren	
Lancaster (seat 2/2)	Francis Reynolds	
Launceston (seat 1/2)	Peter Burrell	
Launceston (seat 2/2)	Humphry Morice	
Leicester (seat 1/2)	George Wrighte – died Replaced by John Darker 1766	
Leicester (seat 2/2)	James Wigley – died Replaced by Anthony James Keck 1765	
Leicestershire (seat 1/2)	Sir Thomas Palmer – died Replaced by Sir John Palmer | 1765	
Leicestershire (seat 2/2)	Edward Smith – died Replaced by Sir Thomas Cave 1762	
Leominster (seat 1/2)	Chase Price – resigned Replaced by Edward Willes 1767 – took office Replaced by John Carnac 1768	
Leominster (seat 2/2)	Jenison Shafto	
Lewes (seat 1/2)	Thomas Sergison – died Replaced by Lord Edward Bentinck 1766	
Lewes (seat 2/2)	Sir Francis Poole – died Replaced by William Plumer 1763	
Lichfield (seat 1/2)	John Levett; Replaced on petition by Hugo Meynell 1762	
Lichfield (seat 2/2)	Thomas Anson	Administration
Lincoln (seat 1/2)	George Monson	
Lincoln (seat 2/2)	Coningsby Sibthorp	
Lincolnshire (seat 1/2)	Lord Brownlow Bertie	
Lincolnshire (seat 2/2)	Thomas Whichcot	
Linlithgow Burghs (seat 1/1)	John Lockhart-Ross	
Linlithgowshire (seat 1/1)	Charles Hope-Weir	
Liskeard (seat 1/2)	Philip Stephens	
Liskeard (seat 2/2)	Anthony Champion	
Liverpool (seat 1/2)	Sir William Meredith	
Liverpool (seat 2/2)	Sir Ellis Cunliffe – died Replaced by Richard Pennant 1767	
London (City of) (seat 1/4)	Sir Richard Glyn	
London (City of) (seat 2/4)	Sir Robert Ladbroke	
London (City of) (seat 3/4)	William Beckford	
London (City of) (seat 4/4)	Thomas Harley	
Lostwithiel (seat 1/2)	George Howard – took office Replaced by Viscount Beauchamp 1766	
Lostwithiel (seat 2/2)	James Edward Colleton	
Ludgershall (seat 1/2)	Thomas Whately	
Ludgershall (seat 2/2)	John Paterson	
Ludlow (seat 1/2)	Edward Herbert	
Ludlow (seat 2/2)	Henry Bridgeman	
Lyme Regis (seat 1/2)	Thomas Fane – succeeded to peerage Replaced by Lord Burghersh 1762	
Lyme Regis (seat 2/2)	Henry Fane	
Lymington (seat 1/2)	Adam Drummond	
Lymington (seat 2/2)	Harry Burrard	
== M ==
Maidstone (seat 1/2)	Rose Fuller	Whig
Maidstone (seat 2/2)	William Northey	Tory
Maldon (seat 1/2)	John Bullock	
Maldon (seat 2/2)	Bamber Gascoyne – took office Replaced by John Huske 1763	
Malmesbury (seat 1/2)	Thomas Conolly	
Malmesbury (seat 2/2)	The Earl Tylney	
Malton (seat 1/2)	Henry Finch – died Replaced by Savile Finch 1761	
Malton (seat 2/2)	John Mostyn	
Marlborough (seat 1/2)	Lord Brudenell – ennobled Replaced by James Long 1762	
Marlborough (seat 2/2)	Colonel the Hon. Robert Brudenell	
Marlow	see Great Marlow	...
Melcombe Regis	see Weymouth and Melcombe Regis	...
Merionethshire (seat 1/1)	William Vaughan	
Middlesex (seat 1/2)	Sir William Beauchamp-Proctor, Bt	Administration
Middlesex (seat 2/2)	George Cooke	Tory
Midhurst (seat 1/2)	William Hamilton – resigned Replaced by Bamber Gascoyne 1765	
Midhurst (seat 2/2)	John Burgoyne	
Milborne Port (seat 1/2)	Edward Walter	
Milborne Port (seat 2/2)	Thomas Medlycott – died Replaced by Thomas Hutchings Medlycott 1763	
Minehead (seat 1/2)	Henry Shiffner	
Minehead (seat 2/2)	The Earl of Thomond	
Mitchell (seat 1/2)	John Stephenson	
Mitchell (seat 2/2)	James Scawen	
Monmouth Boroughs (seat 1/1)	Benjamin Bathurst – died Replaced by John Stepney 1767	
Monmouthshire (seat 1/2)	William Morgan – died Replaced by Thomas Morgan 1763	
Monmouthshire (seat 2/2)	Capel Hanbury – died Replaced by John Hanbury 1766	
Montgomery (seat 1/1)	Richard Clive	
Montgomeryshire (seat 1/1)	Edward Kynaston	
Morpeth (seat 1/2)	Viscount Garlies	
Morpeth (seat 2/2)	Thomas Duncombe	
Much Wenlock (seat 1/2)	see Wenlock	...
== N ==
Nairnshire (seat 1/1)	Pryse Campbell	
Newark (seat 1/2)	John Manners	
Newark (seat 2/2)	Thomas Thoroton	
Newcastle-under-Lyme (seat 1/2)	Henry Vernon – died Replaced by Sir Lawrence Dundas 1762	
Newcastle-under-Lyme (seat 2/2)	John Waldegrave – succeeded to peerage Replaced by Thomas Gilbert 1763	
Newcastle-upon-Tyne (seat 1/2)	Sir Walter Calverley Blackett	
Newcastle-upon-Tyne (seat 2/2)	Matthew Ridley	
Newport (Cornwall) (seat 1/2)	John Lee – died Replaced by William de Grey 1761	
Newport (Cornwall) (seat 2/2)	Richard Bull	
Newport (Isle of Wight) (seat 1/2)	Charles Holmes – died Replaced by William Rawlinson Earle 1762	
Newport (Isle of Wight) (seat 2/2)	Thomas Lee Dummer – died Replaced by Thomas Dummer 1765	
New Radnor Boroughs (seat 1/1)	Edward Lewis	
New Romney (seat 1/2)	Sir Edward Dering	Tory
New Romney (seat 2/2)	Thomas Knight	
New Shoreham (seat 1/2)	Sir William Peere Williams – died Replaced by The Lord Pollington 1761	
New Shoreham (seat 2/2)	The Viscount Midleton – died Replaced by Samuel Cornish 1765	
Newton (Lancashire) (seat 1/2)	Randle Wilbraham	
Newton (Lancashire) (seat 2/2)	Peter Legh	
Newtown (Isle of Wight) (seat 1/2)	Sir John Barrington	
Newtown (Isle of Wight) (seat 2/2)	Harcourt Powell	
New Windsor (seat 1/2)	Augustus Keppel	
New Windsor (seat 2/2)	John Fitzwilliam	
New Woodstock (seat 1/2)	The 2nd Viscount Bateman	
New Woodstock (seat 2/2)	Anthony Keck – died Replaced by William Gordon 1767	
Norfolk (seat 1/2)	Armine Wodehouse	Tory
Norfolk (seat 2/2)	George Townshend – succeeded to peerage Replaced by Thomas de Grey 1764	Whig
Northallerton (seat 1/2)	Daniel Lascelles	
Northallerton (seat 2/2)	Edward Lascelles	
Northampton (seat 1/2)	Spencer Compton – succeeded to peerage Replaced by Lucy Knightley 1763	
Northampton (seat 2/2)	Frederick Montagu	
Northamptonshire (seat 1/2)	Sir Edmund Isham, Bt	Tory
Northamptonshire (seat 2/2)	William Cartwright	
Northern Burghs	see Tain Burghs	...
Northumberland (seat 1/2)	George Shafto Delaval	
Northumberland (seat 2/2)	Sir Henry Grey, 2nd Baronet	
Norwich (seat 1/2)	Harbord Harbord	
Norwich (seat 2/2)	Edward Bacon	
Nottingham (seat 1/2)	William Howe	
Nottingham (seat 2/2)	John Plumptre	
Nottinghamshire (seat 1/2)	Lord Robert Manners-Sutton – died Replaced by Thomas Willoughby 1762	
Nottinghamshire (seat 2/2)	John Thornhagh later Hewett	
== O ==
Okehampton (seat 1/2)	Alexander Forrester	
Okehampton (seat 2/2)	Wenman Coke	
Old Sarum (seat 1/2)	Thomas Pitt – died Replaced by Thomas Pitt 1761	
Old Sarum (seat 2/2)	Howell Gwynne	
Orford (seat 1/2)	John Offley	
Orford (seat 2/2)	Thomas Worsley	
Orkney and Shetland (seat 1/1)	James Douglas	
Oxford (seat 1/2)	Sir Thomas Stapleton	
Oxford (seat 2/2)	Robert Lee	
Oxfordshire (seat 1/2)	Lord Charles Spencer	Whig
Oxfordshire (seat 2/2)	Sir James Dashwood	Tory
Oxford University (seat 1/2)	Peregrine Palmer; Replaced by Sir Walter Bagot, Bt	Tory; Tory
Oxford University (seat 2/2)	Sir Roger Newdigate, Bt	Tory
== P ==
Peeblesshire (seat 1/1)	John Dickson – died Replaced by Adam Hay 1767	
Pembroke Boroughs (seat 1/1)	Sir William Owen, Bt	
Pembrokeshire (seat 1/1)	Sir John Philipps – died Replaced by Sir Richard Philipps 1765	
Penryn (seat 1/2)	Sir Edward Turner – died Replaced by Francis Basset 1766	
Penryn (seat 2/2)	George Brydges Rodney	
Perth Burghs (seat 1/1)	George Dempster	
Perthshire (seat 1/1)	John Murray – ennobled Replaced by David Graeme 1764	
Peterborough (seat 1/2)	Matthew Lamb	
Peterborough (seat 2/2)	Armstead Parker	Tory
Petersfield (seat 1/2)	John Jolliffe	
Petersfield (seat 2/2)	Richard Pennant – resigned to contest Liverpool; Replaced by Richard Croftes 1767	
Plymouth (seat 1/2)	The 2nd Viscount Barrington	
Plymouth (seat 2/2)	George Pocock	
Plympton Erle (seat 1/2)	William Baker	
Plympton Erle (seat 2/2)	George Treby – died Replaced by George Hele Treby 1761 – died Replaced by Paul Henry Ourry 1763	
Pontefract (seat 1/2)	The 2nd Viscount Galway	
Pontefract (seat 2/2)	William Gerard Hamilton	
Poole (seat 1/2)	Joseph Gulston – resigned Replaced by Joseph Gulston 1765	
Poole (seat 2/2)	Thomas Calcraft	
Portsmouth (seat 1/2)	Sir Edward Hawke	
Portsmouth (seat 2/2)	Sir Matthew Fetherstonhaugh, Bt	
Preston (seat 1/2)	Nicholas Fazackerley – died Replaced by Sir Peter Leicester 1767	
Preston (seat 2/2)	Edmund Starkie	
== Q ==
Queenborough (seat 1/2)	Charles Frederick	
Queenborough (seat 2/2)	Sir Peircy Brett	
== R ==
Radnor Boroughs	see New Radnor Boroughs	...
Radnorshire (seat 1/1)	Marquess of Carnarvon	Whig
Reading (seat 1/2)	John Dodd	Whig
Reading (seat 2/2)	Sir Francis Knollys	
Reigate (seat 1/2)	Charles Cocks	
Reigate (seat 2/2)	Charles Yorke	Whig
Renfrewshire (seat 1/1)	Patrick Craufurd	
Richmond (Yorkshire) (seat 1/2)	Sir Ralph Milbanke	
Richmond (Yorkshire) (seat 2/2)	Earl of Ancram – resigned Replaced by Thomas Dundas 1763	
Ripon (seat 1/2)	William Aislabie	doubtful
Ripon (seat 2/2)	William Lawrence	
Rochester (seat 1/2)	Viscount Parker – succeeded to peerage Replaced by Sir Charles Hardy 1764	
Rochester (seat 2/2)	Isaac Townsend – died Replaced by Grey Cooper 1765	
Romney	see New Romney	...
Ross-shire (seat 1/1)	James Stuart Mackenzie	
Roxburghshire (seat 1/1)	Walter Scott – took office Replaced by Gilbert Elliot 1765	
Rutland (seat 1/2)	Thomas Noel	Tory
Rutland (seat 2/2)	Hon. Thomas Chambers Cecil	
Rye (seat 1/2)	Phillips Gybbon – died Replaced by John Norris 1762	
Rye (seat 2/2)	John Bentinck	
== S ==
St Albans (seat 1/2)	James West	
St Albans (seat 2/2)	Viscount Nuneham	
St Germans (seat 1/2)	Edward Eliot	
St Germans (seat 2/2)	Philip Stanhope – resigned Replaced by William Hussey 1765	
St Ives (seat 1/2)	Humphrey Mackworth Praed	
St Ives (seat 2/2)	Charles Hotham	
St Mawes (seat 1/2)	James Newsham	
St Mawes (seat 2/2)	Richard Hussey	
St Michael's	see Mitchell	...
Salisbury (seat 1/2)	Hon. Edward Bouverie	
Salisbury (seat 2/2)	Julines Beckford – died Replaced by Samuel Eyre 1765	
Saltash (seat 1/2)	John Clevland – died Replaced by Augustus John Hervey 1763	
Saltash (seat 2/2)	George Adams	Whig
Sandwich (seat 1/2)	George Hay	
Sandwich (seat 2/2)	The Viscount Conyngham	
Sarum	see Old Sarum or for New Sarum see Salisbury	...
Scarborough (seat 1/2)	John Major	
Scarborough (seat 2/2)	William Osbaldeston – died Replaced by Fountayne Wentworth Osbaldeston 1766	
Seaford (seat 1/2)	William Hall Gage	
Seaford (seat 2/2)	James Peachey	
Selkirkshire (seat 1/1)	Gilbert Elliot – resigned to contest Roxburghshire; Replaced by John Pringle 1765	
Shaftesbury (seat 1/2)	Sir Gilbert Heathcote	Whig
Shaftesbury (seat 2/2)	Samuel Touchet	Whig
Shoreham	see New Shoreham	...
Shrewsbury (seat 1/2)	Thomas Hill	
Shrewsbury (seat 2/2)	Robert Clive	Tory
Shropshire (seat 1/2)	Sir John Astley, Bt	Tory
Shropshire (seat 2/2)	Richard Lyster – died Replaced by Charles Baldwyn 1766	Tory
Somerset (seat 1/2)	Sir Charles Kemys Tynte	
Somerset (seat 2/2)	Thomas Prowse – died Replaced by Sir Thomas Dyke Acland 1767	
Southampton (seat 1/2)	Hans Stanley	
Southampton (seat 2/2)	Henry Dawkins	
Southwark (seat 1/2)	Joseph Mawbey	
Southwark (seat 2/2)	Alexander Hume – died Replaced by Henry Thrale 1765	
Stafford (seat 1/2)	Hon. William Richard Chetwynd	
Stafford (seat 2/2)	William Richard Chetwynd- died Replaced by John Crewe 1765	
Staffordshire (seat 1/2)	William Bagot	Tory
Staffordshire (seat 2/2)	Lord Grey	Whig
Stamford (seat 1/2)	John Chaplin – died Replaced by George René Aufrère 1765	
Stamford (seat 2/2)	George Bridges Brudenell	
Steyning (seat 1/2)	Frazer Honywood – died Replaced by Richard Fuller 1764	
Steyning (seat 2/2)	John Thomlinson – died Replaced by Sir John Filmer 1767	
Stirling Burghs (seat 1/1)	Francis Holburne	
Stirlingshire (seat 1/1)	James Campbell	
Stockbridge (seat 1/2)	George Prescott	
Stockbridge (seat 2/2)	Nicholas Linwood	
Sudbury (seat 1/2)	Thomas Fonnereau	
Sudbury (seat 2/2)	John Henniker	
Suffolk (seat 1/2)	Sir Charles Bunbury, Bt	
Suffolk (seat 2/2)	Rowland Holt	Tory
Surrey (seat 1/2)	George Onslow	
Surrey (seat 2/2)	Sir Francis Vincent	
Sussex (seat 1/2)	Thomas Pelham	Whig
Sussex (seat 2/2)	John Butler – died Replaced by Lord George Henry Lennox 1767	. Rockingham Whig
Sutherland (seat 1/1)	Hon. Alexander Mackay	
== T ==
Tain Burghs (seat 1/1)	John Scott	
Tamworth (seat 1/2)	Hon. Thomas Villiers	
Tamworth (seat 2/2)	Viscount Villiers – took office Replaced by Edward Thurlow 1765	
Taunton (seat 1/2)	The 3rd Baron Carpenter – died Replaced by Laurence Sulivan 1762	
Taunton (seat 2/2)	Robert Maxwell	
Tavistock (seat 1/2)	Richard Rigby	
Tavistock (seat 2/2)	Richard Neville Neville	
Tewkesbury (seat 1/2)	Nicolson Calvert	
Tewkesbury (seat 2/2)	Sir William Codrington	Tory
Thetford (seat 1/2)	Henry Seymour Conway	Rockingham Whig
Thetford (seat 2/2)	Hon. Aubrey Beauclerk	
Thirsk (seat 1/2)	Henry Grenville – took office Replaced by James Grenville 1765	
Thirsk (seat 2/2)	Thomas Frankland	
Tiverton (seat 1/2)	Nathaniel Ryder	
Tiverton (seat 2/2)	Sir Edward Hussey Montagu – ennobled Replaced by Charles Gore 1762 – died Replaced by John Duntze 1768	
Totnes (seat 1/2)	Browse Trist – resigned Replaced by Henry Seymour 1763	
Totnes (seat 2/2)	Richard Savage Lloyd	
Tregony (seat 1/2)	William Trevanion – died Replaced by Thomas Pownall 1767	
Tregony (seat 2/2)	Abraham Hume	
Truro (seat 1/2)	Edward Boscawen John Boscawen – died Replaced by Edward Hugh Boscawen 1767	Tory; Tory
Truro (seat 2/2)	Lt General the Hon. George Boscawen	Tory
== W ==
Wallingford (seat 1/2)	John Hervey – died Replaced by Sir George Pigot 1765	
Wallingford (seat 2/2)	Sir John Gibbons, Bt	
Wareham (seat 1/2)	Thomas Erle Drax	
Wareham (seat 2/2)	John Pitt	
Warwick (seat 1/2)	Viscount Dungarvan – succeeded to peerage Replaced by Paul Methuen 1762	
Warwick (seat 2/2)	Henry Archer	
Warwickshire (seat 1/2)	Sir Charles Mordaunt	
Warwickshire (seat 2/2)	William Craven – succeeded to peerage Replaced by William Throckmorton Bromley 1765	
Wells (seat 1/2)	The Lord Digby – ennobled Replaced by double return Robert Child/Peter Taylor 1765; Replaced by Robert Child 1765	
Wells (seat 2/2)	Clement Tudway	
Wendover (seat 1/2)	Richard Chandler-Cavendish	
Wendover (seat 2/2)	Verney Lovett – resigned Replaced by Edmund Burke 1765	
Wenlock (seat 1/2)	Cecil Forester	
Wenlock (seat 2/2)	Brooke Forester	
Weobley (seat 1/2)	Marquess of Titchfield – succeeded to peerage Replaced by William Lynch 1762	
Weobley (seat 2/2)	Henry Frederick Thynne	
Westbury (seat 1/2)	Chauncy Townsend	
Westbury (seat 2/2)	Peregrine Bertie	
West Looe (seat 1/2)	William Trelawny – took office Replaced by James Townsend 1767	
West Looe (seat 2/2)	Francis Buller died Replaced by John Sargent 1765	
Westminster (seat 1/2)	Edward Cornwallis – took office Replaced by Edwin Sandys 1762	
Westminster (seat 2/2)	Viscount Pulteney – died Replaced by Lord Warkworth 1763	
Westmorland (seat 1/2)	Sir James Lowther – resigned to contest Cumberland; Replaced by Robert Lowther 1763 – resigned Replaced by John Robinson 1764	
Westmorland (seat 2/2)	John Upton	
Weymouth and Melcombe Regis (seat 1/4)	Sir Francis Dashwood – succeeded to peerage Replaced by Charles Walcott 1763	
Weymouth and Melcombe Regis (seat 2/4)	The Lord Waltham – died Replaced by Richard Jackson 1762	
Weymouth and Melcombe Regis (seat 3/4)	Richard Glover	
Weymouth and Melcombe Regis (seat 4/4)	John Tucker	
Whitchurch (seat 1/2)	George Jennings	
Whitchurch (seat 2/2)	Thomas Townshend	
Wigan (seat 1/2)	Fletcher Norton	
Wigan (seat 2/2)	Simon Luttrell	
Wigtown Burghs (seat 1/1)	Archibald Montgomerie – sat for Ayrshire; Replaced by Keith Stewart 1762; Replaced by	
Wigtownshire (seat 1/1)	John Hamilton – resigned to contest Wigtown Burghs; Replaced by James Murray 1762	
Wilton (seat 1/2)	Robert Herbert	
Wilton (seat 2/2)	Nicholas Herbert	
Wiltshire (seat 1/2)	Sir Robert Long, Bt – died Replaced by Thomas Goddard 1767	
Wiltshire (seat 2/2)	Edward Popham	
Winchelsea (seat 1/2)	The Earl of Thomond – took office Replaced by Thomas Sewell 1761	
Winchelsea (seat 2/2)	Thomas Orby Hunter	
Winchester (seat 1/2)	Henry Penton	
Winchester (seat 2/2)	Lord Harry Powlett – succeeded to peerage Replaced by George Paulet 1765	
Windsor	see New Windsor	...
Woodstock	see New Woodstock	...
Wootton Bassett (seat 1/2)	Major the Hon. Henry St John	
Wootton Bassett (seat 2/2)	Thomas Estcourt Cresswell	
Worcester (seat 1/2)	John Walsh	
Worcester (seat 2/2)	Henry Crabb-Boulton	
Worcestershire (seat 1/2)	John Ward	
Worcestershire (seat 2/2)	William Dowdeswell	
Wycombe	see Chipping Wycombe	...
== Y ==
Yarmouth (Isle of Wight) (seat 1/2)	Thomas Holmes – died Replaced by John Eames 1765	
Yarmouth (Isle of Wight) (seat 2/2)	Henry Holmes – died Replaced by Jeremiah Dyson 1762	
Yarmouth (Norfolk)	see Great Yarmouth	...
York (seat 1/2)	Sir George Armytage	
York (seat 2/2)	Robert Fox-Lane	Tory
Yorkshire (seat 1/2)	Edwin Lascelles	Tory
Yorkshire (seat 2/2)	Sir George Savile	

== By-elections ==
- List of Great Britain by-elections (1754–74)

== See also ==
- 1761 British general election
- List of parliaments of Great Britain
- Unreformed House of Commons
