= Alexander Hume-Campbell =

- Alexander Hume-Campbell, 2nd Earl of Marchmont (1675–1740)
- Alexander Hume-Campbell (1708–1760)
