= Robert Lowther =

Robert Lowther may refer to:

- Bobby Lowther (Robert Carswell Lowther, Sr., 1923–2015), American athlete and coach
- Robert Lowther (died 1430), MP for Cumberland (UK Parliament constituency)
- Robert Lowther (colonial administrator) (1681–1745), Governor of Barbados and Member of Parliament for Westmorland 1705–1708
- Robert Lowther (1741–1777), Member of Parliament for Westmorland 1759–1761 and 1763–1764
