= Napier baronets of Middle Marsh (1641) =

Escutcheon of the Napier baronets of Middle Marsh

The Napier baronetcy, of Middle Marsh (Middlemarsh Hall) in the County of Dorset, was created in the Baronetage of England on 25 June 1641 for Gerrard Napier. He was the son of Sir Nathaniel Napier, Member of Parliament for Dorset, and himself represented the constituencies of Wareham and Weymouth and Melcombe Regis.

The title became extinct on the death of the 6th Baronet in 1765.

== Napier baronets, of Middle Marsh (1641) ==
- Sir Gerrard Napier, 1st Baronet (1606–1673)
- Sir Nathaniel Napier, 2nd Baronet (c. 1636–1709)
- Sir Nathaniel Napier, 3rd Baronet (c. 1668–1728)
- Sir William Napier, 4th Baronet (c. 1696–1753)
- Sir Gerrard Napier, 5th Baronet (c. 1701–1759)
- Sir Gerard Napier, 6th Baronet (c. 1740–1765)
