= Sir Gerard Napier, 6th Baronet =

Member of Parliament for Bridport
- In office 1761 – 25 January 1765 Serving with Thomas Coventry

Personal details
- Born: 1739
- Died: 25 January 1765 (aged 25–26)
- Parent: Sir Gerard Napier, 5th Baronet (father)
- Relatives: Edward Phelips (maternal grandfather)
- Education: Eton College
- Alma mater: Trinity College, Oxford

Gerard Napier (1739 – 25 January 1765) was an English nobleman of the Napier baronets. He was Member of Parliament for Bridport.

== See also ==
- List of MPs elected in the 1761 British general election
