= George Metham =

English politician (1716–1793)

Member of the Parliament of Great Britain for Kingston upon Hull
- In office 4 July 1757 – March 1766 Serving with Robert Manners

Personal details
- Born: 6 February 1716
- Died: 2 March 1793 (aged 77)
- Education: Trinity Hall, Cambridge; Inner Temple; Académie royale
- Occupation: High Sheriff of Yorkshire

Sir George Montgomery Metham (6 February 1716 – 2 March 1793) was an English politician who served as a Member of Parliament (MP). He inherited the family manor in Yorkshire. He owned estates at Drewton, North Cave and South Cave.

== See also ==
- List of MPs elected in the 1761 British general election
