= Richard Savage Lloyd =

British landowner and Member of Parliament

Richard Savage Lloyd (c.1730–1810), of Hintlesham Hall, Suffolk, was a British landowner and Member of Parliament.

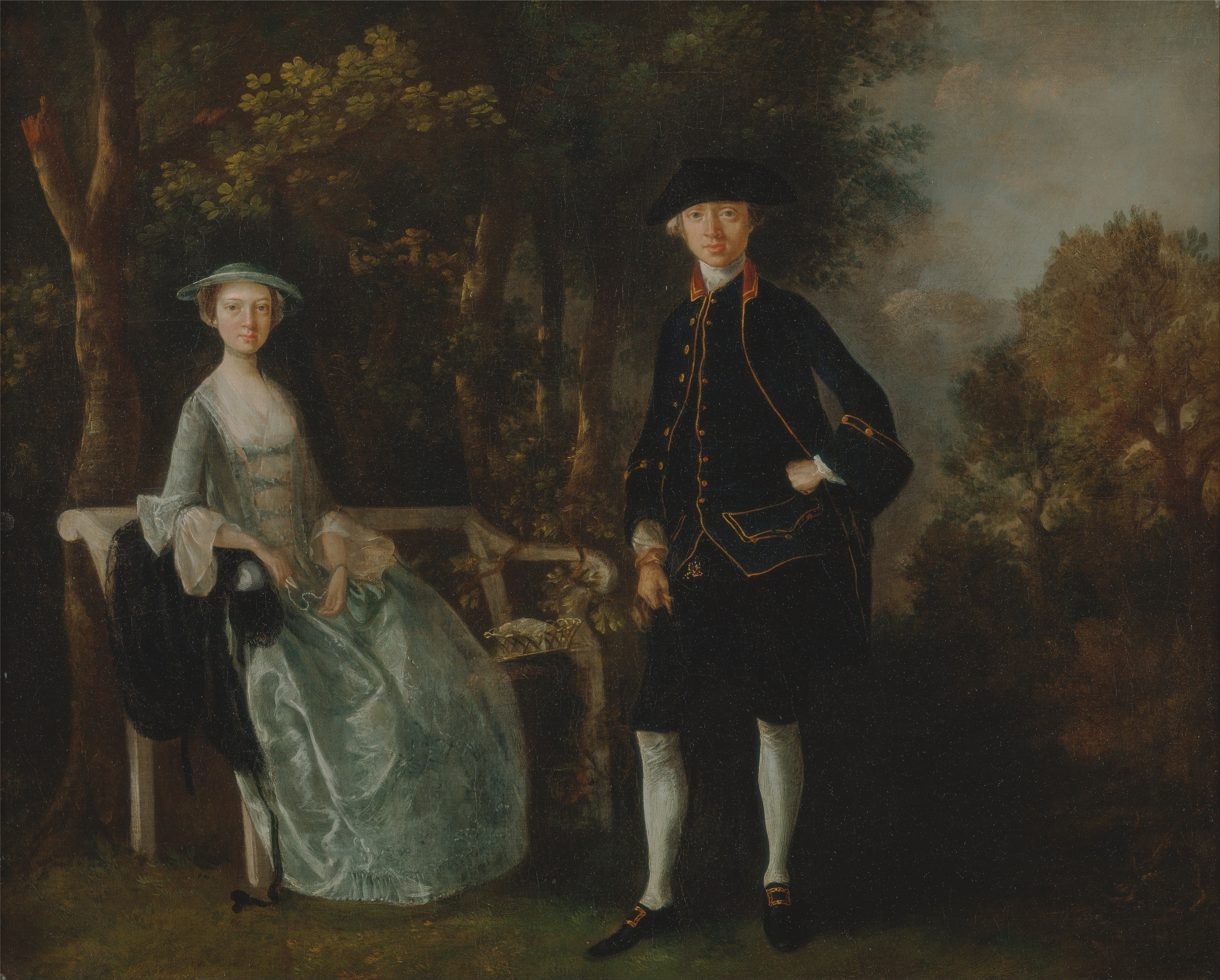
Richard Savage Lloyd and mother. Painting by Thomas Gainsborough, 1745

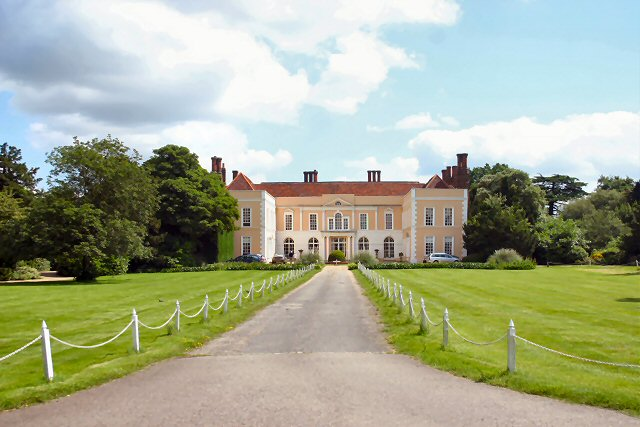
Hintlesham Hall, Suffolk

He was the eldest son of Sir Richard Lloyd of Hintlesham, lawyer and solicitor-general and was educated at Eton College (1742–48) and St. John’s College, Cambridge. Like his father before him, he then entered the Middle Temple to study law. He succeeded his father in 1761 to Hintlesham Hall, now a Grade I listed building.

He sat in the House of Commons of Great Britain from 1759 to 1768 as a Member of Parliament (MP) for Totnes.

He married and had 2 sons and 2 daughters and was succeeded by Richard Savage Lloyd, jnr.

Parliament of Great Britain
Preceded by Sir Richard Lloyd; Browse Trist	Member of Parliament for Totnes; 1759 – 1768; With: Browse Trist to 1763; Henry Seymour 1763–68	Succeeded by Peter Burrell; Sir Philip Jennings-Clerke, Bt
