= Daniel Bull =

Australian mountaineer

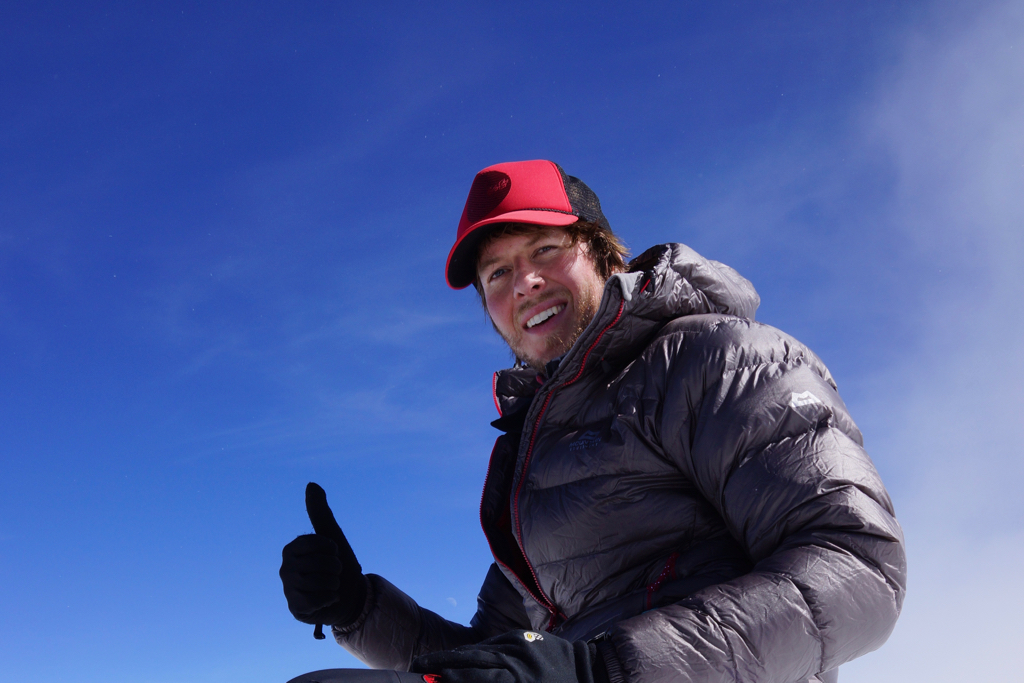

Personal information
- Nationality: Australian
- Born: Daniel William Bull; November 21, 1980 (age 45) Australia
- Education: Monash University
- Occupation(s): Adventurer, mountain climber, professional speaker
- Years active: 2006 - present
- Website: Official website

Sport
- Sport: Mountaineer
- Rank: 1x World Record Holder

Daniel Bull (born 1980) is an Australian adventurer, mountain climber, and professional speaker. He has climbed the Seven Summits and the Volcanic Seven Summits. He also holds the world record for the highest altitude kayaking. He currently works as a motivational speaker.

== Early life and education ==
Bull was born in 1980 to Martin and Jill Bull. He attended St. Bede's College in Mentone. He went on to Monash University where he studied a double degree in business accounting and computer science. Bull began a career in IT consulting in business intelligence while pursuing his lifestyle as an adventurer.

== Career ==
Bull became the youngest Australian to climb Ama Dablam in the Himalayas, doing so at the age of 23. During his career, he has also been the first to ascend many unclimbed peaks. Between 2006 and 2017, Bull climbed the highest mountains and volcanoes on each of the seven continents. He was 36 years old when he completed the challenge. He was also the first Australian to accomplish the feat.

In 2017, Bull completed back-to-back climbs of both the highest mountain and highest volcano in Antarctica, becoming the first Australian to ascend Mount Sidley. In 2018, he set another world record for the highest altitude kayaking, completing the feat on a lake in Ojos del Salado.

== World records ==
- January 4, 2020 – Highest altitude swim
