= Henry Townshend (died 1762) =

English politician

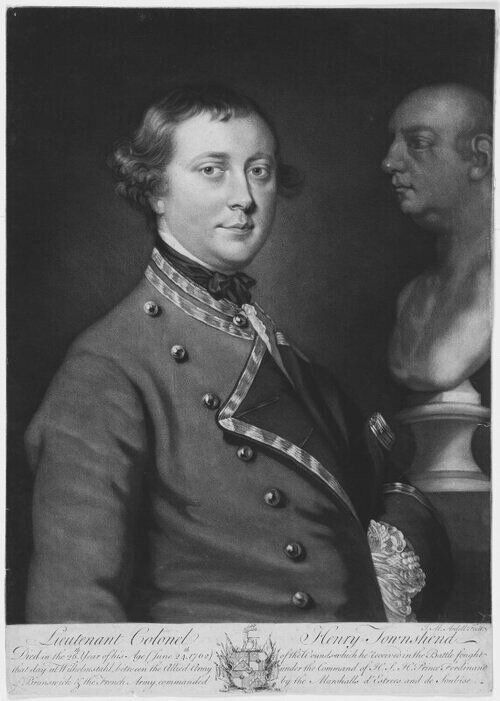
- mezzotint by James MacArdell
- Born: 26 September 1736
- Died: 24 June 1762 (aged 25)
- Occupation: Politician
- Parent(s): Thomas Townshend

Henry Townshend (1736–1762), was an English politician.

He was a Member of Parliament (MP) for Eye 15 April 1758 – January 1760 and 4 December 1761 – 24 June 1762.
