= John Roberts (poet) =

British Politician and Poet

John Roberts MP (1712–1772) was an 18th-century British politician and poet.

== Life ==
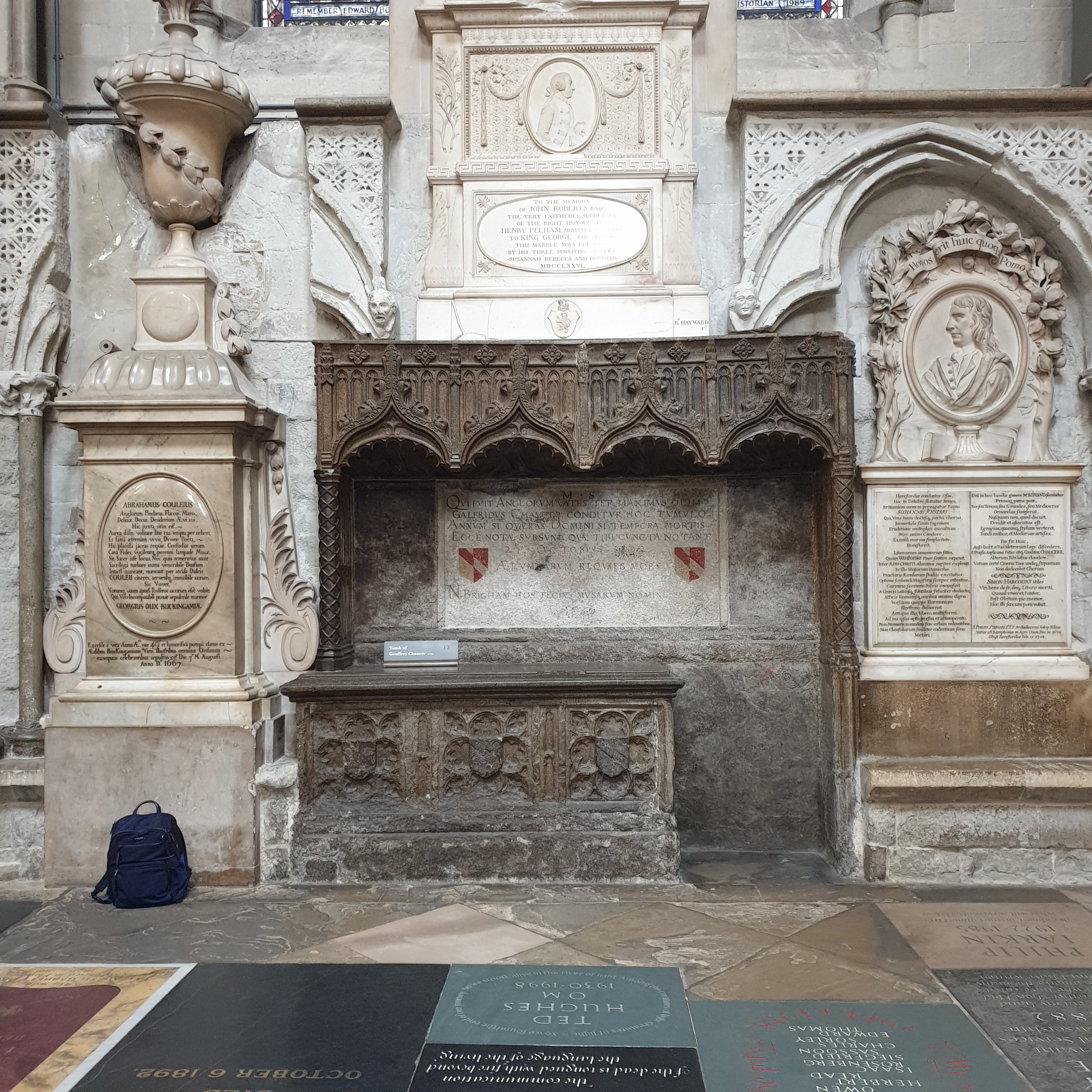
The memorial to John Roberts in Poets Corner – top centre above the tomb of Geoffrey Chaucer

He was born in Chester in 1711 or 1712 the son of Edward Roberts the city registrar, and his wife, Elizabeth. He was educated at Westminster School from 1723 then studied medicine at Christ Church, Oxford from 1728. He quit Oxford without graduating around 1730 to begin tutoring the children of Henry Pelham MP. The two men became friends and Pelham then employed him as his Private Secretary a role which Roberts continued during Pelham's career as Prime Minister of Great Britain (1743–1754).

Pelham introduced him to various other political roles, many of which overlapped, allowing him multiple salaries. These included: Deputy Paymaster of Gibraltar 1743 to 1761; Inspector of the Out Ports (Exports) in the London Custom House 1746 to 1762; Receiver of Quit Rents in Virginia 1748 until death; a pension from the Irish Establishment of £800 per annum from 1754 until death; working at the Department of Trade 1761/2 and 1765–1772.From 1754 to 1756 he was paymaster to the British Secret Service (at that time mainly spying on France) under Pelham's nephew Pelham-Holles as Prime Minister.

One of Lady Catherine Pelham's achievements was to get Roberts to be the candidate for the Harwich constituency. Pelham had identified a vacancy and she obtained Prime Minister Newcastle's commitment that Roberts would be assigned the seat. However in 1761, there was a new King and George III had his own mind for a candidate, Charles Townshend. It is a measure of Catherine's character that Newcastle could not decide who to please and who to disappoint. Newcastle's solution was ingenious. There was one vacancy but Harwich returned two candidates. Newcastle persuaded the sitting candidate at Harwich to move elsewhere so that he could then install both Katherine's and the King's candidate in Harwich. He served as MP to Harwich from 1761 to 1771. During this period, in October 1765 he became involved in the debates on the troubles in the American colonies and the Stamp Tax riots, and encouraged that the worst rioters should be made example of (i.e. hung).

He owned property in Harwich, Esher, Orford and London and died in London on 13 July 1772.

In 1776 a monument was erected to his memory in Poets Corner in Westminster Abbey the highest accolade for a British poet. The memorial lies above that of Geoffrey Chaucer and was sculpted by Richard Hayward.

== Family ==
His son John Christopher Roberts (1739–1810) held various civil service roles including Secretary to the Province of Quebec.

== Artistic recognition ==
He was portrayed with Pelham by John Shackleton and a solo portrait by William Hoare
