= John Jeffreys (1706–1766) =

Welsh politician (1706–1766)

John Jeffreys (1706 – 30 January 1766) of The Priory, Brecon, and Sheen, Surrey, was a Welsh politician who sat in the House of Commons from 1734 to 1766. He lost a fortune gambling but was awarded lucrative public positions under successive Administrations.

Jeffreys was the eldest son of John Jeffreys, MP and his wife Elizabeth Sturt, daughter of Anthony Sturt, MP of London. His father and his uncle, Sir Jeffrey Jeffreys were wealthy tobacco merchants. He was a member of White's Club and succeeded his father in 1715 but was a gamester who soon ran through his fortune.

Jeffreys contested Brecon at the 1727 British general election, but was unsuccessful. He was returned as Member of Parliament for Breconshire by a small majority at the 1734 British general election. He began his career in opposition, and became an adherent of Pulteney. He was returned unopposed at the 1741 British general election. After the fall of Walpole in 1742, Pulteney made him Joint Secretary to the Treasury, worth about £5,000 p.a. at the time. Horace Walpole described the appointment as White's contribution to the Government. Jeffreys was the only friend of Pulteney who was not turned out of office at the end of 1744. It was said that he was inefficient and incapable of carrying on the business of the Treasury and that almost everybody in the House of Commons wondered what public reason could be given for keeping him in post. Pelham, who was a fellow member of White's, replied that Jeffreys was a good retired inoffensive creature, and the public had no interest in his appointment, so he was not going to react to the resentment of others. However, in 1746 Pelham wanted to ensure a competent replacement for the octogenarian Secretary to the Treasury, and Jeffreys resigned from his position in May 1746, taking an anuual payment of £1,000 p.a. in compensation.

At the 1747 British general election Jeffreys was returned unopposed as MP for Dartmouth. In due course he was appointed secretary to the Chancellor of the Exchequer in 1752 and stayed in post until 1754. He was returned unopposed again at the 1754 British general election and was appointed Warden of the Mint in 1754. In 1757 he was appointed deputy ranger of St James's and Hyde Parks. He was returned for Dartmouth unopposed again at the 1761 British general election and in 1761 he was given a regular secret service pension of £500 p.a. He continued to support and be financially supported by successive Governments.

Jeffreys died unmarried on 30 January 1766.

Parliament of Great Britain
Preceded by William Gwyn Vaughan	Member of Parliament for Breconshire; 1734–1747	Succeeded by Thomas Morgan
Preceded by Lord Archibald Hamilton; Walter Carey	Member of Parliament for Dartmouth; 1747–1766; With: Walter Carey 1747-1757; Captain the Hon. Richard Howe 1757-1766	Succeeded by Richard Hopkins; Captain the Hon. Richard Howe
