= Alexander Hume-Campbell (1708–1760) =

The Honourable Alexander Hume-Campbell KC (15 February 1708 – 19 July 1760), of Birghamsheil, Berwickshire, was a Scottish lawyer and politician who sat in the House of Commons almost continuously from 1734 to 1760.

Hume-Campbell was the second surviving son of Alexander Hume-Campbell, 2nd Earl of Marchmont and his wife Margaret Campbell, daughter of Sir George Campbell of Cessnock. He was educated at a private school in London from 1716 until possibly 1721. He was in the Netherlands in Utrecht and Franeker between 1721 and probably 1725. He attended the University of Edinburgh and became an advocate in 1729. He entered Inner Temple and was called to the bar in 1731. He married Elizabeth Pettis of Savile Row, London on 16 July 1737.

At the 1734 British general election, Hume-Campbell was returned as Member of Parliament for Berwickshire at the same time as his twin brother Lord Polwarth was elected MP for Berwick-upon-Tweed. There was a double return at the 1741 British general election and he was eventually declared elected on 19 January 1742. He was Solicitor-general to the Prince of Wales from December 1741 to January 1746. He was returned again for Berwickshire in 1747. For most of the time from 1734 to 1754 he was in opposition, and during that time he built up a considerable practice at the English bar.

Hume Campbell was returned again for Berwickshire at the 1754 general election and took a very active part ... in support of the King's measures’. He was willing to connect himself with Newcastle in return for help against Pitt over the subsidy treaties. The brothers sought full support for their Berwickshire interest. In 1756 he was appointed Lord Clerk Register of Scotland and held the post for the rest of his life.

Hume-Campbell died without issue on 19 July 1760.

== Sources ==
- "Marchmont And The Humes of Polwarth By one of Their Descendants". 1894. ISBN 0-902664-30-1

Parliament of Great Britain
Preceded by George Baillie	Member of Parliament for Berwickshire; 1734–1760	Succeeded by James Pringle
Political offices
Preceded by Richard Hollings	Solicitor-General of the Duchy of Cornwall; 1741–1746	Succeeded by Henry Bathurst
Preceded by The Marquess of Lothian	Lord Clerk Register; 1756–1760	Succeeded by The Earl of Morton
