= Henry Cornwallis (MP for Eye) =

British Member of Parliament (1740–1761)

Honorable Henry Cornwallis (1740-1761), was an English Member of Parliament.

He was a Member (MP) of the Parliament of England for Eye 30 March-April 1761. He died on his way back from Germany to take his seat in Parliament. He was the brother of Charles, Viscount Brome.
