= Peter Taylor (paymaster) =

Former politician

Peter Taylor (1714–1777) was a British administrator and politician who made a fortune as paymaster during the Seven Years' War and sat in the House of Commons between 1765 and 1777.

Taylor was the second son of Robert Taylor, a grocer of Wells, Somerset and was born on 11 November 1714. In 1728 he was apprenticed to Charles Lewis, a goldsmith of Wincanton, Somerset. He married Jane Holt, probably at the non-conformist Somerset House chapel, on 22 April 1740. In 1755 he was a silversmith at Cecil Street on the Strand, London.

By 1756 he knew politicians Henry Fox and John Calcraft and was making himself useful to Fox. When the Seven Years' War broke out in 1757 he was appointed Deputy Paymaster in Germany where he spent five years. He was at times dealing with £150,000 a month and questions were raised about his conduct. He returned to England in 1763 with poor reputation but possessing a large fortune. He acquired an estate at Burcott, near Wells, and in 1764 another at Purbrook Park, near Portsmouth. There he considerably improved the land and built an “elegant mansion” designed by Sir Robert Taylor in about 1770. He wanted a seat in Parliament but this was to crown his success rather than to do anything useful there.

In 1765, when Lord Digby the sitting Member for Wells was raised to the peerage, Taylor declared himself a candidate. The campaign lasted several months, and it became a very fierce contest. Taylor's son Robert Paris Taylor was High Sheriff of Somerset in 1765–6 so Taylor's party was able to take possession of the writ. Rival polls were held and Taylor was returned as Member of Parliament for Wells. He was then unseated on 15 January 1766, and his petition was rejected. His opponents then created create a large number of honorary freemen, who could vote and he was defeated after another expensive contest when he stood again for Wells in 1768. A vacancy occurred at Portsmouth in March 1774, and Taylor declared himself a candidate having gained the support of Administration. He was opposed by Joshua Iremonger, but defeated him at the by-election on 29 March 1774, and again at the 1774 general election. Taylor does not appear to have spoken in Parliament.

Taylor died on 3 November 1777. He had at least one son who was alleged to have got drunk twice a day.

Parliament of Great Britain
Preceded by The Lord Digby; Clement Tudway	Member of Parliament for Wells; 1765–1766; With: Clement Tudway	Succeeded by Robert Child; Clement Tudway
Preceded by Sir Edward Hawke; Sir Matthew Fetherstonhaugh, Bt	Member of Parliament for Portsmouth; 1774–1777; With: Sir Matthew Fetherstonhaugh, Bt; Maurice Suckling	Succeeded by Maurice Suckling; Sir William Gordon
