= Browse Trist =

English politician

Browse Trist (1698?–1777), of Bowden, near Totnes, Devon, was an English politician.

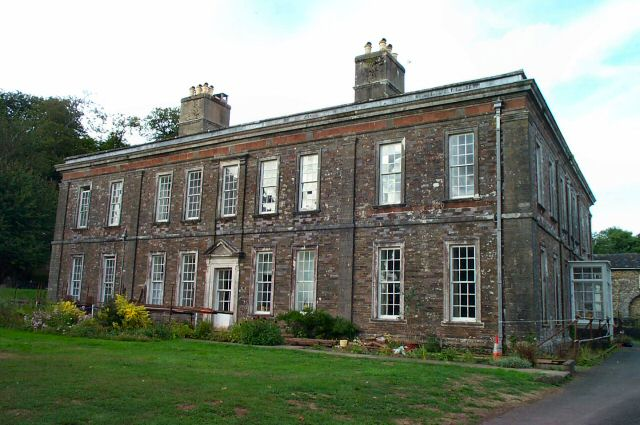
Bowden House, Devon

He was born the son of Nicholas Trist of Bowden and educated at Wadham College, Oxford.

He was a Member (MP) of the Parliament of Great Britain for Totnes 1754 - March 1763.

In 1734 he married Agnes, daughter of Thomas Hore of Nymph, Devon, with whom he went on to have 6 sons and 3 daughters. The lived at Bowden House.

== Family in America ==
Browse Trist's son Hore Browse Trist emigrated to the United States, where he befriended Thomas Jefferson, obtained from him a government appointment, and settled in Mississippi.
