= Robert Lowther (1741–1777) =

English Member of Parliament

Robert Lowther (1741–1777) was an English member of parliament, the younger son of Robert Lowther and Catherine Pennington and younger brother of James Lowther, 1st Earl of Lonsdale.

Brought into Parliament for the Government through his older brother's interest, Robert defied the ministry and voted in favor of John Wilkes in 1763. For this, Lonsdale had him removed from his seat, and Robert died in obscurity.

Parliament of Great Britain
Preceded by John Dalston; Sir George Dalston, Bt	Member of Parliament for Westmorland; 1759–1761; With: Sir George Dalston, Bt	Succeeded by Sir James Lowther, Bt; John Upton
Preceded by Sir James Lowther, Bt; John Upton	Member of Parliament for Westmorland; 1763–1764; With: John Upton	Succeeded by John Upton; John Robinson
