= Paul Methuen =

Paul Methuen may refer to:

- Paul Methuen (reformer) (fl. 1566), Scottish reformer
- Sir Paul Methuen (diplomat) (c. 1672–1757), British diplomat, Secretary of State, Privy Councillor, MP for Devizes 1708–1710, Brackley 1715–1747
- Paul Methuen (MP) (1723–1795), MP for Westbury 1747–1748, for Warwick 1762–1768, Great Bedwyn 1774–1781
- Paul Cobb Methuen (1752–1816), MP for Great Bedwyn 1781–1784
- Paul Methuen, 1st Baron Methuen (1779–1849), British politician, MP for Wiltshire 1812–1819 and 1832–1837
- Paul Methuen, 3rd Baron Methuen (1845–1932), British military commander and Governor of Natal Colony 1909–1910
- Paul Ayshford Methuen, 4th Baron Methuen (1886–1974), British herpetologist and batrachologist
- Paul Methuen (clothier) (1613–1667), English clothier
