= Methuen =

Methuen may refer to:

- Methuen (surname)
- Methuen, Massachusetts, a U.S. city
  - Methuen High School
  - Methuen Mall
- Baron Methuen, a British title of nobility
- Methuen Cove, South Orkney Islands
- Methuen Publishing, Methuen & Co. Ltd., a British publishing firm
- Methuen Treaty, a 1703 treaty on wine and textiles trade between Portugal and England

== See also ==
- Methven (disambiguation)
- Methuen Memorial Music Hall
- Methuen Police Department
- Methuen Water Works
- Methuen's Dwarf Gecko
