= Robert Methuen, 7th Baron Methuen =

British engineer, politician and peer

The Right Honourable The Lord Methuen

Member of the House of Lords
- Lord Temporal
- Hereditary peerage 15 December 1994 – 11 November 1999
- Preceded by: The 6th Baron Methuen
- Succeeded by: Seat abolished
- Elected Hereditary Peer; 11 November 1999 – 9 July 2014
- Election: 1999
- Preceded by: Seat established
- Succeeded by: The 3rd Earl of Oxford and Asquith

Personal details
- Born: 22 July 1931 Corsham, Wiltshire, England
- Died: 9 July 2014 (aged 82) Ashbourne, Derbyshire, England
- Party: Liberal Democrat
- Children: 2 daughters
- Education: Trinity College, Cambridge
- Occupation: Politician

Robert Alexander Holt Methuen, 7th Baron Methuen (22 July 1931 – 9 July 2014), was a British Liberal Democrat peer. He was one of the ninety hereditary peers elected to remain in the House of Lords after the House of Lords Act 1999.

== Biography ==
Methuen was the third and youngest son of Anthony Methuen, 5th Baron Methuen, by his wife Grace Durning Holt, daughter of Sir Richard Durning Holt, Bt. He was educated at Shrewsbury School before going up to Trinity College, Cambridge, where he graduated in 1957 with a Bachelor of Arts (BA) degree in Engineering.

Methuen worked as a design engineer for Westinghouse Brake and Signal Company from 1957 to 1967, and then as a computer systems engineer for IBM UK Ltd from 1968 to 1975 and for Rolls-Royce Holdings plc from 1975 to 1994. In 1994, he succeeded his elder brother to the title. In the House of Lords, he served on the Science and Technology Select Committee and other committees. He also voted to block the Marriage (Same Sex Couples) Act 2013.

Lord Methuen married firstly Mary Catherine Jane Hooper in 1958; they divorced in 1993. He married secondly Margrit Andrea Hadwiger one year later. He has two daughters by his first wife: Charlotte Mary Methuen (born 1964) and Henrietta Christian Methuen-Jones (born 1965) who later changed her name to Kittie. Kittie was married to Robert Jones (who took the surname Methuen-Jones) and has three children: Teresa Methuen-Jones (born 1990), Keziah Methuen-Jones (born 1992) and Miriam Methuen-Jones (born 1997).

He died after a short illness on 9 July 2014. He was succeeded in the title by his first cousin once removed, James Methuen-Campbell (born 1952).

== Ancestry ==
Ancestors of Robert Methuen, 7th Baron Methuen

8. Frederick Methuen, 2nd Baron Methuen
4. Paul Methuen, 3rd Baron Methuen
9. Anna Sanford
2. Anthony Methuen, 5th Baron Methuen
10. William Sanford
5. Mary Sanford
11. Sarah Seymour
1. Robert Methuen, 7th Baron Methuen
12. Robert Holt
6. Sir Richard Durning Holt, 1st Baronet
13. Lawrencina Potter
3. Grace Durning Holt
14. John Wells
7. Eliza Wells
15. Grace Tileston

== Arms ==
Coat of arms of Robert Methuen, 7th Baron Methuen
Escutcheon Argent three wolves’ heads erased Proper on the breast of an eagle with two heads displayed Sable. Supporters On either side two fiery lynxes reguardant Proper collared having a line passing between their forelegs reflexed over their backs Or. Motto Virtus Invidiae Scopus

== See also ==
- Baron Methuen

== Notes ==
Peerage of the United Kingdom
Preceded by John Methuen	Baron Methuen; 1994–2014; Member of the House of Lords (1994–1999)	Succeeded by James Methuen-Campbell
Parliament of the United Kingdom
New office created by the House of Lords Act 1999	Elected hereditary peer to the House of Lords under the House of Lords Act 1999; 1999–2014	Succeeded by The Earl of Oxford and Asquith
