= Namazonurus campbelli =

Conservation status
- Least Concern (IUCN 3.1)

Scientific classification
- Kingdom: Animalia
- Phylum: Chordata
- Class: Reptilia
- Order: Squamata
- Family: Cordylidae
- Genus: Namazonurus
- Species: N. campbelli

Binomial name
- Namazonurus campbelli (V. FitzSimons, 1938)

Synonyms
- Zonurus campbelli V. FitzSimons, 1938; Cordylus campbelli — V. FitzSimons, 1943; Cordylus campbelli — Adolphs, 2006; Namazonurus campbelli — Stanley et al., 2011

Species of lizard

Namazonurus campbelli, commonly known as Campbell's girdled lizard, is a species of lizard in the family Cordylidae. A small girdled lizard, N. campbelli is endemic to Namibia. It is often mistaken for the more common Herero girdled lizard, N. pustulatus, as they both are similar in size and have flattened bodies. N. campbelli lives in rock crevices and cracks on dry mountain slopes.

== Etymology ==
The generic name, Namazonurus, contains "zonurus " meaning "girdle-tailed".

The specific name, campbelli, is in honor of William A. Campbell (1880–1962), the owner of the Farm "Barby" where the type specimen was discovered.

== Description ==
N. campbelli has a spiky appearance. The caudal scales are strongly keeled and spinose, and the spines are longest on the flanks. The head is a darker brown colour and the back is a chestnut to light brown, covered with smallish yellow spots with patchy dark-brown crossbars that sometimes bear a dark band to the centre. The belly is off-white.

Snout-to-vent length (SVL) of adults is 60 to 75 mm (2.4 to 3.0 in), with a maximum SVL of 79 mm (3.1 in).

N. campbelli can be differentiated from N. namaquensis which has a well-marked dark streak on the side of the head and two narrow streaks along the sides of the body (absent in N. campbelli ), and no pale spots down the middle of the back (present in N. campbelli ).

== Reproduction ==
N. campbelli is ovoviviparous.

== Geographic range ==
N. campbelli has a restricted distribution 25 km (16 mi) east of Helmeringhausen area in Namibia. It is only known from Lovedale, Barby, and Kunjas Farms. The distribution area is approximately 6,746 km^{2} (2,605 sq mi).

== Habitat ==
The preferred natural habitat of Z. campbelli is rocky areas of arid savanna, at altitudes of 1,200–1,700 m (3,900–5,600 ft).

== See also ==
- Cordylus
