= Corsham Court =

Grade I listed country house in Corsham, England

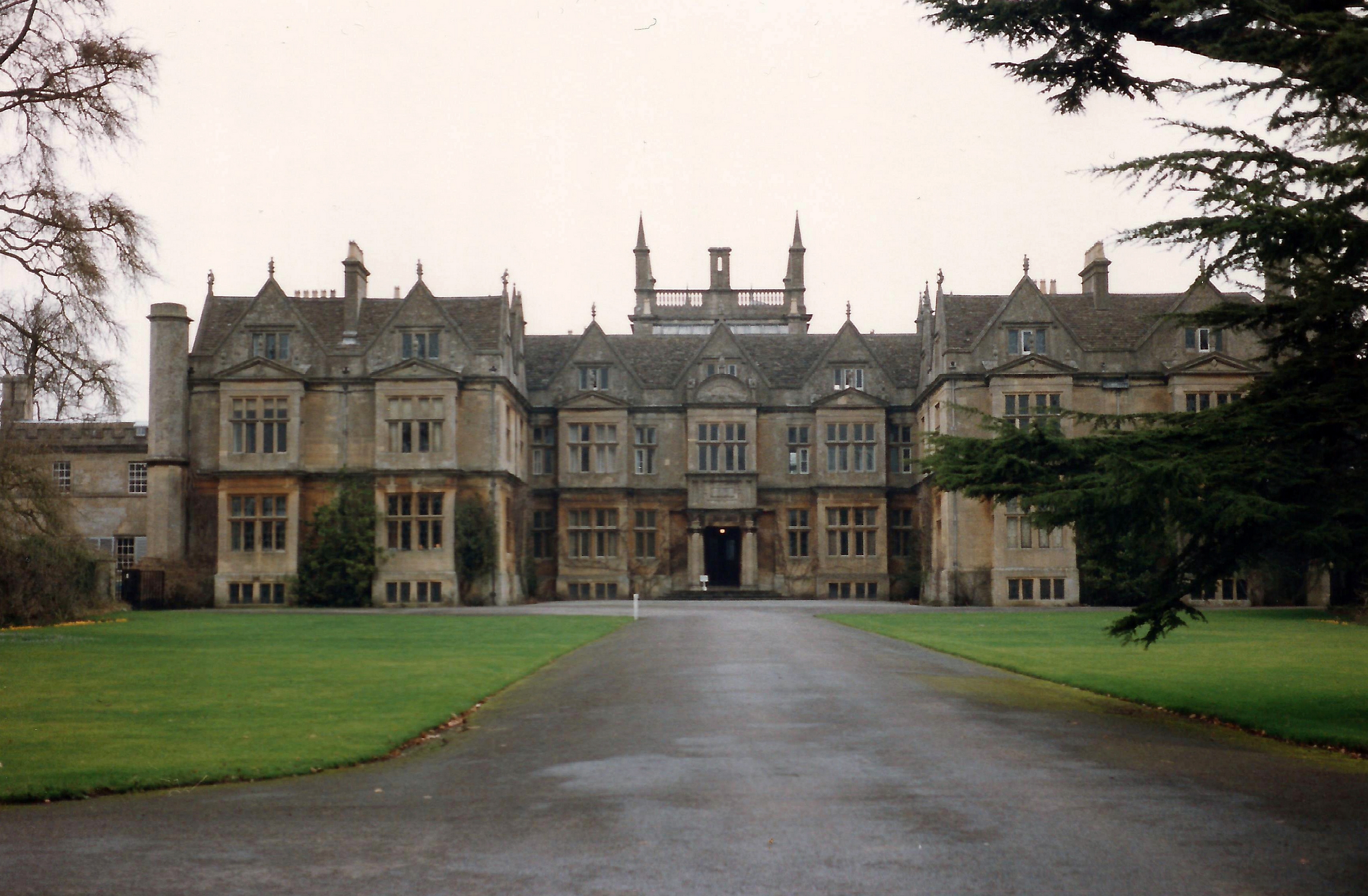
- South front of Corsham Court

- Location within Wiltshire
- 51°26′06″N 2°10′57″W
- Location: Corsham, Wiltshire, England

History
- Built: 1582
- Built for: Thomas Smythe

Listed Building – Grade I
- Designated: 20 December 1960
- Reference no.: 1022004

Corsham Court is a 16th-century country house in a park designed by Capability Brown. It is in the town of Corsham, 3 miles (5 km) west of Chippenham, Wiltshire, and is notable for its fine art collection, based on the nucleus of paintings inherited in 1757 by Paul Methuen from his uncle, Sir Paul Methuen, the diplomat. The house is Grade I listed and is the home of the present Baron Methuen, James Methuen-Campbell, the eighth generation of the Methuens to live there.

== Early history ==
Corsham was a royal manor in the days of the Saxon kings, reputed to have been a seat of Ethelred the Unready. After William the Conqueror, the manor continued to be passed down through the generations in the royal family. It often formed part of the dower of the Queens of England during the late 14th and early 15th centuries, becoming known as Corsham Reginae. During the 16th century, the manor went to two of Henry VIII's wives, namely Catherine of Aragon until 1536, and Katherine Parr until 1548.

During the reign of Elizabeth I the estate passed out of the royal family; the present house was built in 1582 by Thomas Smythe. The owner of Corsham Court in the mid-seventeenth century was Sir Edward Hungerford, the commander of the Parliamentarian New Model Army in Wiltshire; his wife, Lady Margaret Hungerford, built what came to be known as the Hungerford Almshouses in the centre of town.

An entrance archway was built to the south of the house c. 1700–20. The arch, in baroque style. is flanked by massive ashlar piers with ball finials.

== Methuen family ==
The house was bought in 1745 by Sir Paul Methuen for his cousin, also named Paul Methuen, whose grandson became Baron Methuen. The house remains the seat of the Methuen family.

In 1761–64, Lancelot 'Capability' Brown was commissioned to redesign and enlarge the house and landscape the park. Brown set the style of the present-day building by retaining the Elizabethan stables, the Riding School, and the great gabled front to the house, which he doubled in depth and provided gabled wings at either end of the house, creating the Picture Gallery and State Rooms in the east wing and a library and new kitchens in the west wing. The Picture Gallery was designed as a triple cube and has a coffered plasterwork ceiling over a high cove stuccoed in scrolls, designed by Brown and carried out by Thomas Stocking of Bristol (1763–66). The Long Gallery contains Italian Old Masters, with a notable marquetry commode and matching pair of candlestands by John Cobb (1772) and four pier glasses designed by Robert Adam (1770).

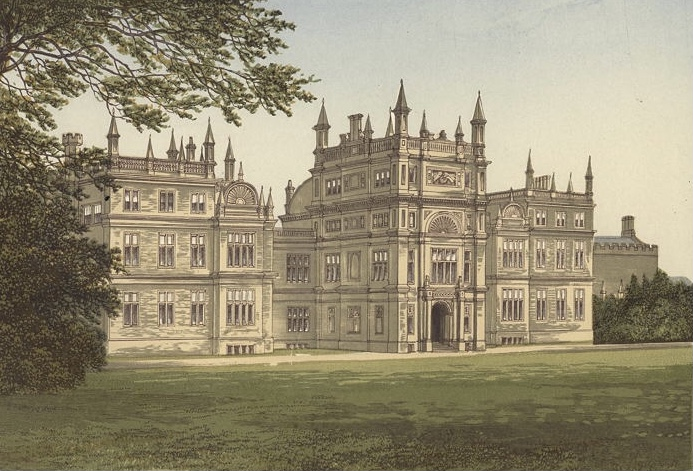
Corsham Court about 1880

Capability Brown also worked as a landscape architect for his commission at Corsham. His 1761 plan for laying out the park separated it from the pleasure grounds using a ha-ha (sunken fence) so that the view from the house would not be obstructed. Brown planned to enlarge the fish ponds to create a lake and constructed an orangery (neither of which survive) and built a Gothic Bath House (which does survive). He created a "Great Walk" stretching for a mile through clumps of trees. An ornamental arch was built so that the family and their guests could walk underneath the public right of way without having to cross it. Brown also planted screens of trees around the park to obscure roads and fields beyond, making the view more arcadian. The layout of grounds and gardens by Brown represents his most important commission after Blenheim Palace.

In 1795, Paul Cobb Methuen commissioned Humphry Repton to complete the landscape, left unfinished at Brown's death with the lake still to be completed, and in 1796 commissioned John Nash to completely remodel the north façade in Strawberry Hill Gothic style, beating the experienced James Wyatt for the commission. Nash further embellished other areas of Brown's external building works, including Brown's Gothic Bath House in the North Avenue, as well as reorganising the internal layout to form a grand hall and a library, at the centre of which is the large library table associated with a payment to Thomas Chippendale's partner Haig, in 1779. By 1808 much of Nash's work was replaced with a more solid structure, when it was discovered that he had used unseasoned timber in beams and joists; all of Nash's work at Corsham save the library was destroyed when it was remodelled by Thomas Bellamy (1798–1876) in 1844–49 during the ownership by Paul Methuen, 1st Baron Methuen, who was Member of Parliament for Wiltshire and North Wiltshire before he was raised to the peerage.

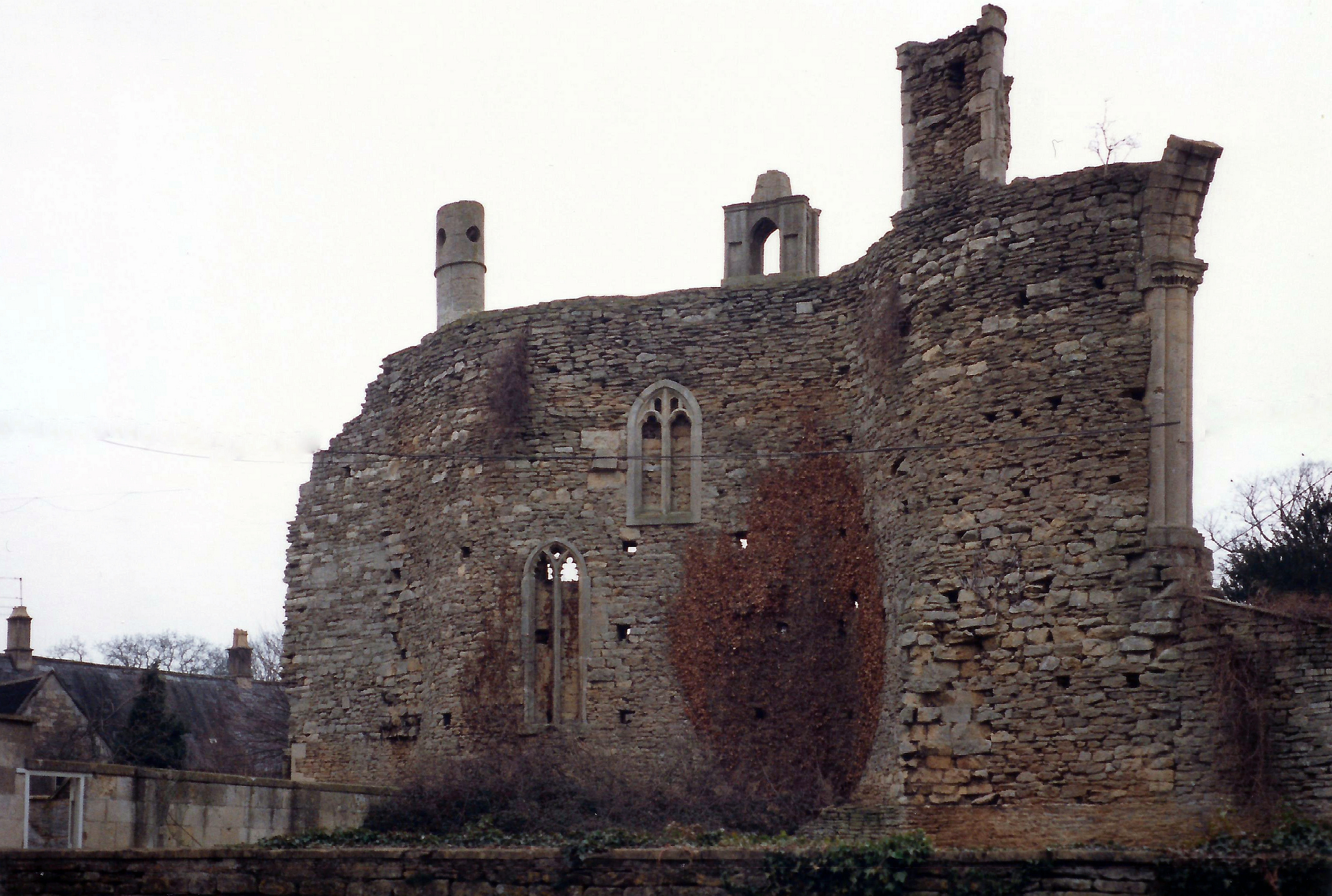
The Sham Ruin

Brown planned to include a 50,000 m^{2} lake. This lake, however, was not completed until some forty years later, by Repton, who formed his long working relationship with Nash at Corsham Court. They laid out avenues and planted the specimen trees, including American oaks, Quercus coccinea and Q phellos, and the magnificent oriental plane. The grounds also incorporate a folly ruin, built by Nash c. 1797, incorporating some medieval stonework and some material from the eighteenth-century Bath House built by Brown.

In 1960, the house and the Bath House were recorded as Grade I listed and the ensemble of stables, riding school and entrance arch as Grade II*. The park was recorded as Grade II* on the Register of Historic Parks and Gardens in 1987.

== Bath Academy of Art ==
Following the destruction of their premises during World War II, Bath Academy of Art (now Bath School of Art and Design and part of Bath Spa University) moved to Corsham Court in 1946 at the invitation of Paul Ayshford Methuen, 4th Baron Methuen, who himself was a distinguished painter and at the time president of the Royal West of England Academy. During its stay at Corsham until 1986, teachers at Bath Academy included many key figures of British art such as Kenneth Armitage, Terry Frost, Peter Lanyon, Adrian Heath, Bernard Meadows, William Scott and Howard Hodgkin.

In 2008, Bath Spa University returned to Corsham Court, opening facilities for research projects, postgraduate and research studios and study areas for artists and designers undertaking masters level study and doctorates.

== As film location ==
Some of the scenes from Stanley Kubrick's 1975 film Barry Lyndon were filmed at Corsham Court. In 1993 the house was a location for The Remains of the Day.
