= Lesser seed-finch =

The lesser seed-finches are two species of Thraupids in the genus Oryzoborus. The two have often been consider conspecific, but are increasingly treated as separate species:

- Chestnut-bellied seed-finch (Oryzoborus angolensis): South America east of the Andes.
- Thick-billed seed-finch (Oryzoborus funereus): Southern Mexico through Central America to north-western South America.
