= Bath House at Corsham Court =

The Bath House at Corsham Court
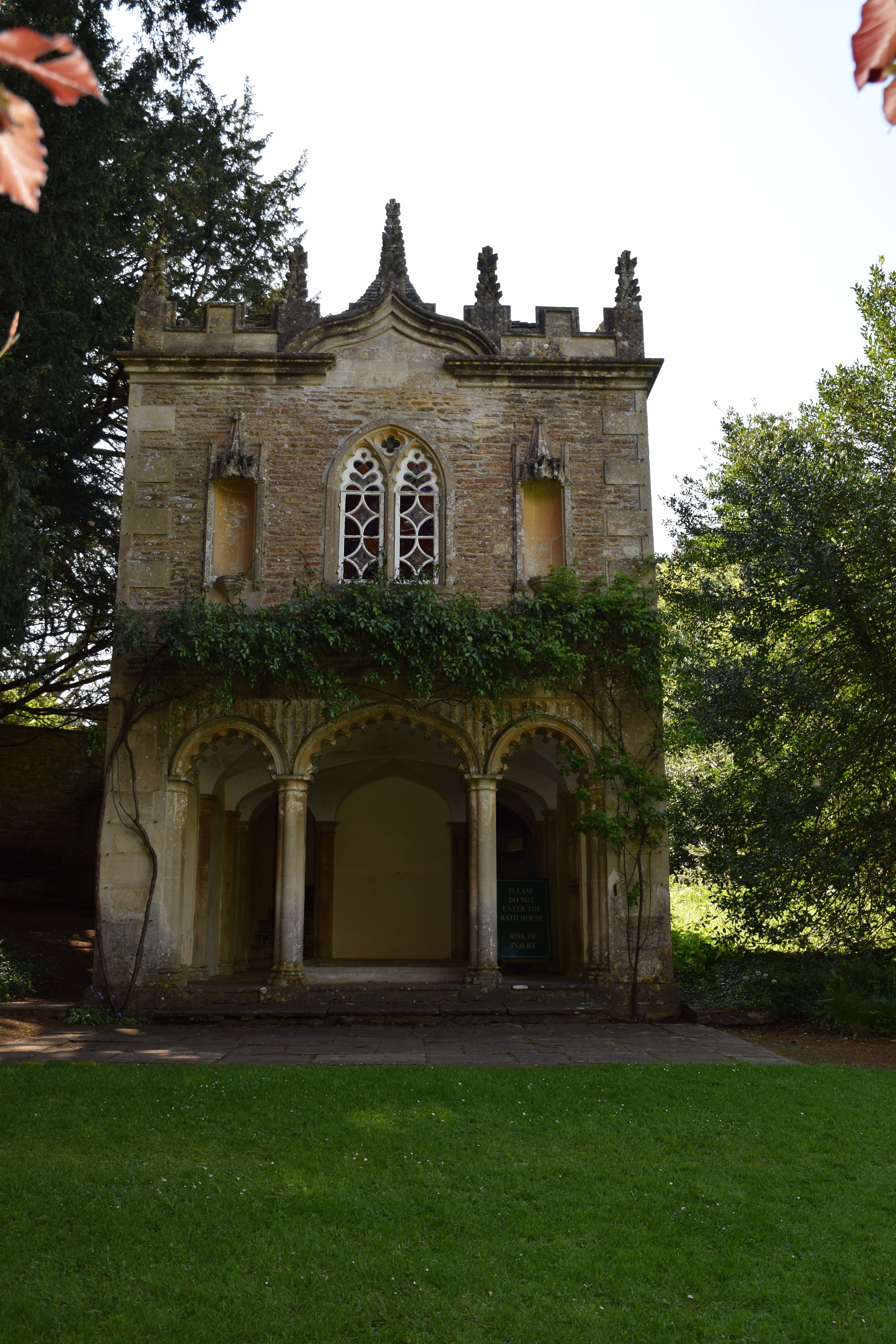
- "A charming little building" – Nikolaus Pevsner

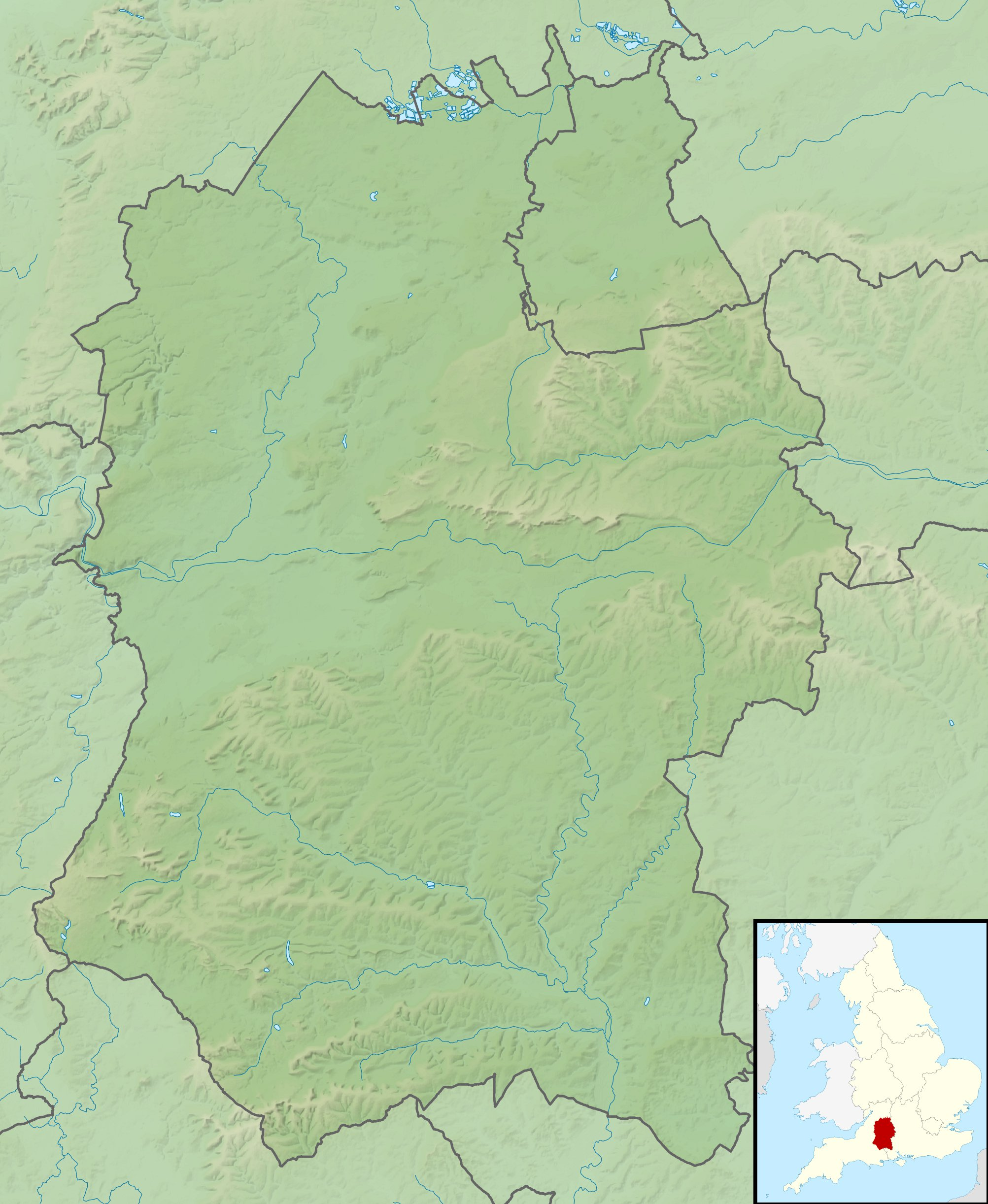
- Location within Wiltshire
- 51.4366°N 2.1827°W
- Type: Garden structure
- Location: Corsham, Wiltshire, England

History
- Built: 1761–1763

Site notes
- Architect: Capability Brown / later alterations by John Nash
- Architectural style: Gothick
- Governing body: Privately owned

Listed Building – Grade I
- Official name: The Bath House
- Designated: 20 December 1960
- Reference no.: 1182390

The Bath House at Corsham Court, Corsham, Wiltshire, England, is a garden structure dating from the mid-18th century. The combined work of two major English architects, it was designed by Capability Brown and subsequently remodelled by John Nash. It is a Grade I listed building.

== History ==
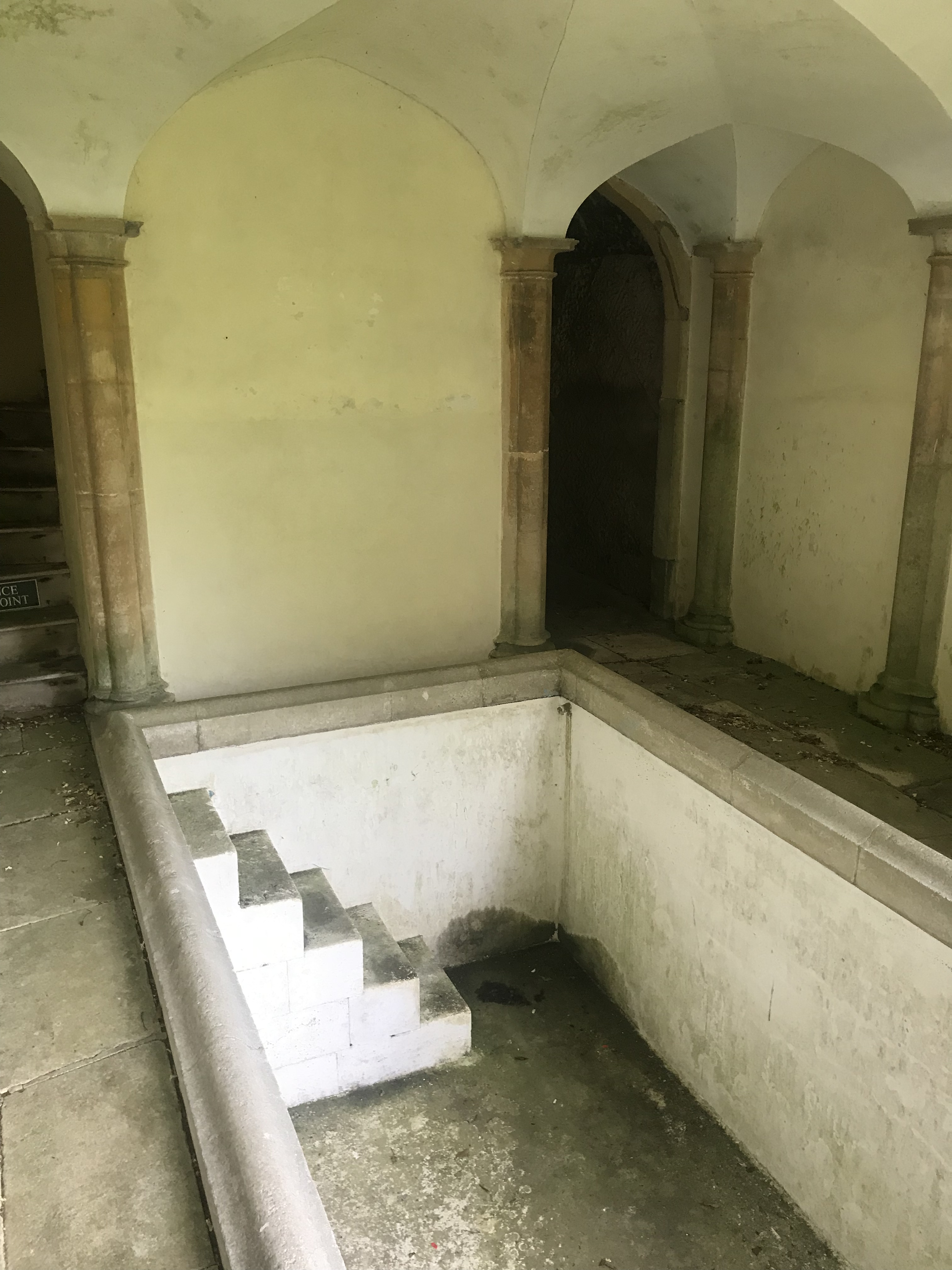
The bath

Corsham Court was built in 1582 by Thomas Smythe, a haberdasher and customs collector for the City of London. In 1745 the estate was bought by Paul Methuen, grandson of another wealthy cloth merchant. Dying unmarried in 1757, the house passed to his cousin, another Paul, who in 1761 employed Capability Brown to make major alterations to the court and to landscape the grounds. Brown's main focus was the reconstruction of the house, in particular the building of a picture gallery to accommodate the large number of paintings Methuen had inherited from his cousin, but during his time at Corsham, Brown undertook the construction of the bath house to the north of the court.

Between 1797 and 1802, the bath house was reconstructed by John Nash, who had been employed to make further modifications to the house by Paul Cobb Methuen. (Note: Mrs Arbuthnot described Nash after a visit to his home on the Isle of Wight in 1824: "Mr Nash is a very clever, odd, amusing man with a face like a monkey's".) Nash undertook the construction of a number of buildings in the grounds, mostly in Gothick styles, including the stables, the coach house, a cloistered dairy and a cottage by the lake. (Note: Brown had planned a lake at Corsham but his biographer, Thomas Hinde suggests that was not built until Humphry Repton undertook the construction when in partnership with Nash. More recent research undertaken by the Capability Brown Festival, established in 2016 to commemorate the tercentenary of Brown's birth, suggests he did construct a lake by amalgamating some existing medieval stew ponds but that this small, "pear-shaped" lake was subsequently filled in.) His reworking of the bath house was extensive, including the insertion of arches to the front of the building, reconstruction of the roof and renovation of the interior. Nash's remodelling saw the removal of some of Brown's earlier Gothick stonework, elements of which were incorporated into structures Nash was building elsewhere on the estate, including the Sham Ruin that stands to the front of the court.

== Architecture and description ==
The Georgian era saw a heightened interest in the physical and mental benefits of cold water bathing, and those that could afford to do so constructed bath houses, or plunge pools, on their estates. The physician John Floyer, who treated a young Samuel Johnson, wrote, "No part of Physick is more ancient than Cold Bathing, since we find many descripts of its good effects in our oldest authors...a Cold Regimen is proper to Cold Countries". The Corsham bath house is of two storeys, and open to the elements on its main frontage. Nikolaus Pevsner, in his Buildings of England, described it as "a charming little building..in a half-Gothic, half-Elizabethan style". The entrance front has three Gothic arches forming an open loggia. The sunken bathing pool is on the ground floor, and a changing room is above. A passage at the rear of the bath house leads through to the Bradford Gate, a genuinely medieval porch recovered from a demolished manor house in Bradford-on-Avon and erected at Corsham in 1967. The passageway ceiling is decorated with the remnants of patterns of moss and fir cones in a rustic style, which date from Browns's original construction. The bath house is a Grade I listed building.

== Sources ==
- Davis, Terence (1960). The Architecture of John Nash. London: Longacre Press Ltd. OCLC 902463199.
- Hinde, Thomas (1986). Capability Brown: The Story of a Master Gardener. London: Hutchinson. ISBN 9780091637408. OCLC 639102076.
- Mansbridge, Michael (1988). John Nash: A Complete Catalogue. London: Phaidon Press. ISBN 0-7148-2678-2.
- Pevsner, Nikolaus; Cherry, Bridget (2002). Wiltshire. The Buildings Of England. New Haven, US and London: Yale University Press. ISBN 9780300096590. OCLC 49298090.
