= Peter Burrell (1692–1756) =

British merchant and politician

Peter Burrell (6 August 1692 – 16 April 1756), of Langley Park, Beckenham, Kent, and Mark Lane, Fenchurch St., London, was a British merchant and politician who sat in the House of Commons from 1722 to 1756.

== Early life ==
Burrell was the son of Peter Burrell of Kelseys, Beckenham, Kent and his wife Isabella Merrik, second daughter of John Merrik, and older brother of Sir Merrik Burrell, 1st Baronet. He was educated at Merchant Taylors' School from 1704 to 1707. He became a merchant in trade with Portugal. On 14 March 1723, he married Amy Raymond, daughter of Hugh Raymond.

== Career ==
Burrell was returned as Member of Parliament (MP) for Haslemere in a contest at the 1722 British general election. He voted with the Government, except on the Excise Bill, which he opposed. He was sub-governor of the South Sea Company from 1724 to 1733 and a Director of Exchange Assurance from 1726 to 1738. He was returned unopposed at the 1727 British general election.

In 1730, he introduced a bill, which became law, allowing South Carolina to send rice direct to Southern Europe. He was High Sheriff of Kent for the year 1732 to 1733. At the 1734 British general election he was returned unopposed again. In 1737 he was one of the main speakers against Sir John Barnard's scheme for reducing the interest on the national debt.

In 1741, he supported a bill to regulate insurance. On the outbreak of war with Spain he secured a contract for remitting money for the forces in Jamaica, in partnershwith John Bristow, with whom he also shared similar contracts for Gibraltar and Minorca. He was returned again at the 1741 British general election.

After the fall of Walpole in 1742, the Jamaican contract was severely criticized by the secret committee set up by the House of Commons to inquire into Walpole's Administration. He was included in the Treasury list of underwriters of a loan in 1744, taking £90,000. He spoke for the Government in a debate on supply on 22 February 1744.

Burrell was defeated at Haslemere at the 1754 British general election. A further shock in 1754 was the earthquake at Lisbon which damaged his business there.

He was returned in a by-election on 9 April 1755 as MP for Dover on Newcastle's recommendation.

== Death and legacy ==
Burrell died on 16 April 1756, leaving four sons and two daughters. His oldest son Peter represented Launceston and Totnes in the British House of Commons, while his third son William was also returned for Haslemere and succeeded later his father-in-law as baronet.

Parliament of Great Britain
Preceded by The Viscount Blundell; Sir Nicholas Carew	Member of Parliament for Haslemere; 1722 – 1754; With: James Edward Oglethorpe	Succeeded by James More Molyneux; Philip Carteret Webb
Preceded by William Cayley; Lord George Sackville	Member of Parliament for Dover; 1755–1756; With: Lord George Sackville	Succeeded by Hugh Valence Jones; Lord George Sackville
