= Thomas More Molyneux =

British Army officer and politician

Thomas More Molyneux (c. 1724–1776), was a British Army officer and politician who sat in the House of Commons between 1759 and 1776.

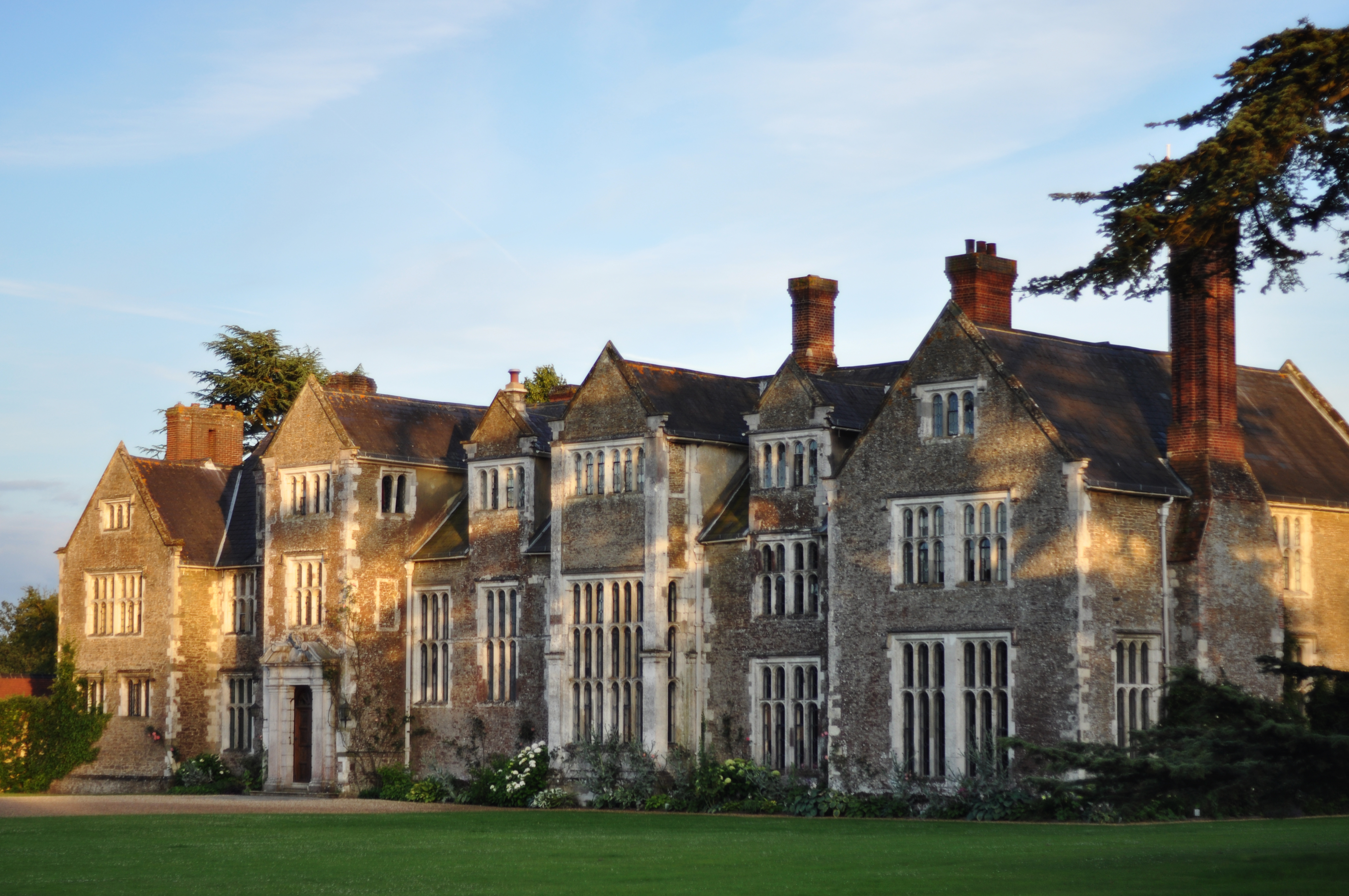
Loseley Park

== Early life ==
Molyneux was the son of Sir William Molyneux of Loseley Park and his wife Cassandra Cornwallis, daughter of Thomas Cornwallis of Abermarlais, Carmarthenshire. He matriculated at Wadham College, Oxford on 8 April 1742, aged 17 and was awarded BA in 1745. In 1747, he joined the army and was an Ensign in the 3rd Foot Guards. He was then lieutenant and captain in 1753 and served in Germany during the Seven Years' War.

== Parliamentary career ==
Molyneux succeeded his brother James as Member of Parliament for Haslemere being elected unopposed in a by-election in 1759. On his father's death in 1760 he inherited the Loseley estate. In the 1761 general election he and Philip Carteret Webb, the other sitting member at Haslemere, won a serious contest against candidates supported the Burrell family. Molyneux was described as a country gentleman, generally well inclined to Government, but retaining his independence. He was still a serving officer and became captain and lieutenant-colonel in 1761, eventually becoming colonel in 1773. Before the general election of 1768, with Webb apparently retiring, Molyneux joined the Burrells to contest the seat and they were successful against third parties at the election. The agreement continued and in the 1774 general election he again contested the borough jointly with the Burrells. He does not appear to have spoken in the Parliaments of 1768 and 1774.

== Death and legacy ==
Molyneux died unmarried on 3 October 1776. A clergyman wrote of him that he was one of the few original men in the world with the comment “Politeness has the good effect of hiding what is offensive in us, but it covers at the same time many entertaining oddities, and he had more of them than any of our neighbours.” The Loseley estate passed to his sisters Cassandra and Jane who also died childless. The estate then passed to his illegitimate son, James.

Parliament of Great Britain
Preceded by James More Molyneux; Philip Carteret Webb	Member of Parliament for Haslemere; 1759 – 1776; With: Philip Carteret Webb 1759-1768; William Burrell 1768-1774; Sir Merrick Burrell, Bt 1774-1776	Succeeded by Peter Burrell; Sir Merrick Burrell, Bt
