= N. namaquensis =

N. namaquensis may refer to:

- Namazonurus namaquensis, a species of lizard
- Namiscophus namaquensis, a species of crabronid wasp
- Nenax namaquensis, a species of plant
- Neomelambrotus namaquensis, a species of owlfly
- Nothomydas namaquensis, a species of Mydas fly
