= Methven =

Methven or Methvin may refer to:

== Places ==
- Methven, New Zealand, in the Canterbury region of New Zealand
- Methven, Perth and Kinross, village in Scotland

== People ==
- Methven (surname)

== See also ==
- Methuen (disambiguation)
- Battle of Methven, fought by Robert the Bruce
