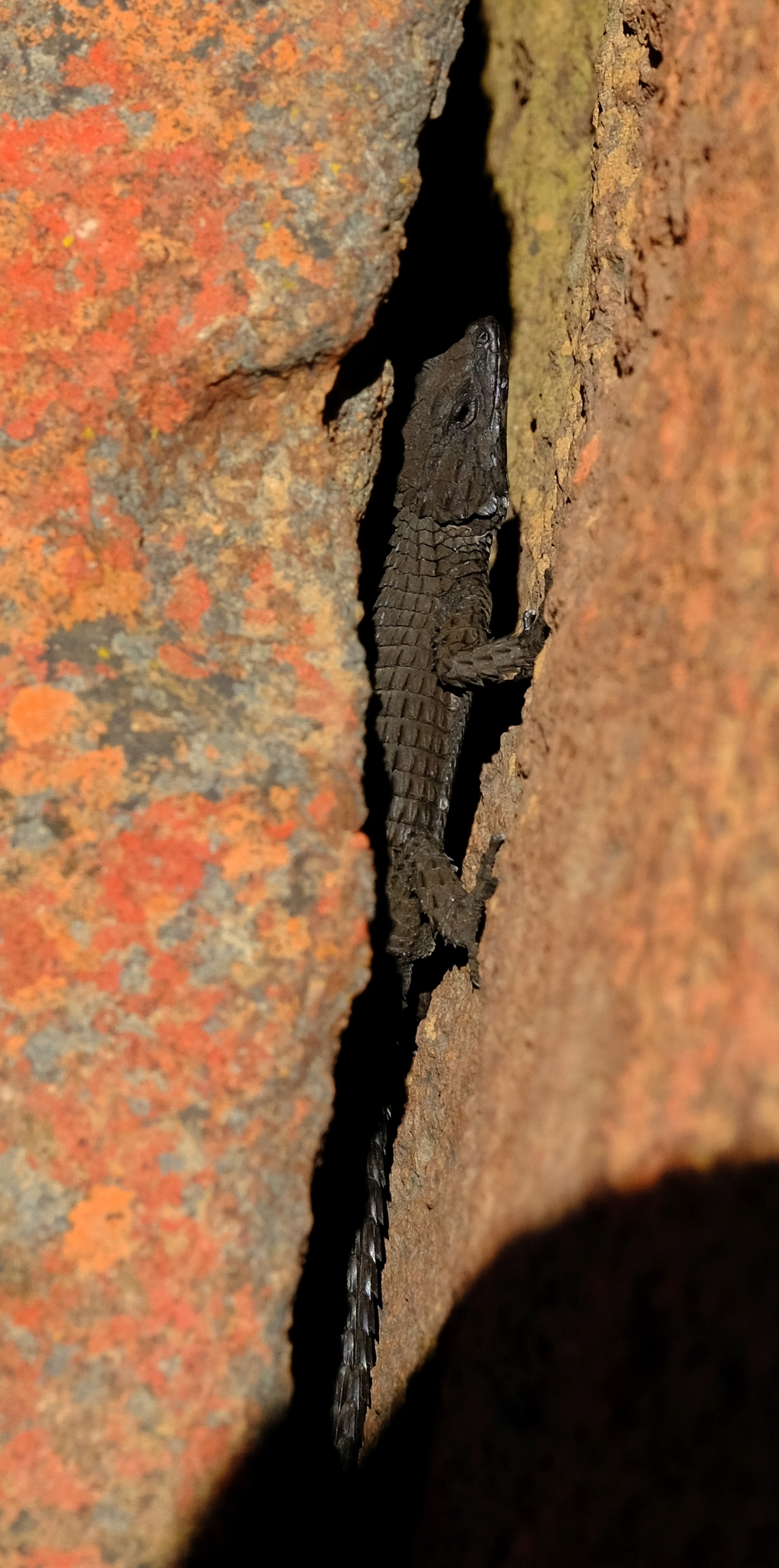
- Namazonurus peersi

Scientific classification
- Domain: Eukaryota
- Kingdom: Animalia
- Phylum: Chordata
- Class: Reptilia
- Order: Squamata
- Family: Cordylidae
- Genus: Namazonurus; Stanley et al., 2011

= Namazonurus =

Genus of lizards

Namazonurus, is a genus of lizards, commonly known as Namaqua girdled lizards, in the family Cordylidae. The genus contains five species, which are endemic to southern Africa, and feed on insects and small vertebrates.

== Species ==
The following species are recognized as being valid.

- Namazonurus campbelli (V. FitzSimons, 1938)
- Namazonurus lawrenci (V. FitzSimons, 1939)
- Namazonurus namaquensis (Methuen & Hewitt, 1914)
- Namazonurus peersi (Hewitt, 1932)
- Namazonurus pustulatus (W. Peters, 1862)

Nota bene: A binomial authority in parentheses indicates that the species was originally described in a genus other than Namazonurus.
