= James More Molyneux =

British politician

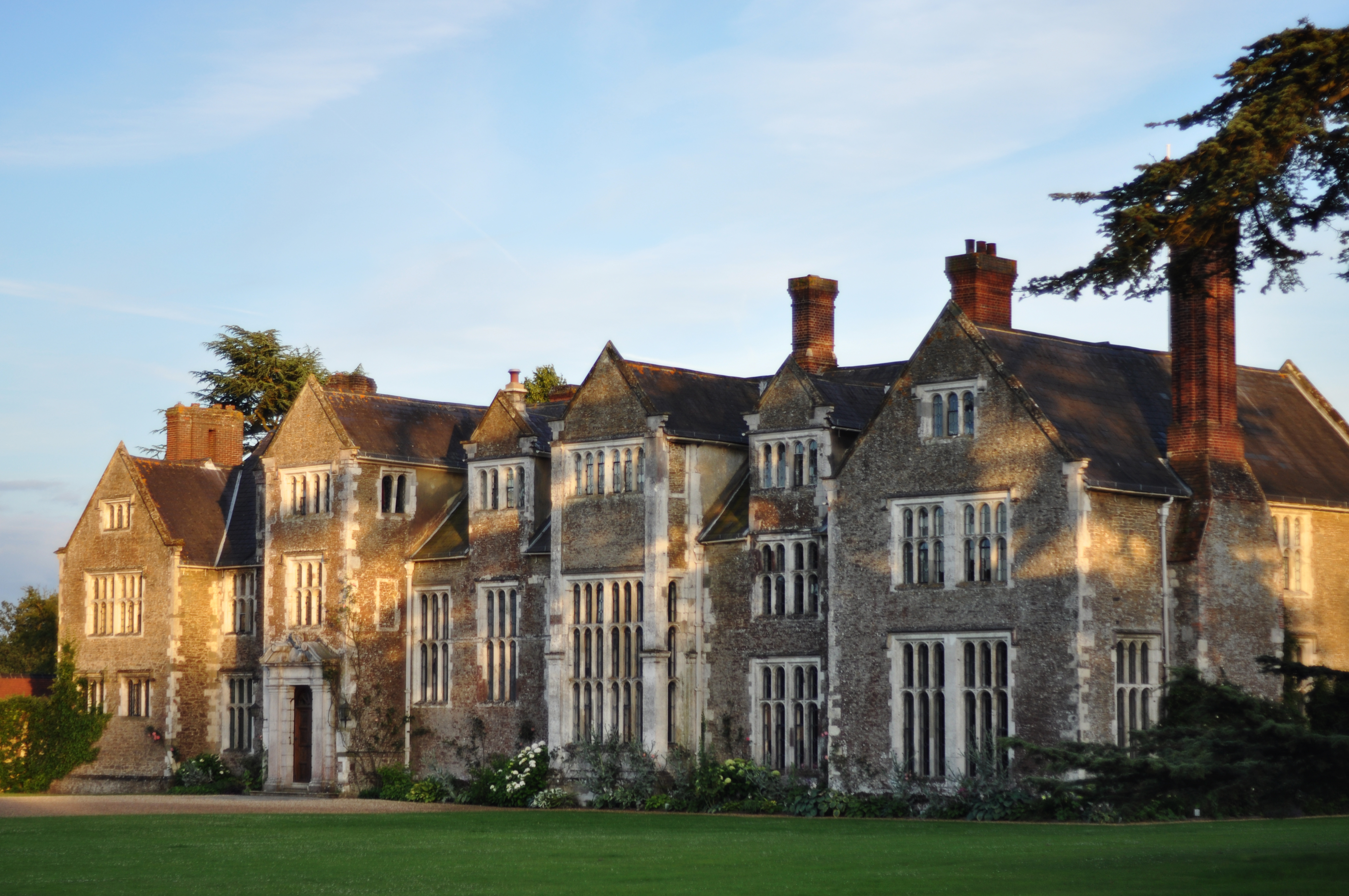
Loseley Park, the family seat in Surrey

James More Molyneux (c. 1723–1759), was a British politician who sat in the House of Commons between 1754 and 1759.

Molyneux was the son of Sir More Molyneux of Loseley Park and his wife Cassandra Cornwallis, daughter of Thomas Cornwallis of Abermarlais, Carmarthenshire. He matriculated at Wadham College, Oxford on 27 September 1742, aged 19. He married Margaret Sherard, daughter of Robert Sherard of Carcolston, Nottinghamshire on 11 October 1753.

The Molyneux family had inherited the manor of Haslemere which gave them a strong interest in the borough and the right to appoint the returning officer. They had not exercised their interest for many years, but perhaps Molyneux's marriage allowed him to revive it at the 1754 general election. He was returned then as Member of Parliament for Haslemere.

Molyneux predeceased his father and died without issue on 24 June 1759. His brother Thomas stepped into his seat at Haslemere. The Loseley estate passed to his brother on the death of their father in 1760.

A daughter, Henrietta, married Ross Lowis Mangles, VC.

Parliament of Great Britain
| Preceded by James Oglethorpe; Peter Burrell | Member of Parliament for Haslemere; 1754 – 1759; With: Philip Carteret Webb | Succeeded by Thomas More Molyneux; Philip Carteret Webb |
