= Methuen (surname) =

Methuen is a surname. Notable people with the surname include:

- Sir Algernon Methuen (1856–1924), founder of Methuen & Co. Ltd.
- Anthony Methuen, 5th Baron Methuen (1891–1975), British soldier, architect and peer
- Charlotte Methuen (born 1964), British Anglican priest and historian
- John Methuen (disambiguation)
- Paul Methuen (disambiguation), various British people, including politicians and scientists
