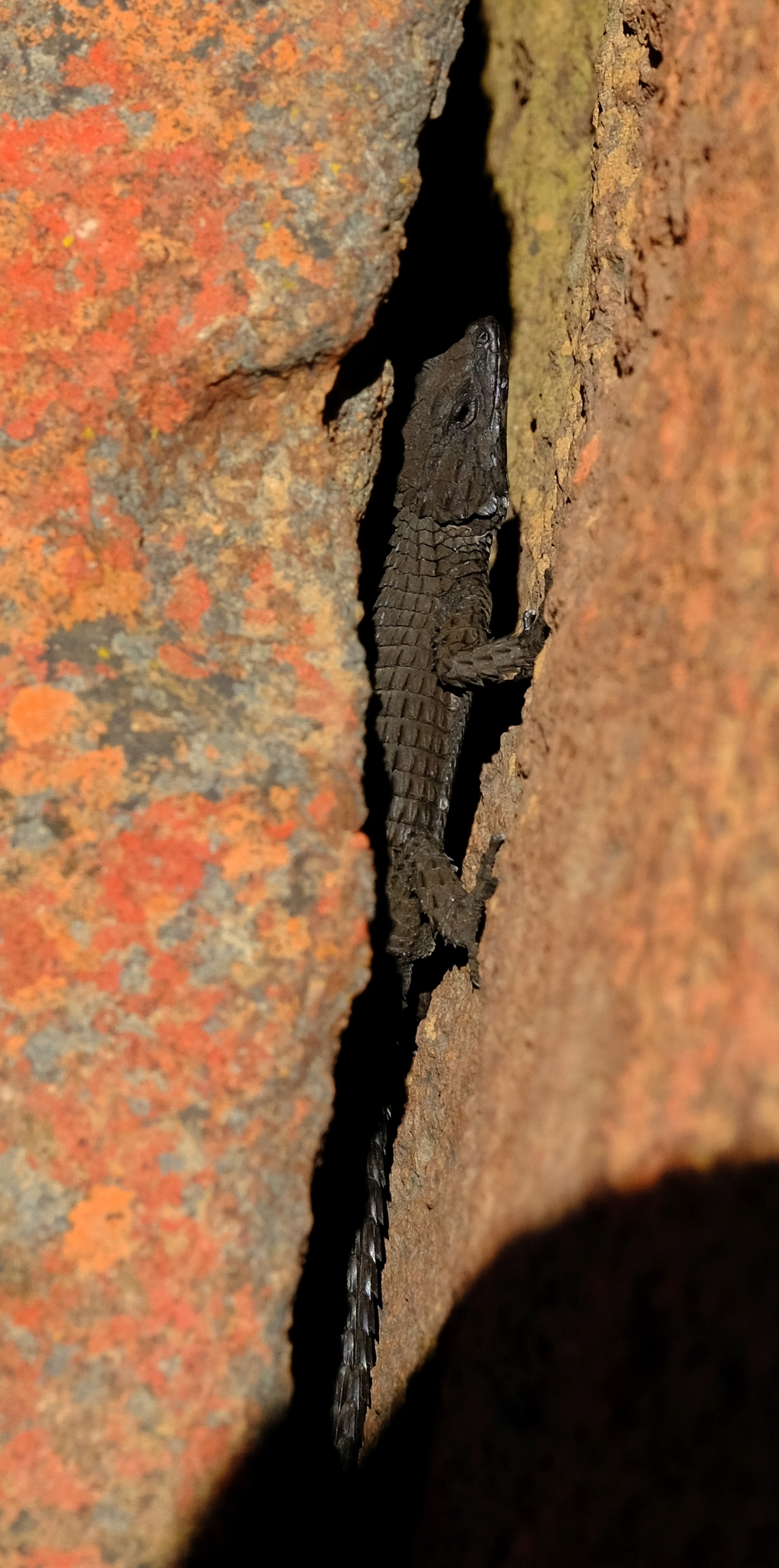

Conservation status
- Least Concern (IUCN 3.1)

Scientific classification
- Kingdom: Animalia
- Phylum: Chordata
- Class: Reptilia
- Order: Squamata
- Family: Cordylidae
- Genus: Namazonurus
- Species: N. peersi

Binomial name
- Namazonurus peersi (Hewitt, 1932)

Synonyms
- Zonurus peersi Hewitt, 1932; Cordylus peersi — V. FitzSimons, 1943; Namazonurus peersi — Stanley et al., 2011

= Namazonurus peersi =

Species of lizard

Namazonurus peersi is a species of small, spiny lizard in the family Cordylidae. The species is endemic to South Africa.

== Common names ==
Common names for Namazonurus peersi include Hewitt's spiny-tailed lizard, Peers' girdled lizard, Peers's girdled lizard, Peers' Nama lizard, and Peers's Nama lizard.

== Etymology ==
The specific name, peersi, is in honor of either Victor Peers or his son Bertram "Bertie" Peers, both of whom were amateur archaeologists in South Africa in the 1920s.

== Geographic range ==
Within South Africa, Namazonurus peersi is found in Northern Cape province and Western Cape province, in the area also known as Little Namaqualand.

== Habitat ==
The preferred natural habitats of Namazonurus peersi are rocky areas and shrubland.

== Description ==
Adults of Namazonurus peersi have a snout-to-vent length (SVL) of 7.5–8.5 cm (3.0–3.3 in). The head is triangular, and both the head and the body are flattened. Dorsally, N. peersi is black. Ventrally, it is very dark purple-brown, except for the femoral pores, which are pale yellow.

== Behavior ==
Namazonurus peersi is terrestrial.

== Diet ==
Namazonurus peersi preys upon caterpillars and other large insects.

== Reproduction ==
Namazonurus peersi is ovoviviparous.
