= Methven (surname) =

Methven is a surname. Notable people with the surname include:

- Charlie Methven (born 1976), English public relations consultant, journalist and publisher
- Colin Methven (born 1955), Scottish footballer
- Henry Stewart, 1st Lord Methven (c. 1495–1552), third husband of Margaret Tudor
- Jessie C. Methven (1854–1917), Scottish suffragette
- Jimmy Methven (1868–1953), Scottish footballer
- Robert Methven Petrie (1906–1966), Canadian astronomer
- Tom Methven, New Zealand footballer

== See also ==
- Methuen (surname)
