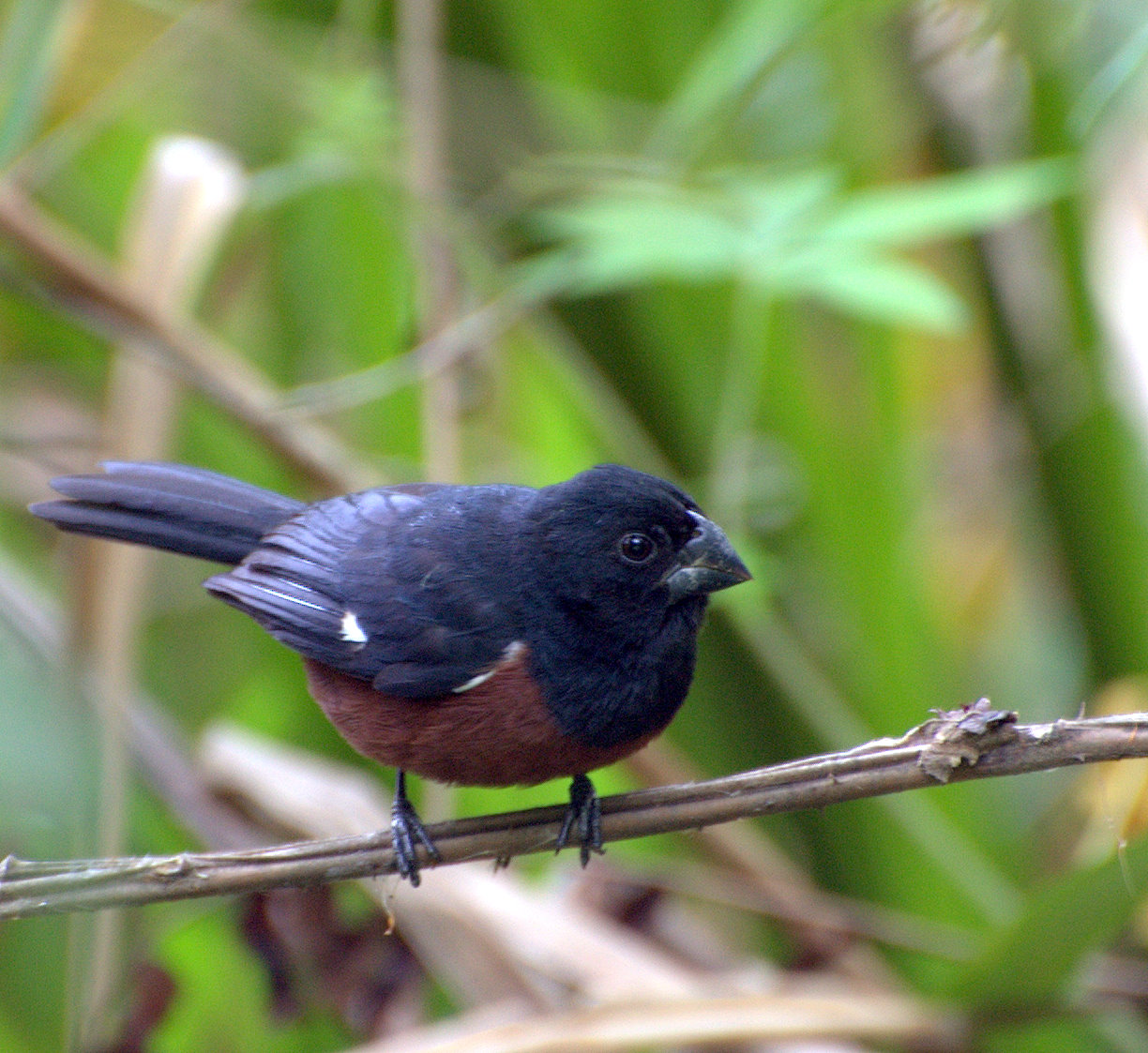
- Male
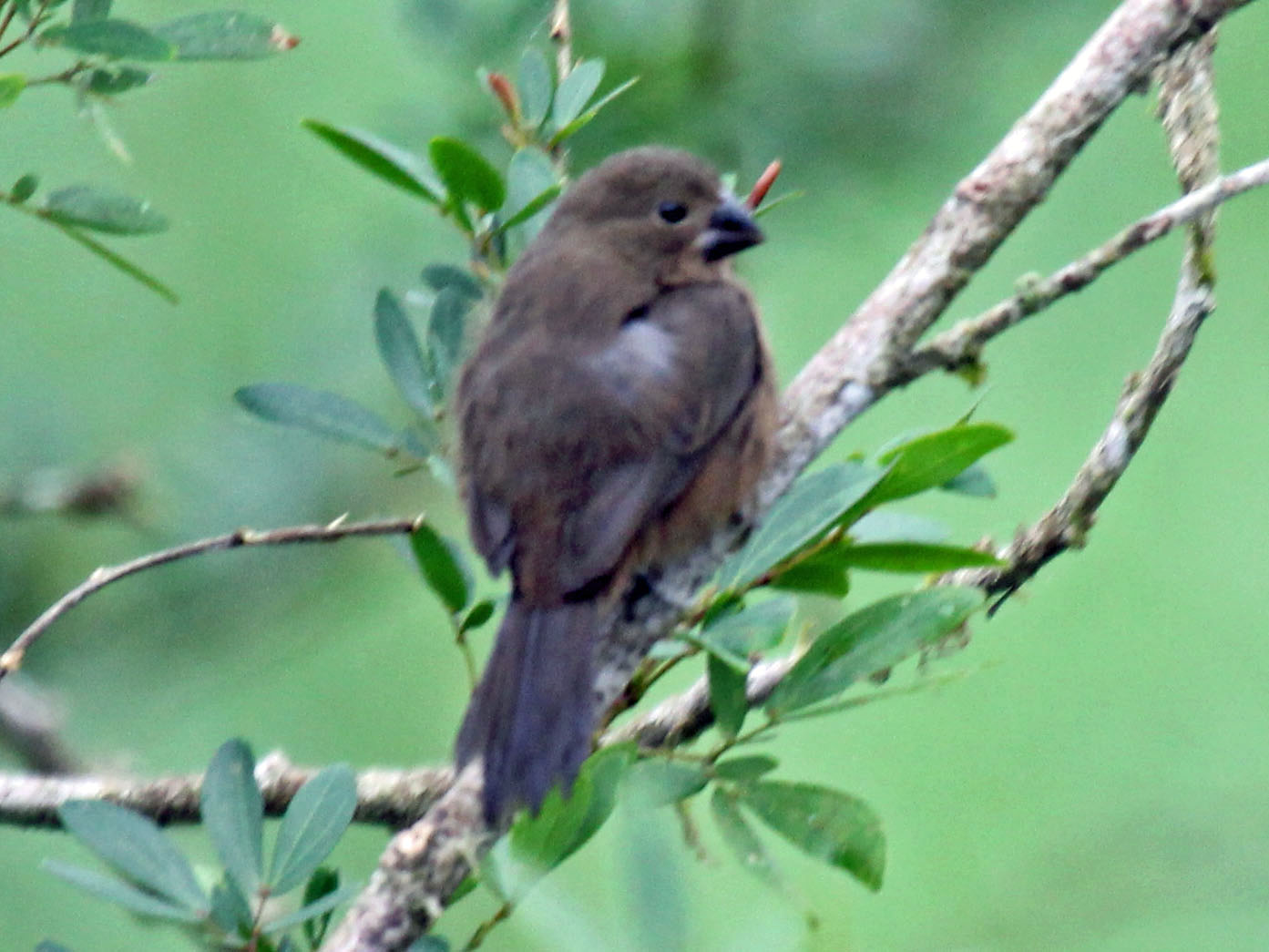
- Female

Conservation status
- Least Concern (IUCN 3.1)

Scientific classification
- Kingdom: Animalia
- Phylum: Chordata
- Class: Aves
- Order: Passeriformes
- Family: Thraupidae
- Genus: Sporophila
- Species: S. angolensis

Binomial name
- Sporophila angolensis (Linnaeus, 1766)

Synonyms
- Loxia angolensis (protonym); Oryzoborus angolensis

= Chestnut-bellied seed finch =

Species of bird

The chestnut-bellied seed finch (Sporophila angolensis) is a species of bird in the family Thraupidae, the tanagers and allies. It is found in every mainland South American country except Chile and Uruguay. It formerly was found on Trinidad but has been extirpated.

== Taxonomy and systematics ==
The chestnut-bellied seed finch was formally described by the Swedish naturalist Carl Linnaeus in 1766 in the twelfth edition of his Systema Naturae under the binomial name Loxia angolensis. Linnaeus based his description on "The Black Gros-Beak" that had been described and illustrated in 1764 by the English naturalist George Edwards. Edwards' illustration was from a live bird belonging to the barrister Philip Carteret Webb. Edwards mistakenly believed that the bird had come from Angola, leading to its specific epithet angolensis. The chestnut-bellied seed finch does not occur there and the type locality has been corrected to eastern Brazil.

By 1938 the chestnut-bellied seed finch had been reassigned to genus Oryzoborus, which at the time was a member of the family Fringillidae. By 1970 the genus had been assigned to the family Emberizidae. Based on studies published between 1988 and 2011, beginning in 2012 Oryzoborus was moved to the tanager family Thraupidae. In 2014 taxonomic systems began merging Oryzoborus into Sporophila, a genus that had been introduced by the German ornithologist Jean Cabanis in 1844.

At times the thick-billed seed finch has been treated as conspecific with the chestnut-bellied seed finch with the latter's binomial S. angolensis and the English name "lesser seed finch". They hybridize in the small area where their ranges overlap in Colombia.

The chestnut-bellied seed finch has two subspecies, the nominate S. a. angolensis (Linnaeus, 1766) and S. a. torrida (Scopoli).

== Description ==
The chestnut-bellied seed finch is 10.6 to 12.4 cm (4.2 to 4.9 in) long and weighs 11.4 to 14.5 g (0.40 to 0.51 oz). It has a short bill with a very deep base and a rounded culmen. The species is sexually dimorphic. Adult males of both subspecies have a black head, throat, upperparts, and tail. Their wings are black with white underwing coverts and white bases on the primaries that show as a small patch on the closed wing. Their breast, belly, flanks, and undertail coverts are deep chestnut and their thighs are black. Adult females of both subspecies have a warm brown head, upperparts, and tail. Their wings are warm brown with white underwing coverts; they lack the male's white primary patch. Their chin is almost white, their breast cinnamon, and the rest of their underparts a paler cinnamon. Subspecies S. a. torrida has the same plumage as the nominate but is smaller with a smaller bill and shorter tail. Both sexes of both subspecies have a black iris. Males have a black bill and legs and females a blackish bill and dusky legs.

== Distribution and habitat ==
Subspecies S. a. torrida of the chestnut-bellied seed finch is the more northerly of the two. It is found from approximately the southeastern half of Colombia south through eastern Ecuador and eastern Peru. From Colombia and Peru its range continues east into Venezuela, the Guianas, and Brazil. In Venezuela it is found on both sides of the Andes, along the Coastal Range, and in most of Amazonas, Bolívar, and Delta Amacuro states. In Brazil it is found south to Mato Grosso, Goiás, Tocantins, and Piauí. The subspecies formerly was found on Trinidad but has been extirpated from the island. The nominate subspecies is found in the rest of Brazil with the exception of the southern half of Rio Grande do Sul, with its range continuing into northern and eastern Bolivia, eastern Paraguay, and far northeastern Argentina's Misiones Province.

The chestnut-bellied seed finch inhabits shrubby and grassy landscapes on the edges and clearings of forest and woodland and also secondary forest. In elevation it is found from sea level to 1,500 m (4,900 ft) in Brazil. North of the Orinoco River in Venezuela it ranges from sea level to 1,200 m (3,900 ft) and to 1,400 m (4,600 ft) south of it. It reaches 800 m (2,600 ft) in Colombia, 900 m (3,000 ft) in Ecuador, and 1,500 m (4,900 ft) in Peru.

== Behavior ==
=== Movement ===
The chestnut-bellied seed finch is a sedentary year-round resident.

=== Feeding ===
The chestnut-bellied seed finch feeds on seeds and insects. At a study site in Guyana it fed almost exclusively on the seeds of the sedge Scleria pratensis. It took most while clinging to the stalk and some while clinging to an adjacent one. It sometimes foraged in small flocks that included other seed-eating species.

=== Breeding ===
The chestnut-bellied seed finch breeds between February and August in the northern part of its range and between September and February in the southern part. Its nest is a deep cup made from grasses and vines and is usually built not far above the ground. The usual clutch is two eggs though three are known. Nothing else is known about the species' breeding biology.

=== Vocalization ===
The chestnut-bellied seed finch's song is somewhat variable and described in general as "a fairly long series of musical whistled notes, interspersed with chattering notes, and often ending in trills". Its call is "a single liquid whistle".

== Status ==
The IUCN has assessed the chestnut-bellied seed finch as being of Least Concern. It has an extremely large range; its population size is not known but is believed to be increasing. No immediate threats have been identified. It is considered "fairly common" in Colombia, "fairly common and widespread" in Peru, "rather local" north of the Orinoco in Venezuela and "common" in eastern Bolívar, "frequent to uncommon" in most of Brazil, and "uncommon to rare" in Rio Grande do Sul and Santa Catarina states.
