= Anthony Methuen, 5th Baron Methuen =

British soldier, architect and peer

Captain Anthony Paul Methuen, 5th Baron Methuen (26 June 1891 – 21 June 1975), was a British soldier, architect and peer.

Methuen, born in Wiltshire, was the second son of Field Marshal Paul Methuen, 3rd Baron Methuen, by his wife Mary Ethel Sanford, daughter of William Ayshford Sanford, of Nynehead Court, Somerset. He was educated at Wellington College, Berkshire and New College, Oxford.

He was wounded in the First World War while serving as a captain in the Scots Guards. He was a chartered architect. He succeeded in the barony in January 1974, aged 82, on the death of his elder brother.

Lord Methuen married Grace Durning Holt, the eldest daughter of Sir Richard Durning Holt, 1st Baronet, in 1920. They had four children:

- Anthony Richard Paul Methuen (14 May 1923 – 8 December 1934).
- Anthony John Methuen, 6th Baron Methuen (26 October 1925 – 24 August 1994).
- Hon. Elizabeth Penelope Methuen (4 July 1928 – 13 July 2017).
- Robert Alexander Holt Methuen, 7th Baron Methuen (22 July 1931 – 9 July 2014).

Lady Methuen died in August 1972, aged 74. Lord Methuen died in June 1975, aged 83, and was succeeded by his second but eldest surviving son, John.

== Arms ==
Coat of arms of Anthony Methuen, 5th Baron Methuen
Escutcheon Argent three wolves' heads erased Proper on the breast of an eagle with two heads displayed Sable. Supporters On either side two fiery lynxes reguardant Proper collared having a line passing between their forelegs reflexed over their backs Or. Motto Virtus Invidiae Scopus

Peerage of the United Kingdom
Preceded by Paul Ayshford Methuen	Baron Methuen; 1974–1975	Succeeded by Anthony John Methuen
