= John Methuen =

John Methuen may refer to:

- John Methuen (priest), Anglican priest
- John Methuen (diplomat), English diplomat, judge and member of parliament
- John Methuen, 6th Baron Methuen, British peer
