= Lawrence's girdled lizard =

Conservation status
- Least Concern (IUCN 3.1)

Scientific classification
- Kingdom: Animalia
- Phylum: Chordata
- Class: Reptilia
- Order: Squamata
- Family: Cordylidae
- Genus: Namazonurus
- Species: N. lawrenci

Binomial name
- Namazonurus lawrenci (V. FitzSimons, 1939)

Synonyms
- Zonurus lawrenci V. FitzSimons, 1939; Cordylus lawrenci — V. FitzSimons, 1943; Cordylus cordylus lawrenci — Loveridge, 1944; Cordylus lawrenci — Branch, 1988; Namazonurus lawrenci — Stanley et al., 2011

Species of lizard

Lawrence's girdled lizard (Namazonurus lawrenci) is a species of lizard in the family Cordylidae. The species is endemic to South Africa.

== Etymology ==
The specific name, lawrenci, is in honor of South African entomologist Reginald Frederick Lawrence.

== Description ==
N. lawrencei is small, thin, and flat for its genus. Dorsally, it is dark brown. Ventrally, it is brownish gray to whitish. Adults usually have a snout-to-vent length (SVL) of 6.5–7.0 cm (2.6–2.8 in).

== Geographic range ==
N. lawrenci is found in the Richtersveld in the province of Northern Cape, South Africa.

== Habitat ==
The preferred natural habitats of N. lawrenci are rocky areas and shrubland, at altitudes of 250–1,375 m (820–4,511 ft).

== Reproduction ==
N. lawrenci is ovoviviparous.
