= Merrik Burrell =

British politician

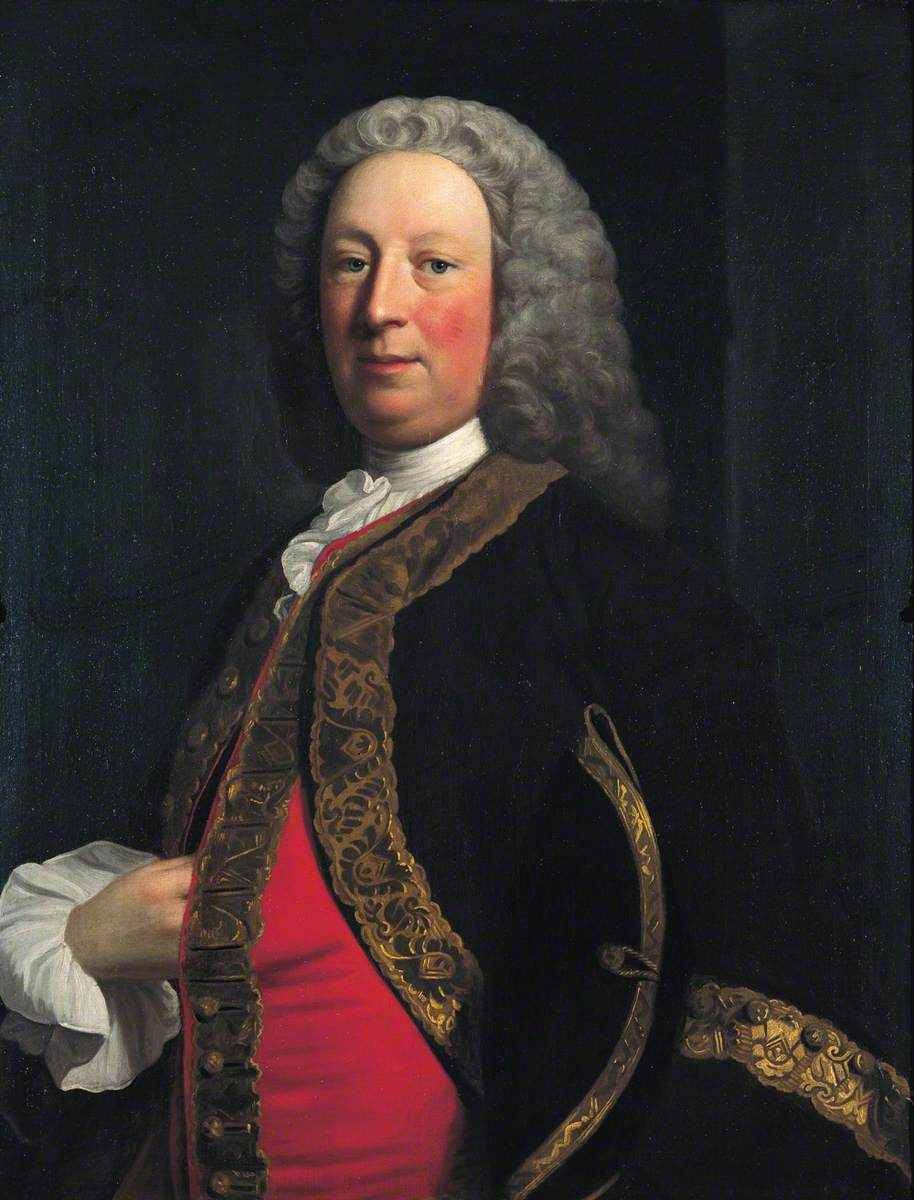
Sir Merrik Burrell (1699–1787), Bt, Governor of the Bank of England (1758–1760), painting by Allan Ramsay.

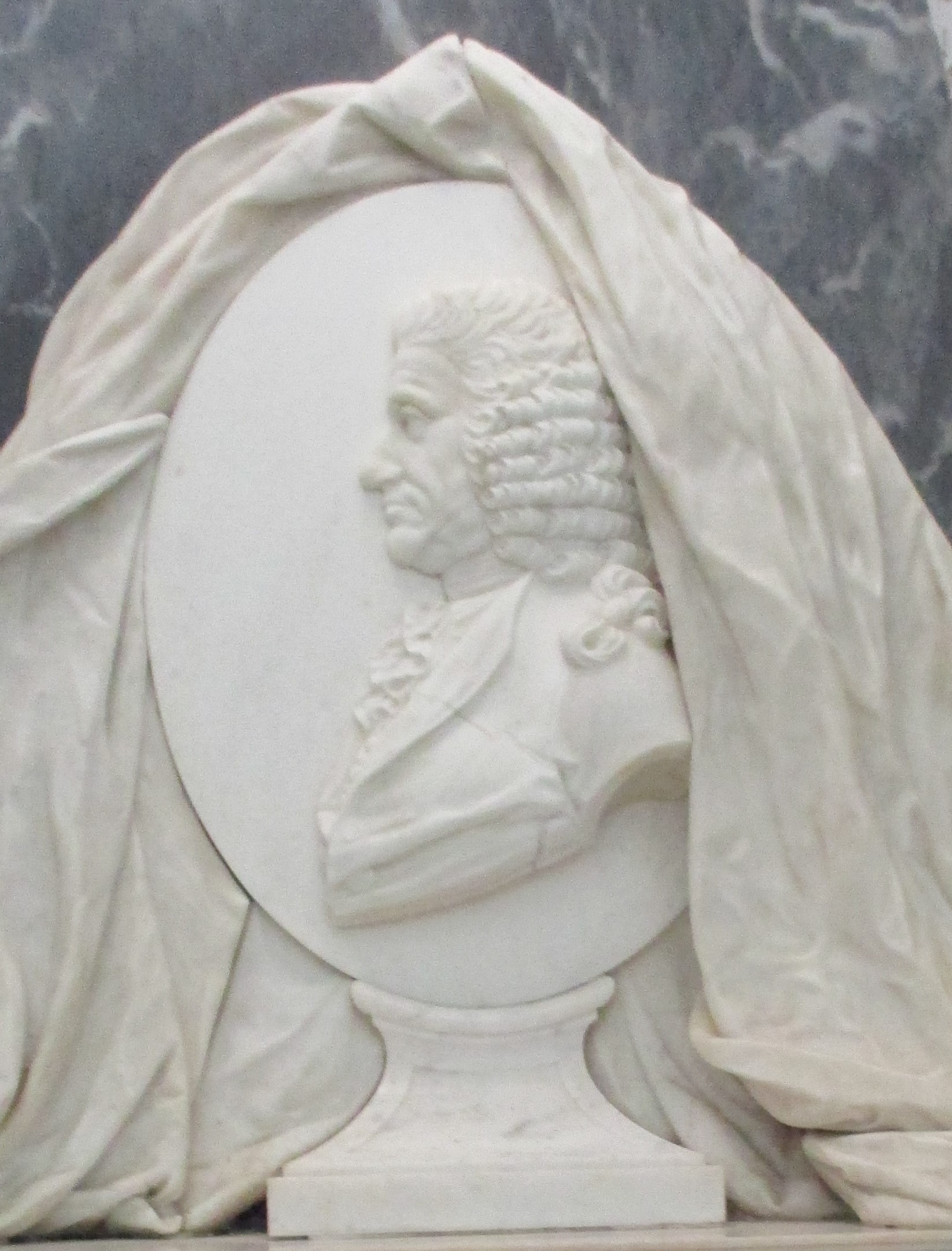
Detail of the monument to Merrik Burrell in St George's Church, West Grinstead

Sir Merrik Burrell, 1st Baronet (3 April 1699 – 6 April 1787) was a British politician.

He was the second son of Peter Burrell and his wife, Isabella Merrik, daughter of John Merrik. He bought West Grinstead Park in 1744.

Burrell entered the British House of Commons for Great Marlow in 1747, sat for it until 1754 and was subsequently returned for Grampound, which he represented until 1768.

He was elected for Haslemere in 1774 and stood then for Great Bedwyn, becoming its representative until 1784.

Burrell was governor of the Bank of England from 1758 to 1760, and, on 15 July 1766, he was created a baronet, of West Grinstead Park in the County of Sussex, with a special remainder to the heirs male of his older brother Peter. Burrell's tenure as Governor occurred during the Bengal bubble (1757–1769).

Burrell died unmarried and childless in 1787. He was succeeded in the baronetcy by his nephew's son, Peter, who was later elevated to the Peerage of Ireland as Baron Gwydyr.

Parliament of Great Britain
Preceded by William Ockenden; Samuel Tufnell	Member of Parliament for Great Marlow; 1747–1754; With: William Ockenden	Succeeded by Charles Churchill; Daniel Moore
Preceded by Lord George Bentinck; Thomas Hawkins	Member of Parliament for Grampound; 1754–1768; With: Simon Fanshawe	Succeeded by Grey Cooper; Charles Wolfran Cornwall
Preceded by William Burrell; Thomas More Molyneux	Member of Parliament for Haslemere; 1774–1780; With: Thomas More Molyneux 1774–1776; Peter Burrell 1776–1780	Succeeded by James Lowther; Edward Norton
Preceded by Paul Methuen; Viscount Cranborne	Member of Parliament for Great Bedwyn; 1780–1784; With: Paul Methuen 1780–1781; Paul Cobb Methuen 1781–1784	Succeeded by Marquess of Graham; Robert Manners
Government offices
Preceded by Matthews Beachcroft	Governor of the Bank of England; 1758–1760	Succeeded by Bartholomew Burton
Baronetage of Great Britain
New creation	Baronet (of West Grinstead Park); 1766–1787	Succeeded by Peter Burrell
