= Namazonurus namaquensis =

Namaqua girdled lizard

Conservation status
- Least Concern (IUCN 3.1)

Scientific classification
- Kingdom: Animalia
- Phylum: Chordata
- Class: Reptilia
- Order: Squamata
- Family: Cordylidae
- Genus: Namazonurus
- Species: N. namaquensis

Binomial name
- Namazonurus namaquensis (Methuen & Hewitt, 1914)

Species of lizard

The Namaqua girdled lizard (Namazonurus namaquensis) is a species of small, spiny lizard in the family Cordylidae. The species is native to Namibia and South Africa.
