= John Methuen, 6th Baron Methuen =

British peer

The Right Honourable The Lord Methuen

Member of the House of Lords
- Lord Temporal
- In office 21 June 1975 – 24 August 1994
- Preceded by: The 5th Baron Methuen
- Succeeded by: The 7th Baron Methuen

Personal details
- Born: Anthony John Methuen; 26 October 1925
- Died: 24 August 1994 (aged 68)
- Political party: Crossbench

Anthony John Methuen, 6th Baron Methuen (26 October 1925 – 24 August 1994), was a British peer.

== Personal life ==
Anthony John Methuen (known always as John) was the second but eldest surviving son of Anthony Methuen, 5th Baron Methuen, by his wife Grace Durning Holt, daughter of Sir Richard Durning Holt, 1st Baronet. He was educated at West Downs School. He succeeded his father in the barony in June 1975.

Lord Methuen died in August 1994, aged 68, and was succeeded by his younger brother Robert.

== Arms ==
Coat of arms of John Methuen, 6th Baron Methuen
Escutcheon Argent three wolves' heads erased Proper on the breast of an eagle with two heads displayed Sable. Supporters On either side two fiery lynxes reguardant Proper collared having a line passing between their forelegs reflexed over their backs Or. Motto Virtus Invidiae Scopus

Peerage of the United Kingdom
Preceded by Anthony Methuen	Baron Methuen; 1975–1994; Member of the House of Lords (1975–1994)	Succeeded by Robert Methuen
