= Methuen's dwarf gecko =

Conservation status
- Endangered (IUCN 3.1)

Scientific classification
- Kingdom: Animalia
- Phylum: Chordata
- Class: Reptilia
- Order: Squamata
- Suborder: Gekkota
- Family: Gekkonidae
- Genus: Lygodactylus
- Species: L. methueni

Binomial name
- Lygodactylus methueni V. Fitzsimons, 1937

Species of lizard

Methuen's dwarf gecko (Lygodactylus methueni), also known commonly as the Woodbrush dwarf gecko, is a species of lizard in the family Gekkonidae. The species is native to southern Africa.

== Etymology ==
The specific name, methueni, is in honor of British naturalist Paul Ayshford Methuen.

== Geographic range ==
Lygodactylus methueni is endemic to South Africa and is found near Haenertsburg in the Woodbush Forest area and Haenertsburg Common.

== Habitat ==
The preferred natural habitat of Lygodactylus methueni is montane grassland with rock outcrops, at elevations of 1,600–2,100 m (5,200–6,900 ft).

== Description ==
Lygodactylus methueni is olive-grey.

== Behaviour ==
Lygodactylus methueni is terrestrial and rupicolous (rock-dwelling). It shelters in rock crevices, and basks on the boles of large trees or on rocky outcrops.

== Reproduction ==
Lygodactylus methueni is oviparous.

== Conservation status ==
Forestry plantations and frequent fires pose a threat to the habitat of Lygodactylus methueni and have resulted in a reduction in the population.
