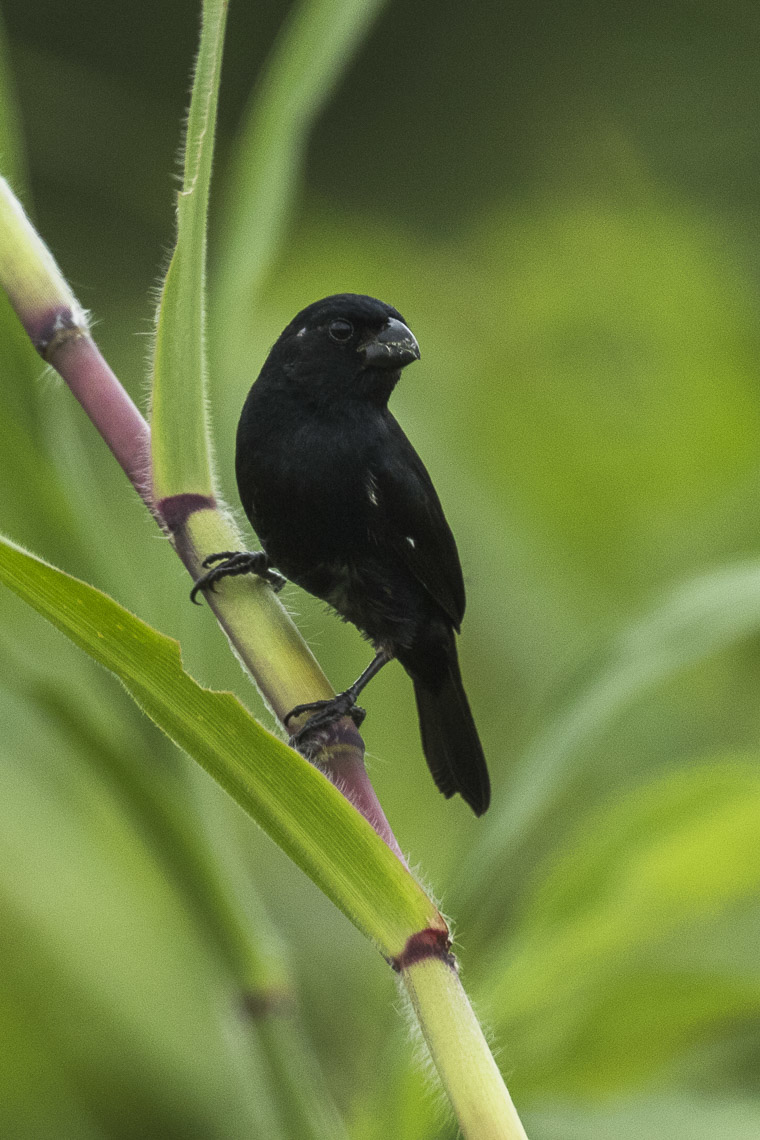
- Male
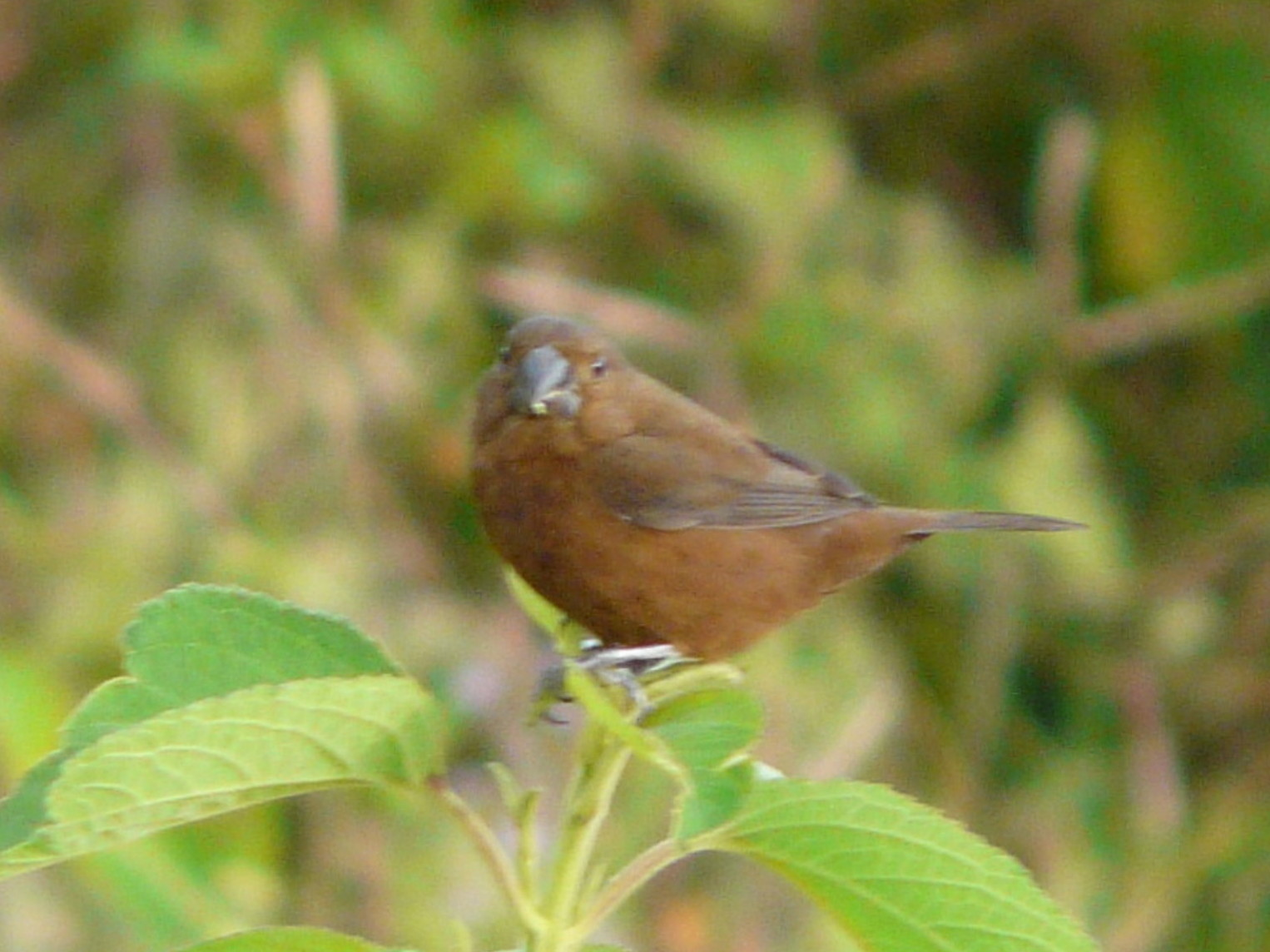
- Female

Conservation status
- Least Concern (IUCN 3.1)

Scientific classification
- Kingdom: Animalia
- Phylum: Chordata
- Class: Aves
- Order: Passeriformes
- Family: Thraupidae
- Genus: Sporophila
- Species: S. funerea

Binomial name
- Sporophila funerea (Sclater, PL, 1860)

= Thick-billed seed finch =

Species of bird

The thick-billed seed finch (Sporophila funerea) is a species of bird in the family Thraupidae, the tanagers and allies. It is found from Mexico to Ecuador.

== Taxonomy and systematics ==
The thick-billed seed finch has a complicated taxonomic history. It was formally described in 1860 with the binomial Oryzoborus funereus. At the time Oryzoborus was a member of the family Fringillidae. By 1970 it had been assigned to the family Emberizidae. Based on studies published between 1988 and 2011, beginning in 2012 the genus was moved to its present position in the tanager family Thraupidae. In 2014 taxonomic systems began merging Oryzoborus into Sporophila.

The thick-billed seed finch's further taxonomy is unsettled. As of September 2026 the most recent versions of the IOC taxonomy, AviList, and BirdLife International's Handbook of the Birds of the World assign it these five subspecies:

- S. f. funerea (Sclater, PL, 1860)
- S. f. salvini (Ridgway, 1884)
- S. f. ochrogyne Olson, 1981
- S. f. fractor Olson, 2007
- S. f. aethiops (Sclater, PL, 1860)

However, the Clements taxonomy treats it as monotypic, with no subspecies.

At times the thick-billed seed finch has been treated as conspecific with the chestnut-bellied seed finch with the latter's binomial S. angolensis and the English name "lesser seed finch". They hybridize in the small area where their ranges overlap in Colombia.

This article follows the majority five-subspecies model.

== Description ==
The thick-billed seed finch is 10.7 to 12.5 cm (4.2 to 4.9 in) long and weighs 12.8 to 13.9 g (0.45 to 0.49 oz). It has a short bill with a very deep base and a rounded culmen. The species is sexually dimorphic. Adult males of all subspecies are almost entirely black. They have white bases on the flight feathers that are seldom visible and white underwing coverts. Females have white underwing coverts but no white on the flight feathers. Adult females of the nominate subspecies S. f. funerea have a dark brown head and upperparts and paler cinnamon-brown underparts. Females of subspecies S. f. salvini have richer brown upperparts than the nominate and deep reddish chestnut underparts. Females of S. f. aethiops are similar to the nominate and those of S. f. ochrogyne are paler overall. Juveniles resemble adult females. Both sexes of all subspecies have a black iris, a blackish bill, and blackish legs.

== Distribution and habitat ==
The subspecies of the thick-billed seed finch are found thus:

- S. f. funerea: Gulf/Caribbean slope from central Veracruz in southeastern Mexico south (bypassing the Yucatán Peninsula) through Belize and northern Guatemala to north-central Honduras, and past a gap from eastern Honduras into northern Nicaragua
- S. f. salvini: Caribbean slope from southern Nicaragua through Costa Rica and Panama
- S. f. ochrogyne: Pacific slope from central Puntarenas Province in western Costa Rica south through Panama into Colombia; there across much of northern Colombia and south along its Central Andes (Note: AviList includes far northwestern Venezuela in S. f. ochrogyne's range. The IOC and Clements do not, and the South American Classification Committee has no records from the country.)
- S. f. fractor: Coiba Island in the Pacific off western Panama (Note: The IOC and AviList have only Coiba in S. f. fractor's range. Clements also includes the Pearl Islands.)
- S. f. aethiops: Between the Pacific and the Andes from west-central Colombia south through Ecuador to Manabí, central Guayas, and southern Los Rios provinces and from there away from the coast in the foothills to northeastern El Oro and northern Loja provinces

The thick-billed seed-finch inhabits "Second-growth Scrub, Secondary Forest, [and] Tropical Lowland Evergreen Forest Edge" [capitals in original]. It also is found in tall grass but favors scrubby areas within it. Sources differ on its maximum elevation. Two say it is overall 1,100 m (3,600 ft) but a third says it is 1,500 m (4,900 ft) in Central America. Field guides state it as 1,100 m (3,600 ft) in northern Central America, 1,200 m (3,900 ft) in Costa Rica, 1,600 m (5,200 ft) in Colombia, and 900 m (3,000 ft) in Ecuador.

== Behavior ==
=== Movement ===
The thick-billed seed finch is a sedentary year-round resident.

=== Feeding ===
The thick-billed seed finch feeds primarily on grass seeds. It forages nervously in thick cover, flicking its wings and tail. It typically forages singly or in pairs and sometimes in flocks with other seed-eating species.

=== Breeding ===
The thick-billed seed finch breeds between April and September in Middle America and between May and October in Colombia. Its nest is a cup made from rootlets, grasses, and plant fibers lined with fine fibers and spider web. It is typically in a bush, a tangle of vines, or a dense tree within about 1 m (3 ft) above the ground or sometimes water. The clutch is two or three eggs that are greenish white with brown or lilac spots. The incubation period, time to fledging, and details of parental care are not known.

=== Vocalization ===
One description of the male thick-billed seed finch's song is "a long and often complex phrase that gradually becomes more jumbled and twittery". It has been written as "techu techu chu chi techu chu chi...".

== Status ==
The IUCN has assessed the thick-billed seed finch as being of Least Concern. It has a very large range; its estimated population of at least 500,000 mature individuals is believed to be decreasing. No immediate threats have been identified. It is considered "uncommon to rare" overall in Mexico and Central America, "uncommon to fairly common" in northern Central America, "fairly uncommon" in Costa Rica, and "fairly common" in Colombia.
