= Frederick Methuen, 2nd Baron Methuen =

British peer and Liberal politician

The Right Honourable The Lord Methuen
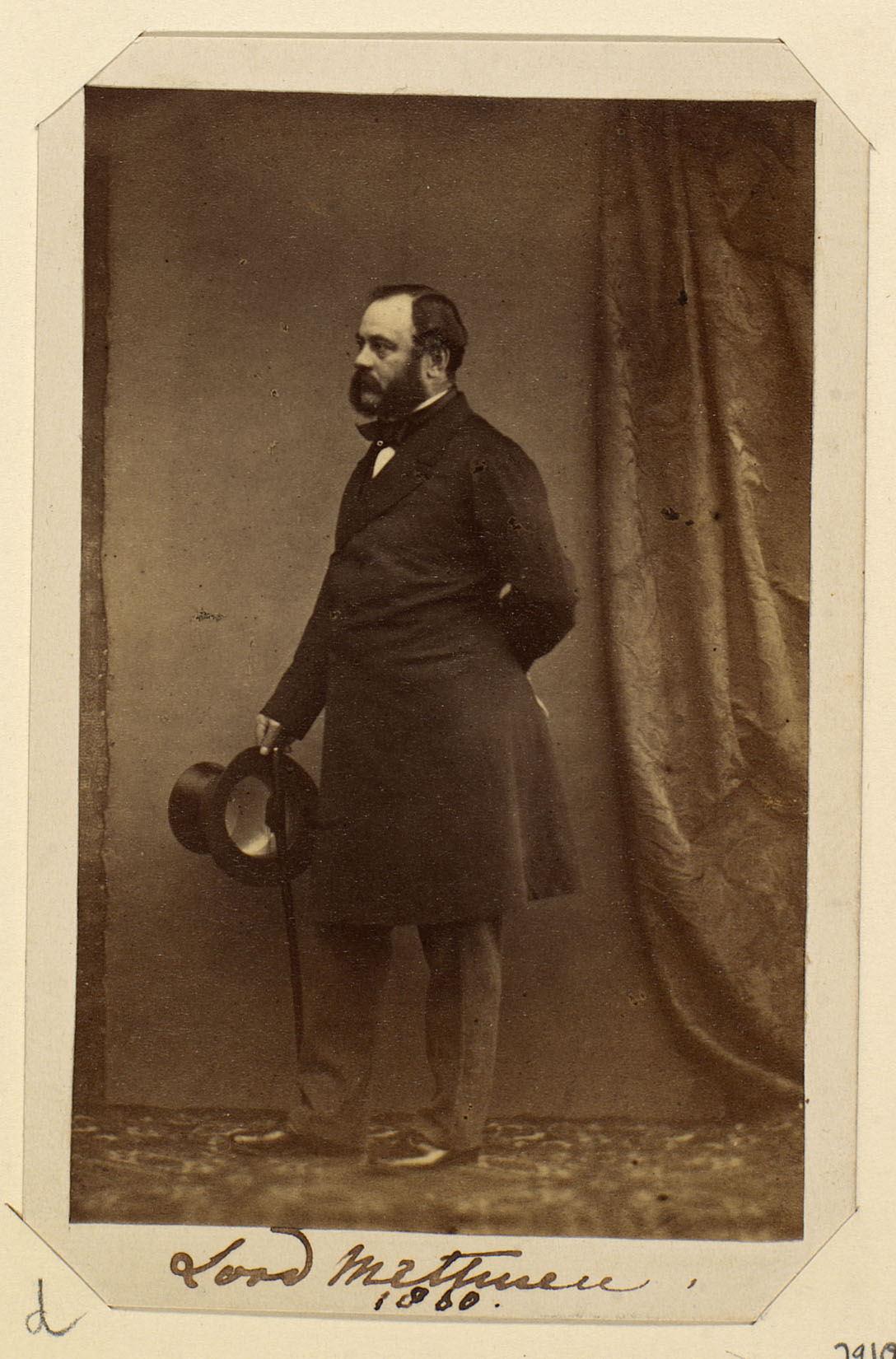
- Methuen

2nd Baron Methuen
- In office 1849-1891

Personal details
- Born: 23 February 1818
- Died: 26 September 1891 (aged 73)
- Spouse: Anna Horatia Caroline Sandford
- Parent: Paul Methuen, 1st Baron Methuen (father)
- Known for: Peer and Liberal politician

Frederick Henry Paul Methuen, 2nd Baron Methuen (23 February 1818 – 26 September 1891) was a British peer and Liberal politician.

Methuen was the son of Paul Methuen, 1st Baron Methuen, and his wife Jane Dorothea (née St John-Mildmay). He succeeded his father in the barony in 1849 and served as a Lord-in-waiting (government whip in the House of Lords) under Lord Palmerston and later Lord Russell between 1859 and 1866 and under William Ewart Gladstone from 1868 to 1874, 1880 to 1885, and in 1886. He was also an Aide-de-Camp to Queen Victoria.

He was appointed Lieutenant-Colonel of the Royal Wiltshire Militia in 1846, and became Lieutenant-Colonel Commandant of the regiment in 1859. The regiment became the 3rd (Royal Wiltshire Militia) Battalion, Wiltshire Regiment, in 1881. After his retirement he was appointed its Honorary Colonel in 1885.

He played once for the Marylebone Cricket Club in June 1843.

Lord Methuen married Anna Horatia Caroline Sandford, only daughter of Reverend John Sanford, vicar of Nynehead, Somerset, and his wife Elizabeth Georgiana Morgan (formerly Baroness Cloncurry, having been divorced from her first husband) in 1844. He died in September 1891, aged 73, and was succeeded in the barony by his eldest son Paul Methuen. Lady Methuen died in 1899.

Lord Methuen served under Lord Leigh as the first Deputy Grand Master of the Grand Lodge of Mark Master Masons, from 1856 to 1857.

== Arms ==
Coat of arms of Frederick Methuen, 2nd Baron Methuen
Escutcheon Argent three wolves' heads erased Proper on the breast of an eagle with two heads displayed Sable. Supporters On either side two fiery lynxes reguardant Proper collared having a line passing between their forelegs reflexed over their backs Or. Motto Virtus Invidiae Scopus

== Notes ==
Peerage of the United Kingdom
Preceded by Paul Methuen	Baron Methuen; 1849–1891	Succeeded by Paul Methuen
