= Namazonurus pustulatus =

Herero girdled lizard

Conservation status
- Least Concern (IUCN 3.1)

Scientific classification
- Kingdom: Animalia
- Phylum: Chordata
- Class: Reptilia
- Order: Squamata
- Family: Cordylidae
- Genus: Namazonurus
- Species: N. pustulatus

Binomial name
- Namazonurus pustulatus (W. Peters, 1862)

Species of lizard

The Herero girdled lizard (Namazonurus pustulatus) is a species of small, spiny lizard in the family Cordylidae. The species is endemic to Namibia.
