= Baron Methuen =

Title in the Peerage of the United Kingdom

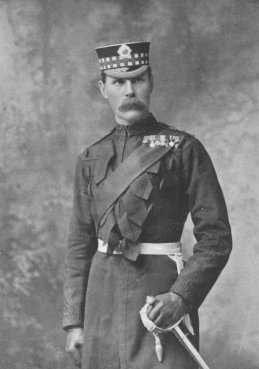
Paul Methuen, 3rd Baron Methuen

Baron Methuen, of Corsham in the County of Wiltshire, is a title in the Peerage of the United Kingdom. It was created in 1838 for the former Member of Parliament for Wiltshire and Wiltshire North, Paul Methuen. His grandson, the third Baron (who succeeded his father), was a distinguished soldier who became a field marshal. His son, the fourth Baron, was a professional artist and Royal Academician. On his death, the title passed to his younger brother, the fifth Baron. The seventh Baron, who succeeded his elder brother in 1994, was one of the ninety hereditary peers elected to the House of Lords after the passage of the House of Lords Act 1999, and sat on the Liberal Democrat benches. As of 2014, the title is held by his first cousin once removed, the eighth baron, who succeeded to the title in that year.

The first Baron's grandfather, Paul Methuen, was the cousin and heir of the wealthy Sir Paul Methuen, a well-known politician, courtier, diplomat and patron of art and literature, who was the son of John Methuen (c. 1650 – 1706), Lord Chancellor of Ireland between 1697 and 1703 and ambassador to Portugal. It was the last-named who in 1703 negotiated the famous Methuen Treaty, which, in return for the admission of English woollens into Portugal, granted differential duty favouring the importation of Portuguese wines into England to the disadvantage of French wines, and thus contributed to the replacement of the drinking of burgundy by that of port.

The family seat is Corsham Court, in Corsham, Wiltshire.

== Barons Methuen (1838) ==
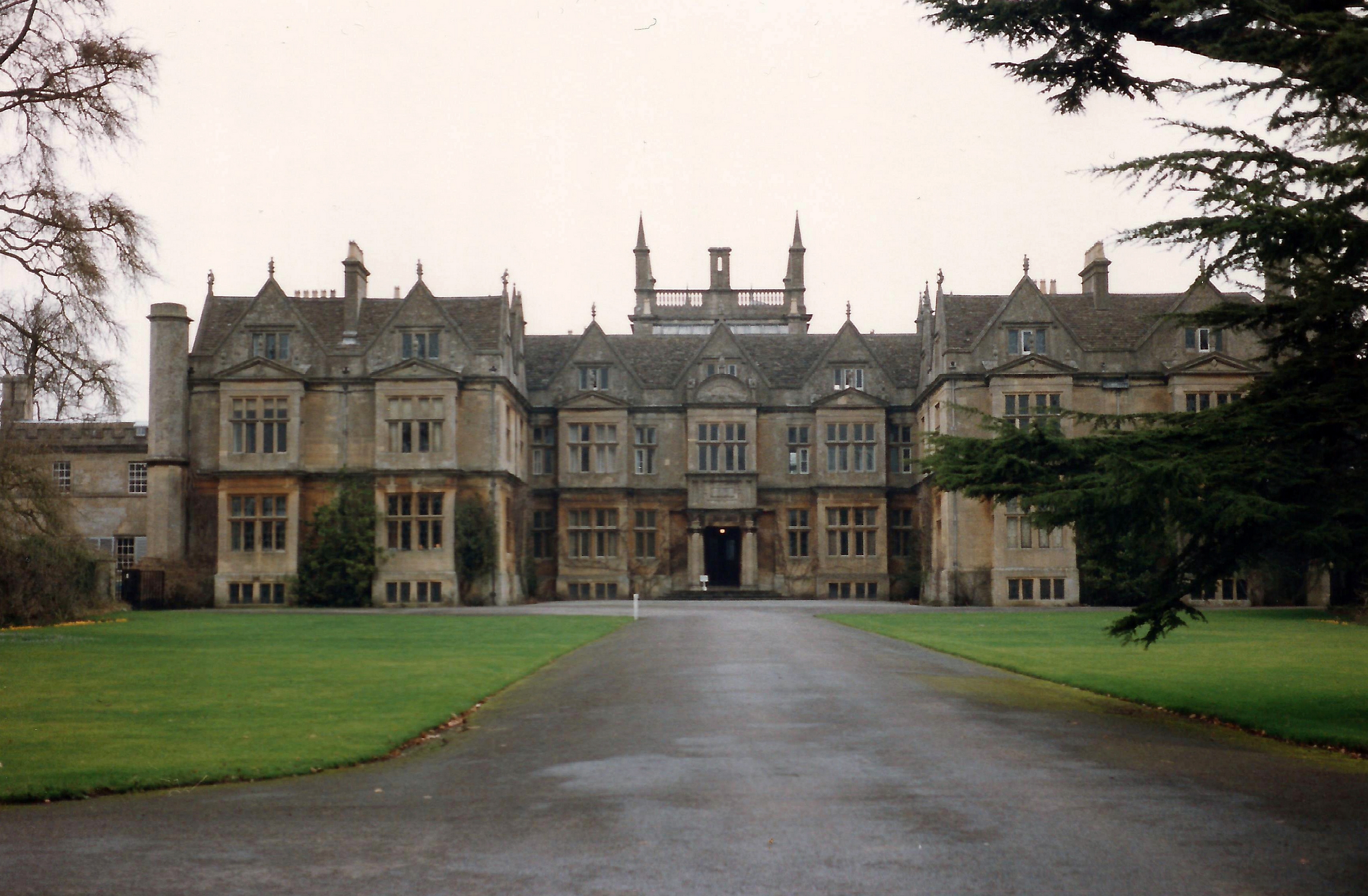
Corsham Court

- Paul Methuen, 1st Baron Methuen (1779–1849)
- Frederick Henry Paul Methuen, 2nd Baron Methuen (1818–1891)
- Paul Sanford Methuen, 3rd Baron Methuen (1845–1932)
- Paul Ayshford Methuen, 4th Baron Methuen (1886–1974)
- Anthony Paul Methuen, 5th Baron Methuen (1891–1975)
- (Anthony) John Methuen, 6th Baron Methuen (1925–1994)
- Robert Alexander Holt Methuen, 7th Baron Methuen (1931–2014)
- James Paul Archibald Methuen-Campbell, 8th Baron Methuen (born 1952).

The heir presumptive is the present holder's half-brother, Thomas Rice Mansel Methuen-Campbell (born 1977).

=== Title succession chart ===
Title succession chart, Barons Methuen.

Paul Methuen; 1st Baron Methuen; 1779–1849
Paul Methuen; 1814–1837	Frederick Methuen; 2nd Baron Methuen; 1818–1891
Field Marshal; Paul Methuen; 3rd Baron Methuen; 1845–1932
Paul Methuen; 4th Baron Methuen; 1886–1974	Anthony Methuen; 5th Baron Methuen; 1891–1975	Hon. Laurence Methuen; 1898–1970
Anthony Methuen; 1923–1934	John Methuen; 6th Baron Methuen; 1925–1994	Robert Methuen; 7th Baron Methuen; 1931–2014	Christopher Methuen-Campbell; 1928–1998
James Methuen-Campbell; 8th Baron Methuen born 1952	Thomas Methuen-Campbell born 1977

== Arms ==
Coat of arms of Baron Methuen
Escutcheon Argent three wolves' heads erased Proper on the breast of an eagle with two heads displayed Sable. Supporters On either side two fiery lynxes reguardant Proper collared having a line passing between their forelegs reflexed over their backs Or. Motto Virtus Invidiae Scopus

== Notes ==
- Kidd, Charles, ed. (1903). Debrett's peerage, baronetage, knightage, and companionage. London: Dean and son. p. 618.
