= Paul Methuen, 1st Baron Methuen =

British Whig politician

Paul Methuen, 1st Baron Methuen (21 June 1779 – 14 September 1849) was a British Whig politician who was raised to the peerage in 1838.

== Biography ==
Methuen was the son of Paul Cobb Methuen of Corsham, Wiltshire, and his wife Matilda (née Gooch). He sat as Member of Parliament for Wiltshire from 1812 to 1819 and for Wiltshire North from 1833 to 1837. He was appointed High Sheriff of Wiltshire for 1831 and raised in 1838 to the peerage as Baron Methuen, of Corsham in the County of Wiltshire.

Lord Methuen married Jane Dorothea, daughter of Sir Henry Paulet St John-Mildmay, in 1810. She died in 1846. Lord Methuen survived her by three years and died in September 1849, aged 70. He was succeeded in the barony by his son Frederick. His grandson Paul Methuen, 3rd Baron Methuen, became a prominent military commander.

Methuen played in an important cricket match in 1816 for Marylebone Cricket Club (MCC) but was dismissed without scoring in both his innings. He was born at Marylebone, London, and died aged 69 at Westminster.

== Arms ==
Coat of arms of Paul Methuen, 1st Baron Methuen
Escutcheon Argent three wolves’ heads erased Proper on the breast of an eagle with two heads displayed Sable. Supporters On either team two fiery lynxes reguardant Proper collared having a line passing between their forelegs reflexed over their backs Or. Motto Virtus Invidiae Scopus

== Bibliography ==
- Kidd, Charles, Williamson, David (editors). Debrett's Peerage and Baronetage (1990 edition). New York: St Martin's Press, 1990,
- Leigh Rayment's Peerage Pages
- Leigh Rayment's Historical List of MPs
- Lundy, Darryl. "FAQ". The Peerage.

Parliament of the United Kingdom
Preceded by Henry Penruddocke Wyndham; Richard Godolphin Long	Member of Parliament for Wiltshire; 1812–1819; With: Richard Godolphin Long 1812–1818; William Pole-Tylney-Long-Wellesley 1818–1819	Succeeded by William Pole-Tylney-Long-Wellesley; John Benett
New constituency	Member of Parliament for Wiltshire North; 1832–1837; With: Sir John Dugdale Astley 1832–1835; Walter Long 1835–1837	Succeeded by Walter Long; Sir Francis Burdett
Peerage of the United Kingdom
New creation	Baron Methuen; 1838–1849	Succeeded by Frederick Methuen
