= Paul Methuen (MP) =

English politician

Paul Methuen (16 May 1723 – 22 January 1795) was an English politician.

He was the son of Thomas Methuen of Bradford-on-Avon and was the cousin and heir of politician-diplomat Sir Paul Methuen (1672–1757). He went to Oriel College, Oxford.

He was Member of Parliament (MP) for Westbury 1747–1748, for Warwick 1762–1768, and Great Bedwyn 1774–1781.

Methuen bought Garsdon manor, Wiltshire, in 1758. His grandson, also Paul, became Baron Methuen in 1838.

Parliament of Great Britain
Preceded by George Evans; Joseph Townsend	Member of Parliament for Westbury; 1747–1748; With: John Bance	Succeeded by Chauncy Townsend; Matthew Michell
Preceded by Hamilton Boyle; Henry Archer	Member of Parliament for Warwick; 1762–1768; With: Henry Archer	Succeeded by George Greville; Henry Archer
Preceded by William Burke; James Stopford, Earl of Courtown	Member of Parliament for Great Bedwyn; 1774–1781; With: The Earl of Courtown, to Dec. 1774; James Cecil, 1774–80; Sir Merrick Burrell, from 1780	Succeeded by Paul Cobb Methuen; Sir Merrick Burrell
