= Paul Cobb Methuen =

English politician

Paul Cobb Methuen (15 June 1752 – 15 September 1816) was an English politician.

He was the eldest son of Paul Methuen of Corsham, Wiltshire and Christian née Cobb and educated at University College, Oxford (1769).

He was member of parliament (MP) for Great Bedwyn from 1781 to 1784. He was appointed High Sheriff of Wiltshire for 1780–81.

He married Matilda, the daughter of Sir Thomas Gooch, 3rd Baronet of Benacre, Suffolk and had four sons, including Paul Methuen, later 1st Baron Methuen, and four daughters.

Parliament of Great Britain
Preceded by Sir Merrick Burrell and Paul Methuen	Member of Parliament for Great Bedwyn; 1781–1784; With: Sir Merrick Burrell	Succeeded by Robert Manners and Lord Graham
