= Paul Ayshford Methuen, 4th Baron Methuen =

British painter, zoologist and landowner

The Right Honourable The Lord Methuen RA PPRWA
- The Lord Methuen, by Walter Stoneman; bromide print, February 1938, National Portrait Gallery collection
- Born: Paul Ayshford Methuen; 29 September 1886; Corsham, Wiltshire, England
- Died: 7 January 1974 (aged 87); Bath, Somerset, England
- Spouse: Eleanor "Norah" Hennessy
- Elected: 1939–71 President, Royal West of England Academy; 1947 Honorary Associate, Royal Institute of British Architects; 1951 Fellow, Society of Antiquaries; 1951 Associate, Royal Academy; 1959 Royal Academician

Paul Ayshford Methuen, 4th Baron Methuen RA PPRWA (29 September 1886 – 7 January 1974) was a painter, zoologist and landowner.

== Life ==
From 1910 to 1914 he worked in the Transvaal Museum in Pretoria, where he published several scientific papers with the South African herpetologist, John Hewitt, with whom he collected and described a number of southern African and Madagascan genera and species in the early 20th century. He later refused a chair in zoology at a South African university because of his commitment to his ancestral home.

Methuen had studied drawing at Eton, at the Ruskin in Oxford, and with Charles Holmes. In 1927 he attended art classes given by Walter Sickert, which had a permanent effect on his painting style. He established a reputation as a serious artist. His preferred subjects were urban views and outdoor scenes with buildings, animals, and plants, such as the magnolias and orchids he grew at Corsham Court.

In 1939 he rejoined his regiment and served as a captain until 1944 when he was moved to the Procurement and Fine Art branch set up to protect works of art during the invasion of the continent. He later recounted his experiences in his book Normandy Diary. During the War, Methuen also received a number of commissions from the War Artists' Advisory Committee, mainly for scenes painted in the London dockyards.

Four years after the destruction of the premises of the Bath School of Art in 1942, Methuen offered Corsham Court, which during the war had been first the temporary home of Westonbirt School and then a convalescent hospital for officers, to the new Bath Academy of Art under Clifford Ellis. It remained there until 1972; Corsham Court is now used by Bath Spa University.

From 1939 to 1971, Methuen was president of the Royal West of England Academy in Bristol. He was elected an Associate of the Royal Academy in 1951, and became a Royal Academician in 1959. He was also elected an Honorary Associate of the Royal Institute of British Architects (Hon ARIBA) in 1947 and a fellow of the Society of Antiquaries in 1951.

His wife’s brother, Phillip Mather Hennessy was married to Count Carl Seilern und Aspang’s sister, Ida, making Antoine Seilern his cousin.

== Legacy ==
A species of South African lizard, Lygodactylus methueni, is named in honor of Paul Ayshford Methuen.

== Arms ==
Coat of arms of Paul Ayshford Methuen, 4th Baron Methuen
Escutcheon Argent three wolves' heads erased Proper on the breast of an eagle with two heads displayed Sable. Supporters On either side two fiery lynxes reguardant Proper collared having a line passing between their forelegs reflexed over their backs Or. Motto Virtus Invidiae Scopus

== Publications ==
- Methuen P.A., Hewitt J. (1915). "A contribution to our knowledge of the anatomy of Chamaeleons". Transactions of the Royal Society of South Africa. 4: 89–104. doi:10.1080/00359191409519518.
- —; Hewitt, J. (1913). "On a collection of reptiles from Madagascar made during the year 1911". Annals of the Transvaal Museum. 3 (4): 183–193 + plates V–XI. hdl:10520/AJA00411752_897. ISSN 0041-1752.
- —; Hewitt, J. (1913). "On a collection of Batrachia from Madagascar made during the year 1911". Annals of the Transvaal Museum. 4 (2): 49–64 + plates IX, X.
- —; Hewitt, J. (1913). "The Percy Sladen Memorial Expedition to Great Namaqualand, 1912–1913. Records and descriptions of the reptiles and batrachians of the collection". Annals of the Transvaal Museum. 4 (3): 118–145 + plate XIV.
- —; Hewitt, John (1913). "Descriptions of Some New Batrachia and Lacertilia from South Africa". Transactions of the Royal Society of South Africa. 3 (1): 107–111. Bibcode:1913TRSSA...3..107H. doi:10.1080/00359191309519682. ISSN 0035-919X.
- — (1952). Normandy Diary: Being a Record of Survivals and Losses of Historical Monuments in North-western France, Together with Those in the Island of Walcheren and in that Part of Belgium Traversed by the 21st Army Group in 1944-45. Robert Hale.
- — (1958). An historical account of Corsham Court: the Methuen collection of pictures and the furniture in the state rooms. Corsham, England: Corsham Estates.
- — (1970). A catalogue of the Methuen miniatures at Corsham Court, Wilts. Strathmore Press.

Peerage of the United Kingdom
Preceded by Paul Sanford Methuen	Baron Methuen; 1932–1974	Succeeded by Anthony Paul Methuen
