= Paul Methuen, 3rd Baron Methuen =

British Army officer (1845–1932)

Field Marshal The Right Honourable The Lord Methuen GCB GCMG GCVO DL
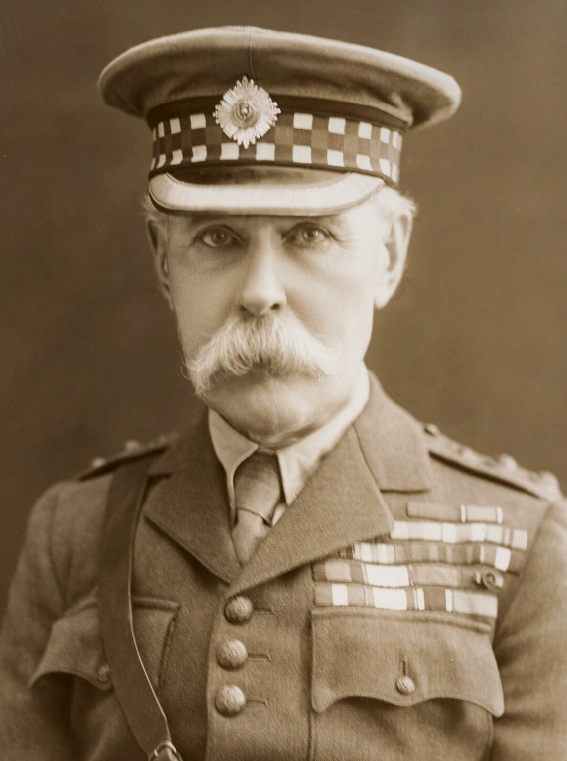
- Methuen in 1919
- Born: 1 September 1845; Corsham Court, Wiltshire
- Died: 30 October 1932 (aged 87); Corsham Court, Wiltshire
- Military career
- Allegiance: United Kingdom
- Branch: British Army
- Service years: 1864–1912
- Rank: Field Marshal
- Unit: Scots Guards
- Commands: Malta; Natal; South Africa; 1st Division; Eastern Command; Home District
- Conflicts: Third Anglo-Ashanti War; Second Boer War
- Awards: Knight Grand Cross of the Order of the Bath; Knight Grand Cross of the Order of St Michael and St George; Knight Grand Cross of the Royal Victorian Order; Mentioned in Despatches

Field Marshal Paul Sanford Methuen, 3rd Baron Methuen, GCB, GCMG, GCVO, DL (1 September 1845 – 30 October 1932) was a British Army officer. He served in the Third Anglo-Ashanti War in 1873 and then in the expedition of Sir Charles Warren to Bechuanaland in the mid-1880s. He took a prominent role as General Officer Commanding the 1st Division in the Second Boer War. He suffered a serious defeat at the Battle of Magersfontein, during which he failed to carry out adequate reconnaissance and accordingly his artillery bombarded the wrong place leading to the Highland Brigade taking heavy casualties. He was later captured by the Boers at Tweebosch. After the war, he became General Officer Commanding-in-Chief in South Africa in 1908, Governor and Commander-in-Chief of Natal in 1910 and then Governor and Commander-in-Chief of Malta in 1915.

== Early life ==
Paul Sanford Methuen was born at Corsham Court, Wiltshire, the eldest of three sons of Frederick Methuen, 2nd Baron Methuen, and his wife Anna Horatia Caroline Methuen (née Sanford).

== Early military career ==
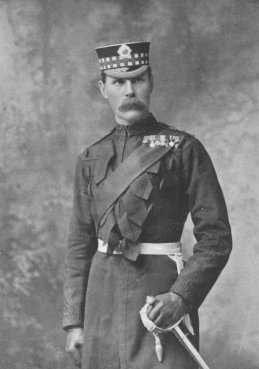
Paul Methuen, 3rd Baron Methuen

Educated at Eton College, Methuen served two years as a cornet in the Royal Wiltshire Yeomanry and then joined the Scots Fusilier Guards as an ensign in the regiment and lieutenant in the army on 22 November 1864. He was promoted to lieutenant in the regiment and captain in the army on 25 December 1867, and became adjutant of the 1st battalion in 1868. He became brigade major, Home District in 1871 and saw active duty on the staff of Sir Garnet Wolseley at Amoaful in 1873 during the Third Anglo-Ashanti War. Promoted to captain in the regiment and lieutenant colonel in the army on 15 July 1876, he became assistant military secretary in Ireland in 1877, military attaché in Berlin in 1878 and quartermaster-general at the Home District in April 1881, before being promoted to colonel on 1 July. He was the commandant of headquarters in Egypt for three months in 1882, being present at the Battle of Tel el-Kebir. On return to the UK he became assistant-adjutant and quartermaster-general for the Home District again. He was promoted to major in the regiment on 25 October 1882.

Methuen served in the expedition of Sir Charles Warren to Bechuanaland from 1884 to 1885, where he commanded Methuen's Horse, a corps of mounted rifles. He became deputy adjutant-general, in South Africa in 1888, and having been promoted to major general on 21 May 1890, he succeeded his father as 3rd baron in 1891. He became Major-General commanding the Brigade of Guards and General Officer Commanding the Home District in April 1892 and then served as press censor at headquarters on the Tirah expedition in 1897. Promoted to lieutenant general on 1 April 1898, he was given the command of the 1st Division on the outbreak of the Second Boer War.

== Second Boer War ==
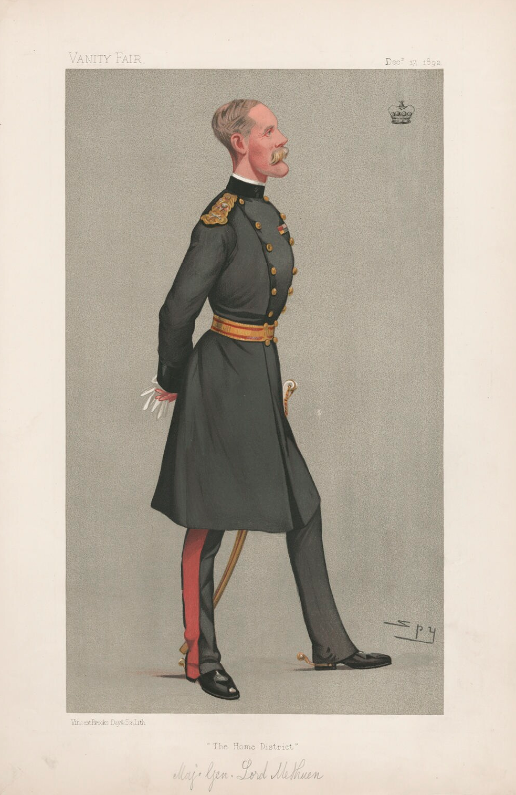
Field Marshal Lord Methuen by Leslie Ward.

Methuen was a perfect Christian knight – there could not be a nobler gentleman

— Koos de la Rey

Methuen reached South Africa in November 1899 with orders to relieve Kimberley but initially just expelled the Boers from Belmont and Graspan. He was slightly wounded at the Battle of Modder River. He suffered both defeats and successes during the war. His greatest defeat was at the Battle of Magersfontein, during which he failed to carry out adequate reconnaissance and accordingly his artillery bombarded the wrong place leading to the Highland Brigade taking heavy casualties. The battle was regarded as one of the three British disasters in "Black Week" that led to the despatch of Lord Roberts to South Africa.

After Magersfontein, Methuen remained in the Kimberley–Boshof area trying to capture Boer General Christiaan de Wet. Methuen was himself captured by the Boers at Tweebosch on 7 March 1902. He had been wounded in the battle when he broke his leg after his horse fell on him. Boer General Koos de la Rey released him due to the severity of his injuries, providing his personal cart to take Methuen to the hospital in Klerksdorp. The two allegedly became lifelong friends as a result of this action. Following the end of hostilities in early June 1902, he left Cape Town with other invalids and convalescents on board the SS Assaye, arriving in Southampton the following month, still walking with crutches.

In his final despatch from South Africa in June 1902, Lord Kitchener, Commander-in-Chief of the forces during the latter part of the war, described the effort of his brother officer the following way:

Lieutenant-General Lord Methuen has done more than most Officers towards maintaining throughout this campaign the high standard for personal courage, modesty and humanity which characterize the British Army. I share his own deep regret that his wounds have prevented him from remaining in the field until the conclusion of peace.

For his war service, he received the Queen's South Africa Medal with clasps and was promoted to a Knight Commander of the Order of the Bath (KCB) in the 1901 South Africa Honours list (the order was dated to 29 November 1900, and he was only invested as such after his return home, by King Edward VII at Buckingham Palace on 24 October 1902). He was further promoted to a Knight Grand Cross in the Order (GCB) in the October 1902 South Africa Honours list, and invested with the insignia by the King at Buckingham Palace on 18 December 1902.

== Later military career ==
Despite visible setbacks on the battlefield during the Boer War, Methuen continued to be well-regarded and was given more responsibilities. Appointed colonel of the Scots Guards on 1 May 1904 and promoted to full general on 26 May, he was given the command of the IV Army Corps in June 1904, before it was reconstituted as Eastern Command in June 1905. He was also invited to become a board member of the Royal Patriotic Fund Corporation in August 1905. He became General Officer Commanding-in-Chief in South Africa in April 1908 and Governor and Commander-in-Chief of Natal in January 1910 before being promoted to field marshal on 19 June 1911.

Methuen helped raise the standards of training of the British Expeditionary Force in 1914 and was appointed Governor and Commander-in-Chief of Malta in February 1915, a post he held until he retired in May 1919.

In retirement Methuen was appointed Constable of the Tower late in 1919 and deputy lieutenant of Wiltshire in 1921. He devoted himself to the interests of the Brigade of Guards and died at Corsham Court on 30 October 1932.

== Family ==
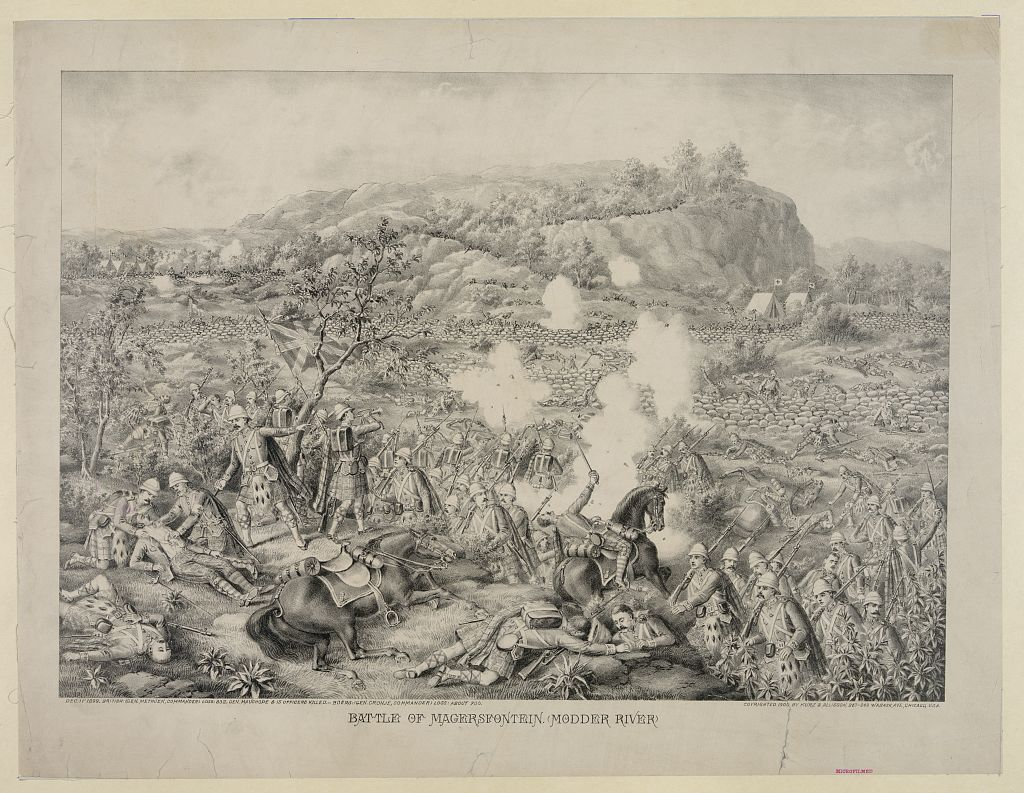
The Battle of Magersfontein, at which Methuen suffered a serious defeat, during the Second Boer War

Lord Methuen was married twice, first to Evelyn, the eldest daughter of Sir Frederick Hervey-Bathurst, of Clarendon Park, Wiltshire. They were married in 1878 until her death in 1879. He then married in 1884, his cousin Mary Ethel, the second daughter of William Ayshford Sanford, of Nynehead Court. They had three sons and two daughters. He was succeeded by his eldest son, the painter and zoologist Paul Ayshford Methuen, 4th Baron Methuen. A portrait painting of Methuen by his son from 1920 is in the National Portrait Gallery, London.

== Decorations ==
British

- Knight Grand Cross of the Order of the Bath – 22 August 1902 (KCB – 29 November 1900; CB – 17 November 1882)
- Knight Grand Cross of the Order of St Michael and St George – 3 June 1919 (CMG – 1886)
- Knight Grand Cross of the Royal Victorian Order – 1910 (KCVO – 30 June 1897)

Foreign

- Grand Officer of the Order of the Crown of Italy (Italy) – 31 August 1917
- Grand Cross of the Legion of Honour (France) – 17 August 1918

== Arms ==
Coat of arms of Paul Methuen, 3rd Baron Methuen
Escutcheon Argent three wolves’ heads erased Proper on the breast of an eagle with two heads displayed Sable. Supporters On either side two fiery lynxes reguardant Proper collared having a line passing between their forelegs reflexed over their backs Or. Motto Virtus Invidiae Scopus

== Sources ==
- Creswicke, Louis (1900). "XVII – Transvaal (West)". South Africa and the Transvaal war. Edinburgh: T. C. & E. C. Jack.
- Heathcote, T. A. (1999). The British Field Marshals, 1763–1997: A Biographical Dictionary. Leo Cooper. ISBN 978-0-85052-696-7.
- Jeppe, Carl (1906). The kaleidoscopic Transvaal. Cape Town: J. C. Juta and co. ISBN 978-1458886484.
- Spender, Harold (1919). General Botha. London: Constable. ASIN B009S1VFBU.
- British commanders in the Transvaal War, 1899–1900. Bristol: W. D. & H. O. Wills. 1900.

Military offices
Preceded by Philip Smith	GOC Home District; 1892–1897	Succeeded by Sir Henry Trotter
Preceded by The Duke of Connaught and Strathearn	Colonel of the Scots Guards; 1904–1932	Succeeded by The Duke of York
Preceded by The Lord Grenfell	GOC IV Army Corps (GOC-in-C Eastern Command from 1905); 1904–1908	Succeeded by Sir Arthur Paget
Government offices
Preceded by Sir Leslie Rundle	Governor of Malta; 1915–1919	Succeeded by Lord Plumer
Honorary titles
Preceded by Sir Evelyn Wood	Constable of the Tower of London; 1920–1932	Succeeded by Lord Milne
Peerage of the United Kingdom
Preceded by Frederick Henry Paul Methuen	Baron Methuen; 1891–1932	Succeeded by Paul Ayshford Methuen
