= Philip Carteret Webb =

English barrister and antiquarian

Philip Carteret Webb (14 August 1702 – 22 June 1770) was an English barrister, involved with the 18th-century antiquarian movement.

He became a member of the London Society of Antiquaries in 1747, and as its lawyer, was responsible for securing the incorporation of the Society in 1751. This act was important in putting the society on level terms, in terms of finance and national prestige, with the Royal Society, which some antiquaries saw as a rival.

Webb has remembered also as an agent of the crown in the North Briton scandal (1763), assisting Robert Wood to seize the papers of radical journalist John Wilkes, whose writings had offended the king.

== Early life ==
He was born at Devizes in Wiltshire, and was admitted attorney-at-law on 20 June 1724. He practised at first in Old Jewry, then moved to Budge Row, and afterwards settled in Great Queen Street, Lincoln's Inn Fields. On 18 December 1727 he was admitted at the Middle Temple, and on 8 April 1741 was admitted at Lincoln's Inn.

Early in his career, he acquired a reputation for knowledge of records and of precedents on constitutional law. After the suppression of the Jacobite rebellion of 1745 he acted for the state as solicitor in trials of the prisoners. Lord Hardwicke made him secretary of bankrupts in the court of chancery, and he retained the post until 1766, when Lord Northington ceased to be lord chancellor.

== In politics ==
Webb was elected F.S.A. on 26 November 1747 and F.R.S. on 9 November 1749, and, in 1751, he assisted materially in obtaining the charter of incorporation for the Society of Antiquaries.

In 1748, he purchased the estate of Busbridge, near the borough of Haslemere in Surrey, which gave him considerable influence in a rotten borough. He sat for Haslemere in the parliaments from 1754 to 1761, and from 1761 to 1768. The first of these elections elicited in 1754 the ballad, attributed to Dr William King, of St Mary Hall, Oxford, of ‘The Cow of Haslemere,’ which had eight calves, for each of which a vote in Webb's interest was claimed.

== The Wilkes case ==
In December 1756, Webb was made joint-solicitor to the treasury, and held that post until June 1765; he was consequently a leading official in the proceedings against John Wilkes, and for his acts was dubbed by Horace Walpole ‘a most villainous tool and agent in any iniquity,’ ‘that dirty wretch,’ and ‘a sorry knave.’ In the action brought against Wood, Lord Egremont's secretary, for seizing Wilkes's papers, Webb, as a witness, swore that while in the house he had no key in his hand. For this he was tried before Lord Mansfield, with a special jury, for perjury, on 22 May 1764. The trial lasted seven hours, and the jury, after an absence of nearly an hour, returned a verdict of not guilty. A motion by Sir Joseph Mawbey in November 1768 for a return of all moneys paid to Webb for prosecutions was refused. On the charge made in the House of Commons on 31 January 1769 that Webb had bribed with public money Michael Curry, to betray Wilkes and give evidence against him, counsel pleaded on behalf of Webb that he was now blind and of impaired intellect, and the motion against him was defeated.

== Death ==
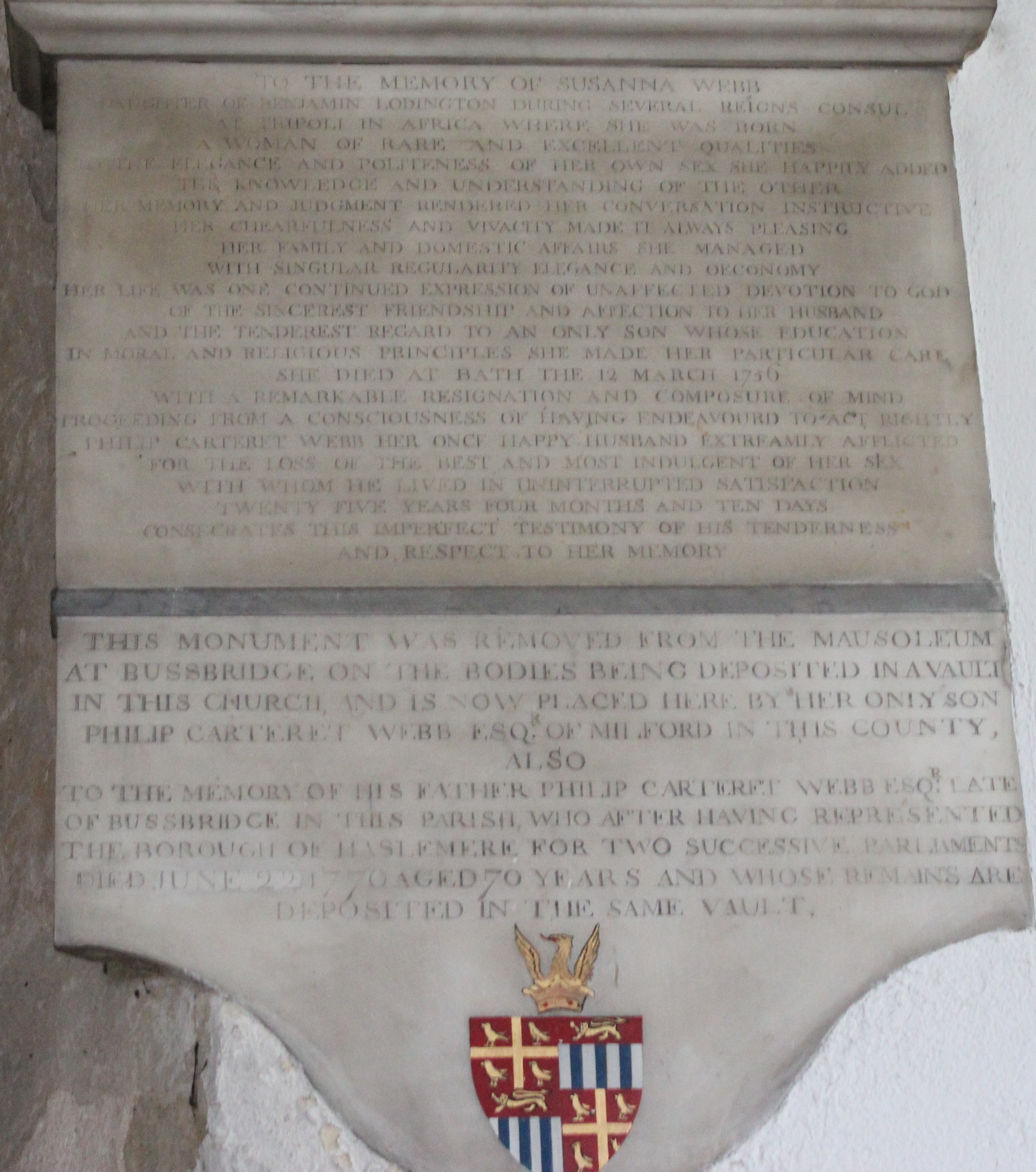
Memorial in the Church of St. Peter & St. Paul, Godalming

Webb died at his seat of Busbridge Hall on 22 June 1770.

== Works ==
He was the author of Remarks on the Pretender's Declaration and Commission, 1745, dated from Lincoln's Inn on 12 October in that year, and of Remarks on the Pretender's Eldest Son's Second Declaration, 1745, which came out subsequently.

Webb was the leader in seizing, among the papers of Wilkes, the poem of the Essay on Woman; and when the legality of general warrants was impugned, he printed privately and anonymously a volume of Copies taken from the Records of the Court of King's Bench, the Office-books of the Secretaries of State, of Warrants issued by Secretaries of State, 1763. He also printed Some Observations on the late determination for Discharging Mr. Wilkes from the Tower. By a Member of the House of Commons, 1763.

Other works of Webb were:

- A Letter to Rev. William Warburton on some Passages in the “Divine Legation of Moses.” By a Gentleman of Lincoln's Inn, 1742. Reply to The Divine Legation of Moses.
- Observations on the course of Proceedings in the Admiralty Courts, 1747.
- Excerpta ex Instrumentis Publicis de Judæis, 1753.
- Short but True State of Facts relative to the Jew Bill, 1753.
- The Question whether a Jew born within the British Dominions could before the late Act purchase and hold Lands. By a Gentleman of Lincoln's Inn, 1753; a reply to the question was written by Joseph Grove.
- A Short Account of Danegeld. By a Member of the Society of Antiquaries. Read at a meeting 1 April 1756.

A Short Account of Domesday Book, with a view to its Publication. By a Member of the Society of Antiquaries. Read 18 Dec. 1755, 1756.

- State of Facts on his Majesty's Right to certain Fee-farm Rents in Norfolk, 1758; hundred copies only.
- Account of a Copper Table with two inscriptions, Greek and Latin, discovered in 1732 near Heraclea. Read before Antiquaries, 13 Dec. 1759, 1760. On 12 March 1760 he presented this table, one of the Tables of Heraclea, to the king of Spain, through the Neapolitan minister, for the royal collection at Naples, and he received in return a diamond ring.

Webb wrote in the Moderator and contributed to the Philosophical Transactions. John Topham served under him.

== Collector ==
The manuscripts of Sir Julius Cæsar were dispersed by auction in 1757, and nearly one-third of the collection was purchased by Webb. These, with his other manuscripts on paper, were bought from his widow by Lord Shelburne, and later went to the Lansdowne manuscripts at the British Museum.

Webb sold to the House of Lords thirty manuscript volumes of the rolls of parliament, and the rest of his library, including his manuscripts on vellum, was sold on 25 February 1771 and sixteen following days. His most valuable coins and medals were acquired by Matthew Duane; the remainder and his ancient marble busts and bronzes were sold in 1771. On the death of his widow his other collections were sold by Abraham Langford.

== Naturalist ==
A letter from Emanuel Mendes da Costa to Webb is in John Nichols's Illustrations of Literature (iv. 788–9). In July 1758 he obtained from the Society of Arts a silver medal for having planted a large quantity of acorns for timber.

== Family ==
He married, on 2 November 1730, Susanna, daughter of Benjamin Lodington, many years consul at Tripoli. She died at Bath on 12 March 1756, aged 45, leaving one son, also called Philip Carteret Webb (d. 10 October 1793). Two other children died in infancy, and, at her own desire, Mrs. Webb was buried with them in a cave in the grounds at Busbridge. They were afterwards disinterred and placed in a vault under Godalming church, with a monument to her and her husband.

In August 1758 Webb married Rhoda, daughter of John or James Cotes of Dodington in Cheshire, and by her had no issue. He bequeathed to her everything that he could. She married, on 5 September 1771, Edward Bever of Farnham, Surrey, and in 1775 sold the estate of Busbridge.
