= William Nedham (British politician) =

Irish and British politician

William Nedham (c. 1740–1806) was an Irish and British politician who sat in the House of Commons between 1774 and 1790.

Nedham was the third son of Robert Nedham MP and his wife Catherine Pitt, daughter of Robert Pitt MP of Boconnoc, Cornwall. His family had long established connections in Jamaica, but he and his father never lived there. He was educated at Eton College from 1756 to 1761 and was admitted at Trinity Hall, Cambridge on 31 January 1762. He was also admitted at the Inner Temple on 2 May 1758. He was awarded MA in 1766. In 1767, he succeeded his brother and had property at Howbery Park, Oxfordshire, Edwinstone, Nottinghamshire and Symonds Place, Waresley Park, Huntingdonshire.

Nedham was a member of the Parliament of Ireland for Newry from 1767 to 1776. He was returned as Member of Parliament for Winchelsea on the Nesbitt interest at a by-election on 13 August 1774, but Parliament was dissolved six weeks later. At the 1774 general election he stood at Wallingford where he was supported by Lord Abingdon, but had to withdraw after polling began.

He was High Sheriff of Oxfordshire in 1774–5. He was returned for Winchelsea again in a by-election on 3 January 1775 after Arnold Nesbitt decided to sit for Cricklade instead. In the 1780 general election Nedham was returned for Pontefract by his friend Robert Monckton-Arundell, 4th Viscount Galway. He was once again returned for Winchelsea at the 1784 general election on the Nesbitt interest. He did not stand in 1790. He appears never to have spoken in the House of Commons.

Nedham died unmarried at his home in Grosvenor Square on 27 April 1806, aged 65.

Parliament of Great Britain
Preceded by The Earl of Thomond; Arnold Nesbitt	Member of Parliament for Winchelsea; 1774–1774; With: Arnold Nesbitt	Succeeded by Charles Wolfran Cornwall; Arnold Nesbitt
Preceded by Charles Wolfran Cornwall; Arnold Nesbitt	Member of Parliament for Winchelsea; 1775–1780; With: Charles Wolfran Cornwall	Succeeded by Charles Wolfran Cornwall; John Nesbitt
Preceded by Charles Wolfran Cornwall; John Nesbitt	Member of Parliament for Winchelsea; 1784–1790; With: John Nesbitt	Succeeded by Viscount Barnard; Richard Barwell
Preceded by Sir John Goodricke, Bt. Charles Mellish	Member of Parliament for Pontefract; 1780–1784; With: 4th Viscount Galway; Nathaniel Smith; John Smyth	Succeeded by William Sotheron; John Smyth
