= James MacLean =

James MacLean may refer to:

- James MacLean (priest), Canadian Anglican priest
- James R. MacLean, merchant, notary public and political figure in Prince Edward Island
- James Noël MacKenzie MacLean, Scottish historian and author
- James Mackenzie Maclean, British journalist and politician
- James MacLaine, occasionally MacLean, Irish highwayman in London

== See also ==
- James McLean (disambiguation)
