= Charles Wolfran Cornwall =

British politician (1735–1789)

The Right Honourable Charles Wolfran Cornwall
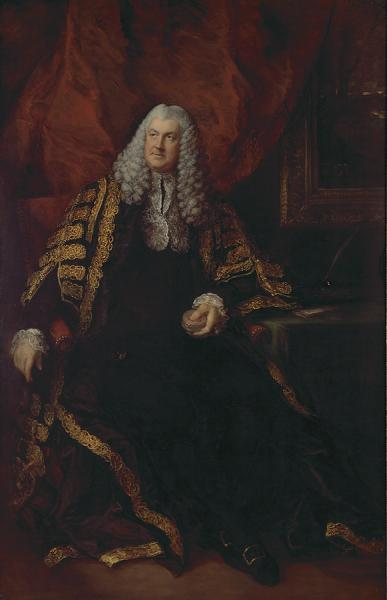
- Portrait by Thomas Gainsborough

Speaker of the House of Commons of Great Britain
- In office 31 October 1780 – 2 January 1789
- Monarch: George III
- Prime Minister: Frederick North; Charles Watson-Wentworth; William Petty; William Cavendish-Bentinck; William Pitt
- Preceded by: Fletcher Norton
- Succeeded by: William Grenville

Personal details
- Born: 15 June 1735 Winchester
- Died: 2 January 1789 (aged 53) London
- Spouse: Elizabeth Jenkinson
- Education: New College, Oxford

Charles Wolfran Cornwall (15 June 1735 – 2 January 1789) was a British politician who sat in the House of Commons from 1768 to 1789. He was Speaker of the House of Commons from 1780 to 1789.

== Origins and early life ==
Charles Wolfran Cornwall was born on 15 June 1735, the only son of Jacobs Cornwall and Elizabeth Forder, and baptised at St Thomas' church in Winchester ten days later. His parents were second cousins, both being great-grandchildren of Humphrey Cornewall, and he was given the names of two other family members: his paternal grandfather Admiral Charles Cornewall and his maternal great-grandfather Captain Wolfran Cornewall. Jacobs Cornwall died the following year, on 8 August 1736.

Despite the naval associations of his namesakes, young Charles Wolfran was raised for a career in the law. He began his education at Winchester in 1748, going on to New College, Oxford. before starting a legal training at Lincoln's Inn in 1755. In 1756, his uncle Sir Robert de Cornwall died childless, leaving him a considerable estate. Perhaps because of this inheritance, he does not appear to have had any considerable amount of legal practice, though he was called to the bar at Gray's Inn in 1757 and became a bencher there in 1770. Instead, he dedicated himself to politics.

== Political career ==
Cornwall's entry into political life was aided by his connection with his cousin, Charles Jenkinson, an association to be much strengthened when he married Jenkinson's sister Elizabeth on 17 August 1764. In 1763 he wrote to his future brother-in-law: "A seat in Parliament is my first object, without that I would not choose to engage in any department of public business." However, he was persuaded instead to become a Commissioner for examining the German Accounts. Occupying this post from 1763 to 1765, he gained a good knowledge of Treasury procedures.

After leaving this post, he began to drift away from Jenkinson politically and move into the circles of the Marquess of Rockingham and of the Earl of Shelburne. The latter was able to satisfy Cornwall's parliamentary ambitions by securing him the seat of Grampound in the election of 1768. He became a frequent speaker in opposition to the government on a variety of subjects, but specialising in issues concerning the East Indies. In 1773, he declined an offer from Lord North of a post in Bengal to supervise and regulate the activities of the East India Company.

Unlike many of his Opposition colleagues, he supported the government response to the American Revolution, stating in the House on 19 April 1774: "We ill hold the title of mother country if we are to do what America says we must do, or desist from doing what America says we must not do." Encouraged by this difference in view, an annual pension of £500 (equivalent to £66,000 in 2025), and a seat on the Treasury Board, he crossed the floor to become part of the Government in 1774. In the election of that year, he was elected to represent Winchelsea, a rotten borough in the gift of the Treasury. He would represent the seat for ten years before transferring to the neighbouring Treasury seat of Rye.

In 1775, he sold the estate at Berrington, which had belonged to his family for ten generations, to fellow MP Thomas Harley. Harley would go on to have Berrington Hall rebuilt by Henry Holland, and its grounds remodelled by Capability Brown.

On 22 September 1780 he was appointed Justice in Eyre north of the Trent, a sinecure with a salary of £100 (equivalent to £16,000 in 2025).

== Speaker of the House ==
Speaker Fletcher Norton had offended George III when giving an address to the King in 1777. Consequently, when the new parliament sat in 1780 the government was determined to replace him, citing grounds of his ill health over the vocal objections of Norton himself. Cornwall was proposed by George Germain and seconded by Welbore Ellis, and elected to the chair on 31 October 1780. The King wrote that he was "a very respectable person for the office of Speaker." Shortly afterwards Cornwall was made a member of the Privy Council.

When in the chair, Cornwall would alleviate the tedium of long debates by drinking draughts of porter that were brought to him from Bellamy's - a refreshment house in Old Palace Yard. This unusual habit was noted in the Rolliad:

There Cornewall sits, and, oh unhappy fate!
Must sit for ever through the long debate
Save, when compelled by Nature's sovereign will,
Sometimes to empty, and sometimes to fill.
Painful pre-eminence! he hears, 'tis true,
Fox, North, and Burke, but hears Sir Joseph too.

Like sad Prometheus, fasten'd to his rock,
In vain he looks for pity to the clock;
In vain the effects of stength'ning porter tries,
And nods to Bellamy for fresh supplies;
While vulture-like, the dire Mahon appears,
And, far more savage, rends his suff'ring ears.

On 27 February 1786, Cornwall used his casting vote to defeat a Government proposal on the fortification of Portsmouth and Plymouth, when the vote was tied at 169 members for and against. This was an early example of what would later become known as Speaker Denison's rule.

According to Nathaniel Wraxall, "Cornwall possessed every physical quality requisite to ornament the place - a sonorous voice, a manly as well as an imposing figure, and a commanding deportment;" though he went on to criticise his drinking. According to the Oxford Dictionary of National Biography "though he never achieved distinction as speaker, his frequent and well-informed interventions from the chair demonstrated initiative and judgement. He called MPs to account for unparliamentary behaviour and ruled on procedural matters, such as allowing the innovation of parliamentary questions in May 1783."

During parliamentary recesses he took up residence at the Master's House of the Hospital of St Cross near Winchester, his own house in Barton Priors proving too small for a Speaker's retinue.

== Death ==
Cornwall was the first Speaker of the House of Commons to die in office. He sat in the Speaker's chair for the last time on 29 December 1788, before falling ill with a "feverish cold." He remained absent from the House for two days, but expected to return soon. On 2 January 1789 the Commons Journal records that "the Clerk at the Table acquainted the House that we was extremely sorry to inform them that Mr Speaker died this morning." An autopsy was carried out where "a large quantity of cold water was found in his stomach; and one of his collar bones turning with a sharp point to his lungs, had formed an abscess and occasioned his death."

He was buried in the chapel of the Hospital of St Cross with a monument by John Francis Moore. The majority of his estate was left to his wife for the rest of her life, and then (as the couple had no children) to the children of his distant cousin Sir George Cornewall.

== Lineage ==
Coat of arms of Charles Wolfran Cornwall
Escutcheon A lion rampant Gules ducally crowned Or within a bordure engrailed sable bezanty.

Ancestry of Charles Wolfran Cornwall

Humphrey Cornewall (1616–1688)	Theophila Skynner (1622–1718)
Robert Cornewall (1647–1705)	Edith Cornewallis (d. 1696)	Elizabeth Humfrey	Wolfran Cornewall (1658–1720)	Elizabeth Devereux (d. 1741)
Charles Cornewall (1669–1718)	Dorothy Hanmer	Robert Forder	Rose Cornewall	Charles Jenkinson (1693–1750)	Amarantha Cornewall (1700–1785)
Sir Robert de Cornwall (1700–1756)	Jacobs Cornwall (1709–1738)	Elizabeth Forder (1707–1783)
Charles Wolfran Cornwall (1735–1789)	Elizabeth Jenkinson (1730–1809)	Charles Jenkinson, 1st Earl of Liverpool (1729–1808)

Note: Many siblings have been omitted in the above chart.

Parliament of Great Britain
Preceded by Merrick Burrell; Simon Fanshaw	Member for Grampound; 1768–1774; With: Grey Cooper	Succeeded by Sir Joseph Yorke; Richard Neville
Preceded by Arnold Nesbitt; William Nedham	Member for Winchelsea; 1774–1784; With: Arnold Nesbitt 1774–75; William Nedham 1775–80; John Nesbitt 1780–84	Succeeded by John Nesbitt; William Nedham
Preceded by William Dickinson; Thomas Onslow	Member for Rye; 1784–1789; With: William Dickinson	Succeeded by William Dickinson; Charles Long
Political offices
Preceded by Fletcher Norton	Speaker of the House of Commons of Great Britain; 1780–1789	Succeeded by William Grenville
Legal offices
Preceded by Thomas, 2nd Lord Lyttelton	Justice in Eyre north of the Trent; 1780–1789	Succeeded by The Viscount Falmouth
