= Robert Monckton-Arundell, 4th Viscount Galway =

British politician

The Right Honourable The Viscount Galway PC KB
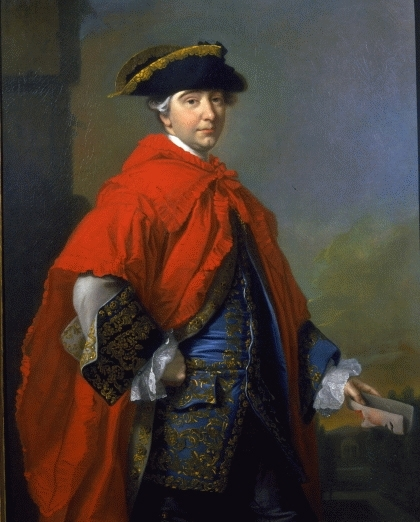
- Portrait by Thomas Hudson, 1779

Member of Parliament for Pontefract
- In office 1801–1802 Serving with John Smyth; Richard Benyon
- Preceded by: Parliament of Great Britain
- Succeeded by: John Smyth
- In office 1796–1801 Serving with John Smyth
- Preceded by: William Sotheron; John Smyth
- Succeeded by: Parliament of the United Kingdom

Member of Parliament for York
- In office 1783–1790 Serving with Lord John Cavendish, Richard Slater Milnes
- Preceded by: Charles Turner; Lord John Cavendish
- Succeeded by: Sir William Mordaunt Milner, Bt; Richard Slater Milnes

Member of Parliament for Pontefract
- In office 1780–1783 Serving with William Nedham
- Preceded by: Sir John Goodricke, Bt; Charles Mellish
- Succeeded by: William Nedham; Nathaniel Smith

Personal details
- Born: Robert Monckton-Arundell; 4 July 1752
- Died: 23 July 1810 (aged 58)
- Spouse(s): Elizabeth Mathew (m. 1779; died 1801) Mary Bridget Milnes Drummond (m. 1803; died 1810)
- Parent(s): William Monckton-Arundell, 2nd Viscount Galway; Elizabeth Villareal

Robert Monckton-Arundell, 4th Viscount Galway, PC KB (4 July 1752 – 23 July 1810) was a British politician.

== Early life ==
He was the second surviving of three sons and two daughters born to William Monckton-Arundell, 2nd Viscount Galway and the former Elizabeth Villareal. His father served as Receiver-General of the Crown rents for Yorkshire, Westmorland and Durham before being returned to Parliament as a Member for Pontefract and Thirsk. Among his siblings were sisters Hon. Elizabeth Monckton (wife of Sir Francis Sykes, 1st Baronet and Sir Drummond Smith, 1st Baronet) and Hon. Frances Charlotte Monckton (wife of Anthony Burlton-Bennett).

His paternal grandparents were John Monckton, 1st Viscount Galway and Lady Elizabeth Manners (a daughter of John Manners, 2nd Duke of Rutland). His maternal grandparents were Joseph Isaac Villareal and Kitty da Costa (a well known English Sephardi Jew who converted to Christianity; she was a daughter of Joseph da Costa, a gold and coral trader who owned Manor of Copped Hall in Totteridge).

He succeeded his elder unmarried brother Henry to the title in 1774.

== Career ==
He was elected Member of Parliament to represent Pontefract from 1780 to 1783, made a Privy Counsellor in 1784 and knighted in the Order of the Bath in 1786. He gave up his seat in 1783 following an appointment by Lord Shelburne as envoy to the Elector Palatine, however, the fall of the Government in March prevented his taking up the appointment. In the subsequent general election, Galway was elected unopposed for the York constituency in 1783, serving until 1790. He spoke and voted against Fox's East India bill, 27 November 1783. He stood unsuccessfully for Pontefract in 1790, but was returned in 1796, serving until he resigned his seat in 1802.

His career also included service as Comptroller of the Household (1784–87) during the reign of King George III.

== Personal life ==
On 1 March 1779, Lord Galway married Elizabeth Mathew (c. 1760–1801), the daughter of Daniel Mathew of Felix Hall, Essex. Elizabeth's sister, Louisa, was the wife of James Gambier, 1st Baron Gambier, and her youngest sister, Jane, was the mother of Sir Edward John Gambier. Before her death on 19 November 1801, they were the parents of five sons and four daughters, including:

- William George Monckton-Arundell, 5th Viscount Galway (1782–1834), who married Catherine Elizabeth Handfield, daughter of Capt. George Handfield, in 1804.
- Hon. Robert Henry Monckton-Arundell (d. 1813)
- Hon. Charles Frederick Monckton-Arundell (d. 1798)
- Hon. Augustus Philip Monckton-Arundell (d. 1802)
- Hon. Carleton Thomas Monckton-Arundell (1797–1830), a Captain of the 22nd Light Dragoons.
- Hon. Elizabeth Mary Monckton-Arundell (d. 1840)
- Hon. Henrietta Maria Monckton-Arundell (d. 1847), who married Robert Pemberton Milnes of Fryston Hall, son of Richard Slater Milnes, in 1808.
- Hon. Charlotte Penelope Monckton-Arundell (d. 1806)
- Hon. Frances Jane Monckton-Arundell (d. 1854)

After the death of his first wife, he married Mary Bridget (née Milnes) Drummond on 24 May 1803. Mary Bridget, the widow of Peter Auriol Hay Drummond (son of Archbishop Robert Hay Drummond and grandson of the 8th Earl of Kinnoull), was the only child and heiress of Pemberton Milnes of Bawtry Hall, Yorkshire (a prosperous wool-merchant from Wakefield) and Jane Slater (a daughter of Dr .Adam Slater). There were no children of this marriage.

Upon his death on 23 July 1810, he was succeeded by his son William. His widow died on 15 November 1835.

=== Descendants ===
Through his daughter Henrietta, he was a grandfather of Henrietta Maria Milnes (who married her cousin George Monckton-Arundell, 6th Viscount Galway), and Richard Monckton Milnes, 1st Baron Houghton (who married Hon. Annabella Crewe, daughter of John Crewe, 2nd Baron Crewe).

Parliament of Great Britain
Preceded by Sir John Goodricke, Bt; Charles Mellish	Member of Parliament for Pontefract; 1780–1783; With: William Nedham	Succeeded by William Nedham; Nathaniel Smith
Preceded by Charles Turner; Lord John Cavendish	Member of Parliament for York; 1783–1790; With: Lord John Cavendish 1783–1784; Richard Slater Milnes 1784–1790	Succeeded by Sir William Mordaunt Milner, Bt; Richard Slater Milnes
Preceded by William Sotheron; John Smyth	Member of Parliament for Pontefract; 1796–1801; With: John Smyth	Succeeded by Parliament of the United Kingdom
Parliament of the United Kingdom
Preceded by Parliament of Great Britain	Member of Parliament for Pontefract; 1801–1802; With: John Smyth	Succeeded by John Smyth; Richard Benyon
Political offices
Preceded by The Earl Ludlow	Comptroller of the Household; 1784–1787	Succeeded by Hon. John Villiers
Peerage of Ireland
Preceded by Henry William Monckton-Arundell	Viscount Galway; 1774–1810	Succeeded by William George Monckton-Arundell
