= James McLean =

James McLean may refer to:

== Sports ==
- James McLean (golfer) (born 1978), Australian professional golfer
- Jim McLean (golfer) (born 1950), American golfer and instructor
- Jim McLean (born 1937), Scottish football player and manager (Dundee United)
- Jim McLean (Australian footballer) (1880–1917), Australian rules footballer (Melbourne FC)
- Jimmy McLean (1934–1995), Scottish footballer
- Jimmy McLean (footballer, born 1876) (1876–1914), English footballer
- Jimmy McLean (footballer, born 1881) (1881–?), Scottish footballer

== Politicians ==
- James Henry McLean (1829–1886), American politician and U.S. Representative for Missouri
- James R. McLean (1842–1903), merchant and politician in Prince Edward Island, Canada
- James Robert McLean (1823–1870), Confederate politician
- James McLean (Arkansas politician), American politician and state legislator in Arkansas
- James McLean (Maryland politician) (died 1956), American politician in Maryland

== Others ==
- James McLean (mobster) (1929–1965), Boston mobster and leader of the Winter Hill Gang
- James Hamilton McLean (born 1936), American malacologist
- James E. McLean, dean of the University of Alabama College of Education
- James Monroe McLean (1818–1890), American insurance executive and banker

== See also ==
- James MacLean (disambiguation)
- James McClean (born 1989), Irish footballer
