= Robert Pemberton Milnes =

- Born: 20 May 1784; Wakefield, Yorkshire, England
- Died: 9 November 1858 (aged 74); Fryston Hall, Wakefield, Yorkshire, England
- Education: Trinity College, Cambridge
- Occupations: Landowner, politician
- Spouse: Henrietta Monckton-Arundell
- Children: Richard Monckton Milnes, 1st Baron Houghton
- Parent(s): Richard Slater Milnes; Rachel Busk
- Relatives: Robert Monckton-Arundell, 4th Viscount Galway (father-in-law)

Robert Pemberton Milnes (20 May 1784 – 9 November 1858), was a British landowner and politician.

== Early life ==
Robert Pemberton Milnes was born on 28 May 1784. He was the eldest son of Richard Slater Milnes, of Fryston Hall, Yorkshire by Rachael, daughter of Hans Busk whose brother was Sir Wadsworth Busk

He was educated at Hackney and at Trinity College, Cambridge. He inherited Fryston Hall, Castleford on the death of his father in 1804. He also inherited Bawtry House near Doncaster, Yorkshire on the death of Bridget, the daughter of Pemberton Milnes, who had built the house in 1795.

== Career ==
Milnes sat as member of parliament for Pontefract between 1806 and 1818.

== Personal life and death ==
Milnes had married the Honourable Henrietta Maria, daughter of Robert Monckton-Arundell, 4th Viscount Galway, in 1808. Their son Richard became a prominent literary figure and was created Baron Houghton in 1863. Henrietta Mary died in May 1847. Milnes remained a widower until his death in November 1858, aged 74.

Parliament of the United Kingdom
Preceded by John Smyth; Richard Benyon	Member of Parliament for Pontefract; 1806–1818; With: John Smyth 1806–1807; Viscount Pollington 1807–1812, 1812–1818; Henry Lascelles 1812	Succeeded by Viscount Pollington; Thomas Houldsworth
