= Richard Milnes =

Richard Milnes may refer to:

- Richard Slater Milnes (1759–1804), English heir, landowner and politician
- Richard Monckton Milnes, 1st Baron Houghton (1809–1885), English poet, patron of literature and politician
