= Robert Fletcher (East India Company officer) =

Sir Robert Fletcher MP
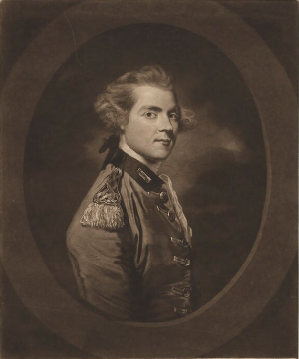
- Sir Robert Fletcher c.1774-76

Member of Parliament for Cricklade
- In office 16 March 1768 – 1774
- Preceded by: Arnold Nesbitt; Thomas Gore
- Succeeded by: Arnold Nesbitt; William Earle

Personal details
- Born: c.1738
- Died: 24 December 1776 Mauritius

Military service
- Allegiance: (Kingdom of Great Britain) Great Britain; East India Company
- Branch/service: Madras Army
- Years of service: 1757-1776
- Rank: Brigadier general
- Commands: Madras Army (1772-72 & 1775-76)

Sir Robert Fletcher (c. 1738 – 24 December 1776) was an officer of the East India Company and a member of parliament for Cricklade. Fletcher joined the East India Company as a junior clerk in 1757 but soon transferred to its army. As a lieutenant he was cashiered (dismissed) for insolence but was later restored. Fletcher was awarded a knighthood for gallantry in battle and rose in rank to lieutenant-colonel in command of a brigade. He was court-martialled and cashiered for the second time by Robert Clive for involvement in the 1766 Monghyr Mutiny.

Returning to Britain Fletcher, during the 1768 general election, stood unsuccessfully at Malmesbury before finding a seat at Cricklade. In parliament, he opposed the government of William Pitt before he was restored to service with the East India Company after the intercession of a fellow MP. He afterwards voted in support of the government.

Fletcher returned to India in 1772 to command the Madras Army. He soon came into conflict with the presidency's governor Josias Du Pre, after which Fletcher chose to leave India and return to Britain. He considered standing at the 1774 British general election but withdrew the day before the poll. Returning to India in 1775, Fletcher again came into conflict with the governor, Lord Pigot, which culminated in Pigot's arrest. Sick with tuberculosis, Fletcher undertook a sea voyage to convalesce but died at Mauritius during his travels.

== Early life and career ==
Robert Fletcher was born circa 1738 to Robert Fletcher and Elizabeth Fletcher (née Lyon). During his youth his father served as a major in Lord Ogilvy's regiment of the Jacobite Army during the rising of 1745. After the defeat of the Jacobites, he fled to Bergen, Norway and did not return to Scotland until 1754.

The young Robert Fletcher was appointed a writer (Note: A writer was a type of clerk employed by the company to record information) in the service of the East India Company at Madras in May 1757. He transferred to the company's army as an ensign in September and was promoted to lieutenant. He was cashiered (dismissed from the service) for insolence, but the intervention of senior officer Eyre Coote restored him to his position. Fletcher, who served during the Seven Years' War, was promoted to captain in 1760. He returned to England in 1763 and was knighted on 29 December for his gallantry in action. He was promoted to major in 1764 and lieutenant-colonel in 1765. He returned to India in command of a brigade and was implicated in the 1766 Monghyr Mutiny. Court-martialled and cashiered again by Robert Clive, he returned to England.

== Political career ==
Upon his return Fletcher sought a seat in Parliament. After first considering Bridport in Dorset he stood, with William Mayne, for the two seats at Malmesbury in the 1768 British general election. The pair garnered just two votes apiece (out of 13 electors) to the 11 won by the Earl of Donegall and Thomas Howard. Undaunted he passed through Cricklade, Wiltshire, just days before the election there and, finding a relative of Clive had declined a seat there, won it on 16 March 1768 without any expenditure whatsoever. The seat is thought to have cost him £4,000 in promised payments to the electors. The second seat went to George Damer, son of the wealthy Lord Milton.

In parliament Fletcher voted generally in support of the opposition to the government of William Pitt but primarily acted in the interest of his restoration to the East India Company. He had failed to achieve this, by some 30 votes, at the company's General court earlier in the year. Fellow MP George Grenville interceded on his behalf with Clive, who dropped his opposition, and on 15 December 1769 Fletcher was reinstated and promoted to colonel. Though formally posted to Madras, he did not sail until 1771 and in the meantime came to support the government in parliament.

== First return to India ==
Upon arrival in 1772 Fletcher assumed command of the Madras Army from Brigadier General Joseph Smith. Within months Fletcher was in conflict with the company's governor of Madras Josias Du Pre. This came to a head in January 1773 when Du Pre dismissed Fletcher from the council and ordered him to Trichinopoly to keep him out of the city. Fletcher took the opportunity, in March 1773, to leave India. Around this time he wrote to friends in England to ask them to lobby for his appointment as Commander-in-Chief, India, which was not successful.

Fletcher took part in parliamentary business in 1774, including voting against extending the Parliamentary Elections Act 1770 perpetually. He stated in the House of Commons on 28 February that he would press for an inquiry into the business of the East India Company. The Company afterwards re-engaged his services, promoting him to brigadier-general in April 1774 and posting him to Madras once more. Fletcher postponed travelling to contest Cricklade at the 1774 British general election but withdrew the day before the poll. He married Anne Pybus, the daughter of a banker, on 17 December 1774.

== Second return to India ==
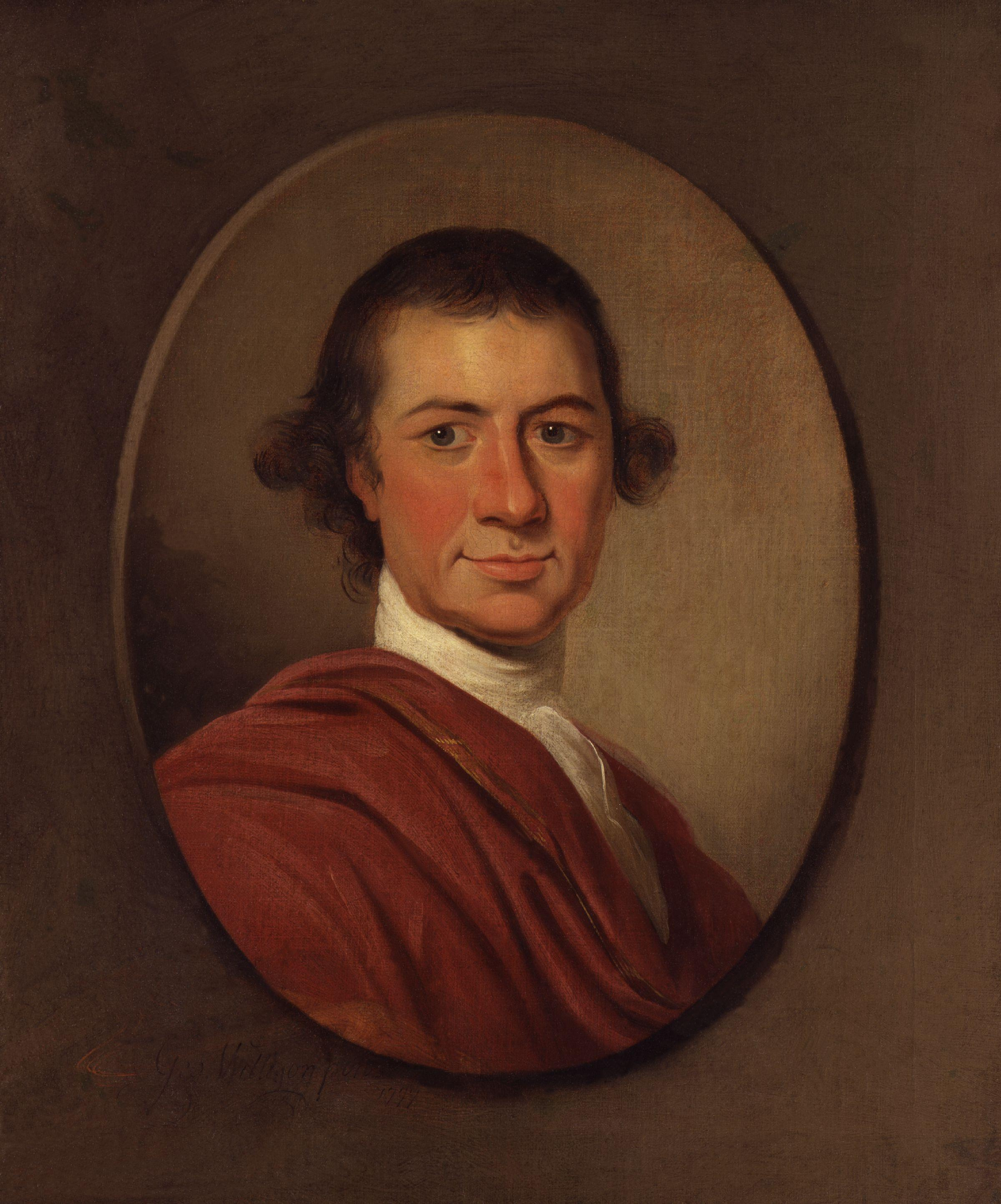
Lord Pigot, depicted in 1777

Fletcher arrived in Madras in June 1775 and soon came into conflict with the governor, now Lord Pigot. In October 1775 he once again assumed the role of Commander of the Madras Army and received, ex officio, a seat on the council of the Madras Presidency.

Fletcher was among the majority of the council that opposed Pigot, and after Pigot expelled the opposition and took possession of Fort St. George he was arrested by the opposition. Fletcher, who was then ill with tuberculosis, left India in October 1776 aboard the Greenwich on a journey of convalescence. He died at Mauritius on 24 December. In April 1777 George III, unaware of Fletcher's death, wrote "Sir Robert Fletcher appears with his usual inclination to disputes" with regards the Pigot affair. Fletcher left a large fortune that allegedly included a large parcel of pearls from an Indian nawab.

== Notes ==
Preceded by Arnold Nesbitt; Thomas Gore	Member of Parliament for Cricklade; 1768–1774; With: Hon. George Damer	Succeeded by Arnold Nesbitt; William Earle
