= John Smyth (1748–1811) =

British politician

John Smyth (12 February 1748 – 12 February 1811) was a British politician who sat in the House of Commons from 1783 to 1807.

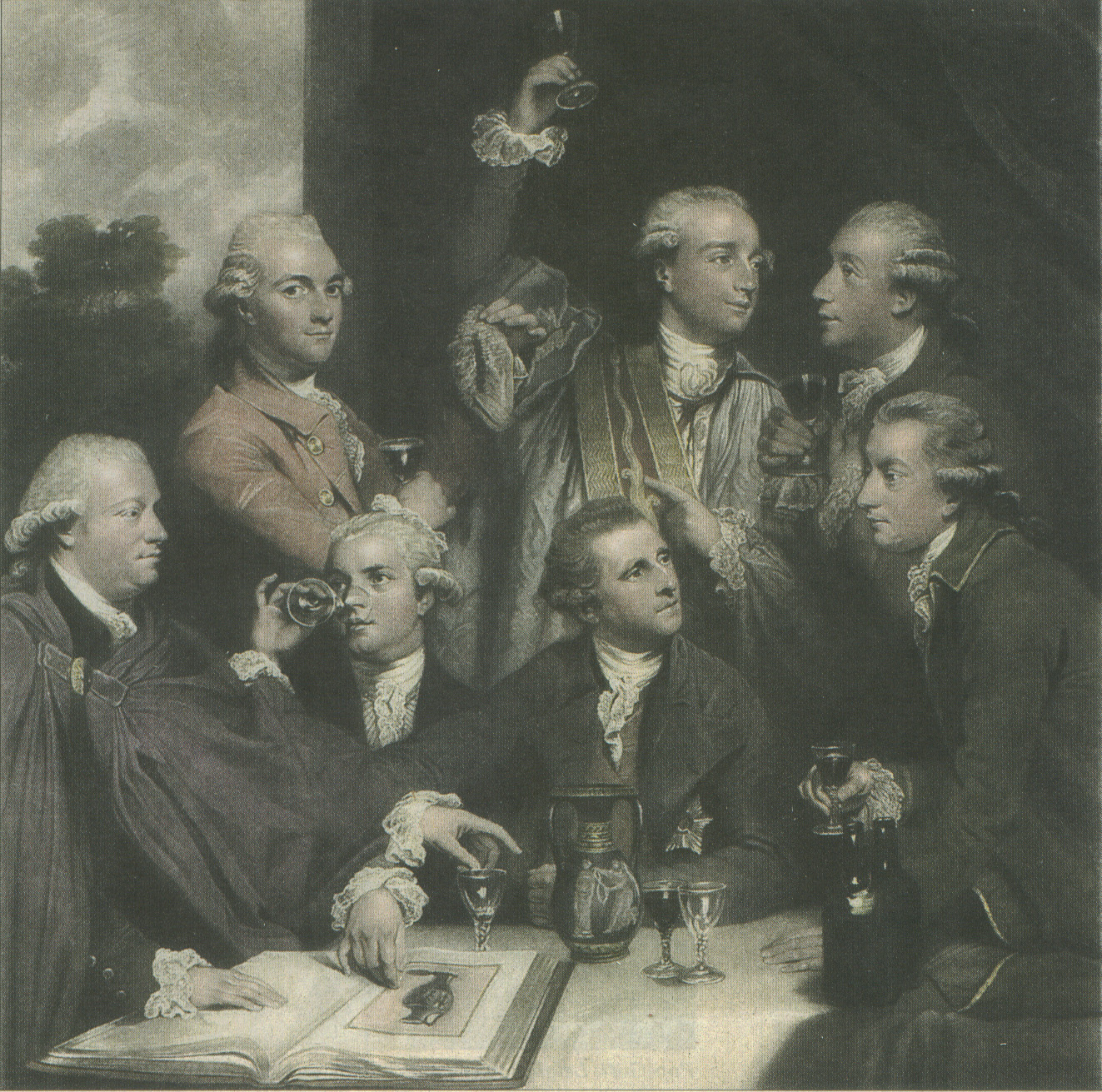
John Smyth features in this group portrait of the Dilettanti Society. The others are: Sir William Hamilton, Stephen Payne-Gallwey, Walter Spencer-Stanhope, Sir John Taylor, Bart., Richard Thompson and Sir Watkin Williams-Wynn. Hamilton (centre, with his Order of the Bath star visible) is showing the vase to Smyth on the right.

== Early life ==
Smyth was the son of John Smyth of Heath Hall, Heath, West Yorkshire and his wife Bridget Foxley, daughter of Benjamin Foxley of London. He was educated at Westminster School and was admitted at Trinity College, Cambridge in 1766.

== Career ==
Smyth served in Parliament as Member of Parliament for Pontefract from 1783 to 1807. He was a Lord of the Admiralty, from 1791 to 1794, and a Lord of the Treasury, from 1794 1802. He was Master of the Mint from 1802 to 1804, and a Commissioner of the Board of Trade in 1805.

== Personal life ==
In 1778, Smyth married Lady Georgiana FitzRoy, eldest daughter of Augustus Henry FitzRoy, 3rd Duke of Grafton. Together, they had four sons and two daughters. Their son

- John Henry Smyth, of Heath Hall (1780-1822), member of parliament for Cambridge, had issue
  - John George Smyth, of Heath Hall, who had issue
    - Diana Elizabeth Smyth, who married Henry Lascelles, 4th Earl of Harewood (1824-1892) and had issue
      - Edwin Harry Lascelles (1861-1924)
      - Daniel Harry Lascelles (1862-1904)
      - George Algernon Lascelles (1865-1932), who married Mabel Caroline Elcocke Massey (died 1951) and had issue
        - Sybil Mary Lascelles (1907-1981), who married Humphrey Bradshaw Mellor Wright (1907-1997)
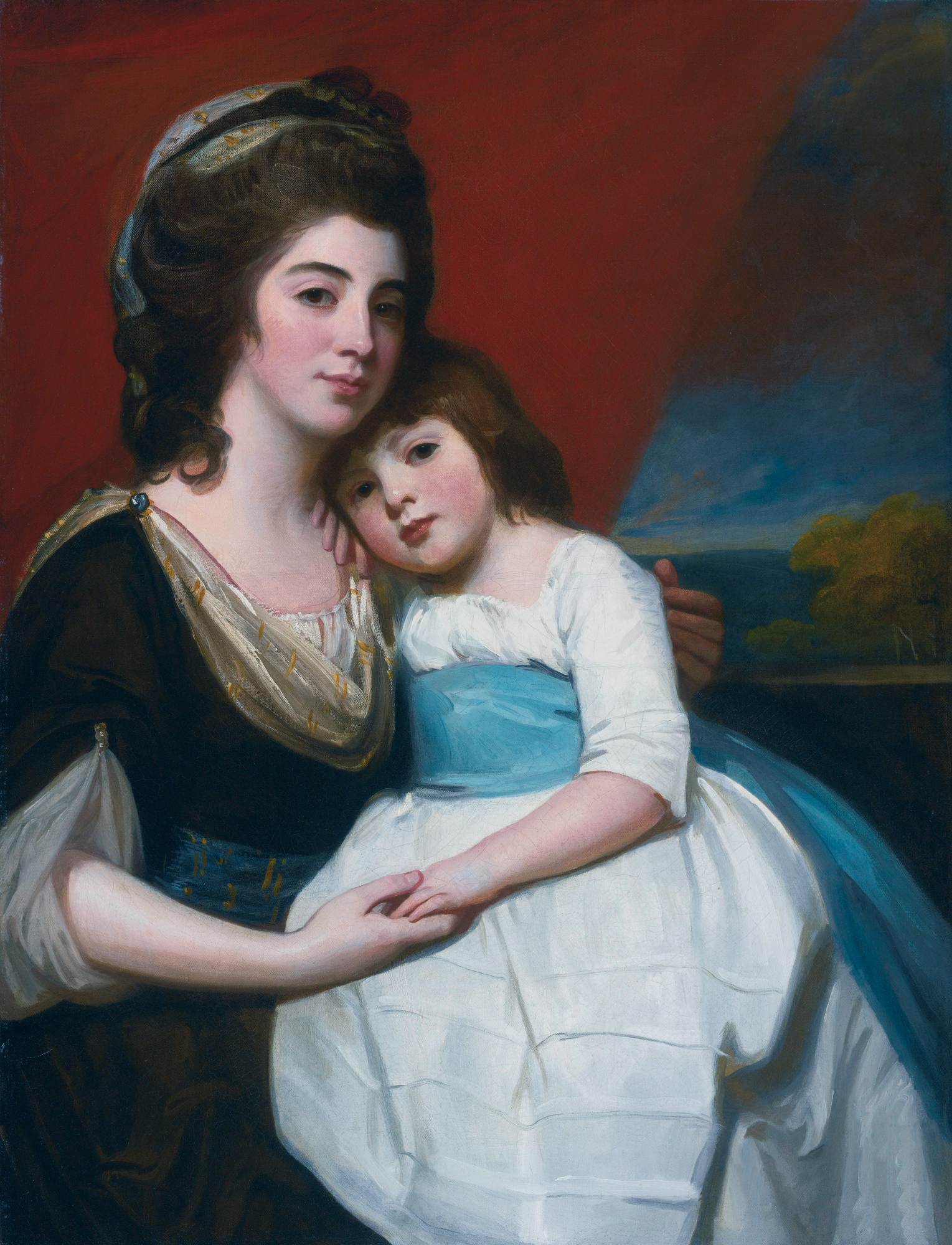
          Lady Georgiana Smyth (circa 1757–1799) and her son (George Romney, 1783)
      - William Horace Lascelles (1868-1949), who married Madeline Barton (died 1950) and had issue
        - Mary Madge Lascelles (1900-1995)
        - Sir Daniel William Lascelles (1902-1967)
        - Pamela Diana Lascelles (1902-1988)
        - Susan Olivia Lascelles (1907-1995)
        - John Edward Lascelles (1911-1955)
      - Francis John Lascelles (1871-1925), who married Gertie Stradling, and had issue
        - Norah Gertrude Lascelles (1906-1972)
      - Eric James Lascelles (1873-1901)
      - Lady Susan Elizabeth Lascelles (1860-1925), who married Francis Richard Sutton
      - Lady Mary Lascelles (1877-1930), who married Robert Wentworth Doyne and had issue
        - Robert Harry Doyne (1899-1965), who married first Verena Seymour and second (1947) Nancy Butler and had issue
          - Patrick Robert Doyne (born 1936)
          - Diana Victoria Mary Doyne (born 1933), who married Robert Stephen Laurie
          - Bridget Cecilia Doyne (1949-2013)
  - Major-General Henry Smyth (-1816), CB, married Rebecca Mary, daughter of Thomas Peirce, and had issue
    - William John Smyth (1869-) of the Indian Civil Service, married Lilian May, daughter of Capt. Henry Clifford, RN, and had issue
      - Sir John George Smyth, 1st Baronet, VC MC, married and had issue
      - Herbert Edward FitzRoy Smyth, married and had issue
      - Lt-Col Henry Malcolm Smyth, of the 9th Gurkhas, also of MI6, the Special Police Corps, Germany, and Shanghai International Police, OBE
  - Maria Isabella Smyth (-1889), married her cousin Robert FitzRoy and had issue
    - Laura Maria Elizabeth FitzRoy (1858-1943), who died unmarried
  - Elizabeth Sarah Smyth, married Abraham Robarts, and had issue
    - Abraham John Robarts (1838-1926), who married Edith Barrington and had issue
      - Mary Edith Robarts (1870-1948), who married John Abdy Combe (1863-1929)
      - John Robarts (1872-1954), who married Margaret Georgina Louisa Cholmeley (1875-1967)
      - Gerald Robarts (1878-1961), who married Florence Fletcher and had issue
        - David John Robarts (1906-1989), chairman of the National Provincial Bank, married and had issue
        - Anthony Vere Cyprian Robarts (1910-1982), married Grizel Mary Grant (1914-2004) and had issue
        - Peter Gerald Robarts (1915-1951)
  - Frances Smyth (-1892), married the politician Lt-Col Thomas Wood and had issue three sons and four daughters
  - Louisa Georgiana Smith (-1842), married Gervase Parker Bushe

Smyth died 12 February 1811 in London.

Parliament of Great Britain
Preceded by William Nedham; Nathaniel Smith	Member of Parliament for Pontefract; 1783–1807; With: William Nedham; William Sotheron; 4th Viscount Galway; Richard Benyon; Robert Pemberton Milnes	Succeeded by Robert Pemberton Milnes; Viscount Pollington
