= John Macpherson (minister) =

Scottish minister and antiquarian (1710–1765)

John Macpherson (1710–1765) was a Scottish minister and antiquarian.

== Life ==
The son of Dugald Macpherson, minister at Duirinish, Skye, he studied classics at Aberdeen University, graduating M.A. 1728, and D.D. 1761. He was minister of Barra in the Outer Hebrides, 1734 to 1742, and of Sleat on Skye, from 1742 to 1765.

== Works ==
Macpherson published Critical Dissertations on the Origin, Antiquities, Language, Government, Manners, Religion of the Ancient Caledonians, their Posterity, the Picts, and the British and Irish Scots, London, 1768. This work on the Ossian controversy upheld the authenticity of the poems attributed to Ossian. Though not closely related, James Macpherson, author of "The Works of Ossian" (1765), and John Macpherson knew each other well. It has been suggested that they were complicit in the creation of the works. John Macpherson's "Ancient Caledonians" were from Gaul, ancestors of the Picts, Scots and Irish, a theory also adopted by James Macpherson.

Critical Dissertations also attacked contemporary historians of Scotland, particularly William Robertson. Macpherson claimed to have heard a recitation of Ossianic verse by a Gaelic bard; the poet in question has been identified, tentatively, as Dòmhnall MacMhuirich (fl. 1707–1740s), last representative of the MacMhuirich bardic family.

Macpherson paraphrased the Song of Moses in Latin verse, published in The Scots Magazine. In the debate on second sight, with a cousin, Martin Macpherson of Golspie, he attacked "Theophilus Isolanus", pseudonymous author of a treatise on the topic, real name Donald Macleod.

== Family ==
Macpherson married Janet, daughter of Donald Macleod of Bernera. Their elder son Martin Macpherson (1743–1812), succeeded his father at Sleat, and was visited by Samuel Johnson. Sir John Macpherson, 1st Baronet was the younger son.

== Notes ==
Attribution

This article incorporates text from a publication now in the public domain: "Macpherson, John (1745-1821)". Dictionary of National Biography. London: Smith, Elder & Co. 1885–1900. (in the article about his son)
