= New Fryston =

Village in West Yorkshire, England

Coordinates: 53.738722°N 1.313343°W

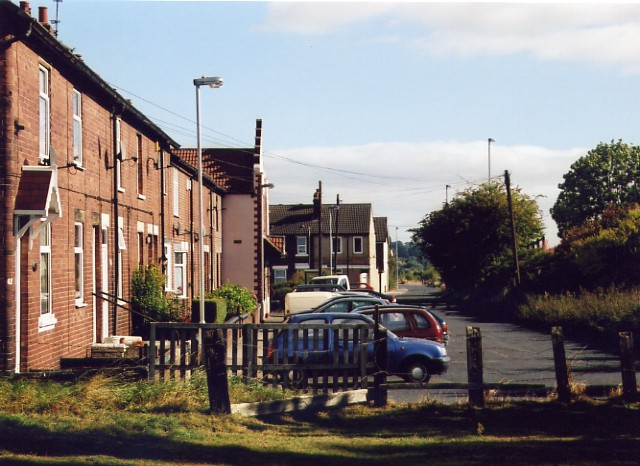
- South Street

- Location within West Yorkshire
- Metropolitan borough: Wakefield
- Metropolitan county: West Yorkshire
- Region: Yorkshire and the Humber
- Country: England
- Sovereign state: United Kingdom
- Police: West Yorkshire
- Fire: West Yorkshire
- Ambulance: Yorkshire

New Fryston is a small former coal mining village in Castleford, in the Wakefield district, in West Yorkshire, England, located in a river bend on the south bank of the River Aire.

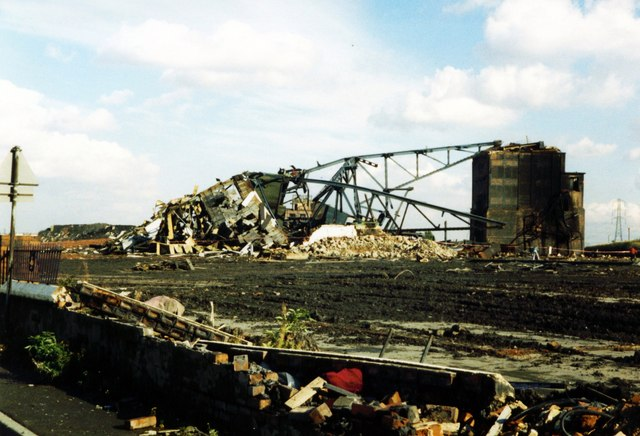
Demolition of the winding tower, September 1985

The colliery opened in the 1870s in the grounds of the now-demolished Fryston Hall and was named Fryston, and the village was built in the 1880s to house some of the miners. At its peak, the pit employed around 1,300 miners. It closed in 1985. After the pit's closure, the colliery buildings were demolished.

The settlement is also called Fryston village.

In 2005, a re-generation programme called the Castleford Project, carried out a number of re-developments in Fryston including what turned out to be a controversial new Village Green; these re-developments were the subject of a series of television programmes on Channel 4.

== See also ==
- List of Yorkshire Pits
- Richard Monckton Milnes, 1st Baron Houghton
