= Richard Crowle =

British politician

Richard Crowle (15 July 1699 – 21 June 1757) was a Yorkshire lawyer and a Member of Parliament for the Kingston upon Hull parliamentary constituency.

He was a grandson of Alderman George Crowle, who was sheriff of Kingston upon Hull in 1657, and Mayor of Hull in 1661 and 1679, and a son of William Crowle, of Springhead, a merchant who served as chamberlain of the borough of Hull in 1688 and 1689. Their sister Elisabeth married Daniel Wilson, another MP. Richard was educated at Beverley and St John's College, Oxford before entering the Inner Temple to study law. He was called to the bar in 1724.

He was an unsuccessful candidate in 1747 to succeed his brother George Crowle as the M.P. for Hull, but was elected in 1754 and served until 1757.

He had married Elizabeth, the daughter of John Pearman, a London timber merchant, and had one son. They lived at Fryston Hall, West Yorkshire.
