= Percy Wyndham-O'Brien, 1st Earl of Thomond =

Anglo-Irish Earl (c.1713-1774)

Percy Wyndham-O'Brien

Member of the British House of Commons
- In office 1745–1774
- Preceded by: John Buck
- Succeeded by: William Nedham
- Constituency: Taunton (1745-1747); Minehead (1747-1754); Cockermouth (1754-1761); Winchelsea (1761); Minehead (1761-1768); Winchelsea (1768-1774)

Personal details
- Born: c. 1713
- Died: 1774 (aged c. 61)
- Party: Whig
- Parent: William Wyndham

Arms of O'Brien: Quarterly of 4: 1&4: Gules, three lions passant guardant in pale per pale or and argent (O'Brien); 2nd: Or, (perhaps argent), three piles conjoined in point gules; 3rd: Or, a pheon azure (Sydney?)

Percy Wyndham-O'Brien, 1st Earl of Thomond (c. 1713 – 1774) was a British Member of Parliament and an Irish peer.

== Origins ==
He was the younger of the two sons of Tory statesman Sir William Wyndham, 3rd Baronet (c.1688–1740) of Orchard Wyndham, Somerset, Secretary at War in 1712, Chancellor of the Exchequer in 1713 and Tory leader in the House of Commons during the reign of King George I (1714–1727) and during the early years of King George II (1727–1760). His mother was Catherine Seymour, daughter of Charles Seymour, 6th Duke of Somerset (1662–1748), and sister of Algernon Seymour, 7th Duke of Somerset (1684–1750), created in 1749 Earl of Egremont and Baron Cockermouth, with special remainder to his nephew Charles Wyndham (1710–1763), Percy's elder brother, who duly became 2nd Earl of Egremont in 1750.

== Inheritance ==
Wyndham's Name Act 1741
- Act of Parliament
- Parliament of Great Britain
- Long title: An Act to enable Percy Wyndham Esquire, and other the Devisees of Henry Earl of Thomond and Viscount Tadcaster, deceased, to take and use the Surname of Obrien, pursuant to the Will of the said Earl of Thomond and Viscount Tadcaster.
- Citation: 15 Geo. 2. c. 17 Pr.
- Territorial extent: Great Britain

Dates
- Royal assent: 15 April 1742
- Commencement: 16 November 1742 (Note: Start of session.)

Status: Current legislation

When Percy was 28 years old in 1741, Henry O'Brien, 8th Earl of Thomond died without issue and in his will left all his Irish estates to him as the younger son of his wife's sister. In compliance with the terms of the bequest, Percy took the additional surname name of O'Brien, this was done by a private act of Parliament, Wyndham's Name Act 1741 (15 Geo. 2. c. 17 Pr.). On 11 December 1756, he was created Earl of Thomond and Baron Ibracken (the second creation).

== Career ==
He was educated at St Mary Hall, Oxford. He was MP for of Taunton, Somerset, from 1745 to 1747 when he was succeeded by his elder brother Sir Charles Wyndham, 4th Baronet (1710–1763), who would succeed as 2nd Earl of Egremont three years later in 1750. He was MP for Minehead, Somerset, 1747–1754 and MP for Cockermouth, Cumberland, 1754–1761, (Cockermouth and nearby Egremont were parts of the ancient Cumberland estate of the Percy Earls of Northumberland, whose heir was Algernon Seymour, 7th Duke of Somerset (1684–1750), whose co-heir (to these estates and to Petworth House) was his elder nephew Charles Wyndham, (Percy's brother). Percy Wyndham was later MP for Winchelsea between 1768 and 1774.

== Death and succession ==
When Percy died unmarried and without issue in 1774, the earldom again became extinct. His estates passed to his nephew George O'Brien Wyndham, 3rd Earl of Egremont (1751–1837), of Petworth House, Sussex, and Orchard Wyndham.

== Notes ==
Parliament of Great Britain
Preceded by Sir John Chapman, Bt; John Buck	Member of Parliament for Taunton; 1745–1747; With: Sir John Chapman, Bt	Succeeded by Sir Charles Wyndham; Robert Webb
Preceded by Thomas Carew; John Periam	Member of Parliament for Minehead; 1747–1754; With: Charles Whitworth	Succeeded by Charles Whitworth; Daniel Boone
Preceded by Sir John Mordaunt; William Finch	Member of Parliament for Cockermouth; 1754–1761; With: Sir John Mordaunt	Succeeded by Sir John Mordaunt; Charles Jenkinson
Preceded by Arnold Nesbitt; Thomas Orby Hunter	Member of Parliament for Winchelsea; 1761; With: Thomas Orby Hunter	Succeeded by Thomas Orby Hunter; Thomas Sewell
Preceded by Charles Whitworth; Daniel Boone	Member of Parliament for Minehead; 1761–1768; With: Henry Shiffner	Succeeded by Henry Fownes-Luttrell; Sir Charles Whitworth
Preceded by Thomas Orby Hunter; Thomas Sewell	Member of Parliament for Winchelsea; 1768–1774; With: Thomas Orby Hunter 1768–70; Arnold Nesbitt 1770–74	Succeeded by Arnold Nesbitt; William Nedham
Political offices
Preceded by The Viscount Bateman	Treasurer of the Household; 1757–1761	Succeeded by The Earl of Powis
Preceded by James Grenville	Cofferer of the Household; 1761–1765	Succeeded by The Earl of Scarbrough
Honorary titles
Preceded by The Earl Poulett	Lord Lieutenant of Somerset; 1764–1774	Succeeded by Lord North
Peerage of Ireland
New creation	Earl of Thomond; 1756–1774	Extinct
