= Samuel Peach =

Samuel Peach (1725–1790) was a London merchant and politician who sat in the House of Commons from 1775 to 1776.

Peach was the son of John Peach of Chalford, Gloucestershire and his wife Sarah Small of Minchinhampton. He became a silk merchant in London, and also became a partner in the banking firm of Peach, Fowler and Co. He married Christina Cox, daughter of Howard Cox of Bristol and Virginia on 9 December 1756. From 1773 to 1774 he was a Director of the East India Company. His brother-in-law was the famous astronomer James Bradley.

In December 1774 there was a vacant Parliamentary seat at Cricklade and Peach stood at the by-election on the interest of Arnold Nesbitt. The process then dragged on for over a year, mainly due to the partiality of the returning officer towards Peach. At the first by-election the returning officer closed the poll early and sent in a double return. The election was declared void by the House of Commons. At the second by-election in February 1775 the returning officer disqualified 108 of his opponent's votes. Peach was initially returned as Member of Parliament on 4 March 1775 but there was a petition and he was unseated on 19 February 1776.

Peach was a Director of the East India Company again from 1776 to 1779. In 1777, he was involved in the prosecution of Dr. Dodd, who was subsequently hanged for forgery. In 1780, Peach contested Hindon but was defeated. He was Director of the East India Company in 1781, but then went bankrupt and was disqualified.

He died on 14 December 1790. Peach had a cousin, also Samuel Peach, a merchant of Bristol whose daughter married Henry Cruger, MP.

Parliament of Great Britain
Preceded by William Earle; Arnold Nesbitt	Member of Parliament for Cricklade; 1775–1776; With: Arnold Nesbitt	Succeeded by John Dewar; Arnold Nesbitt
