= Wolfran Cornewall =

Captain Wolfran Cornewall
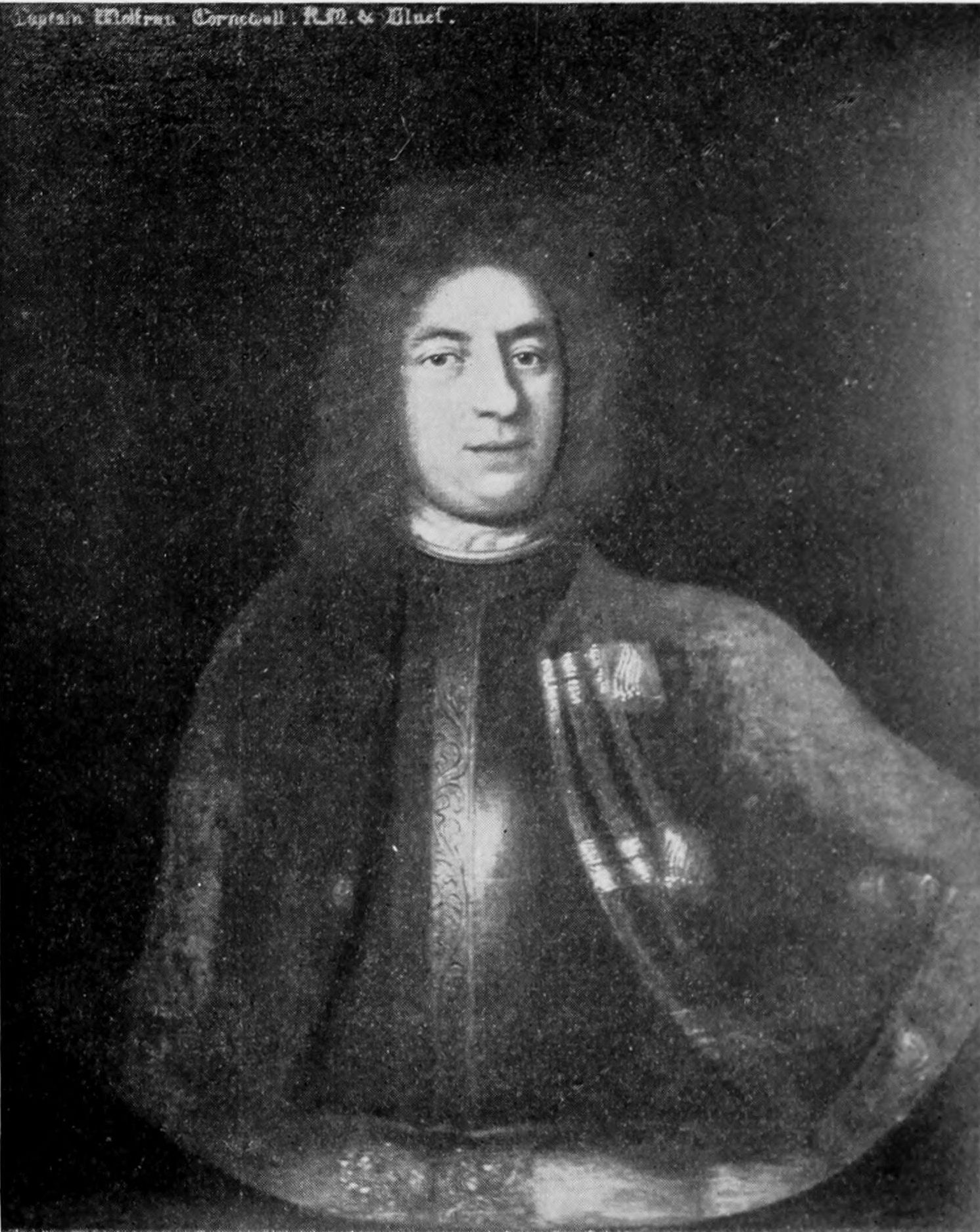
- Wolfran Cornewall, by an unknown artist
- Born: about 1653
- Died: 21 January 1720 (aged 66–67)
- Burial place: Bath Abbey
- Military career
- Allegiance: Kingdom of England
- Branch: Royal Navy
- Service years: 1679–1697
- Rank: Captain
- Commands: HMS Dartmouth; HMS Constant Warwick; HMS Swallow; HMS Suffolk; HMS Royal Katherine; HMS Sandwich; HMS St Andrew
- Conflicts: Nine Years' War

Captain Wolfran Cornewall (about 1653 – 21 January 1720) was an officer in the Royal Navy.

== Origins ==
He was born about 1653, the fifth son of Humphrey Cornewall MP and his wife Theophila Skynner (1622–1718).

== Career ==
Cornewall began his career in the army, joining the Duke of Monmouth's Regiment as an ensign on 12 June 1679, transferring to Colonel Kirke's Regiment in Tangier in 1681. He seems also to have served in the navy around this time, being appointed lieutenant aboard HMS Tyger on 30 January 1682. Returning to the army, he was appointed Ensign in the Duke of York's Regiment on 2 May 1684 before transferring to the cavalry as a Cornet in the Royal Horse Guards later that year. In 1687 he was promoted to the rank of lieutenant in the same regiment.

By 1688 he had switched back to the navy, and was given command of HMS Dartmouth on 23 August that year. On 26 November 1688 he was briefly appointed to HMS Constant Warwick, before being put in charge of HMS Swallow on 23 December 1688. The following year he escorted convoys to Ireland, then in the grip of the Williamite War. In April 1689 the Swallow escorted a convoy under the orders of Colonel Cunningham in a landing of two regiments at Derry, and was a member of the council of war that decided to abandon the expedition. In late May and early June the Swallow, together with HMS Bonaventure and HMS Dartmouth) escorted a convoy under the orders of Major-General Percy Kirke. In September Cornewall came ashore and took part as a volunteer assaulting the breach during the Siege of Cork under the orders of the then Earl of Marlborough.

In 1690 he was given command of HMS Suffolk and took part in the Battle of Beachy Head on 30 June, at which action he "behaved with the greatest gallantry." Despite this, he somehow inspired the disfavour of William III and was removed from his command, causing Admiral Edward Russell to write to the King on his behalf:

I have a request to make you on behalf of Capt. (Wolfran) Cornwall, one of the officers on whom you showed your displeasure, in giving command to dispossess him of his ship, which has been so great a punishment to him. He is not only a very good officer, but an extremely gallant gentleman. I hope you will allow me to put him into a noble ship for this summer's service. He was one of the first sea officers I trusted with your coming over, and he is a man of merit, and I will answer for the character I have given him.

The request was granted, and Cornewall was given command of HMS Royal Katherine in 1691. The following year he commanded HMS Sandwich and was engaged at the Battle of Barfleur on 19 May 1692. Still aboard this vessel the following year, he was one of the seconds to Vice admiral Matthew Aylmer. In recognition of his services, he was given command of a troop of his old regiment, the Royal Horse Guards, in 1693.

In 1694 he was given his final command, the 100 gun first-rate HMS St Andrew, and was second-in-command to Rear admiral Edward Whitaker in 1696. At the Peace of Ryswick in 1697 he retired, and lived out his life on a pension equivalent to a first-rate captain's pay.

== Marriage and children ==
Cornewall married twice. His first wife was Elizabeth Humfrey, with whom he had a daughter:

- Rose Cornewall, married Robert Forder and was the maternal grandmother of Charles Wolfran Cornwall.

His second wife was Elizabeth Devereux (died 1741) with whom he had two more daughters:

- Amarantha Cornewall (1700–1785), married Colonel Charles Jenkinson (1693–1750) and was mother of Charles Jenkinson, 1st Earl of Liverpool
- Bette Cornewall (born 1705)

His great-grandson was Robert Jenkinson, the 23rd Prime Minister of the United Kingdom.

He died on 21 January 1720, and is commemorated with a stone in the nave of Bath Abbey.
