= Sir John Chapman, 2nd Baronet =

British parliamentarian

Sir John Chapman, 2nd Baronet (c. 1710 – 29 January 1781) was a British parliamentarian.

== Biography ==
He succeeded to the Baronetcy in May 1737.

He was elected at the 1741 general election as a Member of Parliament (MP) for Taunton, and held the seat until the 1741 general election, when he did not stand again. He served as High Sheriff of Hertfordshire for 1759.

He married twice: firstly Rachel, daughter and coheir of James Edmondson and secondly Sarah. He had no children and was succeeded by his brother, Sir William Chapman, 3rd Baronet.

Parliament of Great Britain
Preceded by Henry Berkeley Portman; Francis Fane	Member of Parliament for Taunton; 1741–1747; With: John Buck 1741–1745; Percy Wyndham-O'Brien 1745–1747	Succeeded by Charles Wyndham; Robert Webb
Baronetage of Great Britain
Preceded by William Chapman	Baronet (of London); 1737–1781	Succeeded by William Chapman
