= Thomas Orby Hunter =

MP for Winchelsea

The Right Honourable Thomas Orby Hunter

Member of Parliament for Winchelsea
- In office 1741 – January 1759
- In office 5 April 1760 – 20 October 1769

Lord Admiralty
- In office November 1756 – April 1757
- In office July 1757 – April 1763

Lord of the Treasury
- In office April 1763 – July 1765

Personal details
- Born: c. 1716
- Died: 20 October 1769
- Spouse: Jacomina Caroline
- Parents: Robert Hunter (father); Elizabeth (mother)

Thomas Orby Hunter (c. 1716 – 20 October 1769) was the MP for Winchelsea from 1741 till 1759 and 1760 till 1769.

== Early life ==
Thomas Orby Hunter was the only son of Major General Robert Hunter, governor of New York and Jamaica and Elizabeth Orby, the daughter of Sir Thomas Orby, 1st Baronet. He inherited Crowland Abbey, Lincolnshire, as part of the estate of the last of the Orby baronets.

== Career ==
He was deputy paymaster of the forces in Flanders from 1742 to 1748. In 1748, he was commissary to France.

He was Lord Admiralty from November 1756 to April 1757 and from July 1757 till April 1763. From December 1758 till April 1760, he was superintendent of supplies to the allied armies in Germany and Lord of the Treasury from April 1763 till July 1765.

In 1746, Hunter became chief at William Pitt the Elder's pay office. In October 1756, Hunter was appointed a Lord of the Admiralty during the Pitt–Devonshire ministry and the Pitt–Newcastle ministry.

On 22 February 1766, he voted against the repeal of the Stamp Act 1765. On 27 February 1767, he voted against the Chatham ministry on the land tax. On 17 February 1768, he voted against the nullum tempus bill. At the 1768 general election, he aligned himself with Lord Thomond's Egremont policies,

== Personal life ==
On 4 April 1749, he married Jacomina Caroline Bullenden, the daughter of Colonel William Bullenden. They had three children:

- Charles Orby Hunter (d. 1791), who married Elizabeth Howard, daughter of George Howard.
- James Orby Hunter (d. 1756), who died young.
- George Orby Hunter (d. 1756), who died young.

He died on 20 October 1769.

Preceded by Robert Bristow; Edmund Hungate Beaghan	Member of Parliament for Winchelsea; 1741–1754; With: The Viscount Doneraile; Lieutenant Colonel John Mordaunt; Arnold Nesbitt	Succeeded by Lieutenant Colonel George Gray
Preceded by Lieutenant Colonel George Gray	Member of Parliament for Winchelsea; 1760–1768; With: Arnold Nesbitt; The Earl of Thomond; Sir Thomas Sewell	Succeeded by Arnold Nesbitt
