= John Strange (diplomat) =

English diplomat (1732–1799)

John Strange (1732–1799) was an English diplomat and writer.

== Biography ==
He was the second and only surviving son of Sir John Strange, by his wife Susan, eldest daughter of Edward Strong of Greenwich, born at Barnet in 1732. He was educated privately and at Clare Hall, Cambridge where he was admitted a fellow-commoner in 1751; he graduated M.A. in 1755. On his father's death he saw through the press the volume of Reports published in 1755. He was left very well off, and on leaving Cambridge travelled extensively in the south of France and Italy.

Developing a taste for science and archaeology, Strange was elected a Fellow of the Royal Society on 10 April, and admitted to the Royal Society on 24 April 1766. Shortly afterwards he was elected F.S.A., and as the result of a summer spent in South Wales in 1768, he contributed to the first number of the Archæologia "An Account of Roman Remains in and near the City of Brecknock". In 1771 he made an archaeological tour in the north of Italy. At Padua he formed the acquaintance of Alberto Fortis, who had recently returned from an exploration of Zara, Spalato, and other towns upon the Dalmatian coast. In November 1773 he was appointed British resident at Venice, where his official duties left leisure for the pursuit of his antiquarian studies. He resigned his diplomatic post in 1788, and settled at Ridge, near Barnet. But he paid several further visits to Italy in connection with the transportation of the collections that he had formed there, of books, manuscripts, antiquities, and pictures, chiefly by Bellini and other Venetian masters. On 4 July 1793 he was created an honorary D.C.L. at Oxford. He died at Ridge on 19 March 1799.

== Works ==
From information supplied by Alberto Fortis, Strange made communications to the Society of Antiquaries upon the Roman inscriptions and antiquities of Dalmatia and Istria, an area then little known in Western Europe. In addition to further communications to the Archæologia, Strange contributed a number of papers to the Philosophical Transactions, including "An Account of the Origin of Natural Paper found near Cortona in Tuscany" (vol. lix.). This was translated into Italian, and considerably expanded in "Lettera sopra l'origine della carta naturale di Cortona" (Pisa, 1764, and again, enlarged, 1765); "An Account of some Specimens of Sponges from Italy" (March 1770, lx. 177, with several plates from his drawings). This appeared in Italian as "Lettera del Signor Giovanni Strange, contenente la descrizione di alcune spugne" (ap. Olivi, Zoologica Adriatica, 1792, 4to); "An Account of a Curious Giant's Causeway newly discovered in the Euganean Hills, near Padua" (1775, lxv. 4, 418); an Italian version appeared at Milan, 1778, 4to; and "An Account of the Tides in the Adriatic" (vol. lxvii.). Several of his papers were also printed in the Opuscoli scelti sulle scienze (1778, &c.); and his geological papers appeared in Weber's Mineralogische Beschreibungen (Berne, 1792).

== Legacy ==
By his will, Strange directed all of his collections to be sold—the pictures by private contract; the prints, drawings, busts, coins, medals, bronzes, and antiquities by Christie's; the natural history cabinets by King, and the library by Leigh & Sotheby's. The sale of the library alone occupied 29 days in March and April 1801. A catalogue was compiled by Samuel Paterson (Dibdin, Bibliomania, p. 590).

== Family ==
About 1760 Strange married Sarah, daughter of Davidge Gould of Sharpham Park, Somerset, and sister of Sir Henry Gould the younger; she died at Venice in April 1783. They seem to have had no children.
