= John Dewar (MP) =

British Member of Parliament (died 1795)

John Dewar (c. 1746–1795) was a British politician who sat in the House of Commons from 1776 to 1780.

Dewar was the eldest son of George Dewar of Antigua and his wife Christina Panton daughter of John Panton of Basseterre, St. Kitts. His father returned from the West Indies, and purchased an estate at Doles, near Enham, Hampshire. Dewar married Caroline Vernon, daughter of James Vernon of Hilton Park, Staffordshire on 27 August 1766.

Dewar stood for Parliament at Cricklade at the 1774 general election but dropped out during the poll. A vacancy at Cricklade arose in December 1774, and he put himself forward again at the by-election. The process then dragged on for over a year, mainly due to the partiality of the returning officer. At the first by-election the returning officer closed the poll early and sent in a double return. The election was declared void by the House of Commons. At the second by-election in February 1775 the returning officer disqualified 108 of Dewar’s votes to the benefit of his opponent Samuel Peach. Peach was initially returned but there was a petition. Dewar was installed as Member of Parliament for Cricklade in his place on 20 February 1776.

According to his father, Dewar had got into serious financial difficulties “by a continued series of imprudences and extravagances” and probably for this reason he did not stand at the 1780 general election.

Dewar died four days after arriving at Bath on 9 February 1795. His son was at the time a prisoner of the French, having been captured on the Lisbon packet boat.

Parliament of Great Britain
Preceded by Samuel Peach; Arnold Nesbitt	Member of Parliament for Cricklade; 1776–1780; With: Arnold Nesbitt 1776-1779; John Macpherson 1779-1780	Succeeded by Paul Benfield; John Macpherson
