= John Strange (English politician) =

British politician and judge

The Right Honourable Sir John Strange

Master of the Rolls
- In office 11 January 1750 – 18 May 1754
- Nominated by: Lord Hardwicke
- Preceded by: Sir William Fortescue
- Succeeded by: Sir Thomas Clarke

Solicitor General for England and Wales
- In office 28 January 1737 – December 1742
- Nominated by: Lord Hardwicke
- Preceded by: Sir Dudley Ryder
- Succeeded by: Sir William Murray

Personal details
- Born: 1696
- Died: 18 May 1754 (aged 57–58)
- Children: 11, including John
- Profession: Barrister, judge, politician

Sir John Strange PC KC (1696 – 18 May 1754) was a British politician and judge.

== John Strange's life ==
He was born to another John Strange of Fleet Street, London and his second wife, Mary Plaistowe. He studied Law at the Middle Temple on 11 July 1712 before starting a pupillage at the chambers of Charles Salkeld, who trained (among others) Lord Hardwicke. He was called to the Bar on 27 October 1718.

In 1735 he bought the lease of Leyton Grange House in Leyton, then in Essex. In 1725 he represented Lord Macclesfield at his impeachment, and he was made a King's Counsel on 9 February 1736. The same year, he became a Bencher of Middle Temple.

He was appointed Solicitor General for England and Wales on 28 January 1737, and was made a Member of Parliament for West Looe to allow him to take his position. After the death of the Master of the Rolls Joseph Jekyll on 19 August 1738, Strange was invited to succeed him, but declined the offer. He became Recorder of London in November 1739, and on 12 May 1740 he was knighted, along with Dudley Ryder, the Attorney General for England and Wales. He resigned as Member of Parliament for West Looe in 1741, but was reelected for Totnes in a by-election in 1742.

In December 1742 he resigned as Recorder of London and Solicitor General, claiming ill-health, and also limited his practice as a barrister to the Court of King's Bench. In 1750 Lord Hardwicke convinced him to become Master of the Rolls, and he took his position on 11 January. On 17 March he was made a Privy Councillor. He served as master of the Rolls for four years until his death on 18 May 1754. After his death, his son John Strange, who had inherited (and sold) Grange House, published his father's court reports. Sir John Strange was buried at Leyton and commemorated by monuments in both the churchyard and the church of St Mary the Virgin. The inscriptions were published in 1796 and again in 1892, debunking persistent claims that Sir John's grave was marked by a ridiculous epitaph in the Rolls Chapel:

Here lies an honest lawyer,
and that is Strange.

== Family ==
On 14 May 1722 he married Susannah Strong, eldest daughter of Edward Strong the Younger sculptor and mason of St Paul's Cathedral. They had two sons and nine daughters. This included John Strange.

== Bibliography ==
- Foss, Edward (1870). A Biographical Dictionary of the Justices of England (1066 - 1870). Spottiswoode and Company.
- White, William (1892). Notes and queries. Oxford University Press.

Parliament of Great Britain
Preceded by John Owen; John Willes	Member of Parliament for West Looe; 1737–1741; With: John Owen	Succeeded by Charles Wager; Benjamin Keene
Preceded by Charles Wills; Sir Joseph Danvers	Member of Parliament for Totnes; 1742–1754; With: Sir Joseph Danvers 1742–1747; Charles Taylor 1747–1754; Browse Trist 1754	Succeeded by Browse Trist; Richard Lloyd
Legal offices
Preceded by Sir Dudley Ryder	Solicitor General for England and Wales; 28 January 1737 – December 1742	Succeeded by Sir William Murray
Preceded by Sir William Fortescue	Master of the Rolls; 11 January 1750 – 18 May 1754	Succeeded by Sir Thomas Clarke
