= William Earle (MP) =

William Earle (1728–1774) was a British office holder and politician who sat in the House of Commons briefly in 1774.

== Life ==
Earle was the third son of Rev. Thomas Earle, vicar of Malmesbury and his second wife Grace, and was baptized on 24 April 1728. He married his first wife Katherine in about 1749. Earle was deputy steward of Malmesbury under Henry Fox from September 1750 to September 1762 and under him received a number of official posts, mainly for life. In 1752 he was appointed Inspector of baggage in the port of London, in 1755 Commissary of Musters in South Britain and in April 1761 Steward of Chelsea Hospital. He was appointed receiver of land tax for North Wiltshire in 1761, dismissed in May 1765 and restored in November 1765. He married secondly Anne Estcourt, daughter of Edmund Estcourt of Burton Hill, Malmesbury on 18 December 1766. Anne was heiress of Grange Farm, Malmesbury which came to Earle.

Earle was frustrated in his wish to stand at Malmesbury but eventually at the 1774 general election was nominated for Cricklade. He was too ill to appear in person, but his wife canvassed on his behalf. He was returned as Member of Parliament for Cricklade, topping the poll, but died six weeks later without having taken his seat in Parliament.

Earle died on 25 November 1774

Parliament of Great Britain
Preceded by Hon. George Damer; Lieutenant-Colonel Sir Robert Fletcher	Member of Parliament for Cricklade; 1774–1774; With: Arnold Nesbitt	Succeeded by Samuel Peach; Arnold Nesbitt
