= John Mordaunt (MP) =

English soldier and politician

The Honourable John Mordaunt

Personal details
- Born: c. 1709
- Died: 1 July 1767 (aged 57–58)
- Spouse(s): Mary Howe (m. 1735; died 1749) Elizabeth Hamilton
- Parent: John Mordaunt (father)
- Relatives: Charles Mordaunt (brother)
- Military career
- Rank: Lieutenant Colonel
- Unit: Royal Horse Guards
- Commands: Duke of Kingston's Regiment of Light Horse

The Honourable John Mordaunt (c. 1709 – 1 July 1767) was a British Army officer and politician.

== Biography ==
Mordaunt was the second son of John Mordaunt, Viscount Mordaunt and Frances Powlett and educated at Westminster School. He joined the Army as a cornet in the Royal Horse Guards from 1726 to 1736. In 1745, during the Jacobite Rebellion, he rejoined the Army to serve as the lieutenant colonel of the Duke of Kingston's Regiment of Light Horse, which he commanded at the Battle of Culloden.

He was elected to Parliament in 1739 as the member for Nottinghamshire, sitting until 1747, and was then elected to represent Winchelsea until 1754. He lastly sat for Christchurch from 1754 to 1761.

He died in 1767. He had married in November 1735 the Hon. Mary Howe (d. 1749), the daughter of Scrope Howe, 1st Viscount Howe and the widow of Thomas Herbert, 8th Earl of Pembroke. He secondly married Elizabeth Hamilton, but left no children by either wife.

Parliament of Great Britain
Preceded by Thomas Bennet; William Levinz	Member of Parliament for Nottinghamshire; 1739–1747; With: William Levinz	Succeeded by Lord Robert Manners-Sutton; John Thornhagh
Preceded by The Viscount Doneraile; Thomas Orby Hunter	Member of Parliament for Winchelsea; 1747–1754; With: Thomas Orby Hunter	Succeeded by Thomas Orby Hunter; Arnold Nesbitt
Preceded by Sir Thomas Robinson; Harry Powlett	Member of Parliament for Christchurch; 1754–1761; With: Sir Thomas Robinson	Succeeded by Thomas Robinson; James Harris
