= Humphrey Cornewall =

English landowner and Member of Parliament

Sir Humphrey Cornewall KB, JP
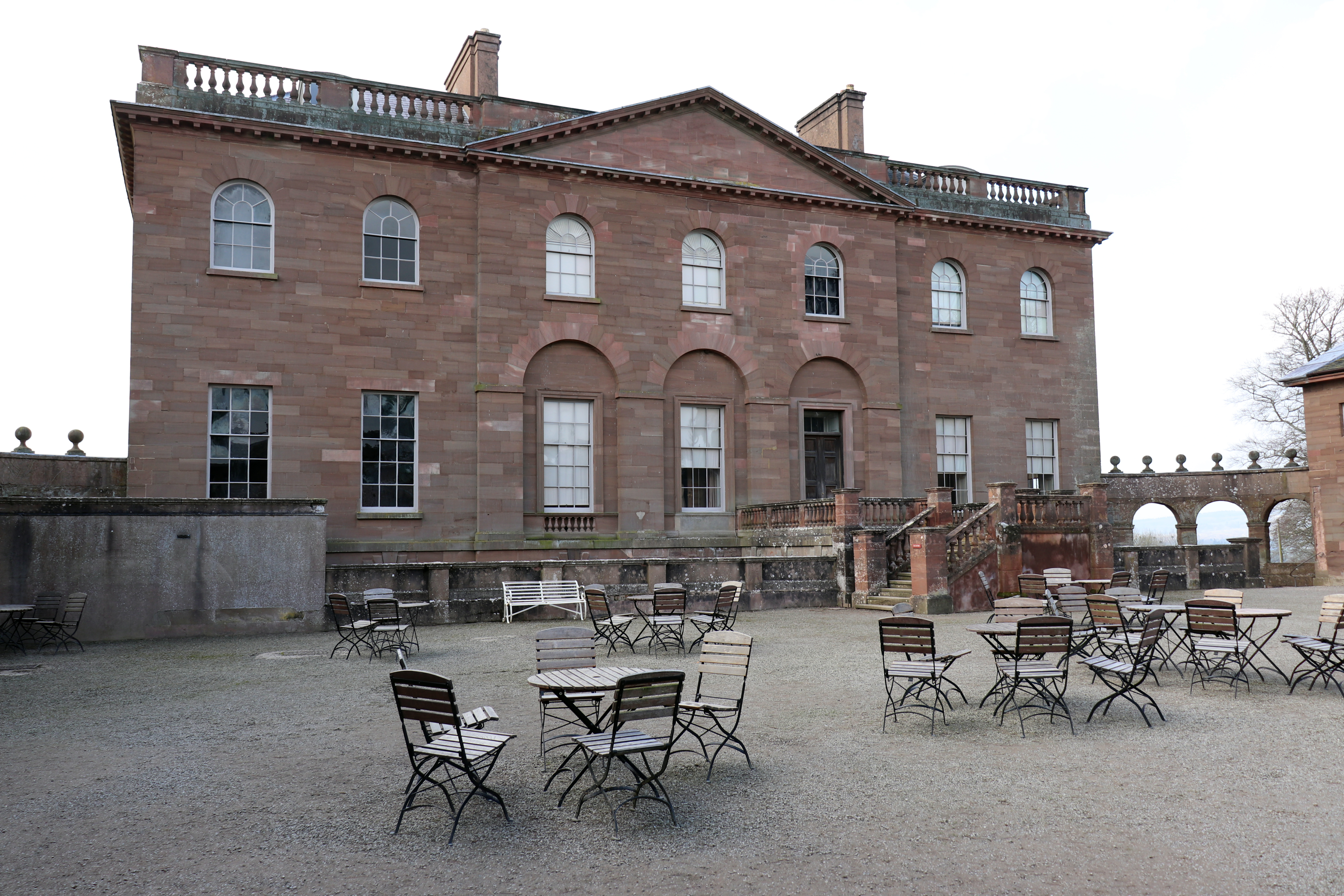
- Berrington Hall; owned by the Cornwall family since 1386, rebuilt in 1778

Mayor of Ludlow
- In office 1686–1687

Deputy lieutenant of Herefordshire
- In office 1662–1688

Member of Parliament for Leominster
- In office May 1661 – January 1679

Personal details
- Born: 14 July 1616 (baptised) Berrington Hall, Herefordshire
- Died: 7 July 1688 (aged 71) Barnaby House, Ludlow
- Spouse: Theophilia Skinner
- Children: 5 sons, 4 daughters, including Robert (1647–1705), and Wolfran (1658–1720)

Military service
- Allegiance: Royalist
- Rank: Captain
- Battles/wars: First English Civil War; Attack on Stokesay Castle; Siege of Ludlow Castle

Sir Humphrey Cornewall, baptised 16 July 1616, buried 7 July 1688, was an English landowner from Herefordshire and Member of Parliament for Leominster from 1661 to 1679. He served in the Royalist army during the First English Civil War, although he later claimed to have done so under compulsion. After the Stuart Restoration, he was appointed Deputy lieutenant of Herefordshire in 1662, and became Mayor of Ludlow in 1686.

== Personal details ==
He was born in 1616, the eldest son of John Cornewall and Mary Barneby, and was baptised at Eye, Herefordshire on 14 July 1616.

== Career ==
During the First English Civil War, he served on the Royalist side under Sir Henry Lingen, though he later claimed to have done so only to defend himself and his neighbours from the depredations of cavalier soldiers. Edward Harley attested that Cornewall was forced to participate in an assault on Stokesay Castle and to sit on a royalist grand jury. For this support of the cause of King Charles, he was fined £222 (equivalent to £36,141 in 2025) by the victorious Parliamentarians on 1 July 1647. Successfully pleading poverty, he only actually paid £21 16s of this amount. He was also suspected of complicity with George Booth's rising in 1659.

The Restoration brought about a marked improvement in Cornewall's fortunes. His name was put forward as a potential Knight of the Royal Oak. He served as a Justice of the peace in Herefordshire from 1660 until his death, and commissioner for assessment in that county from 1660 to 1680. He was elected to represent Leominster in the Cavalier Parliament of 1661. He was a major in the Herefordshire Militia by 1662, in which year he also became Deputy Lieutenant of Herefordshire and a commissioner for loyal and indigent officers. In 1670 he became a member of the Council in the Marches of Wales. He was made a captain in the Admiralty Regiment in 1672, and a commissioner for recusants in 1675. After leaving parliament in 1679, he concentrated his attention on Ludlow, where he had been a freeman since 1676. He was an Alderman from 1685 onwards, and was Mayor from 1686 to 1687.

== Private life ==
He married Theophila Skynner (1622–1718), eldest daughter of William Skynner of Thornton Abbey. The couple had nine children:

- Theophila Cornewall (1644–1731), married on 24 September 1673 Edward Agborough of Ludlow
- Robert Cornewall (1647–1705), soldier and courtier
- Cyriac Cornewall (1652–1718), captain in his cousin Henry Cornewall's Regiment of Foot
- Humphrey Cornewall
- Edward Cornewall, also a captain in Cornewall's Foot
- Wolfran Cornewall (1658–1720), captain in the Royal Navy. His great grandson was Charles Wolfran Cornwall.
- Bridget Cornewall
- A daughter Winifrid, who married a Mr Richard Whitney
- Caroline Cornewall, married a Mr Roborow

Humphrey Cornwall died and was buried at Ludlow on 7 July 1688.

Parliament of England
Preceded by John Birch; Edward Pytts	Member of Parliament for Leominster; 1661–1679; With: Ranald Grahme	Succeeded by James Pytts; John Dutton Colt
