= English ship Gainsborough (1653) =

Ship of the line of the Royal Navy

History

England
- Name: Gainsborough
- Builder: Thomas Taylor, Pitchouse
- Launched: 1653
- Renamed: Swallow, 1660
- Fate: Wrecked, 1692

General characteristics
- Class & type: Fourth-rate frigate
- Tons burthen: 543 bm
- Length: 100 ft 10 in (30.7 m) (keel)
- Beam: 31 ft 10 in (9.7 m)
- Depth of hold: 12 ft 9 in (3.9 m)
- Sail plan: Full-rigged ship
- Complement: 150 initially, later 180, finally 230 in wartime.
- Armament: 40 guns (1660); 48 guns (1666 and 1677), comprising 22 culverins, 20 demi-culverins and 6 sakers

Gainsborough was a 40-gun fourth-rate frigate of the English Navy, originally built under the 1652 programme for the navy of the Commonwealth of England by Thomas Taylor at Pitch House (Wapping), and launched in 1653. She was named for the Parliamentarian victory at the Battle of Gainsborough in 1643.

After the Restoration of the monarchy in 1660, she was renamed Swallow. By 1666 her armament had been increased to 48 guns.

The Swallow, commanded by Captain Wolfran Cornewall, served as Colonel Cunningham's flagship during the expedition to Loch Foyle in April 1689. The fleet carried two battalions which should have reinforced the garrison of Derry. The town, which was loyal to King William, had already been attacked in December 1688, and was about to be attacked again as James was on his way to the town with a strong army. However Robert Lundy, the city's governor, told Cunningham to return to England as the town would surrender.

The Swallow, still under the command of Wolfbran Cornewall, was also part of the relief fleet for Derry under General Percy Kirke in June and July 1689.

Swallow was wrecked at Kinsale on 9 February 1692.
