= Thomas Sewell (judge) =

British judge and politician

The Right Honourable Sir Thomas Sewell

Master of the Rolls
- In office 4 December 1764 – 6 March 1784
- Monarch: George III
- Preceded by: Sir Thomas Clarke
- Succeeded by: Sir Lloyd Kenyon

Personal details
- Born: c. 1710 Essex
- Died: 6 March 1784
- Spouse(s): Catherine Heath, Mary Elizabeth Sibthorp
- Children: Eight, including Thomas, Frances
- Profession: Barrister

Sir Thomas Sewell PC (c. 1710 – 6 March 1784) was an English judge and Member of Parliament, and Master of the Rolls from 1764 to 1784.

He was the son of Thomas Sewell of West Ham, Essex. He is said to have been "bred up under an attorney". Sewell was a member of Middle Temple, called to the bar in 1734, and practised in the Chancery courts, where he was highly successful. He became a bencher of his inn and King's Counsel in 1754, and Treasurer of the Inn in 1765. By 1764, he was thought to be making between £3000 and £4000 a year from his practice, and was popular among religious dissenters as their champion in the courts.

== Political career ==
He stood for Parliament in 1754 at Wallingford and was defeated, despite spending more than £2000 (some from the Prime Minister's election fund) in the attempt, but was elected in 1758 as member for Harwich. Harwich was a "Treasury borough", where the government candidate was certain of success, but Sewell had his own interest in the town as well, since his father-in-law, Thomas Heath had been its MP earlier in the century.

However, he made little impact in the Commons and at the next election was not re-nominated at Harwich. He stood instead at Exeter, where he was heavily defeated despite Prime Minister Newcastle's support, though this time at his own expense rather than the government's. Nevertheless, later in the year, he was returned instead as the government candidate at Winchelsea.

In 1761, Sewell was one of two candidates considered for appointment as Solicitor General, but the post went instead to Fletcher Norton. However, in 1764 he was knighted and appointed Master of the Rolls, apparently to the surprise of many including himself, after a number of other candidates had refused the post; he held it until his death twenty years later. He earned a reputation as an able and efficient judge. He was also made a member of the Privy Council.

== Family ==
He married firstly Catherine Heath, daughter of Thomas Heath, MP for Harwich, by whom he had eight children, including Thomas Bailey Heath Sewell, his eldest son and heir, and Frances, who married Matthew Lewis, the Deputy Secretary at War by whom she was the mother of the writer Matthew Lewis. She and her husband were later separated. He married secondly Mary Elizabeth Sibthorpe, daughter of Humphry Sibthorp, professor of botany at Oxford University and his first wife Sarah Waldo, by whom he had no surviving issue.

Thomas Bailey Heath Sewell married Lady Elizabeth Bermingham, eldest daughter and co-heiress of Thomas Bermingham, 1st Earl of Louth. Their son, also Thomas, made out a claim to the older Bermingham title Baron Athenry, but failed to establish his right, the House of Lords ruling, as they also did in another case, that the title could not descend in the female line.

Parliament of Great Britain
Preceded by Wenman Coke; Viscount Duncannon	Member of Parliament for Harwich; 1758–1761; With: Wenman Coke	Succeeded by Charles Townshend; John Roberts
Preceded by Thomas Orby Hunter; The Earl of Thomond	Member of Parliament for Winchelsea; 1761–1768; With: Thomas Orby Hunter	Succeeded by Thomas Orby Hunter; The Earl of Thomond
Legal offices
Preceded by Sir Thomas Clarke	Master of the Rolls; 1764–1784	Succeeded by Sir Lloyd Kenyon
