= Thomas Clarke (judge) =

British judge

The Right Honourable Sir Thomas Clarke FRS
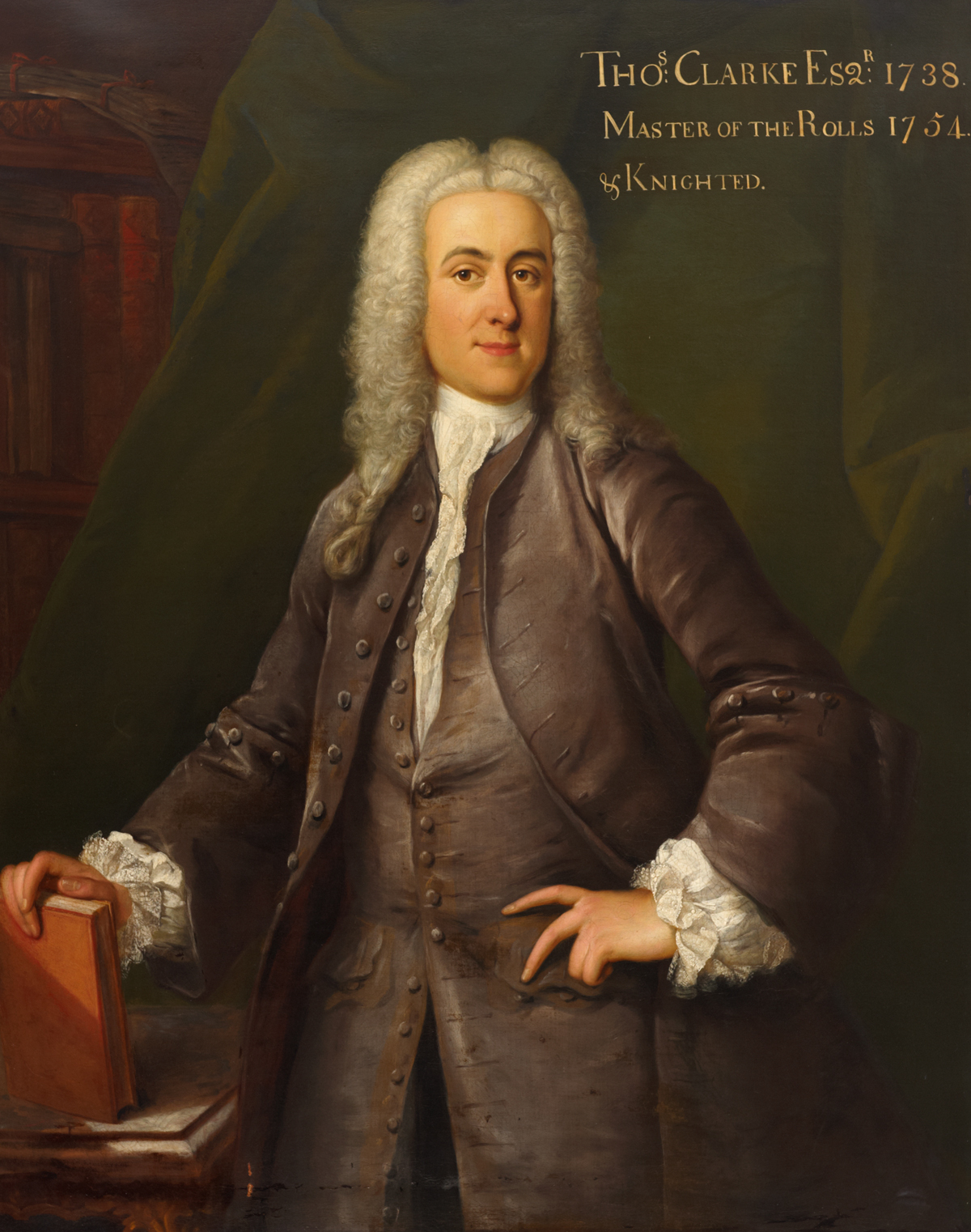

Master of the Rolls
- In office 25 May 1754 – 13 November 1764
- Preceded by: Sir John Strange
- Succeeded by: Sir Thomas Sewell

Personal details
- Born: 1703
- Died: 13 November 1764 (aged 60–61)
- Education: Trinity College, Cambridge
- Profession: Barrister, judge

Sir Thomas Clarke PC FRS (1703 – 13 November 1764) was a British judge who served as Master of the Rolls. He was the son of a carpenter and a pawnbroker from St Giles in the Fields, and was educated at Westminster School between 1715 and 1721 thanks to the help of Zachary Pearce. On 10 June 1721 he matriculated to Trinity College, Cambridge, graduating with a BA in 1724. He became a fellow of Trinity College in 1727, and a member of Gray's Inn the same year. Clarke was evidently knowledgeable in Roman law, and was mentioned in a poem called the causidicade as a possible Solicitor General in 1742. He became a King's Counsel (KC) in 1740, and in 1742 left Gray's Inn to join Lincoln's Inn, which he became a bencher of in 1754.

In 1747 he was elected a Member of Parliament for St Michael's, and in 1754 was returned for Lostwithiel. After the death of the Master of the Rolls, Sir John Strange, Clarke was offered the position. The job was originally offered to William Murray, later Lord Mansfield, but he turned it down. If he had accepted, Clarke might instead have succeeded Murray as Attorney General for England and Wales. Clarke was officially appointed on 25 May 1754, and was knighted at the same time. In June 1754 he was invested as a Privy Councillor (PC). Clarke evidently discharged his duties "with great credit" for ten years, until his death in office on 13 November 1764. He was buried in the Rolls Chapel, now the main library of King's College London.

Clarke was a close friend of the second Earl of Macclesfield, and this friendship combined with his unclear parentage started rumours that Clark was in fact Macclesfield's son. "He left a large fortune behind him, which he had acquired solely by the practice of his profession, the greater part of it being bequeathed by him to the third earl of Macclesfield, the grandson of his old benefactor." In his will, Clarke left his Flitcroft-designed home, Branch Hill Lodge, to Macclesfield. Outside politics and law, Clarke was a Fellow of the Royal Society (FRS), and "devoted himself to philosophical pursuits".

== Bibliography ==
- Foss, Edward (1870). A Biographical Dictionary of the Justices of England (1066–1870). Spottiswoode and Company.
- Colvin, Howard (2008). A biographical dictionary of British architects, 1600–1840 (4th ed.). Yale University Press. ISBN 978-0-300-12508-5.

Parliament of Great Britain
Preceded by Edward Pickering; Richard Lloyd	Member of Parliament for Mitchell; 1747–1754; With: Albert Nesbitt 1747–53; Arnold Nesbitt 1753–54	Succeeded by John Stephenson; Robert Clive
Preceded by Richard Edgcumbe	Member of Parliament for Lostwithiel; 1754–61; With: James Edward Colleton	Succeeded by James Edward Colleton; George Howard
Legal offices
Preceded by Sir John Strange	Master of the Rolls; 25 May 1754 – 13 November 1764	Succeeded by Sir Thomas Sewell
