= James MacLean (priest) =

Canadian Anglican priest

James Aubrey MacLean was a Canadian Anglican priest, most notably Archdeacon of St Andrews in the Diocese of Montreal from 1975 to 1982.

MacLean was educated at the Montreal Diocesan Theological College and ordained in 1954. After a curacy at St Peter, Montreal he held incumbencies at St Ignatius, Montreal and Ste. Anne de Bellevue.

He died in May 1992.
