= Robert Cornewall =

English soldier and courtier

Robert Cornewall (1647–1705) of Berrington Hall, Herefordshire, was an English soldier and courtier.

== Life ==
He was born in 1647, the eldest son of Humphrey Cornewall and Theophila Skynner, and was baptised at Eye, Herefordshire, on 17 June 1647.

He joined the army, becoming an ensign in Lord Worcester's regiment on 13 June 1667, and a captain in Sir John Talbot's Dragoons on 22 February 1678. He was made captain of an independent troop on 18 June 1685, Captain lieutenant in the Queen Dowager's Horse on 31 July 1685, and captain in 1687.

He was elected to represent Leominster in the general election of 1685, a post that his father had occupied previously. He was also a magistrate in Herefordshire between 1675 and 1689; Commissioner for Assessment from 1677 to 1680 and in 1689; a freeman of Ludlow in 1681 and captain of the Herefordshire Militia from 1683 to 1689. He was gentleman waiter to Prince George of Denmark from 1683 to 1689.

Identified as a Jacobite after the Glorious Revolution, he lost his commission and his court appointments. An attempt to return to public life on the accession of Queen Anne was unsuccessful.

Robert Cornewall died suddenly and was buried at Eye on 9 November 1705.

== Family ==
Cornewall married Edith Cornewallis, daughter of Sir Francis Cornewallis of Abermarlais, Carmarthenshire, in July 1668. The couple had eleven children:

- Charles Cornewall (1669–1718), Vice admiral in the Royal Navy
- Frances Cornewall (b. 1670)
- Edward Cornewall (b. 1671)
- Robert Cornewall (b. 1673)
- Elizabeth Cornewall (b. 1675)
- Robert Cornewall (b. 1676)
- Rev. Frederick Cornewall (1677–1748), Vicar of Bromfield; father of Captain Frederick Cornewall RN
- Henry Cornewall (b. 1679)
- James Cornewall (1685–86)
- George Cornewall
- Henrietta Cornewall, married William Proby and was mother of John Proby

Parliament of England
Preceded by Thomas Coningsby; John Dutton Colt	Member of Parliament for Leominster; 1685–1689; With: Thomas Coningsby	Succeeded by Thomas Coningsby; John Dutton Colt
