= James E. McLean =

American academic administrator and educational researcher

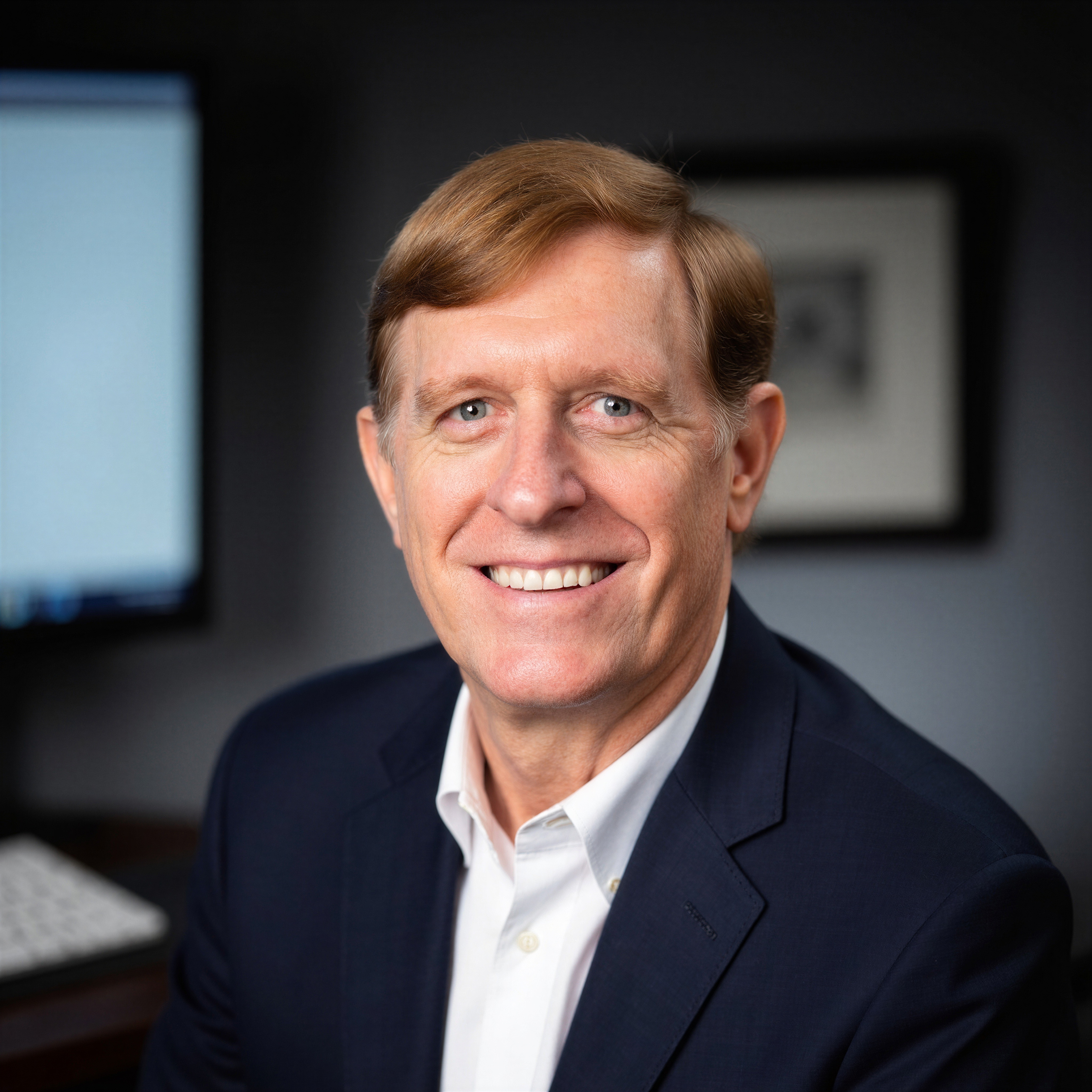
- Occupations: Academic administrator, educational researcher
- Known for: Dean of the University of Alabama College of Education

James E. McLean is an American academic administrator and educational researcher. He served as dean of the College of Education at the University of Alabama from 2004 until his retirement in 2013, and holds the titles of Dean Emeritus and University Research Professor Emeritus at the university.

== Early life and education ==
McLean earned a bachelor's degree in secondary mathematics education, a master's degree in statistics, and a doctorate in research foundations of education, with a minor in statistics, all from the University of Florida.

== Academic career ==
McLean joined the faculty of the University of Alabama in 1974 and spent 21 years there, advancing from assistant professor to full professor before the University of Alabama System Board of Trustees named him a University Research Professor in 1987.

In 1995 McLean moved to the University of Alabama at Birmingham, where he held the University Research Professor rank and served as founding director of the university's Center for Educational Accountability. He has since been designated professor emeritus at UAB.

From 2000 to 2004 he held the James H. Quillen Chair of Excellence in Education at East Tennessee State University.

In 2004 the University of Alabama named McLean dean of its College of Education, a post he held until his retirement in 2013. After retiring as dean, he continued to serve part-time as associate vice president for community affairs and executive director of the university's Center for Community-Based Partnerships. He retired from his role in the Division of Community Affairs in June 2026. The division's vice president, Samory Pruitt, retired effective June 1, 2026, and the division was later succeeded by the Division of Partnerships, led by Vice President LeNá Powe McDonald.

McLean has served as president of the Mid-South Educational Research Association (MSERA). In 1995 he wrote Improving Education Through Action Research: A Guide for Administrators and Teachers, and in 1996 he co-authored the book Why We Assess Students -- And How: The Competing Measures of Student Performance with Robert E. Lockwood.

== Publications ==
- McLean, James E. (1995). Improving Education Through Action Research: A Guide for Administrators and Teachers. Corwin Press. ISBN 978-0803961869.
- McLean, James E.; Lockwood, Robert E. (1996). Why We Assess Students -- And How: The Competing Measures of Student Performance. Corwin Press. ISBN 978-0803963351.
