= Arnold Nesbitt (MP) =

Arnold Nesbitt (c. 1721–1779), was a British merchant and politician who sat in the House of Commons between 1753 and 1779.

Nesbitt was the son of Thomas Nesbitt of Lismore, County Cavan and his wife Jane. He was apprenticed to his uncle Albert Nesbitt, a London merchant, and became his partner and heir. His uncle died on 12 January 1753 and Nesbit inherited his business, his estate at Icklesham and his political connections with the Pelham family.

Lord Sandwich allowed Nesbitt to take over his uncle's seat as Member of Parliament for Mitchell at a by-election in 1753 and was prepared to support him again in 1754 but Henry and James Pelham insisted upon his standing then at Winchelsea. He married Susanna Thrale, daughter of Ralph Thrale MP on 28 November 1758. At this time he had several government contracts and worked in close partnership with James and George Colebrooke. These contracts included ones for money remittances to America in 1756, and for victualling troops at Louisburg and St. John's in North America & Guadeloupe and Quebec between 1758 and 1760. He had interest in a Dublin bank with George Colebrooke, and he was underwriting Government loans on a large scale.

Nesbitt was asked to stand down at Winchelsea in the 1761 general election and instead was returned at Cricklade. Although he had purchased the borough and hundred of Cricklade in 1764, he was defeated there at the general election of 1768, and only re-entered Parliament for Winchelsea in a by-election in January 1770. He was by then in partnership with Adam Drummond holding contracts for victualling troops in North America and Canada. After the outbreak of the American War, the size of the contracts was doubled and he received a grant of 20,000 acres in St John's Island. In the 1774 general election Nesbitt was returned as MP for Winchelsea unopposed, and as MP for Cricklade after a contest. He chose to sit for Cricklade until his death in 1779. He is not recorded as having spoken in all his time in Parliament.

Nesbitt died aged 57 on 7 April 1779 and left most of his estate to his nephew John Nesbitt, after providing for two illegitimate sons Colebrooke Nesbitt and Arnold Nesbitt.

== Sources ==
Parliament of Great Britain
Preceded by Thomas Clarke; Albert Nesbitt	Member of Parliament for Mitchell; 1753 – 1754; With: Thomas Clarke	Succeeded by John Stephenson; Robert Clive
Preceded by Lieutenant Colonel John Mordaunt; The Earl of Thomond	Member of Parliament for Winchelsea; 1754 –1761; With: The Earl of Thomond; Lieutenant Colonel George Gray; Thomas Orby Hunter	Succeeded by The Earl of Thomond; Thomas Orby Hunter
Preceded by William Rawlinson Earle; Thomas Gore	Member of Parliament for Cricklade; 1761 –1768; With: Thomas Gore	Succeeded by Hon. George Damer; Lieutenant-Colonel Sir Robert Fletcher
Preceded by The Earl of Thomond; Thomas Orby Hunter	Member of Parliament for Winchelsea; 1770–1775; With: The Earl of Thomond; William Nedham; Charles Wolfran Cornwall	Succeeded by Charles Wolfran Cornwall; William Nedham
Preceded by Hon. George Damer; Lieutenant-Colonel Sir Robert Fletcher	Member of Parliament for Cricklade; 1774–1779; With: William Earle; Samuel Peach; John Dewar	Succeeded by John Dewar; John Macpherson
