= Fryston Hall =

Former country house near Castleford, West Yorkshire, England

Coordinates: 53.732°N 1.289°W

Fryston Hall was a country house at Water Fryston, West Yorkshire which stood in an estate between the town of Castleford and the River Aire near where the river is crossed by the A1(M). The main building was demolished in 1934 and only some outbuildings survive as farm buildings.

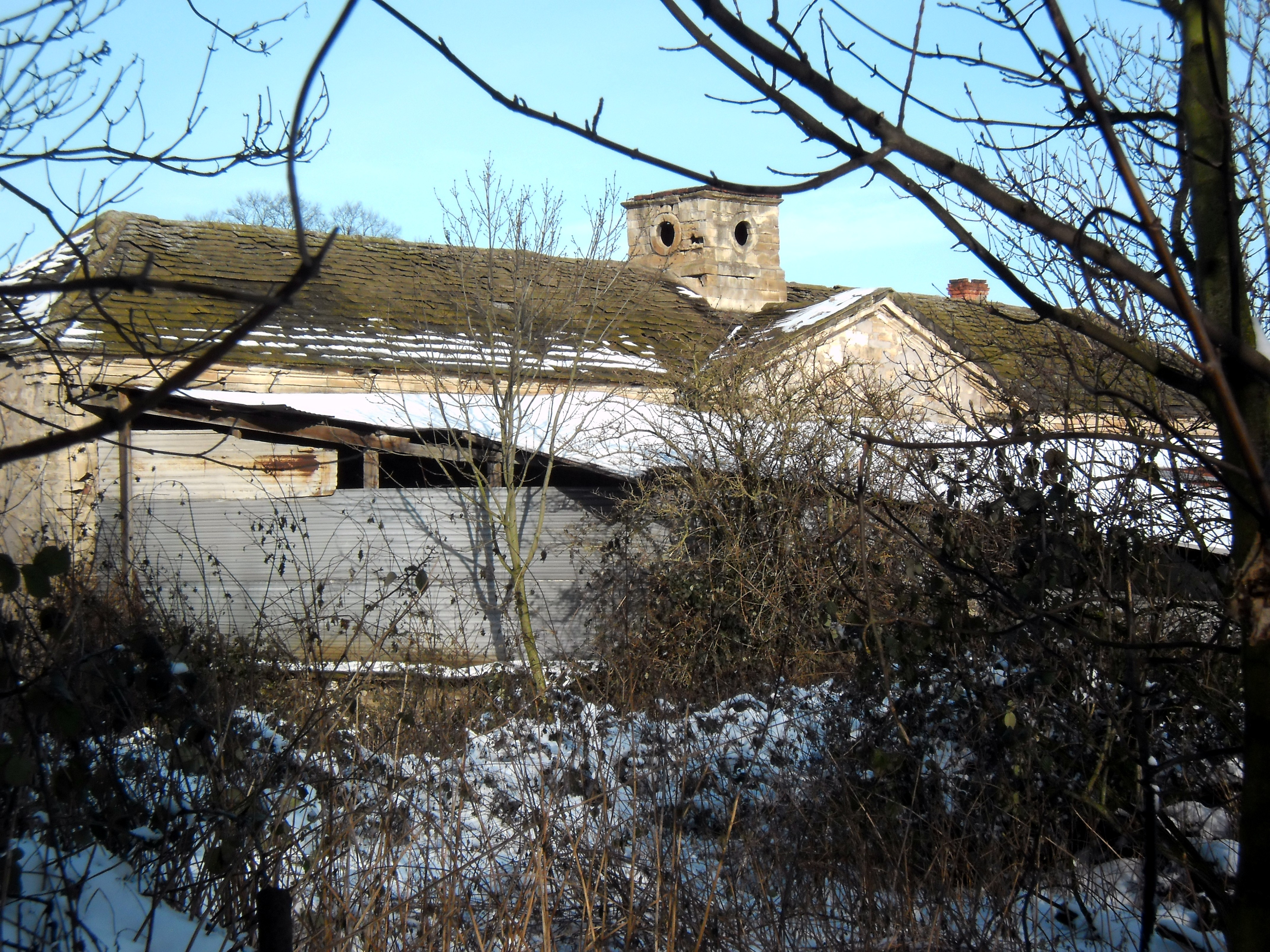
Fryston Hall stables

The hall itself stood in 200 acres of parkland. Buried in one of the lawns is a stone coffin containing what were thought to be the remains of Thomas, 2nd Earl of Lancaster, who was beheaded in 1322 on the orders of King Edward II. The coffin was excavated in March 1882 from a nearby field and re-interred at Fryston Hall at the request of the then owner.

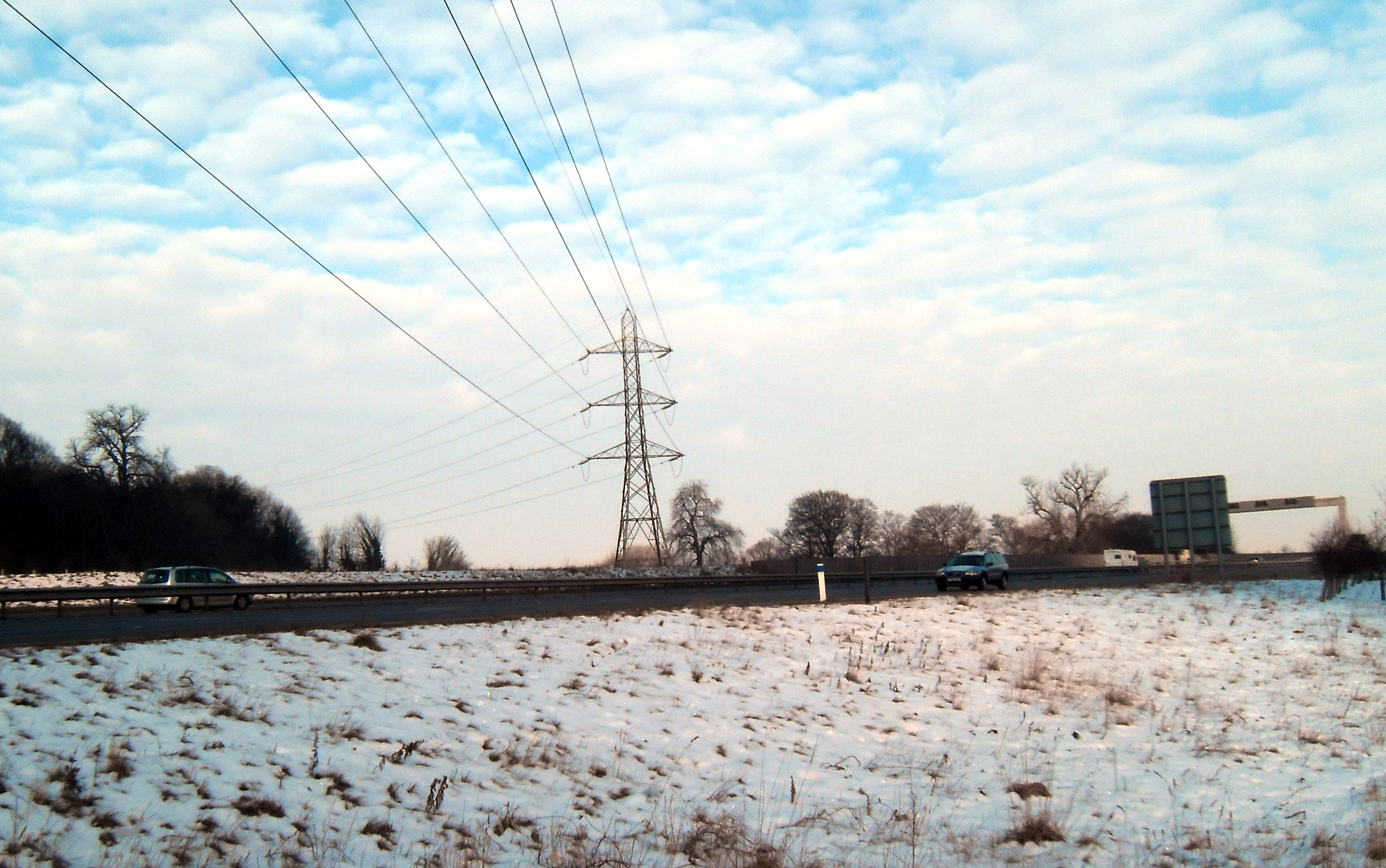
Site of Fryston Hall (2012)

Fryston Hall was once occupied by George Crowle (1696–1754), MP for Hull and his brother Richard Crowle (1699–1757), also MP for Hull. The Crowle family developed coal mining on the estate but in 1788 the estate was sold to Richard Slater Milnes (1759–1804), the heir to a cloth fortune and MP for York, who improved the house and planted many trees. The estate passed down in the Milnes family from Richard to his son Robert Pemberton Milnes (1784-1858), MP for Pontefract. From him it descended to Richard Monckton Milnes, 1st Baron Houghton (1809-1885), the poet, writer and unsuccessful suitor of Florence Nightingale, and also an MP for Pontefract. His well-known library at the hall was devastated by fire in 1876. Richard's son, Robert (1858-1945), became a Liberal politician and was created Earl of Crewe in 1895 and Marquess of Crewe in 1911. Robert lived for a while at Fryston Hall before selling it by auction in 1905. The partially derelict hall was then demolished in 1934 and some of the stone used to build the Holy Cross Church at Airedale.
