= John Nesbitt (MP) =

English politician

John Nesbitt (1745 – 15 March 1817) was a British politician and the Member of Parliament for Bodmin from 1796 to 1802.

== See also ==
- List of MPs in the first United Kingdom Parliament
