= James Noël MacKenzie MacLean =

Scottish historian

James Noël Mackenzie Maclean (1928–1978) was a Scottish historian.

== Biography ==
He was born on Christmas Day in 1928, the eldest son of Elsie May Maclean (nee Davis) and James Walter Maclean. He attended the Stationers' Company's School and then Lincoln College, Oxford where he obtained a B.Litt. degree. He then studied for a PhD at the University of Edinburgh, which he gained in 1967. He served in the RAF from 1947 to 1950. He was a founder member of the Clan Maclean London Branch and served as the Secretary from 1953 to 1955. He died on 20 January 1978.

== Publications ==
- Clan Gillean (the Macleans) (1954)
- Memoirs of a Barra boy (1959)
- Reward is secondary: the life of a political adventurer and an inquiry (1963)
- The Macleans of Sweden (1971)
- The royal visit of 1822 (1972) with Basil C. Skinner
- French-Canadian emigrants to New England (1973)
