= Richard Slater Milnes =

English politician (1759–1804)

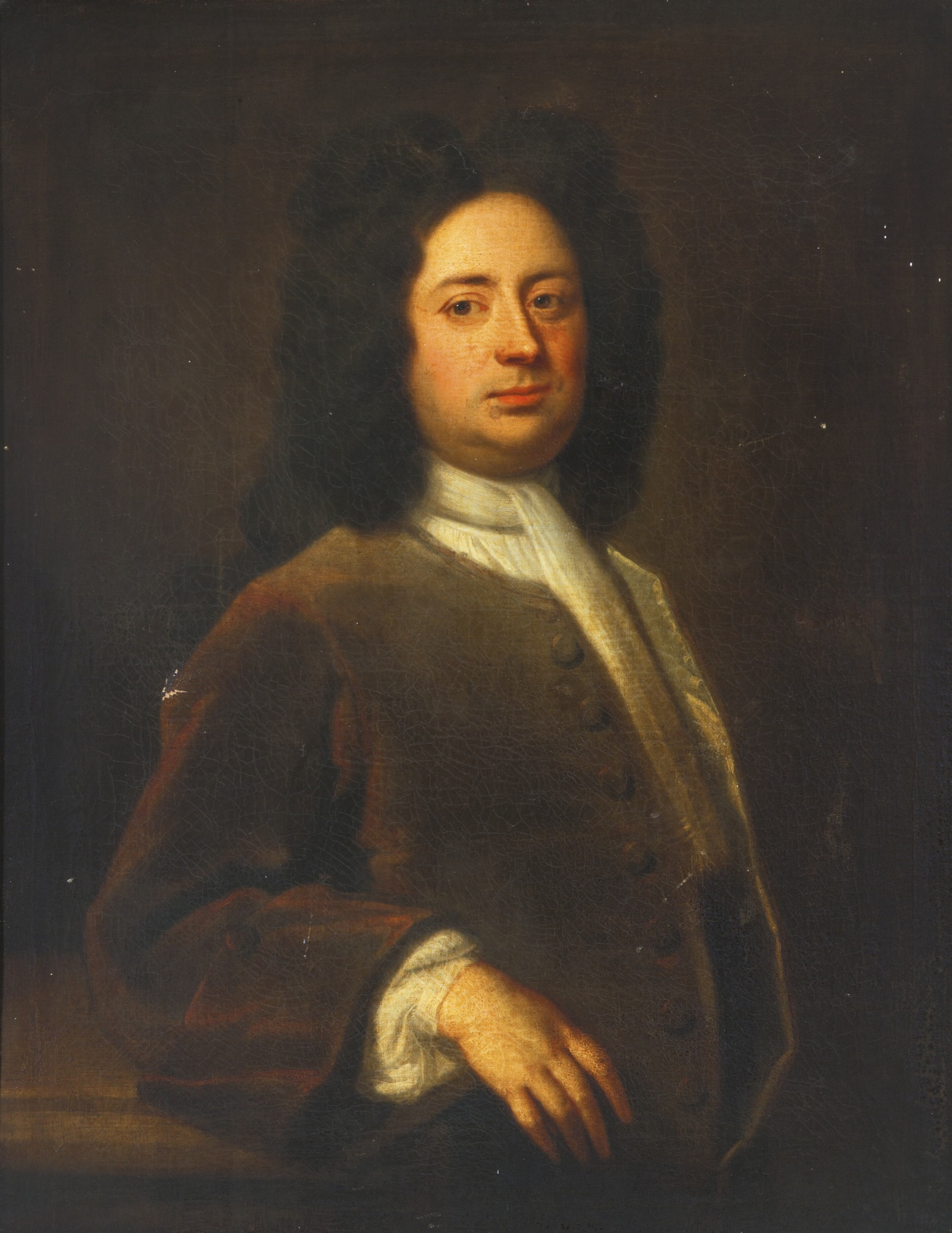
- Portrait of Mr Richard Slater Milnes (circle of Michael Dahl)
- Born: December 1759
- Died: 2 June 1804 (aged 44)
- Education: University of Glasgow
- Occupation: Politician
- Spouse: Rachel Busk
- Children: 9, including Robert
- Parent(s): Robert Milnes; Joyce Slater

Richard Slater Milnes (December 1759 – 2 June 1804) was an English heir, landowner and politician. The heir to a cloth fortune, he served in the British Parliament, where he championed the abolitionist cause.

== Early life ==
Richard Slater Milnes was born in December 1759 to Robert Milnes, a Presbyterian cloth merchant, who he succeeded in 1771. His mother, Joyce, was the daughter of Adam Slater. Milnes graduated from the University of Glasgow in Scotland in 1775.

== Career ==
Milnes was a country gentleman at his Fryston Hall estate in Yorkshire. He served as a Member of Parliament for the City of York in the House of Commons of Great Britain from 1784 to 1790, and again from 1790 to 1802. During his tenure, he gave a speech in favour of the abolition of the slave trade and was a supporter of William Pitt the Younger. At the election of 1796, Sir William Milner and Milnes, united in their opposition to the war with Revolutionary France, were returned unopposed, though it was thought that, had a third man offered, Milnes would have been defeated. Milnes retired for health reasons in 1802.

== Personal life ==
Milnes married Rachel, the daughter of Hans Busk, and had 2 sons and 7 daughters. They resided at Fryston Hall.

== Death ==
Milnes died on 2 June 1804. He was succeeded by his eldest son Robert Pemberton Milnes who also became an MP, representing Pontefract.
