= William Sotheron =

British politician and military officer

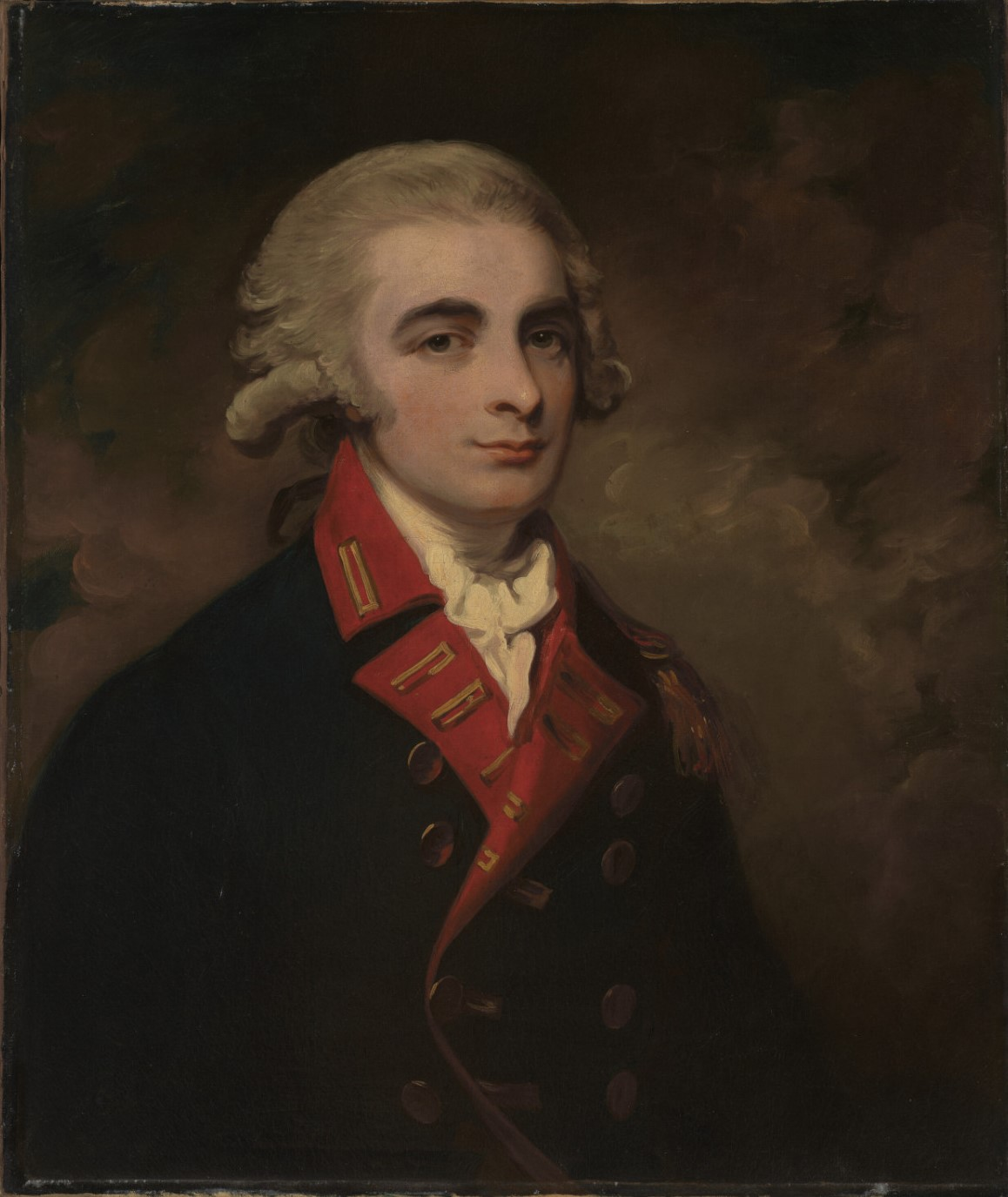
William Sotheron, painting by George Romney, 1788.

William Sotherton (c. 1755 - 31 January 1806) was an English politician who served as Member of Parliament for Pontefract from 1784 to 1796.

== Career ==
Sotherton spent most of his career in the military serving from 1770 to 1797 rising to the rank of Lieutenant-Colonel in the West Yorkshire militia and Royal Horse Guards.

== Personal life ==
Sotherton lived in Darrington, Pontefract. He married his wife, Sarah Shepley, 19 December 1793. He died on 31 January 1806.
