= James Marjoribanks =

Scottish career diplomat

Sir James Marjoribanks KCMG
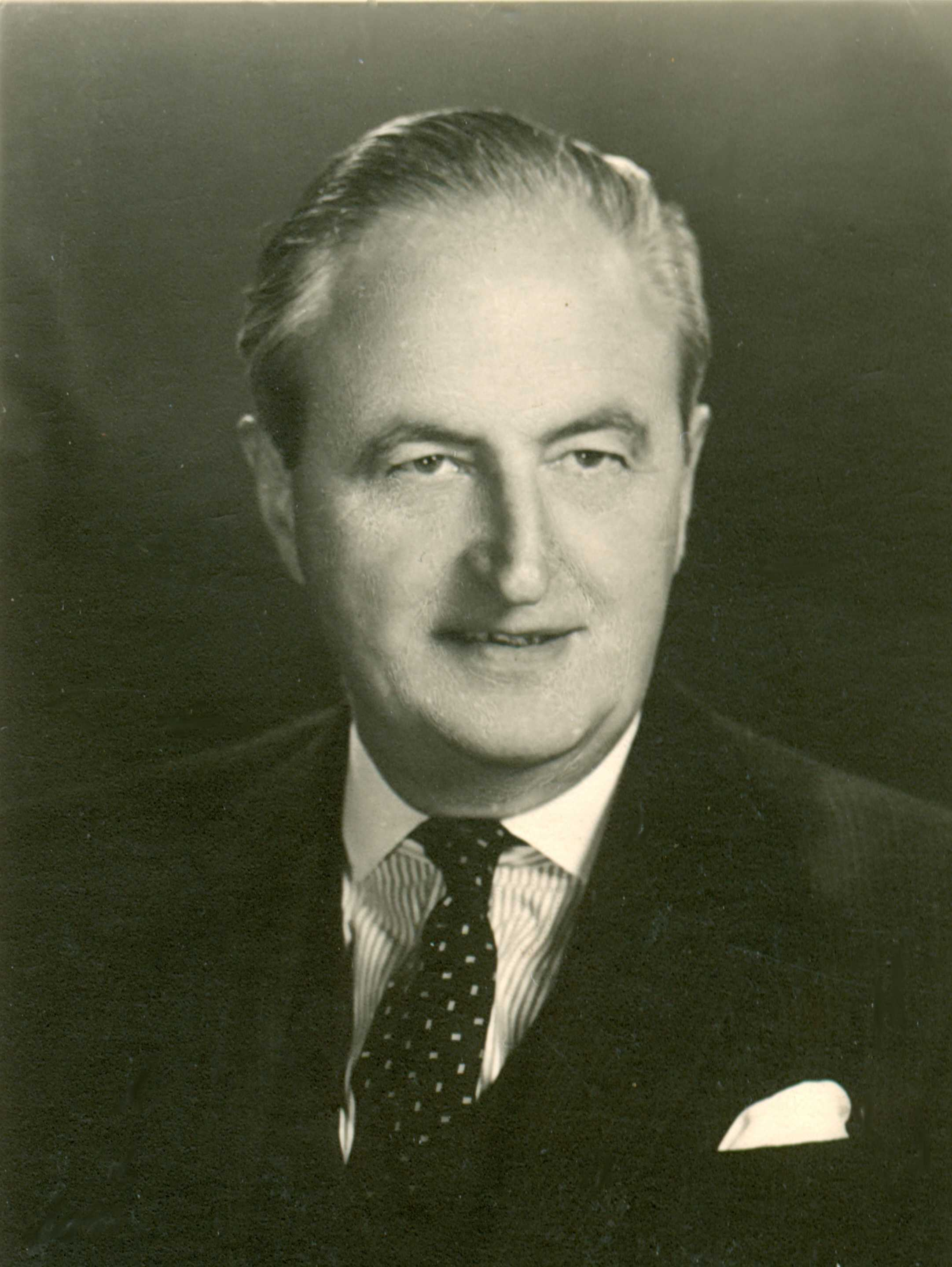
- Marjoribanks in 1965

Personal details
- Born: 29 May 1911 Colinton, Scotland
- Died: 29 January 2002 (aged 90) Edinburgh, Scotland
- Education: University of Edinburgh

Sir James Alexander Milne Marjoribanks KCMG (29 May 1911 – 29 January 2002) was a Scottish career diplomat in the British Foreign Service and became British ambassador to the European Economic Community. He presented Britain's application to join the European Community in 1967 and was instrumental in this application becoming successful.

== Background and family life ==
James Marjoribanks was born in Colinton manse, in south-west Edinburgh on 29 May 1911, the third son of Elizabeth Logan and Rev Dr Thomas Marjoribanks, a minister in the (presbyterian) Church of Scotland. His father and his brother William were respectively heads of the lowland Marjoribanks family. He was schooled at Merchiston Castle School and Edinburgh Academy.

In order to prepare for his entrance to the University of Edinburgh, where he was to study modern languages, he spent 1927–28 in Paris and the Convitto Maschile Valdese in Torre Pellice, Italy where he became fluent in Italian. This was to prove useful to him later. He graduated from the University of Edinburgh with a first class honours Master of Arts (Scotland) in 1932, and then studied German further in Bonn and Tübingen, Germany. He stayed for four months with a German newspaper proprietor's family which coincided with the accession to power of Adolf Hitler in January 1933. Marjoribanks noted that the general attitude was "We’ve tried everything else, so we might as well try Adolf. If he’s no good we’ll get rid of him". But, he also noted, it wasn't as easy as that. After the war, Marjoribanks discovered that a bomb had destroyed both the house and the parents of the host family. Two of the three sons had died on the Eastern Front.

Marjoribanks passed the British Foreign Service (later called the Foreign and Commonwealth Office) exams in 1933 and was posted to China in 1934.

== Diplomatic life ==
=== China (1934–1938) ===
Marjoribanks was first appointed probationary Vice-Consul in the British Chinese Consular Service in Peking and took up his post on 12 January 1935. He spent much of his first two years in China learning Mandarin, which he quickly spoke fluently, much to the admiration of his colleagues.

At a consular cocktail party, he was asked by the first secretary to mix the cocktails beforehand. Since Marjoribanks had grown up in a Scottish manse in the 1920s he knew nothing about mixing cocktails. So he liberally added portions from all the bottles of drinks available into the cocktail bowl. The cocktail was a great success. Afterwards, the first secretary said "Devilishly good cocktail, James!" and asked for the recipe. Marjoribanks replied gravely that the recipe was a "family secret!”

He had become engaged to Sonya Stanley Alder (sister of the portrait painter and author Vera Stanley Alder) in the UK and was allowed to send for her at the end of his two years probationary period. Sonya and James were married in the embassy chapel on 29 December 1936. The British ambassador, Sir Hughe Knatchbull-Hugessen (who later, as ambassador to Turkey, was notorious because of the German spy "Cicero" Elyesa Bazna) gave the bride away. They were married until Sonya's death in 1981.

On 6 March 1938, Marjoribanks was appointed Vice-Consul in Hankou where the Chiang Kai-shek government had set up its temporary headquarters after the fall of Nanjing. James noted that one of the last dispatches the Chinese government received in Nanjing from the British Embassy while the city was already burning and the Rape of Nanjing was taking place, was that "In future the import of grey squirrels into the United Kingdom is forbidden". There was a courteous acknowledgement from the Chinese Foreign office with an assurance that the information had been referred to the appropriate department. Hankou in turn became a very dangerous place after the rest of the British diplomatic staff left and the Japanese army occupied the city.

Marjoribanks helped several vulnerable Chinese friends escape but the cruelty of the Japanese occupation of Hankou left an indelible memory with him for the rest of his life. One of his motivations for his enthusiastic support for the European Community in later life was his memory of the horrors of war in Hankou. He escaped by plane from Hankou disguised as an Italian marine where his fluent Italian came in useful.

=== France (1939–1940) ===
On 27 September 1939 Marjoribanks was posted as Vice-Consul to Marseille, France. After the Fall of France, Marjoribanks was part of the negotiations with the Vichy France Government on the role of the French fleet under Admiral Darlan. The Royal Navy destroyed much of this fleet near Oran in 1940. Marjoribanks was also heavily involved in the evacuation of Marseille.

=== United States (1940–1944) ===
Marjoribanks next posting on 30 November 1940 was as Consul General to Jacksonville, Florida, United States, where he emphasised Britain's determination to fight on and encouraged the Americans to become more active in the war. His personal experience of Japanese and German aggression was very valuable to him when arguing the case for Britain. He came to know the Duke of Windsor who was governor of the Bahamas at that time. On 13 October 1942 Marjoribanks was moved to New York for two years where he was part of the diplomatic effort to work on the British "special relationship" with the American Government.

=== Romania (1944–1945) ===
In July 1944, Marjoribanks was sent as Political Representative and Consul to Bucharest, Romania, where he added the Romanian language to the long list of languages he could speak fluently. At that time, King Michael I of Romania had ousted the pro-Nazi dictator Ion Antonescu and Romania had become one of countries on the Allied side fighting the Axis. The Russians entered the country and imposed their own communist puppet regime under Petru Groza. In 1945, Marjoribanks gave the ousted head of the government, General Nicolae Rădescu sanctuary in the British legation and got him out of the country. Marjoribanks thus acquired knowledge of the way the Soviets work. This helped him in his next posting to the Council of Foreign Ministers, where the new European boundaries were being decided.

=== Council of Foreign Ministers (1945–1947) ===
The British Foreign Office in 1945, appointed Marjoribanks to represent Britain at the Council of Foreign Ministers which was intended to settle territorial questions and conclude post-war peace treaties. The Ministers met in London and Moscow in 1945 and in Paris in 1946 but difficulties in negotiating with the Russians became apparent. Marjoribanks was as a member of a four-man international team that obtained agreement on redrawing the Franco-Italian border.

=== Austrian State Treaty (1947–1950) ===
In November 1947, Marjoribanks was next appointed to be Deputy to the British Secretary of State for Foreign and Commonwealth Affairs, Ernest Bevin at the Council of Foreign Ministers with responsibility for representing Britain at the peace treaty negotiations for Austria. It was a protracted process. The negotiations became particularly difficult when Russia started the Berlin Blockade which lead to the Berlin Airlift and the Partition of Germany. When the German peace talks at the Council foundered due to Soviet intransigence in 1947, Marjoribanks and his colleagues requested that the Austrian treaty negotiators be allowed to continue which was accepted. To the credit of these negotiators, the talks continued until, after Stalin's death, the Russians signed the Austrian State Treaty, withdrew from the country and Austria remained outside the Iron Curtain. This was a rare example of the Soviets withdrawing from occupied territories after the war. The Foreign Service now began to take more notice of this talented diplomat.

=== Australia (1950–1952) ===
Marjoribanks became ill with blood poisoning, was promoted to Counsellor and seconded to the British Commonwealth Relations Office posted on 12 January 1950 to Canberra, Australia. He worked there as Official Secretary to the British High Commission.

=== Luxembourg (1952–1955) ===
Marjoribanks then had several important European postings, which were the culmination of his diplomatic career. On 31 August 1952 he was appointed Deputy Head of the British delegation to the European Coal and Steel Community in Luxembourg. This was the forerunner of the European Economic Community and European Union. The head of the delegation was a fellow Scot, the businessman Sir Cecil Weir. Marjoribanks became convinced here that the future for Europe was in closer integration but the political will did not exist in London.

Weir and Marjoribanks posed the following question in one of their first messages to London in 1952: "…whether we have determined in our own minds that we want the [European] integration movement to succeed... If we do want it to succeed, we should surely put behind it the full force of our influence. If we want to cut it short and prevent its development to a political authority which might eventually become a federal state, it would surely be better for us not to wish it success". The Foreign Office replied that European integration would never succeed. Marjoribanks was appointed Companion of the Order of St Michael and St George (CMG) on 10 June 1954.

=== United Kingdom (1955–57) ===
On 12 September 1955 Marjoribanks was seconded to the British Cabinet Office for two years. He had strong personal misgivings during the Suez Crisis but in spite of this the Foreign Secretary Selwyn Lloyd regarded him with much approval.

=== Germany (1957–1962) ===
Marjoribanks was next posted to the British Embassy in Bonn on 8 September 1957 as Minister (Economic). He received little encouragement from the British Ambassador who regarded trade and commerce as something beneath a gentleman's dignity and, like the Foreign Office, was lukewarm about European integration. In spite of these difficulties, Marjoribanks enthusiastically launched a trade drive for exports from Britain to Germany. With his fluent German, Marjoribanks developed many personal contacts in the business community in Germany – including Ludwig Erhard, the author of the German economic miracle. In five years, Marjoribanks achieved a spectacular increase in exports from Britain to Germany that was long remembered after he left Germany.

=== United Kingdom (1962–1965) ===
On 17 September 1962 Marjoribanks was transferred for three years to London as Assistant Under-Secretary of State to the Foreign Office working for British Foreign Secretary, Reginald Maudling and Alec Douglas-Home.

=== Belgium (1965–1971) ===
Marjoribanks was appointed Knight Commander of the Order of St Michael and St George (KCMG) in 1965 and also appointed Ambassador to the European Economic Community (EEC) and its sister communities in Brussels. He occupied this post during the protracted negotiations that eventually led to Britain's acceptance into the EEC. On 12 May 1967 he presented Britain's ultimately successful application to Renaat Van Elslande, who was in charge of the Presidency of the Council of the European Union. Most of the time, he worked for either the Labour Foreign Secretary Michael Stewart or George Brown (both of whom regarded him as suitable for this critical post). Finally, he worked for the Conservative Foreign Secretary Alec Douglas-Home. Marjoribanks and the various Foreign Secretaries succeeded in coming up with new ways of approaching the negotiations for Britain's entry into the EEC. General Charles de Gaulle raised numerous objections to Britain's entry which Marjoribanks and the Foreign Secretary of the time were able to overcome. Marjoribanks worked consistently at making useful contacts within the EEC and then astutely advised Whitehall on developments which might affect Britain's application to enter the Common Market.

In 1971, he retired at the official Foreign Office retirement age of 60 but made no secret of his regret at having to leave the negotiations a year and a half before their final successful outcome. He was widely respected in Brussels and some of the compliments he got from his contemporaries when he retired were – best person to manage the British Foreign Secretary George Brown (who was notorious for his temper and rudeness); – loyal, lucid and clear-thinking (France's chief negotiator Jean Marc Boegner); and – an extremely good and skilful negotiator (British Prime Minister Ted Heath).

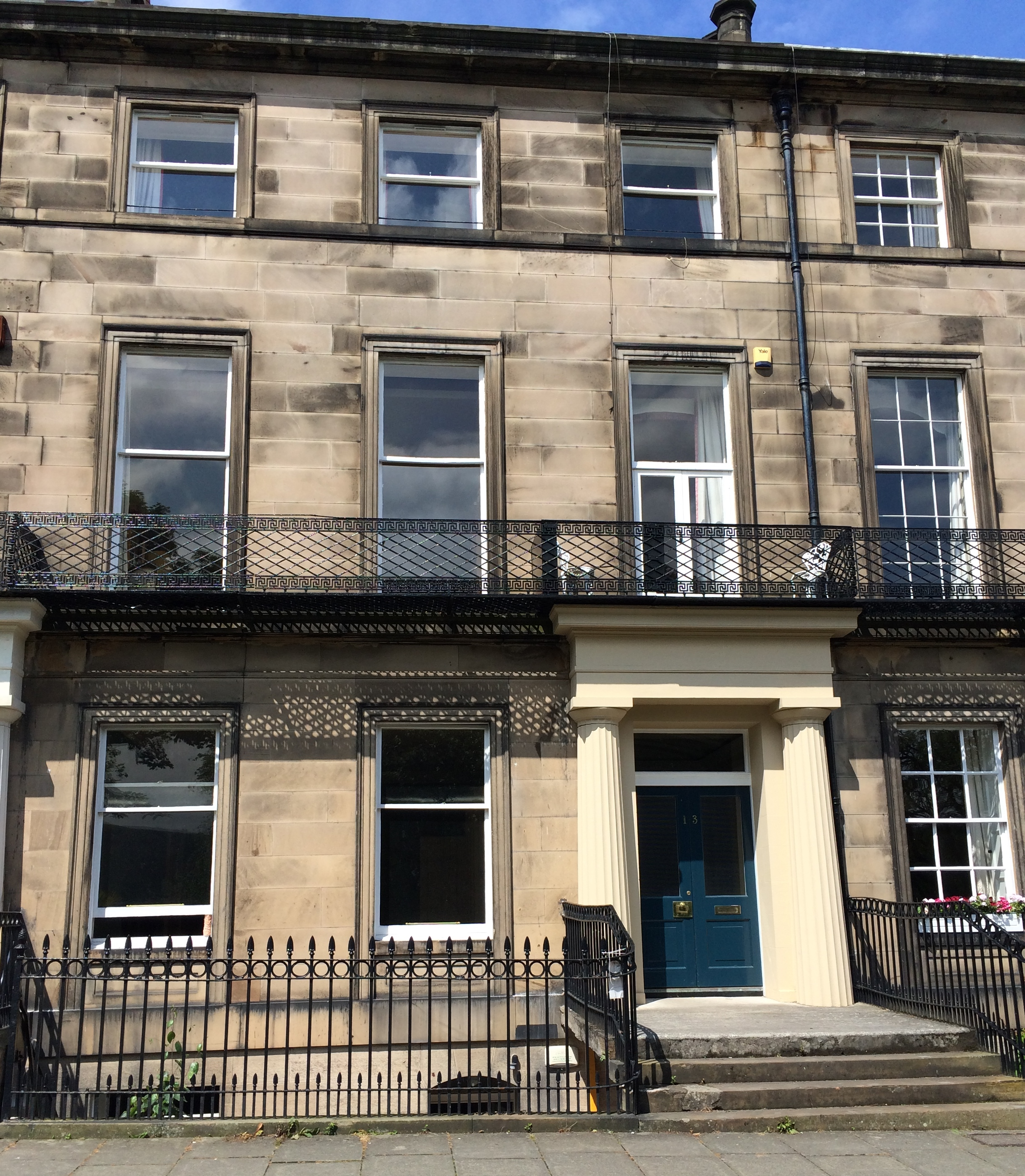
13 Regent Terrace, Edinburgh, home of Sir James

== Retirement ==
Marjoribanks retired to Edinburgh where he lived at Regent Terrace, and resumed climbing Scottish mountains as he had done in his youth. He was an expert croquet player, often having discussed tactics with his delegation on the croquet lawn of his Brussels residence.

Marjoribanks was tall and imposing, with a relaxed approach to life. He was an experienced raconteur and, with his keen sense of humour, devised and illustrated various books containing caricatures. He was also an expert at black pen-and-ink drawings.

He was a member of the Scottish Council for Development and Industry's Committee on European Regional Policy from 1971 to 1983 and became its vice-president. He served as a director of the Distillers Company from 1971 to 1975 and, during this time, the full realisation of the problems associated with the drug thalidomide emerged. In spite of these problems having started long before he joined Distillers, the situation caused him concern and he became a spokesman for the board. He was also a director of Inveresk Research International, a Scottish research company working with the pharmaceutical industry. In 1975, Marjoribanks joined the Court of the University of Edinburgh as a General Council Assessor. From 1979 to 1990 he was chairman of a successful pro-European pressure group called 'Scotland in Europe'.

Marjoribanks was chairman of the Robert Louis Stevenson Memorial Appeal which raised money to erect a memorial to the author in Edinburgh, and also for children with respiratory disorders. He had grown up in Colinton manse, where Robert Louis Stevenson composed his book A Child's Garden of Verses.

Shortly before he died in Edinburgh, his daughter Patricia showed him Euro coins and bank notes.
