= Los Angeles Temple =

Los Angeles temple may refer to:

- Thien Hau Temple (Los Angeles) - a Chinese temple located in Los Angeles's Chinatown in California, dedicated to the ocean goddess Mazu.
- Senshin Buddhist Temple - a Buddhist temple in Los Angeles, California, affiliated with the Buddhist Churches of America (BCA).
- Koyasan Buddhist Temple - a Japanese Buddhist temple in the Little Tokyo district of Downtown Los Angeles, California.
- Los Angeles California Temple - the tenth operating and the second-largest temple operated by The Church of Jesus Christ of Latter-day Saints.
- St. Louis Jain temple - a historic structure that was constructed for the 1904 St. Louis World's fairs, now standing within the Jain Center of Southern California in Los Angeles.
- Amica Temple of Radiance - a new religious movement begun in 1959 in Los Angeles by Roland Hunt and Dorothy Bailey.
- Angelus Temple - a Pentecostal megachurch of the International Church of the Foursquare Gospel in the Echo Park district of Los Angeles, California.
- Jewish Temples in the Los Angeles metro area:
  - Temple Beth Am (Los Angeles, California)
  - Temple Israel of Hollywood
  - Sephardic Temple Tifereth Israel
  - Sinai Temple (Los Angeles)
  - Stephen S. Wise Temple
  - Temple Beth Israel of Highland Park and Eagle Rock
  - Wilshire Boulevard Temple
