= Alexander Marjoribanks =

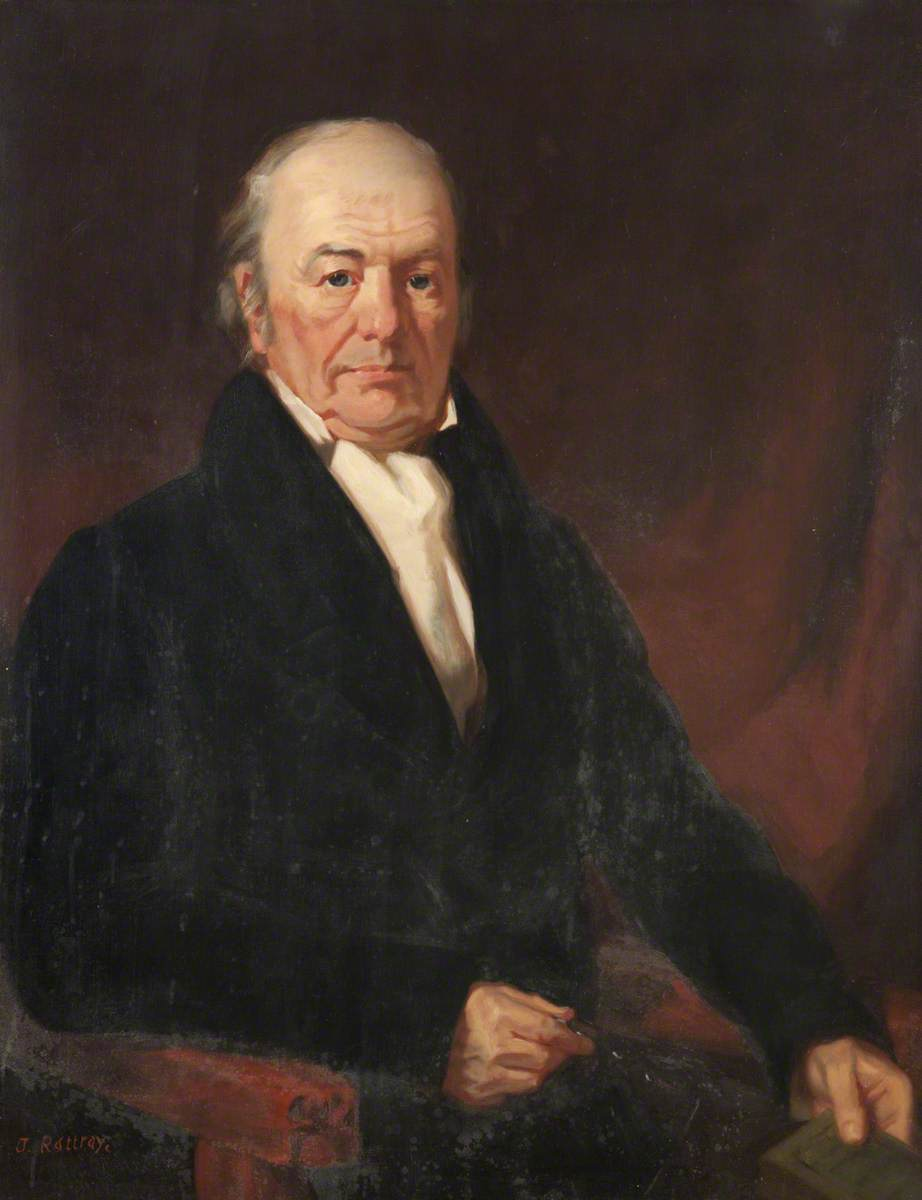
- Born: November 29, 1750; Bathgate, Scotland
- Died: September 8, 1830; Bathgate, Scotland
- Resting place: Kirkton Cemetery, Bathgate, Scotland
- Occupation: Provost of Bathgate

Alexander Marjoribanks was born 29 November 1750 and served as the first provost of Bathgate, Scotland and magistrate and convenor of Linlithgowshire.

He was a trustee of John Newland's will and ensure the construction of Old Bathgate Academy.

== Life ==
The Marjoribanks family held the seat of Balbardie, in Bathgate, since the 1624. His father Alexander Marjoribanks had strong family ties to the area, particularly that of his sister who was the wife of James Wardrop senior, parents of King George IV's surgeon James Wardrop.

He married Katherine Laurie, daughter of Gilbert Laurie of Polmont, in 1790.

He became convenor of Linlithgowshire and held the role for more than 30 years. He was proprietor and superior of the barony of Bathgate, which was part of the extensive possessions given by King Robert the Bruce to his daughter Princess Marjorie as part of her Dowry when she married Sir Walter Stewart, 6th High Steward of Scotland.

In 1824, he gave up his superiority so that Bathgate may become a burgh of barony. He was chosen to be the town's first provost.
