= Destruction of country houses in 20th-century Britain =

Demolition of several larger mansion estates in the UK during the 20th century

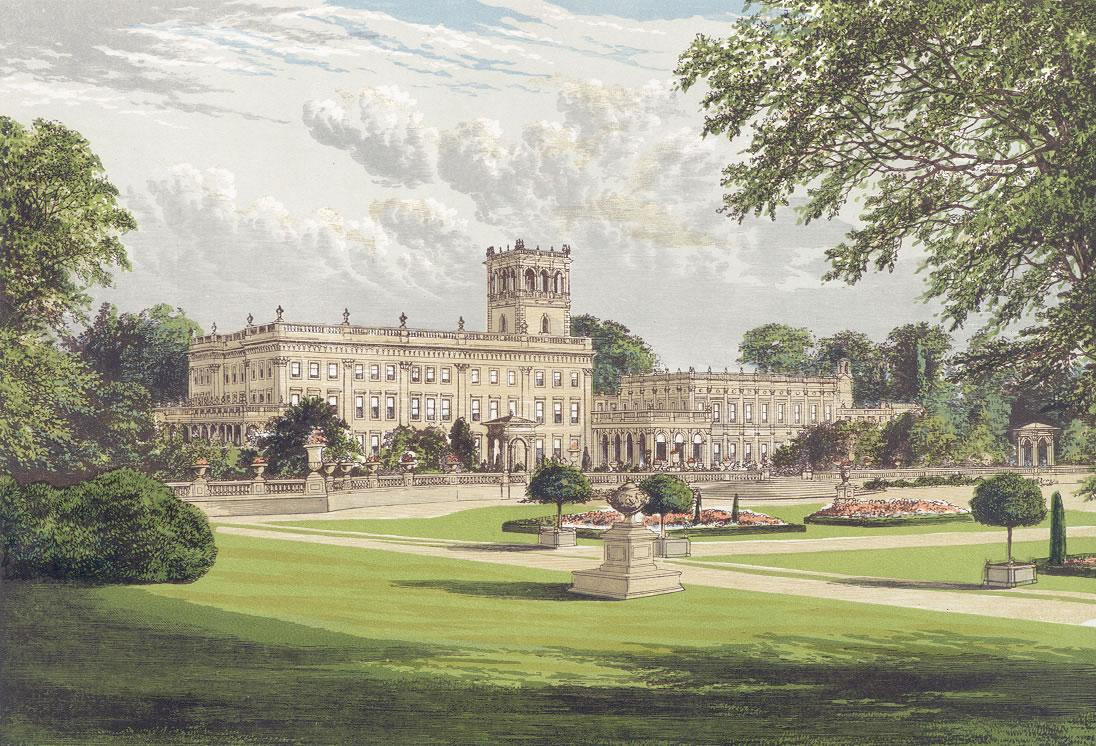
Trentham Hall in Staffordshire was so lavish that in 1873 the visiting Shah of Persia remarked to the future King Edward VII of their host, "too grand for a subject; you'll have to have his head off when you come to the throne."

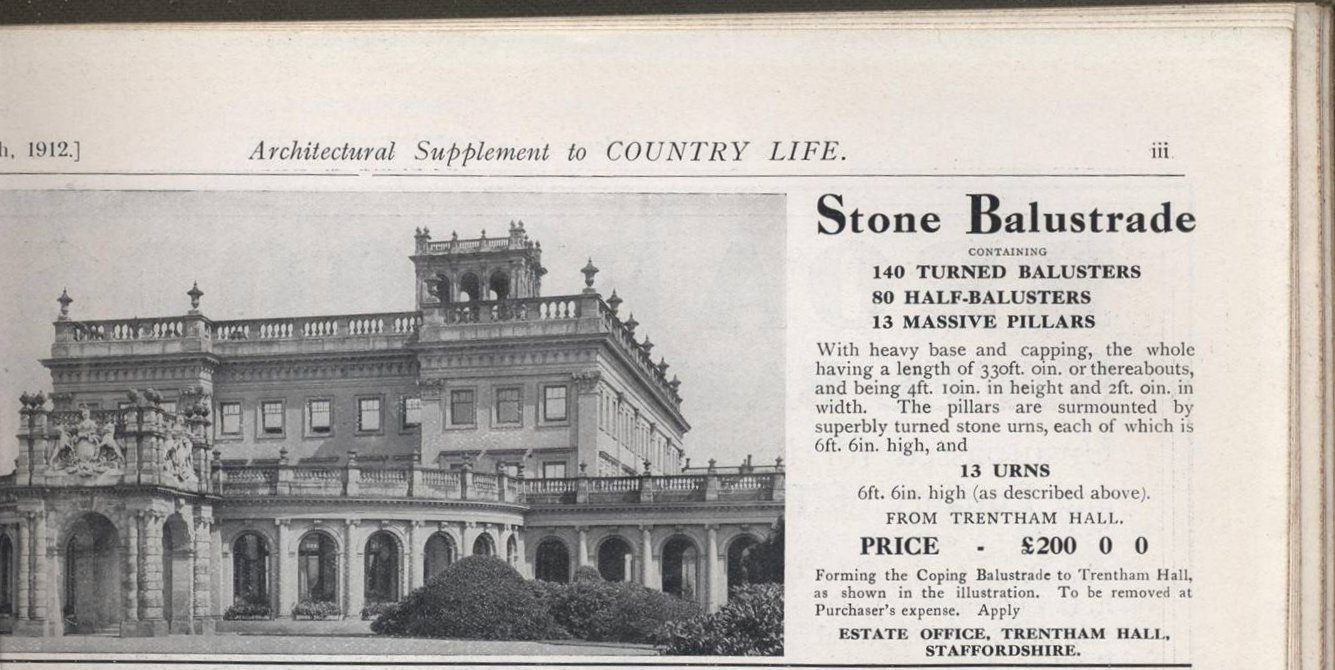
An advertisement, from 1912, for the roofing balustrade and urns from the demolished Trentham Hall

The destruction of country houses in 20th-century Britain was the result of a change in social conditions: many country houses of varying architectural merit were demolished by their owners. Collectively termed by several authors "the lost houses", the destruction of these now often-forgotten houses has been described as a cultural tragedy.

The British nobility had been demolishing some of their country houses since the 15th century, when comfort replaced fortification as an essential need. For many, demolishing and rebuilding their country homes became a lifelong hobby, in particular during the 18th century when it became fashionable to take the Grand Tour and return home with art treasures, supposedly brought from classical civilizations. During the 19th century, many houses were enlarged to accommodate the increasing numbers of servants needed to create the famed country house lifestyle. Less than a century later, this often meant they were of an unmanageable size.

In the early 20th century, the demolition accelerated, while rebuilding largely ceased. The demolitions were not confined to England, but spread throughout Britain. By the end of the century, even some of the "new" country houses by the architect Edwin Lutyens had been demolished. There were a number of reasons: social, political and, most importantly, financial. In rural areas, the destruction of the country houses and their estates was tantamount to a social revolution. Well into the 20th century, it was common for the local squire to provide large-scale employment, housing, and patronage to the village school, parish church, and a cottage hospital. The "big house" was the bedrock of rural society.

Since 1900, 1,200 country houses have been demolished in England. In Scotland, the figure is proportionally higher. There, 378 architecturally important country houses have been demolished, 200 of these since the end of World War II in 1945. Included in the destruction were works by Robert Adam, including Balbardie House and the monumental Hamilton Palace. One firm, Charles Brand of Dundee, demolished at least 56 country houses in Scotland in the 20 years between 1945 and 1965. In England, it has been estimated that one in six of all country houses were demolished during the 20th century.

== Historical background ==
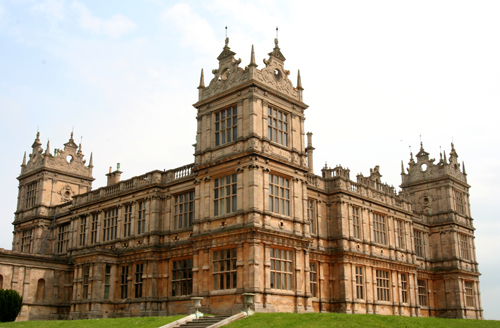
During the 20th century, the dispersal of a country house's contents became a frequent event. The 1977 sale of Mentmore Towers' contents highlighted the issue.

Two years before the beginning of World War I, on 4 May 1912, the British magazine Country Life carried a seemingly unremarkable advertisement: the roofing balustrade and urns from the roof of Trentham Hall could be purchased for £200. One of Britain's great ducal country houses, Trentham Hall was demolished with little public comment or interest. It was its owner's property, to do with as he wished. There was no reason for public interest or concern; the same magazine had frequently published in-depth articles on new country houses being built, designed by fashionable architects such as Edwin Lutyens. As far as general opinion was concerned, England's great houses came and they went; as long as their numbers remained, continuing to provide local employment, the public were not largely concerned. The Country Life advertisement, however, was to prove a hint of things to come.

Before World War I only a few houses were demolished, but the pace increased: by 1955, one house was being demolished every five days. As early as 1944, the trustees of Castle Howard, convinced there was no future for Britain's great houses, had begun selling the house's contents. Increasing taxation and a shortage of staff meant that the old way of life had ended. The wealth and status of the owner provided no protection to the building: even the wealthier owners became keen to free themselves of not only the expense of a large house, but also the trappings of wealth and privilege which the house represented.

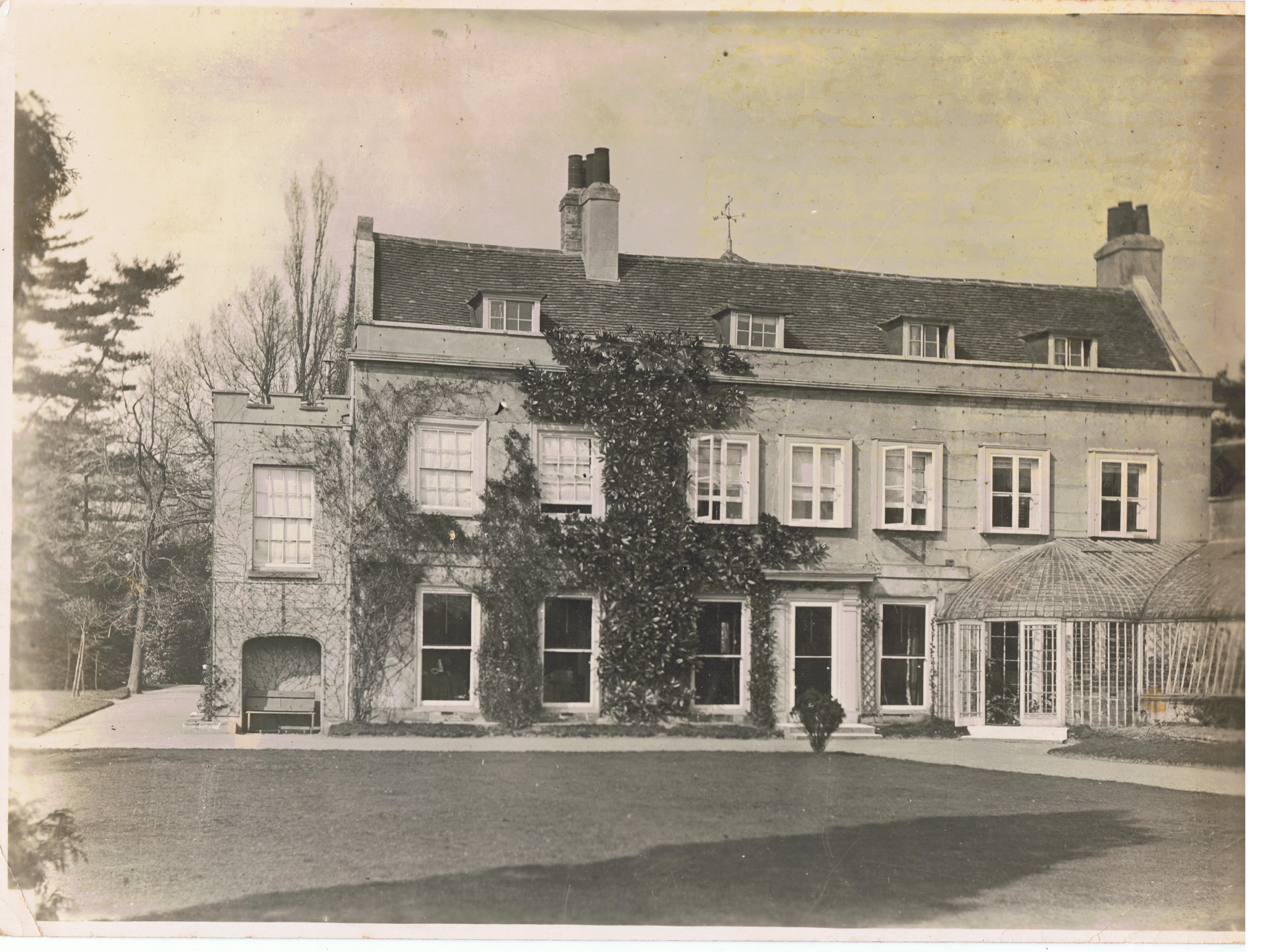
Small country house: Dawley Court, Uxbridge (c. 1894), was sold with 20 acres in 1929 for £10,000, and demolished soon after.

Thus, it was not just the smaller country houses of the gentry which were wiped from their – often purposely built – landscapes, but also the huge ducal palaces. Alfred Waterhouse's Gothic Eaton Hall, owned by Britain's wealthiest peer, was razed to the ground in 1963, and replaced by a smaller modern building. Sixteen years earlier the Duke of Bedford had reduced Woburn Abbey to half its original size, destroying façades and interiors by both Henry Flitcroft and Henry Holland. The Duke of Devonshire saved Hardwick Hall by surrendering it to H.M. Treasury in lieu of death duties, which were charged at up to 80% of the total value of an estate, but this solution was rarely acceptable to the government. As late as 1975, the British Labour government refused to save Mentmore, thus causing the dispersal, and emigration, of one of the country's finest art collections.

In the 1960s, historians and public bodies had begun to realise the loss to the nation of this destruction. However, the process of change was long, and it was not until 1984 with the preservation of Calke Abbey that it became obvious that opinion had changed. A large public appeal assured the preservation of Tyntesfield in 2002, and in 2007, Dumfries House and its collection were saved, after protracted appeals and debates. Today, demolition has ceased to be a realistic, or legal, option for listed buildings, and an historic house (particularly one with its contents intact) has become recognized as worthy of retention and preservation. However, many country houses are still at risk, and their security, even as an entirety with their contents, is not guaranteed by any legislation.

== Impoverished owners and a plethora of country houses ==
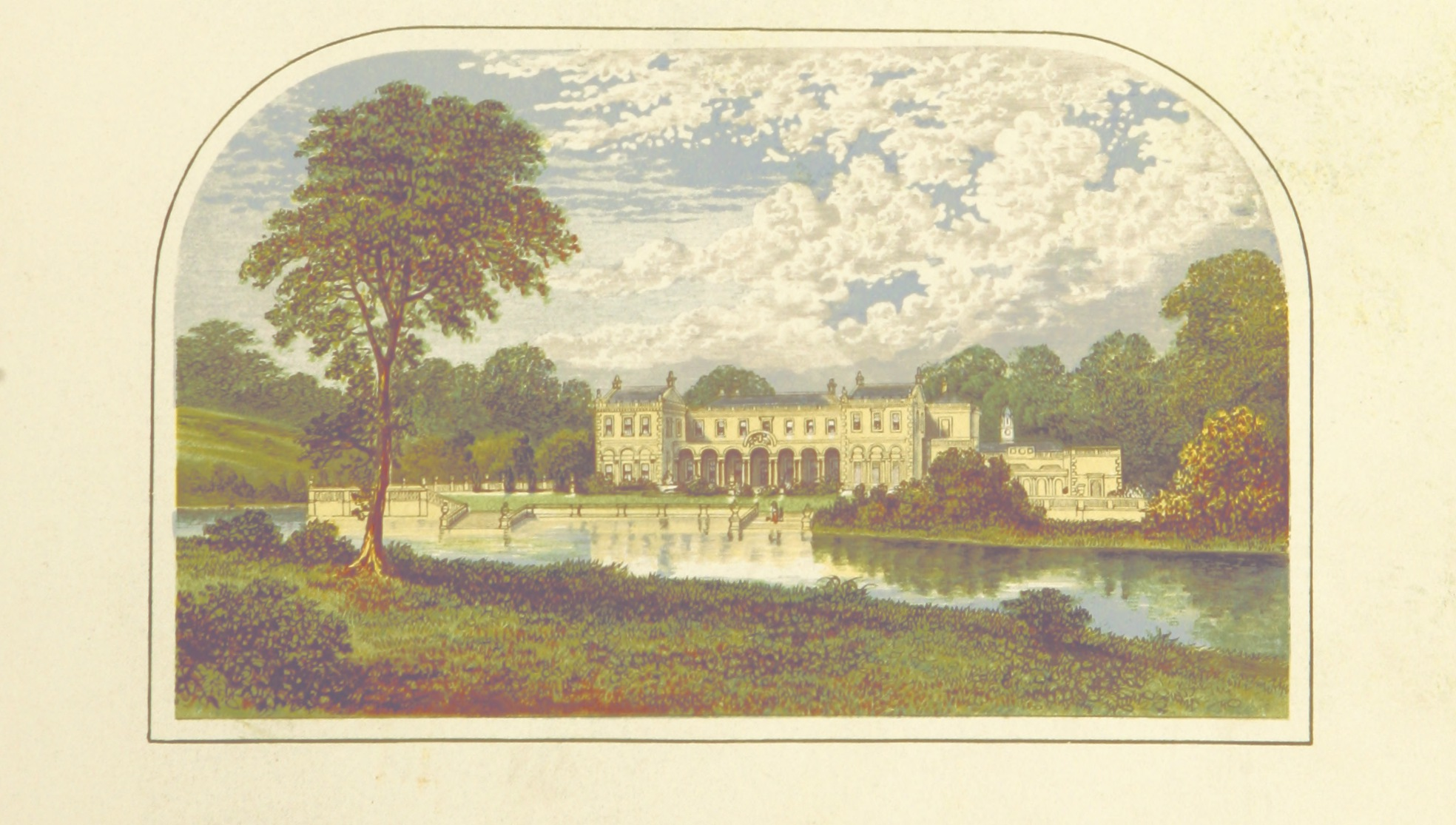
Clumber Park in Nottinghamshire, the seat of the Dukes of Newcastle, was demolished in 1938.

When Evelyn Waugh's novel Brideshead Revisited, portraying life in the English country house, was published in 1945, its first few chapters offered a glimpse of an exclusive and enviable world, a world of beautiful country houses with magnificent contents, privileged occupants, a profusion of servants and great wealth. Yet, in its final chapters, Brideshead's author accurately documented a changing and fading world, a world in which the country house as a symbol of power, privilege and a natural order, was not to exist.

As early as June 1940, while Britain was embroiled in the early days of World War II, The Times, confident of future victory, advised its readers that "a new order cannot be based on the preservation of privilege, whether the privilege be that of a county, a class, or an individual." Thus it was after the end of the war, as the government handed back the requisitioned, war-torn and frequently dilapidated mansions to their often demoralised and impoverished owners; it was during a period of not just mounting taxation, to pay for a costly war, but also a time when it seemed all too clear that the old order had passed. In this political climate, many felt it the only option to abandon their ancestral piles. Thus, following the cessation of hostilities, the trickle of demolitions which had begun in the earlier part of the century became a torrent of destruction.

Destroying buildings of national or potential national importance was not an act peculiar to the 20th century in Britain. The demolition in 1874 of Northumberland House, London, a prime example of English Renaissance architecture, passed without significant comment. Town houses such as Northumberland House were highly visible displays of wealth and political power, so consequently more likely to be the victims of changing fashions.

The difference in the 20th century was that the acts of demolition were often acts of desperation and last resort; a demolished house could not be valued for probate duty. A vacant site was attractive to property developers, who would pay a premium for an empty site that could be rebuilt upon and filled with numerous small houses and bungalows, which would return a quick profit. This was especially true in the years immediately following World War II, when Britain was desperate to replace the thousands of homes destroyed. Thus, in many cases, the demolition of the ancestral seat, strongly entwined with the family's history and identity, followed the earlier loss of the family's London house.

A significant factor, which explained the seeming ease with which a British aristocrat could dispose of his ancestral seat, was the aristocratic habit of only marrying within the aristocracy and whenever possible to a sole heiress. This meant that by the 20th century, many owners of country houses often owned several country mansions. Thus it became a favoured option to select the most conveniently sited (whether for privacy or sporting reasons), easily managed, or of greatest sentimental value; fill it with the choicest art works from the other properties; and then demolish the less favoured. Thus, one solution not only solved any financial problems, but also removed an unwanted burden.

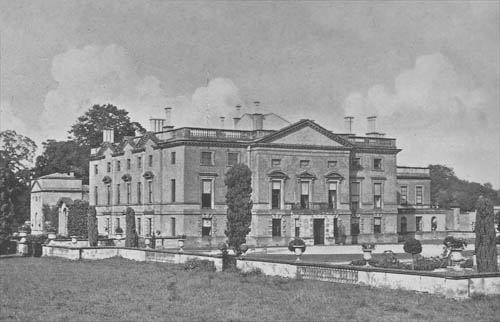
Stanwick Park in North Yorkshire circa 1900, sold by the Duke of Northumberland, for demolition, to save Alnwick Castle. One of the Duke's five country houses.

The vast majority of the houses demolished were of less architectural importance than the great Baroque, Palladian and Neoclassical mansions by the notable architects. These smaller, but often aesthetically pleasing houses belonged to the gentry rather than the aristocracy; in these cases the owners, little more than gentlemen farmers, often razed the ancestral home to save costs and thankfully moved into a smaller but more comfortable farmhouse or purpose-built new house on the estate.

Occasionally an aristocrat of the first rank did find himself in dire financial troubles. The severely impoverished Duke of Marlborough saved Blenheim Palace by marrying an heiress, tempted from the US by the lure of an old title in return for vast riches. Not all were so fortunate or seemingly eligible. When 2nd Duke of Buckingham found himself bankrupt in 1848, he sold the contents of Stowe House, one of Britain's grandest houses. It proved to be a temporary solution; his heirs, the 3rd and final Duke of Buckingham and his heirs, the Earls Temple, inherited huge financial problems until finally in 1922 anything left that was moveable, both internal and external, was auctioned off and the house sold, narrowly escaping demolition. It was saved by being transformed into a school.

Less fortunate was Clumber Park, the principal home of the Dukes of Newcastle. Selling the Hope Diamond and other properties failed to solve the family problems, leaving no alternative but demolition of the huge, expensive-to-maintain house, which was razed to the ground in 1938, leaving the Duke without a ducal seat. Plans to rebuild a smaller house on the site were never executed. Other high-ranking members of the peerage were also forced to off-load minor estates and seats; the Duke of Northumberland retained Alnwick Castle, but sold Stanwick Park in North Yorkshire to be demolished, leaving him with four other country seats remaining. Likewise the Duke of Bedford kept Woburn Abbey, considerably reduced in size, after World War II, while selling other family estates and houses. Whatever the personal choices and reasons for the sales and demolitions, the underlying and unifying factor was almost always financial. This began long before the 20th century with the gradual introduction and increase of taxes on income and further tax on inherited wealth, death duties.

== Direct causes ==
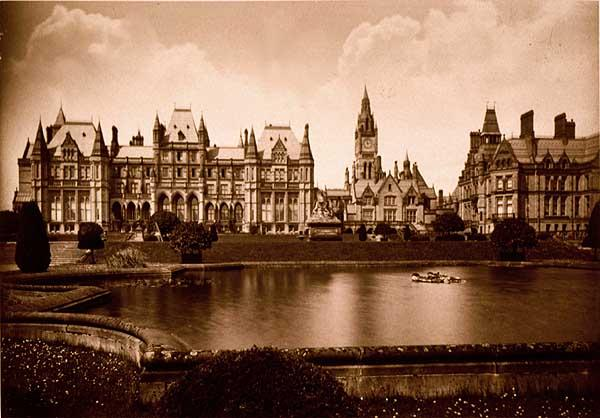
Alfred Waterhouse's Eaton Hall in Cheshire was demolished in 1963 by the 4th Duke of Westminster, Britain's wealthiest peer, at a time when Victorian architecture was unappreciated. It was replaced by a much smaller modern house. Eaton Chapel (centre right) survives.

Before the 19th century, the British upper classes enjoyed a life relatively free from taxation. Staff were plentiful and cheap, and estates not only provided a generous income from tenanted land but also political power. During the 19th century this began to change as the House of Lords lost its power to the House of Commons, by the mid-20th century their political power had weakened and they faced heavy tax burdens, due to the People's Budget implemented by the Liberal government of David Lloyd George. The staff had either been killed in two world wars or forsaken a life of servitude for better wages elsewhere. Thus the owners of large country houses dependent on staff and a large income began by necessity to dispose of their costly non-self-sustaining material assets. Large houses had become redundant white elephants to be abandoned or demolished. It seemed that in particular regard to the country houses no one was prepared to save them.

There are several reasons which had brought about this situation – most significantly in the early 20th century there was no firmly upheld legislation to protect what is now considered to be the nation's heritage. Additionally, public opinion did not have the sentiment and interest in national heritage that is evident in Britain today. When the loss of Britain's architectural heritage reached its height at the rate of one house every five days in 1955, few were particularly interested or bothered. In the immediate aftermath of World War II, to the British public still suffering from the deprivations of food rationing and restriction on building work the destruction of these great redundant houses was of little interest. From 1914 onwards there had been a huge exodus away from a life in domestic service; having experienced the less restricted and better-paid life away from the great estates, few were anxious to return – this in itself was a further reason that life in the English country house was becoming near impossible to all but the very rich.

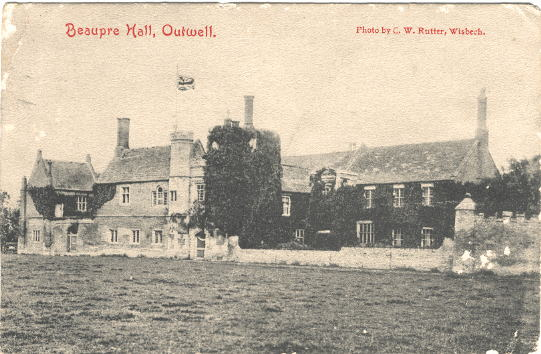
Beaupré Hall in Outwell in Norfolk, a fortified mansion, complete with castellated gatehouse, exemplified early domestic architecture. Shortly before its demolition in 1966 it was photographed with an advancing army of small, box-like bungalows within metres of the medieval walls.

Another consideration was education. Before the late 1950s and the advent of the stately home business, very few working-class people had seen the upstairs of these great houses; those who had were there only to clean and serve, with an obligation to keep their eyes down, rather than uplift them and be educated. Thus ignorance of the nation's heritage was a large contributory factor to the indifference that met the destruction.

There were, however, reasons other than public indifference. Successive legislation involving national heritage, often formulated by the aristocracy themselves, had omitted any reference to private houses. The main reasons that so many British country houses were destroyed during the second half of the 20th century are politics and social conditions. During the Second World War many large houses were requisitioned, and subsequently for the duration of the war were used for the billeting of military personnel, government operations, hospitals, schools and a myriad of other uses far removed from the purpose for which they were designed. At the end of the war when handed back to the owners, many were in a poor or ruinous state of repair.

During the next two decades, restrictions were applied to building works as Britain was rebuilt, priority being given to replacing what had been lost during the war rather than the oversized home of an elite family. In addition, death duties were raised to all-time highs by the new Labour Government that swept into power in 1945; this hit Britain's aristocracy hard. These factors, coupled with a decrease in people available or willing to work as servants, left the owners of country houses facing major problems of how to manage their estates. The most obvious solution was to off-load the cash-eating family mansion. Many were offered for sale as suitable for institutional use; those not readily purchased were speedily demolished. In the years immediately after the war, the law was powerless — even had it wished to — to stop the demolition of a private house no matter how architecturally important.

=== Loss of income from the estate ===
Before the 1870s, these estates often encompassed several thousand acres, generally consisting of several farms let to tenants; the great house was supplied with food from its own home farm (for meat and dairy) and a kitchen garden (for fruit and vegetables). While such estates were sufficiently profitable to maintain the mansion and provide a partial—if not complete—income, the agricultural depression from the 1870s onwards changed the viability of estates in general. Previously, such holdings yielded at least enough to fund loans on the large debts and mortgages usually undertaken to fund a lavish lifestyle, often spent in entertaining both on the country estate and "in town", in the family's large house of equal status in London.

By 1880, the so-called Long Depression had led some holders into financial shortfalls as they tried to balance maintenance of their estate with the income it provided. Some relied on funds from secondary sources such as banking and trade while others, like the severely impoverished Duke of Marlborough, sought American heiresses.

=== Loss of political power ===
The country houses have been described as "power houses", from which their owners controlled not only the vast surrounding estates, but also, through political influence, the people living in the locality. Political elections held in public before 1872 gave suffrage to only a limited section of the community, many of whom were the landowner's friends, tradesmen with whom he dealt, senior employees or tenants. The local landowner often not only owned an elector's house, but was also his employer, and it was not prudent for the voter to be seen publicly voting against his local candidate.

The Representation of the People Act 1884 widened the number of males eligible to vote to 60% of the population. Males paying an annual rental of £10, or holding land valued at £10 or over, were now eligible to vote. The other factor was the reorganization of constituency boundaries, and a candidate who for years had been returned unopposed suddenly found part of his electorate was from an area outside of his influence. Thus the national power of the landed aristocrats and gentry was slowly diminished. The ruling class was slowly ceasing to rule. In 1888 the creation of local elected authorities in the form of county councils eroded their immediate local power too. The final blow, the Parliament Act 1911, proved to be the beginning of the end for the country house lifestyle which had been enjoyed in a similar way for generations of the upper classes.

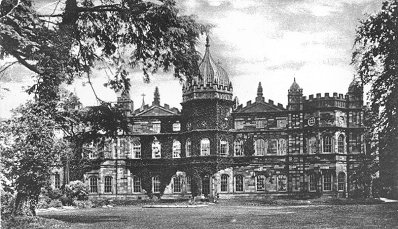
Tong Castle in Shropshire, which was demolished in 1954. Often a demolition became a public entertainment: "... then, on 18th July 1954, a large crowd gathered to watch this historic event. The operation was conducted by the 213 Field Squadron Royal Engineers (T.A.). 208 boreholes were placed around the building, using 136lb of plastic explosive, and 75lb of amatol. The Church windows were opened to cope with the blast. At 2.30pm Lord Newport fired the charges ... there are some fine photographs of this event, with the whole base of the Castle covered in smoke."

As land prices and incomes continued to fall, the great London palaces were the first casualties; the peer no longer needed to use his London house to maintain a high prestige presence in the capital. Its site was often more valuable empty than with the anachronistic palace in situ; selling them for redevelopment was the obvious first choice to raise some fast cash. The second choice was to sell part of the landed estate, especially if had been purchased in order to expand political territory. In fact, the buying of land in earlier times, before the reforms of 1885, to expand political territory had had a detrimental effect on country houses too.

Often when a second estate was purchased to expand another, the purchased estate also had a country house. If the land (and its subsequent local influence) was the only requirement, its house would then be let or neglected, often both. This was certainly the case at Tong Castle (see below) and many other houses. A large unwanted country house unsupported by land quickly became a liability.

=== Loss of wealth through taxation ===
==== Income tax ====
Income tax was first introduced in Great Britain in 1799 as a means of subsidising the Napoleonic Wars. While not imposed in Ireland, the rate of 10% on the total income, with reductions only possible in incomes below £200, immediately hit the better off. The tax was repealed for a brief period in 1802 during a cessation in hostilities with the French, but its reintroduction in 1803 set the pattern for all future taxation in Britain. While the tax was again repealed following the victory at Waterloo, the advantages of such taxation were now obvious. In 1841, after the election victory of Sir Robert Peel, the exchequer was so depleted that the tax made a surprise return on incomes above £150, while still known as a "temporary tax".

It was never again repealed. Throughout the 19th century, tax thresholds remained high, permitting the wealthy to live comfortably while paying minimal tax; until in 1907, H. H. Asquith introduced 'differentiation', a tax designed to be more punitive to those with investments rather than an earned income, which directly hit the aristocracy and gentry. Two years later, Lloyd George in his People's Budget of 1909 announced plans for a supertax for the rich, but the bill introducing the tax was defeated in the House of Lords. This respite for owners of large country houses, many of them members of the House of Lords, was brief and ultimately self-defeating: the bill's defeat led to the Parliament Act 1911 which removed the Lords' power of veto. In 1932, the threat through taxation to the nation's heritage was recognized, and appeals were made for repairs to National Trust and historic properties by their tenants to be tax-deductible; however the pleas were ignored.

==== Death duties ====
The houses lost were in all architectural styles. St Leonard's Hill, Windsor, a 19th-century house in the chateauesque style, was allowed to fall into ruin.

Death duties are the taxes most commonly associated with the decline of the British country house. They are not, in fact, a phenomenon peculiar to the 20th century, as they had first been introduced in 1796. "Legacy duty" was a tax payable on money bequeathed from a personal estate. Next of kin inheriting were exempt from payment, but anyone other than wives and children of the deceased had to pay on an increasing scale depending on the distance of the relationship from the deceased. These taxes gradually increased not only the percentage of the estate that had to be paid, but also to include closer heirs liable to payment. By 1815, the tax was payable by all except the spouse of the deceased.

In 1853, a new tax was introduced, "succession duty". This not only resulted in tax being payable on all forms of inheritance, but also removed several loopholes to avoid paying inheritance taxes. In 1881 "probate duty" became payable on all personal property bequeathed at death. The wording personal property meant that for the first time not only the house and its estate were taxed but also the contents of the house including jewellery – these were often of greater value than the estate itself. By 1884 estate duty taxed property of any manner bequeathed at death, but even when the Liberal government in 1894 reformed and tidied the complicated system at 8% on properties valued at over one million pounds, they were not punitive to a social class able to live comfortably off inherited wealth far below that sum. Death duties, however, slowly increased and became a serious problem for the country estate throughout the first half of the 20th century, reaching a zenith when assisting in the funding of World War II.

This proved to be the deciding factor for many families when in 1940 death duties were raised from 50% to 65%, and following the cessation of hostilities they were twice raised further between 1946 and 1949. Attempts by some families to avoid paying death duties were both helped and hindered by war. Some estate owners gave their properties to their heirs thereby escaping duties; when subsequently that heir was killed fighting, death duties were not payable because a soldier's or sailor's (and later airman's) estate was not subject to the tax. However, if the heir had died single and intestate, the former owner would become the owner again, and when that owner died, the death taxes would have to be paid.

== Legislation to protect the national heritage ==
=== 1882 and 1900 Ancient Monument and Amendment Acts ===
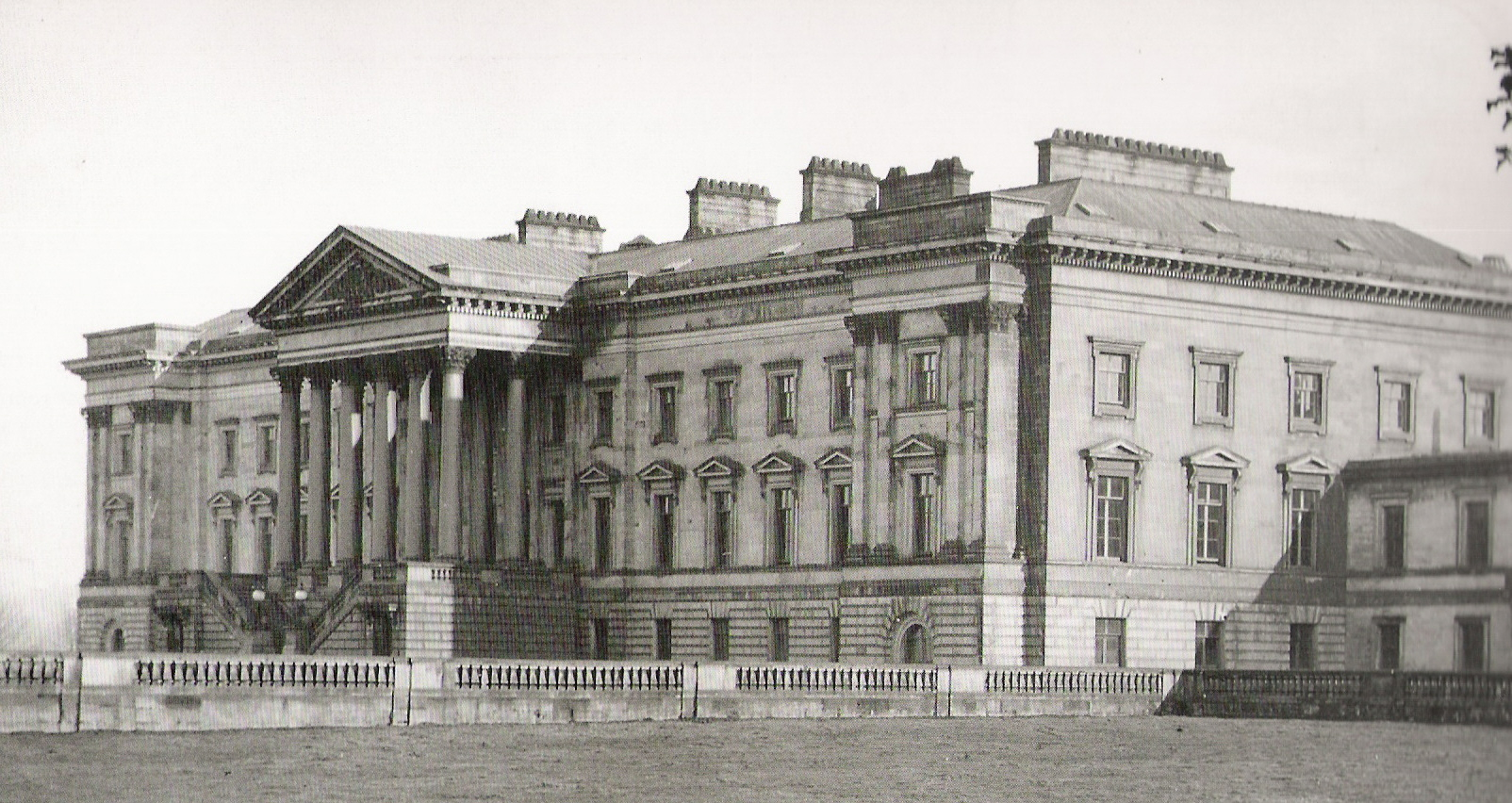
Hamilton Palace, the seat of the Dukes of Hamilton, built in 1695, was subsequently much enlarged. It was demolished in 1921.

The Ancient Monuments Protection Act 1882 was the first serious attempt in Britain to catalogue and preserve ancient British monuments. While the acts failed to protect any country houses, the Ancient Monuments Protection Act 1900 provided one important factor which saved many monuments of national importance by making provision for owners of ancient monuments (on list of the 1882 catalogue) to enter into agreement with civil authorities whereby the property was placed under public guardianship.

While these agreements did not divest the owner of the title to the property, they imposed on the civil authority an obligation to maintain and preserve for the nation. So while the acts may have been in favour of the owner, they set a precedent for the later preservation of structures of national importance. The main problem with the acts was that, out of all Britain's great buildings, they only found 26 monuments in England, 22 in Scotland, eighteen in Ireland and three in Wales worthy of preservation; all of which were prehistoric.

While neolithic monuments were included, the acts specifically excluded inhabited residences. The aristocratic ruling class of Britain inhabiting their homes and castles were certainly not going to be regulated by some lowly civil servants. This view was exemplified in 1911 when the immensely wealthy Duke of Sutherland acting on a whim wished to dispose of Trentham Hall, a vast Italianate palace in Staffordshire. After failing to offload the house onto a local authority, he decided to demolish it. The small, but vocal, public resistance to this plan caused the Duke of Rutland to write an irate letter to The Times accusing the objectors of "impudence" and going on to say "....fancy my not being allowed to make a necessary alteration to Haddon without first obtaining the leave of some inspector". There was an irony in the Duke of Rutland's words, as this same duke was responsible for resurrecting one of his own country houses, Haddon Hall, from ruin. Thus, despite money being no problem for its owner, Trentham Hall was obliterated from its park, which the duke retained and then opened to the public. Thus it was that country houses were left unprotected by any compulsory legislation.

Blytheswood House, Renfrew, Scotland, a neoclassical mansion designed by James Gillespie Graham, was the seat of the Lords Blythswood, and was demolished in 1935.

The Ancient Monuments Consolidation and Amendment Act 1913 was the first act which had the aim of deliberately preserving ancient monuments built since prehistoric times. The act clearly defined a monument as "Any structure or erection other than one in ecclesiastical use." Furthermore, the act compelled the owner of any monument on the list to notify the newly formed Ancient Monuments Board of any proposed alterations, including demolition. The board then had the authority, if minded, to recommend that Parliament place a preservation order on a building, regardless of the owner's wishes, and thus protect it.

Like its predecessors, the 1913 act deliberately omitted inclusion of inhabited buildings, whether they were castles or palaces. The catalyst for the 1913 act had been the threat to Tattershall Castle, Lincolnshire. An American millionaire wished to purchase the uninhabited castle, and ship it to the US in its entirety. To frustrate the proposal, the castle had been purchased and restored by Lord Curzon and thus the export of Lord Cromwell's castle was prevented. The 1913 act was an important step in highlighting the risk to the nation's many historic buildings. The act also went further than its predecessors by decreeing that the public should have access to the monuments preserved at its expense.

While the catalogue of buildings worthy of preservation was to expand, it remained restrictive, and failed to prevent many of the early demolitions, including, in 1925, the export to the US of the near ruinous Agecroft Hall. This fine half-timbered example of Tudor domestic architecture, was shipped, complete with its timbers, wattle and daub, across the Atlantic. In 1929 Priory House, Warwick was also bought, disassembled and shipped across the Atlantic.

The Ancient Monuments Consolidation and Amendment Act 1913 was amended by the Ancient Monuments Act 1931 to restrict development in an area surrounding an ancient monument. The scope of buildings included was also widened to include "any building, structure or other work, above or below the surface". However, the act still excluded inhabited buildings. Had it included them, much that was destroyed before World War II could have been saved.

=== Town and Country Planning Act 1932 ===
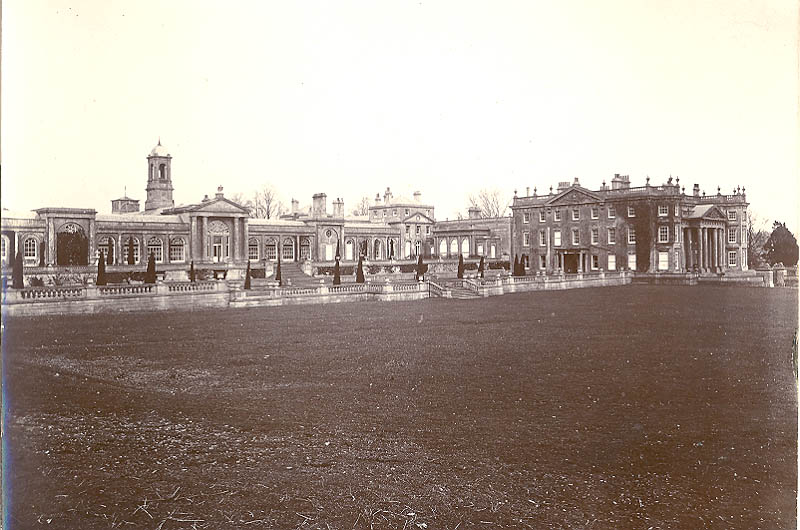
No preservation society or historical group raised an objection to the demolition of Robert Adam's Bowood House in Wiltshire, and the demolition went ahead unchallenged in 1956. Only the orangery wings – to the left of the photograph – remain, and they are today Grade I listed.

The Town and Country Planning Act 1932 was chiefly concerned with development and new planning regulations. However, amongst the small print was clause 17, which permitted a town council to prevent the demolition of any property within its jurisdiction. This unpopular clause clearly intruded on the "Englishman's home is his castle" philosophy, and provoked similar aristocratic fury to that seen in 1911. The Marquess of Hartington thundered:

"Clause 17 is an abominably bad clause, these buildings have been preserved to us not by Acts of Parliament, but by the loving care of generations of free Englishmen who...did not know what a District Council was".

The marquess, so against enforced preservation, was in fact a member of the Royal Commission of Ancient and Historical Monuments, in the House of Lords, the very body which oversaw the implementation of the acts intended to enforce preservation.

Thus, when the act was finally passed after approval from the House of Lords, the final paragraph excluded from the act "any building included in a list of monuments published by the Commissioners of Works" and more tellingly did not "affect any powers of the Commissioners of Works." Ironically, eighteen years later, on the untimely death of the marquess, by then Duke of Devonshire, his son was forced to surrender to the state, in lieu of death duties, one of England's most historic country houses, Hardwick Hall, now owned by the National Trust. The Devonshires' London house Devonshire House had been demolished in 1920, and its site redeveloped.

=== Town and Country Planning Act 1944 ===
The Town and Country Planning Act 1944, with the end of World War II in sight, was chiefly concerned with the redevelopment of bomb sites, but contained one crucial clause which concerned historic buildings: it charged local authorities to draw up a list of all buildings of architectural importance in their area, and, most significantly, for the first time the catalogue was to include inhabited private residences. This legislation created the foundations for what are today known as listed buildings. Under the scheme, an interesting or historic building was graded according to its value to the national heritage:

- Grade I (buildings of exceptional interest)
- Grade II* (buildings of more than special interest)
- Grade II (buildings of special interest, warranting every effort to preserve them)

The act criminalised unauthorised alterations, or demolitions, to a listed building, so in theory at least, all historic buildings were now safe from unauthorised demolition. The truth was that the act was rarely enforced, only a few buildings were listed, over half of them by just one council, Winchelsea. Elsewhere, the fines levied on those failing to comply with the act were far less than the profit from redeveloping a site. Little changed. In 1946, in what has been described as "an act of sheer class-war vindictiveness", Britain's Labour government insisted on the destruction, by open cast mining, of the park and formal gardens of Wentworth Woodhouse, Britain's largest country house. The Minister of Fuel and Power, Manny Shinwell, insisted, as 300-year-old oaks were uprooted, that "the park be mined right up to the mansion's door." Meanwhile, plans by the socialist government to wrest the house from its owner, the Earl Fitzwilliam, and convert the architecturally important house for "homeless industrial families" were only abandoned at the eleventh hour when Earl Fitzwilliam, through the auspices of his socialist sister, agreed to its conversion to a college—a lesser fate. This was the political climate in which many families abandoned the houses their families had owned for generations.

=== Town and Country Planning Act 1947 ===
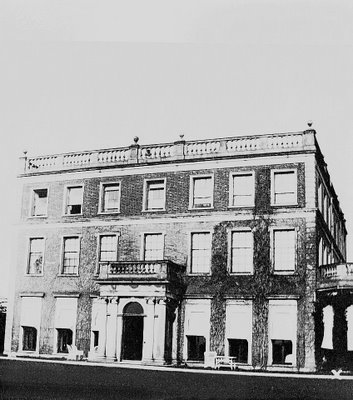
Belvoir House, Newtownbreda, Belfast, the former seat of the Viscounts Dungannon and latterly the Barons Deramore, was demolished in 1961 by the Northern Ireland Forest Service.

The apathy towards the nation's heritage continued after the passing of the Town and Country Planning Act 1947, even though this was the most comprehensive law pertaining to planning legislation in England. The 1947 act went further than its predecessors in dealing with historic buildings, as it required owners of property to notify their local authority of intended alterations, and more significantly, demolitions. This caught any property which may have escaped official notice previously. Theoretically, it gave the local authority the opportunity to impose a preservation order on the property and prevent demolition. Under this law the Duke of Bedford was fined for demolishing half of Woburn Abbey without notification, although it is inconceivable that the duke would have been able to demolish half of the huge house (much of it visible from a public highway) without attracting public attention until the demolition was complete.

Indifference on the part of local authorities and the public resulted in poor enforcement of the Act, and revealed the true root of the problem. When in 1956 Lord Lansdowne notified the "Ministry of Housing and Government" of his intention to demolish the greater part and corps de logis of Bowood designed by Robert Adam, no preservation society or historical group raised an objection (with the exception of James Lees-Milne, the noted biographer and historian of the English country house) and the demolition went ahead unchallenged. The mid-1950s, which should have been regulated by the above acts, was the era in which most houses were legitimately destroyed, at an estimated rate of one every five days.

=== Town and Country Planning Act 1968 ===
The demolition finally began to noticeably slow following the passing of the Town and Country Planning Act 1968. This act compelled owners to seek and wait for permission to demolish a building, rather than merely notify the local authority. It also gave the local authority powers to immediately protect the building by issuing a "Building Preservation Notice", which in effect gave the structure listed building status. Thus it was that 1968 became the last year that demolition ran into double figures.

The final and perhaps most important factor which secured Britain's heritage was a change in public opinion. This was in part brought about by the Destruction of the Country House exhibition held at London's Victoria and Albert Museum in 1974. The response to this highly publicised exhibition was very positive; for the first time the public, rather than a few intellectual bodies, became aware that country houses were an important part of the national heritage and worthy of preservation. Today, over 370,000 buildings are listed, which includes all buildings erected before 1700 and most constructed before 1840. After that date a building has to be of architectural or historical importance to be protected.

== Re-evaluation of the country house ==
The public are admitted, around 1905, for a rare glimpse of the gardens at Brympton d'Evercy. During the 20th century, the house survived its owner's impoverishment and was in turn a private house, a school, an open "stately home", once again a private house, and is today a wedding venue.

The unprecedented demolitions of the 20th century did not result in the complete demise of the country house, but rather in a consolidation of those that were most favoured by their owners. Many were the subject of comprehensive alteration and rearrangement of the interior, to facilitate a new way of life less dependent on vast numbers of servants. Large service wings, often 19th-century additions, were frequently demolished, as at Sandringham House, or allowed to crumble, as was the case at West Wycombe Park.

From around 1900, interior woodwork, including complete panelled rooms and staircases and fittings such as chimneypieces, secured an avid market among rich Americans. In rare cases, complete houses were disassembled, stone by stone, and reassembled in the US; an example is Agecroft Hall, a Lancashire house sold at auction in 1925, dismantled, crated and shipped across the Atlantic, and then reassembled in Richmond, Virginia. The Carolean staircase from Cassiobury Park has come to rest in the Metropolitan Museum of Art in New York, as have elements to reassemble period rooms, including the rococo stuccoed plasterwork from the dining room of the Dashwood seat, Kirtlington Park; the tapestry room from Croome Court; and the dining room by Robert Adam from Lansdowne House, London, where the incidence of lost great residences is higher, naturally enough, than anywhere in the countryside.

== Stately home tourism ==
Many of Britain's greatest houses have frequently been open to the paying public. Well-heeled visitors could knock on the front door and a senior servant would give a guided tour for a small remuneration. In the early 19th century, Jane Austen describes such a trip in Pride and Prejudice, where Elizabeth Bennet and her aunt and uncle are shown around Mr Darcy's Pemberley by the housekeeper. Later in the century, on days when Belvoir Castle was open to the public, the 7th Duke of Rutland was reported by his granddaughter, the socialite Lady Diana, to assume a "look of pleasure and welcome." Here and elsewhere, however, that welcome did not extend to a tea room and certainly not to chimpanzees swinging through the shrubbery; that was all to come over 50 years later. At this time, admittance was granted in patrician fashion with all proceeds usually donated to a local charity.

In 1898, the National Trust for Places of Historic Interest or Natural Beauty (the National Trust) was founded as a charitable society principally for the preservation of landscapes of outstanding beauty or interest. During its infancy its focus gradually changed to include historic buildings. This was due in part to the millionaire philanthropist, Ernest Cook. A man dedicated to preservation of country houses, he had purchased Montacute House in 1931, one of England's most important Elizabethan mansions, which had been offered for sale with a "scrap value of £5,882". Cook presented the house to the Society for the Protection of Ancient Buildings, which promptly passed it to the National Trust. It was one of the trust's first great houses, and over the next 70 years was to be followed by over three hundred further nationally important houses which the Trust would administer and open to the public.

Save Britain's Heritage's campaign to save Mentmore Towers in 1974 was unsuccessful. The priceless contents were sold and are now dispersed over the world, and the house was sold and allowed to decay. Today, four decades after it ceased to be a private house, it lies empty, "officially at risk" and facing an uncertain future.

Following World War II, many owners of vast houses faced a dilemma; often they had already disposed of minor country residences to preserve the principal seat, and now that seat too was in jeopardy. Many considered passing their houses to the National Trust and subsequently received a visit from the Trust's representative, the diarist James Lees-Milne. He often had to choose between accepting a house and saving it, or declining it and sentencing it to dereliction and demolition. In his published memoirs he writes of the confusion many owners felt in what had become a world they no longer understood. Some were grateful to the Trust, some resented it, and others were openly hostile.

To some owners, the principal house was more than just a dwelling; built when the family was at the height of its power, wealth and glory, it represented the family's history and status. The family seat was an integral part of the family's being and needed to be preserved and retained by the family, even if this meant "entering trade", a prospect which would have been unthinkable just a few years earlier. This turn of events had not been anticipated; Evelyn Waugh in his introduction to the 1959 second edition of Brideshead Revisited explained he had not anticipated that Brideshead would in fact have been absorbed by the heritage industry; like the owners of many demolished 'stately homes' Waugh had assumed that such houses were doomed:

It was impossible to foresee, in the spring of 1944, the present cult of the English country house. It seemed then that the ancestral seats which were our chief national artistic achievement were doomed to decay and spoilation like the monasteries in the sixteenth century. So I piled it on rather, with passionate sincerity. Brideshead today would be open to trippers, its treasures rearranged by expert hands and the fabric better maintained than it was by Lord Marchmain.

This can be exemplified by the business ventures executed by the Marquess of Bath at Longleat House. Reacquiring occupation of this enormous 16th-century mansion, in a state of poor repair, following requisition during World War II, the marquess was faced with death duties of £700,000. The marquess opened the house to the paying public and kept the proceeds himself to fund the mansion. In 1966, to keep attendance numbers high, the peer went a step further and introduced lions to the park, thus creating Britain's' first safari park. After the initial opening of Longleat, the Dukes of Marlborough, Devonshire and Bedford opened Blenheim Palace, Chatsworth House and what remained of Woburn Abbey. With the example and precedent of "trade" set by those at the top of the aristocratic pyramid, within a few years hundreds of Britain's country houses were open two or three days a week to a public eager to see the rooms which a few years earlier their ancestors had cleaned. Others, such as Knebworth House, became venues for pop and rock festivals. By 1992, 600 "stately homes" were visited annually by 50 million members of the paying public. Stately homes were now big business, but opening a few rooms and novelties in the park alone was not going to fund the houses beyond the final decades of the twentieth century. Even during the stately home boom years of the 1960s and 1970s historic houses were still having their contents sold, being demolished or, if permission to demolish was not forthcoming, being left to dereliction and ruin.

By the early 1970s the demolition of great country houses began to slow. However, while the disappearance of the houses eased, the dispersal of the contents of many of these near redundant museums of social history did not, a fact highlighted in the early 1970s by the dispersal sale of Mentmore Towers. The high profile campaign of Marcus Binney, eminent architectural historian and president of Save Britain's Heritage, failed to save the mid-Victorian mansion; and the subsequent departure from Britain of many important works of art from Mentmore caused public opinion to slowly change. The house had, in fact, been offered to the nation by its owners in lieu of death duties, but the Labour Government of James Callaghan with a general election in sight did not wish to be seen saving the ancestral home of an hereditary nobleman, and thus rejected the offer. However, that same year the destruction finally came to a near standstill. This was due not just to stricter application of legislation, but also in part due to the aforementioned high-profile Destruction of the Country House exhibition held in 1974 by the Victoria and Albert Museum. However, the damage to the nation's heritage had been done.

== The future ==
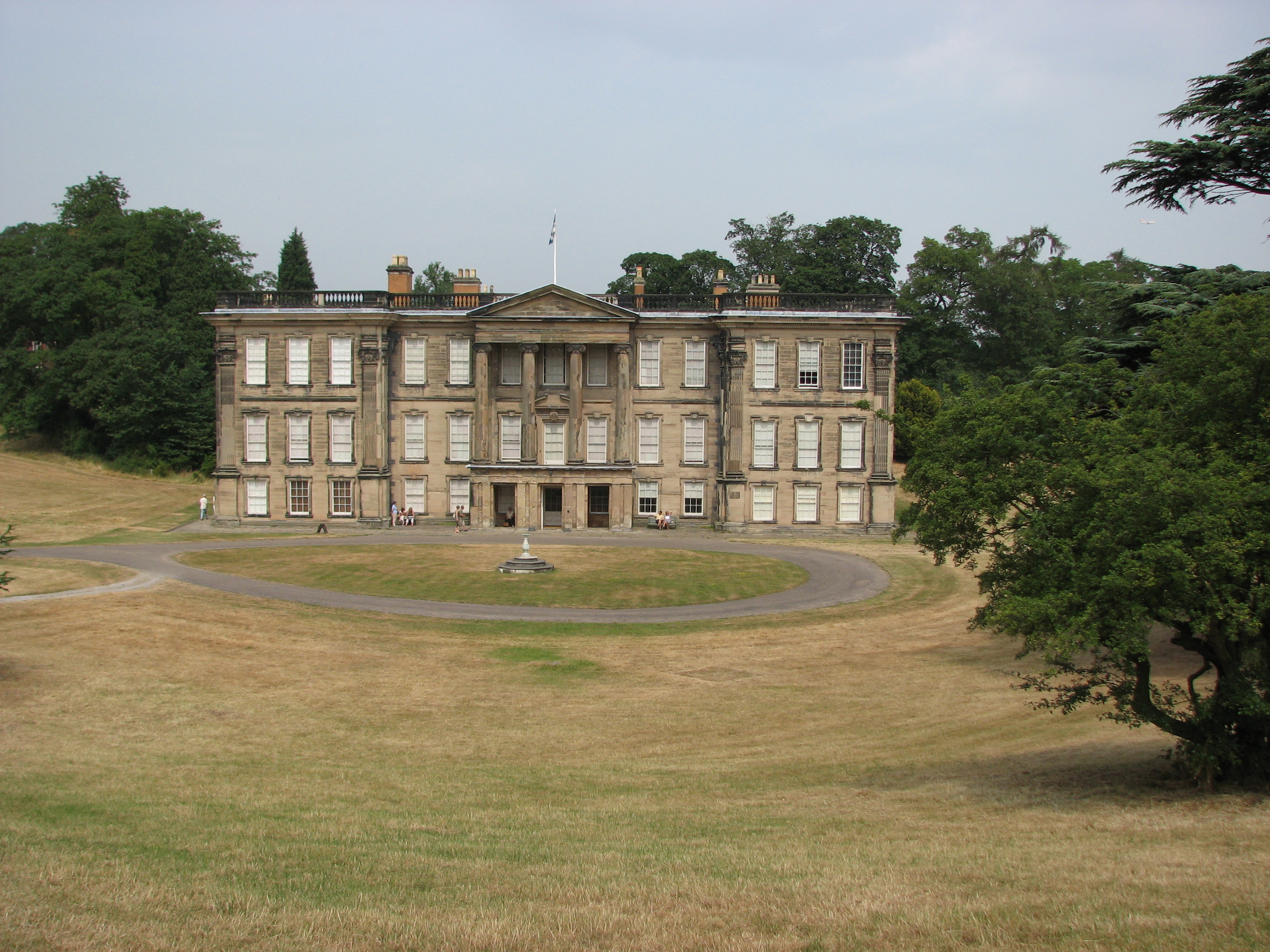
Following a campaign in the early 1980s, Calke Abbey in Derbyshire was saved as a result of increased public awareness and interest in Britain's heritage. It now belongs to the National Trust.

By 1984, public and Government opinion had so changed that a campaign to save the semi-derelict Calke Abbey in Derbyshire was successful. Writing in 1992 in The Daily Telegraph, 47 years after his father wrote his melancholy novel prophesying the decline of country house life, Auberon Waugh felt confident enough of the survival of the country house as a domestic residence to declare: "I would be surprised if there is any greater happiness than that provided by a game of croquet played on an English lawn through a summer's afternoon, after a good luncheon and with the prospect of a good dinner ahead. There are not that many things which the English do better than anyone else. It is encouraging to think we are still holding on to a few of them."

Waugh was writing of the survival of Brympton d'Evercy in Somerset, which in the preceding 50 years had been transformed from an ancestral home and hub of an estate, into a school. Then, following a brief period while its owners tried to save it as a stately home open to the public, it had been sold and purchased for use as a private residence once again, albeit also doubling as a wedding venue and sometimes a film set; both common and lucrative sources of country house income in the 21st century. The 21st century has also seen many country houses transformed into places of seemingly antiquated luxury, in order to meet the demand for a new British institution, the country house hotel. This has been the fate of Luton Hoo in Bedfordshire and Hartwell House in Buckinghamshire. Others remain private houses, but with the principal rooms being hired out as film sets and venues for events and weddings.

Occasionally, country houses have been saved for purely public appreciation as a result of public appeals and campaigns, such as Tyntesfield, a Victorian Gothic Revival mansion in North Somerset, which was saved as an entirety with its contents in 2002. In 2007, after a prolonged and controversial appeal, Dumfries House, an important Scottish country house complete with its original Chippendale furnishings, was saved for the nation following direct intervention and funding from the Duke of Rothesay (later Charles III); its contents had already been catalogued by Sotheby's for auction. The controversy and debate concerning the salvation echoed the debates of the early 20th century about the worth to the national heritage. Today, the British country house is safe from demolition, but its worth is still subject to debate and re-evaluation. British country house contents auctions still happen.

== See also ==
- Category:British country houses destroyed in the 20th century
- Destruction of Irish country houses (1919–1923)
- Country house conversion to apartments
- Destruction of the Country House exhibition

== Bibliography ==
- Bailey, Catherine (2007). Black Diamonds. Penguin. ISBN 978-0-670-91542-2.
- Binney, Marcus (2006). Lost Houses of Scotland. Save Britain's Heritage. ISBN 0-905978-05-6.
- Clay, Catrine (2006). King, Kaiser, Tsar. London: John Murray. ISBN 0-7195-6536-7.
- Devonshire, Deborah, Duchess of (2002). Chatsworth. Derbyshire Countryside Ltd. ISBN 0-85100-118-1.
- Devonshire, Deborah, Duchess of (2010). Wait For me. London: John Murray. ISBN 978-1-84854-190-0.
- "Listed Buildings". English Heritage. Archived from the original on 26 January 2013.
- Gow, Ian (2006). Scotland's Lost Houses. Trafalgar Square. ISBN 1-84513-051-0.
- Jeffery, Robert (2007). Discovering Tong, Its History, Myths and Curiosities. Privately Published. ISBN 978-0-9555089-0-5.
- Kerrigan, S P; Hill, M A (1948). The Town and Country Planning Act, 1947. London: Butterworth & Co.
- King, David (2001). The Complete Works of Robert and James Adam. Architectural Press. ISBN 0-7506-4468-0.
- Lees-Milne, James (2009). Some Country Houses and Their Owners. Penguin Books. ISBN 978-0-14-119090-7.
- Moore, Victor (2005). A Practical Approach to Planning Law (9th ed.). Oxford: Oxford University Press. ISBN 0-19-927279-4.
- Mulvagh, Jane (2006). Madresfield, The Real Brideshead. London: Doubleday. ISBN 978-0-385-60772-8.
- Mynors, Charles (2006). Listed Buildings, Conservation Areas and Monuments. London: Sweet & Maxwell. ISBN 0-421-75830-9.
- "The National Archives; Series reference IR 26".
- "RCAHMS: Exploring Scotland's Places". Royal Commission on the Ancient and Historical Monuments of Scotland. Archived from the original on 4 December 2008.
- Rogers, Malcolm (1991). Montacute House. The National Trust. ISBN 0-7078-0138-9.
- Stuart, Amanda Mackenzie (2005). Consuelo and Alva Vanderbilt: The Story of a Daughter and Mother in the Gilded Age. Harper Perennial. ISBN 978-0-06-093825-3.
- Vickers, Hugo (1 July 1992). Obituary of the Marquess of Bath. London.
- Waugh, Evelyn (1973) [1945]. Brideshead Revisited. Boston: Little, Brown and Company. ISBN 978-0-316-92634-8.
- Worsley, Giles (2002). England's lost Houses. London: Aurum Press. ISBN 1-85410-820-4.
