= Thomas Marjoribanks =

Scottish minister and religious author

Thomas Marjoribanks (1871–1947) was a Scottish minister of the Church of Scotland and religious author who served as minister of the parish of Colinton, Edinburgh, Scotland and also served the role as Chief of Clan Marjoribanks.

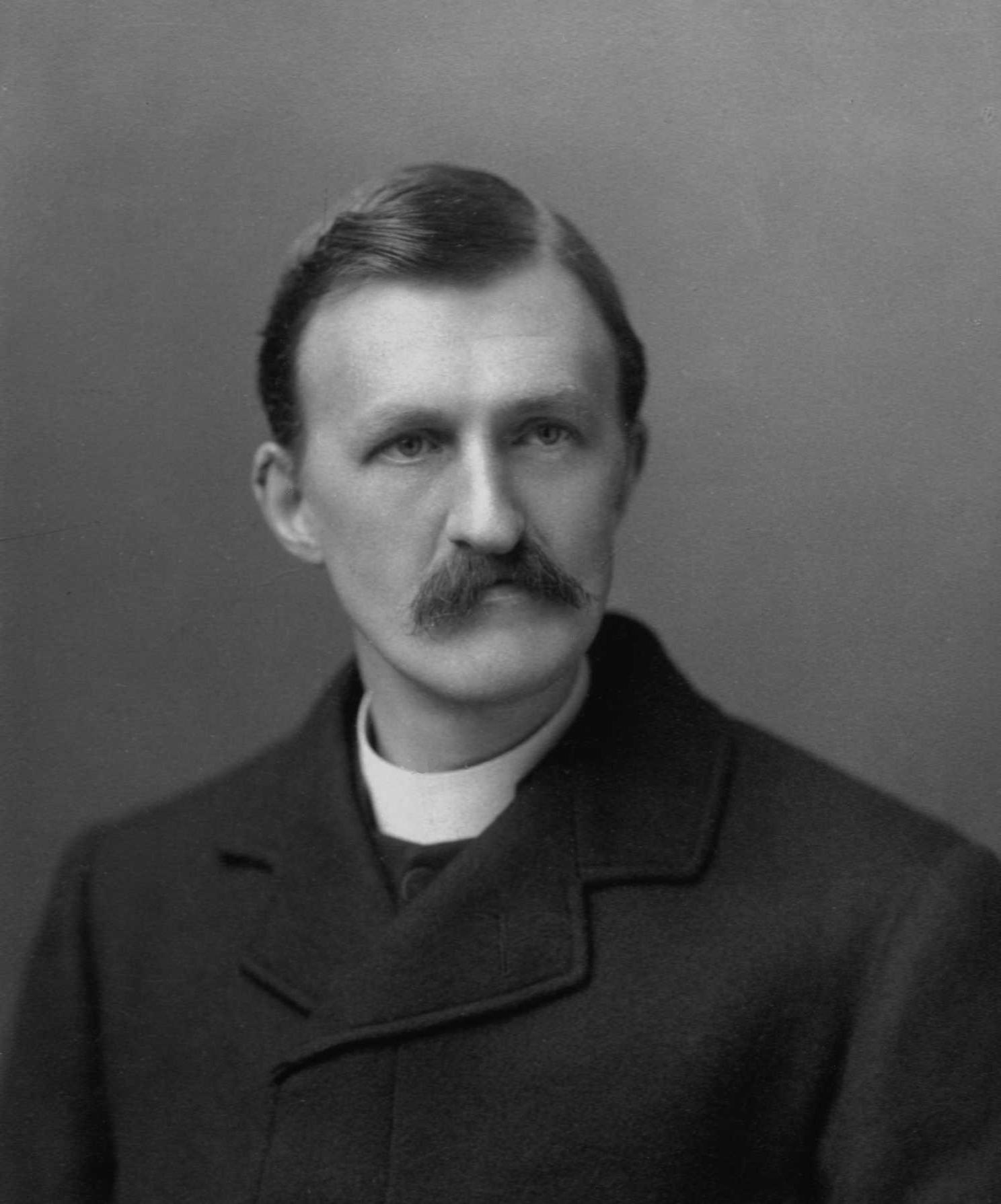
Marjoribanks

== Life ==
He was born on 3 April 1871 the son of George Marjoribanks of Stenton in East Lothian (1842–1821), and his wife, Elizabeth Leslie (1841–1918). He was educated at Stenton Collegiate College then went to Edinburgh University where he graduated MA in 1891 and BD in 1894. His paternal grandfather was Rev Thomas Marjoribanks (1809–1868) also minister of Stenton. He was a descendent of the family of Sir John Leslie, mathematician and physicist.

Thomas (1809–1868), his son Alexander (1840–1923) and his grandson Thomas (1871–1947), were successively Chief of Clan Marjoribanks.

He was licensed to preach by the Presbytery of Dunbar in May 1894. His first role was as assistant in West Parish Aberdeen then went to Edinburgh as assistant to Andrew Wallace Williamson at St Cuthbert's church. In December 1898 he was ordained as minister of Houndwood church, Berwickshire before being translated to Callander in February 1903.

In November 1910 he moved to the affluent Edinburgh suburb of Colinton as minister of Colinton Parish Church. He lived there in Colinton manse, a tranquil corner next to the Water of Leith. After he left Colinton Parish in 1930 or 1932 he moved to Morham Parish church, East Lothian, where he was minister for eight years before retiring in 1941.

He died in St Andrews in Fife on 30 January 1947 aged 71.

== Family ==
In January 1907 he married Mary Ord Logan (d 1946) daughter of William Logan of the Madras Civil Service. They had children: George Marjoribanks (1908–1955) later the Reverend George Marjoribanks; William Logan Marjoribanks (1910–1991); James Alexander Milne Marjoribanks (1911–2002) later Sir James Marjoribanks; and Anne Leslie Marjoribanks (1916–2008).

== Publications ==
- Studies in the Life of Our Lord on Earth (1908)
- In The Likeness of Men (1909)
- The Fulness of the Godhead: Further Studies in the Life of Our Lord (1910)
- The Sevenfold I am (1913)

He was editor of the church magazine "In Far Fields" for many years.
