= Destruction of the Country House exhibition =

Coordinates: 51.496302°N 0.172078°W

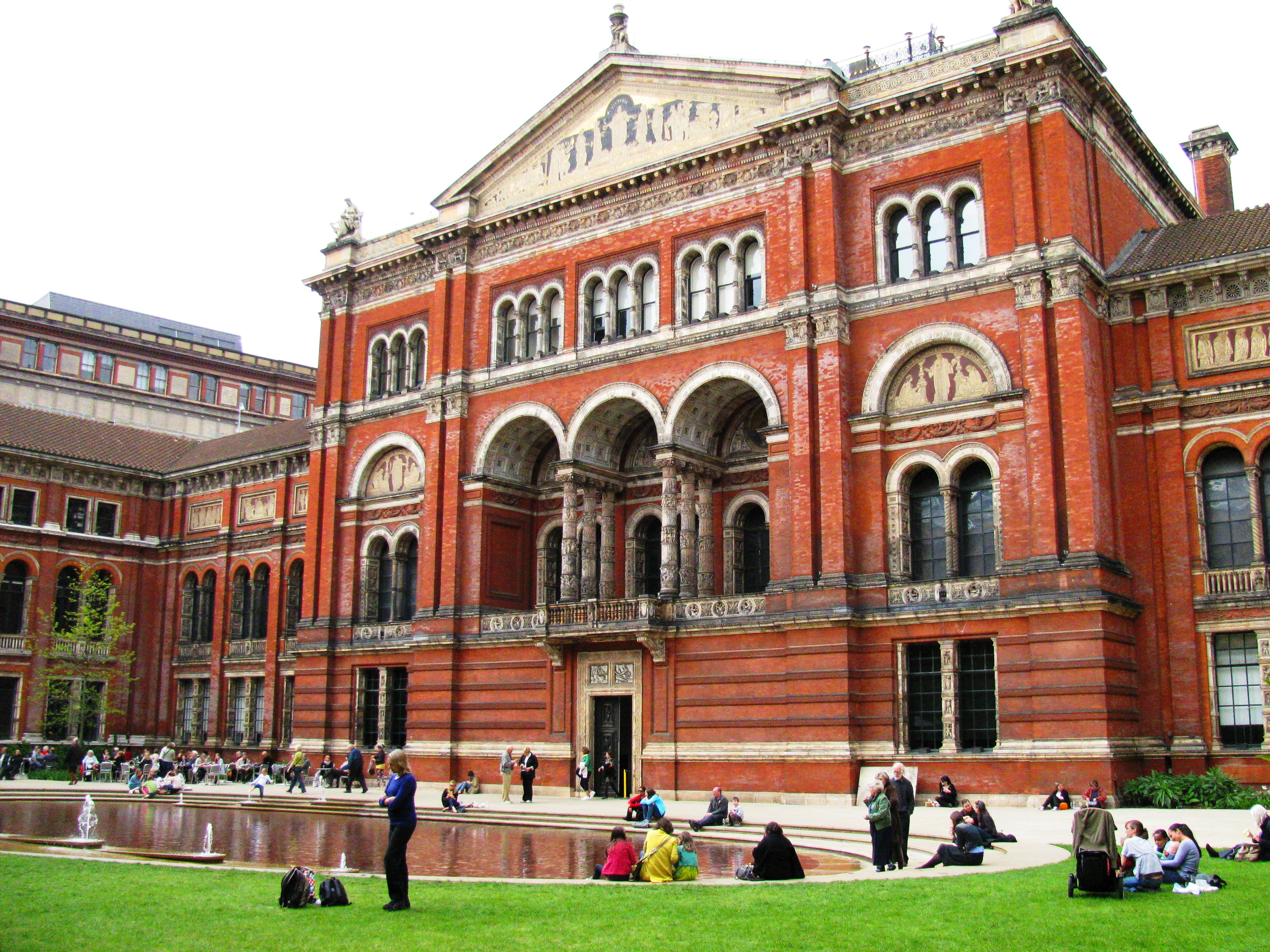
The Victoria and Albert Museum in 2010

The Destruction of the Country House 1875–1975 was an exhibition held at the Victoria and Albert Museum (V&A) in 1974, commissioned by V&A Director Roy Strong and curated by John Harris, Marcus Binney and Peter Thornton (then working, respectively, at the Royal Institute of British Architects (RIBA), Country Life magazine and the V&A Department of Furniture and Woodwork).

The exhibition included a "Hall of Destruction", decorated with falling columns and illustrations of some of the thousand country houses demolished since 1875, brought down by falling estate incomes, rising costs, death duties, and damage caused by government requisitioning during the Second World War.

Described as a "landmark" exhibition, the graphic illustration of the scale of destruction of Britain's built heritage changed public opinion and encouraged moves to protect the country houses that remained.

The success of the exhibition inspired the formation of the campaigning group Save Britain's Heritage in 1975 – a year that was designated as European Architectural Heritage Year by the Council of Europe - but the changed public mood could not prevent the sale of the extraordinary collection of art and furniture at Mentmore Towers in 1975, and of the empty building itself in 1977, to pay taxes following the death of Harry Primrose, 6th Earl of Rosebery in 1973.

The exhibition was followed in 1977 and 1979 by two further exhibitions at the V&A on British architectural heritage: Change and Decay: The Future of our Churches (curated by Strong, Binney and Peter Burman), and then The Garden: A Celebration of a Thousand Years of British Gardening (organised by Harris).

== See also ==
- Destruction of country houses in 20th-century Britain
