= Balbardie House =

Country house, demolished in 1975, in West Lothian, Scotland

Coordinates: 55.90767°N 3.6413°W

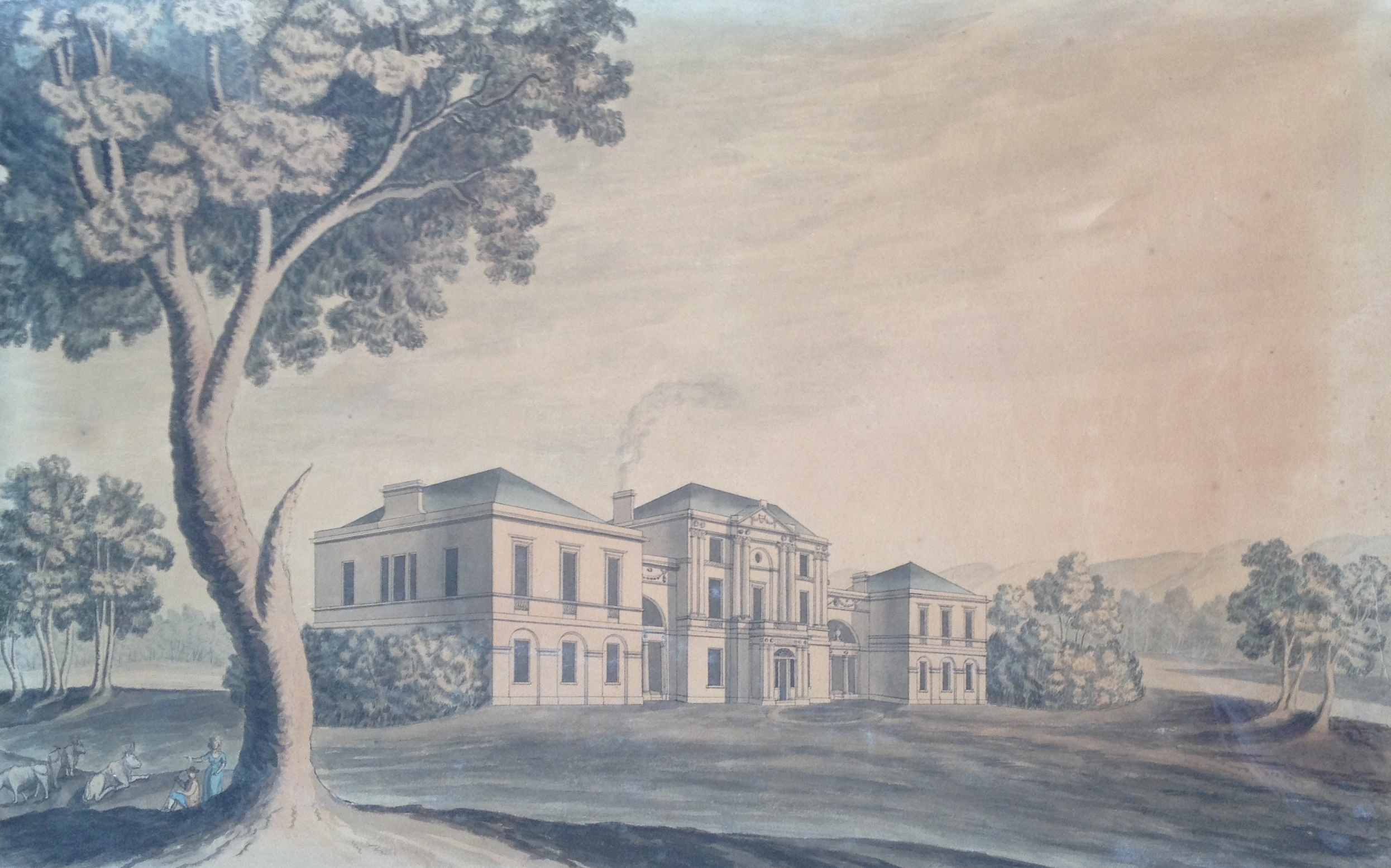
- Balbardie house painting in water colour by Robert Adam. This painting accompanied the original drawings of Balbardie house
- Interactive map of the Balbardie House area

General information
- Architectural style: Neoclassical
- Location: West Lothian, Scotland
- Year built: 1792
- Demolished: 1954 and 1975

Design and construction
- Architect: Robert Adam

Balbardie House was an 18th-century Scottish mansion house in West Lothian, Scotland, near to the town of Bathgate.

== History ==
The house stood on the site of an earlier Balbardie House, dating from at least 1691, which had seven principal rooms. These were incorporated into the 18th-century design and were the cause of the odd link blocks to the wings.

The 18th-century house was designed by Robert Adam, and has been described as his best classical house in Scotland, the grand manner in miniature. This great neoclassical mansion was demolished in two stages in 1954 and in 1975.

The seat of the Marjoribanks family, since 1624 when John Marjoribanks bought the estate, the house was constructed at the end of the 18th century by Alexander Marjoribanks and situated within a park of 100 acres (0.40 km^{2}). One of Adam's final designs, the plans are signed and dated 1792 shortly before his death on 3 March 1792.

The house was typical of his neoclassical style, with a central corps de logis, flanking wings and end pavilions. The corps de logis had similarities with another of Adam's great houses, Kedleston Hall, except that at Balbardie Adam used a single small pediment at the centre rather than fully suggesting the Arch of Constantine as he did at Kedleston.

Another common Adam feature which is highly defined but in an unusual setting at Balbardie are the recessed apses behind screening columns in the low wings connecting the three bayed pavilions to the corps de logis. This was a feature Adam often used internally but seldom externally. That Adam was not present during the final stages of drawing and completion of the house is evident by the prominence of the chimneys at Kedleston and elsewhere so carefully disguised; the pitch of the roofs suggests a northern Baroque such as the Nymphenburg (where the chimneys are equally visible). However, these features are part of the character of the house and should not be seen as detracting from its architectural importance. The house faced South West over gardens which included an ornamental lake, plantations and a belvedere (a summer house with a fine view).

In 1833 Bathgate Academy was built on land called Rules Acre, a part of the Balbardie estate which had been given to the Academy by Alexander Marjoribanks.

In 1861 the property was purchased by Daniel Stewart's College, not for their own use, but to provide an income stream from rents on its land and from its mineral rights.

The house was subject of an illustrated essay by Thomas P. Marwick in the journal "Architectural Review" in October 1920, recognising the threat of Bathgate's growth to the house, and the nearby chemical works at Addiewell. The house also stood over rich coal seams, and already viewed onto one huge mountain of coal waste, known in Scotland as a "bing". Several internal walls had slumped due to coal mining under the house.

== Demolition ==
The glory of Balbardie as one of Scotland's grandest private houses was to be short-lived - barely sixty years. In 1830 Alexander Marjoribanks died and his estate passed on to his son also called Alexander Marjoribanks. The latter travelled widely and sold Balbardie House to the Edinburgh Merchant Company, trustees of Daniel Stewart's College in 1861.

Coal mining began to encroach on the grounds and the house was converted into apartments for miners.

A survey was done by Colin McWilliam on behalf of the Scottish National Building Record in 1953. The house with the exception of one of the pavilions was demolished from 1954 to 1956; the remaining pavilion was demolished in 1975, but some ruins remained for another decade.

The author Ian Gow described the demolition thus: "the dilapidation and staged demolition of Balbardie.....due to a lack of funding, diminished the heritage of the work of one of Scotland's most celebrated architects, Robert Adam".

Following the demolition of 1975, the land was cleared and landscaped and converted into the Balbardie Park of Peace and Sports Centre which includes the Bathgate Leisure Centre and a golf course.
