= Vera Stanley Alder =

English painter

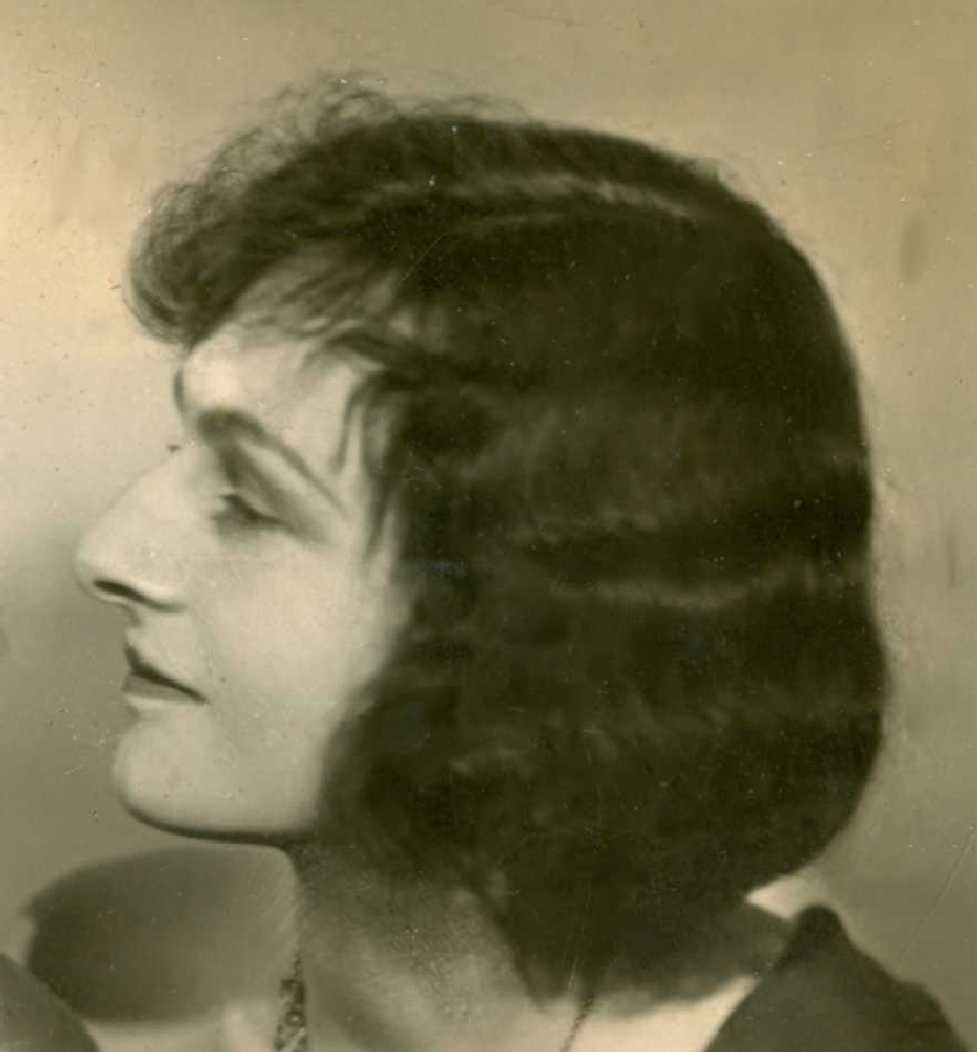
- Born: 29 October 1898; Eglingham, Northumberland, England
- Died: 26 May 1984 (aged 85); Bournemouth, Dorset, England
- Education: Roedean School, Sussex
- Occupations: portrait painter, Writer, Mystic
- Spouse(s): Roland Thomas Hunt (1943-1956); Aage Henry Wirenfreldt Larsen (1963-1989)
- Relatives: Sir James Marjoribanks; Niels Bohr
- Writing career
- Language: English

Signature
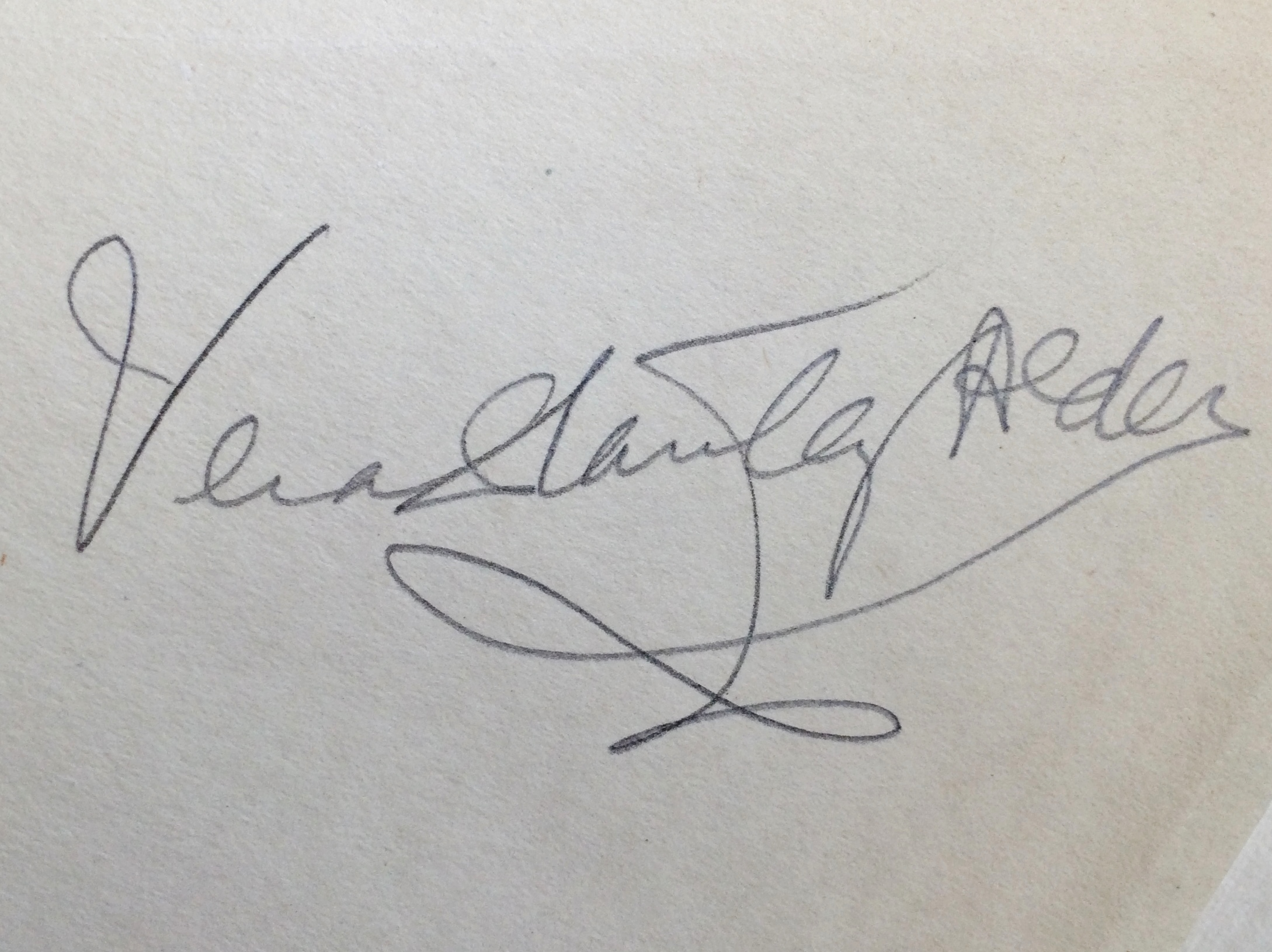

Vera Dorothea Stanley Alder (29 October 1898 – 26 May 1984) was an English portrait painter and mystic. She wrote several books and pamphlets on self-help and spirituality. She founded the World Guardian Fellowship.

== Background and family life ==
Vera Dorothea Stanley Alder was born 29 October 1898 at Eglingham, near Alnwick, Northumberland. Her father David Julius Alder (born 3 April 1871) was Danish and her mother Sylvia Marie Stanley (born 12 December 1880) was English. Her first sister Karen, who later became a leading actress was born on 11 August 1901. Her second sister Sonya Patricia who married Sir James Marjoribanks was born on 20 May 1910. Vera was a fourth cousin of Niels Bohr, the Nobel Prize winner and atomic physicist. Vera was educated at Roedean School in Sussex until 1914 and went to the Slade School of Art in London in 1917 to study portrait painting. She also studied painting in Paris.

Vera first married Roland T. Hunt, a naval architect, on 12 June 1943 with whom she shared a common enthusiasm for esoteric subjects. They divorced on 23 May 1956. Roland later emigrated to California where he died. He was the co-founder of the Amica Temple of Radiance.

On 16 February 1963 Vera married Aage Larsen, her Danish publisher; the marriage lasted until her death on 26 May 1984, in Bournemouth, where Vera was cremated on Wednesday 6 June the local paper noting that she had a 'wide-ranging and exuberant interest in spiritual life'. In the early 1970s, she resided for a time at Acacia House, London, and likely presented lectures there.

== Career and works ==
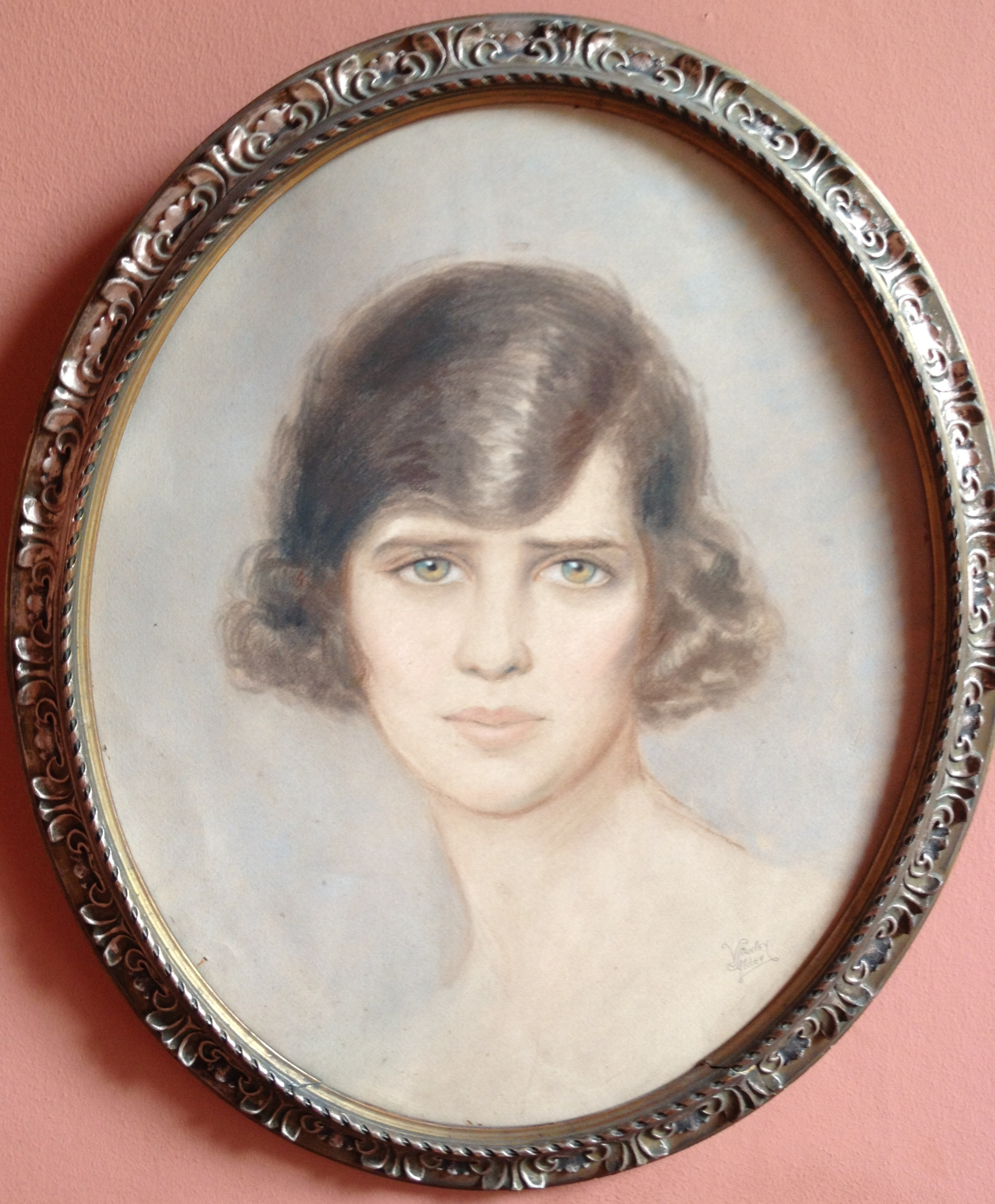
Elizabeth Countess of Toering-Jettenbach, pastel painting by Vera Stanley-Alder

Vera had a successful career as a portrait painter using both oil paints and pastels. In 1923, for example, she exhibited portraits of Lady Douglas, Lady Poynter, and Princess Tatiana Wiazemsky (granddaughter of Harry Gordon Selfridge) at the Lyceum club in Paris where she had a studio. In 1926 she exhibited portraits of Lady Beaverbrook and others in London, and in 1927 she exhibited at the Cercle Nautique in Cannes portraits of Princess Elizabeth of Greece and Denmark, Baron de Saint-Marc and the actor and cricketer Aubrey Smith. She wrote seven books, one of which (From the Mundane to the Magnificent) she described as a "spiritual autobiography." Her books have been translated into several languages. Alder was a vegan and the editor of The Vegan Society's magazine The Vegan from 1951 to 1953.

Her devotees include such widely divergent people as Elvis Presley, progressive rock musicians and hippies. The singer and songwriter Jon Anderson said he got inspiration for his music from his third eye based on Vera Stanley Alder's book The Finding of the Third Eye. The author and spiritual teacher Judy Zebra "J. Z." Knight was accused by her bodyguard of using ideas found in Vera Stanley Alder's book From the Mundane to the Magnificent (mixing quantum physics with New Age ideas). One commentator described Stanley Alder as "A painter and mystic who was particularly successful in finding a way to join both technological and social progress with a mystic spirituality." Stanley Alder founded the World Union Fellowship, which later became the World Guardian Fellowship that published the Journal of World Guardians and which continued, after her death.

== Works ==
- Stanley Alder, Vera (1938). The Finding of the Third Eye Rider (imprint) and Company, London, UK ISBN 0-09-027343-5
- Stanley Alder, Vera (1939). The Initiation of the World Rider (imprint) and Company, London, UK ISBN 0-09-089700-5
- Stanley Alder, Vera (1940). The Fifth Dimension Rider (imprint) and Company, London, UK ISBN 0-09-027292-7
- Stanley Alder, Vera (1942). Wisdom in Practice Rider (imprint) and Company, London, UK ISBN 0-09-103810-3
- Stanley Alder, Vera (1950). Humanity Comes of Age Andrew Dakers Ltd. (Later republished as When Humanity Comes of Age Rider (imprint) and Company, London, UK ISBN 0-09-111801-8)
- Stanley Alder, Vera (1958). The Secret of the Atomic Age Rider (imprint) and Company, London, UK ISBN 0-09-111811-5
- Stanley Alder, Vera (1979). From the Mundane to the Magnificent Rider (imprint) and Company, London, UK ISBN 0-09-138071-5

[All the above were reissued in paperback from 1968 on by Samuel Weiser, 734 Broadway, New York 10003, USA]

- Stanley Alder, Vera, The Story of World Union Fellowship (Pamphlet) The World Union Fellowship Publishing Company and Photospeed Lithographic Company, London, UK
- Stanley Alder, Vera (1976). The Time is Now! A Guide to World Regeneration (Pamphlet) World Guardian Publishing Co. and Comet Press Ltd., Bedford, UK
- Stanley Alder, Vera, The New World Civilization (Pamphlet) C.W. Daniel & Co, Ashingdon. UK
- Stanley Alder, Vera, Self Training in the Art of Living 12 talks on cassettes The Speakers International Agency, 29 Old Bond Street, London W1X 4LJ, UK, with titles:
