= Clan Marjoribanks =

Scottish clan

- Crest: A demi-griffin Proper, issuant from a crest coronet Or
- Motto: ET CUSTOS ET PUGNAX

Profile
- Region: Lowlands
- District: Renfrewshire

Chief
- Andrew George Marjoribanks of that Ilk
- Chief of the Name and Arms of Marjoribanks
- Historic seat: Balbardie House
Clan branches
Lees, Leuchie, Ratho, Tweedmouth

Clan Marjoribanks is a Scottish clan of the Scottish Lowlands.

== History ==
=== Origins ===
The story often told of the origins of the surname Marjoribanks, and even supported by respectable authorities, is that Marjorie, daughter of King Robert the Bruce, brought into her marriage with Walter Stewart in 1315 lands in Dumfriesshire which became known as "Marjorie's Banks"; unfortunately no such lands formed part of Marjorie's dowry. An alternative explanation is that lands in the area of Ratho (which undoubtedly were Marjorie's) were granted to an early Marjoribanks in the 16th century; this is true enough, but the surname had already been current for at least 50 years.

This attractive myth was almost certainly invented by a junior branch of the Marjoribankses (represented now by Marjoribanks of Lees) in the 17th century to bolster their claim to gentility. The reality is perhaps more mysterious. The first known Marjoribanks, Philip "de Merioribankis de eodem", i.e. "Marjoribanks of that Ilk", appears in 1485 as the holder of the "five merklands of Merioribankis of ancient extent." He was probably a Johnstone who distinguished himself from the many other Johnstones of the area by adopting this patronymic. There have been many explanations of the origin of this place name (it is now Marchbank Farm in the parish of Kirkpatrick-Juxta near Moffat, Dumfriesshire); it may even have been adopted as a token of respect to Marjorie, since the Bruces at one time owned land in the area. But this is a problem which may never be convincingly solved.

The name is usually pronounced 'Marchbanks', and Alexander Nisbet asserts that the family who acquired the lands of the princess and took her name were originally kin to the Johnston Lords of Annandale. He finds evidence for this in the family's coat of arms, which incorporates a gold cushion and a star. The Clan Johnstone's coat of arms bears three gold cushions, and in heraldry a star often alludes to a spur-rowel, which is part of Lord of Annandale's crest (heraldry).

=== 16th century ===
The Marjoribanks came to prominence in the early sixteenth century, when the Court of Session, the civil section of the Supreme Court of Scotland, was reinstituted in its modern form by King James V of Scotland in 1532. Thomas Marjoribanks of that Ilk, son of Philip Marjoribanks, was one of ten advocates appointed as procurators, or pleaders, before the Lords of the Court of Session. Four centuries before the introduction of legal aid the Scottish Courts recognised the need for the poor to be represented by able lawyers, and in March 1535, Thomas was appointed advocate 'for the puir' with a salary of £10 Scots per annum. He willingly accepted the post, but waived his right to the salary. His public-spirited nature was rewarded when he became Lord Provost of Edinburgh in 1540, representing the city in the Parliament of Scotland of that year, and again in 1546. He had acquired land at Ratho near Edinburgh by a charter of 1539 which enabled him, ten years later, to assume the title, 'Lord Ratho', on his appointment as a judge. He became the Lord Clerk Register and acquired more land at Spotts and in Annandale, Dumfries and Galloway.

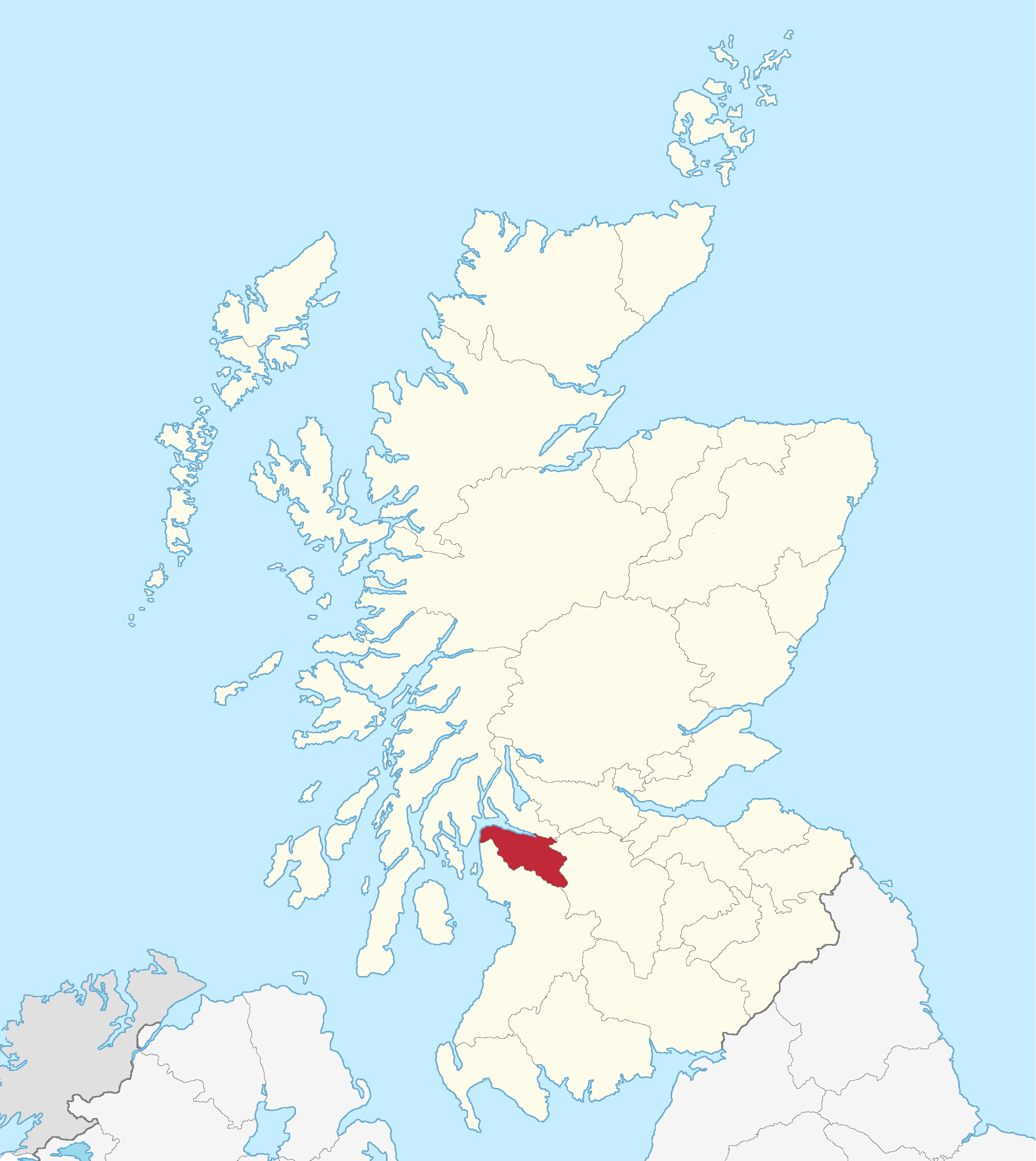
Map of Scotland showing the county of Renfrewshire, where the Marjoribanks lived

=== 17th to 18th century ===
After Lord Ratho died, the chiefship devolved on his grandson, Thomas, who sold Ratho in 1614 to James Duncan. The family acquired lands at Balbardie around 1624. Christian Marjoribanks, Ratho's great-grandniece, married George Heriot, goldsmith and financier to King James VI of Scotland, founder of the famous Edinburgh school George Heriot's School which still bears his name. Heriot was so wealthy that he reputedly kept his purse filled with gold, and to the citizens of Edinburgh he was known as 'Jinglin' Geordie'.

Andrew Marjoribanks of Balbardie and of that Ilk was another distinguished lawyer who was appointed Writer to the King in 1716. He acted as agent for James Sandilands, 7th Lord Torphichen and was commissary of Edinburgh, an important post in the administration of estates of the deceased.

=== 19th to 21st century ===
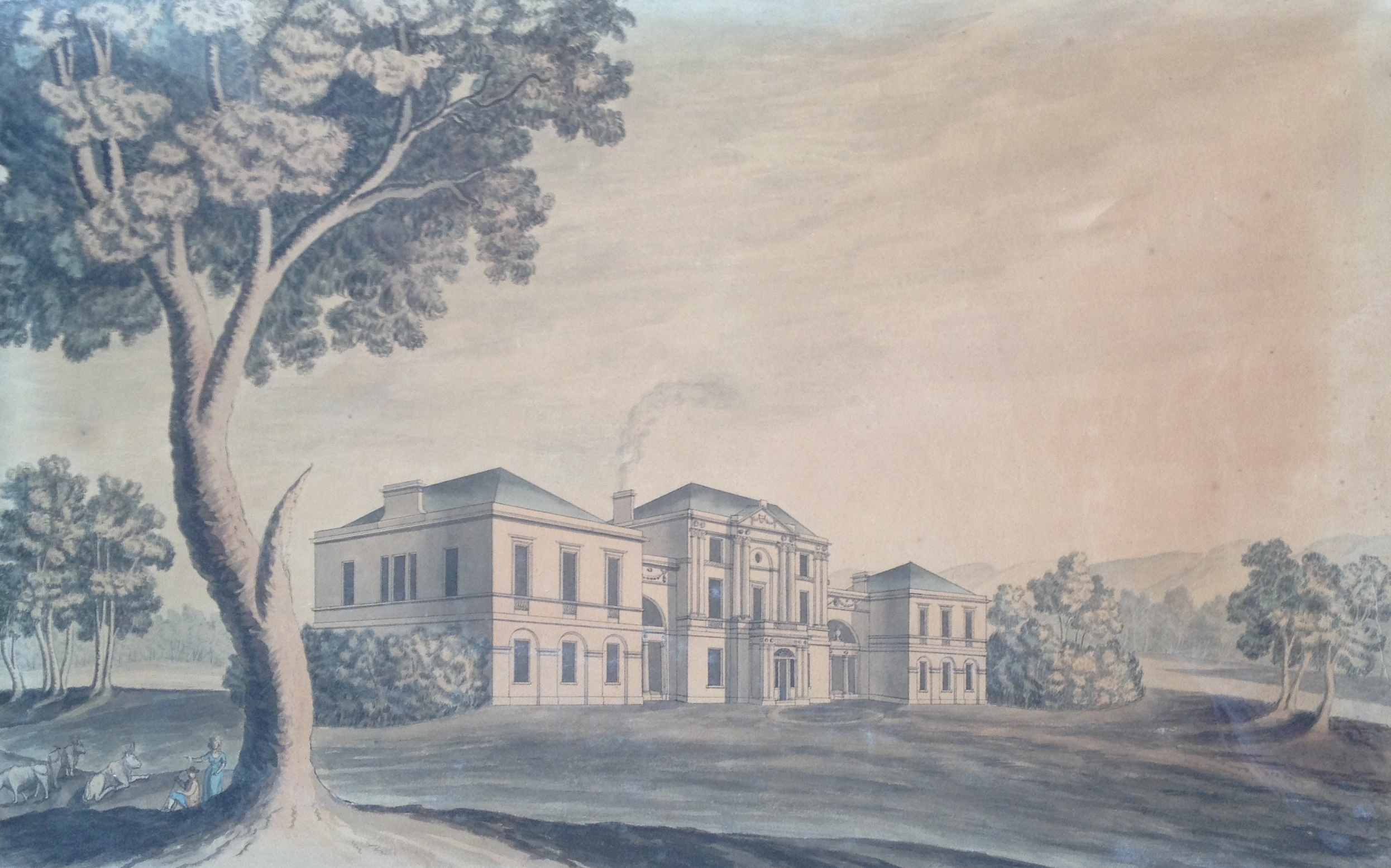
Balbardie house

Andrew Marjoribanks grandson, Alexander, brought the family full circle when he acquired the Barony of Bathgate, which had also formed part of Princess Marjorie's dowry. He was convenor of Linlithgowshire (now called West Lothian) for over thirty years, and in 1824 voluntarily surrendered his baronial rights to allow Bathgate to become a burgh, with Alexander as its first Provost. Alexander was ultimately succeeded by his seventh son, the Reverend Thomas Marjoribanks, Minister of Lochmaben and later of Stenton in East Lothian. In 1861 he sold the estates of Balbardie (including Balbardie House) and Bathgate to the trustees of Stewart's Hospital (now part of Stewart's Melville College). His eldest son, Alexander, succeeded in 1869, but although he married twice, he died childless and was succeeded by his brother, the Reverend George Marjoribanks minister of Stenton. George's son the Reverend Thomas Marjoribanks, minister of Colinton was the next chief and his son, another Reverend George Marjoribanks succeeded him in 1947. This George Marjoribanks devoted most of his life to the Moral Re-Armament spiritual movement, died in 1955 without issue in Warm Springs, Georgia and was buried in New York. The next chief, brother of George and father of the present chief, was William Marjoribanks of that Ilk who was an ecologist and worked on major conservation projects for the government of Sudan in Khartoum. William's brother was the diplomat Sir James Marjoribanks who was the Ambassador to the European Economic Community at the time of Britain's negotiations to enter the EEC.

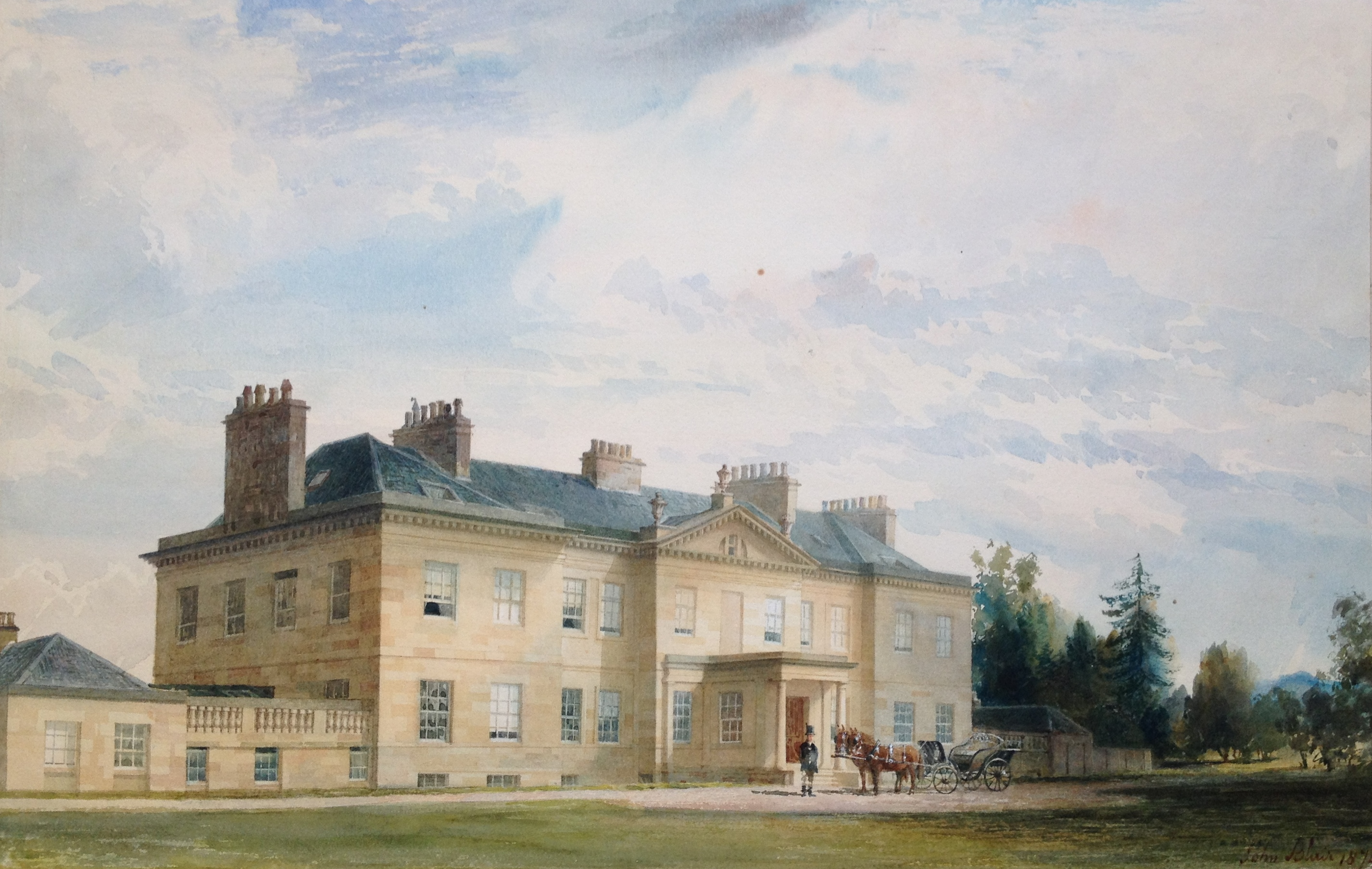
The Lees, Berwickshire about 1869, home of the Marjoribanks of Lees

=== Other branches of the Marjoribanks family ===
A George Marjoribanks (hypothesised to have been the son of George Marjoribanks, a junior member of the family of Marjoribanks of Balbardie and of that Ilk) took part in the Jacobite rising of 1715 and fought with the Jacobite army against the British at the Battle of Preston (1715). He was captured and transported to Virginia in 1716. Many of his descendants now live in the US, in particular, North and South Carolina, where there are regular meetings of the Marjoribanks family.

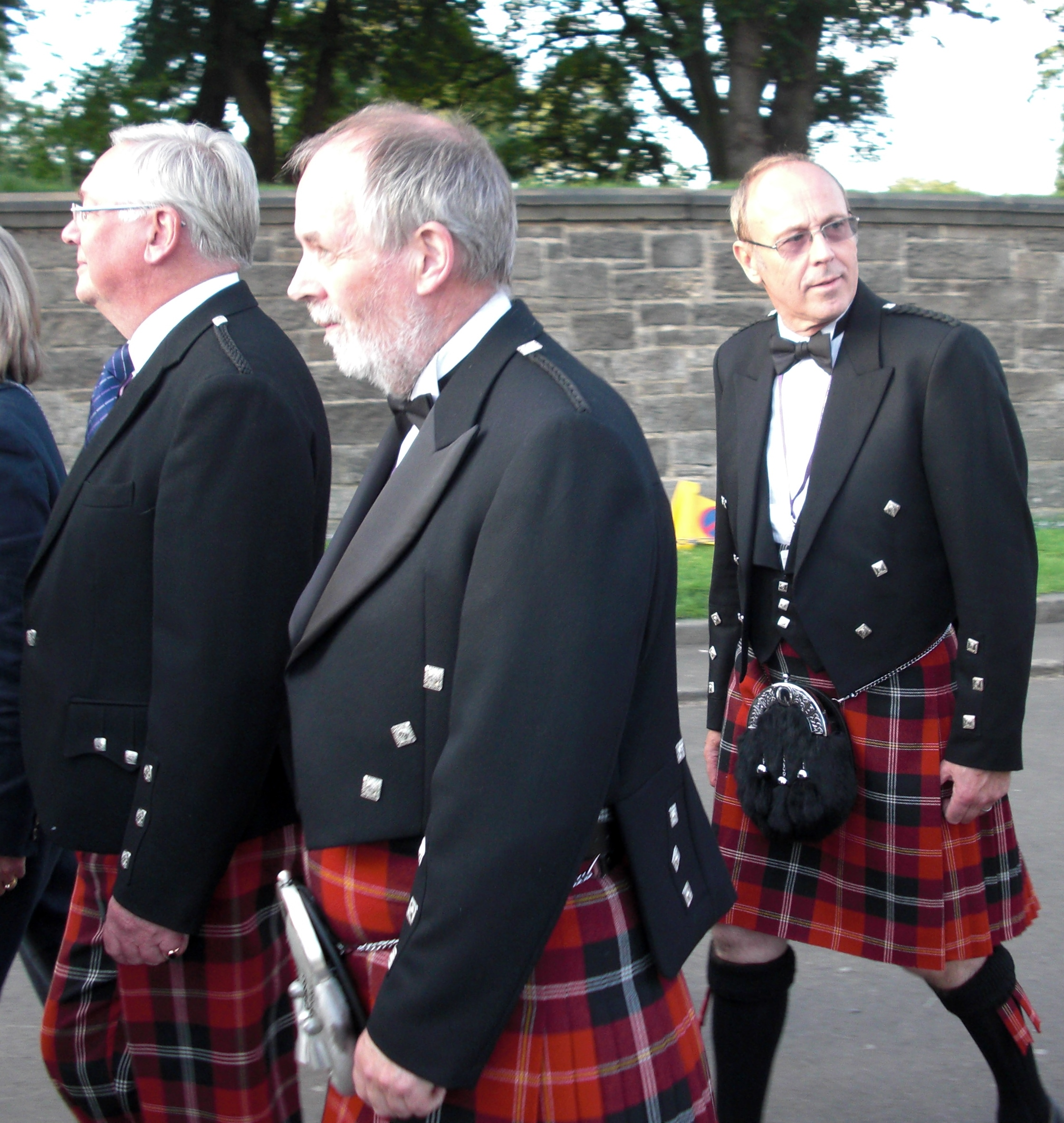
Marjoribanks clan members wearing kilts of the Marjoribanks tartan

A junior line of the Marjoribanks family called Marjoribanks of Lees is descended from James Marjoribanks, a younger son of Thomas Marjoribanks of Ratho and Joseph Marjoribanks, a wine and fish merchant in Edinburgh who died in 1635. Joseph's son John Marjoribanks matriculated the arms of Marjoribanks of Leuchie in 1673. A century later the arms were re-matriculated as Marjoribanks of Lees by Edward Marjoribanks of Lees, a wine merchant. His son, Sir John Marjoribanks, was Lord Provost of Edinburgh and became a baronet, his grandson David, Baron Marjoribanks was elevated to the peerage as was another grandson Dudley Coutts Marjoribanks, 1st Baron Tweedmouth. These titles have since become extinct but there are several descendants of the Marjoribanks of Lees line living in England and the Channel Islands today.

Robert Marjoribanks, an engineer employed by the railways and from Kirkpatrick-Juxta, Dumfriesshire, Scotland married Jessie Walker and died before 1895. His two sons Robert Alexander, and John Walker Marjoribanks emigrated before the First World War to Newcastle, New South Wales, Australia where there are numerous Marjoribanks descendants – including Robert Marjoribanks or "Bob Banks" an Australian international rugby league player.

=== Tartan ===
There is an official tartan for the Marjoribanks family.

== See also ==
- Scottish clan
- Marjoribanks Baronets
