= Amica Temple of Radiance =

Former new religious movement based on chromotherapy

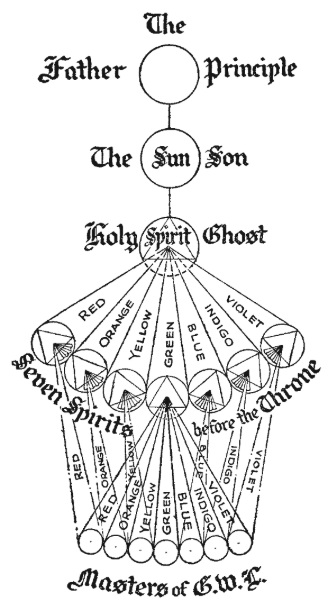
- Roland T. Hunt's diagram of the Masters and Rays, 1949
- Formation: 1959
- Founder: Roland T. Hunt, Dorothy Bailey
- Type: Occult organization
- Purpose: Chromotherapy
- Headquarters: United States
- Origins: Aquarian Mystical Institute of Colour Awareness
- Region served: United Kingdom

The Amica Temple of Radiance was an American occult organization based on the chromotherapy teachings of Ivah Bergh Whitten. The organization has been described by scholars as a new religious movement.

== History ==
Theosophist Ivah Bergh Whitten founded the Aquarian Mystical Institute of Colour Awareness (AMICA) in the early 1920s, and the organization was renamed the Aquarian Master Institute of Colour Awareness in 1939. In the 1920s, Whitten lectured on the occult properties of color and combined the teachings of Dinshah P. Ghadiali with Theosophy. She authored her first booklet, What Color Means to You, in 1932. Whitten taught that white light passes from the highest realm of spiritual hierarchy known as the Great White Brotherhood and eventually splits into the seven rays of the spectrum. Each color is said to relate to an aspect of human life and is assigned to an ascended master.

Whitten developed associations between the seven colors and chakras and is credited with pioneering the practice of color breathing. This imaginative meditation technique involves a person picturing their breath with a specific color and then breathing it into their body. She passed the organization to British occultist Roland Thomas Hunt, who became a main exponent of chromotherapy in the mid 20th-century. (Note: Roland T. Hunt was married to occultist Vera Stanley Alder.)

Hunt authored a number of works on chromotherapy, such as Fragrant and Radiant Healing Symphony in 1937, which combined aromatherapy with color healing. He also authored The Finding of Rainbow's End in 1939 and The Seven Keys to Colour Healing in 1940. The latter work has been described as the "first modern comprehensive textbook which integrated material on the subject from both physics and psychology". After World War II, Hunt moved to California, where he managed the organization from their headquarters.

After Whitten had died in 1947, Hunt and Dorothy Bailey founded the AMICA trust to continue her research. The organization was renamed the Amica Temple of Radiance in 1959. (Note: The Amica Temple of Radiance was also known as the Amica Master Institute of Colour Awareness.) After Hunt's death the organization was managed by Paola Hugh (1898–1979) and in 1971 an affiliate organization, the Fleur de Lys Foundation was founded in Eastsound, Washington.

== Selected publications ==
- Ivah Bergh Whitten (1932). What Colour Means to You. C. W. Daniel.
- Roland Hunt (1937). Fragrant and Radiant Healing Symphony. C. W. Daniel.
- Ivah Bergh Whitten (1948). Colour Breathing: The Breath of Transmutation. C. W. Daniel.
- Rolant Hunt (1940). The Seven Keys to Colour Healing. C. W. Daniel.
