= Jean-Marc Boegner =

French diplomat (1913–2003)

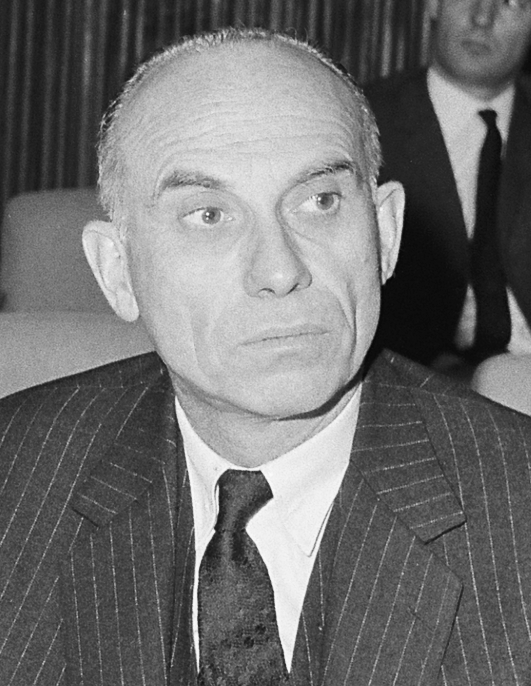
Jean-Marc Boegner in 1967

Jean-Marc Boegner (3 July 1913 – 24 January 2003) was a French diplomat, promoted to the rank of ambassador in 1973.

== Family ==
Jean-Marc Boegner was born in Paris on 3 July 1913, the son of the theologian and pastor Marc Boegner and brother of the newspaper owner Philippe Boegner. With Odilie Moustier, he had three daughters, one of whom married Josselin de Rohan-Chabot.

== Career ==
Jean-Marc Boegner studied at the Faculty of Letters at the Sorbonne and the École libre des sciences politiques and went on to become:

- 1939: Attaché at the French embassy in Germany (Berlin)
- 1940: Attaché at the French embassy in Turkey (Ankara)
- 1941: Attaché at the French embassy in Lebanon (Beirut)
- 1945: Counsellor at the French embassy in Sweden
- 1947: Counsellor at the French embassy in the Netherlands
- 1948: Counsellor at the French Foreign Office
- 1952: Head of Department at the Quai d'Orsay (vice director of treaties)
- 1954: Minister Plenipotentiary
- 1955: Chief of Staff of the Minister at the Presidency of the Council of Ministers Gaston Palewski
- 1958-1959: technical advisor to the President of the Council Charles de Gaulle
- January 1959: Technical Adviser to the General Secretariat of the Presidency of the Republic
- November 1959: French ambassador to Tunisia
- 1961-1972: Permanent Representative of France to the European Communities in Brussels
- 1975-1978: Permanent Representative of France to the OECD
- 1986-1987: Advisor to the Prime Minister Jacques Chirac

== Honours ==
- Commander of the National Order of Merit
- Grand officer of the Legion of Honour

== Works ==
- Le Marché commun de six à neuf (The Common Market from Six to Nine) (1974)
