= David Milne Home (politician) =

British soldier and Conservative politician

Colonel David Milne Home

Member of Parliament for Berwick-upon-Tweed
- In office 1874–1880 Serving with Dudley Marjoribanks
- Preceded by: Viscount Bury; John Stapleton
- Succeeded by: Dudley Marjoribanks; Henry Strutt

Member of Parliament for Berwick-upon-Tweed
- In office 1880–1885 Serving with Dudley Marjoribanks (1880–1881); Hubert Jerningham (1881–1885)
- Preceded by: Dudley Marjoribanks; Henry Strutt
- Succeeded by: Sir Edward Grey, Bt

Personal details
- Born: 25 September 1838 Edinburgh, Scotland
- Died: 19 November 1901 (aged 63) Eyemouth, Berwickshire, Scotland
- Party: Conservative
- Spouse(s): Jane Buchan Hepburn (m. 1867) Mary Pamela Ellis
- Parents: David Milne-Home (father); Jean Margaret Home (mother)
- Relatives: Admiral David Milne (paternal grandfather); John Home Robertson (grandson)
- Education: Cheltenham College; Trinity College, Cambridge; Edinburgh University
- Military career
- Allegiance: United Kingdom
- Branch: British Army
- Service years: 1861–1874; 1882–1896
- Rank: Colonel
- Unit: Royal Horse Guards
- Conflicts: Anglo-Egyptian War

Colonel David Milne Home (25 September 1838 – 19 November 1901) was a British soldier and Conservative politician.

== Career ==
Milne Home was born in Edinburgh, the eldest son of David Milne-Home (thus making him a grandson of Admiral Sir David Milne) and his wife Jean Home, heiress of William Foreman Home. After being educated at Cheltenham College, Trinity College, Cambridge and Edinburgh University, he joined the Royal Horse Guards in 1861.

In politics, Milne Home was elected Member of Parliament (MP) for the English borough constituency of Berwick-upon-Tweed in February 1874. He lost his seat in the 1880 general election, but the election was declared void and he was re-elected at a by-election in July 1880. He retired from parliamentary politics upon his defeat in the Scottish county constituency of Berwickshire in the general election of 1885.

Returning to the army, he served as second in command of the Household Cavalry Regiment in the Anglo-Egyptian War in 1882, and was present in the engagements at El Magfar, Mahamma and Kassassin. He completed his period of command of the Royal Horse Guards in 1887, promoted to the substantive rank of colonel, he was appointed to the 11th Regimental district from 1890 until 1896, when he retired from service with the rank of full colonel.

== Family ==
Milne Home inherited the Home estates from his mother, including Wedderburn Castle and Paxton House, Berwickshire. He married first, in 1867, Jane Buchan Hepburn, second daughter of Sir Thomas Buchan-Hepburn, Bart. After her death, he married Mary Pamela Ellis, daughter of Major Ellis.

Milne Home died 19 November 1901, in the fishing village of Eyemouth, Berwickshire where he had attended a meeting. His eldest son David William Milne Home (1873–1918) was a Captain of the South East Scotland Artillery, and inherited the estates. His grandson John Home Robertson was a Labour MP.

Parliament of the United Kingdom
Preceded by Viscount Bury; John Stapleton	Member of Parliament for Berwick-upon-Tweed; 1874–1880; With: Dudley Marjoribanks	Succeeded by Dudley Marjoribanks; Henry Strutt
Preceded by Dudley Marjoribanks; Henry Strutt	Member of Parliament for Berwick-upon-Tweed; 1880–1885; With: Dudley Marjoribanks (1880–1881); Hubert Jerningham (1881–1885)	Succeeded by Sir Edward Grey, Bt
