= John Martin (MP for Berwick-upon-Tweed) =

16th-century English politician

John Martin (fl. 1529) was an English politician.

== Identity ==
It is unclear who this John Martin was, although there are several mentions of other John Martins which may relate to him. There were Martins involved in governing Berwick-upon-Tweed later in the sixteenth century, who may have been his relations. The first guild book of the town is incomplete between 1509 and 1537, leaving us little information.

Not all Members of Parliament had connections to the area they represented, and it has been speculated that he was the John Martin who was baron of Leconfield, Yorkshire, and served Henry Percy, 5th Earl of Northumberland as Groom of the Chamber in October 1523. This Martin was with the Earl in Newcastle upon Tyne in 1523 and was given an annuity from a North Riding of Yorkshire manor by the Earl. It is also speculated that John Cooper, who he served alongside and who we also have scant information on, may have been associated with the Earl and the Percy family.

There was also a John Martin who served as a member of Cardinal Wolsey's household in the 1520s.

Without being clear on his identity, we have no information on his family, early life or career outside Parliament.

== Career ==
He was a Member (MP) of the Parliament of England for Berwick-upon-Tweed in 1529. It can be speculated that he may have also been returned in 1536, as Henry VIII had asked for the serving Members of Parliament to be re-elected.

Parliament of England
| Preceded by ? ? | Member of Parliament for Berwick-upon-Tweed; 1529; With: John Cooper then John Uvedale | Succeeded by ? ? |
