= Harold Burge Robson =

British soldier, barrister and politician

Hon. Harold Burge Robson (10 March 1888 – 13 October 1964) was a British soldier, barrister and Liberal Party politician.

== Background ==
Robson was born the son of former Liberal Minister Lord Robson. He was educated at Eton and New College, Oxford.

== Professional career ==
Robson was called to the Bar in 1910. He was awarded the Croix de Guerre during World War I.

== Political career ==
Robson was Liberal candidate at the 1923 Berwick-upon-Tweed by-election. This was a Liberal seat which had been won by a supporter of the Coalition Government in 1922. In the by-election, a Unionist won the seat. He was Liberal candidate again for the Berwick-upon-Tweed division at the 1923 General Election, when he came within 2,000 votes of defeating the Unionist. He fought the seat a third time in 1924 without success. He was Liberal candidate for the South Shields division at the 1929 General Election. This was a Liberal seat won previously due to the absence of a Unionist candidate. This time a Unionist intervened and he lost the seat to the Labour Party by just 40 votes. He did not stand for parliament again. He was Vice-Chairman of Northumberland County Council from 1935 to 1937.

=== Electoral record ===
1923 Berwick-upon-Tweed by-election
Party	Candidate	Votes	%	±%
Unionist	Mabel Philipson	12,000	55.0	n/a
Liberal	Harold Burge Robson	5,858	26.8	−11.3
Labour	Gilbert Oliver	3,966	18.2	n/a
Majority		6,142	28.1	+4.3
Turnout		21,824	74.9	+8.7
Unionist gain from National Liberal		Swing	n/a	

General Election 1923: Berwick-upon-Tweed
Party	Candidate	Votes	%	±%
Unionist	Mabel Philipson	10,636	48.0	−7.0
Liberal	Harold Burge Robson	8,767	39.5	+12.7
Labour	Edna Martha Penny	2,784	12.5	−5.7
Majority		1,869	8.5	−19.7
Turnout			73.4	−1.5
Unionist hold		Swing	-9.9	

General Election 1924: Berwick-upon-Tweed
Party	Candidate	Votes	%	±%
Unionist	Mabel Philipson	12,130	50.9	+2.9
Liberal	Harold Burge Robson	8,165	34.3	−5.2
Labour	J. Adams	3,521	14.8	+2.3
Majority		3,965	16.6	+8.1
Turnout			77.7	+4.3
Unionist hold		Swing	+4.0	

General Election 1929: South Shields
Party	Candidate	Votes	%	±%
Labour	James Chuter Ede	18,938	42.2	+0.1
Liberal	Harold Burge Robson	18,898	42.0	−15.9
Unionist	William Nunn	7,110	15.8	n/a
Majority		40	0.2	16.0
Turnout			72.9	−2.4
Labour gain from Liberal		Swing	+8.0	

== Other ==
Robson was a Member of the Committee of Management of the Royal National Life-Boat Institution from 1936 and Vice-President from 1955.

== See also ==
- 1923 Berwick-upon-Tweed by-election
