= Longridge Towers School =

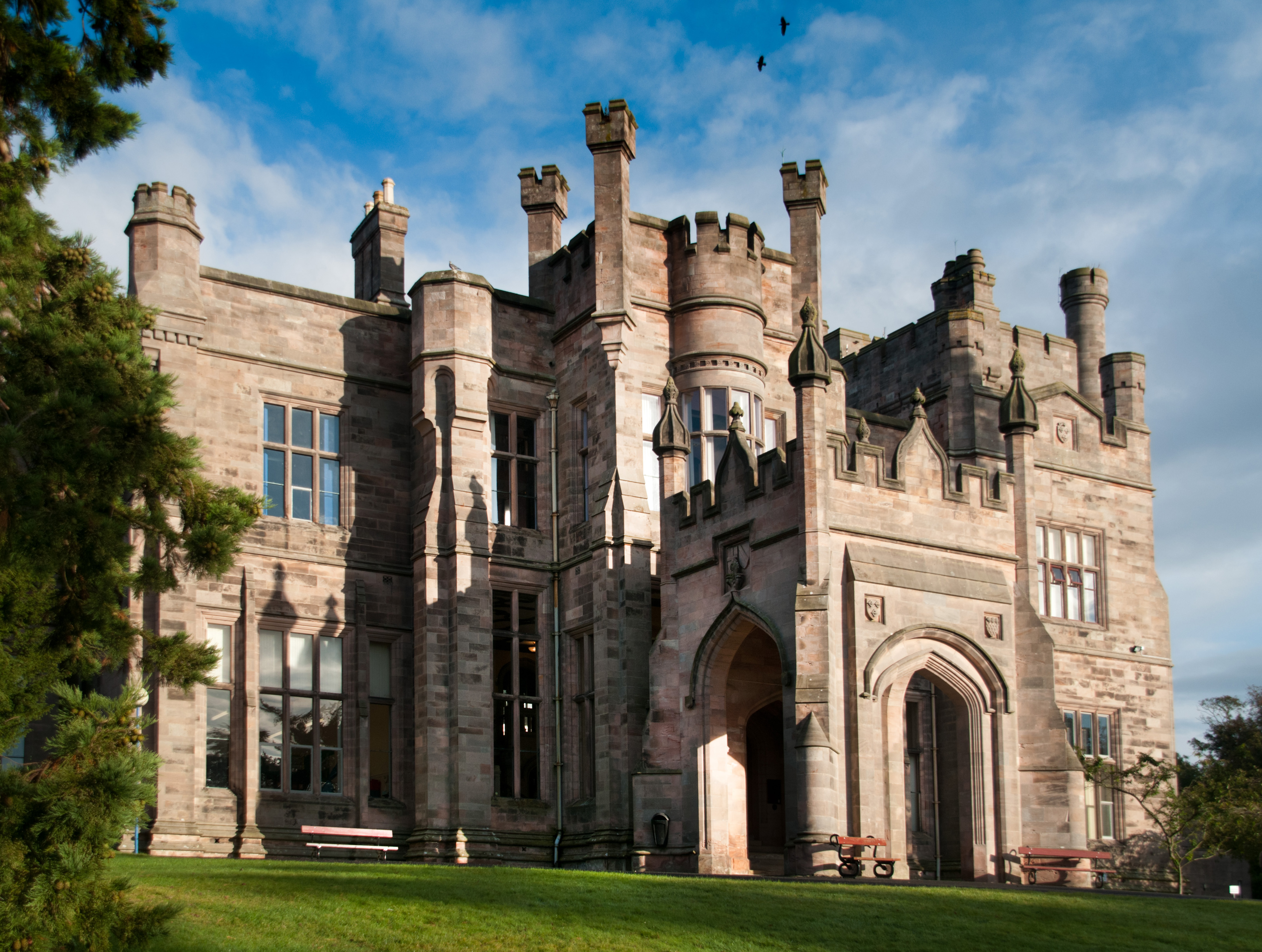

Location
- Berwick-upon-Tweed, Northumberland, TD15 2XQ; England; 55.74304°N 2.06816°W

Information
- Type: Private day and boarding
- Established: 1983
- Local authority: Northumberland
- Department for Education URN: 524369 Tables
- Headteacher: Jon Wilcox
- Gender: Coeducational
- Age: 3 to 19
- Enrolment: 290~
- Houses: 3 (Jerningham, Stobo, Home)
- Website: www.lts.org.uk

Longridge Towers School is a non-selective co-educational private day school with some boarding provision in the parish of Horncliffe (formerly Longridge) near Berwick-upon-Tweed, Northumberland, England, for children between the ages of three and eighteen.

== School history ==
The main house was built during the 1870s and was once a hotel and military barracks. In 1949 it became an Ursuline convent school and remained so until 1983 when the order left Northumberland. It was then sold to a charitable trust and named Longridge Towers School. It now has some two hundred and fifty pupils. Most children are day pupils, with a minority of boarding pupils, including international students.

=== Building history ===
The Longridge estate was acquired, through his marriage, by Hubert Jerningham, who from 1881 to 1885 had been a Liberal Member of Parliament for Berwick-upon-Tweed. He was thereafter colonial secretary of the British Honduras (Belize) (1887–1889), colonial secretary (1889–1893) and lieutenant-governor of Mauritius (1892–1893), and governor of Trinidad and Tobago (1897–1900). The principal building, erected as his stately home, at great cost, incorporated the very latest innovations including a hydraulic lift and gas lighting to all parts of the main house. The portico is said to have been built for a visit of the Prince of Wales to make sure he did not get wet when alighting from his coach. When it was completed it was one of the largest private houses in the north of Northumberland, and Jerningham lived there until his death in 1914. Lady Jerningham (d. 1902) had been Annie, daughter of E. Liddell, of Benton Park, and widow of C. T. Mather of Longridge, and her statue sits on the Elizabethan town walls in Berwick-upon-Tweed looking towards the distant school. The building was afterwards a hotel, until it became a convent school.

== Inspections ==
Boarding provision at the school was inspected by Ofsted in 2009. At that date there were 24 pupils in the boarding accommodation. The provision received a judgement of 'satisfactory'.

The school was inspected by the Independent Schools Inspectorate in 2017. At that time there were 288 day pupils and 30 boarding pupils. Academic and other achievements were judged 'good', and pupils' personal development was judged 'excellent'.

== Notable alumni ==
- Oscar Onley, cyclist.
- Guy Learmonth, runner.
