= 1923 Berwick-upon-Tweed by-election =

UK parliamentary by-election

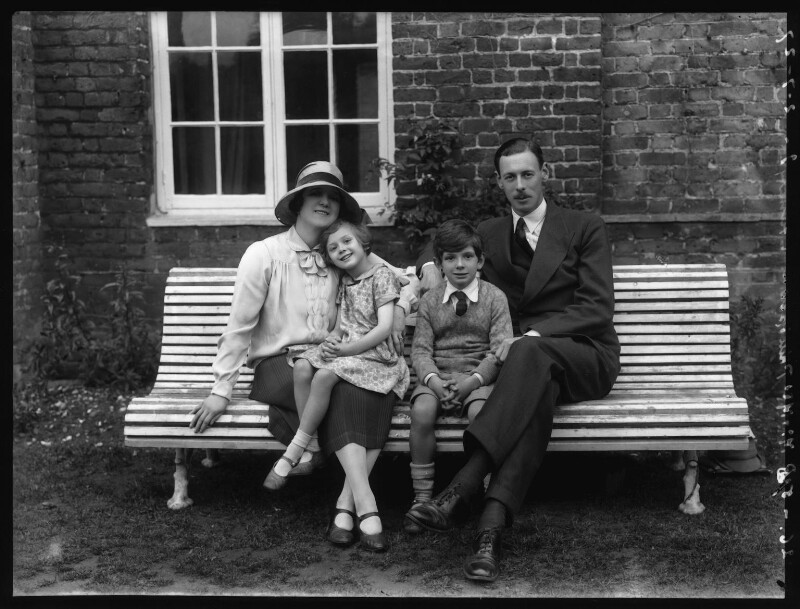
Mabel Philipson, winner of the by-election, alongside her husband Hilton Philipson and their children

The 1923 Berwick-upon-Tweed by-election of 31 May 1923 was a by-election to the British House of Commons which saw Mabel Philipson become the third woman to take her seat in Parliament. The election was caused when her husband, Hilton Philipson, was deprived of his seat due to corruption by his election agent. The result was formally a Conservative Party gain as husband and wife fought as members of different parties. Mrs Philipson, a former actress, performed much better at the polls than her party had expected.

== Previous election ==
At the 1922 general election, the contest in the Berwick-upon-Tweed constituency had attracted some wider attention as the seat was fought between two candidates both representing strands of the same Liberal Party. Former cabinet minister Walter Runciman was the official party nominee, selected at the last minute after the sitting MP stood down, while Hilton Philipson was nominated as a 'National Liberal' supported by David Lloyd George. The local branch of the Conservative Party, while initially hesitant, later "[flung] themselves wholeheartedly into the fight" supporting Philipson.

The result of the election on 15 November 1922 was:

General election 1922: Berwick-upon-Tweed
Party	Candidate	Votes	%	±%
National Liberal	Hilton Philipson	11,933	61.9	N/A
Liberal	Walter Runciman	7,354	38.1	N/A
Majority		4,579	23.8	N/A
Turnout		19,287	66.2	
National Liberal gain from Liberal		Swing		

== Election petition ==
On 6 January 1923, an election petition was lodged challenging the election of Philipson on the grounds of excessive expenditure. The legal maximum spending by any candidate was £850, and Philipson returned spending totalling £985; he was entitled to exclude his personal expenses (amounting to £72) and an allowance of £75 towards his election agent from the legal maximum, which meant that the spending reported by Philipson was £838 and therefore within the legal limit. However, the petitioners (two Independent Liberals, Brigadier-General Widdrington and Professor Bosanquet) alleged that Philipson's election agent had agreed with a local printer to lower the printing bill by £100 below market rate so that the campaign would not exceed the legal maximum.

The petition came to trial in April 1923, with the petitioners stressing that Captain Philipson was not accused of any wrongdoing, and nor was there any accusation of corruption or 'treating'. On 2 May, the three Judges hearing the petition declared the election void, having found that the return of expenses was false. Philipson was given relief against the finding that his election campaign had been corrupt, but his election agent Thomas Boal was reported for corrupt and illegal practices.

== Candidates ==
The law provided that, even if given relief, a candidate who had been elected through corruption was disqualified for seven years in the constituency. Immediately the result was known, it was speculated in Berwick that Mrs Philipson might stand for the seat vacated by her husband; however she insisted that she would only stand as a Conservative. On Saturday 5 May, the Central Council of the Berwick-upon-Tweed Unionist Association unanimously adopted her as their candidate for the forthcoming by-election. Mrs Philipson arrived in Berwick on 9 May to meet members of the Unionist club, telling them that although not brilliant at making a speech, she could fight in a good cause.

Mrs Philipson was formerly Miss Mabel Russell, and a well-known actress, before her marriage. which included being the leading Lady in Gerald du Maurier's play London Pride. She was already known in the constituency for supporting her husband, and for having a genuine interest in farming; she and her husband ran a model farm in Esher. The fact that she came from a relatively poor background helped her considerably. It was no secret that she was willing to stand in order to keep the seat ready for her husband's eventual return.

The committee of Berwick-upon-Tweed Liberal Association on 7 May recommended as their candidate Captain the Hon. Harold Robson, who was the son of former Liberal Minister Lord Robson. Robson was educated at Eton and Oxford, had been called to the Bar in 1910, and had been awarded the Croix de Guerre during World War I. Robson was formally adopted, unanimously, on 10 May.

It was known early on that the Labour Party intended to stand a candidate, and the Berwick Labour Party adopted Councillor Gilbert Oliver as its candidate at a meeting in Alnwick on 12 May. Oliver was originally from Wooler, in the division, and had been a member of Newcastle-upon-Tyne City Council for four years; he was 56 at the time of the election and a working tailor.

== Campaign ==
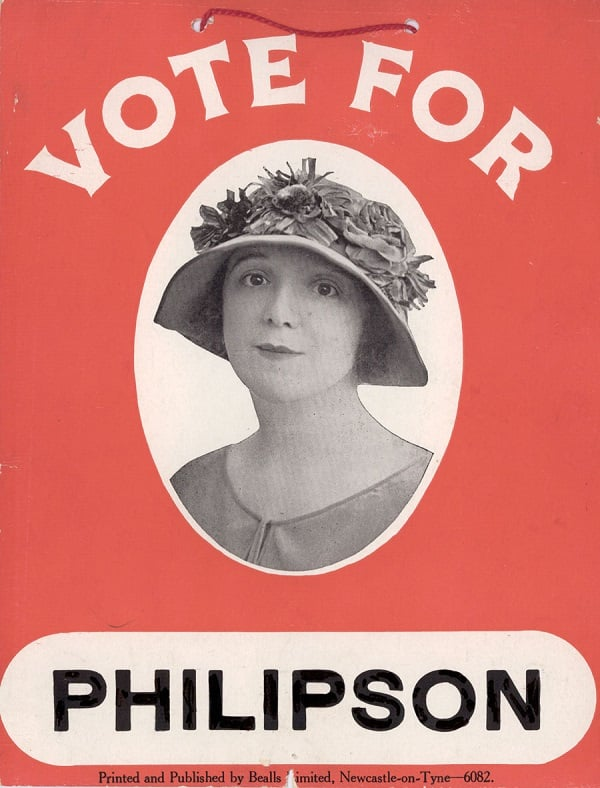
'Vote for Philipson' placard from the 1923 election

The writ instructing the Returning Officer to elect a new Member of Parliament for Berwick-upon-Tweed was moved in the House of Commons on 15 May. That night Mrs Philipson opened her campaign in Berwick with a "spirited" attack on the Labour attitude. She concentrated on building up personal contact with electors, especially the less fortunate, whom she told about the activities of Labour Members of Parliament such as Walton Newbold "shrieking about making the streets run with blood".

The Liberals started the campaign optimistically, thinking that they could rely on the 7,000 votes obtained by Runciman the previous November as a base, while some of the National Liberal votes would not support a Conservative, and that the presence of a Labour candidate would harm the Conservatives. Robson conducted day-wide motor tours of the constituency, speaking on foreign affairs where he opposed the French occupation of the Ruhr and called for an independent settlement with Germany.

Labour was thought to have a solid base in the constituency, in which there were 3,000 miners and 2,000 railwaymen, although the largest element in the workforce were 7,000 agricultural workers who were thought 'slow to change'. Oliver was reckoned to be the most fluent and politically knowledgeable of the candidates, and refuted claims of far left links, declaring "I am no Bolshevist, neither am I a patriotic tub-thumper" when he opened his campaign on 18 May. When Conservative Prime Minister Bonar Law was taken ill, Oliver paid tribute to his "transparent honesty" and gave hopes for a speedy recovery.

All three candidates handed in their nominations on 23 May together, with the parties each producing multiple forms in order to demonstrate their support. Philipson had 44 nomination papers, Robson 35, and Oliver had 12. The candidates kept up a hectic schedule of public meetings in the towns and villages in the division; on Tuesday 29 May Robson addressed ten separate meetings, while Oliver addressed eight (for a total of 50 since the beginning of the campaign).

=== Agriculture ===
While Philipson was supported by many of the largest farmers in the division, and Oliver appealed for the votes of agricultural workers by calling for a wages board to increase their pay, Robson's manifesto did not mention agriculture at all. This omission was seized on by visiting speaker Sir Thomas Inskip who accused the Liberals of having no policy. The Northumberland branch of the National Farmers Union sent Robson a questionnaire about his views, to which he replied with answers that The Times correspondent considered would be thought unfavourable by the farmers. By contrast, Philipson confidently promoted Government policy as helping farmers.

=== Liberal reunion ===
Because of her husband's involvement with the National Liberal Party, many National Liberals supported Philipson over Robson in the byelection; local National Liberals appeared on her platform and the local branch passed a resolution expressing support. This move was not encouraged by the national headquarters of the party, which had an eye on the eventual reunion of the Liberal Party. National Liberal MPs decided to offer Robson any assistance he might require. When a delegation of National Liberals turned up on 23 May to support Robson, the local National Liberals protested at the intrusion into their affairs.

The visit proved abortive with Robson distinctly cool about a Liberal reunion; he preferred to rely on a letter of support from the former Liberal MP for the division, Viscount Grey.

== Result ==
The result was declared on 1 June:

Berwick-upon-Tweed by-election, 1923
Party	Candidate	Votes	%	±%
Conservative	Mabel Philipson	12,000	55.0	New
Liberal	Harold Burge Robson	5,858	26.8	−11.3
Labour	Gilbert Oliver	3,966	18.2	New
Majority		6,142	28.1	N/A
Turnout		21,824	73.8	+7.6
Conservative gain from National Liberal		Swing		

Philipson therefore became the third woman MP. Her election had been expected but the majority had not; the Conservatives were said to have underestimated her vote, and overestimated the Liberal vote, by 2,000. Labour was reckoned to have performed adequately in a constituency it had not previously fought and where conducting an election campaign was very difficult.

So large was the crowd welcoming the Philipson back to her hotel in Berwick after the close of poll, that she had difficulty making her way through and received a black eye from an accidental blow from a policeman's elbow while he was trying to clear a way for her. The strain of the campaign caused her to lose her voice, and she delayed taking her seat until Thursday 7 June. When she did, the public gallery was crowded with "a wonderful collection of young women" said to be "gaily apparelled".

== See also ==
- 1941 Berwick-upon-Tweed by-election
- 1944 Berwick-upon-Tweed by-election
- 1973 Berwick-upon-Tweed by-election

== Sources ==
- Craig, F. W. S. (1983) [1969]. British parliamentary election results 1918-1949 (3rd ed.). Chichester: Parliamentary Research Services. ISBN 0-900178-06-X.
- Leigh Rayment's Historical List of MPs
