= Mabel Philipson =

British politician, former actress and Gaiety Girl

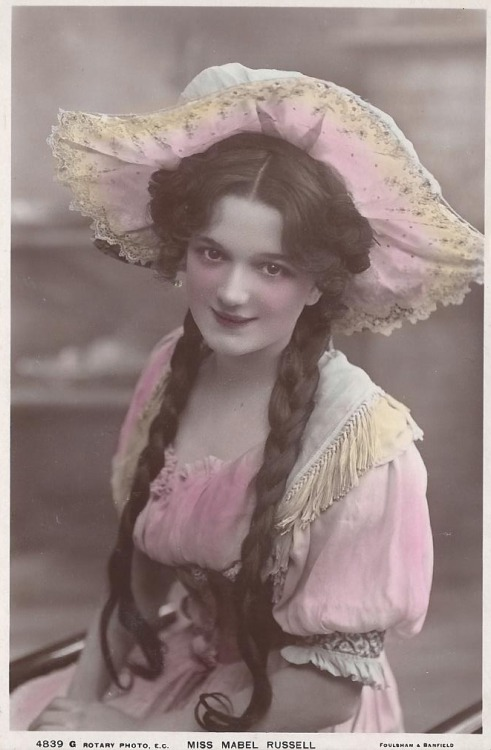

Member of Parliament for Berwick-upon-Tweed
- In office 31 May 1923 – 10 May 1929
- Preceded by: Hilton Philipson
- Succeeded by: Alfred Todd

Personal details
- Born: Mabel Russell; 2 January 1886 Peckham, Surrey, England
- Died: 9 January 1951 (aged 63) Brighton, Sussex, England
- Party: Conservative

Mabel Philipson (née Russell; 2 January 1886 – 9 January 1951), known as Mrs Hilton Philipson when not on the stage, was a British actress and politician. Having starred in multiple plays in London, including a period as a Gaiety Girl, Philipson left acting to marry Hilton Philipson in 1917. Her husband stood for the National Liberal party in the 1922 general election and although he was successful, the result was declared void. Philipson ran for the Conservative party in the subsequent by-election in 1923, securing a larger majority than her husband did. In doing so, she became the third woman to take a seat in the House of Commons after it became legally possible in 1918, as Member of Parliament (MP) for Berwick-upon-Tweed.

Philipson did not enjoy speaking in Parliament, so focused her energies on committee work and in her constituency. She was part of a parliamentary delegation to Italy 1924, meeting Benito Mussolini, who described her as "la bella Russell". In 1927, she submitted a private member's bill that subsequently passed as the Nursing Homes Registration Act 1927. Philipson retired from politics in 1929, when her husband left politics to focus on his business, stating that "the reason why I have held the seat has ceased to exist". She returned to acting for a period, before leaving that profession to focus on her children.

== Early life ==
Philipson was born Mabel Russell on 2 January 1886, (Note: There is some doubt regarding Philipson's birthdate, sources vary between 1886 and 1887 and also 1 or 2 January.) at 1 Copeland Avenue, Peckham. She was the eldest of three children of Albert Russell, a travelling sales representative from Birmingham and Alice Russell (née Shaw), a dressmaker. Due to the travelling nature of her father's role, Philipson helped to raise her siblings when her mother died in 1898.

== Acting career ==
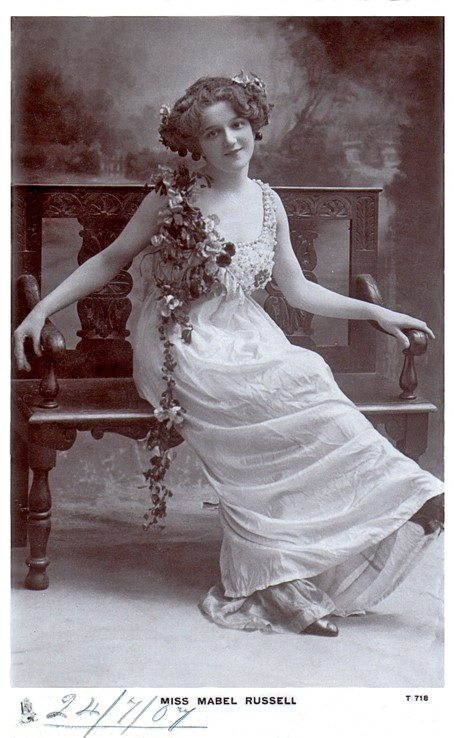
Mabel Russell in 1907

After leaving school Philipson found work in a Clapham Junction theatre box office before taking on a role in a play. She understudied for a lead pantomime actress, and took on the role when the leading lady became ill. This break led to a number of other roles, including becoming a Gaiety Girl at the London Gaiety Theatre where she was given a role in Havana, before taking on the role of Fifi in the 1907 London opening production of Merry Widow. In 1913, Philipson took on a role in Within The Law, a drama as recommended by Sir Herbert Tree. She was considered for the role of Eliza Doolittle in Pygmalion, but ultimately could not take it on due to contractual obligations. Instead she was the triumphant leading actress in the 1916 play, London Pride, produced by Frank Curzon and Gerald du Maurier, to positive reviews.

In 1916, Philipson decided to take a break from acting, eventually leaving it as a career when she married her second husband, Hilton Philipson. However, in 1925 she returned to acting in a midnight benefit for Middlesex Hospital and again for a run of a musical version The Beloved Vagabond during the parliamentary recess of 1927. For each role, she remained known by her maiden name, Mabel Russell.

After retiring from politics in 1929, Philipson returned to her acting career, with one significant film role in Tilly of Bloomsbury. There, she regularly referred to the director as "Mr. Speaker", to his surprise. Philipson's final performance was a run in Other People's Lives in 1933 at Wyndham's Theatre.

== Political career ==
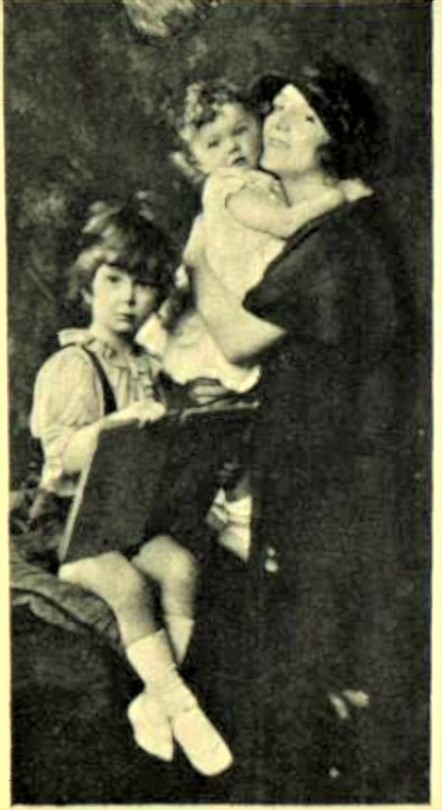
Mabel Philipson with her children in 1923 (Illustrated London News)

=== Election ===
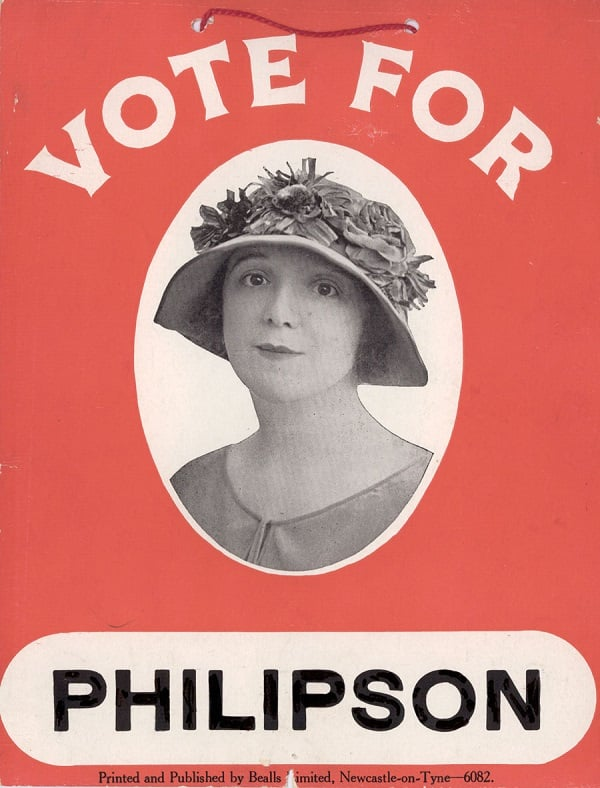
'Vote for Philipson' placard from the 1923 election

Hilton Philipson was elected as the National Liberal party's Member of Parliament for Berwick-upon-Tweed in the 1922 general election. He was, however, unseated on petition in 1923, due to campaign violations involving his agent. Although he was personally exonerated, he was also barred from standing in the constituency for seven years. Mabel Philipson agreed to stand in the resulting by-election, but only as a Conservative. Philipson was considered a natural campaigner, who would court the press, blow kisses to the crowd and sign autographs. She was quick witted with hecklers and her theatrical training made her an excellent public speaker, so even after her election she would carry on speaking at political rallies. Philipson was also happy to canvass the more deprived areas of Berwick, bringing up members of the public to join her for press photographs.

Also standing in the by-election were Harold Burge Robson for the Liberal party and Gilbert Oliver for the Labour party. There was significant interest in speeches from the candidates, so the Mayor had to allocate the Town Hall steps to each party on different nights. During the election the MPs Margaret Wintringham and Nancy Astor, as well as Philipson, were named at "Piety, Sobriety and Variety". Philipson won the by-election, taking the seat that the Liberal party had held for 37 years since the Redistribution of Seats Act 1885. Her majority was over 6000, larger than her husband's the previous year. (Note: Mabel Philipson received 12,000 votes in the by-election, followed by Harold Burge Robson who received 5,858 and Gilbert Oliver who received 3,966 – a majority of 6,142.) In the Dundee Courier & Argus, her success put down to "local conditions, sympathy with Captain Philipson, and resentment at his unseating", while she herself attributed it to the support of women and ex-service men.

Thousands attended the announcement of the results on 31 May 1922, enthusiastically cheering despite the High Sheriff's appeals for quiet while the numbers were being announced. Philipson was unable to speak after the result, having developed a sore throat during the campaign, she was escorted by six police bodyguards back to the Conservative Committee Rooms, where she appeared at the window and her husband expressed her thanks on her behalf. Philipson was then escorted through the crowds to her hotel but was accidentally elbowed by a policeman trying to make a passage through, resulting in a black eye.

Though wearing a different label
Than her husband — she's proved just as able;
and as Berwick's M.P.
Soon we all hope to see
In the House a "Big Part" — played by Mabel!

— Limerick about the Berwick by-election

=== Time in Parliament ===
On 7 June 1923, Philipson became the third woman to take a seat in Parliament, nearly five years after the Parliament (Qualification of Women) Act 1918 had been given Royal assent. When she entered the House of Commons for the first time, she was surrounded by the Members of Parliament from both sides who congratulated her. As debate was ongoing, the Speaker had to actively call the House to order.

"Lady Astor, MP for sobriety,
Mrs Wintringham; She's for propriety,
Now Berwick-on-Tweed
With all speed has decreed,
Mrs Phillipson wins – for Variety"

— Quips regarding the first three ladies in Parliament, in limerick form.

Philipson signed the roll, shook the Speaker's hand and then joined the other two women in Parliament for a long conversation. The gallery was full of ladies watching Philipson taking her seat. During the signing, there were a few comments from other members reportedly in good humour, including a call of "Cheer up, Mabel", a sarcastic "Good old National Liberals" – who had previously held her seat and a comment that Nancy Astor would soon be "on the dole".

While sitting in Parliament, Philipson took a particular interest in housing, agriculture, infant welfare and women's issues. Although each woman of the time spoke more than the average man in Parliament, Philipson herself disliked parliamentary speaking, instead focussing on her constituency and committee work. She was part of the Joint Select Committee regarding Guardianship of Infants Bill 1923. She joined the Air Committee in 1925.

In 1924, Philipson was part of a parliamentary delegation to Italy, where she was the only woman on the trip. There she met Pope Pius XI and Benito Mussolini. Mussolini had previously expressed amusement at the idea of women in Parliament, referring to Philipson as "la bella Russell".

In 1927, Philipson began a movement for stricter registration of nursing homes, and when she drew the ballot to present a private member's bill, she chose to present the Nursing Homes Registration Act 1927 requiring nursing homes to register and ensuring that they would be regularly inspected.

Outside of Parliament, she was 1927 Vice President of the Electric Association for Women, a member of the Women's Engineering Society and life governor of the Middlesex Hospital.

=== Retirement ===
Throughout her time in office, Philipson considered her seat to be held until her husband could return, and would not step down unless he could be considered in her place. Her husband acknowledged that she wanted to focus on being a mother in 1924, but she remained in Parliament until she announced her resignation in 1928. Philipson cited her young family as one of the main reasons for leaving, but also that her husband had decided to move away from politics and focus on his business work due to the effect of coal disputes and residual costs from his unseating. Philipson's own summation was "the reason why I have held the seat has ceased to exist".

== Personal life ==
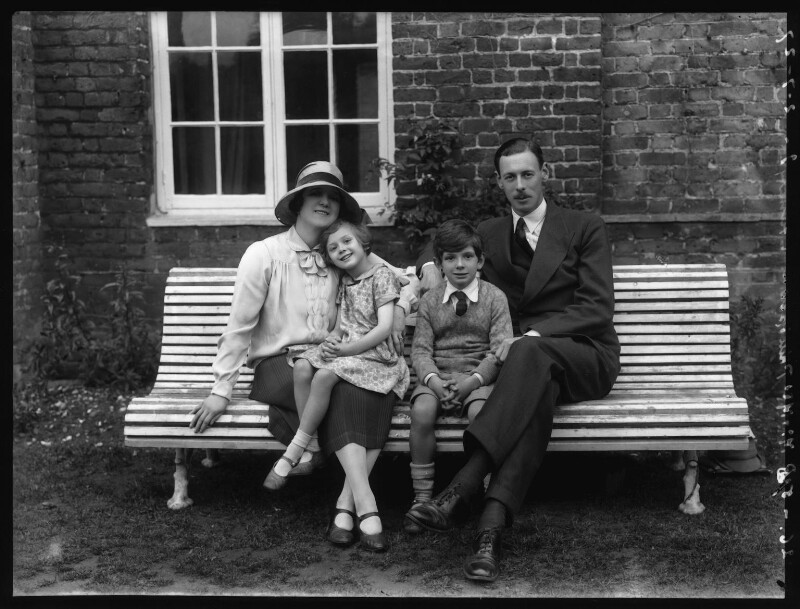
The Philipson family in 1927 (National Portrait Gallery, London)

In February 1911, Philipson married Thomas Stanley Rhodes, nephew of Cecil Rhodes. Less than six months later, in August, Stanley Rhodes was killed in a car crash near Brooklands racing circuit. Philipson was also injured in the same accident, losing her vision in one eye.

In 1917 she married Hilton Philipson, then a lieutenant in the Scots Guards, and had three children, twin sons and a daughter. One of her sons died soon after childbirth. Hilton Philipson left the Scots Guards as a captain, becoming a director of the North Eastern Railway Company. Philipson announced her retirement from both politics in 1929 and acting in 1933, to focus on looking after her children. Her husband died in 1941 at the age of 48 at Vale Royal Abbey in Cheshire, and Philipson herself died on 9 January 1951 in a nursing home in Brighton.

== Selected filmography ==
- Sons of Martha (1907)
- Masks and Faces (1917)
- Tilly of Bloomsbury (1931)

== Notes ==
Parliament of the United Kingdom
Preceded by Hilton Philipson	Member of Parliament for Berwick-upon-Tweed; 1923–1929	Succeeded by Alfred Todd
