= William Holmes (politician) =

Irish politician

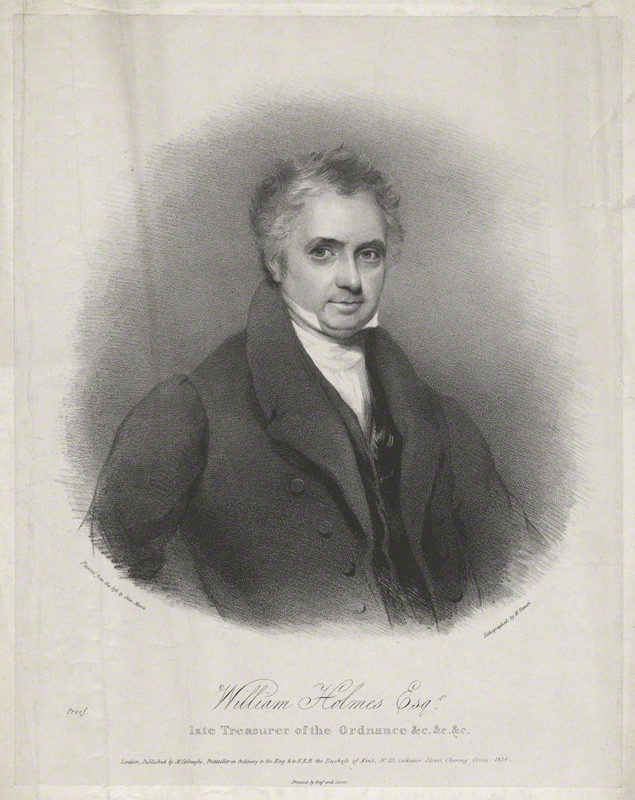
William Holmes, 1834 lithograph

William Holmes (2 April 1779 – 26 January 1851) was an Irish Tory and Conservative politician in the United Kingdom in the early nineteenth century. He was an MP for 28 years.

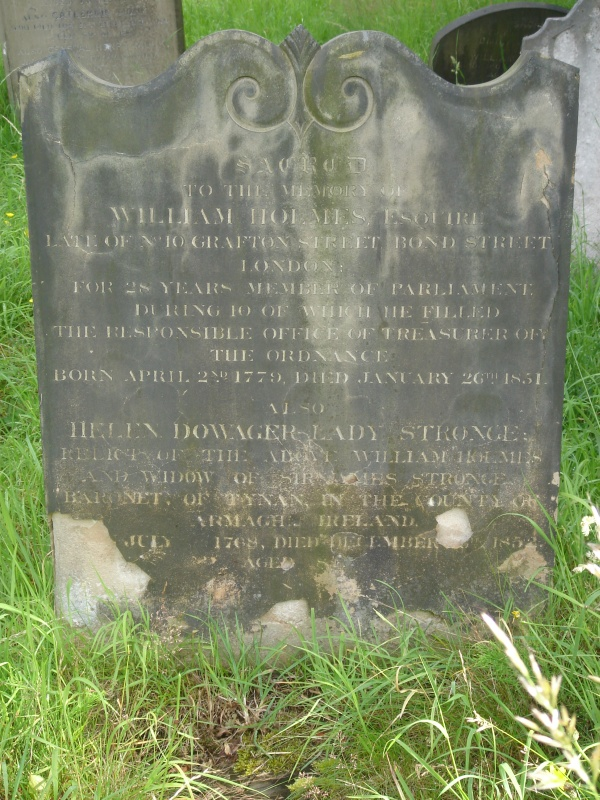
Funerary monument, Brompton Cemetery, London

== Life ==
He was born in County Sligo, the son of Thomas Holmes of Farmhill, a brewer, and his wife Anne Phibbs, daughter of Harlow Phibbs. He matriculated in 1795 at Trinity College, Dublin, but did not take a degree. Then an army officer, he was secretary to Sir Thomas Hislop, 1st Baronet with rank of captain in the West Indies, from 1803 to 1807. Retiring from the army in 1807, he married and entered Parliament in 1808, as Member for Grampound.

Holmes served as party manager, and Chief Whip in the House of Commons from about 1818 until his seat (for the rotten borough of Haslemere) was abolished by the Reform Act 1832. He had also previously represented several other constituencies. In the dedication to his novel The Member: An Autobiography (1832), the Scottish author John Galt pays sardonic tribute to his skillful dispensation of political patronage. After the Reform Act Holmes was out of the Commons for five years, but returned in 1837 as MP for Berwick-upon-Tweed.

In 1830 Holmes had had a narrow escape at the opening of the Liverpool and Manchester Railway, during the incident which led to the death of William Huskisson. Like Huskisson, Holmes had alighted from the special train of dignitaries at a scheduled stop. When a train came the other way down the adjacent line, Holmes, like Huskisson, was unable to reboard the stationary train in time. However, Holmes stood stock-still in the small gap between the two trains and survived unscathed, whereas Huskisson panicked and was hit by the moving train.

Holmes was also Treasurer of the Ordnance from 1818 to 1831.

His wife was Helen Tew, Dowager Lady Stronge (1769–1852), widow of Sir James Stronge, 1st Baronet of Tynan Abbey, County Armagh, Ireland (1750–1804).

Holmes died in 1851 aged 71 and is buried in Brompton Cemetery, London.

== Bibliography ==
- Leigh Rayment's Historical List of MPs

Parliament of the United Kingdom
Preceded by Robert Williams; John Teed	Member of Parliament for Grampound; 1808–1812; With: Hon. George Cochrane 1808–1812; Hon. Andrew Cochrane-Johnstone 1812	Succeeded by Hon. Andrew Cochrane-Johnstone; John Teed
Preceded by William Gore-Langton; James O'Callaghan	Member of Parliament for Tregony; 1812–1818; With: Alexander Grant	Succeeded by Viscount Barnard; James O'Callaghan
Preceded by Thomas Courtenay; Ayshford Wise	Member of Parliament for Totnes; 1818–1820; With: Thomas Courtenay	Succeeded by Thomas Courtenay; John Bent
Preceded by Douglas Kinnaird; William Clive	Member of Parliament for Bishop's Castle; 1820–1830; With: Edward Rogers	Succeeded by Frederick Hamilton Cornewall; Edward Rogers
Preceded by The Lord Downes; John Capel	Member of Parliament for Queenborough; 1830; With: Sir Philip Durham	Succeeded by John Capel; Thomas Gladstone
Preceded by Sir John Beckett; George Lowther Thompson	Member of Parliament for Haslemere; 1830–1832; With: Sir John Beckett	Constituency abolished
Preceded by Sir Rufane Shaw Donkin; James Bradshaw	Member of Parliament for Berwick-upon-Tweed; 1837–1841; With: Richard Hodgson	Succeeded by Richard Hodgson; Matthew Forster
Political offices
Preceded by Thomas Alcock	Treasurer of the Ordnance; 1818–1831	Succeeded by Thomas Creevey
