= John Campbell Renton =

British politician

John Campbell-Renton

Member of Parliament for Berwick-upon-Tweed
- In office 30 July 1847 – 8 July 1852 Serving with Matthew Forster
- Preceded by: Matthew Forster; Richard Hodgson
- Succeeded by: Matthew Forster; John Stapleton

Personal details
- Born: 22 April 1814
- Died: 25 February 1856 (aged 41)
- Party: Conservative
- Parent(s): Robert Campbell; Susanna Renton

John Campbell-Renton (22 April 1814 – 25 February 1856) was a British Conservative politician.

The son of Robert Campbell and Susanna (née Renton), Campbell-Renton was elected Conservative MP for Berwick-upon-Tweed at the 1847 general election but lost the seat at the next election in 1852. He attempted to regain the seat at a by-election in 1853—caused by the 1852 election being declared void on account of bribery—but was unsuccessful.

Parliament of the United Kingdom
Preceded by Richard Hodgson; Matthew Forster	Member of Parliament for Berwick-upon-Tweed; 1847–1852; With: Matthew Forster	Succeeded by Matthew Forster; John Stapleton
