= Edward Lively (MP) =

English politician

Edward Lively (1586–1650) was an English politician who sat in the House of Commons for Berwick-upon-Tweed from 1624 to 1628.
