= Richard Hodgson-Huntley =

British politician and railway entrepreneur

Richard Hodgson-Huntley JP MP
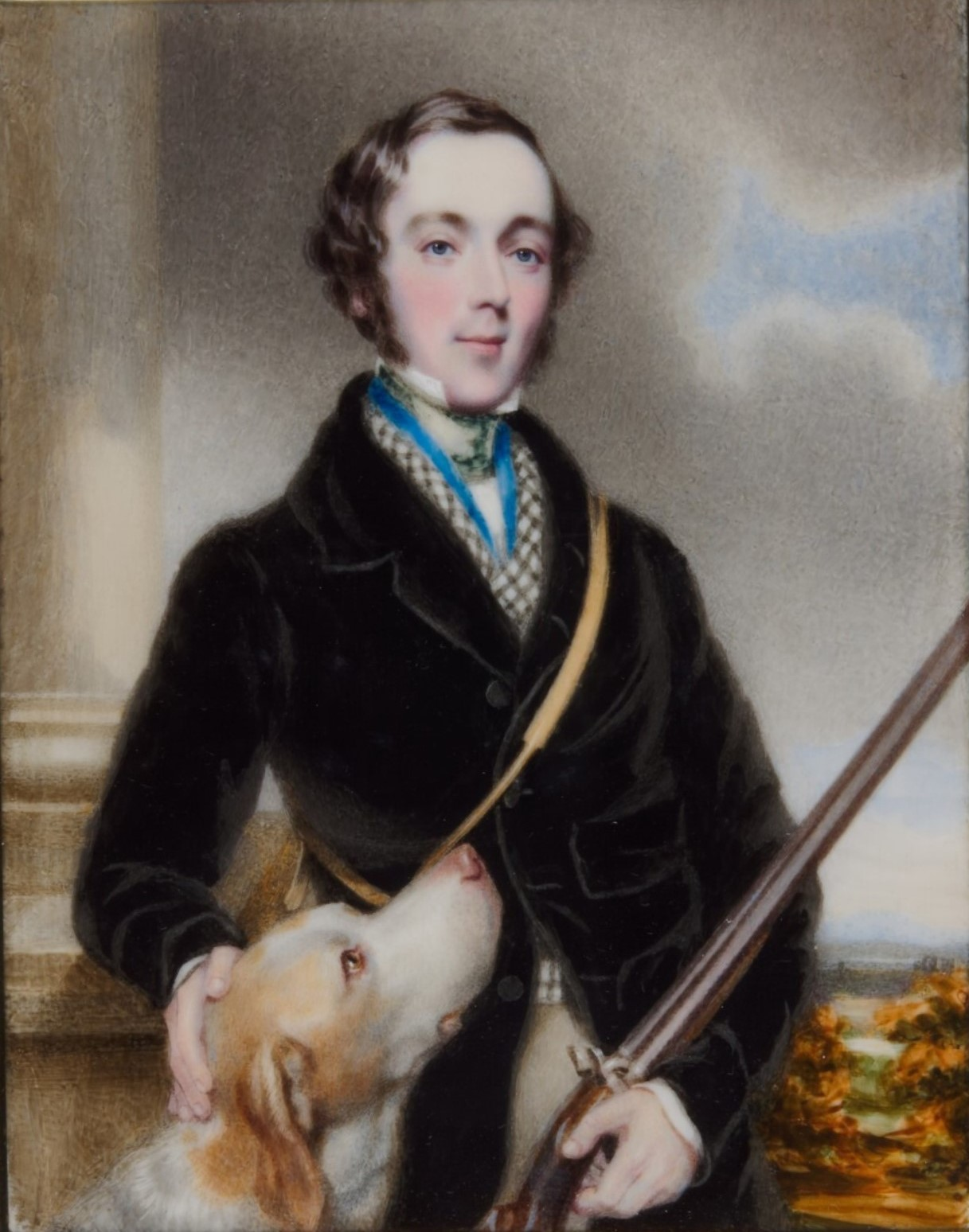
- Portrait of Richard Hodgson, circa 1840

Member of Parliament for Tynemouth and North Shields
- In office 23 April 1861 – 12 July 1865
- Preceded by: Hugh Taylor
- Succeeded by: George Trevelyan

Member of Parliament for Berwick-upon-Tweed
- In office 26 July 1837 – 30 July 1847 Serving with Matthew Forster (1841–1847); William Holmes (1837–1841)
- Preceded by: Rufane Shaw Donkin; James Bradshaw
- Succeeded by: Matthew Forster; John Campbell Renton

Personal details
- Born: Richard Hodgson; 1 April 1812
- Died: 22 December 1877 (aged 65) Edinburgh, Scotland
- Party: Conservative
- Spouse: Catherine Moneypenny Compton
- Parent(s): John Hodgson; Sarah Huntley
- Relatives: John Hodgson Hinde (brother)

Richard Hodgson-Huntley JP MP (1 April 1812 – 22 December 1877), also known as Richard Hodgson until 1870, was a British Conservative Party politician and railway entrepreneur.

== Family ==
Known as Hodgson at the time, Hodgson-Huntley was the second son of John Hodgson and Sarah, daughter of Richard Huntley. He married Catherine Moneypenny, daughter of Anthony Compton. They had at least one child: Katherine Isabella.

== Political career ==
The then-Hodgson was elected a protectionist Conservative MP for Berwick-upon-Tweed in 1837. He held the seat until 1847 when he stood down in order to contest Newcastle upon Tyne, a seat his brother, John Hodgson, was retiring from; he was unsuccessful.

Hodgson returned to Berwick-upon-Tweed to contest the 1852 general election and by-elections in 1853 and 1859 but failed to recapture the seat.

He later returned to parliament for Tynemouth and North Shields, elected at the by-election in 1861 and held the seat until 1865 when he was defeated.

== Railways ==
From 1855 to 1866, Hodgson-Huntley was the chairman of the North British Railway Board of Directors. He joined at a time of particular financial discordance, after former chairman John Learmonth had invested heavily in subscriptions to other railways, with huge sums being written off in failed ventures, and similar sized sums were being sought for new ones.

Hodgson-Huntley's reign saw the company's financial position significantly improved and, within one year of his chairmanship beginning, operating expenses were cut to 44% and he announced the company was free from debt, and a dividend of 2.5% to shareholders. Although the company's dividends varied during his chairmanship – such as in 1862 when capital commitments again swamped the company's financial resources – they regularly hit up to 3%.

Yet, twice in 1866, he proposed a 3% dividend on ordinary shares, only for the share price to decline. On the second occasion, a new company secretary, John Walker, alerted the finance committee to poor company finances. A new preference share issue had been flopped, and it was impossible to pay debenture interest and preference share-guaranteed dividends. This revelation saw ordinary shares fall in value by 8% overnight, and widespread financial impropriety and falsification accounts were blamed on Hodgson, causing a special general meeting on 14 November 1866. Hodgson decided not to attend, instead tendering his resignation from the board, while blaming his non-attendance on a headache.

== Other activities ==
He also chaired the Tweed Commissions, and a Justice of the Peace for Northumberland. In 1877, until his death, he was High Sheriff of Northumberland. In 1870 he ordered the first rebuilding of Carham Hall to create four bays along its Southern Elevation.

Parliament of the United Kingdom
Preceded by Hugh Taylor	Member of Parliament for Tynemouth and North Shields; 1861–1865	Succeeded by George Trevelyan
Preceded by Rufane Shaw Donkin; James Bradshaw	Member of Parliament for Berwick-upon-Tweed; 1837–1847; With: Matthew Forster (1841–1847); William Holmes (1837–1841)	Succeeded by Matthew Forster; John Campbell Renton
