= David Milne-Home =

Scottish advocate, geologist and meteorologist (1805-1890)

David Milne-Home FRSE FGS PGSE LLD
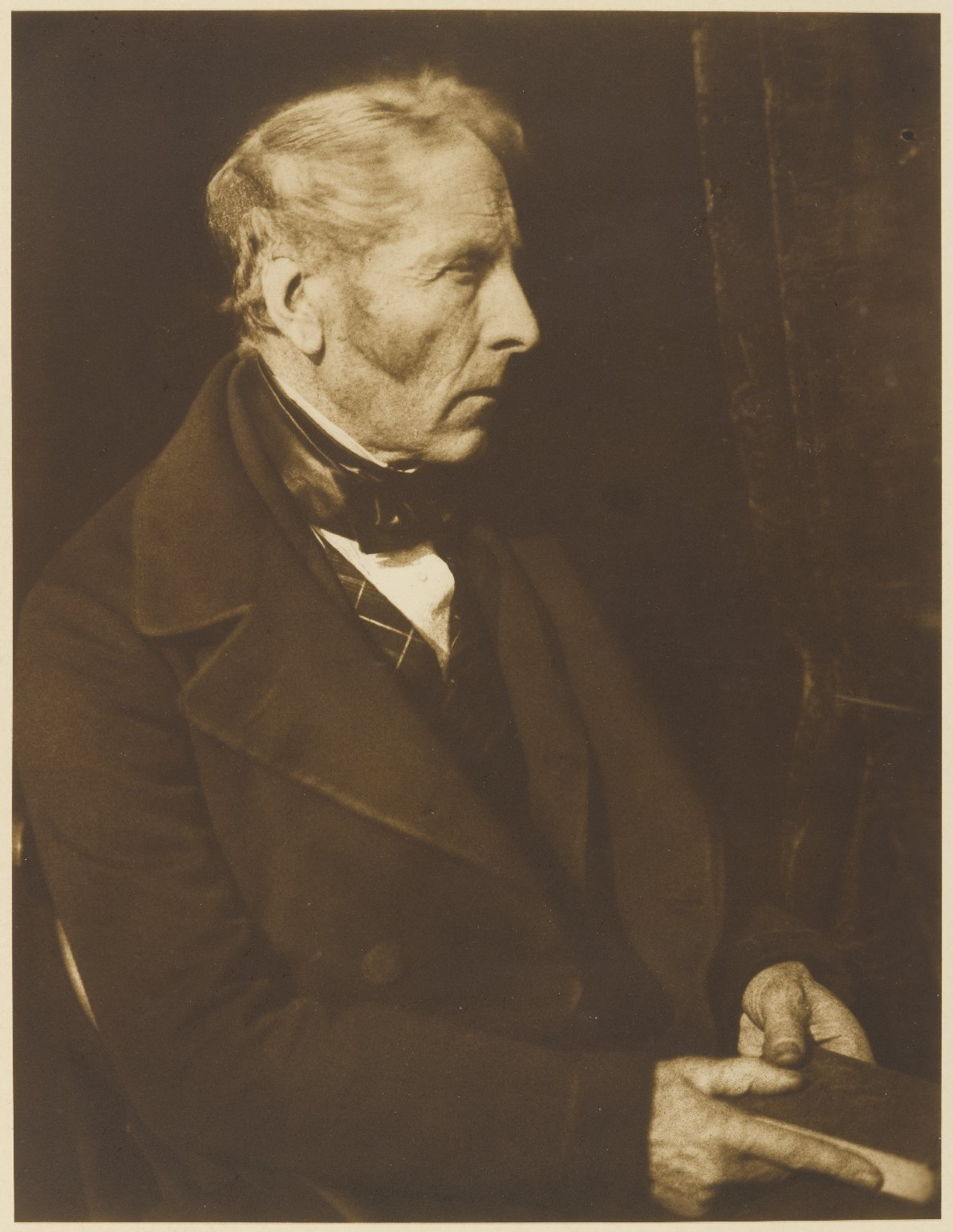
- David Milne-Home

Leader of Berwickshire County Council
- In office 1876–1889

Personal details
- Born: 22 January 1805 Inveresk, Scotland
- Died: 19 September 1890 (aged 85) Hutton, Scottish Borders, Scotland
- Spouse: Jean Margaret Home (m. 1832)
- Parents: Admiral Sir David Milne (father); Grace Purves (mother)
- Relatives: Alexander Milne (brother); David Milne Home (son)
- Education: Musselburgh Grammar School; Royal High School, Edinburgh
- Alma mater: University of Edinburgh

David Milne-Home of Milne Graden FRSE FGS PGSE LLD (1805–1890) was a Scottish advocate, geologist and meteorologist. He was the founder of the Scottish Meteorological Society in 1855, and served as its chairman. From 1874 to 1889 he served as president of the Edinburgh Geological Society

== Life ==
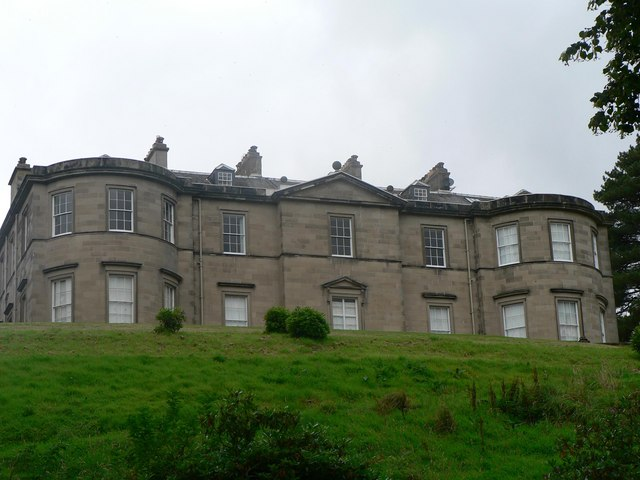
Milne Graden House

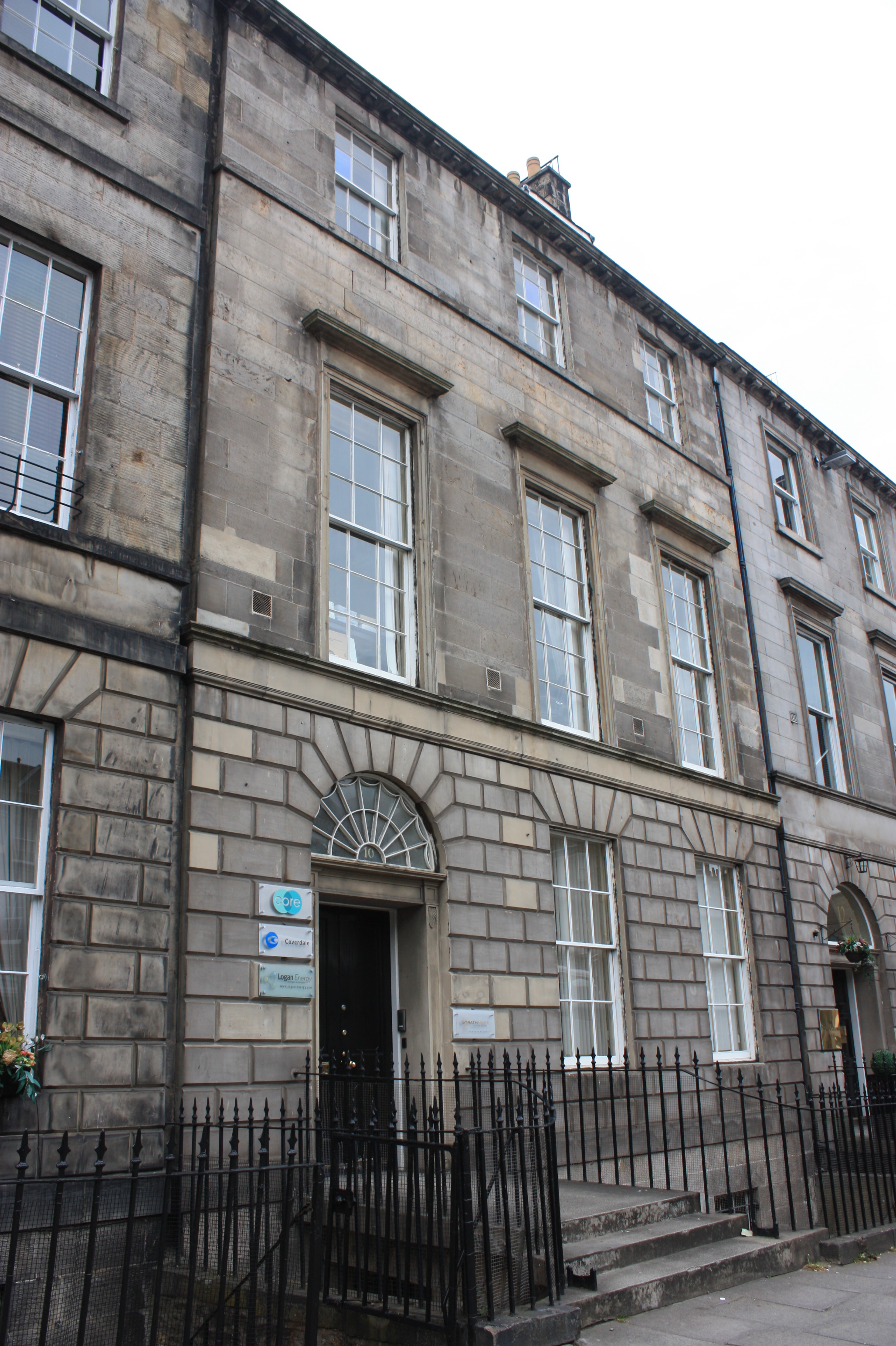
10 York Place, Edinburgh

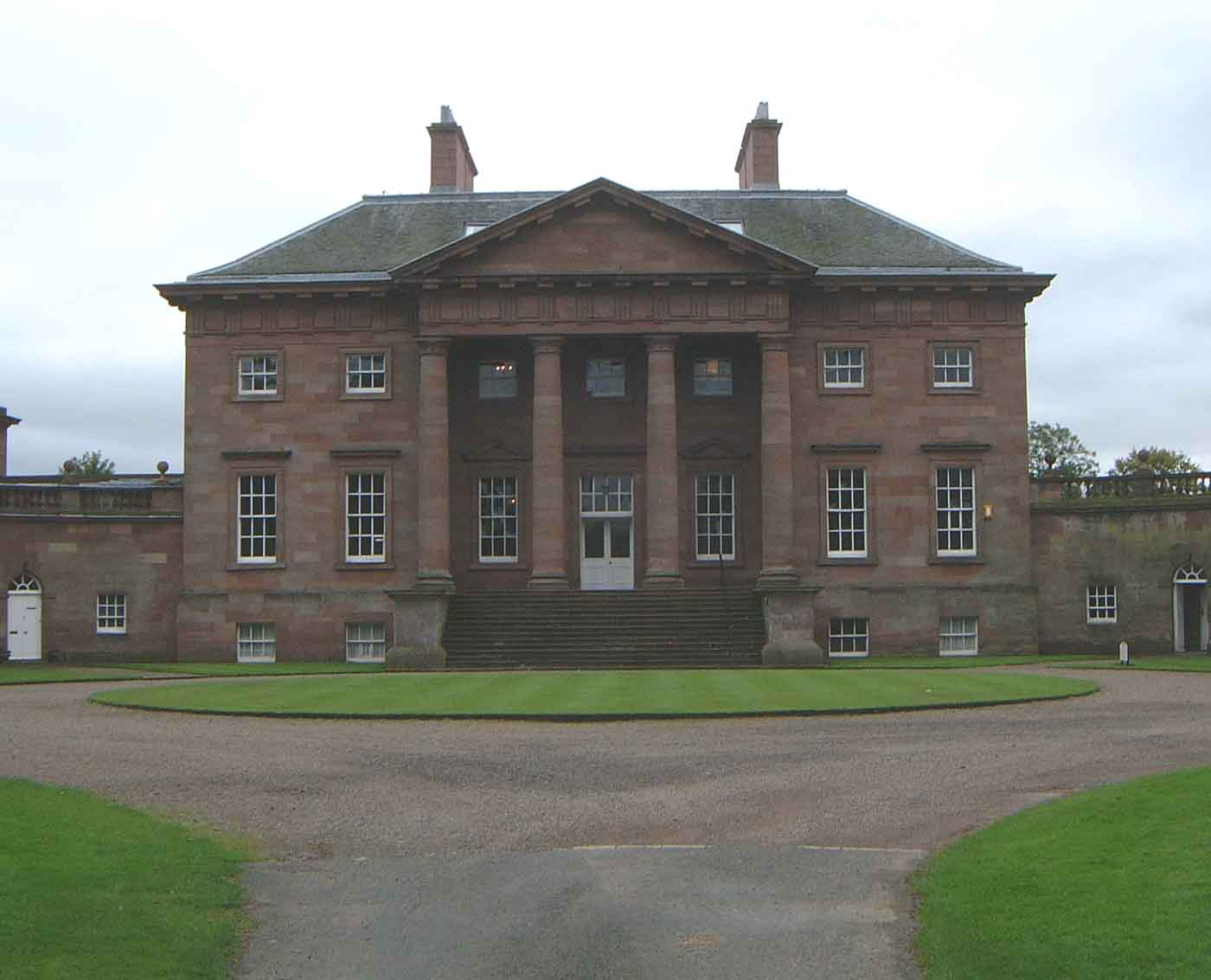
Paxton House

He was born David Milne in Inveresk east of Edinburgh on 22 January 1805 the son of Grace (née Purves) and Admiral Sir David Milne of Milne-Graden FRSE. His younger brother became Admiral of the Fleet Sir Alexander Milne, 1st Baronet. David was educated at Musselburgh Grammar School then the High School in Edinburgh.

He studied law at the University of Edinburgh and became an advocate in 1826. In 1828 he was elected a fellow of the Royal Society of Edinburgh his proposer was Norwich Duff. At age 23 this made him one of its youngest members. He served as secretary to the society 1840 to 1848 and as vice president for most of the period 1865 to 1888, serving more years in this role than any other person.

Milne was the junior defence counsel for the notorious grave-robber William Burke, and later served as Advocate-Depute for the Crown Office.

In 1840 he was living at 10 York Place, Edinburgh, a huge Georgian townhouse.

In 1845 he inherited Milne-Graden House, and Paxton House in 1852.

As a deeply religious man, he viewed glacial deposits as evidence of the biblical flood.

He is remembered today chiefly for his work on earthquakes. As Secretary of the British Association of the Advancement of Science Earthquakes Committee from 1840 to around 1845, he published extensive reports into the earthquake swarm at Comrie, Perthshire, a catalogue of earthquakes in Britain culled from historical sources, and theoretical observations on earthquake phenomena that were advanced for their time.

It was Milne who coined the word "seismometer" in 1841, to describe an instrument designed by James David Forbes.

From 1876 until 1889 he led Berwickshire County Council during which period (in 1881) he organised for the relief of the families of the numerous fishermen lost in the Eyemouth Disaster.

He died at Milne-Graden House on 19 September 1890. He is buried in Hutton churchyard.

== Family ==
Milne married Jean Forman-Home in 1832. On the death of her father in 1852 they adopted the famous name Home, thereafter being Milne-Home. At this point they inherited the Wedderburn, Billie and Paxton estates in 1852.
