= Matthew Forster =

British politician and merchant

Matthew Forster MP

Member of Parliament for Berwick-upon-Tweed
- In office 1 July 1841 – 25 April 1853 Serving with John Stapleton (1852–1853); John Campbell Renton (1847–1852); Richard Hodgson (1841–1847)
- Preceded by: William Holmes; Richard Hodgson
- Succeeded by: Dudley Marjoribanks; John Forster

Personal details
- Born: 1786
- Died: 2 September 1869 (aged 83)
- Party: Whig

Matthew Forster MP (1786 – 2 September 1869) was a British Whig politician and merchant.

Forster was elected Whig MP for Berwick-upon-Tweed at the 1841 general election and held the seat until 1853 when he was unseated due to bribery and treating during the 1852 general election. At the ensuing by-election, his son John Forster was elected as a Whig candidate. Forster attempted to regain the seat at the 1857 general election but ranked bottom of the poll.

Forster, "a wealthy and highly respected ship-owner and merchant" had mining interests, as a senior partner in Forster, Smith and Company, in both south County Durham and The Gambia.

In 1840 Richard Robert Madden (the Special Commissioner of Inquiry into the British Settlements on the West Coast of Africa) reported that Forster was one of the London-based merchants who were actively (and illegally) helping the slave traders. However, Forster managed to escape criminal prosecution. In 1841 there was a change of government, and the new government chose not to send the matter to the Queen's Bench, but to a House of Commons committee that Forster himself was part of. Unsurprisingly, this committee rejected most of Madden's findings.

Parliament of the United Kingdom
| Preceded by William Holmes; Richard Hodgson | Member of Parliament for Berwick-upon-Tweed; 1841–1853; With: John Stapleton (1852–1853); John Campbell Renton (1847–1852); Richard Hodgson (1841–1847) | Succeeded by Dudley Marjoribanks; John Forster |
