= Rufane Shaw Donkin =

British Army officer and politician (1772–1841)

Lieutenant-General Sir Rufane Shaw Donkin KCB GCH FRS FRGS
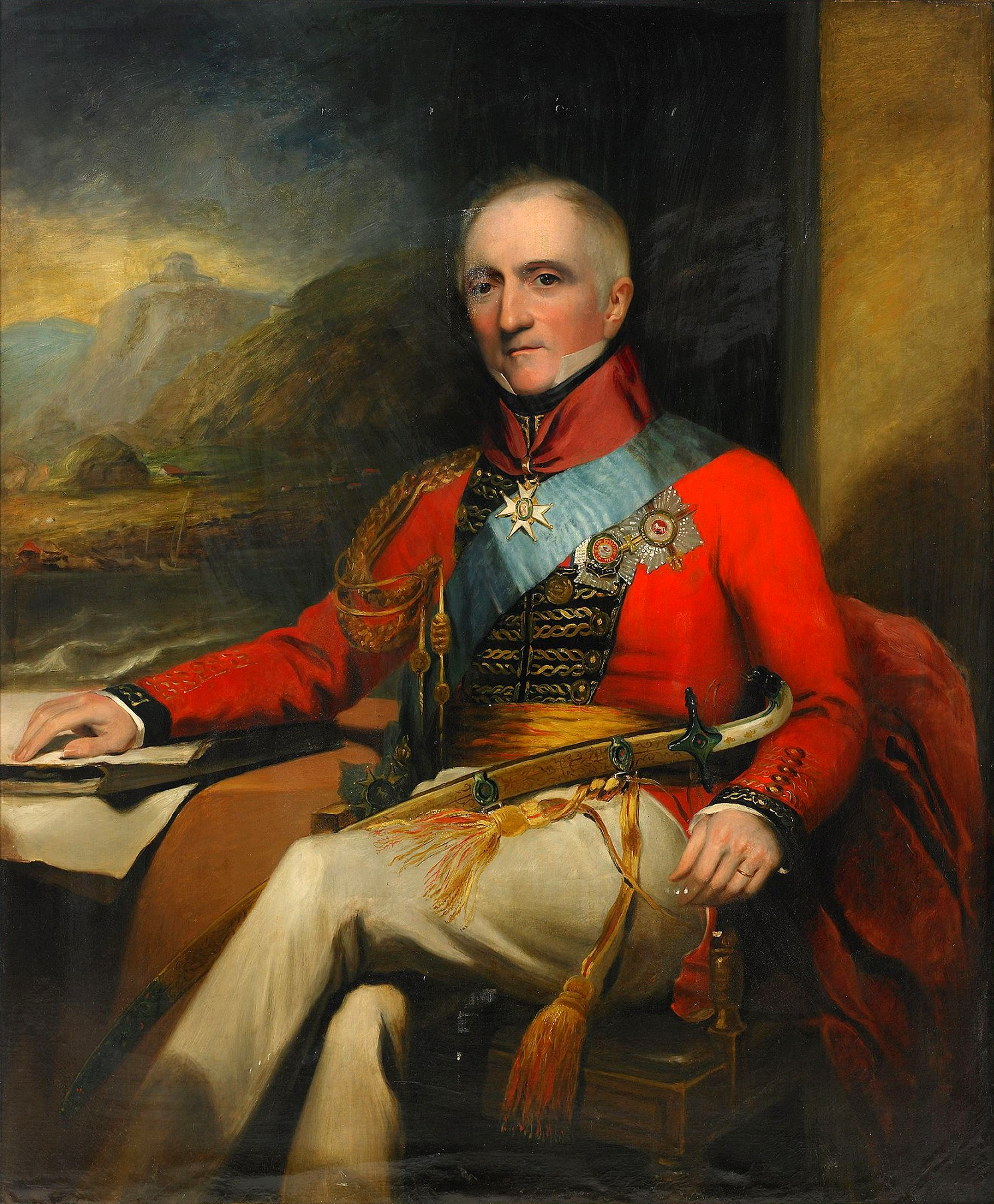
- Born: 1772
- Died: 1 May 1841 (aged 68-69)
- Military career
- Allegiance: Great Britain; United Kingdom
- Branch: British Army
- Rank: Lieutenant-General
- Conflicts: French Revolutionary Wars; West Indies Campaign; Expedition to Ostend; Napoleonic Wars; Copenhagen Expedition; Peninsular War; Second Battle of Porto; Battle of Talavera; Third Anglo-Maratha War
- Awards: Knight Grand Cross of the Royal Guelphic Order; Knight Commander of the Order of the Bath

Lieutenant-General Sir Rufane Shaw Donkin KCB GCH FRS FRGS (1772 – 1 May 1841) was a British Army officer and politician.

== Background ==
Rufane Donkin came of a military family and was the eldest child of General Robert Donkin, who had served with many famous British commanders including Wolfe and Gage and his Colonel, William Rufane. Young Rufane was baptised at St David's Church, Exeter, on 9 October 1772 with the name Rusaw Shaw Donkin..

== Service ==
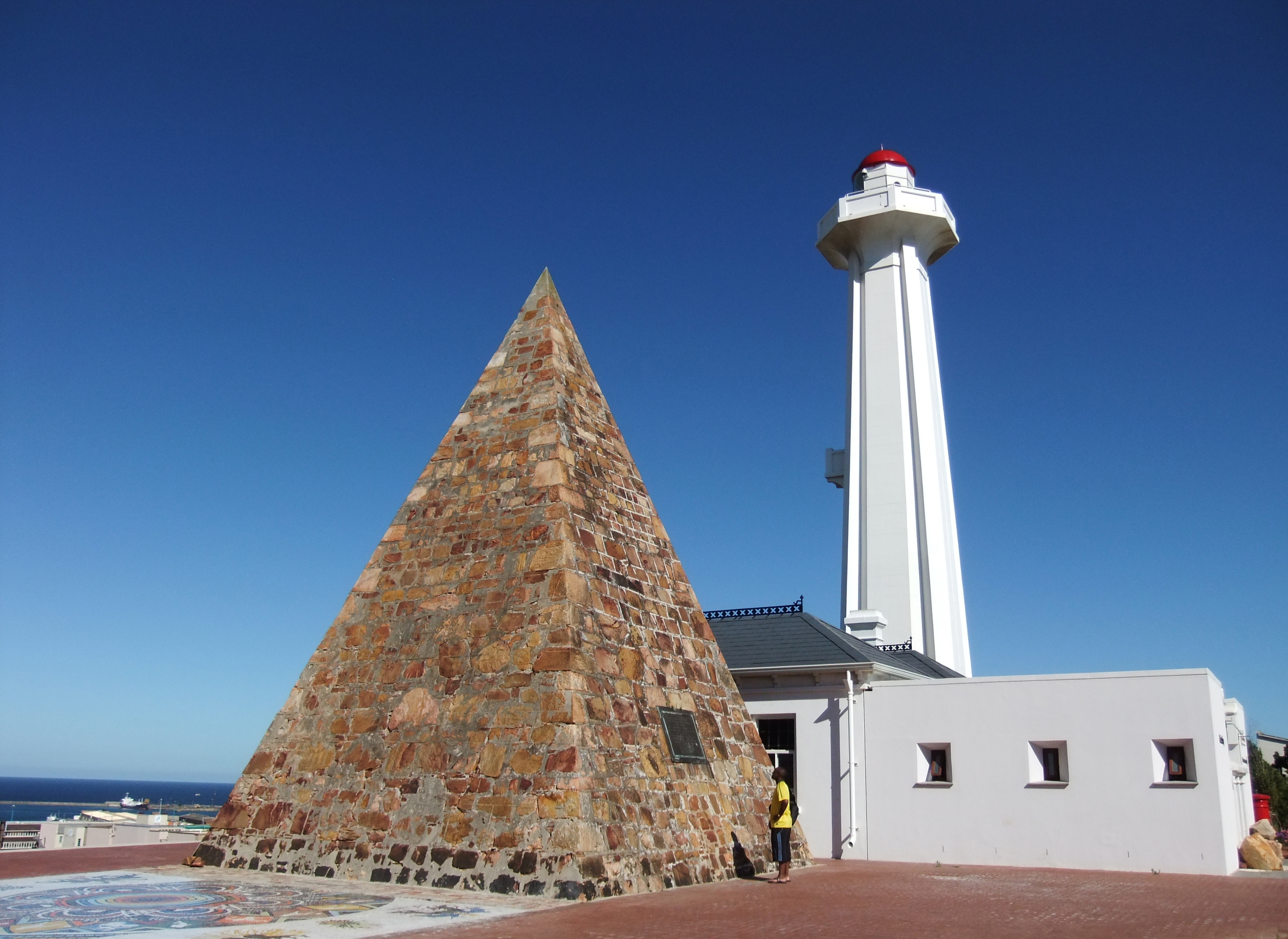
The Donkin Memorial, Donkin Reserve, Port Elizabeth

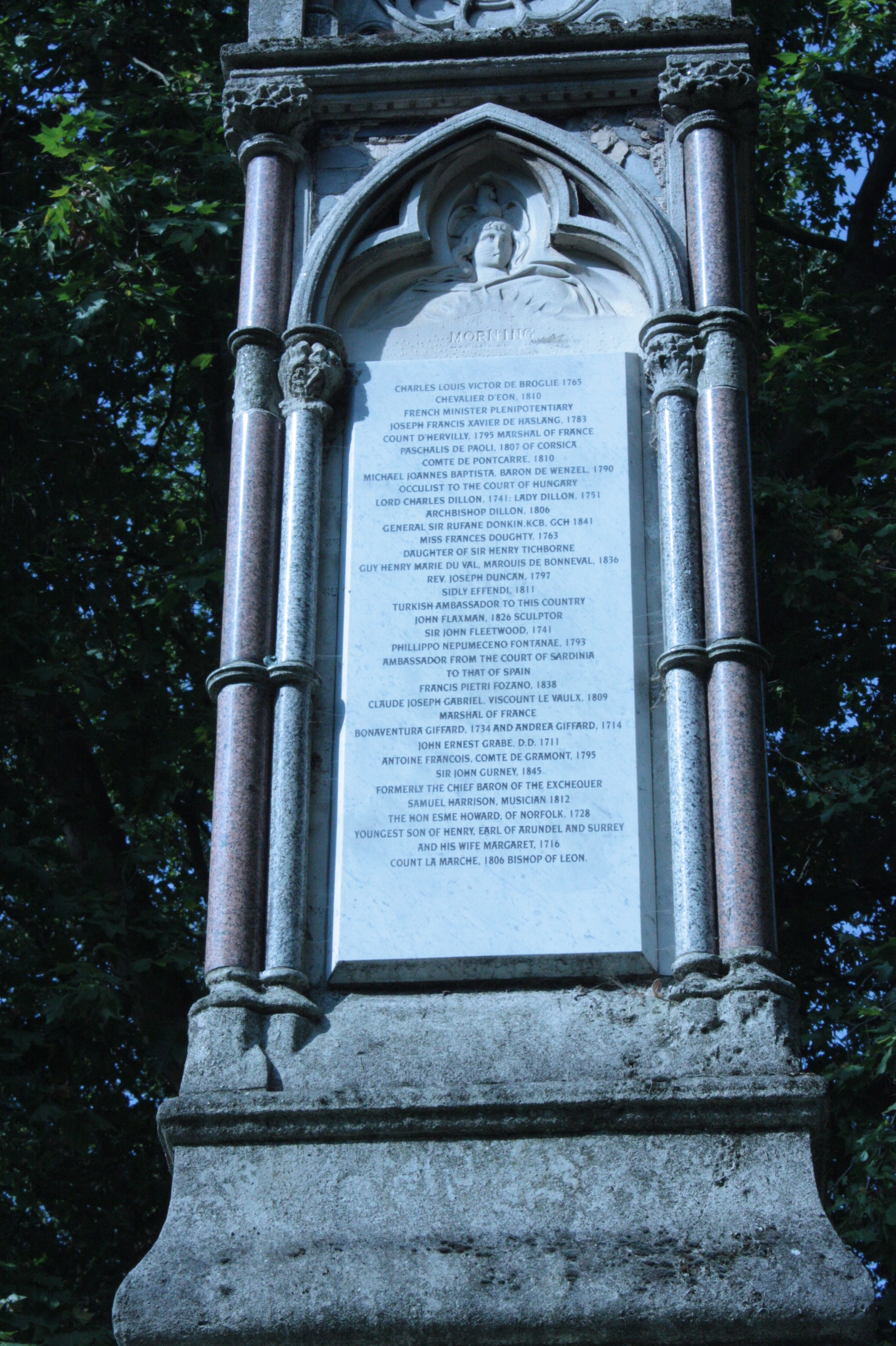
Donkin's name listed on the south face of the Burdett-Coutts Memorial Sundial

Becoming a captain in 1793, Donkin saw active service in the West Indies in the next year, gaining promotion to major in 1796. At the age of twenty-five he became a lieutenant colonel and in 1798 led a light battalion with distinction in Popham's expedition to Ostend. He served with Cathcart in Denmark in 1807 and two years later won command of a brigade of three regiments in the army in Portugal, which he led in victory at the Second Battle of Porto (May 1809).

On the day before the Battle of Talavera (July 1809), an advance French force surprised Donkin's brigade (positioned ahead of the main British army) before they could post pickets: the British had over 400 casualties. Donkin fell back, rallied the men at the main line and led the brigade throughout the battle.

The Army then transferred Donkin, in the role of quartermaster-general, to the Mediterranean command. He served there from 1810 to 1813, taking part in the Catalan expeditions under Lieutenant-General Frederick Maitland (1812) and Lord William Bentinck (1813). In July 1815, the now Major-General Donkin received a posting to India, distinguishing himself as a divisional commander in Hastings's operations against the Mahrattas (1817–1818) and receiving the KCB as his reward. The death of his young wife Elizabeth Frances née Markham seriously affected him, after that he went to the Cape of Good Hope on extended sick leave. From 1820 to 1821 he administered the Cape Colony with success as acting Governor. He named the rising seaport of Algoa Bay Port Elizabeth in memory of his wife and in August 1820 erected a memorial to her on a hill overlooking Algoa Bay. In 1821 he became lieutenant general and a Knight Grand Cross of the Royal Guelphic Order.

== Post-army ==
The rest of Donkin's life passed in literary and political work. He was one of the original fellows of the Royal Geographical Society, and was a member of the Royal Society and of many other learned bodies. His theories as to the course of the River Niger, published under the title Dissertation on the Course and Probable Termination of the Niger (London, 1829), involved him in a good deal of controversy. From 1832 to 1837 he sat in the House of Commons as Member of Parliament (MP) for Berwick-upon-Tweed, and in 1835 became Surveyor-General of the Ordnance. He was elected as MP for Sandwich in 1839, and held that seat until he committed suicide at Southampton on 1 May 1841. He was then a general, and colonel of the 11th Regiment of Foot.

He is listed as one of the important graves lost on the Burdett-Coutts Memorial Sundial in Old St. Pancras Churchyard in London.

Rufane Donkin's cousin, Charles Collier Michell, served as the surveyor-general of the Cape Colony.

== See also ==
- Donkin Heritage Trail
- Donkin Memorial

Parliament of the United Kingdom
| Preceded by Marcus Beresford; Sir Francis Blake | Member of Parliament for Berwick-upon-Tweed; 1832–1837; With: Sir Francis Blake 1832–1835; James Bradshaw 1835–1837 | Succeeded by Richard Hodgson; William Holmes |
| Preceded by Sir James Rivett-Carnac, Bt; Sir Edward Troubridge, Bt | Member of Parliament for Sandwich; 1839–1841; With: Sir Edward Troubridge, Bt | Succeeded by Hugh Hamilton Lindsay; Sir Edward Troubridge, Bt |
Military offices
| Preceded by Lord Edward Somerset | Surveyor-General of the Ordnance; 1835–1841 | Succeeded by Charles Richard Fox |
| Preceded by Sir Henry Tucker Montresor | Colonel of the 11th (the North Devonshire) Regiment of Foot; 1837–1841 | Succeeded by John Wilson |
| Preceded by Sir Alexander Campbell, 1st Baronet | Colonel of the 80th Regiment of Foot (Staffordshire Volunteers); 1825–1837 | Succeeded by John Taylor |
