= Hilton Philipson =

British politician (1892–1941)

Hilton Philipson (5 November 1892 – 12 April 1941), also known as Hylton Phillipson, was a politician in the United Kingdom.

== Biography ==
Standing as a National Liberal Party candidate, he was elected at the 1922 general election as Member of Parliament (MP) for Berwick-upon-Tweed but the election was overturned on petition. At the resulting by-election, his wife Mabel stood as the Conservative candidate and won. She held the seat until 1929 when she retired.

At the 1923 general election, Hilton Philipson stood as a Conservative in the nearby Wansbeck constituency, but failed to unseat the sitting Labour MP. In 1924 he was defeated again in Gateshead, and did not stand for Parliament again.

He resided at 77 Lancaster Gate in London and at 1 Adelaide Mansions in Hove, East Sussex.

== See also ==
List of United Kingdom MPs with the shortest service

Parliament of the United Kingdom
Preceded by Francis Blake	Member of Parliament for Berwick-upon-Tweed; 1922–1923	Succeeded by Mabel Philipson
