= 1880 Berwick-upon-Tweed by-election =

UK parliamentary by-election

In July 1880, a by-election was held in Berwick-upon-Tweed. The election was triggered by a vacancy caused by Henry Strutt, the Liberal MP, succeeding to the peerage. Strutt had won the seat at the 1880 general election but became Baron Belper upon his father's death in June. Conservative candidate David Milne Home beat Liberal candidate and Lord Advocate John McLaren by a very small margin to regain the seat he had lost at the general election.

== Background ==
Strutt was invited to contest Berwick-upon-Tweed by the Liberal Committee a year before the March 1880 general election. Both Strutt and the other Liberal candidate, Dudley Marjoribanks, were elected to the two available seats as part of an unexpected national swing towards the Liberals. On 30 June 1880, Strutt's father died and Strutt inherited his title, and thus his seat in the House of Lords, disqualifying him from his Commons seat. The writ for a by-election was issued on 6 July and the election was held on 19 July.

The Conservative candidate David Milne Home had previously been an MP for Berwick-upon-Tweed from 1874 to April 1880. The Liberal candidate was John McLaren, the Lord Advocate. McLaren had lost his seat upon seeking re-election after his appointment in April 1880, being defeated by Conservative Mark MacTaggart-Stewart. The Glasgow Herald noted that "[t]here were very fair prospects for the Liberal cause at Berwick" seeing as the two Conservative candidates had come last at the recent general election. However, Home won the contest by two votes, which The Herald attributed to Liberal voters not turning out and better organisation by the Conservatives.

Berwick-upon-Tweed by-election, 1880
Party	Candidate	Votes	%	±%
Conservative	Captain David Milne Home	584	50.10	+6.4
Liberal	Rt. Hon. John McLaren	582	49.90	−6.4
Majority		2	1.20	N/A
Turnout		1,166	80.8	+0.8 (est)
Registered electors		1,443		
Conservative gain from Liberal		Swing	+6.4	
