= James Bradshaw (MP, born 1793) =

British politician (1786-1847)

James Bradshaw MP (31 May 1793 – 4 March 1847) was a British Tory and later Conservative Party politician in the United Kingdom. He sat as Member of Parliament (MP) for Berwick-upon-Tweed from 1835 to 1837 and for Canterbury from 1837 to 1847.

Bradshaw was born 31 May 1793, the son of James Bradshaw and Harriet Fitzhugh. Following his father's death, his mother Harriet became Lady Harriet Peyton when she married Sir Henry Peyton, 2nd Baronet. In 1825, he married the actress Ann Maria Tree, they had one daughter. He died at his home in London on 4 March 1847 after a long and painful illness.

Parliament of the United Kingdom
Preceded by Rufane Shaw Donkin; Sir Francis Blake, Bt	Member of Parliament for Berwick-upon-Tweed; 1835–1837; With: Rufane Shaw Donkin	Succeeded by Richard Hodgson; William Holmes
Preceded by Lord Albert Conyngham; Stephen Rumbold Lushington	Member of Parliament for Canterbury; 1837–1847; With: Lord Albert Conyngham 1837–1841; Hon. George Smythe 1841–1847	Succeeded by Hon. George Smythe; Lord Albert Conyingham
