= Berwick-upon-Tweed (constituency) =

Parliamentary constituency in the United Kingdom, 1885–2024

- Former county constituency for the House of Commons
- 2010–2024 boundary of Berwick-upon-Tweed in Northumberland

- Location of Northumberland within England
- County: Northumberland
- Population: 75,718 (2011 census)
- Electorate: 55,785 (December 2010)
- Major settlements: Alnwick, Berwick-upon-Tweed

1885–2024
- Seats: One
- Replaced by: North Northumberland; Hexham (minor part)

1512–1885
- Seats: Two
- Type of constituency: Borough constituency

Berwick-upon-Tweed (/ˌbɛrɪk-/) was a parliamentary constituency (Note: A county constituency (for the purposes of election expenses and type of returning officer)) in Northumberland represented in the House of Commons of the UK Parliament from 2015 until its abolition for the 2024 general election by Conservative Anne-Marie Trevelyan. (Note: As with all constituencies, the first past the post system of election is used with elections at least every five years.)

It was a parliamentary borough in the county of Northumberland, of the House of Commons of England from 1512 to 1706, then of the House of Commons of Great Britain from 1707 to 1800 and of the House of Commons of the United Kingdom from 1801 to 1885. It returned two Members of Parliament (MPs), elected by the bloc vote system. It was a county constituency from 1885, electing one MP under the first-past-the-post system.

Under the 2023 Periodic Review of Westminster constituencies, the seat was expanded and renamed North Northumberland to reflect the inclusion of the town of Morpeth from the abolished constituency of Wansbeck.

== Profile ==
The constituency of Berwick-upon-Tweed was in the county of Northumberland. It included as its northernmost point the town of Berwick-upon-Tweed and stretched south to include the towns of Alnwick and Amble — the Northumberland coast formed its long eastern boundary. Its length was roughly 50 miles (80 km) and its area 2,310 square kilometres (890 sq mi).

Predominantly rural in character, this constituency is the most northerly in England and is relatively sparsely populated.

== History ==
Berwick had been intermittently represented in Scottish Parliaments but it is thought that it was first enfranchised as an English borough between 1491 and 1512.

It was unaffected by the Reform Act 1832 and continued to elect two MPs until it was abolished by the Redistribution of Seats Act 1885. The 1885 Act re-constituted the constituency as one of four divisions of Northumberland, each electing one MP.

== Boundaries ==
=== 1832–1885 ===
The contents of the parliamentary borough, as defined by the Parliamentary Boundaries Act 1832, were:

The Parish of Berwick, and the Respective Townships of Tweedmouth and Spittal.

=== 1885–1918 ===
The contents of the county division, as defined by the Redistribution of Seats Act 1885, were:

The Sessional Divisions of Bamburgh, Coquetdale East (part), Coquetdale North, Glendale, and Norhamshire and Islandshire; and the Municipal Borough of Berwick-upon-Tweed.

=== 1918–1950 ===
- the Municipal Borough of Berwick upon Tweed
- the Urban Districts of Alnwick, Amble and Rothbury
- the Rural Districts of Alnwick, Belford, Glendale, Norham and Islandshires, and Rothbury.

Gained small areas to south from Wansbeck (Amble) and Hexham (Rothbury).

=== 1950–1983 ===
- the Municipal Borough of Berwick-upon-Tweed;
- the Urban Districts of Alnwick and Amble;
- the Rural Districts of Alnwick, Belford, Glendale, Norham and Islandshires, and Rothbury.

No change (the Urban District of Rothbury had been absorbed into the Rural District).

=== 1983–2024 ===
Map of boundaries 2010–2024

- the District of Alnwick
- the Borough of Berwick-upon-Tweed
- in the Borough of Castle Morpeth, the wards of Chevington, Ellington, Hartburn, Longhorsley, Lynemouth and Ulgham.

Contents changed following reorganisation of local authorities in 1974. The seat was expanded southwards, adding the (rural) wards in Castle Morpeth Borough, previously part of the abolished constituency of Morpeth.

=== 2007 boundary review ===
In the fifth periodic boundary review of parliamentary representation in Northumberland, which came into effect for the 2010 general election, the contents of the existing Berwick constituency were unchanged and the Boundary Commission for England made only minor changes to take account of ward boundary changes. A proposal to rename the historic seat "Berwick-upon-Tweed and Mid Northumberland" was rejected: whilst it is geographically accurate, it was thought unwieldy. (Note: MPs references to each other at least in writing, are entered by a full constituency name in Hansard)

In 2009, a further government reorganisation resulted in the abolition of all local government boroughs and districts in Northumberland and the establishment of the county as a unitary authority. However, this did not affect the constituency boundaries.

=== 2023 boundary review ===
In the 2023 Periodic Review of Westminster constituencies, which came into effect for the 2024 general election, the constituency was abolished and replaced by re-established North Northumberland constituency.

== Political history ==
Rural in nature, sparse of population and with agriculture as a major source of employment, Berwick-upon-Tweed never elected a Labour candidate, one of two constituencies in the north-east of England not to have done so. The closest Labour came to winning the seat was at the 1966 general election, where they finished just 4,373 votes behind incumbent Conservative MP Antony Lambton.

The area was notable for its Liberal traditions, with politicians such as Sir William Beveridge (influential in the formation of the National Health Service) and Edward Grey (Foreign Secretary at the beginning of World War I, best remembered for the "lamps are going out all over Europe...." remark) have served this constituency.

It was represented by Liberal Democrat Sir Alan Beith from 1973 (formerly Liberal) until his retirement in 2015, when it was gained by the Conservative candidate Anne-Marie Trevelyan. Beith was first elected at a by-election, required as a result of the resignation of the then incumbent MP Antony Lambton (Conservative), who had been caught up in a scandal involving call girls, marijuana and a tabloid newspaper.

In 1923, Mabel Philipson, a former music hall actress, took over the seat as a Conservative, when her husband was forced to resign. In doing so she became only the third female MP to sit in the House of Commons since female members became legal five years previously.

== Members of Parliament ==
The seat has sent members to Parliament since its enfranchisement by Henry VIII. It initially sent two members; this was reduced to one in 1885.

=== MPs before 1660 ===
Parliament	First member	Second member
1510–1523	No names known	
1529	John Martin	John Cooper, died and replaced after 1532 by ?John Uvedale
1536	?	
1539	Odinel Selby	?
1542	?	
1545	?	
1547	Odinel Selby	John Watson
1553 (Mar)	?	
1553 (Oct)	?	
1554 (Apr)	George Browne	Odinel Selby
1554 (Nov)	?	
1555	Thomas Bradford	Charles Wharton
1558	?	
1562–3	Anthony Temple	Thomas Norton
1571	Sir Valentine Browne	Henry Carey
1572	Martin Garnett	Robert Newdigate
1584	William Morton	Thomas Parkinson
1586 (Oct)	Sir Valentine Browne	
1589 (Jan)	William Morton	William Selby
1593	William Morton	William Selby
1597 (Oct)	William Selby	Thomas Parkinson
1601	William Selby	David Waterhouse
1604	Sir William Selby	Christopher Parkinson
1614	Sir John Selby	Meredith Morgan
1621	Sir John Selby	Sir Robert Jackson
1624	Sir Robert Jackson	Edward Lively
1625	Sir Robert Jackson	Sir John Selby
1626	Sir Robert Jackson	Richard Lowther
1628	Sir Edmund Sawyer	Edward Liveley
1629–1640	No Parliaments convened	
1640 (Apr)	Sir Thomas Widdrington	Hugh Potter
1640 (Nov)	Sir Thomas Widdrington	Robert Scawen
1645	Sir Thomas Widdrington	Robert Scawen
1648	Sir Thomas Widdrington	Robert Scawen
1653	Berwick not represented in Barebones Parliament	
1654	George Fenwick	Only one representative in 1st Protectorate Parliament
1656	George Fenwick, died 1657 and replaced by John Rushworth	Only one representative in 2nd Protectorate Parliament
1659	John Rushworth	George Payler

=== MPs 1660–1885 ===
Year	First member	First party	Second member	Second party
April 1660	Sir Thomas Widdrington		John Rushworth	
June 1660	Edward Grey		John Rushworth	
1661	Edward Grey		Sir Thomas Widdrington	
1665	Edward Grey		Daniel Collingwood	
1677	Viscount Osborne		Daniel Collingwood	
1679	Ralph Grey	Whig	John Rushworth	Whig
1685	Philip Bickerstaffe	Tory	Ralph Widdrington	Tory
1689	Francis Blake	Whig	Philip Babington	Whig
1690	Francis Blake	Whig	Samuel Ogle	
1695	Ralph Grey	Whig	Samuel Ogle	
1698	Sir Francis Blake	Whig	Samuel Ogle	
January 1701	Ralph Grey	Whig	Samuel Ogle	
December 1701	Sir Francis Blake	Whig	Samuel Ogle	
1702	Jonathan Hutchinson		Samuel Ogle	
1710	Jonathan Hutchinson		William Kerr	
1711	Richard Hampden		William Kerr	
1713	Richard Hampden		William Orde	
1715	Grey Neville	Whig	John Barrington	
March 1723	Grey Neville	Whig	Henry Grey	Whig
May 1723	William Kerr		Henry Grey	Whig
1727	George Liddell		Joseph Sabine	
1734	George Liddell		Viscount Polwarth	
March 1740	George Liddell		The Viscount Barrington	
November 1740	Thomas Watson	Tory	The Viscount Barrington	
1754	Thomas Watson	Tory	John Delaval	Tory
1761	Thomas Watson	Tory	Col. John Craufurd	
January 1765	Thomas Watson	Tory	Sir John Delaval, Bt	
December 1765	Wilmot Vaughan		Sir John Delaval, Bt	
1768	Robert Paris Taylor		Sir John Delaval, Bt	
1774	Jacob Wilkinson	Tory	John Vaughan	Tory
1780	Sir John Delaval, Bt	Tory	John Vaughan	Tory
1787	Sir Gilbert Elliot, Bt	Whig	John Vaughan	Tory
1790	Charles Carpenter	Tory	John Vaughan	Tory
1795	Charles Carpenter	Tory	John Callender	Tory
1796	The Earl of Tyrconnel	Tory	John Callender	Tory
1802	Thomas Hall	Tory	John Fordyce	Tory
1803	Francis Sitwell	Tory	Alexander Allan	Tory
1806	Sir John Callender, Bt	Tory	Alexander Tower	Whig
1807	Alexander Allan	Tory	Sir Alexander Lockhart, Bt	Tory
1812	Alexander Allan	Tory	Henry St Paul	Tory
March 1820	Viscount Ossulston	Whig	Sir David Milne	Tory
July 1820	Viscount Ossulston	Whig	Henry St Paul	Tory
December 1820	Viscount Ossulston	Whig	Sir Francis Blake, Bt	Whig
1823	Sir John Beresford, Bt	Tory	Sir Francis Blake, Bt	Whig
1826	Marcus Beresford	Tory	John Gladstone	Tory
1827	Marcus Beresford	Tory	Sir Francis Blake, Bt	Whig
1832	Sir Rufane Shaw Donkin	Whig	Sir Francis Blake, Bt	Whig
1835	Sir Rufane Shaw Donkin	Whig	James Bradshaw	Conservative
1837	Richard Hodgson	Conservative	William Holmes	Conservative
1841	Richard Hodgson	Conservative	Matthew Forster	Whig
1847	John Campbell Renton	Conservative	Matthew Forster	Whig
1852	John Stapleton	Radical	Matthew Forster	Whig
1853	Dudley Marjoribanks	Whig	John Forster	Whig
1857	Dudley Marjoribanks	Whig	John Stapleton	Radical
May 1859	Charles William Gordon	Conservative	Ralph Earle	Conservative
August 1859	Charles William Gordon	Conservative	Dudley Marjoribanks	Liberal
1863	William Cargill	Conservative	Dudley Marjoribanks	Liberal
1865	Alexander Mitchell	Liberal	Dudley Marjoribanks	Liberal
1868	Viscount Bury	Liberal	John Stapleton	Liberal
1874	Dudley Marjoribanks	Liberal	David Milne Home	Conservative
1880	Dudley Marjoribanks	Liberal	Henry Strutt	Liberal
1880 by-election	Dudley Marjoribanks	Liberal	David Milne Home	Conservative
1881 by-election	Hubert Jerningham	Liberal	David Milne Home	Conservative
1885	Redistribution of Seats Act: membership reduced to one			

=== MPs since 1885 ===
Election	Member	Party
1885	Edward Grey	Liberal
1916 by-election	Francis Blake	Liberal
Dec 1916	Francis Blake	Coalition Liberal
Jan 1922	Francis Blake	National Liberal
Nov 1922	Hilton Philipson	National Liberal
1923 by-election	Mabel Philipson	Conservative
1929	Alfred Todd	Conservative
1935	Hugh Seely	Liberal
1941 by-election	George Grey	Liberal
1944 by-election	William Beveridge	Liberal
1945	Robert Thorp	Conservative
1951	Antony Lambton	Conservative
1973 by-election	Sir Alan Beith	Liberal
1988	Sir Alan Beith	Liberal Democrats
2015	Anne-Marie Trevelyan	Conservative
2024	constituency abolished: see North Northumberland	

== Elections ==
2010s – 2000s – 1990s – 1980s – 1970s – 1960s – 1950s – 1940s – 1930s – 1920s – 1910s – 1900s – 1890s – 1880s – 1832 to 1880

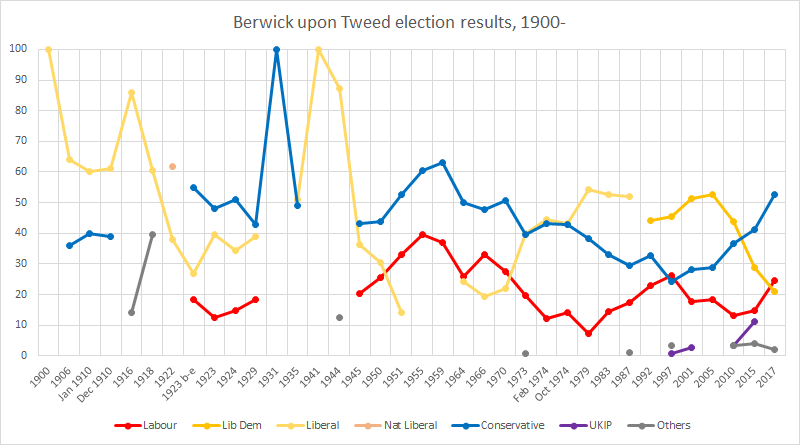
Berwick election results

=== Elections in the 2010s ===
General election 2019: Berwick-upon-Tweed
Party	Candidate	Votes	%	±%
Conservative	Anne-Marie Trevelyan	23,947	56.9	+4.4
Labour	Trish Williams	9,112	21.6	−3.0
Liberal Democrats	Tom Hancock	7,656	18.2	−2.9
Green	Thomas Stewart	1,394	3.3	+1.4
Majority		14,835	35.3	+7.4
Turnout		42,109	70.3	−1.5
Conservative hold		Swing	+3.7	

General election 2017: Berwick-upon-Tweed
Party	Candidate	Votes	%	±%
Conservative	Anne-Marie Trevelyan	22,145	52.5	+11.4
Labour	Scott Dickinson	10,364	24.6	+9.7
Liberal Democrats	Julie Pörksen	8,916	21.1	−7.8
Green	Thomas Stewart	787	1.9	−1.8
Majority		11,781	27.9	+15.7
Turnout		42,212	71.8	+0.8
Conservative hold		Swing	+0.9	

General election 2015: Berwick-upon-Tweed
Party	Candidate	Votes	%	±%
Conservative	Anne-Marie Trevelyan	16,603	41.1	+4.4
Liberal Democrats	Julie Pörksen	11,689	28.9	−14.8
Labour	Scott Dickinson	6,042	14.9	+1.7
UKIP	Nigel Coghill-Marshall	4,513	11.2	+8.0
Green	Rachael Roberts	1,488	3.7	New
English Democrat	Neil Humphrey	88	0.2	New
Majority		4,914	12.2	N/A
Turnout		40,423	71.0	+4.0
Conservative gain from Liberal Democrats		Swing	+9.6	

General election 2010: Berwick-upon-Tweed
Party	Candidate	Votes	%	±%
Liberal Democrats	Alan Beith	16,806	43.7	−8.9
Conservative	Anne-Marie Trevelyan	14,116	36.7	+7.7
Labour	Alan Strickland	5,061	13.2	−5.2
UKIP	Mick Weatheritt	1,243	3.2	New
BNP	Peter Mailer	1,213	3.2	New
Majority		2,690	7.0	−16.3
Turnout		38,439	67.0	+3.7
Liberal Democrats hold		Swing	-8.3	

Back to elections

=== Elections in the 2000s ===
General election 2005: Berwick-upon-Tweed
Party	Candidate	Votes	%	±%
Liberal Democrats	Alan Beith	19,052	52.8	+1.4
Conservative	Mike Elliott	10,420	28.9	+0.8
Labour	Glen Reynolds	6,618	18.3	+0.6
Majority		8,632	23.9	+0.6
Turnout		36,090	63.4	−0.4
Liberal Democrats hold		Swing	+0.3	

General election 2001: Berwick-upon-Tweed
Party	Candidate	Votes	%	±%
Liberal Democrats	Alan Beith	18,651	51.4	+5.9
Conservative	Glen Sanderson	10,193	28.1	+4.0
Labour	Martin Walker	6,435	17.7	−8.5
UKIP	John Pearson	1,029	2.8	+2.0
Majority		8,458	23.3	+4.0
Turnout		36,308	63.8	−9.7
Liberal Democrats hold		Swing	+1.0	

Back to elections

=== Elections in the 1990s ===
General election 1997: Berwick-upon-Tweed
Party	Candidate	Votes	%	±%
Liberal Democrats	Alan Beith	19,007	45.5	+1.1
Labour	Paul Brannen	10,965	26.2	+3.4
Conservative	Nick Herbert	10,058	24.1	−8.7
Referendum	Ned Lambton	1,423	3.4	New
UKIP	Ian Dodds	352	0.8	New
Majority		8,042	19.3	+8.7
Turnout		41,805	73.5	−5.6
Liberal Democrats hold		Swing	-2.3	

General election 1992: Berwick-upon-Tweed
Party	Candidate	Votes	%	±%
Liberal Democrats	Alan Beith	19,283	44.4	−7.7
Conservative	Anthony Henfrey	14,240	32.8	+3.3
Labour	Gordon Adam	9,933	22.8	+5.3
Majority		5,043	11.6	−11.0
Turnout		43,456	79.1	+1.8
Liberal Democrats hold		Swing	-5.5	

Back to elections

=== Elections in the 1980s ===
General election 1987: Berwick-upon-Tweed
Party	Candidate	Votes	%	±%
Liberal	Alan Beith	21,903	52.1	−0.6
Conservative	John Middleton	12,400	29.5	−3.5
Labour	Stephen Lambert	7,360	17.5	+3.2
Green	Nigel Pamphilion	379	0.9	New
Majority		9,503	22.6	+2.9
Turnout		42,042	77.3	−0.5
Liberal hold		Swing	+1.4	

General election 1983: Berwick-upon-Tweed
Party	Candidate	Votes	%	±%
Liberal	Alan Beith	21,958	52.7	−1.6
Conservative	Julian Brazier	13,743	33.0	−5.4
Labour	Vera Baird	5,975	14.3	+7.0
Majority		8,215	19.7	+3.7
Turnout		41,676	77.8	−6.0
Liberal hold		Swing	+1.9	

Back to elections

=== Elections in the 1970s ===
General election 1979: Berwick-upon-Tweed
Party	Candidate	Votes	%	±%
Liberal	Alan Beith	19,351	54.34	+11.23
Conservative	Charles Baker-Cresswell	13,663	38.36	−4.53
Labour	G. M. Elliott	2,602	7.31	−6.69
Majority		5,688	15.98	+15.76
Turnout		35,616	83.82	−1.32
Liberal hold		Swing	+7.88	

General election October 1974: Berwick-upon-Tweed
Party	Candidate	Votes	%	±%
Liberal	Alan Beith	14,684	43.11	−1.40
Conservative	Charles Baker-Cresswell	14,611	42.89	−0.36
Labour	G. Spain	4,768	14.00	+1.76
Majority		73	0.22	−1.04
Turnout		34,063	81.37	−3.8
Liberal hold		Swing	-0.52	

General election February 1974: Berwick-upon-Tweed
Party	Candidate	Votes	%	±%
Liberal	Alan Beith	15,732	44.51	+22.56
Conservative	John Donald Morrison Hardie	15,289	43.25	−7.41
Labour	Gordon Adam	4,326	12.24	−15.15
Majority		443	1.26	N/A
Turnout		35,347	85.14	+10.1
Liberal hold		Swing		

1973 Berwick-upon-Tweed by-election
Party	Candidate	Votes	%	±%
Liberal	Alan Beith	12,489	39.9	+18.0
Conservative	John Donald Morrison Hardie	12,432	39.7	−11.0
Labour	Gordon Adam	6,178	19.8	−7.6
Independent	T. G. Symonds	126	0.4	New
Independent	Robert Goodall	72	0.2	New
Majority		57	0.2	N/A
Turnout		31,297	75.00	+1.4
Registered electors		41,721		
Liberal gain from Conservative		Swing	+14.5	

General election 1970: Berwick-upon-Tweed
Party	Candidate	Votes	%	±%
Conservative	Antony Lambton	15,558	50.66	+3.1
Labour Co-op	Bob Wareing	8,413	27.39	−5.7
Liberal	Alan Beith	6,741	21.95	+2.6
Majority		7,145	23.27	+8.7
Turnout		30,712	73.60	−2.98
Registered electors		41,731		
Conservative hold		Swing	+4.6	

Back to elections

=== Elections in the 1960s ===
General election 1966: Berwick-upon-Tweed
Party	Candidate	Votes	%	±%
Conservative	Antony Lambton	14,281	47.63	−2.29
Labour	James W. Conway	9,908	33.04	+7.16
Liberal	Aubrey Herbert	5,796	19.33	−4.86
Majority		4,373	14.59	−9.45
Turnout		31,750	76.58	−2.96
Registered electors		39,155		
Conservative hold		Swing	-2.43	

General election 1964: Berwick-upon-Tweed
Party	Candidate	Votes	%	±%
Conservative	Antony Lambton	15,851	49.92	−13.19
Labour	R. Christopher Jelley	8,218	25.88	−11.01
Liberal	Nicholas B. Madison	7,681	24.19	New
Majority		7,633	24.04	−2.18
Turnout		31,750	79.54	+2.52
Registered electors		39,915		
Conservative hold		Swing	-1.09	

Back to elections

=== Elections in the 1950s ===
General election 1959: Berwick-upon-Tweed
Party	Candidate	Votes	%	±%
Conservative	Antony Lambton	19,904	63.11	+2.76
Labour	R. Christopher Jelley	11,637	36.89	−2.76
Majority		8,267	26.22	+5.52
Turnout		31,541	77.02	+4.24
Registered electors		40,951		
Conservative hold		Swing	+2.76	

General election 1955: Berwick-upon-Tweed
Party	Candidate	Votes	%	±%
Conservative	Antony Lambton	18,301	60.35	+7.65
Labour	John Frater	12,024	39.65	+6.57
Majority		6,277	20.70	+1.08
Turnout		30,325	72.78	−6.06
Registered electors		41,664		
Conservative hold		Swing	+0.54	

General election 1951: Berwick-upon-Tweed
Party	Candidate	Votes	%	±%
Conservative	Antony Lambton	17,632	52.70	+8.79
Labour Co-op	Thomas H. Jones	11,069	33.08	+7.42
Liberal	John Beeching Frankenburg	4,759	14.22	−16.19
Majority		6,563	19.62	+6.14
Turnout		33,460	78.84	−1.29
Registered electors		42,438		
Conservative hold		Swing		

General election 1950: Berwick-upon-Tweed
Party	Candidate	Votes	%	±%
Conservative	Robert Thorp	14,804	43.91	+0.62
Liberal	Arthur Comyns Carr	10,260	30.43	−5.96
Labour	John Davis	8,651	25.66	+5.34
Majority		4,544	13.48	+6.58
Turnout		33,715	80.13	+12.36
Registered electors		42,075		
Conservative hold		Swing	+3.29	

Back to elections

=== Elections in the 1940s ===
General election 1945: Berwick-upon-Tweed
Party	Candidate	Votes	%	±%
Conservative	Robert Thorp	12,315	43.29	N/A
Liberal	William Beveridge	10,353	36.39	N/A
Labour	John Davis	5,782	20.32	New
Majority		1,962	6.90	N/A
Turnout		28,450	67.77	−8.23
Conservative gain from Liberal		Swing		

1944 Berwick-upon-Tweed by-election
Party	Candidate	Votes	%	±%
Liberal	William Beveridge	8,792	87.4	+36.4
Independent	W. D. Clark	1,269	12.6	New
Majority		7,523	74.8	+72.8
Turnout		10,061	24.5	−51.5
Registered electors		41,068		
Liberal hold		Swing		

1941 Berwick-upon-Tweed by-election
Party	Candidate	Votes	%	±%
Liberal	George Charles Grey	Unopposed		
Liberal hold				

Back to elections

=== Elections in the 1930s ===
General election 1935: Berwick-upon-Tweed
Party	Candidate	Votes	%	±%
Liberal	Hugh Seely	15,779	51.0	New
Conservative	Alfred Todd	15,145	49.0	N/A
Majority		634	2.0	N/A
Turnout		30,924	76.0	N/A
Liberal gain from Conservative		Swing		

General election 1931: Berwick-upon-Tweed
Party	Candidate	Votes	%	±%
Conservative	Alfred Todd	Unopposed		
Conservative hold				

Back to elections

=== Elections in the 1920s ===
General election 1929: Berwick-upon-Tweed
Party	Candidate	Votes	%	±%
Unionist	Alfred Todd	12,526	42.8	−8.1
Liberal	Penry Williams	11,372	38.8	+4.5
Labour	Henry Kegie	5,402	18.4	+3.6
Majority		1,154	4.0	−12.6
Turnout		29,300	76.1	−1.6
Unionist hold		Swing	-6.3	

General election 1924: Berwick-upon-Tweed
Party	Candidate	Votes	%	±%
Unionist	Mabel Philipson	12,130	50.9	+2.9
Liberal	Harold Burge Robson	8,165	34.3	−5.2
Labour	J. Adams	3,521	14.8	+2.3
Majority		3,965	16.6	+8.1
Turnout		23,816	77.7	+4.3
Unionist hold		Swing	+4.0	

General election 1923: Berwick-upon-Tweed
Party	Candidate	Votes	%	±%
Unionist	Mabel Philipson	10,636	48.0	−7.0
Liberal	Harold Burge Robson	8,767	39.5	+12.7
Labour	Edna Martha Penny	2,784	12.5	−5.7
Majority		1,869	8.5	−19.7
Turnout		22,187	73.4	−1.5
Unionist hold		Swing	-9.9	

1923 Berwick-upon-Tweed by-election
Party	Candidate	Votes	%	±%
Unionist	Mabel Philipson	12,000	55.0	New
Liberal	Harold Burge Robson	5,858	26.8	−11.3
Labour	Gilbert Oliver	3,966	18.2	New
Majority		6,142	28.2	+4.4
Turnout		21,824	74.9	+8.7
Unionist gain from National Liberal		Swing	N/A	

General election 1922: Berwick-upon-Tweed (void)
Party	Candidate	Votes	%	±%
National Liberal	Hilton Philipson	11,933	61.9	+1.4
Liberal	Walter Runciman	7,354	38.1	N/A
Majority		4,579	23.8	N/A
Turnout		19,287	66.2	
Registered electors				
National Liberal hold		Swing		

Back to elections

=== Elections in the 1910s ===
General election 1918: Berwick-upon-Tweed
Party	Candidate	Votes	%
National Liberal	Francis Blake	6,721	60.5
Independent	William Watson-Armstrong	4,397	39.5
Majority		2,324	21.0
Turnout		11,118	
Registered electors			
National Liberal win (new boundaries)			

1916 Berwick-upon-Tweed by-election Electorate 9,454
Party	Candidate	Votes	%	±%
Liberal	Francis Blake	3,794	85.9	+24.7
Independent	Arthur Turnbull	621	14.1	New
Majority		3,173	71.8	+49.4
Turnout		4,415	46.7	−33.1
Registered electors		9,454		
Liberal hold		Swing	N/A	

General election December 1910: Berwick-upon-Tweed Electorate 9,420
Party	Candidate	Votes	%	±%
Liberal	Edward Grey	4,612	61.2	+1.1
Conservative	Charles Henry Hoare	2,926	38.8	−1.1
Majority		1,686	22.4	+2.2
Turnout		7,538	79.8	−8.5
Registered electors		9,445		
Liberal hold		Swing	+1.1	

General election January 1910: Berwick-upon-Tweed
Party	Candidate	Votes	%	±%
Liberal	Edward Grey	5,010	60.1	−4.0
Conservative	Thomas Inskip	3,327	39.9	+4.0
Majority		1,683	20.2	−8.0
Turnout		8,337	88.3	+2.8
Registered electors		9,445		
Liberal hold		Swing	−4.0	

Back to elections

=== Elections in the 1900s ===
General election 1906: Berwick-upon-Tweed
Party	Candidate	Votes	%	±%
Liberal	Edward Grey	5,102	64.1	N/A
Conservative	Thomas Inskip	2,862	35.9	New
Majority		2,240	28.2	N/A
Turnout		7,964	85.5	N/A
Registered electors		9,316		
Liberal hold		Swing	N/A	

General election 1900: Berwick-upon-Tweed
Party	Candidate	Votes	%	±%
Liberal	Edward Grey	Unopposed		
Liberal hold				

Back to elections

=== Elections in the 1890s ===
Sir Edward Grey

General election 1895: Berwick-upon-Tweed
Party	Candidate	Votes	%	±%
Liberal	Edward Grey	4,378	54.9	+2.0
Conservative	Henry Percy	3,593	45.1	−2.0
Majority		785	9.8	+4.0
Turnout		7,971	85.9	+3.2
Registered electors		9,277		
Liberal hold		Swing	+2.0	

General election 1892: Berwick-upon-Tweed
Party	Candidate	Votes	%	±%
Liberal	Edward Grey	4,002	52.9	−1.9
Conservative	Watson Askew-Robertson	3,560	47.1	+1.9
Majority		442	5.8	−3.8
Turnout		7,562	82.7	+4.9
Registered electors		9,141		
Liberal hold		Swing	−1.9	

Back to elections

=== Elections in the 1880s ===
General election 1886: Berwick-upon-Tweed
Party	Candidate	Votes	%	±%
Liberal	Edward Grey	4,131	54.8	−2.9
Liberal Unionist	Frederick Lambton	3,407	45.2	+2.9
Majority		724	9.6	−5.8
Turnout		7,538	77.8	−10.3
Registered electors		9,691		
Liberal hold		Swing	−2.9	

General election 1885: Berwick-upon-Tweed
Party	Candidate	Votes	%	±%
Liberal	Edward Grey	4,929	57.7	+1.4
Conservative	Henry Percy	3,613	42.3	−1.4
Majority		1,316	15.4	+12.7
Turnout		8,542	88.1	+8.1 (est)
Registered electors		9,691		
Liberal hold		Swing	+1.4	

By-election, 26 Oct 1881: Berwick-upon-Tweed
Party	Candidate	Votes	%	±%
Liberal	Hubert Jerningham	1,046	66.4	+10.1
Conservative	Henry John Trotter	529	33.6	−10.1
Majority		517	32.8	+30.1
Turnout		1,575	79.2	−0.8 (est)
Registered electors		1,989		
Liberal hold		Swing	+10.1	

- Caused by Marjoribanks elevation to the peerage, becoming Lord Tweedmouth.

By-election, 21 Jul 1880: Berwick-upon-Tweed
Party	Candidate	Votes	%	±%
Conservative	David Milne Home	584	50.1	+6.4
Liberal	John McLaren	582	49.9	−6.4
Majority		2	0.2	N/A
Turnout		1,166	80.8	+0.8 (est)
Registered electors		1,443		
Conservative gain from Liberal		Swing	+6.4	

- Caused by Strutt's elevation to the peerage, becoming Lord Belper.

General election 1880: Berwick-upon-Tweed
Party	Candidate	Votes	%	±%
Liberal	✓ Dudley Marjoribanks	687	29.7	−2.8
Liberal	✓ Henry Strutt	614	26.6	+4.6
Conservative	William Macdonald Macdonald	552	23.9	N/A
Conservative	David Milne Home	457	19.8	−8.3
Majority		62	2.7	−1.7
Turnout		1,155 (est)	80.0 (est)	−12.6
Registered electors		1,443		
Liberal hold		Swing	+0.7	
Liberal gain from Conservative		Swing	+4.4	

Back to elections

=== Elections from 1832 to 1880 ===
General election 1874: Berwick-upon-Tweed
Party	Candidate	Votes	%	±%
Liberal	✓ Dudley Marjoribanks	617	32.5	N/A
Conservative	✓ David Milne Home	533	28.1	−14.1
Liberal	John Stapleton	418	22.0	−5.6
Liberal	William Keppel	330	17.4	−12.9
Turnout		1,216 (est)	92.6 (est)	+14.5
Registered electors		1,313		
Majority		84	4.4	−0.2
Liberal hold		Swing	N/A	
Majority		115	6.1	N/A
Conservative gain from Liberal		Swing	−2.1	

General election 1868: Berwick-upon-Tweed
Party	Candidate	Votes	%	±%
Liberal	✓ William Keppel	669	30.3	+0.4
Liberal	✓ John Stapleton	609	27.6	−0.1
Conservative	George Wallace Carpenter	508	23.0	+0.8
Conservative	Richard Hodgson	424	19.2	−1.0
Majority		101	4.6	−0.9
Turnout		1,105 (est)	78.1 (est)	−12.6
Registered electors		1,415		
Liberal hold		Swing	−0.2	
Liberal hold		Swing	+0.5	

General election 1865: Berwick-upon-Tweed
Party	Candidate	Votes	%	±%
Liberal	✓ Dudley Marjoribanks	396	29.9	+4.5
Liberal	✓ Alexander Mitchell	367	27.7	+7.9
Conservative	William Cargill	295	22.2	−5.9
Conservative	Joseph Hubback	268	20.2	−6.5
Majority		72	5.5	N/A
Turnout		663 (est)	90.7 (est)	+8.4
Registered electors		731		
Liberal gain from Conservative		Swing	+5.4	
Liberal gain from Conservative		Swing	+7.1	

By-election, 29 Jun 1863: Berwick-upon-Tweed
Party	Candidate	Votes	%	±%
Conservative	✓ William Cargill	328	51.4	−3.4
Liberal	Alexander Mitchell	310	48.6	+3.4
Majority		18	2.8	−5.3
Turnout		638	79.8	−2.5
Registered electors		799		
Conservative hold		Swing	−3.4	

- Caused by Gordon's death.

By-election, 20 August 1859: Berwick-upon-Tweed
Party	Candidate	Votes	%	±%
Liberal	✓ Dudley Marjoribanks	305	50.1	+4.9
Conservative	Richard Hodgson	304	49.9	−4.9
Majority		1	0.2	N/A
Turnout		609	77.1	−5.2
Registered electors		790		
Liberal gain from Conservative		Swing	+4.9	

- Caused by Earle's resignation.

General election 1859: Berwick-upon-Tweed
Party	Candidate	Votes	%	±%
Conservative	✓ Charles William Gordon	366	28.1	+16.2
Conservative	✓ Ralph Earle	348	26.7	+14.8
Liberal	Dudley Marjoribanks	330	25.4	+1.4
Liberal	John Stapleton	257	19.8	−10.2
Majority		109	8.3	N/A
Turnout		651 (est)	82.3 (est)	+12.2
Registered electors		790		
Conservative gain from Liberal		Swing	+10.3	
Conservative gain from Liberal		Swing	+9.6	

General election 1857: Berwick-upon-Tweed
Party	Candidate	Votes	%	±%
Radical	✓ John Stapleton	339	30.0	+2.3
Whig	✓ Dudley Marjoribanks	271	24.0	−15.1
Conservative	Charles William Gordon	269	23.8	−14.4
Whig	Matthew Forster	250	22.1	−10.1
Turnout		565 (est)	70.1 (est)	−7.2
Registered electors		805		
Majority		68	7.9	+1.0
Radical hold		Swing	+4.8	
Majority		2	0.2	−16.5
Whig hold		Swing	N/A	

By-election, 14 May 1853: Berwick-upon-Tweed
Party	Candidate	Votes	%	±%
Whig	✓ Dudley Marjoribanks	473	39.1	+5.0
Whig	✓ John Forster	385	31.8	+4.1
Conservative	John Campbell Renton	196	16.2	−4.6
Conservative	Richard Hodgson	157	13.0	−4.4
Majority		189	15.6	+8.7
Turnout		606 (est)	71.0 (est)	−6.3
Registered electors		853		
Whig hold		Swing	+4.8	
Whig gain from Radical		Swing	+4.3	

- Caused by the 1852 election being declared void on petition, due to bribery.

General election 1852: Berwick-upon-Tweed
Party	Candidate	Votes	%	±%
Whig	✓ Matthew Forster	412	34.1	−10.0
Radical	✓ John Stapleton	335	27.7	N/A
Conservative	John Campbell Renton	251	20.8	−21.4
Conservative	Richard Hodgson	210	17.4	+3.6
Turnout		604 (est)	77.3 (est)	+15.5
Registered electors		805		
Majority		202	16.7	−13.6
Whig hold		Swing	−0.6	
Majority		84	6.9	N/A
Radical gain from Conservative		Swing	N/A	

General election 1847: Berwick-upon-Tweed
Party	Candidate	Votes	%	±%
Whig	✓ Matthew Forster	484	44.1	+7.3
Conservative	✓ John Campbell Renton	463	42.2	+10.2
Conservative	William Henry Miller	151	13.8	−17.5
Majority		333	30.3	+24.8
Turnout		549 (est)	61.8 (est)	−28.5
Registered electors		888		
Whig hold		Swing	+7.3	
Conservative hold		Swing	+3.3	

General election 1841: Berwick-upon-Tweed
Party	Candidate	Votes	%	±%
Whig	✓ Matthew Forster	394	36.8	+5.2
Conservative	✓ Richard Hodgson	343	32.0	−2.4
Conservative	Thomas Weeding	335	31.3	−2.8
Majority		59	5.5	N/A
Turnout		645	90.3	+1.8
Registered electors		714		
Whig gain from Conservative		Swing	+5.2	
Conservative hold		Swing	−2.5	

General election 1837: Berwick-upon-Tweed
Party	Candidate	Votes	%	±%
Conservative	✓ Richard Hodgson	357	34.4	+15.7
Conservative	✓ William Holmes	354	34.1	+15.4
Whig	Rufane Shaw Donkin	328	31.6	−31.0
Majority		26	2.5	N/A
Turnout		625	88.5	−2.6
Registered electors		706		
Conservative hold		Swing	+15.6	
Conservative gain from Whig		Swing	+15.5	

By-election, 27 April 1835: Berwick-upon-Tweed
Party	Candidate	Votes	%	±%
Whig	✓ Rufane Shaw Donkin	Unopposed		
Whig hold				

- Caused by Donkin's appointment as Surveyor-General of the Ordnance

General election 1835: Berwick-upon-Tweed
Party	Candidate	Votes	%	±%
Conservative	✓ James Bradshaw	410	37.4	+5.2
Whig	✓ Rufane Shaw Donkin	350	31.9	−2.7
Whig	Francis Blake	337	30.7	−2.6
Majority		73	6.7	N/A
Turnout		627	91.1	−1.5
Registered electors		688		
Conservative gain from Whig		Swing	+5.3	
Whig hold		Swing	−2.7	

General election 1832: Berwick-upon-Tweed
Party	Candidate	Votes	%	±%
Whig	✓ Rufane Shaw Donkin	371	34.6	+9.9
Whig	✓ Francis Blake	357	33.3	+8.5
Tory	Marcus Beresford	345	32.2	−18.2
Majority		12	1.1	+0.6
Turnout		653	92.6	
Registered electors		705		
Whig hold		Swing	+9.4	
Whig gain from Tory		Swing	+8.8	

=== Elections before 1832 ===
General election 1831: Berwick-upon-Tweed
Party	Candidate	Votes	%	±%
Whig	✓ Francis Blake	299	49.7	+14.9
Tory	✓ Marcus Beresford	296	49.2	+1.9
Tory	Samuel Swinton	7	1.2	−16.7
Majority		3	0.5	−16.4
Turnout		366		
Whig hold		Swing	+14.9	
Tory hold		Swing	−2.8	

General election 1830: Berwick-upon-Tweed
Party	Candidate	Votes	%	±%
Tory	✓ Marcus Beresford	387	47.3	
Whig	✓ Francis Blake	285	34.8	
Tory	Frederick Gye	147	17.9	
Turnout		427		
Majority		102	12.5	
Tory hold		Swing		
Majority		138	16.9	N/A
Whig gain from Tory		Swing		

Back to elections

== See also ==
- List of parliamentary constituencies in Northumberland
- History of parliamentary constituencies and boundaries in Northumberland

== Sources ==
- "politics.co.uk". Berwick-upon-Tweed: Big seat, big issues. Archived from the original on 22 April 2005.
- "BBC". BBC News – Vote 2001 – Results & Constituency – Berwick-upon-Tweed.
- "Women in the house of commons" (PDF). House of Commons Factsheet. Archived from the original (PDF) on 18 May 2005.
- "Burton Mail". Todd reveals his expenses claim.
- "Constituencies in the unreformed House". David Boothroyd Page. Archived from the original on 5 November 2007.
- Robert Beatson, A Chronological Register of Both Houses of Parliament (London: Longman, Hurst, Res & Orme, 1807) A Chronological Register of Both Houses of the British Parliament, from the Union in 1708, to the Third Parliament of the United Kingdom of Great Britain and Ireland, in 1807
