= Robert Jackson (Berwick-upon-Tweed MP) =

English politician

Sir Robert Jackson (c. 1584 – 1645) was an English politician who sat in the House of Commons from 1621 to 1626.

Jackson was of County Durham. He matriculated at St Alban Hall, Oxford on 12 June 1601, aged 16 and was awarded BA on 4 February 1605 and MA on 20 January 1608. He was knighted on 13 May 1617. He was an alderman at Berwick-upon-Tweed. In 1621, he was elected Member of Parliament for Berwick upon Tweed. He was re-elected MP for Berwick upon Tweed in 1624, 1625 and 1626.

Jackson died at the age of about 60 and was buried on 29 January 1645.

Parliament of England
Preceded by Sir John Selby; Meredith Morgan	Member of Parliament for Berwick upon Tweed; 1621–1626; With: Sir John Selby; Edward Lively; Sir John Selby; Richard Lowther	Succeeded by Sir Edward Sawyer; Edward Lively
