= Donkin Memorial =

Four-sided stone pyramid in South Africa

Coordinates: 33°57′43″S 25°37′14″E

The Donkin Memorial is a four-sided stone pyramid located in the Donkin Reserve, central Gqeberha, South Africa. It was constructed at the behest of Sir Rufane Donkin (acting governor of the Cape 1820–1821) in memory of his wife Elizabeth Donkin née Markam, who died in India in 1818. The pyramid measures 10 metres (33 ft) high and is constructed of local stone. It was declared a national monument in 1938 by the South African Historical Monuments Commission.

The pyramid bears the following inscription: "In the memory of one of the most perfect of human beings who has given her name to the name to the town below".

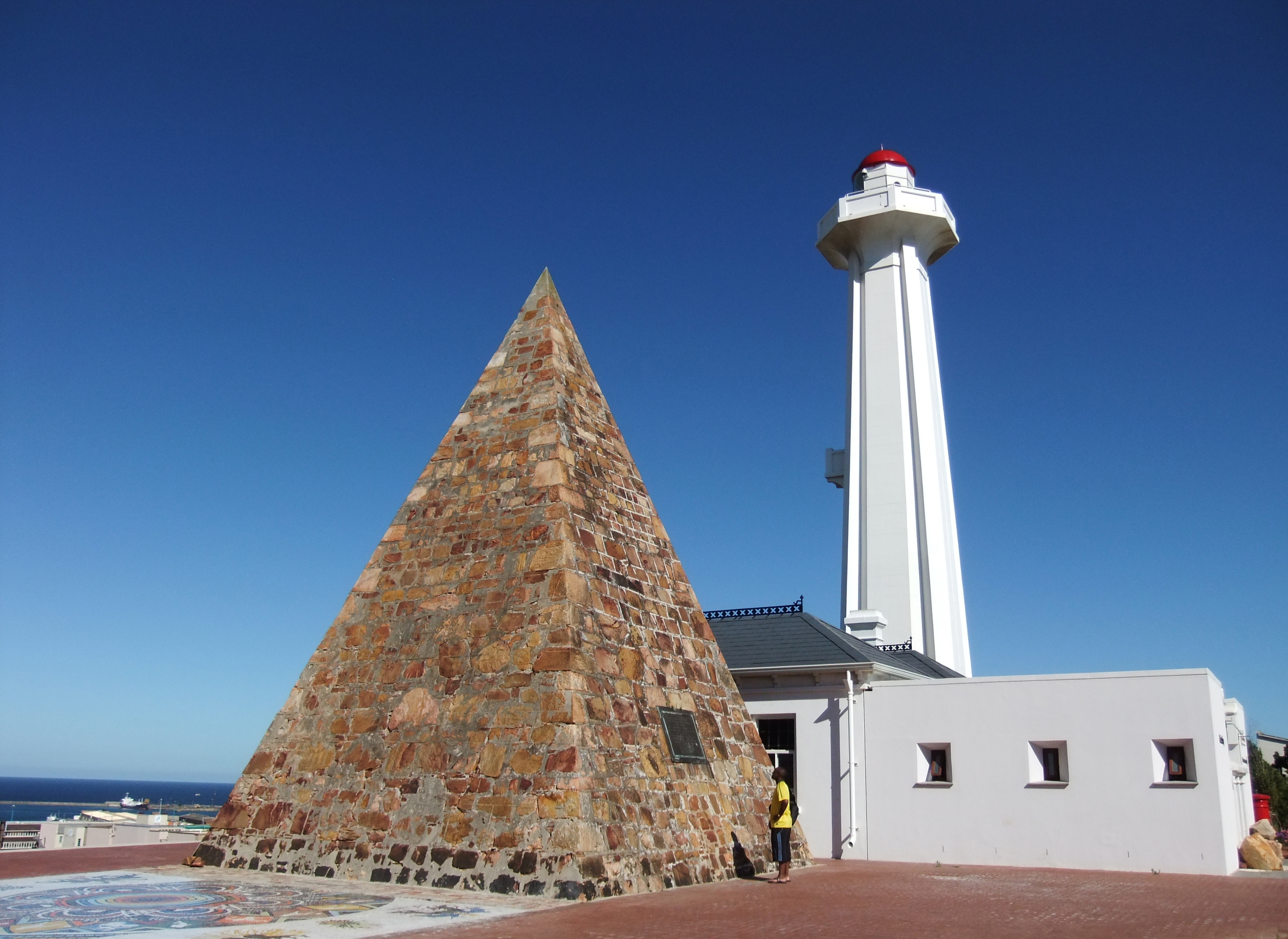
The Donkin Memorial

Sir Rufane Donkin named the town Port Elizabeth after his late wife and declared that the land around the pyramid would be a reserve "open to all in perpetuity". The Donkin Memorial and reserve is part of the Donkin Heritage Trail.

A lighthouse (built in 1861) stands next to the pyramid, serving the harbour below.

== Symbol of Port Elizabeth ==
The silhouette of the Donkin memorial and lighthouse has been used as a symbol to represent the town of Port Elizabeth.
