= Scottish Meteorological Society =

Climate and Meteorological society

The Scottish Meteorological Society was founded in 1855 by David Milne-Home with private funding, particularly from wealthy landowners who wished to compile meteorological records in order to improve agriculture.

The Society founded the observatory on Ben Nevis, officially opened in 1883.

In 1921, the Society amalgamated with the Royal Meteorological Society.

== Publications ==
- Journal of the Scottish Meteorological Society, Volume 1 (1864) - Volume 18 (1917/19)

== Notable members ==
- W S Bruce
- Alexander Buchan, credited with establishing the weather map as the basis of weather forecasting
- David Milne-Home, chairman of the Council of the Society
- Cargill Gilston Knott, President of the Society
- John Murray, oceanographer
- Robert Traill Omond, first Superintendent of the Ben Nevis observatory
- Dr James Stark, first Secretary of the Society
- Thomas Stevenson, co-founder and secretary
- Charles Thomson Rees Wilson
- Clement Lindley Wragge, awarded the Society's Gold Medal
