= John Stapleton (MP) =

English Liberal MP (1816-1891)

MP for Berwick upon Tweed
- In office 1857–1859
- In office 1868–1874

Personal details
- Born: 11 April 1816
- Died: 25 December 1891 (aged 75)

John Stapleton (11 April 1816 – 25 December 1891) was an English Liberal Party politician who sat in the House of Commons between 1852 and 1874.

== Early life ==
Stapleton was the fourth son of Thomas Stapleton, of Carlton Hill, Yorkshire, and his wife Maria Juliana Gerard, daughter of Sir Robert Gerard, 9th Baronet. Stapleton was educated at the University of Edinburgh, Göttingen and Berlin. He was called to the bar at Lincoln's Inn in 1833, but later moved to the Middle Temple. He went on the Northern circuit.

== Political career ==
At the 1852 general election, Stapleton was elected as a Member of Parliament (MP) for Berwick upon Tweed in 1857, but was unseated on petition in 1859. At the 1868 general election Stapleton was re-elected for Berwick, and held the seat until his defeat at the 1874.

Stapleton died at the age of 75.

Stapleton married Frances Dorothea King (the second daughter of Edward Bolton King, of Chadshunt, Warwickshire). They had three sons and four daughters.

Parliament of the United Kingdom
Preceded by John Campbell Renton; Matthew Forster	Member of Parliament for Berwick-upon-Tweed; 1852–1853; With: Matthew Forster	Succeeded by Dudley Marjoribanks; John Forster
Preceded by Dudley Marjoribanks; John Forster	Member of Parliament for Berwick-upon-Tweed; 1857–1859; With: Dudley Marjoribanks	Succeeded by Ralph Earle; Charles William Gordon
Preceded by Alexander Mitchell; Dudley Marjoribanks	Member of Parliament for Berwick-upon-Tweed; 1868–1874; With: Viscount Bury	Succeeded by Dudley Marjoribanks; David Milne Home
