= Sir Francis Blake, 3rd Baronet, of Twizell Castle =

English landowner (1774–1860)

Sir Francis Blake, 3rd Baronet MP (c. 1774 – 10 September 1860) was a landowner, politician, and baronet who sat as Member of Parliament.

== Background ==
Born at Heston, he was the son of Sir Francis Blake, 2nd Baronet and his wife, the daughter of Alexander Douglas. In 1818, he succeeded his father as baronet.

== Career ==
Blake was commissioned a captain in the Northumberland Militia in 1794 and was appointed colonel of the Northumberland Fencibles in 1795. He entered the British House of Commons in 1820, sitting as a member of parliament (MP) for Berwick-upon-Tweed until 1826. A year later, he was re-elected for the constituency, representing it until 1834. Blake owned estates at Twizell Castle, Tillmouth House, Seghill and Duddo, which he sold for £45000 in 1823.

== Death and legacy ==
He married Jane, daughter of William Neale, in 1827 but had no legitimate children, and the baronetcy became extinct upon his death. His illegitimate son Frederick Blake (1835–1909) suffered severe sunstroke while serving as an army officer and was confined to a mental asylum in 1873. His father granted him a life interest in property at Seghill and also bequeathed Helen, the widow of his brother Robert Dudley Blake (1776–1860). Blake's principal beneficiary was Captain Francis Blake (1832–1861), whose son Francis Douglas Blake was created a baronet in his own right in 1907. The family repurchased Seghill Park from the Treasury Solicitor following the intestacy of Helen Blake.

Parliament of the United Kingdom
Preceded by Henry St Paul; Viscount Ossulston	Member of Parliament for Berwick-upon-Tweed; 1820–1826; With: Viscount Ossulston 1820–1823; Sir John Beresford 1823–1826	Succeeded by John Gladstone; Marcus Beresford
Preceded by John Gladstone; Marcus Beresford	Member of Parliament for Berwick-upon-Tweed; 1827–1835; With: Marcus Beresford 1827–1832; Sir Rufane Shaw Donkin 1832–1835	Succeeded by James Bradshaw; Sir Rufane Shaw Donkin
Baronetage of Great Britain
Preceded by Francis Blake	Baronet (of Twizell Castle); 1818–1860	Extinct
