= John Forster (MP) =

British Whig politician

Member of Parliament for Berwick-upon-Tweed
- In office 14 May 1853 – 28 March 1857 Serving with Dudley Marjoribanks
- Preceded by: John Stapleton; Matthew Forster
- Succeeded by: Dudley Marjoribanks; John Stapleton

Personal details
- Born: 1817
- Died: 1878 (aged 60–61)
- Party: Whig

John Forster (1817–1878) was a British Whig politician.

Forster was elected Whig MP for Berwick-upon-Tweed at a by-election in 1853, which was held after both his father, Matthew Forster, and the Radical MP John Stapleton were unseated due to bribery and treating during the 1852 general election.

Forster held the seat until 1857, when he did not seek re-election.

Parliament of the United Kingdom
Preceded by John Stapleton; Matthew Forster	Member of Parliament for Berwick-upon-Tweed; 1853–1857; With: Dudley Marjoribanks	Succeeded by Dudley Marjoribanks; John Stapleton
