= Paxton House, Berwickshire =

Historic house in Scotland

Coordinates: 55°45′40.12″N 2°6′35.93″W

Designations

Inventory of Gardens and Designed Landscapes in Scotland
- Official name: Paxton House
- Designated: 30 June 1987
- Reference no.: GDL00310

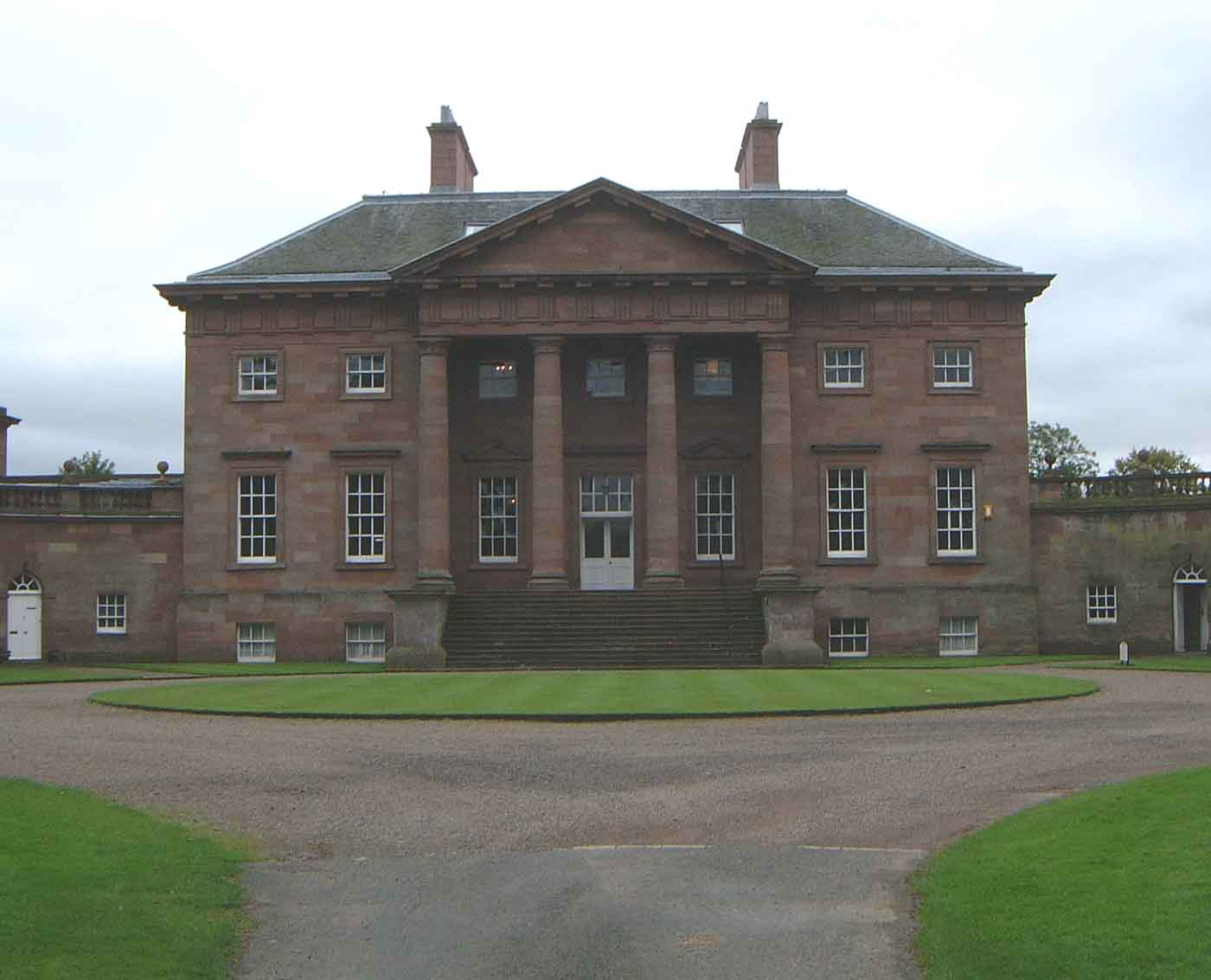
Paxton House

Paxton House is a historic house at Paxton, Berwickshire, in the Scottish Borders, a few miles south-west of Berwick-upon-Tweed, overlooking the River Tweed.

It is a country house built for Patrick Home of Billie in an unsuccessful attempt to woo a Prussian heiress, Sophie de Brandt. Attributed to James Adam (possibly in concert with John Adam), it was built between 1758 and 1766, under the supervision of James Nisbet, with extensive interiors (c. 1773) by Robert Adam, as well as furniture by Thomas Chippendale. The house was bought in 1773 by Ninian Home, the nephew of Patrick Home. Ninian Home only stayed periodically and left most of the decisions to Robert Adam and Thomas Chippendale. The East Wing was added in 1812-13 by architect Robert Reid to house the library and picture gallery.

Other inhabitants were Alexander Home and his son George Home (of Wedderburn and Paxton).

In 1852 Jean Milne, the wife of David Milne, inherited the house and he renamed himself David Milne-Home.

Formerly the seat of the Paxton family, who became Forman-Home, Milne-Home, and finally Home-Robertson as the direct male lines failed and the inheritance progressed through a female. In 1988, the last laird, John David Home Robertson, a Labour member of Parliament, placed the house and grounds into the Paxton House Historic Building Preservation Trust. It is now open to the public and is a Partner Gallery of National Galleries Scotland.

== Paxton House Gallery ==
In 1780 Patrick Home of Wedderburn returned from his eight-year-long Grand Tour with an extensive collection of British and European paintings and died before the paintings were unpacked. Later on, Jean Home, who was to inherit the house and the paintings, employed the Master of Work to the Crown of Scotland, architect Robert Reid (1776–1856), to build what is now the East Wing of Paxton House to accommodate a library and a gallery. The gallery is now the only room housing a collection of paintings.

The Paxton Trust in association with National Galleries Scotland have restored the Gallery to its original colour scheme. Patrick Home's pictures are now dispersed; a collection from the National Gallery has been hung in their place in the 19th-century manner.

== See also ==
- Wedderburn Castle
