= John Cooper (fl. 1529) =

English Member of Parliament

John Cooper (died by 1532), was an English Member of Parliament. He represented Berwick-upon-Tweed in 1529.
