= Marjoribanks =

Marjoribanks is a surname. Notable people with the surname include:

- Charles Albany Marjoribanks (1794–c. 1833), Scottish Liberal MP
- David Robertson, 1st Baron Marjoribanks (né Marjoribanks 1797–1893), Scottish stockbroker and politician
- Dudley Marjoribanks, 1st Baron Tweedmouth (1820–1894), Scottish businessman and politician
- Edward Marjoribanks (disambiguation), several people
- George Marjoribanks (died 1931), Scottish polo player and banker
- Hugh Marjoribanks (1933–2017), Australian cricketer
- James Marjoribanks (1911–2003), British diplomat and ambassador
- Sir John Marjoribanks, 1st Baronet (1763–1833), Scottish MP and Lord Provost of Edinburgh
- Kevin Marjoribanks (1938–2006), 15th vice-chancellor of the University of Adelaide
- Norman Marjoribanks (1872–1939), Scottish civil servant
- Gerald Brian Marjoribanks (1942-2024), Footballer and BBC Presenter.

== Other uses ==
- Miss Marjoribanks, 1866 novel by Margaret Oliphant

== See also ==
- Marjoribanks baronets
- Clan Marjoribanks
