= Dudley Marjoribanks =

Dudley Marjoribanks may refer to:

- Dudley Marjoribanks, 1st Baron Tweedmouth (1820–1894), Scottish businessman and politician
- Dudley Marjoribanks, 3rd Baron Tweedmouth (1874–1935), British army officer and courtier
