= 1873 Berwickshire by-election =

UK parliamentary by-election

The 1873 Berwickshire by-election was fought on 27 June 1873. The by-election was fought due to the elevation to the peerage of the incumbent MP of the Liberal Party, David Robertson. It was won by the Liberal candidate William Miller.
