= Hugh Hepburne-Scott, 6th Lord Polwarth =

MP for Berwickshire

Hugh Hepburne-Scott

Member of Parliament for Berwickshire
- In office 1780 – 18 March 1781
- Preceded by: Sir John Paterson, 3rd Baronet
- In office 12 April 1781 – 1784
- Succeeded by: Patrick Home

Personal details
- Born: 10 April 1758
- Died: 29 December 1841 (aged 83)
- Spouse: Harriet Hepburne-Scott (née Brühl)
- Children: Henry Hepburne-Scott, 7th Lord Polwarth; Francis Scott
- Parent: Walter Scott (father)
- Relatives: Hugh Hume-Campbell, 3rd Earl of Marchmont

Hugh Hepburne-Scott, 6th Lord Polwarth (10 April 1758 – 29 December 1841) was the MP for Berwickshire from 1780 till 18 March 1781 and 12 April 1781 till 1784. He became the 6th Lord Polwarth on 25 June 1835.

Hugh was born 10 April 1758, the oldest surviving son of the MP for Roxburghshire Walter Scott. On 29 September 1795, he married Harriet, the daughter of Hans Maurice, Count Brühl. He established his claim as the 6th Lord Polwarth on 25 June 1835.
