= Tweedmouth (disambiguation) =

Tweedmouth is an area of the town of Berwick-upon-Tweed, Northumberland, England.

Tweedmouth may also refer to:

- Baron Tweedmouth, a title in the peerage of the United Kingdom
- Tweed mouth, a Scottish-English border estuary sometimes called a firth at the mouth of the River Tweed
