= Walter Scott (MP for Roxburghshire) =

Scottish MP for Roxburghshire

Member of Parliament for Roxburghshire
- In office 1747 – April 1765
- Preceded by: William Douglas, 14th of Cavers
- Succeeded by: Sir Gilbert Elliot, 3rd Baronet, of Minto

Personal details
- Born: 31 December 1724
- Died: 25 January 1793 (aged 68)
- Spouse: Diana Hume Scott (née Campbell)
- Parent: Walter Scott (father)
- Relatives: Ann Scott
- Education: Glasgow University

Walter Scott (31 December 1724 – 25 January 1793) was the Scottish MP for Roxburghshire from 1747 till April 1765.

Walter Scott was born 31 December 1724, the first son of Walter Scott by his third wife, Ann. On 18 April 1754, he married Lady Diana Hume, the daughter of Hugh Hume-Campbell, 3rd Earl of Marchmont.

== Children ==
- Hugh Hepburne-Scott, 6th Lord Polwarth
