= William Cargill (Berwick MP) =

British Conservative politician (1813–1894)

William Walter Cargill (1813 – 23 May 1894) was a British Conservative Party politician.

He was elected at a by-election in June 1863 as a Member of Parliament for Berwick-upon-Tweed. His victory by a margin of 18 votes (328–310) was immediately denounced by his Liberal opponent Alexander Mitchell. Cargill's attempt at an acceptance speech was drowned out by the crowd, which hustled him as he left and broke some glass both in the Guildhall and in the inn where he was staying. Mitchell announced that he would rather be defeated than win by the means which had secured Cargill's victory, and promised that he would lodge a petition against the result.

When the petition was heard before a House of Commons committee, Mitchell's lawyer produced evidence of bribery in Cargill's interest.

However, when the hearing resumed on a later day, he protested that the committee had not allowed him to call the witnesses he needed. He then declined to offer any further evidence. The committee concluded that there was there of bribery was indirect, and that there was no proof that had been carried out on behalf of Cargill. They dismissed the petition, but noted that it was neither frivolous not vexatious.

At the general election in 1865, Cargill Mitchell won the seat from Cargill.

Cargill unsuccessfully contested Berwick-upon-Tweed at the 1880 general election. At the Berwick-upon-Tweed by-election in 1881, Cargill arrived at the town and announced his intention to stand, but does not appear to have been nominated.

Cargill was the son of William Cargill (1774-1860), Superintendent of Otago in New Zealand and a member of the New Zealand Parliament; his younger brothers Edward and John would also serve in the New Zealand Parliament.

Parliament of the United Kingdom
Preceded by Dudley Marjoribanks; Charles William Gordon	Member of Parliament for Berwick-upon-Tweed; 1863–1865; With: Dudley Marjoribanks	Succeeded by Dudley Marjoribanks; Alexander Mitchell
