= 1916 Berwickshire by-election =

1916 UK parliamentary by-election

The 1916 Berwickshire by-election was a parliamentary by-election held for the UK House of Commons constituency of Berwickshire in the Scottish Borders on 18 July 1916.

== Vacancy ==
Under the provisions of the Succession to the Crown Act 1707 and a number of subsequent Acts, MPs appointed to certain ministerial and legal offices were at this time required to seek re-election. The by-election in Berwickshire was caused by the appointment of the sitting Liberal MP, Harold "Jack" Tennant as Secretary for Scotland.

== Process ==
The writ for the by-election was moved in Parliament on 10 July and the returning officer, the Sheriff of Berwickshire, fixed 18 July for the nomination of candidates.

== Candidates ==
As the other political parties were collaborating in the wartime coalition government of H H Asquith, the Tories were not expected to oppose Tennant and there was not, as yet, any tradition of Labour contesting Berwickshire. In the absence of any other candidate, Tennant was duly returned unopposed on 18 July and, introduced by the Prime Minister and Eugene Wason MP, re-took his seat in the House of Commons on 20 July to cheers as Secretary for Scotland.

== Result ==
Berwickshire by-election, 1916
Party	Candidate	Votes	%	±%
Liberal	Harold Tennant	Unopposed	N/A	N/A
Liberal hold				

== See also ==
- Lists of United Kingdom by-elections
- United Kingdom by-election records
