= Home-Purves-Hume-Campbell baronets =

Extinct baronetcy in the Baronetage of Nova Scotia

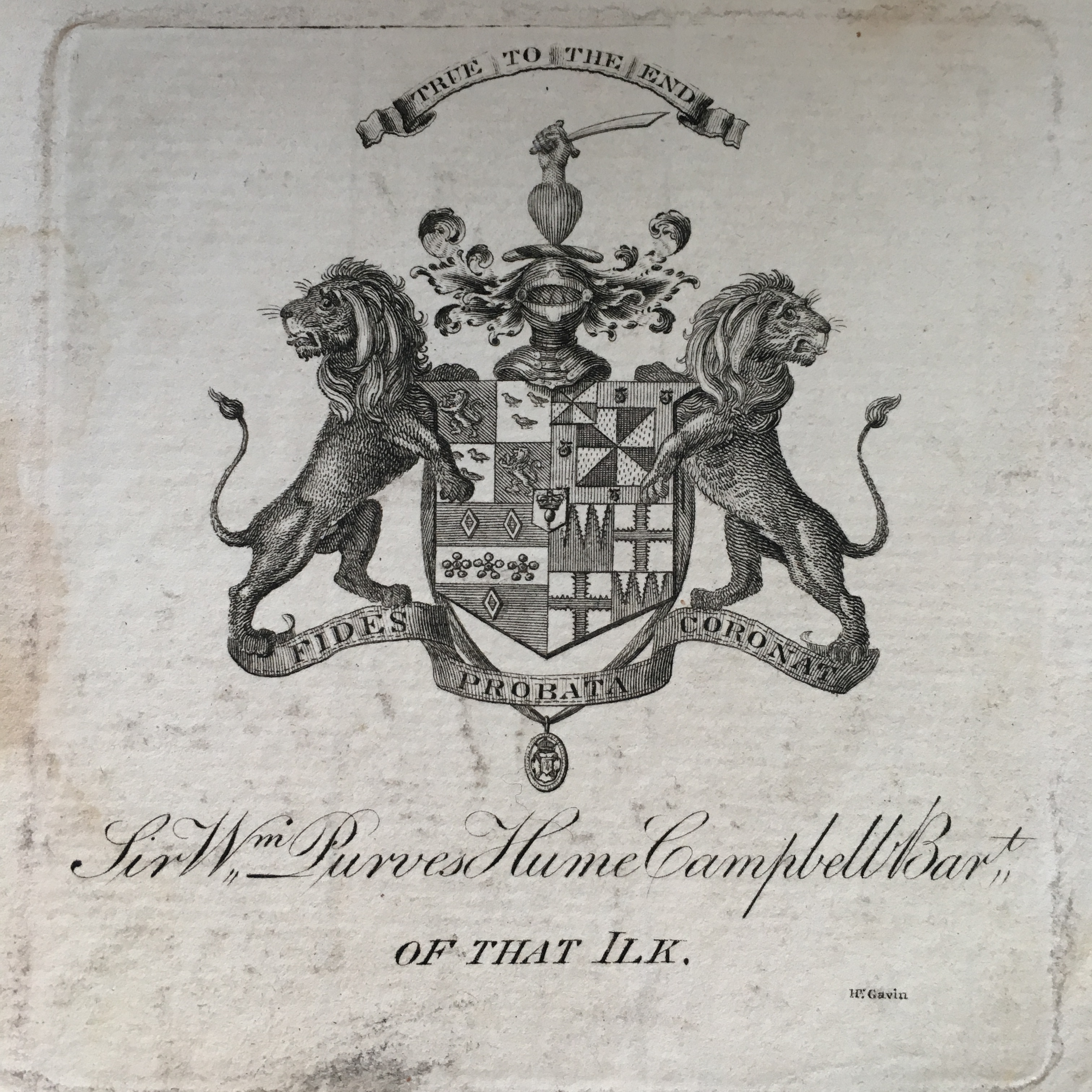
Ex-libris of the 6th baronet

The Purves, later Purves-Hume-Campbell, later Home-Purves-Hume-Campbell Baronetcy, of Purves Hall in the County of Berwick, was a title in the Baronetage of Nova Scotia. It was created on 25 July 1665 for William Purves. The fourth baronet married Lady Anne, daughter of Alexander Hume-Campbell, 2nd Earl of Marchmont. Their grandson, the sixth baronet, assumed the additional surnames of Hume and Campbell. The latter's son, the seventh baronet, assumed the additional surname of Home. He sat as member of parliament for Berwickshire. The title became extinct on the death of the eighth Baronet in 1960.

Helen Purves-Hume-Campbell, daughter of the seventh baronet, married Sir George Warrender, 7th Baronet and was the mother of Vice-Admiral Sir George Warrender, 7th Baronet and grandmother of Victor Warrender, 1st Baron Bruntisfield.

== Purves, later Purves-Hume-Campbell, later Home-Purves-Hume-Campbell baronets, of Purves Hall (1665) ==
- Sir William Purves, 1st Baronet (died c. 1685)
- Sir Alexander Purves, 2nd Baronet (died 1701)
- Sir William Purves, 3rd Baronet (died 1730)
- Sir William Purves, 4th Baronet (1701–1762)
- Sir Alexander Purves, 5th Baronet (1739–1812)
- Sir William Purves-Hume-Campbell, 6th Baronet (1767–1833)
- Sir Hugh Purves-Hume-Campbell, 7th Baronet (1812–1894)
- Sir John Home-Purves-Hume-Campbell, 8th Baronet (1879–1960)

== See also ==
- Lord Polwarth
- Purves (surname)
