= Edward Marjoribanks, 2nd Baron Tweedmouth =

British politician (1849–1909)

The Right Honourable The Lord Tweedmouth KT PC
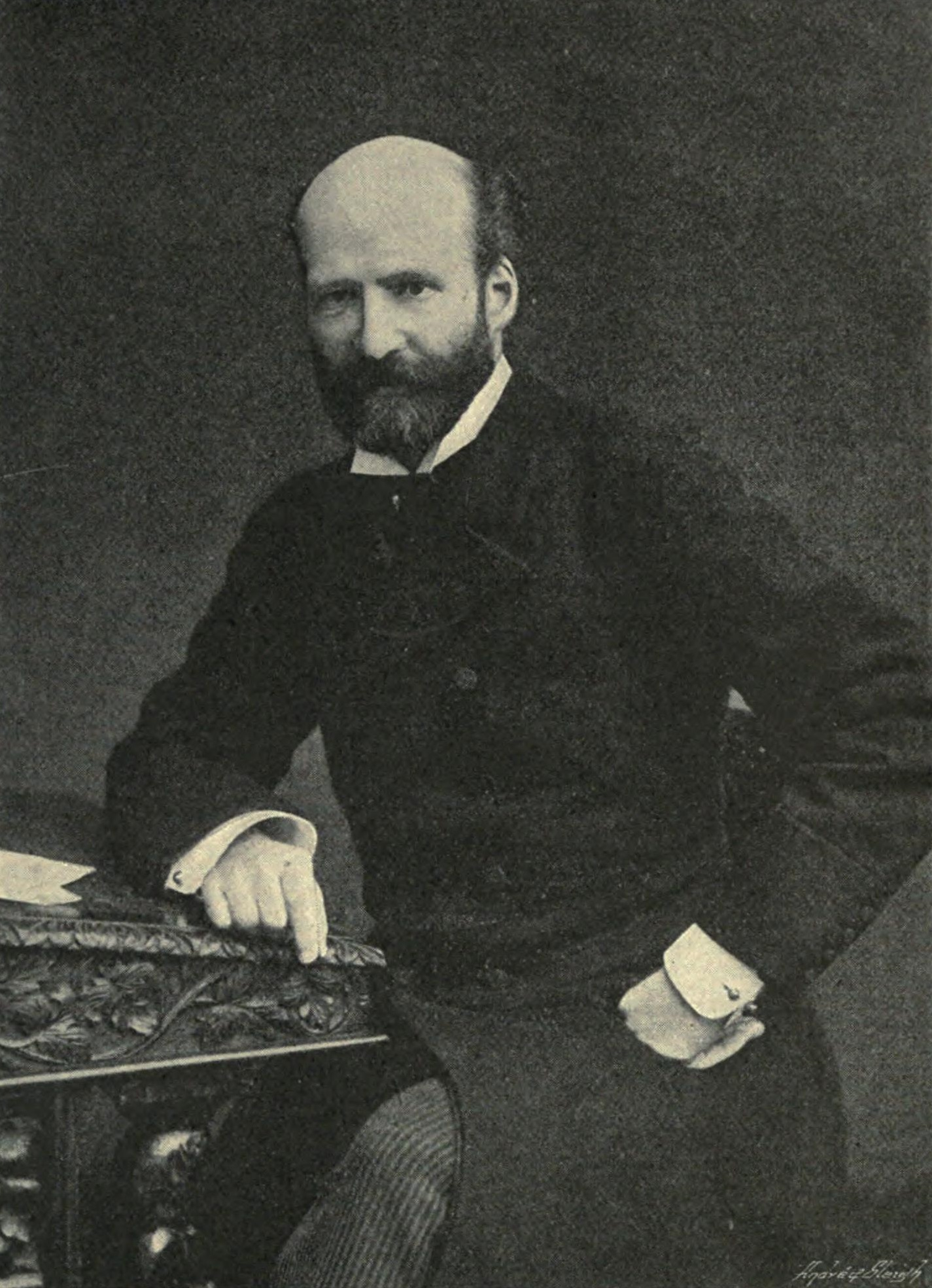

Lord President of the Council
- In office 12 April 1908 – 13 October 1908
- Monarch: Edward VII
- Prime Minister: H. H. Asquith
- Preceded by: The Earl of Crewe
- Succeeded by: The Viscount Wolverhampton

First Lord of the Admiralty
- In office 10 December 1905 – 12 April 1908
- Monarch: Edward VII
- Prime Minister: Sir Henry Campbell-Bannerman
- Preceded by: The Earl Cawdor
- Succeeded by: Reginald McKenna

Chancellor of the Duchy of Lancaster
- In office 28 May 1894 – 21 June 1895
- Monarch: Victoria
- Prime Minister: The Earl of Rosebery
- Preceded by: James Bryce
- Succeeded by: The Lord James of Hereford

Lord Privy Seal
- In office 10 March 1894 – 21 June 1895
- Monarch: Victoria
- Prime Minister: The Earl of Rosebery
- Preceded by: William Ewart Gladstone
- Succeeded by: The Viscount Cross

Personal details
- Born: 8 July 1849
- Died: 15 September 1909 (aged 60)
- Party: Liberal Party
- Spouse: Lady Fanny Spencer-Churchill (1853–1904) (m. 1873; died 1904)
- Parent: Dudley Marjoribanks (father)
- Relatives: Ishbel Marjoribanks (sister)

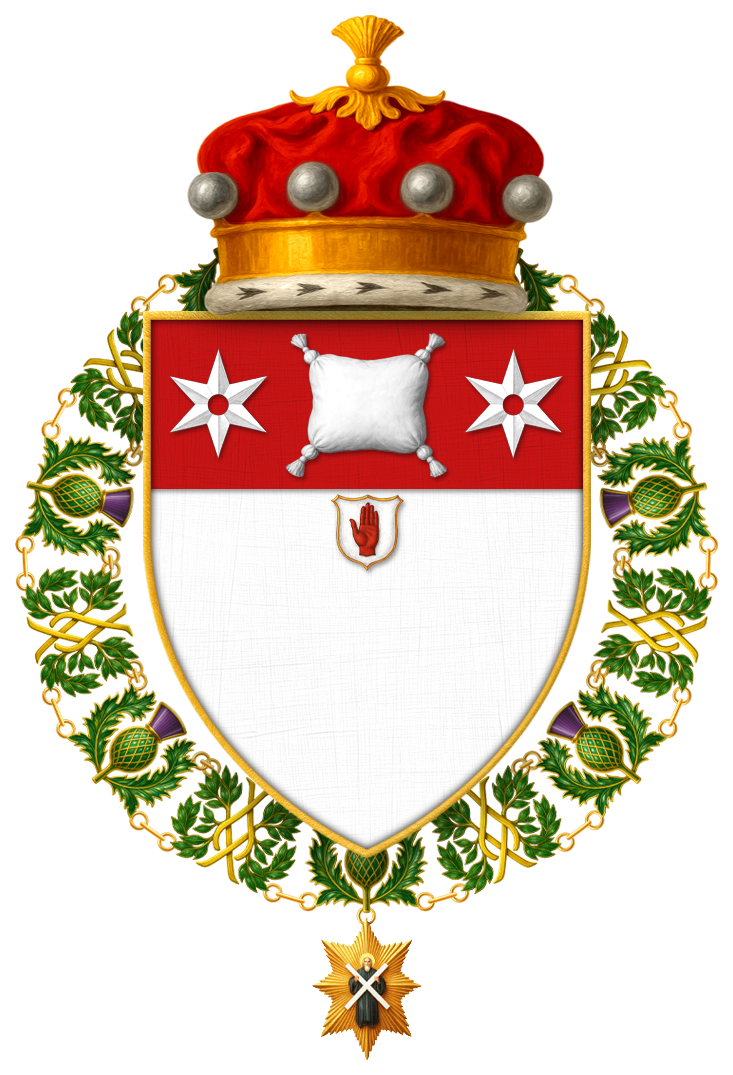
Shield of Arms of Edward Marjoribanks, 2nd Baron Tweedmouth, KT, PC

Edward Marjoribanks, 2nd Baron Tweedmouth, KT, PC (8 July 1849 – 15 September 1909), was a moderate British Liberal Party statesman who sat in the House of Commons from 1880 until 1894 when he inherited his peerage and then sat in the House of Lords. He served in various capacities in the Liberal governments of the late 19th and early 20th centuries.

== Biography ==
Tweedmouth was the son of Dudley Marjoribanks, 1st Baron Tweedmouth, and Isabella, daughter of Sir James Hogg, 1st Baronet. Ishbel Hamilton-Gordon, Marchioness of Aberdeen and Temair, was his sister. He was descended from Joseph Marjoribanks, a wine and fish merchant in Edinburgh who died in 1635 and is thought to have been the grandson of Thomas Marjoribanks of Ratho, head of the lowland Clan Marjoribanks. He was educated at Christ Church, Oxford, but expelled in 1870 following a prank that led to the damage of college sculptures.

=== Political career ===
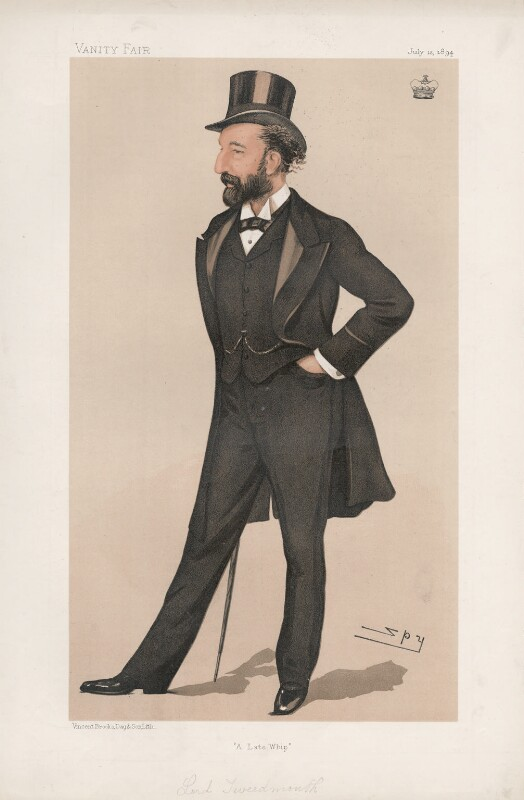
Tweedmouth

Tweedmouth was returned to Parliament for Berwickshire in 1880, a seat he held until 1894. The seat had been held earlier in the century by his great-uncle, Sir John Marjoribanks, 1st Baronet, and cousin, Charles Albany Marjoribanks.

He served under William Ewart Gladstone as Comptroller of the Household in between February and July 1886 and was sworn of the Privy Council the same year. When the Liberals returned to power under Gladstone in 1892, he was made Parliamentary Secretary to the Treasury (chief whip). He succeeded his father in the barony in March 1894, only a few days before Gladstone resigned and Lord Rosebery became prime minister. Rosebery appointed Tweedmouth Lord Privy Seal, with a seat in the cabinet, and in May 1894 he also became Chancellor of the Duchy of Lancaster. He retained these posts until the government fell in 1895.

Amongst other property he inherited the Guisachan estate in Glen Affric from his father but he sold the estate in 1908 to the Earl of Portsmouth.

After ten years in opposition, the Liberals again came to power in December 1905 under Sir Henry Campbell-Bannerman, who appointed Tweedmouth First Lord of the Admiralty, with a seat in the cabinet. In early 1908 he was criticised for corresponding with German emperor William II on the British naval programme. The matter was referred to the House of Commons. Chancellor of the Exchequer H. H. Asquith eventually stated that the correspondence was "a purely personal and private communication, conceived in an entirely friendly spirit" and no action was taken. However, when Asquith succeeded Campbell-Bannerman as prime minister in April 1908 Tweedmouth was removed as head of the Admiralty and became Lord President of the Council. He suffered a nervous breakdown in June 1908, a condition which was said to partly explain his indiscretion in communicating with the German Emperor on naval matters. Although his health later recovered, he resigned in October 1908. He was made a Knight of the Thistle in 1908.

An advocate of workers' rights and social legislation, Tweedmouth was supportive of the Liberal Party's alliance with the Labour Party in the lead-up to the 1906 general election, believing that the Liberals could not win without it, and regarded as "humbug" the view that such an alliance meant class legislation.

He died on 15 September 1909.

== Family ==
Lord Tweedmouth married Lady Fanny Octavia Louise (1853–1904), daughter of John Spencer-Churchill, 7th Duke of Marlborough and aunt of Sir Winston Churchill, in 1873. She reportedly died from cancer in August 1904, aged 51 "at Lord Tweedmouth's Glen Affric shooting lodge". They had a son and heir; Dudley, 3rd Baron Tweedmouth (1874–1935).

Lord Tweedmouth's parliamentary career saw him reported as being the Laird of Guisachan and Glenaffric who was, on occasions, "in a fighting mood". Following Lady Tweedmouth's death, Lord Tweedmouth sold the Lairdship of Glen Affric, the property including the Guisachan Estate and deer park that his family had owned since the 1850s. He was reported as being a "generous laird", who, like his father, "did much for the people" of his estate; the "ties which united the people of Glen Affric with the Laird and his lady were close".

Lord Tweedmouth survived his wife by five years and died in September 1909, aged 60. He was succeeded in the barony by his son, Dudley.

== The Rocking Chair Ranche ==
From 1883 until 1896, he was an owner of and investor in Rocking Chair Ranche located in Collingsworth County, Texas, along with his father, The 1st Baron Tweedmouth, and his brother-in-law, The 7th Earl of Aberdeen.

== Notes ==
Parliament of the United Kingdom
Preceded by Hon. Robert Baillie-Hamilton	Member of Parliament for Berwickshire; 1880–1894	Succeeded by Harold Tennant
Political offices
Preceded by Lord Arthur Hill	Comptroller of the Household; 1886	Succeeded by Lord Arthur Hill
Preceded by Aretas Akers-Douglas	Parliamentary Secretary to the Treasury; 1892–1894	Succeeded by Thomas Edward Ellis
Preceded by William Ewart Gladstone	Lord Privy Seal; 1894–1895	Succeeded by The Viscount Cross
Preceded by James Bryce	Chancellor of the Duchy of Lancaster; 1894–1895	Succeeded by The Lord James of Hereford
Preceded by The Earl Cawdor	First Lord of the Admiralty; 1905–1908	Succeeded by Reginald McKenna
Preceded by The Earl of Crewe	Lord President of the Council; 1908	Succeeded by The Viscount Wolverhampton
Peerage of the United Kingdom
Preceded by Dudley Coutts Marjoribanks	Baron Tweedmouth; 1894–1909	Succeeded by Dudley Churchill Marjoribanks
