= Alexander Mitchell (British politician) =

Alexander Mitchell (1831 – 16 May 1873) was a Liberal Party politician in the United Kingdom. He was member of parliament (MP) for Berwick-upon-Tweed from 1865 to 1868.

Parliament of the United Kingdom
Preceded by William Cargill and Dudley Marjoribanks	Member of Parliament for Berwick-upon-Tweed; 1865–1868; With: Dudley Marjoribanks	Succeeded by Viscount Bury and John Stapleton
