= Patrick Home =

Scottish MP for Berwickshire (1784 – 1796)

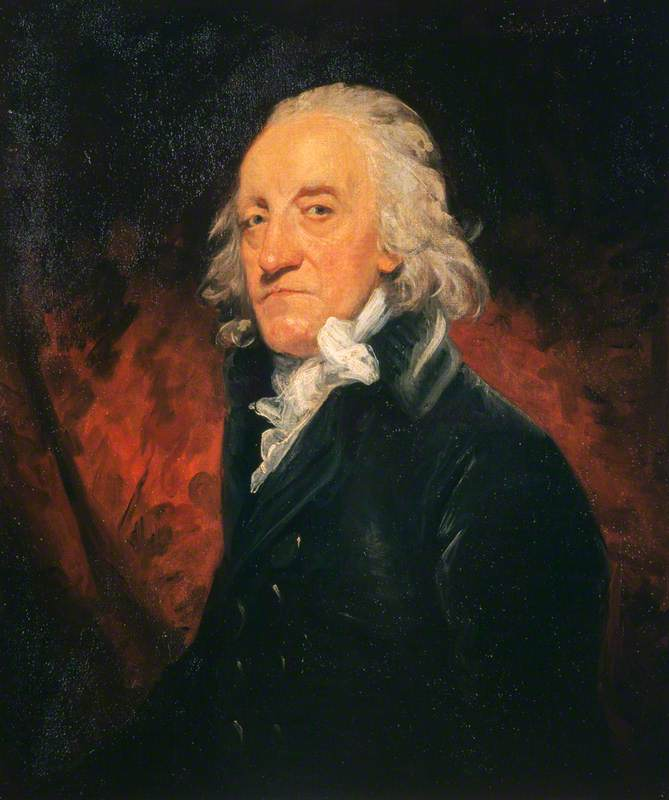
- Portrait of Patrick Home by Joshua Reynolds (1787)

Member of Parliament for Berwickshire
- In office 1784–1796
- Preceded by: Hugh Hepburne-Scott
- Succeeded by: George Baillie

Personal details
- Born: 22 May 1728
- Died: 19 December 1808 (aged 80)
- Spouse: Jane Home (née Graham)
- Parents: Rev. Ninian Home of Billie (father); Margaret Home (mother)
- Relatives: Ninian Home (nephew)

Patrick Home (22 May 1728 – 19 December 1808) was the Scottish MP for Berwickshire from 1784 till 1796.

== Early life ==
Patrick Home was born 22 May 1728 to Rev. Ninian Home and his second wife, Margaret Home.

Home inherited £1,000 from his father, Ninian Home, parish minister of Sprouston, Roxburghshire, deposed in 1718 due to his political leanings and behaviour.

== Political career ==
In 1784, he was elected MP of Berwickshire with the support of Henry Dundas. In Parliament, he was politically aligned with William Pitt the Younger and voted in favour of Pitt's plans to reform Parliament.

He had hoped to make his nephew Ninian succeed him as MP in 1789 but through lobbying from Patrick and George Home, Pitt made Ninian Governor of Grenada in August 1792. On 15 March 1796, he voted against the abolition of the slave trade, shortly before he resigned due to deafness and frailty.

== Marriage to Jane Graham ==
In May 1771, Patrick Home married Jane, the daughter of John Graham. Jane's brother, also called John Graham, was owner of the Douglaston estate in Grenada from 1768 and a close friend of Home's nephew, Ninian. Graham owned land in Tobago and later became Governor of Tobago thanks to Home's assistance.

Home lived with Jane in Italy until their separation in 1779. Home remained in contact with his former in-laws, managing younger John Graham's finances, estate, and slaves. Jane became a nun, and moved to Belgium to join a convent there.

He died on 19 December 1808.
