= Joseph Sabine (British Army officer) =

British army officer and politician (1661–1739)

General Joseph Sabine
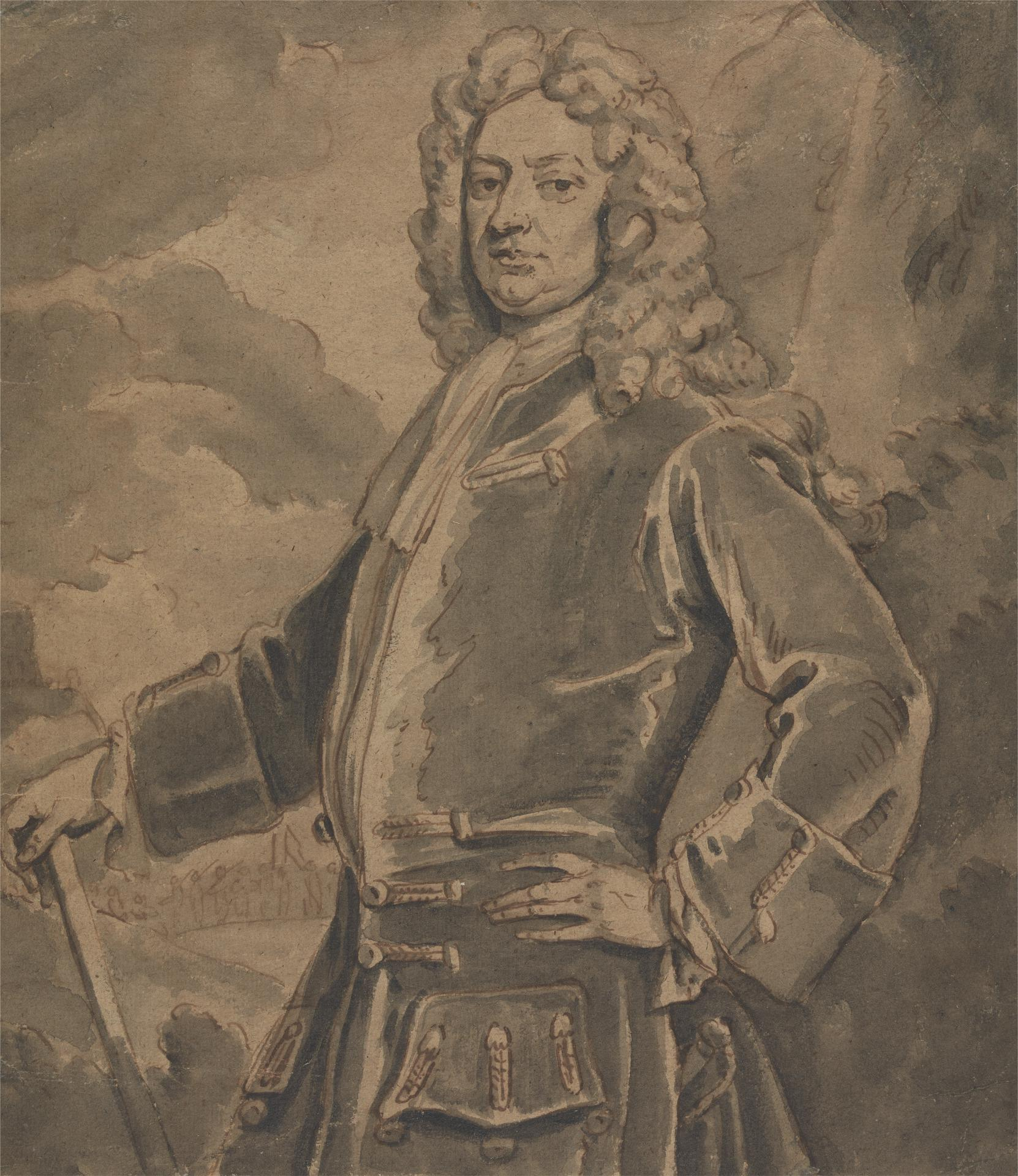
- Portrait attributed to Edward Byng
- Born: c. 1661
- Died: 24 October 1739 (aged 77–78); Gibraltar, Iberian Peninsula
- Burial place: Tewin Church, Hertfordshire, England
- Military career
- Allegiance: England; Great Britain
- Branch: English Army; British Army
- Service years: c.1689–1739
- Rank: General
- Conflicts: Nine Years' War; Siege of Namur (1695); War of the Spanish Succession; Battle of Schellenberg (WIA); Battle of Blenheim (WIA); Battle of Ramillies; Battle of Oudenarde; Siege of Lille (1708); Jacobite rising of 1715

General Joseph Sabine (c. 1661 – 24 October 1739) was a British army officer and politician who served in the Nine Years' War, War of the Spanish Succession and Jacobite rising of 1715. He also sat in the House of Commons of Great Britain from 1727 to 1734, becoming governor of Gibraltar in 1730.

== Early life ==
Sabine was probably the son of Walter Sabine and grandson of Avery Sabine, alderman and mayor of Canterbury, who died in 1648. He joined the English Army at the time of the Glorious Revolution. In 1690 he married Hester Whitfield, daughter of Henry Whitfield, who died at the age of 24.

They had three sons who all died young and one daughter, Margaret Diana Sabine, who married Sir Charles Herbert Sheffield, 1st Baronet.

== Military career ==
Sabine was appointed captain lieutenant to Sir Henry Ingoldsby's regiment of foot on 8 March 1689 and became captain of the grenadier company before 18 October 1689. He served in Ireland under William III and was granted estates in County Kildare. On 13 July 1691, he became major of Colonel Charles Herbert's regiment. He took part in William III's campaigns in the Low Countries, during the Nine Years' War and became lieutenant colonel on 6 July 1695 and fought at the Siege of Namur.

Sabine served with the 23rd or Royal Welch Fusiliers in the War of the Spanish Succession. He obtained the brevet rank of colonel on 1 January 1703. Under Marlborough he was wounded on 2 July 1704 at the Battle of Schellenberg and on 1 April following became colonel of his regiment. He commanded his regiment at the Battle of Blenheim. He took part in the Battle of Ramillies, being stationed with the fusiliers on the right of the English line. On 1 January 1707 he was promoted to the rank of brigadier-general. At the Battle of Oudenarde on 11 July 1708, he led the attack on the village of Heynam. Afterwards he took part in the siege of Lille that same year. On 1 January 1710 he was appointed major-general, and was given command of the Citadel at Ghent, where he had to put down a mutiny in 1712. He married as his second wife Margaretta Newsham in 1711.

When peace was concluded, Sabine returned with his regiment to England. In 1715 he purchased the estate of Tewin in Hertfordshire and rebuilt the house in the following year. Then in 1716 he commanded a brigade sent to confront the Pretender's army at Perth. Later that year he became Commander of the British Army throughout Scotland. in May 1716. In July, the John Murray, 1st Duke of Atholl, complained of 'the conduct of General Sabine and other King's officers, in regard to rebel prisoners and ... of the plundering and other impositions made by the troops' in Perthshire. In 1719 he was appointed Governor of Berwick and of Holy Island.

== Political career ==
At the 1727 British general election, Sabine was returned on the Government interest as Member of Parliament for Berwick-upon-Tweed. He voted with the Government until he was appointed Governor of Gibraltar in 1730, having been promoted to General. He did not stand at the 1734 British general election.

Sabine died at Gibraltar on 24 October 1739. His portrait was painted by Godfrey Kneller in 1711 and engraved by Faber in 1742.

Parliament of Great Britain
Preceded by William Kerr; Henry Grey	Member of Parliament for Berwick-upon-Tweed; 1727–1734; With: George Liddell	Succeeded by George Liddell; Lord Polwarth
Government offices
Preceded by Jasper Clayton	Governor of Gibraltar; 1730–1739	Succeeded by Francis Columbine
