= Sir James Pringle, 4th Baronet =

British soldier and politician

Sir James Pringle, 4th Baronet (6 November 1726 – 7 April 1809), was a British soldier and politician who sat in the House of Commons from 1761 to 1779.

Pringle was the son of Sir Robert Pringle, 3rd Baronet of Stichill and his wife Catherine Pringle, daughter. of James Pringle of Torwoodlee, Selkirk and was baptized on 6 November 1726. In 1744, he joined the army in the Royal Scots Fusiliers as a 2nd Lieutenant and was a lieutenant in 1747 and captain in 1759. He served in Flanders during the War of the Austrian Succession and at Minden in 1759. He was a, major in 1759 and lieutenant-colonel in 1762.

In 1761 Pringle was returned unopposed as Member of Parliament for Berwickshire. In 1765 he became lieutenant-colonel of the 59th Foot. He married Elizabeth MacLeod, daughter of Norman MacLeod of MacLeod on 11 September 1767. He was returned again for Berwickshire in the 1768 general election. In 1770 he retired from the army and in 1774 was appointed Master of the King’s works in Scotland, He was re-elected MP for Berwickshire in the 1774 general election. In April 1778 Pringle accepted a commission as lieutenant-colonel in the 'Southern regiment of Fencible Men' (the Duke of Buccleuch’s Fencibles). He vacated his seat in 1779 in favour of Sir John Paterson, son-in-law of Lord Marchmont. In Parliament he was accounted a silent and undistinguished Member. He succeeded his father in the baronetcy on 14 December 1779 and from then on he dedicated his time to the managing of his estates. In 1797 he served with the Roxburgh yeomanry.

Sir James was a member of The Royal Company of Archers from 1778. He was a Brigadier in the Royal Company and was elected President of Council in 1783. He remained in office until his death in 1809. The Royal Company has Sir James Pringle's portrait, with him wearing his Badge of a Baronet of Nova Scotia, painted by David Martin in 1795.

Pringle died on 7 April 1809.

Parliament of Great Britain
| Preceded by Hon. Alexander Hume-Campbell | Member of Parliament for Berwickshire; 1761–1779 | Succeeded by Sir John Paterson, Bt |
Baronetage of Nova Scotia
| Preceded by Robert Pringle | Baronet (of Stichill); 1779-1809 | Succeeded by John Pringle |
