= Robert Baillie-Hamilton =

British politician

The Hon. Robert Baillie-Hamilton (8 October 1828 – 5 September 1891) was a British politician.

== Background ==
Baillie-Hamilton was a younger son of George Baillie-Hamilton, 10th Earl of Haddington, and Georgina, daughter of the Venerable Robert Markham, Archdeacon of York. George Baillie-Hamilton-Arden, 11th Earl of Haddington, was his elder brother.

== Political and military career ==
Baillie-Hamilton was a Major in the 44th Regiment. In 1874 he was returned to Parliament for Berwickshire, a seat he held until 1880.

== Personal life ==
Baillie-Hamilton married Mary Gavin, daughter of Sir John Pringle, 5th Baronet, in 1861. The marriage was childless. He died in September 1891, aged 62. Mary Baillie-Hamilton died in April 1911.

Parliament of the United Kingdom
Preceded by William Miller	Member of Parliament for Berwickshire; 1874–1880	Succeeded by Edward Marjoribanks
