= Sir Hugh Purves-Hume-Campbell, 7th Baronet =

British Conservative politician

Sir Hugh Purves-Hume-Campbell Bt
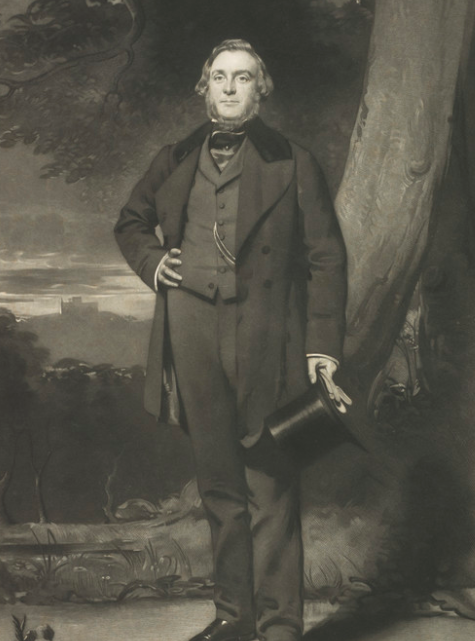

Member of Parliament for Berwickshire
- In office 13 January 1834 – 4 August 1847
- Preceded by: Charles Albany Marjoribanks
- Succeeded by: Francis Scott

Personal details
- Born: 15 December 1812
- Died: 30 January 1894 (aged 81)
- Party: Conservative/Tory

Sir Hugh Purves-Hume-Campbell, 7th Baronet (15 December 1812 – 30 January 1894) was a British Conservative and Tory politician.

== Life ==
He was born in 1812 and he was the son of William Purves-Hume-Campbell and Charlotte Rey. In 1834, he married Margaret Penelope Spottiswoode, daughter of John Spottiswoode and Helen Wauchope, and they had one child: Helen Purves-Hume-Campbell (c. 1835–1875). His second wife was Juliana Rebecca Fuller, daughter of Lt. General Sir Joseph Fuller, and granddaughter of General Sir John Floyd.

Purves-Hume-Campbell was first elected Tory MP for Berwickshire at a by-election in 1834—caused by the death of Charles Albany Marjoribanks—and held the seat until 1847, when he did not seek re-election. A keen cricketer, he played first-class cricket twice for the Marylebone Cricket Club in 1837, playing at Lord's against Oxford University and Cambridge University.

He succeeded to the Baronetcy of Purves Hall in 1833 upon the death of his father. Upon his own death in 1894, the title was inherited by John Home-Purves-Hume-Campbell.

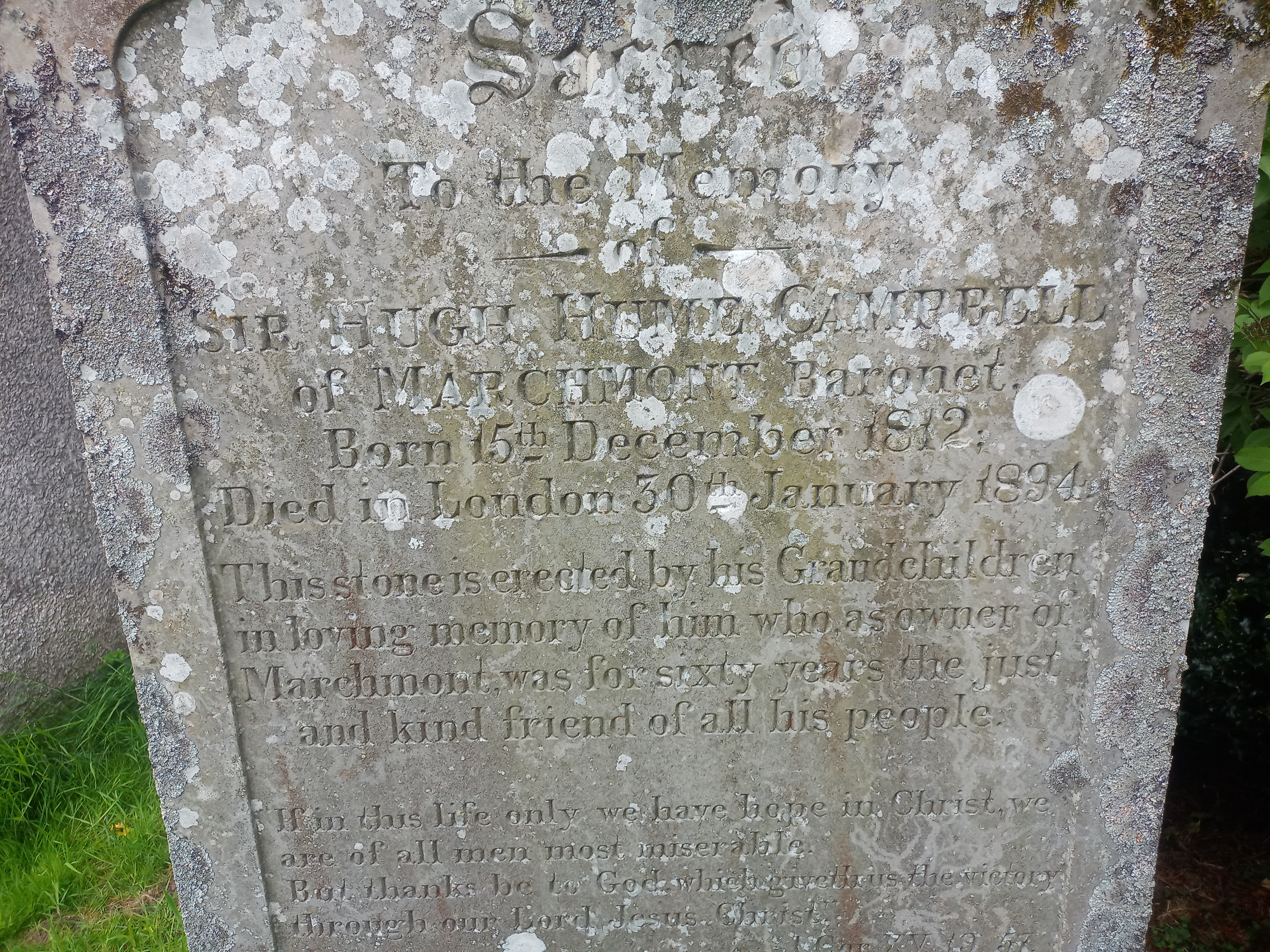
Grave in Polwarth Parish Church

Parliament of the United Kingdom
Preceded by Charles Albany Marjoribanks	Member of Parliament for Berwickshire; 1834–1847	Succeeded by Francis Scott
Baronetage of the United Kingdom
Preceded by William Purves-Hume-Campbell	Baronet (of Purves Hall); 1833–1894	Succeeded by John Home-Purves-Hume-Campbell
