= Sir John Paterson, 3rd Baronet =

Sir John Paterson 3rd Baronet

Member of Parliament for Berwickshire
- In office 15 April 1779 – September 1780
- Preceded by: Sir James Pringle, 4th Baronet
- Succeeded by: Hugh Hepburne-Scott, 6th Lord Polwarth

Personal details
- Died: 14 January 1782
- Spouse: Lady Anne Hume Campbell

Sir John Paterson, 3rd Baronet (c. 1730–1782) was a British politician who sat in the House of Commons in 1779 and 1780.

Paterson was the only son of John Paterson (younger) of Eccles and his wife Margaret Seton, daughter of Sir William Seton, 2nd Baronet of Pitmedden. Paterson's father had married without the consent of his father, Sir John Paterson, 2nd Baronet but was given an annual allowance. When John Paterson (younger) died in 1743 Sir John took the surviving sons into his care and replaced the allowance with smaller individual allowances to the wife and daughters. When Paterson succeeded his grandfather in the baronetcy on 14 December 1759 he took one of the sisters under his care and increased the allowance to his mother slightly. His mother and sisters took a case to court demanding larger allowances from Paterson. The court concluded that he should provide for his mother, but not for his sisters. He married Lady Anne Hume Campbell, daughter of Hugh Hume-Campbell, 3rd Earl of Marchmont on 23 October 1755. He was country landowner who cared well for his estates. Within the vicinity of Eccles there is a large stone monument on the site of a dreadful battle between the Percy and Douglas families, which Paterson wanted to move close to his mansion, but the stone was too deep-set to move. He did however pay for the removal of the old manse and offices from close to his house to the site of the rebuilt church It seems however an exaggeration on the basis of these accounts to conclude that Paterson's chief interests were embellishing his house and investigating local antiquities. Another account, probably by John Ramsay of Ochtertyre described Paterson as “not a popular character” and notorious for his gambling, ruthlessness and dissolute life.

Paterson was linked by marriage to the Marchmont interest and was returned as Member of Parliament for Berwickshire at a by-election on 15 April 1779. He supported Lord North but does not appear to have spoken in debate. At the 1780 general election he was faced by a challenge from other members of the Marchmont family and his nephew by marriage Hugh Hepburne-Scott stood against him. Scott won in a tough contest and Paterson petitioned, on the grounds of an illegal bargain between Scott and another candidate. The election was declared void, but Scott was re-elected at another poll.

Paterson died on 14 January 1782. The baronetcy became extinct on her death, but his daughter Anne married in 1778 Philip Anstruther who adopted the name Paterson.

Parliament of Great Britain
Preceded by James Pringle	Member of Parliament for Berwickshire; 1779–1780	Succeeded by Hugh Hepburne-Scott
Baronetage of Nova Scotia
Preceded by John Paterson	Baronet (of Eccles); 1751-1782	Extinct
