= George Liddell (MP) =

British Member of Parliament

Colonel George Liddell (1678–1740), of Eslington Park, Northumberland, was a British coal owner and Whig politician who sat in the House of Commons from 1727 to 1740. He was one of the dominant figures in the coal-business in the North East, and was a colonel in the militia who was active against the Jacobite threat.

== Early life ==
Liddell was baptized on 1 August 1678, the fourth son of Sir Henry Liddell, 3rd Baronet, MP of Ravensworth, and his wife Catherine Bright, daughter of Sir John Bright, 1st Baronet, of Badsworth, Yorkshire. Liddell's family had inherited lands containing coal, and he became a leading protagonist among the coal-owners.

== Militia and coal owner ==
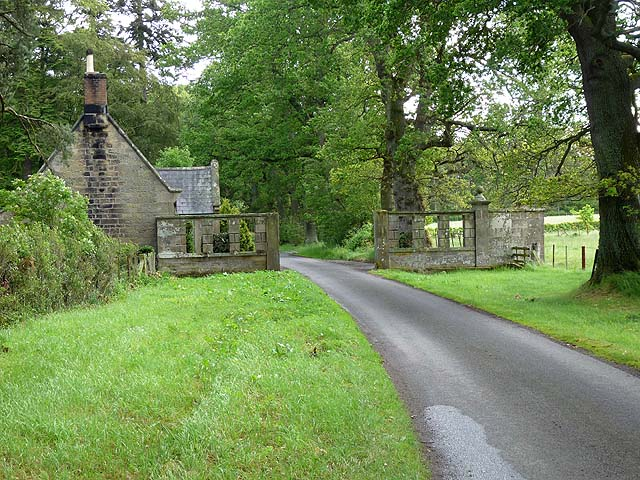
East Lodge of Eslington Park

Liddell became a Colonel in the militia and was involved in taking military precautions at the time of the Jacobite rising of 1715. He remained anti-Jacobite and was on the alert for further threats of action. After 1716 Liddell purchased Eslington Park which was forfeited to the Crown by George Collingwood for his treasonable part in the Jacobite rebellion. He built a new two-storey nine-bay mansion house on the site in about 1720. He was a very capable businessman and became one of the leading players in the coal business, dealing with disputes with the Newcastle keelmen, who transported the coal by sea, and negotiating with other coal owners. In 1727, he was one of the founders of a cartel known as the Grand Allies which dominated the coal trade in the North for the rest of the century and in 1728 he became Governor of the Society of Hoastmen who had rights in the loading of coal.

== Political career ==
Liddell was on good terms with Walpole, and at the 1727 British general election, he was returned as Member of Parliament for Berwick-Upon-Tweed with the support of the government interest there. Walpole referred to him as ‘the wise man of the north’. Liddell voted with the Government in all recorded divisions. He was returned again at the 1734 British general election. He became involved in the matter of the forfeited Derwentwater estates of which the proceeds were to be used for the benefit of Greenwich Hospital. The undeveloped parts of the estate which included mines and woods were to be sold off. In 1739 Liddell appeared in the record as director for Greenwich Hospital of Lord Derwentwater's estates.

== Death and legacy ==
Liddell died unmarried on 9 October 1740. He left his estate to his nephew Henry Liddell, 1st Baron Ravensworth.

Parliament of Great Britain
Preceded by William Kerr; Henry Grey	Member of Parliament for Berwick-Upon-Tweed; 1727–1740; With: Joseph Sabine; Viscount Polwarth; The Viscount Barrington	Succeeded by Thomas Watson; The Viscount Barrington
