= Margaret Home, Lady Billie =

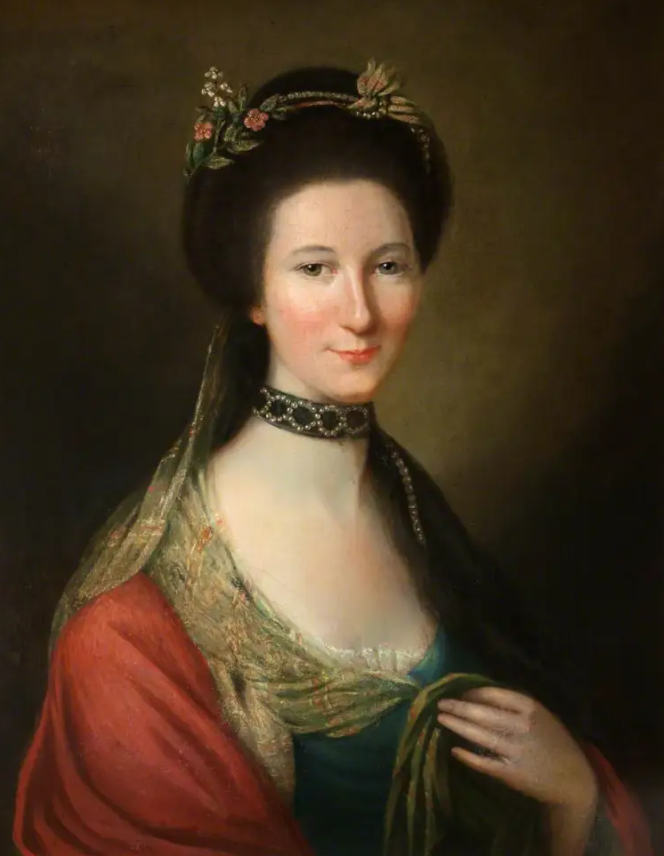
Margaret Home

Margaret Home Of Wedderburn (1700–1751) was a Scottish matriarch who managed her family's estates in Berwickshire and was murdered by her butler in 1751. Her death was a notorious event in Berwickshire history. She was the mother of Patrick Home.

== A Woman of Character and Resolve ==
Margaret's character shines through her handling of the precarious family situation following the 1715 Jacobite Rising. Her father was captured and condemned for treason, which resulted in the forfeiture of the family lands. The estates were saved when her cousin claimed he held the mortgage as security for a debt. This claim was upheld, and he solidified his control by marrying Margaret, the heiress, in an arrangement designed to keep the property within the wider family.

== Murder ==
Margaret Home's life is often overshadowed by the manner of her death. On the night of 12 August 1751, her confidential servant, a butler named Norman Ross, broke into her bedroom intending to steal money from a cabinet. Margaret woke up during the burglary, and Ross cut her throat before escaping. She survived for a few days before dying on 16 August 1751, in Berwickshire. Norman Ross was captured and tried; he became one of the last men in Scotland to be sentenced to hang in chains as punishment for the crime.
