= Edward Marjoribanks =

Edward Marjoribanks may refer to:

- Edward Marjoribanks, 2nd Baron Tweedmouth (1849–1909), British Liberal Party politician, MP 1880–1894, held senior posts in several liberal governments
- Edward Marjoribanks (Conservative politician) (1900–1932), British Conservative Member of Parliament for Eastbourne 1929–1932
