= Marjoribanks baronets =

Set index for Marjoribanks baronets

There have been two baronetcies created for persons with the surname Marjoribanks, both in the Baronetage of the United Kingdom. Both creations are extinct.

- Marjoribanks baronets of Lees (1815)
- Marjoribanks baronets of Guisachan (1866): see Baron Tweedmouth
