= 1881 Berwick-upon-Tweed by-election =

By-election in the United Kingdom

In 1881, Dudley Marjoribanks, MP, was elevated to the peerage as Baron Tweedmouth. At the 26 October Berwick-upon-Tweed 1881 by-election, Hubert Jerningham defeated Henry Trotter by a then record margin, despite attacks on Jerningham for supporting the right of atheist Charles Bradlaugh, who had won in Northampton at the 1880 general election, to sit in Parliament.

Berwick-upon-Tweed by-election, 1881
Party	Candidate	Votes	%	±%
Liberal	Hubert Jerningham	1,046	66.41	+10.1
Conservative	Henry John Trotter	529	33.58	−10.1
Majority		517	32.82	+30.1
Turnout		1,575	79.2	−0.8 (est)
Registered electors		1,989		
Liberal hold		Swing	+10.1	
