= Charles William Gordon (MP) =

British army officer and Conservative politician

Member of Parliament for Berwick-upon-Tweed
- In office 2 May 1859 – 15 June 1863 Serving with Dudley Marjoribanks (August 1859–1863); Ralph Earle (May 1859–August 1859)
- Preceded by: Dudley Marjoribanks; John Stapleton
- Succeeded by: Dudley Marjoribanks; William Cargill

Personal details
- Born: 19 March 1817
- Died: 15 June 1863 (aged 46)
- Party: Conservative
- Parent(s): Charles Gordon; Elisabeth

Charles William Gordon (19 March 1817 – 15 June 1863) was a British army officer and Conservative politician. He was a captain in the Madras Light Infantry. He was the son of Charles Gordon of Fyvie Castle, a son of Alexander Gordon, Lord Rockville.

Gordon contested the 1857 general election, but was only elected Conservative MP for Berwick-upon-Tweed at the 1859 general election and held the seat until his death in 1863.

Parliament of the United Kingdom
Preceded by Dudley Marjoribanks; John Stapleton	Member of Parliament for Berwick-upon-Tweed; 1859–1863; With: Dudley Marjoribanks (August 1859–1863); Ralph Earle (May 1859–August 1859)	Succeeded by Dudley Marjoribanks; William Cargill
