= Ralph Earle (politician) =

British politician

Ralph Anstruther Earle (1835 – 10 June 1879) was a British Conservative Party politician.

== Early career ==
He came from a well-known Liverpool slave-trading family with a Whig background, and was educated at Harrow, before joining the British Foreign Service. While working as an attaché at the embassy in Paris, from 1857 he supplied Benjamin Disraeli, who was leading the opposition in the House of Commons, with secret diplomatic information to use against the government of Lord Palmerston.

== Political activity ==
Probably hoping Disraeli would become Foreign Secretary on a change of government, he became the politician's private secretary. Disraeli in fact became Chancellor of the Exchequer in 1858, and Earle served as his secretary for eight years.

Disraeli sent him to Paris in 1858, on a confidential mission to the Emperor Napoleon III, without consulting the Foreign Secretary, Malmesbury, in an unsuccessful attempt to influence events in Italy.

Earle was elected at the 1859 general election as a Member of Parliament (MP) for Berwick-upon-Tweed, but resigned from the House of Commons the same year, taking the Chiltern Hundreds on 12 August 1859, under a bargain with his electoral opponent.

He returned to Parliament at the 1865 general election, when he was elected as one of the two MPs for Maldon in Essex.

After a further spell in opposition, he accepted the post of Parliamentary Secretary to the Poor Law Board when the Conservatives returned to office in 1866, and Disraeli ceased using him as his confidant. In 1867 he rebelled against the government over the Reform Act and resigned. He did not stand for the Commons again when Maldon's representation was reduced to one seat at the 1868 general election.

== Later life ==
Having left Parliament, he became agent for Baron Hirsch in his Turkish railway negotiations, earning £10,000 in commission (worth some £1.2 million today). He was said to be the writer of articles in 1878 attacking Disraeli in the Fortnightly Review, though he denied this. When he died the next year, aged 44, he left some £40,000.

== Earle family ==
Many of his relatives were slave traders, they include William Earle, Thomas Earle and Hardman Earle.

== Sources ==
- Earle, T. Algernon (1890). Earle of Allerton Tower.

Parliament of the United Kingdom
Preceded by John Stapleton and Charles William Gordon	Member of Parliament for Berwick-upon-Tweed; 1859; With: Charles William Gordon	Succeeded by Charles William Gordon and Dudley Marjoribanks
Preceded by Thomas Western; George Peacocke	Member of Parliament for Maldon; 1865–1868; With: George Peacocke	Succeeded by Edward Hammond Bentall
