= Rocking Chair Ranche Company, Limited =

Coordinates: 34.9594°N 100.2222°W

The Rocking Chair Ranche Company, Limited was a ranch located at North Elm Creek in Collingsworth County, Texas, from 1883 to 1896.

== History ==
The 200,000-acre (810 km^{2}) Rocking Chair Ranche was bought by Dudley Majoribanks, The 1st Baron Tweedmouth in 1883. After his death in 1894, it was owned by his son, Edward, The 2nd Baron Tweedmouth, and the 1st Baron's son-in-law, John Hamilton-Gordon, The 7th Earl of Aberdeen.

They sold it to the Continental Land and Cattle Company in December 1896.

== Owners ==
Dudley gave his youngest son Archibald an annual living allowance of £400 and sent him to Texas to work as the assistant ranch manager and bookkeeper. When Archibald's sister and brother-in-law, Lord and Lady Aberdeen, visited Archibald in the summer of 1887 they found him living in the one-bedroom wood frame house he shared with the ranch manager, J. John Drew. The Aberdeens slept in the bedroom during their stay while Archibald and the ranch manager slept on the terrace. Archibald suggested renaming the closest township to the ranch after them. He had no head for stock-raising and by 1893 the ranch had failed.
