= May Tennant =

Irish labour activist

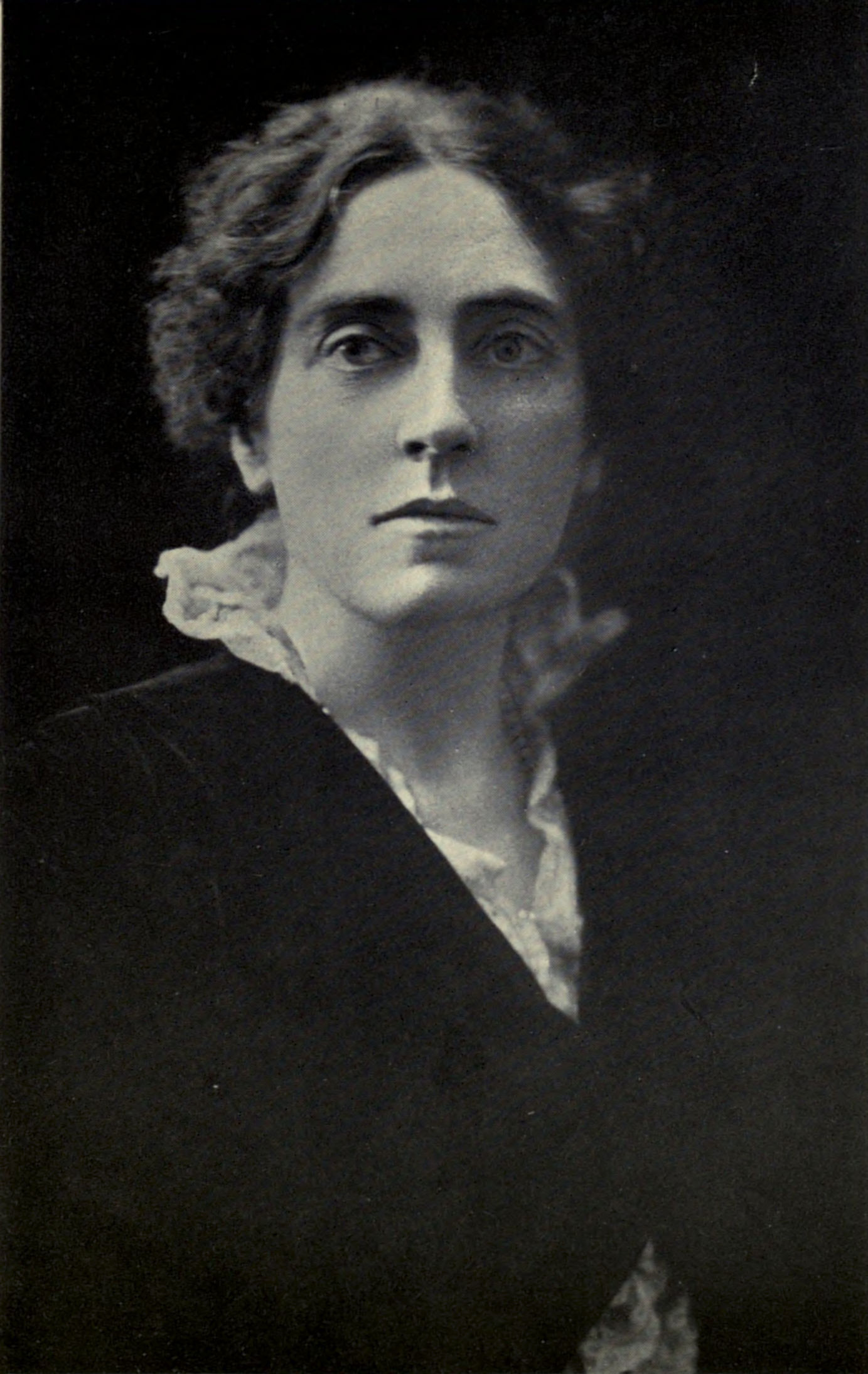
May Tennant ca. 1918

Margaret Edith (May) Tennant, CH (1869 – 11 July 1946), née Abraham, born in Rathgar, County Dublin, Ireland, was a civil servant, trade unionist, factory inspector, and campaigner, who worked to improve conditions for industrial workers and was also involved in women's health and education. She was one of the first people to be appointed to the Order of the Companions of Honour in 1917.

== Early life ==
May was born and raised in Rathgar, a neighbourhood in Dublin County. Her father, Dr. George W. Abraham, was a Dublin lawyer. He died in 1887, leaving the family impoverished but not without connections. With a letter of introduction to Lady Dilke, May left Rathgar and moved to London in search of employment.

== Trade unionism ==
In London she became secretary to Emilia, Lady Dilke, who was a leader of the Women's Trade Union League, an organisation of which Tennant became treasurer. She supported the London Dock Strike of 1889 and helped organise laundresses.

In 1891 she was appointed to the Royal Commission on Labour, set up to investigate the poor conditions faced by industrial workers, as one of four women assistant commissioners.

== Factory inspector ==
H. H. Asquith decided to appoint women factory inspectors in 1893, and she was one of his first choices, soon superintending a team of five women inspectors. In this position, she was known for her good humour which helped relations with factory managers. In 1895, she joined the Departmental Committee on Dangerous Trades. She wrote a book on factory legislation in 1896, The Laws Relating to Factories and Workshops, Including Laundries and Docks.

== Marriage ==
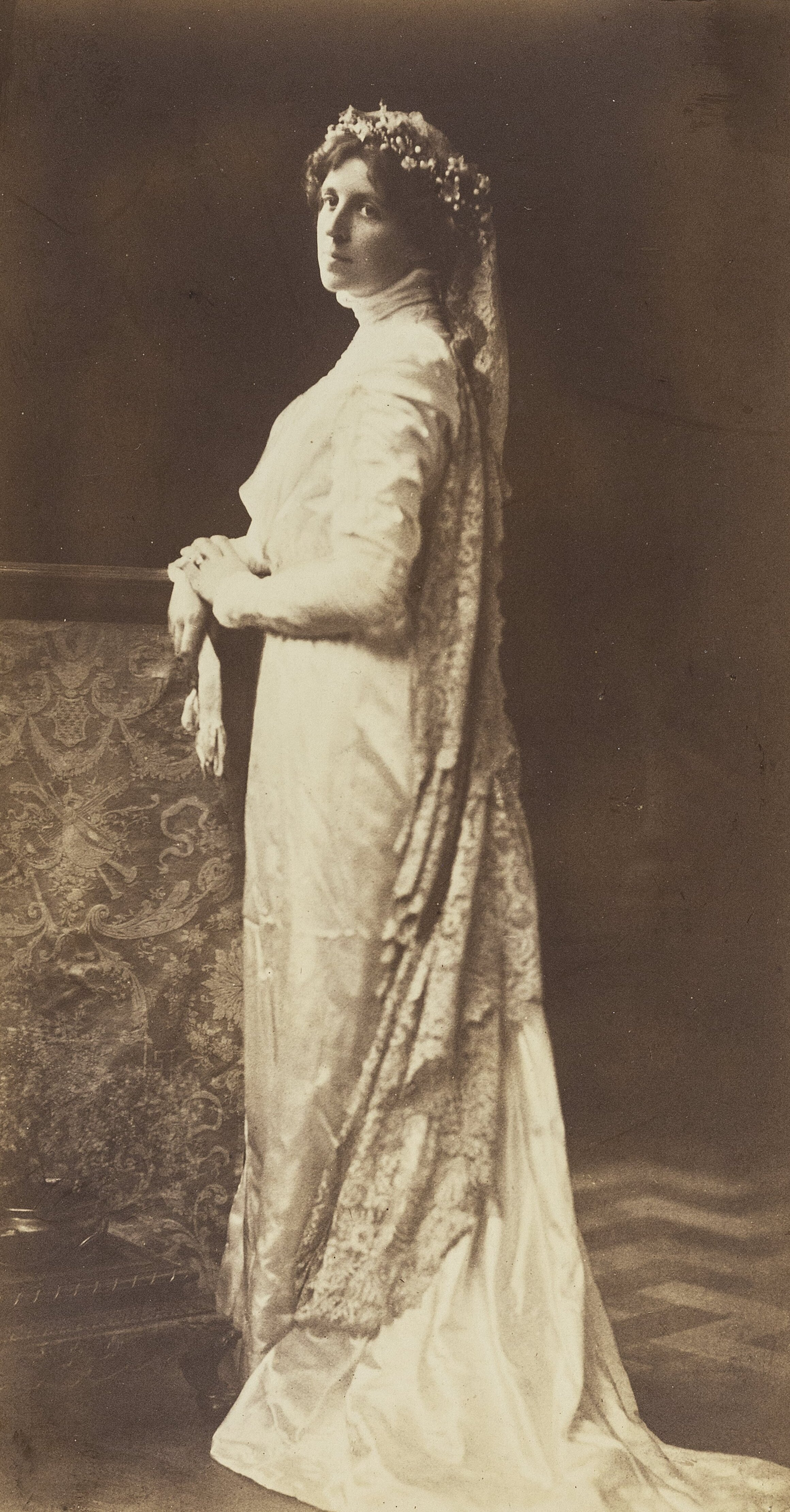
May Tennant at her wedding

In 1896 she married Harold Tennant, brother-in-law of and parliamentary secretary to Asquith, and chairman of the Departmental Committee on Dangerous Trades. She resigned in 1897 shortly before the birth of her first son, to devote herself to her family. She went on to have five children. Her eldest son, Henry, was killed in battle in 1917 during World War I.

Her children included:

- Henry (b. 1898)
- John (b. 1900)
- Alison Margaret (b. 1904)
- Archibald (b. 1908)

== Later work ==
Despite her new family life, she did not give up her work entirely, remaining on the Committee on Dangerous Trades and in 1899 she became chairman of the Industrial Law Indemnity Fund, which provided compensation to victimised workers. She was on the Royal Commission on Divorce in 1909, and was a founder and treasurer of the Central Committee for Women's Employment.

During World War I, she took on more work: she worked initially for the War Office as welfare advisor, then briefly in the Women's Department of the National Service Department, before moving to the Ministry of Munitions. After the war, she reduced her workload, but still served on committees on maternal mortality and maternal health. She was also a governor of Bedford College in London, an institution founded for the education of women that was part of the University of London. From 1941 she was closely involved in campaigning for the Royal Air Force Benevolent Fund.

== Private life ==
She and her husband bought and rebuilt a country house, Great Maytham, at Rolvenden, Kent, a property whose old walled garden had earlier been the inspiration for The Secret Garden by Frances Hodgson Burnett. Tennant herself developed expertise as a gardener, becoming prominent in the Royal Horticultural Society. Her husband died in 1935 and she died at Great Maytham on 11 July 1946.
