= Francis Scott (British politician) =

British politician

Francis Scott (31 January 1806, Mertoun, Berwickshire – 9 March 1884, Send Hurst near Guildford) was a British politician.

Scott was the youngest son of Hugh Scott, 6th Lord Polwarth. Educated at Trinity College, Cambridge, he read for the bar at the Middle Temple. In 1835 he married the daughter of the Rev. Charles Boultbee. He was MP for Roxburghshire from 1841 to 1847, and for Berwickshire from 1847 to 1859. Between 1844 and 1851, Scott acted as the Parliamentary Agent for the New South Wales, representing the interests of the New South Wales Legislative Council in the House of Commons. From 1866 to 1876 he was master of the Surrey Union hounds, and actively promoted the Hunt Servants' Benefit Society.

Parliament of the United Kingdom
Preceded by John Edmund Elliot	Member of Parliament for Roxburghshire; 1841 – 1847	Succeeded by John Edmund Elliot
Preceded by Sir Hugh Purves-Hume-Campbell	Member of Parliament for Berwickshire; 1847 – 1859	Succeeded by David Robertson
