= Sir William Miller, 1st Baronet =

British Vice-Consul

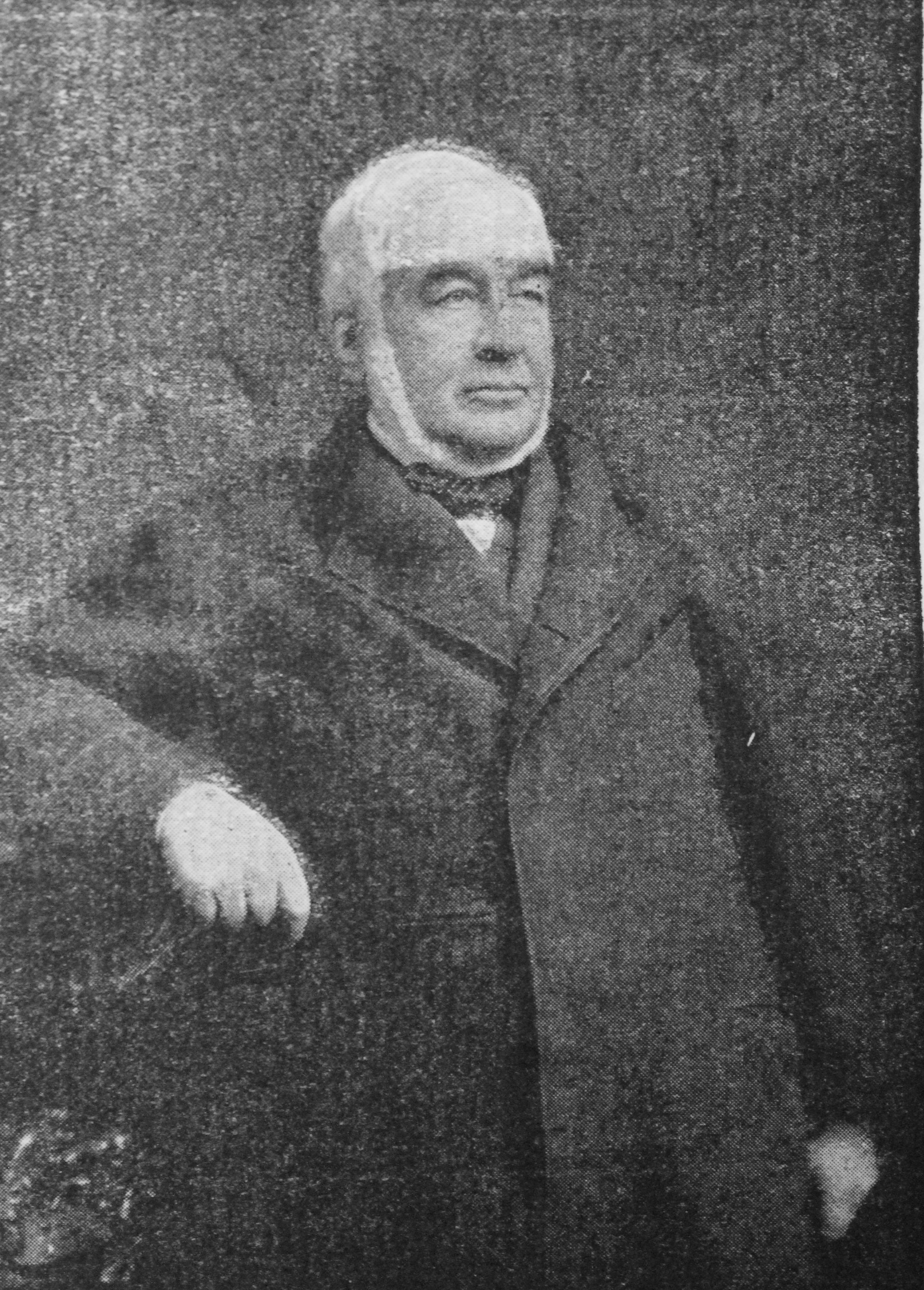
Sir William Miller

Sir William Miller, 1st Baronet, of Manderston, Berwickshire (25 March 1809 – 10 October 1887) was a British Vice-Consul at Saint Petersburg in 1842–54, and a Member of Parliament for Leith Burghs in 1859–1868, for Berwickshire 1873/74, and an armiger.

== Life ==
The son of James Miller (1775–1855) a merchant in Leith originally from Wick, by his spouse Elizabeth (d. 1862), daughter of Reverend William Sutherland, minister in Wick, he followed in his father's footsteps as a merchant trading in Imperial Russia representing the firm of James Miller & Sons, trading in iron, bricks and herring. He set up a new firn based in Russia named William Miller & Co, exporting hemp, tallow and grain back to the United Kingdom. He also founded a brewery in Russia based on Scottish brewing methods. He was later appointed honorary British Vice Consul at St Petersburg. He continued this role for 16 years, stepping down just prior to the Crimean War in 1853, when he moved his business interests into shipping.

He first stood for parliament, to represent Leith Burghs, in 1857 but on this attempt lost to James Moncreiff, 1st Baron Moncreiff. When the latter moved to represent the seat of Edinburgh, Miller won the election against R A Macfie of Dreghorn. He sat in this seat 1865 to 1868 when he lost the seat to Macfie.

From 1864 he lived on the huge Manderston estate in Berwickshire, previously belonging to a brother. In 1873 he contested and won the seat of Berwickshire by a majority of only 15 against Lord Dunglass. In 1874 he lost the seat to R. Bailie Hamilton. Following this. William Gladstone confirmed a baronetcy on Miller. Around the same time he became a major shareholder and Director of North British Railway. He was also director of the British Linen Bank, and chairman of the Northern Assurance Company.

In Leith he was responsible for creation of the Albert Dock and rolled out a series of public drinking fountains. He was the primary patron of Leith Public Institute. A marble bust of Miller was placed in the entrance of the institute.

He died on 10 October 1887. His death is marked by both a stained glass window and large wall memorial in South Leith Parish Church.

== Coat of Arms ==
In an Ordinary of Scottish Arms (by Sir James Balfour Paul, Edinburgh 1903), the arms of William Miller, merchant, St.Petersburg (1853), were given as Argent, a cross moline azure square-pierced of the field within a bordure gules, on a chief of the last a garb between two mullets or.

== Family ==
On 11 November 1858, Sir William Miller married Mary Anne Leith (1836–1912), daughter of John Farley Leith, Member of Parliament for Aberdeen, and they had issue:

- Sir James Miller, 2nd Baronet of Manderston.
- Sir John Alexander Miller, 3rd Baronet of Manderston.
- Amy Elizabeth, who later inherited Manderston. She married, 1866, Major-General Thomas Manbourg Bailie, J.P. (1844 - 1918).
- Eveline (d.1946), married (1) 1866, Richard Hunter of Thurston, East Lothian (d. 1910); (2) 1919, Alfred Mitchell-Innes, of the Diplomatic Service (1864 - 1950).

Parliament of the United Kingdom
Preceded by James Moncreiff	Member of Parliament for Leith Burghs; 1859–1868	Succeeded by Robert Andrew Macfie
Preceded by David Robertson	Member of Parliament for Berwickshire; 1873–1874	Succeeded by Robert Baillie-Hamilton
Baronetage of the United Kingdom
New creation	Baronet (of Manderston, Berwickshire); 1874–1887	Succeeded by James Miller
