= John Marjoribanks =

Scottish MP and Lord Provost of Edinburgh

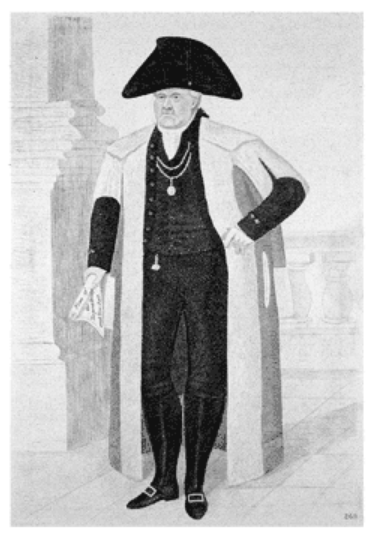
Sir John Marjoribanks, Lord Provost

Sir John Marjoribanks, 1st Baronet (13 January 1763 – 5 February 1833) was a Scottish MP and twice Lord Provost of Edinburgh.

== Life ==
He was born in Bordeaux, France on 13 January 1763, the eldest son of Edward Marjoribanks, of Hallyards and Lees (near Coldstream), a prominent wine merchant in Bordeaux, and Grizel Stewart, daughter of Archibald Stewart who was Lord Provost and MP for Edinburgh during the Jacobite rising of 1745, and then tried for high treason and acquitted. Sir John's brother, Campbell Marjoribanks became Chairman of the East India Company; his brother, London merchant Stewart owned a shipping company and became MP for Hythe; his brother Edward a partner in the bank Coutts & Co.; and his brother James was a judge in the East India Company. His family returned to Scotland from Bordeaux in 1770/1771 when the father inherited the estate of Lees.

Marjoribanks was a captain in the Coldstream Guards, became MP for Buteshire at the general election of 1812 and in 1814 served as Lord Provost of Edinburgh. He was instrumental in getting Regent Bridge built in Edinburgh. He was created a Baronet by patent on 6 May 1815. At this time he was living at 12 Charlotte Square.

In 1818 he was elected to Parliament for Berwickshire, which he continued to represent during two Parliaments until the dissolution in 1826. He was Provost of Edinburgh for a second time in 1825.

He died at the Lees, Berwickshire, aged 70 on 5 February 1833.

== Family ==
Marjoribanks married Allison, eldest daughter of William Ramsay, of Barnton House, west of Edinburgh, on 15 April 1791; the couple had four sons and five daughters:

- Edward (January 1792 – January 1833).
- Sir William Marjoribanks, 2nd Baronet (15 December 1792 - 22 September 1834), who became a captain in the East India Company navy and married Mary, eldest daughter of Henry Stone, a London banker.
- Charles (1794 – 3 December 1833), a civil servant of the East India Company in China, and later MP for Berwickshire.
- Janet, who in 1816 married Robert Shuttleworth, of Gawthorpe Hall in Lancashire, who died in 1818 leaving an only daughter Janet as his sole heiress; and secondly in 1825, to Frederick North, of Rougham, Norfolk.
- David (1797–1873), who became a merchant in London, was Lord Lieutenant of Berwickshire and later elevated to the peerage as Baron Marjoribanks of Ladykirk.
- Rachael, who in 1823 married Josiah Nesbit of the Madras civil service.
- Agnes, who in 1818 married Sir Edward Poore, of Rushall, Wiltshire.
- Mary, who in 1826 married John Murray Nasmyth, only son of Sir James Nasmyth, 2nd Baronet, of Posso, Peebles.
- Susan, who in 1824 married Charles Craigie Halkett of the Halkett baronets.

Baronetage of the United Kingdom
| New creation | Baronet (of Lees); 1815–1833 | Succeeded by William Marjoribanks |
