= Berwickshire (UK Parliament constituency) =

Parliamentary constituency in the United Kingdom, 1801–1918

- Former county constituency for the House of Commons
- Subdivisions of Scotland: Berwickshire

1708–1918
- Seats: One
- Replaced by: Berwick & Haddington

Berwickshire was a county constituency of the House of Commons of the Parliament of the United Kingdom from 1708 to 1918, when it was amalgamated with neighbouring Haddington(shire) to form a new Berwick and Haddington constituency.

== Creation ==
The British parliamentary constituency was created in 1708 following the Acts of Union, 1707 and replaced the former Parliament of Scotland shire constituency of Berwickshire. It elected one Member of Parliament (MP), using the first-past-the-post voting system.

== Members of Parliament ==
Election	Member	Party
1708	George Baillie	
1734	Hon. Alexander Hume-Campbell	
1761	James Pringle	
1779	Sir John Paterson, Bt	
1780	Hugh Hepburne-Scott	
1784	Patrick Home	
1796	George Baillie	
1818	Sir John Marjoribanks	Tory
1826	Anthony Maitland	Tory
1832	Charles Albany Marjoribanks	Whig
Jan. 1834	Sir Hugh Purves-Hume-Campbell	Tory
Dec. 1834	Sir Hugh Purves-Hume-Campbell	Conservative
1847	Francis Scott	Conservative
1859	David Robertson	Liberal
1873 by-election	William Miller	Liberal
1874	Hon. Robert Baillie-Hamilton	Conservative
1880	Edward Marjoribanks	Liberal
1894 by-election	Harold Tennant	Liberal
1918	constituency abolished	

== Election results ==
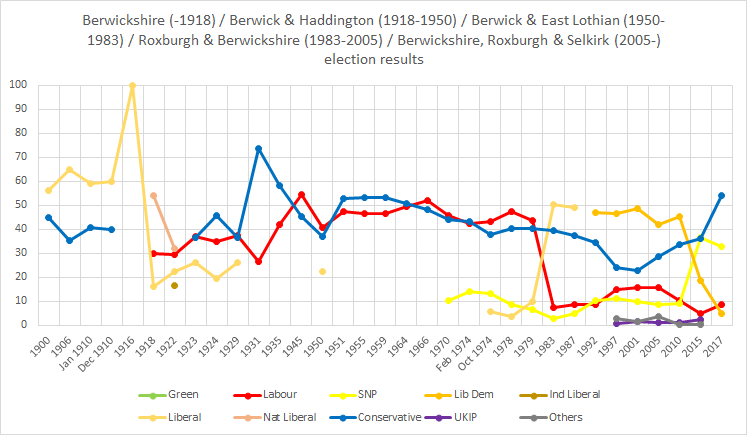
Berwickshire constituencies electoral history

=== Elections in the 1830s ===
General election 1830: Berwickshire
Party	Candidate	Votes	%
Tory	Anthony Maitland, 10th Earl of Lauderdale	Unopposed	
Registered electors		149	
Tory hold			

General election 1831: Berwickshire
Party	Candidate	Votes	%
Tory	Anthony Maitland, 10th Earl of Lauderdale	Unopposed	
Registered electors		c. 149	
Tory hold			

General election 1832: Berwickshire
Party	Candidate	Votes	%
Whig	Charles Albany Marjoribanks	478	53.8
Tory	Anthony Maitland, 10th Earl of Lauderdale	410	46.2
Majority		68	7.6
Turnout		888	84.3
Registered electors		1,053	
Whig gain from Tory			

Marjoribanks resigned, causing a by-election.

By-election, 13 January 1834: Berwickshire
Party	Candidate	Votes	%
Tory	Hugh Purves-Hume-Campbell	Unopposed	
Tory gain from Whig			

General election 1835: Berwickshire
Party	Candidate	Votes	%	±%
Conservative	Hugh Purves-Hume-Campbell	507	61.0	+14.8
Whig	Francis Blake	324	39.0	−14.8
Majority		183	22.0	N/A
Turnout		831	77.6	−6.7
Registered electors		1,071		
Conservative gain from Whig		Swing	+14.8	

General election 1837: Berwickshire
Party	Candidate	Votes	%
Conservative	Hugh Purves-Hume-Campbell	Unopposed	
Registered electors		1,244	
Conservative hold			

=== Elections in the 1840s ===
General election 1841: Berwickshire
Party	Candidate	Votes	%	±%
Conservative	Hugh Purves-Hume-Campbell	Unopposed		
Registered electors		1,319		
Conservative hold				

General election 1847: Berwickshire
Party	Candidate	Votes	%	±%
Conservative	Francis Scott	Unopposed		
Registered electors		1,238		
Conservative hold				

=== Elections in the 1850s ===
General election 1852: Berwickshire
Party	Candidate	Votes	%	±%
Conservative	Francis Scott	Unopposed		
Registered electors		1,073		
Conservative hold				

General election 1857: Berwickshire
Party	Candidate	Votes	%	±%
Conservative	Francis Scott	394	56.4	N/A
Whig	David Robertson	305	43.6	New
Majority		89	12.8	N/A
Turnout		699	63.4	N/A
Registered electors		1,102		
Conservative hold		Swing	N/A	

General election 1859: Berwickshire
Party	Candidate	Votes	%	±%
Liberal	David Robertson	461	51.9	+8.3
Conservative	John Marjoribanks	428	48.1	−8.3
Majority		33	3.8	N/A
Turnout		889	74.0	+10.6
Registered electors		1,201		
Liberal gain from Conservative		Swing	+8.3	

=== Elections in the 1860s ===
General election 1865: Berwickshire
Party	Candidate	Votes	%	±%
Liberal	David Robertson	Unopposed		
Registered electors		1,247		
Liberal hold				

General election 1868: Berwickshire
Party	Candidate	Votes	%	±%
Liberal	David Robertson	Unopposed		
Registered electors		1,580		
Liberal hold				

=== Elections in the 1870s ===
Robertson was elevated to the peerage, becoming Lord Marjoribanks and causing a by-election.

By-election, 30 June 1873: Berwickshire
Party	Candidate	Votes	%	±%
Liberal	William Miller	623	50.6	N/A
Conservative	Charles Douglas-Home	609	49.4	New
Majority		14	1.2	N/A
Turnout		1,232	77.2	N/A
Registered electors		1,595		
Liberal hold		Swing	N/A	

General election 1874: Berwickshire
Party	Candidate	Votes	%	±%
Conservative	Robert Baillie-Hamilton	748	52.6	N/A
Liberal	William Miller	674	47.4	N/A
Majority		74	5.2	N/A
Turnout		1,422	86.1	N/A
Registered electors		1,652		
Conservative gain from Liberal		Swing	N/A	

=== Elections in the 1880s ===
General election 1880: Berwickshire
Party	Candidate	Votes	%	±%
Liberal	Edward Marjoribanks	939	58.3	+10.9
Conservative	Robert Baillie-Hamilton	671	41.7	−10.9
Majority		268	16.6	N/A
Turnout		1,610	88.0	+1.9
Registered electors		1,830		
Liberal gain from Conservative		Swing	+10.9	

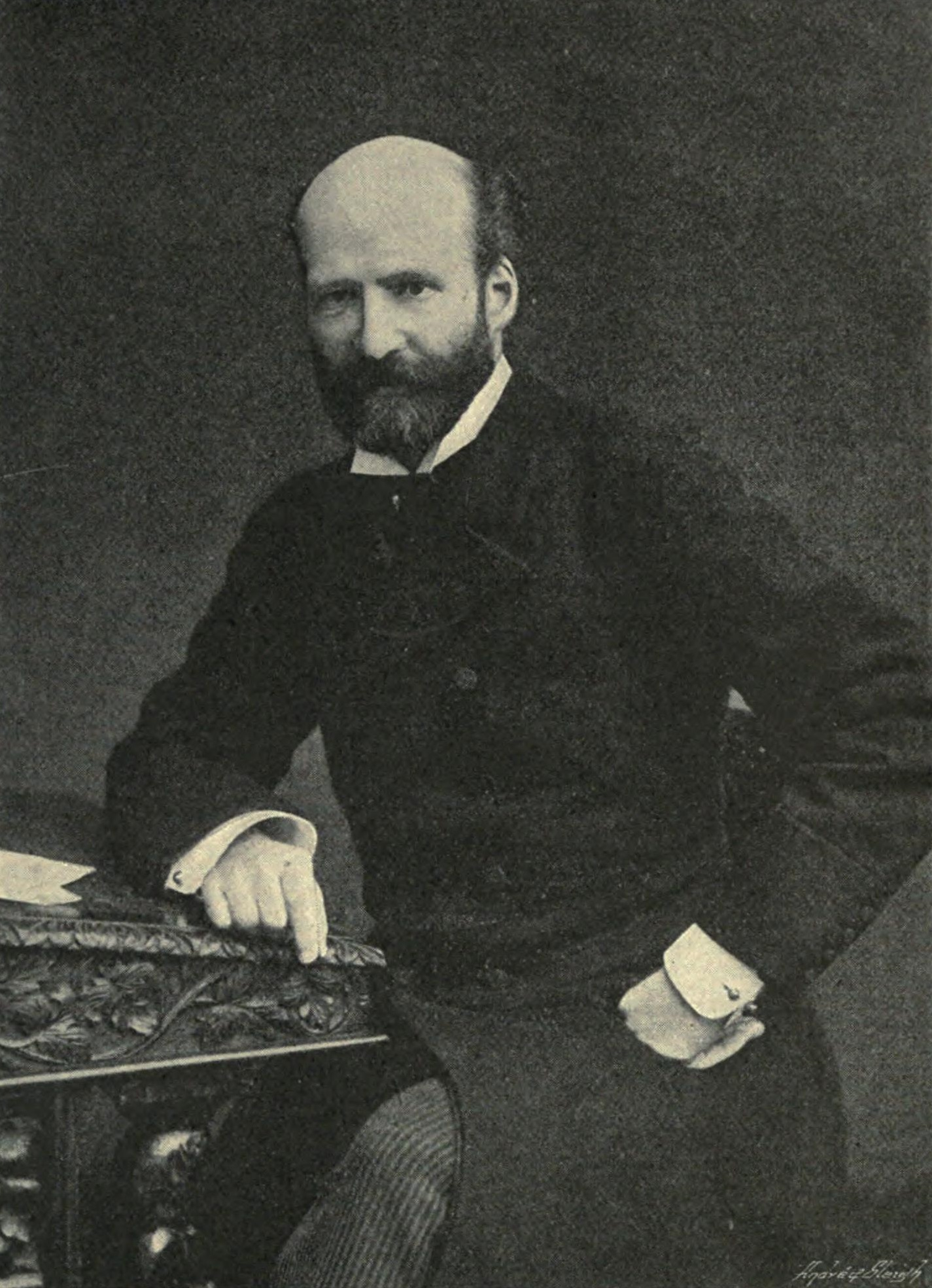
Marjoribanks

General election 1885: Berwickshire
Party	Candidate	Votes	%	±%
Liberal	Edward Marjoribanks	3,758	75.4	+17.1
Conservative	David Milne Home	1,225	24.6	−17.1
Majority		2,533	50.8	+34.2
Turnout		4,983	83.3	−4.7
Registered electors		5,982		
Liberal hold		Swing	+17.1	

Marjoribanks was appointed Comptroller of the Household, requiring a by-election.

By-election, 13 Feb 1886: Berwickshire
Party	Candidate	Votes	%	±%
Liberal	Edward Marjoribanks	Unopposed		
Liberal hold				

General election 1886: Berwickshire
Party	Candidate	Votes	%	±%
Liberal	Edward Marjoribanks	2,778	70.2	−5.2
Liberal Unionist	Robert Henry Elliot	1,177	29.8	+5.2
Majority		1,601	40.4	−10.4
Turnout		3,955	66.1	−17.2
Registered electors		5,982		
Liberal hold		Swing	-5.2	

=== Elections in the 1890s ===
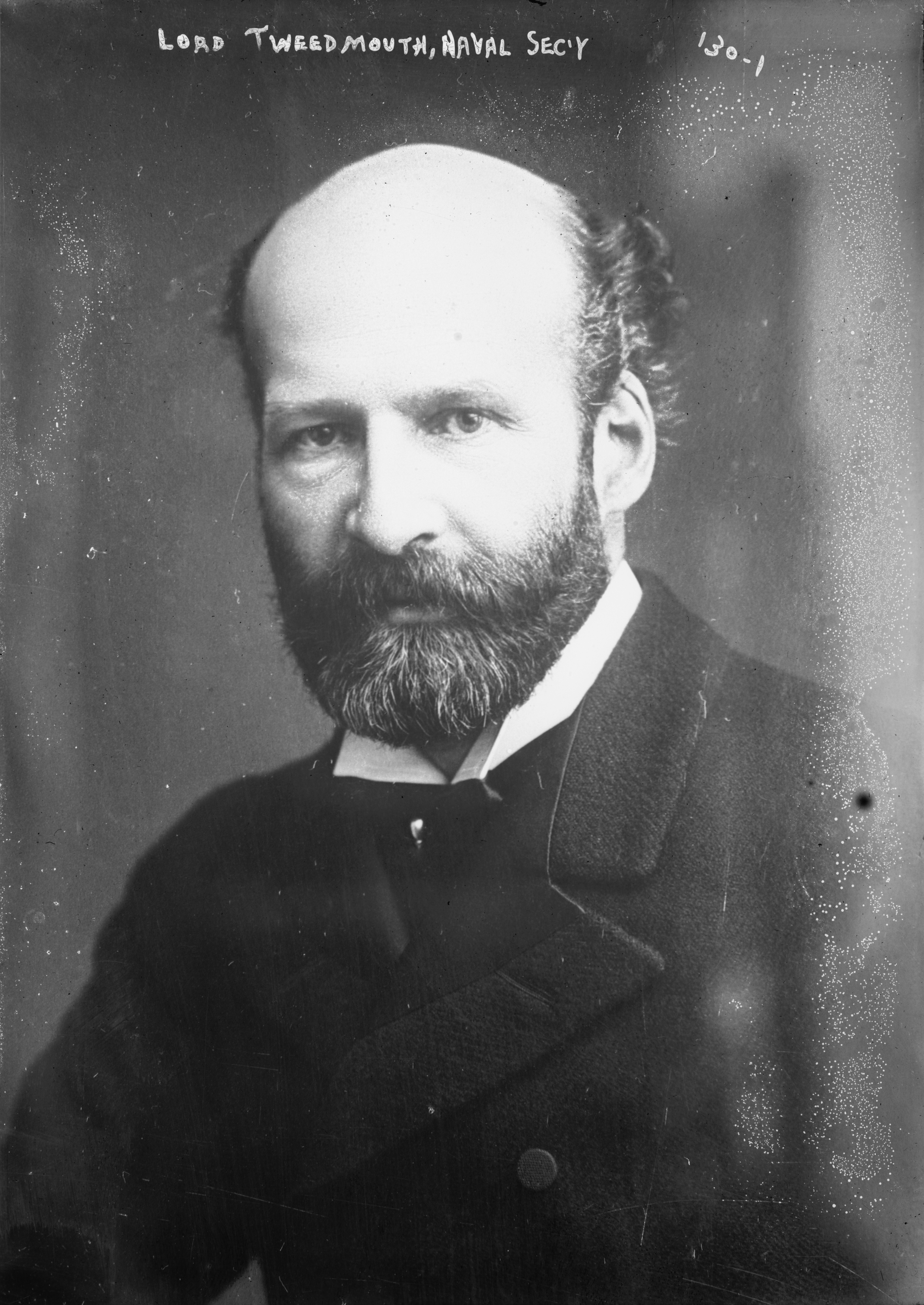
Marjoribanks

General election 1892: Berwickshire
Party	Candidate	Votes	%	±%
Liberal	Edward Marjoribanks	2,704	58.0	−12.2
Conservative	Charles Balfour	1,956	42.0	+12.2
Majority		748	16.0	−24.4
Turnout		4,660	82.6	+16.5
Registered electors		5,644		
Liberal hold		Swing	-12.2	

Tennant

1894 Berwickshire by-election
Party	Candidate	Votes	%	±%
Liberal	Harold Tennant	2,722	55.8	−2.2
Conservative	Charles Balfour	2,157	44.2	+2.2
Majority		507	10.4	−4.4
Turnout		4,879	89.7	+7.1
Registered electors		5,442		
Liberal hold		Swing	-2.2	

General election 1895: Berwickshire
Party	Candidate	Votes	%	±%
Liberal	Harold Tennant	2,673	55.2	−2.8
Conservative	Charles Balfour	2,166	44.8	+2.8
Majority		507	10.4	−5.6
Turnout		4,839	87.8	+5.2
Registered electors		5,509		
Liberal hold		Swing	−2.8	

=== Elections in the 1900s ===
General election 1900: Berwickshire
Party	Candidate	Votes	%	±%
Liberal	Harold Tennant	2,518	56.1	+0.9
Conservative	Charles Douglas-Home	1,968	43.9	−0.9
Majority		550	12.2	+1.8
Turnout		4,486	81.7	−6.1
Registered electors		5,492		
Liberal hold		Swing	+0.9	

General election 1906: Berwickshire
Party	Candidate	Votes	%	±%
Liberal	Harold Tennant	2,975	64.7	+8.6
Conservative	R. Fitzroy Bell	1,624	35.3	−8.6
Majority		1,351	29.4	+17.2
Turnout		4,599	83.6	+1.9
Registered electors		5,502		
Liberal hold		Swing	+8.6	

=== Elections in the 1910s ===
Seton-Karr

General election January 1910: Berwickshire
Party	Candidate	Votes	%	±%
Liberal	Harold Tennant	2,992	59.2	−5.5
Conservative	Henry Seton-Karr	2,060	40.8	+5.5
Majority		932	18.4	−11.0
Turnout		5,052	89.0	+5.4
Registered electors		5,674		
Liberal hold		Swing	-5.5	

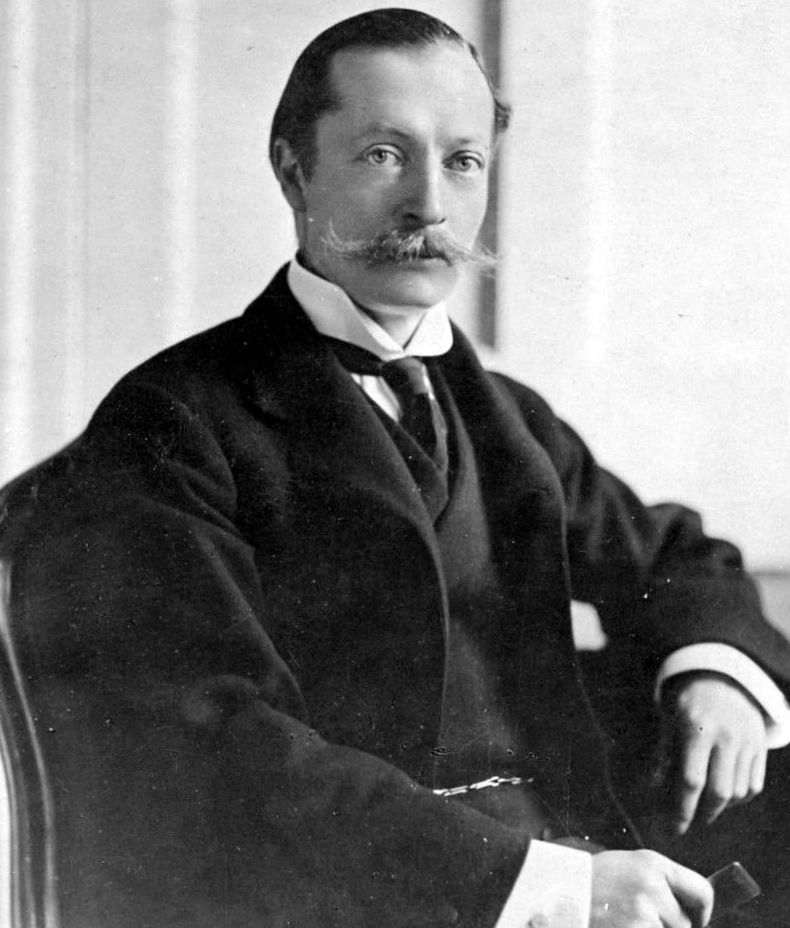
Tennant

General election December 1910: Berwickshire
Party	Candidate	Votes	%	±%
Liberal	Harold Tennant	3,005	60.0	+0.8
Conservative	John Campbell (Conservative politician)	2,000	40.0	−0.8
Majority		1,005	20.0	+1.6
Turnout		5,005	87.0	−2.0
Registered electors		5,752		
Liberal hold		Swing	+0.8	

By-election, 1916: Berwickshire
Party	Candidate	Votes	%	±%
Liberal	Harold Tennant	Unopposed		
Liberal hold				

== Sources ==
- Leigh Rayment's Historical List of MPs – Constituencies beginning with "B" (part 2)
