= Dudley Marjoribanks, 3rd Baron Tweedmouth =

British army officer and courtier

The Right Honourable The Lord Tweedmouth CMG MVO DSO
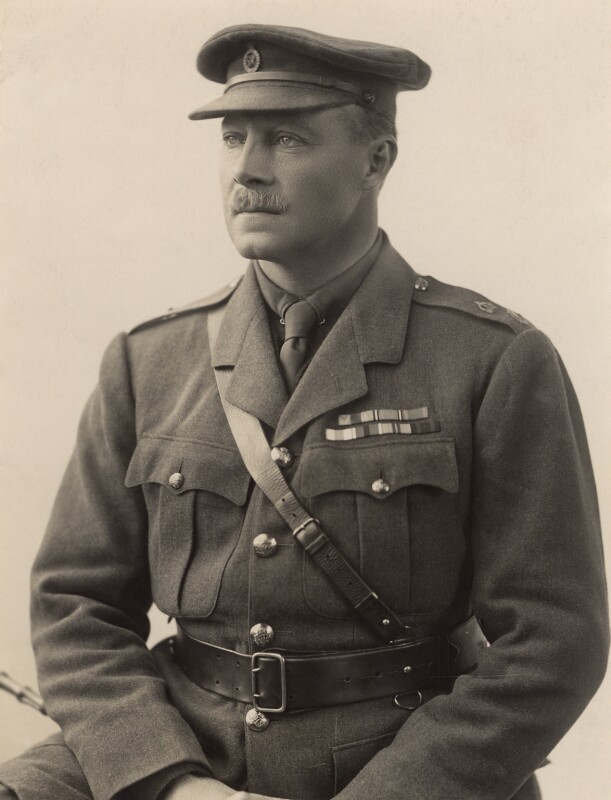
- Born: 2 February 1874
- Died: 23 April 1935 (aged 61)
- Spouse: Lady Muriel Brodrick (m. 1901)
- Children: The Hon. Moyra Marjoribanks; The Hon. Millicent Joan Marjoribanks
- Parent(s): Edward Marjoribanks, 2nd Baron Tweedmouth; Lady Fanny Octavia Louise Marjoribanks
- Military career
- Allegiance: United Kingdom
- Branch: British Army
- Service years: 1895–1919
- Rank: Lieutenant Colonel
- Units: Royal Horse Guards; Guards Machine Gun Regiment
- Conflicts: Second Boer War; First World War
- Awards: Companion of the Order of St Michael and St George; Member of the Royal Victorian Order; Distinguished Service Order; Mentioned in Despatches

Lieutenant-Colonel Dudley Churchill Marjoribanks, 3rd Baron Tweedmouth, CMG, MVO, DSO (2 March 1874 – 23 April 1935) was a British army officer and courtier.

== Early life ==
Marjoribanks was the son of Edward Marjoribanks, 2nd Baron Tweedmouth and Lady Fanny Spencer-Churchill, daughter of the 7th Duke of Marlborough. He succeeded his father as the 3rd Baron Tweedmouth and is thus descended from Joseph Marjoribanks, a wine and fish merchant in Edinburgh who died in 1635. Joseph Marjoribanks is thought to have been the grandson of Thomas Marjoribanks of Ratho, head of the lowland Clan Marjoribanks.

At the same time as his cousin Winston Churchill, he was a pupil at Harrow and joined the Royal Horse Guards in 1895.

== Career ==
In 1897, he was promoted to lieutenant and served with a composite regiment of the Household Cavalry in the Second Boer War in South Africa from 1899 to 1902. He was present at the Relief of Kimberly and several other battles in the Orange Free State, the Transvaal Colony and the Cape Colony. He was Mentioned in dispatches, was awarded the Queen's South Africa Medal with six clasps and was appointed a Companion of the Distinguished Service Order (DSO) on 29 November 1900.

In early 1901, the new King Edward VII asked him to take part in a special diplomatic mission to announce the King's accession to the governments of France, Spain, and Portugal. The following year, he was appointed a Member (fifth class) of the Royal Victorian Order (MVO). In September 1902, Marjoribanks accompanied Lord Roberts, Commander-in-Chief of the Forces, and St John Brodrick, Secretary of State for War (and his father-in-law), on a visit to Germany to attend the German army maneuvers as a guest of Emperor Wilhelm. He created a Knight 2nd class of the Prussian Order of the Red Eagle during the visit. Marjoribanks and his wife attended the 1903 Delhi Durbar to mark the accession of King Edward VII as Emperor of India.

He was promoted to captain in 1904, and from 1905 to 1908, he served as Military Secretary to the High Commissioner in South Africa. In 1908, he was promoted to major and was Director of Army Accounts and Quarter Master General for the West Lancashire Division from 1908 to 1910.

In the First World War, he served with the Royal Horse Guards from 1914 to 1918 and was involved in the early battles. On 25 October 1914, 'Beef' as he was known, was shot in the leg when trying to carry out a regimental action. "I had to stop and get into Hugh Grosvenor's trench. Got out presently and shot my horse with my revolver and saved all my kit. We were very lucky considering the fire we came in for." At the war's end, he served with the Guards Machine Gun Regiment from 1918 to 1919. During the war, he was promoted to lieutenant-colonel and created a Companion of the Order of St Michael and St George (CMG).

After succeeding as Lord Tweedmouth, he was Lord-in-waiting to King Edward VII and King George V.

He was said to be an excellent shot, having spent much time at his father's Glen Affric Shooting Estate, and had an amiable personality, but had financial difficulties throughout his life.

== Personal life ==
In 1895 Birdie Sutherland (an actress at the Gaiety Theatre, London) successfully sued Dudley Marjoribanks for £5,000 plus costs for breach of promise to marry her. Lord Tweedmouth married, at St George's, Hanover Square, London on 30 November 1901, Lady Muriel Brodrick (1881–1966), eldest daughter of St John Brodrick, 1st Earl of Midleton and Lady Hilda Charteris. They had two daughters, Moyra and Millicent Joan and the title Baron Tweedmouth became extinct on his death.

Peerage of the United Kingdom
Preceded by Edward Marjoribanks	Baron Tweedmouth; 1909–1935	Extinct
