= Harold Tennant =

British politician (1865–1935)

The Right Honourable Harold Tennant
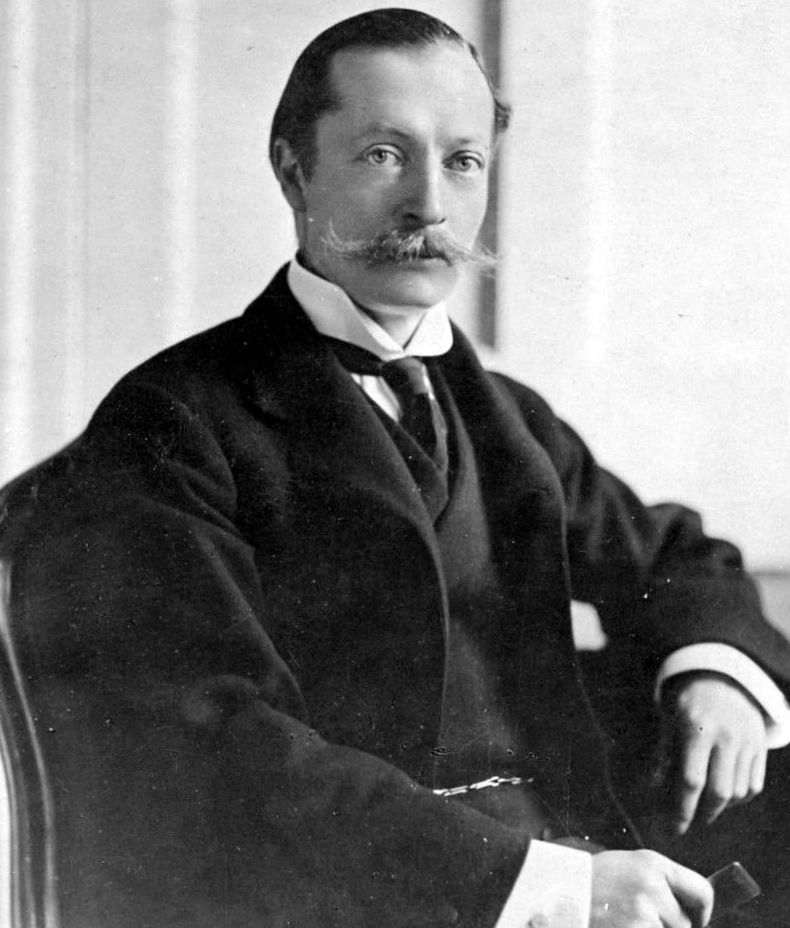
- Photo c. 1910s

Secretary for Scotland
- In office 9 July 1916 – 5 December 1916
- Monarch: George V
- Prime Minister: H. H. Asquith
- Preceded by: Thomas McKinnon Wood
- Succeeded by: Robert Munro

Personal details
- Born: 18 November 1865 The Glen, Innerleithen, Peeblesshire, Scotland
- Died: 9 December 1935 (aged 69)
- Party: Liberal
- Spouse: May Abraham (m. 1896)
- Parent(s): Sir Charles Tennant, 1st Baronet; Emma Winsloe
- Education: Trinity College, Cambridge

Harold John Tennant PC (18 November 1865 – 9 November 1935), often known as Jack Tennant, was a Scottish Liberal politician. He served as Secretary for Scotland under his brother-in-law H. H. Asquith between July and December 1916.

== Background and education ==
Born at The Glen, Innerleithen, Peeblesshire, Harold Tennant was a younger son of Sir Charles Tennant, 1st Baronet, by his first wife Emma, daughter of Richard Winsloe. He was the brother of Edward Tennant, 1st Baron Glenconner and Margot Asquith (and hence the brother-in-law of H. H. Asquith) and the half-brother of Baroness Elliot of Harwood.

Tennant was educated at Eton College and at Trinity College, Cambridge.

== Political career ==
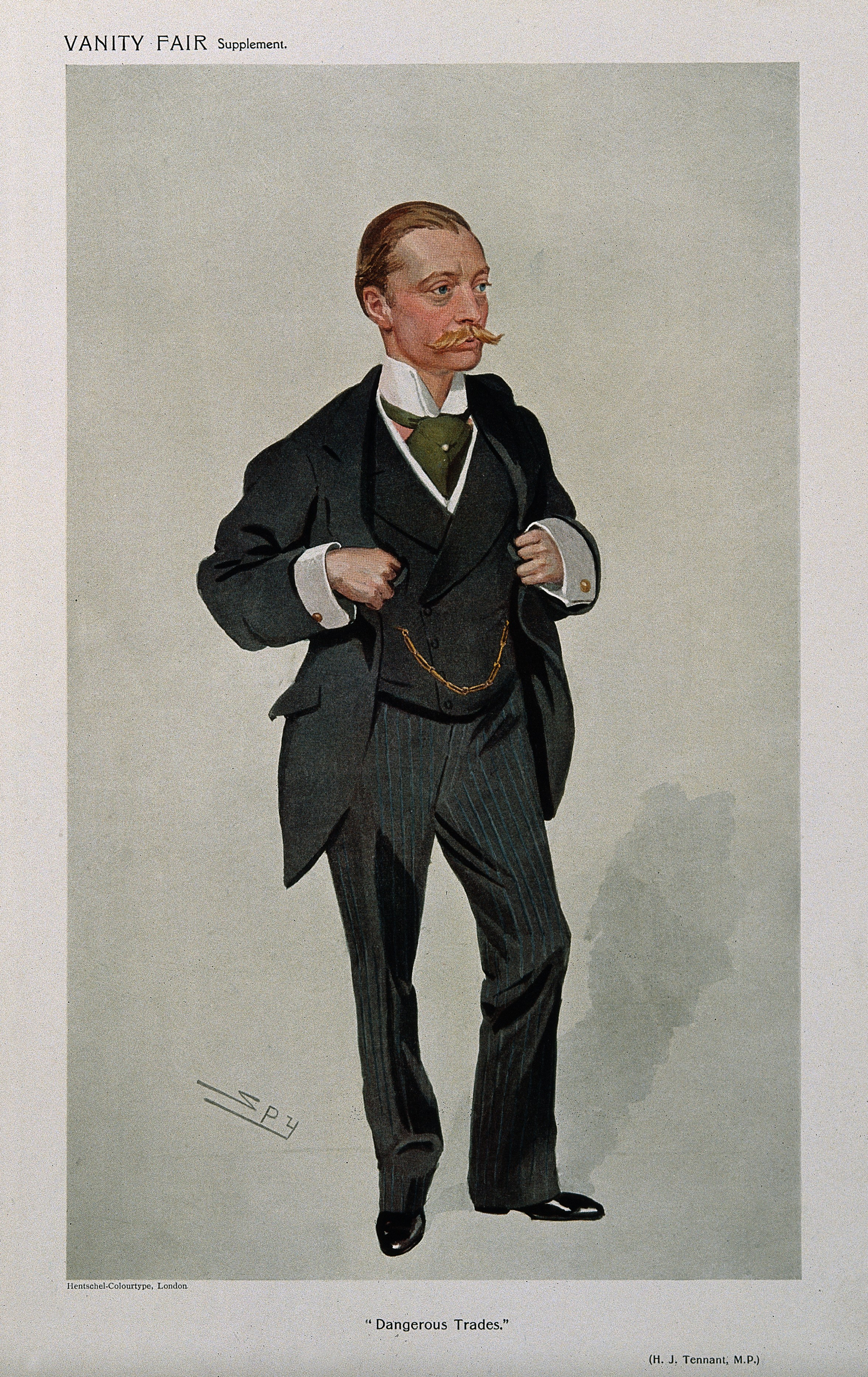
Tennant caricatured by Spy for Vanity Fair, 1909

Tennant was Assistant Private Secretary to his brother-in-law H. H. Asquith while the latter was Home Secretary between 1892 and 1895. In 1894 he was elected Member of Parliament for Berwickshire. Asquith became prime minister in 1908 and in January 1909 he appointed Tennant Parliamentary Secretary to the Board of Trade. Tennant remained in this office until 1911, and then served under Asquith as Financial Secretary to the War Office from 1911 to 1912 and as Under-Secretary of State for War from 1912 to 1916. In 1914 he was sworn of the Privy Council. He entered the cabinet as Secretary for Scotland under Asquith in July 1916, a post he held until Asquith was ousted as prime minister in December 1916. Tennant did not serve under David Lloyd George.

At the 1918 general election, the Berwickshire constituency was abolished, and Tennant contested the new Berwickshire and Haddingtonshire constituency. He faced two opponents: R. W. Foulis of the Labour Party, and the 1911–1918 Haddingtonshire MP John Deans Hope. With two incumbent Liberal MPs contesting one seat, Hope's receipt of the coalition coupon secured his victory, with 54% of the votes. Tennant came a poor third, with only 16% of the votes.

Tennant also unsuccessfully contested Glasgow Central in 1923 but never returned to the House of Commons.

During his time in Parliament, Tennant supported a number of progressive measures such as worker's compensation, minimum wage provisions, school medical inspections, factory inspections, and unemployment insurance.

== Personal life ==
Harold Tennant c.1895

Tennant married factory inspector May Abraham in 1896. He bought Great Maytham Hall, Rolvenden, Kent, in 1910. He commissioned Edwin Lutyens to rebuild the hall at a cost of £24,000. As leader of the war memorial committee, he also engaged Lutyens to design the Rolvenden War Memorial, erected in 1922.

Tennant died in November 1935, aged 70.

Parliament of the United Kingdom
Preceded by Hon. Edward Marjoribanks	Member of Parliament for Berwickshire; 1894–1918	Constituency renamed Berwick and Haddington
Political offices
Preceded by Hudson Kearley	Parliamentary Secretary to the Board of Trade; 1909–1911	Succeeded by J. M. Robertson
Preceded by Francis Dyke Acland	Financial Secretary to the War Office; 1911–1912	Succeeded by Harold Baker
Preceded by J. E. B. Seely	Under-Secretary of State for War; 1912–1916	Succeeded by The Earl of Derby
Preceded by Thomas McKinnon Wood	Secretary for Scotland; July–December 1916	Succeeded by Robert Munro
