= Hugh Hume-Campbell, 3rd Earl of Marchmont =

18th-century Scottish politician

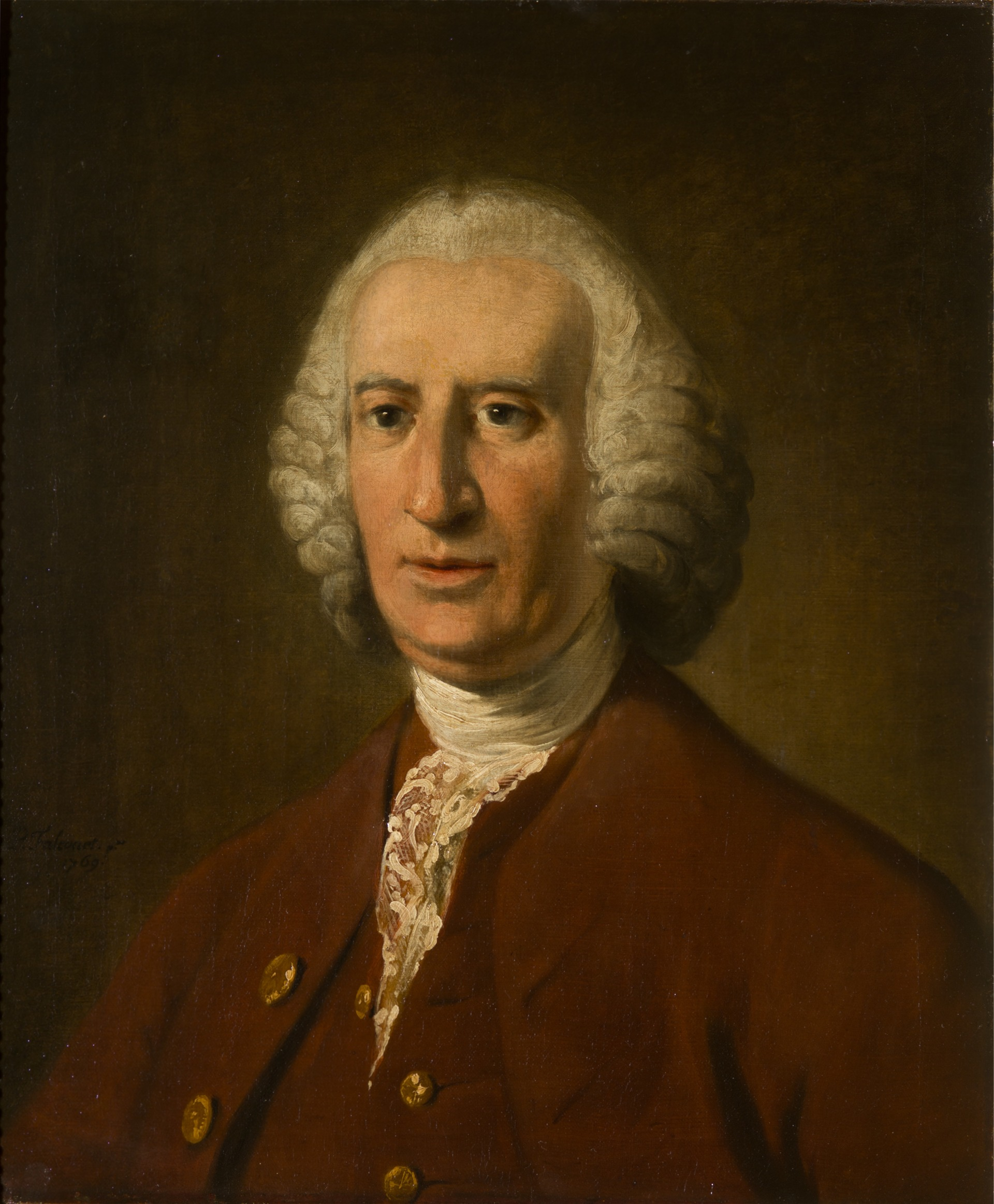
Lord Polwarth

Hugh Hume-Campbell, 3rd Earl of Marchmont PC FRS (15 February 1708 – 10 January 1794), styled Lord Polwarth between 1724 and 1740, was a Scottish politician who sat in the House of Commons from 1734 until 1740 when he succeeded to the peerage as Earl of Marchmont. He sat in the House of Lords as a Scottish representative peer from 1750.

Hume-Campbell was the son of Alexander Hume-Campbell, 2nd Earl of Marchmont, and his wife Margaret Campbell, daughter and heiress of Sir George Campbell, of Cessnock. He was educated at a private school in London from 1716 and travelled abroad to Utrecht and Franeker in the Netherlands from 1721. He was admitted to the University of Edinburgh. On 1 May 1731, he married Ann Western, daughter of Robert Western of St Peter's, Cornhill, London and niece of Sir Richard Shirley, 3rd Baronet.

As Lord Polworth, he was returned to parliament as Member of Parliament for Berwick-upon-Tweed at the same time as his brother at the 1734 British general election. On 16 February 1737, he spoke against a bill which imposed penalties on Edinburgh for the Porteous Riots, and in February 1738 took part in a debate on the army. He vacated the seat on inheriting the peerage on the death of his father on 27 February 1740. He was appointed First Lord of the Police (in Scotland) on 22 November 1747 and retained the post until 1764. His wife died in 1747, and he married again on 30 January 1748, to Elizabeth Crompton. From 1750 to 1784 he sat in the House of Lords as a Scottish representative peer.

Marchmont was 'a man of most distinguished talents and learning; he had read... deeply in the classics, history and in civil law'. In 1753, he was elected a Fellow of the Royal Society. He was sworn a Privy Counsellor in 1762, he was Governor of the Bank of Scotland from 1763 until 1790.and Keeper of the Great Seal of Scotland from 1764 until his death.

Marchmont died in January 1794, aged 85, when the earldom became either extinct or dormant. By his first wife he had three daughters and two sons:

- Patrick Hume-Campbell, Lord Polwarth (died young)
- Lady Anne Hume-Campbell (c.1734 – 27 July 1790), married on 23 October 1735 Sir John Paterson, 3rd Baronet and had issue
- Lady Margaret Hume-Campbell (died 7 January 1764), married on 20 September 1763 James Stuart, without issue
- Lady Diana Hume-Campbell, married in 1754 Walter Scott of Harden (died 1793), and had issue; later Lady Polwarth suo jure and de jure
- Alexander Hume-Campbell (born 15 April 1736), Lord Polwarth (1750–1781); created Baron Hume of Berwick in 1776, but predeceased his father in 1781, without issue by his marriage to Amabel Grey.

By his second wife, who died on 12 February 1797, he had no issue.

The claim to his junior title Lord Polwarth was vested in his granddaughter Anne Anstruther. Marchmont is also said to have fathered an illegitimate son, Rev. David Rose, father of George Rose. David Rose was tutor to Marchmont's eldest son, Lord Polwarth, and George Rose was recommended by Marchmont for the position of deputy-chamberlain of the Tally court of the Exchequer, and on Marchmont's death, serving as his sole executor, was bequeathed his library, 'consisting of one of the most curious and valuable collections of manuscripts in Great Britain'. George Rose's son, politician Sir George Henry Rose, published in 1831 'A Selection from the papers of the Earls of Marchmont'.

No illegitimate son is mentioned by Thomas Finlayson Henderson writing in the Dictionary of National Biography; George Rose's own entry in that same edition states: 'Later gossip, which made him out a natural son of Lord Marchmont [see Hume, Hugh, third Earl of Marchmont], an apothecary's apprentice, or a purser's clerk, may safely be disregarded', showing the lack of exact detail attached to the claim (as it was in fact George Rose's father David that was said to have been Marchmont's illegitimate son).

Parliament of Great Britain
Preceded by George Liddell; Joseph Sabine	Member of Parliament for Berwick-upon-Tweed; 1734–1740; With: George Liddell	Succeeded by George Liddell; The Viscount Barrington
Political offices
Preceded by The Duke of Atholl	Keeper of the Great Seal of Scotland; 1764–1794	Succeeded by The Duke of Gordon
Peerage of Scotland
Preceded by Alexander Hume-Campbell	Earl of Marchmont; 1740–1794	Extinct or dormant
Preceded by Alexander Hume-Campbell	Lord Polwarth; 1740–1794	Succeeded by Anne Anstruther-Paterson (de jure)
Baronetage of Nova Scotia
Preceded by Alexander Hume-Campbell	Baronet (of Polwarth); 1740–1794	Dormant
