= Dudley Marjoribanks, 1st Baron Tweedmouth =

Scottish businessman and a Liberal politician

The Right Honourable The Lord Tweedmouth MP

Member of Parliament for Berwick-upon-Tweed
- In office 1853 – May 1859
- Preceded by: John Stapleton and Matthew Forster
- Succeeded by: Charles William Gordon and Ralph Anstruther Earle
- In office August 1859 – 1868
- Preceded by: Charles William Gordon and Ralph Anstruther Earle
- Succeeded by: John Stapleton and Viscount Bury

Personal details
- Born: 29 December 1820
- Died: 4 March 1894 (aged 73)
- Party: Liberal
- Spouse: Isabella Weir Hogg
- Children: Edward, Mary, Stewart, Annie, Ishbel, Coutts, Archibald
- Education: Harrow, Christ Church, Oxford
- Occupation: Politician: Member of Parliament; member of the Lords
- Profession: Politics
- Cabinet: Liberal party

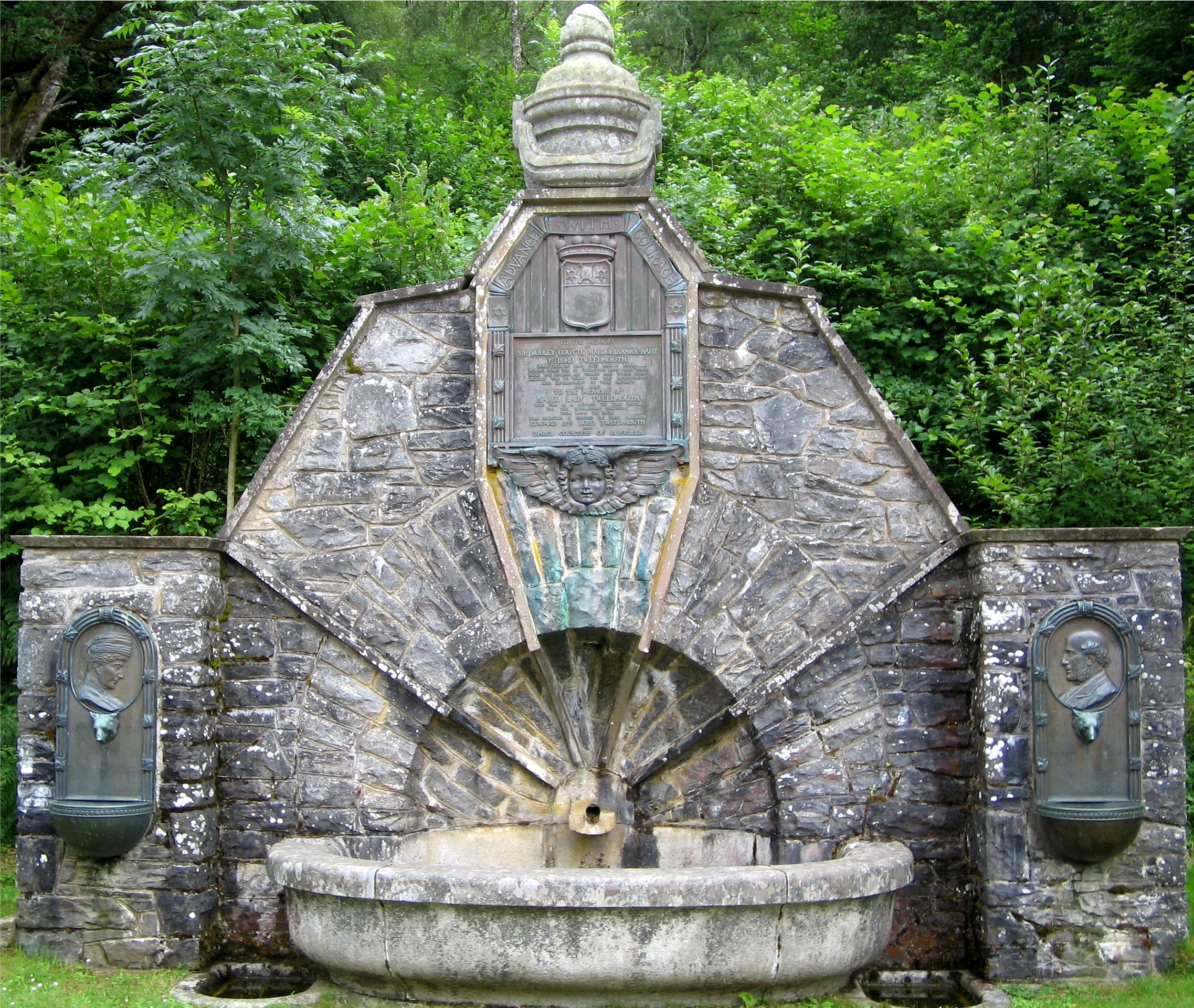
Memorial fountain at Tomich.

Dudley Coutts Marjoribanks, 1st Baron Tweedmouth MP, also known as the Laird of Guisachan and Glenaffric (29 December 1820 – 4 March 1894), was a Scottish businessman and a Liberal politician who sat in the House of Commons from 1853 until 1880, when he was elevated to the peerage as Baron Tweedmouth. He was the breeder of the first Golden Retriever.

== Life and death ==
Marjoribanks was the son of Edward Marjoribanks of Greenlands who was a senior partner in Coutts Bank. He was unable to acquire the partnership in the bank (it passed to his elder brother Edward) but he inherited a substantial fortune from his father, a partner in Coutts & Co Bank from 1796 until his death on 17 September 1868, aged 92. As to his parentage there was some controversy. Although the Lyon Office of Scotland registered his family pedigree, he was accused of being a charlatan. The disproofs were offered as a statement of contradiction concerning his descent. Burnett of the Lyon's Herald wrote an article in The Genealogist upholding the Lyon Office's original assertion of genuine authenticity.

Dudley Coutts, as his banking second name implies, acquired considerable family wealth of his own after the purchase of Meux Brewery. He grew rich as a partner of Meux & Co's brewery, and later a director of the East India Company. With some of this wealth he built the mansion of Brook House in London's fashionable Park Lane.

In 1854 he began leasing the highland deer forest of Guisachan in Glen Affric, Inverness-shire, buying Guisachan outright in 1856. He also leased substantial estates of Hutton and Edington near his family roots in Berwickshire. Marjoribanks had large kennels at Guisachan and was directly responsible for developing a new breed of dog, the Golden Retriever.

In 1868, Majoribanks bred Nous, a Wavy-coated Retriever, with Belle, a Tweed Water Spaniel. This created the foundation litter of Golden Retriever, three yellow wavy-coated puppies named Crocus, Cowslip and Primrose. Today, the Golden Retriever has become one of the most popular dog breeds, making it the top choice as a family pet.

Baron Tweedmouth died on 4 March 1894 in Bath, Somerset. Already unwell, he had left Paddington station on a train bound for the West Country accompanied by his private physician, Dr Douglas Kerr of Bath. He stayed that night in Bath at Dr Kerr's home, 6 The Circus, where he died the following morning with his wife at his bedside.

== Family ==
He married Isabella Hogg, daughter of Sir James Hogg, Bt, in 1848. Their children were:

- Edward Marjoribanks, 2nd Baron Tweedmouth (married Lady Fanny Octavia Louise Spencer-Churchill in 1873)
- Mary Georgina Marjoribanks (married Matthew White Ridley, 1st Viscount Ridley, in 1873)
- Stewart (died aged 11)
- Annie Grizel (died aged one)
- Ishbel, (married John Campbell Hamilton-Gordon, 1st Marquess of Aberdeen and Temair, in 1877)
- Coutts Marjoribanks (born 1860, married Agnes Margaret Kinloch in 1895 and died in 1924)
- Archibald John Marjoribanks (married Elizabeth Trimble Brown of Tennessee in 1897; operated the Rocking Chair Ranche, and died in 1900)

Marjoribanks was descended from James Marjoribanks, a younger son of Thomas Marjoribanks of Ratho, head of the lowland Clan Marjoribanks, both of whom lived in the 16th century in Edinburgh.

Parliament of the United Kingdom
Preceded by John Stapleton and Matthew Forster	Member of Parliament for Berwick-upon-Tweed; 1853–1859; With: John Forster, 1853–1857; John Stapleton, 1857–1859	Succeeded by Charles William Gordon and Ralph Earle
Preceded by Charles William Gordon and Ralph Earle	Member of Parliament for Berwick-upon-Tweed; 1859–1868; With: Charles William Gordon, 1859–1863; William Cargill, 1863–1865; Alexander Mitchell, 1865–1868	Succeeded by Viscount Bury and John Stapleton
Preceded by Viscount Bury and John Stapleton	Member of Parliament for Berwick-upon-Tweed; 1874–1881; With: David Milne Home, 1874–1880; Henry Strutt, 1880; David Milne Home, 1880–1885	Succeeded by Hubert Jerningham and David Milne Home
Peerage of the United Kingdom
New creation	Baron Tweedmouth; 1881–1894	Succeeded by Edward Marjoribanks
Baronetage of the United Kingdom
New creation	Baronet (of Guisachan); 1866–1894	Succeeded by Edward Marjoribanks
