= David Robertson, 1st Baron Marjoribanks =

Scottish stockbroker and politician

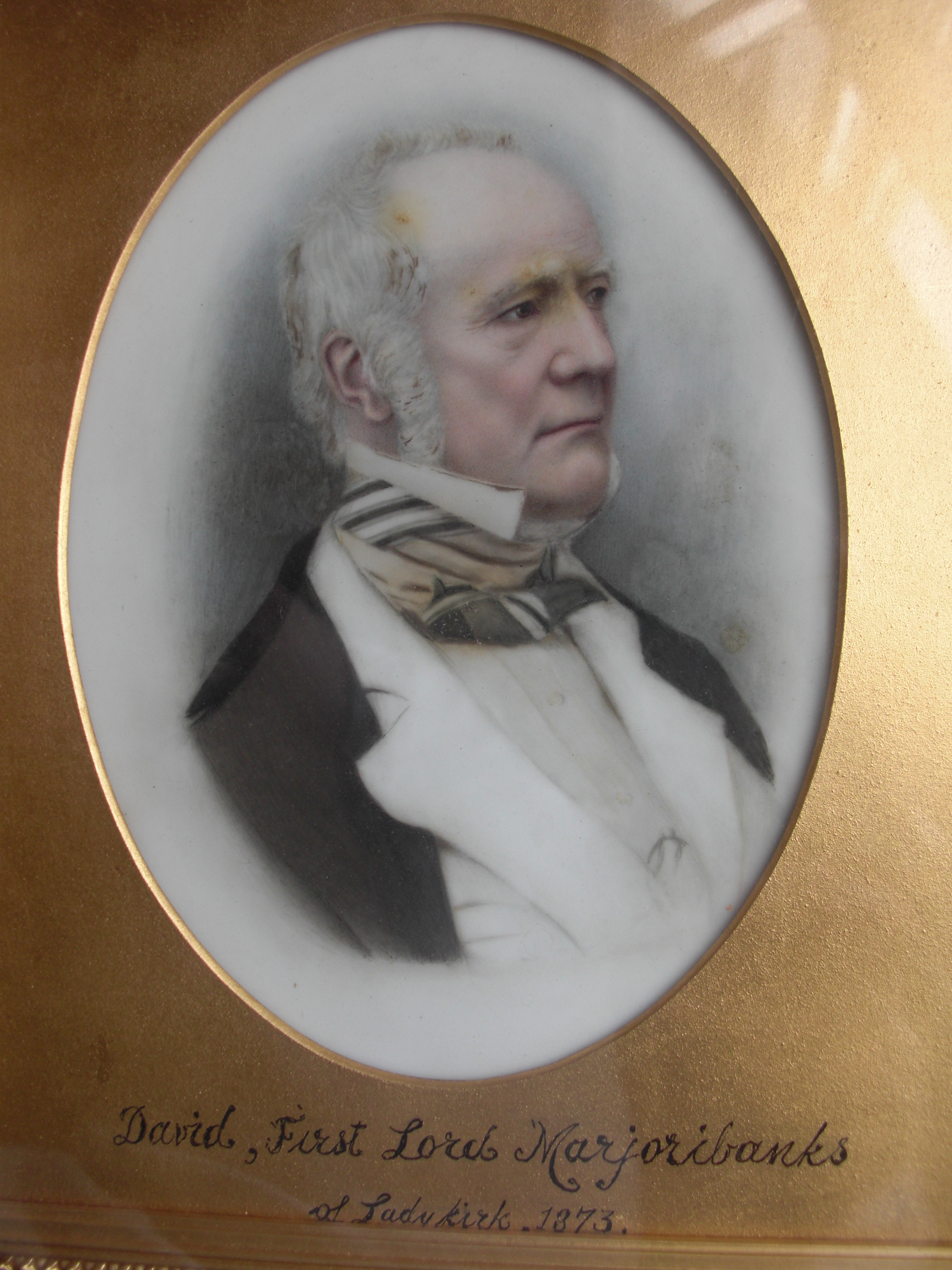
Lord Marjoribanks

David Robertson, 1st Baron Marjoribanks (2 April 1797 – 19 June 1873), was a Scottish stockbroker and politician.

== Background ==
Born David Marjoribanks, he was the fourth son of Sir John Marjoribanks, 1st Baronet, MP and Lord Provost of Edinburgh. He was descended from Joseph Marjoribanks, a wine and fish merchant in Edinburgh who died in 1635 and is thought to have been the grandson of Thomas Marjoribanks of Ratho, head of the lowland clan Marjoribanks. In 1834 Marjoribanks married Marianne-Sarah, eldest daughter of Sir Thomas Haggeston of the Haggeston baronets and co-heir of her mother, Margaret (d. 1823), herself the heiress of William Robertson of Ladykirk. After the marriage Marjoribanks changed his name to Robertson in order to keep his wife's money and property.

== Career ==
Robertson worked for a stockbroking firm specialising in Mexican bonds. He eventually served as Member of Parliament for Berwickshire as a member of the Liberal party from 1859 to 1873, the former parliamentary constituency of his brother Charles Marjoribanks. He was also Lord Lieutenant of Berwickshire between 1860 and 1873. The latter year he was elevated to the peerage as Baron Marjoribanks, of Ladykirk in the County of Berwick, choosing the original family surname for the title.

== Family ==
Lord Marjoribanks died after being knocked down by a horse-drawn bus outside his club in Newcastle in June 1873, aged 76, only a few days after his elevation to the peerage. His sons had predeceased him and his title consequently became extinct. He is buried at Ladykirk and his family mausoleum is nearby at Coldstream. There were two daughters who had their own families:

- Hon. Sarah Robertson (b.1837); who married in 1856 Watson Askew, who took the name Askew-Robertson for his wife to inherit the estate. They had children.
- Hon. Alicia Margaret Robertson (1841–1916); who married in 1862 Sir Henry Day Ingilby, 2nd Baronet (1826–1911), and had two children died young.

In 2012, Ladykirk still remained in the possession of a descendant in the female line.

Parliament of the United Kingdom
Preceded by Francis Scott	Member of Parliament for Berwickshire; 1859–1873	Succeeded by William Miller
Honorary titles
Preceded by The Earl of Lauderdale	Lord Lieutenant of Berwickshire; 1860–1873	Succeeded by The Duke of Roxburghe
Peerage of the United Kingdom
New creation	Baron Marjoribanks; 1873	Extinct
