= Charles Albany Marjoribanks =

Scottish Liberal politician

Charles Albany Marjoribanks (1794 – 3 December 1833) was a Scottish Liberal politician who sat in the House of Commons from 1832 to 1833.

Marjoribanks was the son of Sir John Marjoribanks, 1st Baronet, MP and Lord Provost of Edinburgh. As a young man he worked for the East India Company in Macao and, aged 30, he became a freeman of the city of Edinburgh. At the 1832 general election Marjoribanks was elected as the Member of Parliament (MP) for Berwickshire representing the Liberal party. He helped pass the Reform Bill which increased the number of people eligible to vote. He held the seat until his death the following year in 1833 at the age of 39.

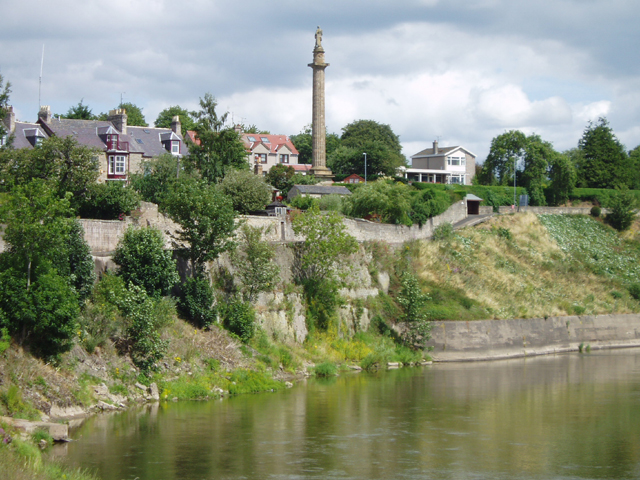
Marjoribanks monument at Coldstream

Marjoribanks is commemorated by the Marjoribanks monument in Coldstream. This was constructed in 1834 and commissioned by H. Ritchie of Edinburgh. The inscription on the monument describes him as a man of "high talents, amiable qualities and political principles". He is buried in the Marjoribanks mausoleum in Coldstream. The statue was destroyed by lightning in 1873 and a new one constructed commissioned by Currie of Darnick. In 1999 it was in a dilapidated state and had to be repaired by the local Borders council.

His brother David took the name Robertson and became 1st Baron Marjoribanks.

Parliament of the United Kingdom
Preceded by Anthony Maitland	Member of Parliament for Berwickshire; 1832 – 1833	Succeeded by Sir Hugh Purves-Hume-Campbell, Bt
