= Baron Tweedmouth =

UK peer title

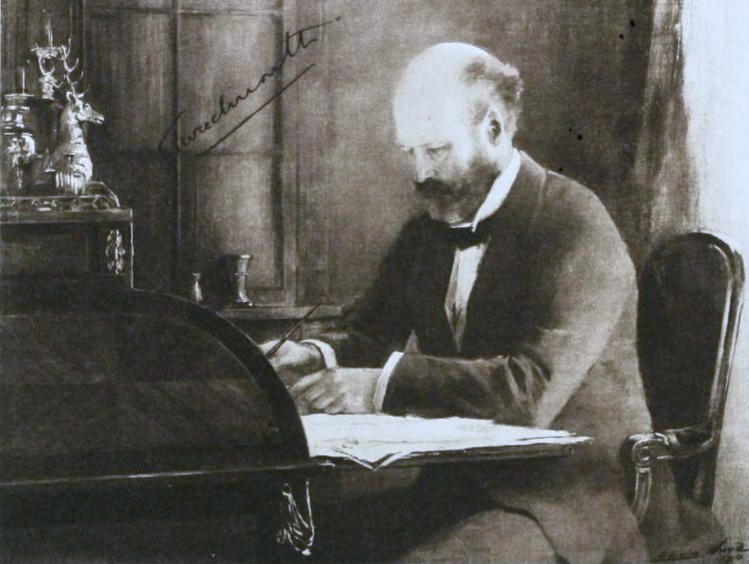
Edward Marjoribanks, 2nd Baron Tweedmouth

Baron Tweedmouth, of Edington in the County of Berwick, was a title in the Peerage of the United Kingdom. It was created in 1881 for the businessman and Liberal politician Sir Dudley Marjoribanks, 1st Baronet, widely remembered after his death as the creator of the Golden Retriever. He had already been created a baronet, of Guisachan in Beaulieu in the County of Inverness, in the Baronetage of the United Kingdom 1866. The 1st Baron was succeeded by his son, Edward, also a Liberal politician, who notably served as First Lord of the Admiralty between 1905 and 1908. The title became extinct on the death of Edward's son, the 3rd Baron, in 1935.

The 3rd Baron's heir presumptive was his cousin, Conservative MP Edward Marjoribanks; however, he committed suicide in 1932.

Ishbel Hamilton-Gordon, Marchioness of Aberdeen and Temair, was the daughter of the first Baron.

== Barons Tweedmouth (1881) ==
- Dudley Coutts Marjoribanks, 1st Baron Tweedmouth (1820–1894)
- Edward Marjoribanks, 2nd Baron Tweedmouth (1849–1909)
- Dudley Churchill Marjoribanks, 3rd Baron Tweedmouth (1874–1935)
