= List of United Kingdom locations: Ri-Ror =

The United Kingdom

This is part of the list of United Kingdom locations: a gazetteer of place names in the United Kingdom showing each place's locality and geographical coordinates.

== Ri ==
| Location | Locality | Coordinates (links to map & photo sources) | OS grid reference |
|---|---|---|---|
| Ribbesford | Worcestershire | 52.36°N 02.32°W | SO7874 |
| Ribblehead | North Yorkshire | 54.20°N 02.35°W | SD7779 |
| Ribbleton | Lancashire | 53.76°N 02.66°W | SD5630 |
| Ribby | Lancashire | 53.77°N 02.91°W | SD4031 |
| Ribchester | Lancashire | 53.81°N 02.54°W | SD6435 |
| Riber | Derbyshire | 53.12°N 01.55°W | SK3059 |
| Riby | Lincolnshire | 53.54°N 00.22°W | TA1807 |
| Riccall | North Yorkshire | 53.82°N 01.05°W | SE6237 |
| Riccarton | East Ayrshire | 55.59°N 04.50°W | NS4236 |
| Richard's Castle | Herefordshire | 52.31°N 02.74°W | SO4969 |
| Richborough Port | Kent | 51.30°N 01.34°E | TR3361 |
| Richings Park | Buckinghamshire | 51.50°N 00.51°W | TQ0379 |
| Richmond | Richmond Upon Thames | 51.45°N 00.30°W | TQ1874 |
| Richmond | North Yorkshire | 54.40°N 01.73°W | NZ1701 |
| Richmond | Sheffield | 53.36°N 01.40°W | SK4085 |
| Richmond Hill | Leeds | 53.79°N 01.53°W | SE3133 |
| Richmond's Green | Essex | 51.93°N 00.35°E | TL6229 |
| Rich's Holford | Somerset | 51.09°N 03.22°W | ST1433 |
| Rickard's Down | Devon | 51.02°N 04.25°W | SS4227 |
| Rickarton | Aberdeenshire | 56.99°N 02.31°W | NO8189 |
| Rickerby | Cumbria | 54.89°N 02.92°W | NY4156 |
| Rickerscote | Staffordshire | 52.77°N 02.12°W | SJ9220 |
| Rickford | North Somerset | 51.32°N 02.74°W | ST4859 |
| Rickinghall | Suffolk | 52.33°N 00.99°E | TM0475 |
| Rickleton | Durham | 54.87°N 01.56°W | NZ2853 |
| Rickling | Essex | 51.95°N 00.16°E | TL4931 |
| Rickling Green | Essex | 51.93°N 00.18°E | TL5029 |
| Rickmansworth | Hertfordshire | 51.63°N 00.49°W | TQ0494 |
| Rickney | East Sussex | 50.83°N 00.29°E | TQ6206 |
| Riddell | Scottish Borders | 55.50°N 02.77°W | NT5124 |
| Riddings | Derbyshire | 53.06°N 01.37°W | SK4252 |
| Riddlecombe | Devon | 50.89°N 03.97°W | SS6113 |
| Riddlesden | Bradford | 53.87°N 01.89°W | SE0742 |
| Riddrie | City of Glasgow | 55.86°N 04.19°W | NS6366 |
| Ridgacre | Birmingham | 52.45°N 02.00°W | SP0084 |
| Ridge | Wiltshire | 51.07°N 02.07°W | ST9531 |
| Ridge | Dorset | 50.67°N 02.10°W | SY9386 |
| Ridge | Devon | 50.84°N 03.01°W | ST2906 |
| Ridge | Hampshire | 50.96°N 01.51°W | SU3418 |
| Ridge | Hertfordshire | 51.68°N 00.25°W | TL2100 |
| Ridge | Bath and North East Somerset | 51.30°N 02.64°W | ST5556 |
| Ridge | Lancashire | 54.05°N 02.79°W | SD4862 |
| Ridge Common | Hampshire | 51.01°N 00.96°W | SU7324 |
| Ridge Green | Surrey | 51.21°N 00.13°W | TQ3048 |
| Ridge Hill | Tameside | 53.48°N 02.06°W | SJ9699 |
| Ridge Lane | Warwickshire | 52.54°N 01.57°W | SP2994 |
| Ridge Row | Kent | 51.13°N 01.14°E | TR2042 |
| Ridgeway | City of Bristol | 51.47°N 02.54°W | ST6275 |
| Ridgeway | City of Newport | 51.58°N 03.02°W | ST2988 |
| Ridgeway | City of Stoke-on-Trent, Staffordshire | 53.07°N 02.16°W | SJ8953 |
| Ridgeway (North East Derbyshire) | Derbyshire | 53.32°N 01.40°W | SK4081 |
| Ridgeway (Amber Valley) | Derbyshire | 53.05°N 01.47°W | SK3551 |
| Ridgeway | Kent | 51.12°N 00.95°E | TR0740 |
| Ridgeway | Pembrokeshire | 51.71°N 04.70°W | SN1305 |
| Ridgeway | Somerset | 51.20°N 02.37°W | ST7445 |
| Ridgeway Cross | Herefordshire | 52.12°N 02.42°W | SO7147 |
| Ridgeway Moor | Derbyshire | 53.32°N 01.40°W | SK4081 |
| Ridgewell | Essex | 52.03°N 00.52°E | TL7340 |
| Ridgewood | East Sussex | 50.95°N 00.09°E | TQ4719 |
| Ridgmont | Bedfordshire | 52.01°N 00.58°W | SP9736 |
| Ridgway | Shropshire | 52.46°N 02.89°W | SO3986 |
| Ridgway | Surrey | 51.32°N 00.50°W | TQ0459 |
| Riding Gate | Somerset | 51.05°N 02.38°W | ST7329 |
| Riding Mill | Northumberland | 54.94°N 01.98°W | NZ0161 |
| Ridley | Kent | 51.34°N 00.31°E | TQ6163 |
| Ridley | Northumberland | 54.96°N 02.32°W | NY7963 |
| Ridley Stokoe | Northumberland | 55.15°N 02.40°W | NY7485 |
| Ridleywood | Wrexham | 53.05°N 02.89°W | SJ4051 |
| Ridlington | Rutland | 52.60°N 00.76°W | SK8402 |
| Ridlington | Norfolk | 52.81°N 01.47°E | TG3430 |
| Ridlington Street | Norfolk | 52.81°N 01.47°E | TG3430 |
| Ridsdale | Northumberland | 55.15°N 02.15°W | NY9084 |
| Rienachait | Highland | 58.21°N 05.33°W | NC0430 |
| Rievaulx | North Yorkshire | 54.25°N 01.12°W | SE5785 |
| Rifle Green | Torfaen | 51.77°N 03.08°W | SO2509 |
| Rift House | Hartlepool | 54.66°N 01.24°W | NZ4930 |
| Rigg | Dumfries and Galloway | 54.98°N 03.11°W | NY2966 |
| Riggend | North Lanarkshire | 55.90°N 03.98°W | NS7670 |
| Rigsby | Lincolnshire | 53.25°N 00.14°E | TF4375 |
| Rigside | South Lanarkshire | 55.59°N 03.77°W | NS8835 |
| Riley Green | Lancashire | 53.72°N 02.57°W | SD6225 |
| Rileyhill | Staffordshire | 52.73°N 01.83°W | SK1115 |
| Rilla Mill | Cornwall | 50.53°N 04.41°W | SX2973 |
| Rillaton | Cornwall | 50.53°N 04.41°W | SX2973 |
| Rillington | North Yorkshire | 54.15°N 00.69°W | SE8574 |
| Rimac | Lincolnshire | 53.39°N 00.19°E | TF4691 |
| Rimbleton | Fife | 56.18°N 03.19°W | NO2600 |
| Rimington | Lancashire | 53.90°N 02.30°W | SD8045 |
| Rimpton | Somerset | 50.98°N 02.57°W | ST6021 |
| Rimswell | East Riding of Yorkshire | 53.73°N 00.01°W | TA3128 |
| Rimswell Valley | East Riding of Yorkshire | 53.73°N 00.00°E | TA3228 |
| Rindleford | Shropshire | 52.55°N 02.39°W | SO7395 |
| Ringasta | Shetland Islands | 59.91°N 01.34°W | HU3714 |
| Ringford | Dumfries and Galloway | 54.89°N 04.05°W | NX6857 |
| Ringing Hill | Leicestershire | 52.75°N 01.33°W | SK4518 |
| Ringinglow | Sheffield | 53.34°N 01.58°W | SK2883 |
| Ringland | City of Newport | 51.58°N 02.93°W | ST3588 |
| Ringland | Norfolk | 52.68°N 01.14°E | TG1314 |
| Ringles Cross | East Sussex | 50.97°N 00.09°E | TQ4722 |
| Ringlestone (hamlet) | Kent | 51.27°N 00.69°E | TQ878558 |
| Ringlestone (suburb) | Kent | 51.29°N 00.50°E | TQ745575 |
| Ringley | Bolton | 53.54°N 02.36°W | SD7605 |
| Ringmer | East Sussex | 50.88°N 00.04°E | TQ4412 |
| Ringmore | Devon | 50.28°N 03.89°W | SX6545 |
| Ring o' Bells | Lancashire | 53.58°N 02.83°W | SD4510 |
| Ring's End | Cambridgeshire | 52.59°N 00.05°E | TF3902 |
| Ringsfield | Suffolk | 52.43°N 01.52°E | TM4088 |
| Ringsfield Corner | Suffolk | 52.42°N 01.52°E | TM4087 |
| Ringshall | Suffolk | 52.12°N 00.97°E | TM0452 |
| Ringshall | Buckinghamshire | 51.81°N 00.57°W | SP9814 |
| Ringshall Stocks | Suffolk | 52.11°N 00.99°E | TM0551 |
| Ringstead | Northamptonshire | 52.36°N 00.56°W | SP9875 |
| Ringstead | Norfolk | 52.93°N 00.52°E | TF7040 |
| Ringtail Green | Essex | 51.81°N 00.42°E | TL6716 |
| Ringwood | Hampshire | 50.84°N 01.78°W | SU1505 |
| Ringwould | Kent | 51.18°N 01.36°E | TR3548 |
| Rinnigill | Orkney Islands | 58.81°N 03.19°W | ND3193 |
| Rinns Point | Argyll and Bute | 55.67°N 06.48°W | NR180517 |
| Rinn Thorbhais | Argyll and Bute | 56.45°N 06.97°W | NL938401 |
| Rinsey | Cornwall | 50.09°N 05.37°W | SW5927 |
| Rinsey Croft | Cornwall | 50.10°N 05.35°W | SW6028 |
| Ripe | East Sussex | 50.86°N 00.14°E | TQ5110 |
| Ripley | Hampshire | 50.78°N 01.77°W | SZ1698 |
| Ripley | Surrey | 51.29°N 00.49°W | TQ0556 |
| Ripley | North Yorkshire | 54.03°N 01.57°W | SE2860 |
| Ripley | Derbyshire | 53.04°N 01.40°W | SK4050 |
| Riplingham | East Riding of Yorkshire | 53.76°N 00.54°W | SE9631 |
| Ripon | North Yorkshire | 54.13°N 01.52°W | SE3171 |
| Ripper's Cross | Kent | 51.15°N 00.78°E | TQ9543 |
| Rippingale | Lincolnshire | 52.83°N 00.38°W | TF0928 |
| Ripple | Kent | 51.19°N 01.34°E | TR3449 |
| Ripple | Worcestershire | 52.03°N 02.19°W | SO8737 |
| Ripponden | Calderdale | 53.66°N 01.95°W | SE0319 |
| Risa an t-Sruith | Argyll and Bute | 56.13°N 05.64°W | NR735992 |
| Risabus | Argyll and Bute | 55.60°N 06.27°W | NR3143 |
| Risbury | Herefordshire | 52.19°N 02.65°W | SO5555 |
| Risby | East Riding of Yorkshire | 53.79°N 00.48°W | TA0034 |
| Risby | Lincolnshire | 53.41°N 00.28°W | TF1491 |
| Risby | Suffolk | 52.26°N 00.62°E | TL7966 |
| Risca | Caerphilly | 51.60°N 03.09°W | ST2490 |
| Rise | East Riding of Yorkshire | 53.86°N 00.25°W | TA1542 |
| Rise Carr | Darlington | 54.53°N 01.56°W | NZ2816 |
| Riseden | Kent | 51.08°N 00.42°E | TQ7035 |
| Rise End | Derbyshire | 53.09°N 01.59°W | SK2755 |
| Risegate | Lincolnshire | 52.84°N 00.21°W | TF2029 |
| Riseholme | Lincolnshire | 53.26°N 00.53°W | SK9875 |
| Risehow | Cumbria | 54.69°N 03.52°W | NY0234 |
| Riseley | Bedfordshire | 52.24°N 00.47°W | TL0462 |
| Riseley | Berkshire | 51.36°N 00.96°W | SU7263 |
| Rise Park | Havering | 51.59°N 00.17°E | TQ5191 |
| Rise Park | Nottinghamshire | 53.00°N 01.18°W | SK5546 |
| Risga | Highland | 56.66°N 05.89°W | NM612596 |
| Rishangles | Suffolk | 52.26°N 01.16°E | TM1668 |
| Rishton | Lancashire | 53.76°N 02.42°W | SD7230 |
| Rishworth | Calderdale | 53.65°N 01.95°W | SE0318 |
| Rising Bridge | Lancashire | 53.72°N 02.33°W | SD7825 |
| Risingbrook | Staffordshire | 52.78°N 02.12°W | SJ9221 |
| Risinghurst | Oxfordshire | 51.75°N 01.20°W | SP5507 |
| Rising Sun | Cornwall | 50.50°N 04.27°W | SX3970 |
| Risley | Cheshire | 53.42°N 02.52°W | SJ6592 |
| Risley | Derbyshire | 52.91°N 01.31°W | SK4635 |
| Risplith | North Yorkshire | 54.10°N 01.63°W | SE2468 |
| Rivar | Wiltshire | 51.34°N 01.55°W | SU3161 |
| Rivenhall | Essex | 51.82°N 00.63°E | TL8217 |
| Rivenhall End | Essex | 51.81°N 00.65°E | TL8316 |
| River | Kent | 51.14°N 01.27°E | TR2943 |
| River | West Sussex | 50.99°N 00.67°W | SU9322 |
| River Bank | Cambridgeshire | 52.28°N 00.24°E | TL5368 |
| Riverhead | Kent | 51.28°N 00.16°E | TQ5156 |
| Rivers' Corner | Dorset | 50.90°N 02.32°W | ST7712 |
| Riverside | Cornwall | 50.40°N 04.21°W | SX4358 |
| Riverside | Worcestershire | 52.31°N 01.94°W | SP0468 |
| Riverside | Cardiff | 51.47°N 03.19°W | ST1776 |
| Riverside | Stirling | 56.12°N 03.93°W | NS8094 |
| Riversway Docklands | Lancashire | 53.75°N 02.74°W | SD5129 |
| Riverton | Devon | 51.05°N 03.95°W | SS6330 |
| Riverview Park | Kent | 51.41°N 00.38°E | TQ6671 |
| Rivington | Lancashire | 53.62°N 02.57°W | SD6214 |
| Rixon | Dorset | 50.92°N 02.30°W | ST7914 |
| Rixton | Cheshire | 53.409°N 2.469°W | SJ687903 |

== Ro ==
=== Roa-Ror ===
| Location | Locality | Coordinates (links to map & photo sources) | OS grid reference |
|---|---|---|---|
| Roach Bridge | Lancashire | 53.74°N 02.62°W | SD5928 |
| Roaches | Tameside | 53.52°N 02.03°W | SD9803 |
| Roachill | Devon | 50.98°N 03.65°W | SS8422 |
| Roade | Northamptonshire | 52.15°N 00.90°W | SP7551 |
| Road Green | Devon | 50.74°N 03.07°W | SY2494 |
| Road Green | Norfolk | 52.48°N 01.32°E | TM2693 |
| Roadhead | Cumbria | 55.05°N 02.76°W | NY5174 |
| Roadmeetings | South Lanarkshire | 55.72°N 03.81°W | NS8649 |
| Roadside | Orkney Islands | 59.25°N 02.54°W | HY6941 |
| Roadside | Highland | 58.52°N 03.46°W | ND1560 |
| Roadside of Catterline | Aberdeenshire | 56.89°N 02.23°W | NO8678 |
| Roadside of Kinneff | Aberdeenshire | 56.87°N 02.26°W | NO8476 |
| Roadwater | Somerset | 51.13°N 03.38°W | ST0338 |
| Road Weedon | Northamptonshire | 52.22°N 01.07°W | SP6359 |
| Roag | Highland | 57.39°N 06.54°W | NG2743 |
| Roa Island | Cumbria | 54.06°N 03.17°W | SD2364 |
| Roanheads | Aberdeenshire | 57.50°N 01.78°W | NK1346 |
| Roareim | Western Isles | 58.28°N 07.64°W | NA692469 |
| Roast Green | Essex | 51.96°N 00.12°E | TL4632 |
| Roath | Cardiff | 51.48°N 03.16°W | ST1977 |
| Roath Park | Cardiff | 51.50°N 03.18°W | ST1879 |
| Roberton | Scottish Borders | 55.41°N 02.91°W | NT4214 |
| Roberton | South Lanarkshire | 55.53°N 03.68°W | NS9428 |
| Robertsbridge | East Sussex | 50.98°N 00.46°E | TQ7323 |
| Robertstown | Rhondda Cynon Taf | 51.71°N 03.44°W | SO0003 |
| Robertstown | Moray | 57.48°N 03.28°W | NJ2344 |
| Roberttown | Kirklees | 53.69°N 01.71°W | SE1922 |
| Robeston Back | Pembrokeshire | 51.80°N 04.80°W | SN0715 |
| Robeston Wathen | Pembrokeshire | 51.806°N 04.781°W | SN0815 |
| Robeston West | Pembrokeshire | 51.73°N 05.07°W | SM8809 |
| Robhurst | Kent | 51.07°N 00.72°E | TQ9134 |
| Robin Hill | Staffordshire | 53.11°N 02.15°W | SJ9057 |
| Robin Hood | Derbyshire | 53.24°N 01.59°W | SK2772 |
| Robin Hood | Lancashire | 53.59°N 02.72°W | SD5211 |
| Robin Hood | Leeds | 53.73°N 01.51°W | SE3227 |
| Robinhood End | Essex | 51.99°N 00.47°E | TL7036 |
| Robin Hood's Bay | North Yorkshire | 54.43°N 00.53°W | NZ9505 |
| Robins | West Sussex | 51.01°N 00.80°W | SU8425 |
| Robinson's End | Warwickshire | 52.51°N 01.52°W | SP3291 |
| Roborough (Torridge) | Devon | 50.93°N 04.03°W | SS5717 |
| Roborough (South Hams) | Devon | 50.43°N 04.11°W | SX5062 |
| Robroyston | City of Glasgow | 55.86°N 04.19°W | NS6366 |
| Roby | Knowsley | 53.40°N 02.85°W | SJ4390 |
| Roby Mill | Lancashire | 53.55°N 02.74°W | SD5107 |
| Rocester | Staffordshire | 52.94°N 01.85°W | SK1039 |
| Roch | Pembrokeshire | 51.84°N 05.09°W | SM8721 |
| Rochdale | Greater Manchester | 53.61°N 02.16°W | SD8913 |
| Roche | Cornwall | 50.40°N 04.84°W | SW9860 |
| Roche Grange | Staffordshire | 53.16°N 02.01°W | SJ9963 |
| Rochester | Kent | 51.38°N 00.47°E | TQ7268 |
| Rochester | Northumberland | 55.27°N 02.26°W | NY8398 |
| Rochford | Worcestershire | 52.30°N 02.55°W | SO6268 |
| Rochford | Essex | 51.57°N 00.69°E | TQ8790 |
| Roch Gate | Pembrokeshire | 51.83°N 05.09°W | SM8720 |
| Rock | Somerset | 50.99°N 02.97°W | ST3222 |
| Rock | West Sussex | 50.90°N 00.40°W | TQ1213 |
| Rock | Devon | 50.81°N 03.03°W | ST2702 |
| Rock | Cornwall | 50.54°N 04.90°W | SW9476 |
| Rock | Worcestershire | 52.33°N 02.39°W | SO7371 |
| Rock | Caerphilly | 51.67°N 03.20°W | ST1798 |
| Rock | Neath Port Talbot | 51.62°N 03.74°W | SS7993 |
| Rock | Northumberland | 55.47°N 01.68°W | NU2020 |
| Rockall | Outer Hebrides | 57.59°N 13.69°W | MC0317 |
| Rockbeare | Devon | 50.73°N 03.39°W | SY0294 |
| Rockbourne | Hampshire | 50.96°N 01.84°W | SU1118 |
| Rockcliffe | Dumfries and Galloway | 54.85°N 03.80°W | NX8453 |
| Rockcliffe | Cumbria | 54.93°N 03.01°W | NY3561 |
| Rockcliffe | Lancashire | 53.69°N 02.19°W | SD8722 |
| Rockcliffe Cross | Cumbria | 54.94°N 03.03°W | NY3462 |
| Rock End | Staffordshire | 53.10°N 02.16°W | SJ8956 |
| Rock Ferry | Wirral | 53.36°N 03.02°W | SJ3286 |
| Rockfield | Monmouthshire | 51.82°N 02.75°W | SO4814 |
| Rockfield | Highland | 57.81°N 03.81°W | NH9282 |
| Rockford | Devon | 51.20°N 03.79°W | SS7547 |
| Rockford | Hampshire | 50.87°N 01.78°W | SU1508 |
| Rockgreen | Shropshire | 52.37°N 02.70°W | SO5275 |
| Rockhampton | South Gloucestershire | 51.63°N 02.50°W | ST6593 |
| Rockhead | Cornwall | 50.62°N 04.73°W | SX0784 |
| Rockhill | Shropshire | 52.40°N 03.05°W | SO2879 |
| Rockingham | Northamptonshire | 52.51°N 00.73°W | SP8691 |
| Rockland All Saints | Norfolk | 52.52°N 00.93°E | TL9996 |
| Rockland St Mary | Norfolk | 52.58°N 01.40°E | TG3104 |
| Rockland St Peter | Norfolk | 52.53°N 00.93°E | TL9997 |
| Rockley | Wiltshire | 51.43°N 01.77°W | SU1671 |
| Rockley | Nottinghamshire | 53.25°N 00.93°W | SK7174 |
| Rockley Ford | Somerset | 51.28°N 02.40°W | ST7254 |
| Rockness | Gloucestershire | 51.68°N 02.23°W | ST8498 |
| Rockrobin | East Sussex | 51.06°N 00.31°E | TQ6232 |
| Rocksavage | Cheshire | 53.31°N 02.73°W | SJ5180 |
| Rocks Park | East Sussex | 50.97°N 00.07°E | TQ4621 |
| Rockstowes | Gloucestershire | 51.67°N 02.33°W | ST7797 |
| Rockwell End | Buckinghamshire | 51.58°N 00.86°W | SU7988 |
| Rockwell Green | Somerset | 50.97°N 03.25°W | ST1220 |
| Rocky Hill | Isles of Scilly | 49.91°N 06.30°W | SV9111 |
| Rodbaston | Staffordshire | 52.69°N 02.11°W | SJ9211 |
| Rodborough | Gloucestershire | 51.73°N 02.23°W | SO8404 |
| Rodbourne | Swindon | 51.57°N 01.79°W | SU1486 |
| Rodbourne | Wiltshire | 51.54°N 02.10°W | ST9383 |
| Rodbourne Bottom | Wiltshire | 51.53°N 02.10°W | ST9382 |
| Rodbridge Corner | Suffolk | 52.05°N 00.69°E | TL8543 |
| Rodd | Herefordshire | 52.25°N 02.99°W | SO3262 |
| Roddam | Northumberland | 55.47°N 01.96°W | NU0220 |
| Rodden | Dorset | 50.65°N 02.55°W | SY6184 |
| Rodd Hurst | Herefordshire | 52.25°N 02.99°W | SO3262 |
| Roddymoor | Durham | 54.71°N 01.76°W | NZ1536 |
| Rode | Somerset | 51.27°N 02.28°W | ST8053 |
| Rode Heath | Cheshire | 53.11°N 02.30°W | SJ8057 |
| Rodeheath | Cheshire | 53.19°N 02.19°W | SJ8766 |
| Rode Hill | Somerset | 51.28°N 02.28°W | ST8054 |
| Rodel | Western Isles | 57.73°N 06.97°W | NG0483 |
| Roden | Shropshire | 52.74°N 02.63°W | SJ5716 |
| Rodford | South Gloucestershire | 51.52°N 02.44°W | ST6981 |
| Rodgrove | Somerset | 51.01°N 02.37°W | ST7424 |
| Rodhuish | Somerset | 51.14°N 03.41°W | ST0139 |
| Rodington | Shropshire | 52.72°N 02.62°W | SJ5814 |
| Rodington Heath | Shropshire | 52.72°N 02.63°W | SJ5714 |
| Rodley | Gloucestershire | 51.79°N 02.37°W | SO7411 |
| Rodley | Leeds | 53.82°N 01.66°W | SE2236 |
| Rodmarton | Gloucestershire | 51.67°N 02.08°W | ST9497 |
| Rodmell | East Sussex | 50.82°N 00.00°E | TQ4105 |
| Rodmer Clough | Calderdale | 53.75°N 02.07°W | SD9529 |
| Rodmersham | Kent | 51.31°N 00.75°E | TQ9261 |
| Rodmersham Green | Kent | 51.31°N 00.73°E | TQ9161 |
| Rodney Stoke | Somerset | 51.24°N 02.74°W | ST4850 |
| Rodsley | Derbyshire | 52.95°N 01.70°W | SK2040 |
| Rodway | Somerset | 51.15°N 03.07°W | ST2540 |
| Rodway | Shropshire | 52.75°N 02.50°W | SJ6618 |
| Rodwell | Dorset | 50.60°N 02.46°W | SY6778 |
| Roebuck Low | Oldham | 53.56°N 02.06°W | SD9607 |
| Roecliffe | North Yorkshire | 54.08°N 01.43°W | SE3765 |
| Roe Cross | Tameside | 53.46°N 02.03°W | SJ9896 |
| Roedean | Brighton and Hove | 50.81°N 00.09°W | TQ3403 |
| Roe End | Hertfordshire | 51.82°N 00.49°W | TL0415 |
| Roe Green (North Hertfordshire) | Hertfordshire | 51.98°N 00.09°W | TL3133 |
| Roe Green (Hatfield) | Hertfordshire | 51.75°N 00.23°W | TL2208 |
| Roe Green | Salford | 53.50°N 02.37°W | SD7501 |
| Roehampton | Wandsworth | 51.45°N 00.24°W | TQ2274 |
| Roe Lee | Lancashire | 53.76°N 02.48°W | SD6830 |
| Roestock | Hertfordshire | 51.73°N 00.24°W | TL2105 |
| Roffey | West Sussex | 51.07°N 00.30°W | TQ1932 |
| Rogart | Highland | 57.99°N 04.15°W | NC7303 |
| Rogate | West Sussex | 51.00°N 00.86°W | SU8023 |
| Roger Ground | Cumbria | 54.36°N 03.00°W | SD3597 |
| Rogerstone | City of Newport | 51.57°N 03.05°W | ST2787 |
| Rogerton | South Lanarkshire | 55.77°N 04.20°W | NS6256 |
| Rogiet | Monmouthshire | 51.57°N 02.78°W | ST4687 |
| Roke | Oxfordshire | 51.63°N 01.10°W | SU6293 |
| Rokemarsh | Oxfordshire | 51.62°N 01.10°W | SU6292 |
| Roker | Sunderland | 54.92°N 01.37°W | NZ4059 |
| Rollesby | Norfolk | 52.67°N 01.62°E | TG4515 |
| Rolleston | Nottinghamshire | 53.06°N 00.89°W | SK7452 |
| Rolleston | Leicestershire | 52.59°N 00.92°W | SK7300 |
| Rollestone | Wiltshire | 51.18°N 01.90°W | SU0743 |
| Rollestone | Sheffield | 53.35°N 01.46°W | SK3684 |
| Rollestone Camp | Wiltshire | 51.19°N 01.87°W | SU0944 |
| Rolleston on Dove | Staffordshire | 52.84°N 01.65°W | SK2327 |
| Rolls Mill | Dorset | 50.91°N 02.32°W | ST7713 |
| Rolston | East Riding of Yorkshire | 53.88°N 00.16°W | TA2145 |
| Rolstone | North Somerset | 51.35°N 02.87°W | ST3962 |
| Rolvenden | Kent | 51.04°N 00.62°E | TQ8431 |
| Rolvenden Layne | Kent | 51.03°N 00.63°E | TQ8530 |
| Romaldkirk | Durham | 54.59°N 02.01°W | NY9922 |
| Romanby | North Yorkshire | 54.33°N 01.44°W | SE3693 |
| Roman Hill | Suffolk | 52.47°N 01.73°E | TM5493 |
| Romannobridge | Scottish Borders | 55.71°N 03.33°W | NT1648 |
| Romansleigh | Devon | 50.96°N 03.82°W | SS7220 |
| Romesdal | Highland | 57.49°N 06.34°W | NG4053 |
| Romford | Kent | 51.14°N 00.34°E | TQ6441 |
| Romford | Dorset | 50.88°N 01.90°W | SU0709 |
| Romford | Havering | 51.57°N 00.19°E | TQ5289 |
| Romiley | Stockport | 53.40°N 02.09°W | SJ9490 |
| Romney Marsh | Kent | 51.02°N 00.92°E | TR049294 |
| Romney Street | Kent | 51.32°N 00.20°E | TQ5461 |
| Romsey | Hampshire | 50.98°N 01.50°W | SU3521 |
| Romsey Town | Cambridgeshire | 52.20°N 00.14°E | TL4758 |
| Romsley | Shropshire | 52.43°N 02.32°W | SO7882 |
| Romsley | Worcestershire | 52.40°N 02.06°W | SO9679 |
| Romsley Hill | Worcestershire | 52.40°N 02.06°W | SO9678 |
| Ronaldsvoe | Orkney Islands | 58.82°N 02.98°W | ND4393 |
| Ronay | Western Isles | 57.48°N 07.17°W | NF898551 |
| Ronkswood | Worcestershire | 52.18°N 02.20°W | SO8654 |
| Rood End | Sandwell | 52.49°N 02.00°W | SP0088 |
| Rookby | Cumbria | 54.48°N 02.31°W | NY8010 |
| Rook End | Essex | 51.96°N 00.25°E | TL5532 |
| Rookhope | Durham | 54.77°N 02.11°W | NY9342 |
| Rooking | Cumbria | 54.52°N 02.92°W | NY4015 |
| Rookley | Isle of Wight | 50.64°N 01.29°W | SZ5083 |
| Rookley Green | Isle of Wight | 50.64°N 01.29°W | SZ5083 |
| Rooks Bridge | Somerset | 51.26°N 02.91°W | ST3652 |
| Rooksey Green | Suffolk | 52.12°N 00.80°E | TL9251 |
| Rooks Hill | Kent | 51.25°N 00.23°E | TQ5653 |
| Rooksmoor | Gloucestershire | 51.72°N 02.23°W | SO8403 |
| Rook's Nest | Somerset | 51.08°N 03.31°W | ST0833 |
| Rook Street | Wiltshire | 51.07°N 02.27°W | ST8131 |
| Rookwith | North Yorkshire | 54.26°N 01.69°W | SE2086 |
| Rookwood | West Sussex | 50.78°N 00.89°W | SZ7899 |
| Roos | East Riding of Yorkshire | 53.75°N 00.04°W | TA2930 |
| Roose | Cumbria | 54.11°N 03.19°W | SD2269 |
| Roosebeck | Cumbria | 54.09°N 03.14°W | SD2567 |
| Roosecote | Cumbria | 54.10°N 03.19°W | SD2268 |
| Roost End | Essex | 52.05°N 00.47°E | TL7043 |
| Rootfield | Highland | 57.53°N 04.42°W | NH5552 |
| Rootham's Green | Bedfordshire | 52.20°N 00.39°W | TL1057 |
| Rooting Street | Kent | 51.17°N 00.78°E | TQ9545 |
| Rootpark | South Lanarkshire | 55.76°N 03.67°W | NS9554 |
| Ropley | Hampshire | 51.07°N 01.08°W | SU6431 |
| Ropley Dean | Hampshire | 51.07°N 01.11°W | SU6231 |
| Ropley Soke | Hampshire | 51.09°N 01.07°W | SU6533 |
| Ropsley | Lincolnshire | 52.89°N 00.52°W | SK9934 |
| Rora | Aberdeenshire | 57.54°N 01.91°W | NK0550 |
| Rora Head | Orkney Islands | 58.87°N 03.42°W | ND178996 |
| Rorrington | Shropshire | 52.59°N 03.03°W | SJ3000 |
