= Wrixon =

Wrixon is a surname. Notable people with the surname include:

- Eric Wrixon (1947–2015), Northern Ireland musician
- Henry Wrixon (1839–1913), Australian barrister and politician
- Margaret White Wrixon (born 1944), British swimmer
- Maris Wrixon (1916–1999), American actress

== See also ==
- Rixon
