= Listed buildings in Preston St Mary =

Civil Parish in Suffolk, England

Preston St Mary is a village and civil parish in the Babergh District of Suffolk, England. It contains 25 listed buildings that are recorded in the National Heritage List for England. Of these one is grade I, one is grade II* and 23 are grade II.

This list is based on the information retrieved online from Historic England.

== Key ==
Grade	Criteria
I	Buildings that are of exceptional interest
II*	Particularly important buildings of more than special interest
II	Buildings that are of special interest

== Listing ==
Name	Grade	Location	Type	Completed (Note: The date given is the date used by Historic England as significant for the initial building or that of an important part in the structure's description.)	Date designated	Grid ref. (Note: The grid reference is based on the British national grid reference system, sometimes known as OSGB36, used by the Ordnance Survey.) Geo-coordinates	Notes	Entry number (Note: The "List Entry Number" is a unique number assigned to each listed building and scheduled monument by Historic England.)	Image	Wikidata
Barn at Mortimer's Farm	II	Brettenham Road, Preston St. Mary			10 July 1980	TL9437651232; 52°07′31″N 0°50′17″E		1182462	Upload Photo	Q26477710
Down Hall	II	Brettenham Road, Preston St. Mary			23 January 1958	TL9434351680; 52°07′45″N 0°50′16″E		1351591	Upload Photo	Q26634679
Millfield	II	Brettenham Road, Preston St. Mary			10 July 1980	TL9418550772; 52°07′16″N 0°50′06″E		1182458	Upload Photo	Q26477706
Mortimer's Farmhouse	II	Brettenham Road, Preston St. Mary			10 July 1980	TL9428951160; 52°07′29″N 0°50′12″E		1037054	Upload Photo	Q26288748
Dingley Dell	II	Brites Orchard, Whelp Street, Preston St. Mary			10 July 1980	TL9506849793; 52°06′43″N 0°50′51″E		1037060	Upload Photo	Q26288755
Church of St Mary	I	Church Lane, Preston St. Mary	church building		23 January 1958	TL9460250276; 52°07′00″N 0°50′27″E		1037055	Church of St Mary More images	Q17541827
Hall Cottage	II	Hall Road, Preston St. Mary			10 July 1980	TL9484649730; 52°06′42″N 0°50′39″E		1351592	Upload Photo	Q26634680
Preston Hall	II*	Hall Road, Preston St. Mary	house		23 January 1958	TL9468750245; 52°06′58″N 0°50′31″E		1182472	Preston Hall More images	Q17533727
Barn to the South of Rise Farmhouse	II	Lavenham Road, Preston St. Mary			10 July 1980	TL9312050486; 52°07′08″N 0°49′10″E		1182483	Upload Photo	Q26477729
Manor Farmhouse	II	Lavenham Road, Preston St. Mary			10 July 1980	TL9278950696; 52°07′15″N 0°48′53″E		1037057	Upload Photo	Q26288751
Priory Farmhouse	II	Lavenham Road, Preston St. Mary			10 July 1980	TL9377850640; 52°07′12″N 0°49′45″E		1182474	Upload Photo	Q26477721
Rise Farmhouse	II	Lavenham Road, Preston St. Mary			10 July 1980	TL9311650521; 52°07′09″N 0°49′10″E		1037056	Upload Photo	Q26288749
Hillhouse Farmhouse	II	Preston St. Mary			10 July 1980	TL9313149672; 52°06′42″N 0°49′09″E		1037053	Upload Photo	Q26288747
Rushbrook Farmhouse	II	Preston St. Mary			10 July 1980	TL9488051507; 52°07′39″N 0°50′44″E		1182452	Upload Photo	Q26477700
Old Thatches	II	Rookwood Lane, Preston St. Mary			10 July 1980	TL9410751344; 52°07′35″N 0°50′03″E		1182489	Upload Photo	Q26477735
Preston St Mary War Memorial	II	St Mary's Churchyard, Church Lane, CO10 9NQ, Preston St. Mary			20 April 2020	TL9457050263; 52°06′59″N 0°50′25″E		1469805	Upload Photo	Q97457562
Four Thatch Cottage	II	The Street, Preston St. Mary			10 July 1980	TL9445150425; 52°07′05″N 0°50′19″E		1351593	Upload Photo	Q26634681
Laurel Cottage	II	The Street, Preston St. Mary			10 July 1980	TL9421150571; 52°07′10″N 0°50′07″E		1182505	Upload Photo	Q26477750
Shelford House	II	The Street, Preston St. Mary			10 July 1980	TL9404750594; 52°07′11″N 0°49′59″E		1182523	Upload Photo	Q26477768
Six Bells Cottage	II	The Street, Preston St. Mary			10 July 1980	TL9440650420; 52°07′04″N 0°50′17″E		1037059	Upload Photo	Q26288753
Six Bells Inn	II	The Street, Preston St. Mary	inn		10 July 1980	TL9442150398; 52°07′04″N 0°50′18″E		1182508	Six Bells Inn More images	Q26477754
The Old Post Office and Hatherley Cottage	II	The Street, Preston St. Mary			10 July 1980	TL9435150492; 52°07′07″N 0°50′14″E		1037058	Upload Photo	Q26288752
Applebough Spring Cottage	II	Whelp Street, Preston St. Mary			10 July 1980	TL9475649648; 52°06′39″N 0°50′34″E		1284495	Upload Photo	Q26573258
Chestnuts	II	Whelp Street, Preston St. Mary			10 July 1980	TL9463849614; 52°06′38″N 0°50′28″E		1351555	Upload Photo	Q26634645
Manor Farmhouse	II	Whelp Street, Preston St. Mary			10 July 1980	TL9583349787; 52°06′42″N 0°51′31″E		1182534	Upload Photo	Q26477780

== See also ==
- Grade I listed buildings in Suffolk
- Grade II* listed buildings in Suffolk

== Sources ==
- Bettely, James; Pevsner, Nikolaus (2015) [1961], Suffolk: West, The Buildings of England, New Haven and London: Yale University Press, ISBN 978-0-300-19655-9
