= Hole Park =

Country house in Kent, England

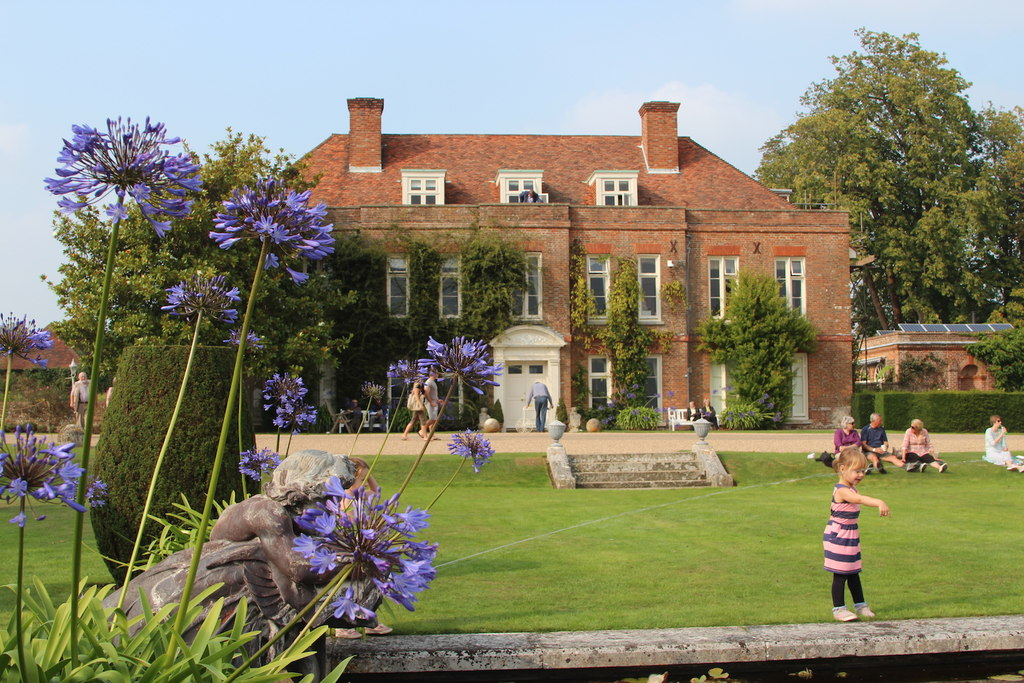

- Location within Kent

General information
- Status: Grade II listed
- Location: Rolvenden, Kent grid reference TQ 832 325, Hole Park, Benenden Road, Rolvenden, Cranbrook TN17 4JA, United Kingdom
- Coordinates: 51°3′44″N 0°36′47″E

Website
- www.holepark.com

Hole Park is a privately owned country house near the village of Rolvenden, in Kent, England. It is a Grade II listed building. The gardens, first opened in the 1920s, are regularly open to the public.

== Description ==
=== History ===
The earliest mention of the estate is in 1278, when Hole Park was owned by Henry de Hole. By the early 16th century it was owned by Robert Gybbon, a wealthy clothier. The family was joined by marriage in the early 18th century with the Monypennys of Maytham Hall. The house was built circa 1720.

In 1837 Thomas Gybbon Monypenny MP enlarged and refashioned the house in Pseudo Elizabethan style; he laid out modest ornamental gardens to the east of the house and enlarged the park. To achieve this he mortgaged the property to James Morrison, who subsequently became the owner. His son Frank Morrison was later the owner but never resided there. Instead the house was let to a series of tenants, at one time being an agricultural college for gentlemen. In 1910 the Morrison family tried to sell the estate, unsuccessfully at first with a speculator Cresswell briefly owning it until it was reoffered at auction in 1911.

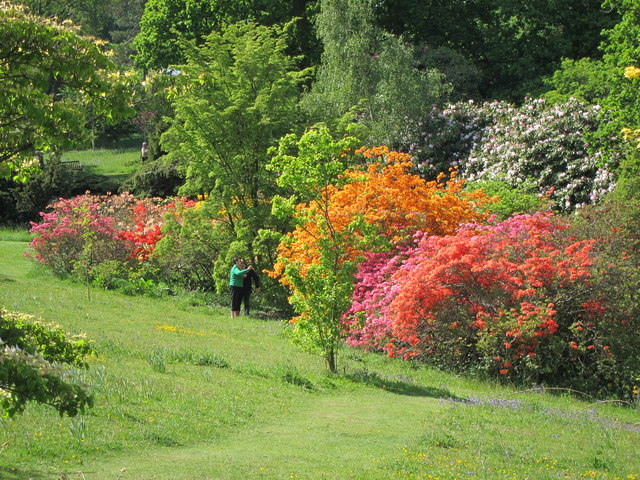
Azaleas in the gardens of Hole Park

Hole Park was purchased in 1911 by Colonel Arthur Barham, who with his father Sir George Barham had made a fortune in the dairying business. Sir George from relative poverty, an apprentice carpenter had founded The Express Dairy Company, bringing fresh milk to London on trains, subsequently giving Express Dairy to his eldest son Titus Barham and The Dairy Supply Company to his other surviving son (of 5), Arthur. DSC became the leading arm of United Dairies in the reorganisation of the dairy industry after the Great War.

Arthur retired as chairman of United Dairies in the early 1920s and set about creating a new garden for his new home, redesigned and enlarging the gardens, and they opened to the public in 1927, one of the first to be opened as part of the National Garden Scheme.

The house was requisitioned by the army in the Second World War. In 1951 David Barham (1926–2022), grandson of Arthur Barham, returned to the estate. Faced with the problem of what to do with the main house, empty since wartime requisition, David, with his wife Catherine (ne Bucknall) demolished the greater part of the pseudo Elizabeth house of 1837, removing the 5 gabled roof, wings and entire back half and reconstructed the current house to the design of local architect Dennis Brown, who used a water colour of the 1720 house in the church records as his model. David Barham lived at the house for 43 years from 1960, until he moved out in favour of his son. Edward, with his wife Clare and 3 children, remain at Hole Park.

=== Present day ===
The current residents, since 2003, are Edward Barham, great-grandson of Arthur Barham, and his family. He manages the gardens and the wider estate, and as of 2021 is chairman of the south-east region of Historic Houses. The gardens, area 15 acres (6 ha), set in wooded parkland of area 220 acres (89 ha), are opened regularly to the public.
