= Robert Ryece =

Robert Ryece (1555–1638) was an English antiquary who wrote A Breviary of Suffolk in 1618, a book which was not published until 1902.

Ryece's family are recorded living in Preston St Mary, a village in Babergh Hundred, Suffolk since the fifteenth century, owning the manor house Preston Hall. He was the third member of the family to be called Robert. He married Mary Appleton (1574–1630), of Little Waldingfield."

He and his wife were buried in St Mary's Church, Preston.

== The Breviary of Suffolk ==
The manuscript of The Breviary of Suffolk was numbered 3873 in the Harleian Collection, one of the main "closed" collections of the British Library. Lord Francis Hervey edited its publication in 1902 after Mrs Salmon had transcribed the original manuscript. The transcription preserved the original spelling, punctuation, and syntax, although they diverged from common usage. Hervey opined that such vagaries did not obscure the meaning and indeed leant the book a "not unpleasing sense of quaintness redolent of his time and his surroundings". The Book was published as Suffolk in the XVIIth Century: The Breviary of Suffolk By Robert Reyce, 1618. Now Published for the First Time from the Ms. In the British Museum by John Murray of London.
