= Rolvenden Layne =

Hamlet in Kent, England

Coordinates: 51.0412°N 0.6421°E

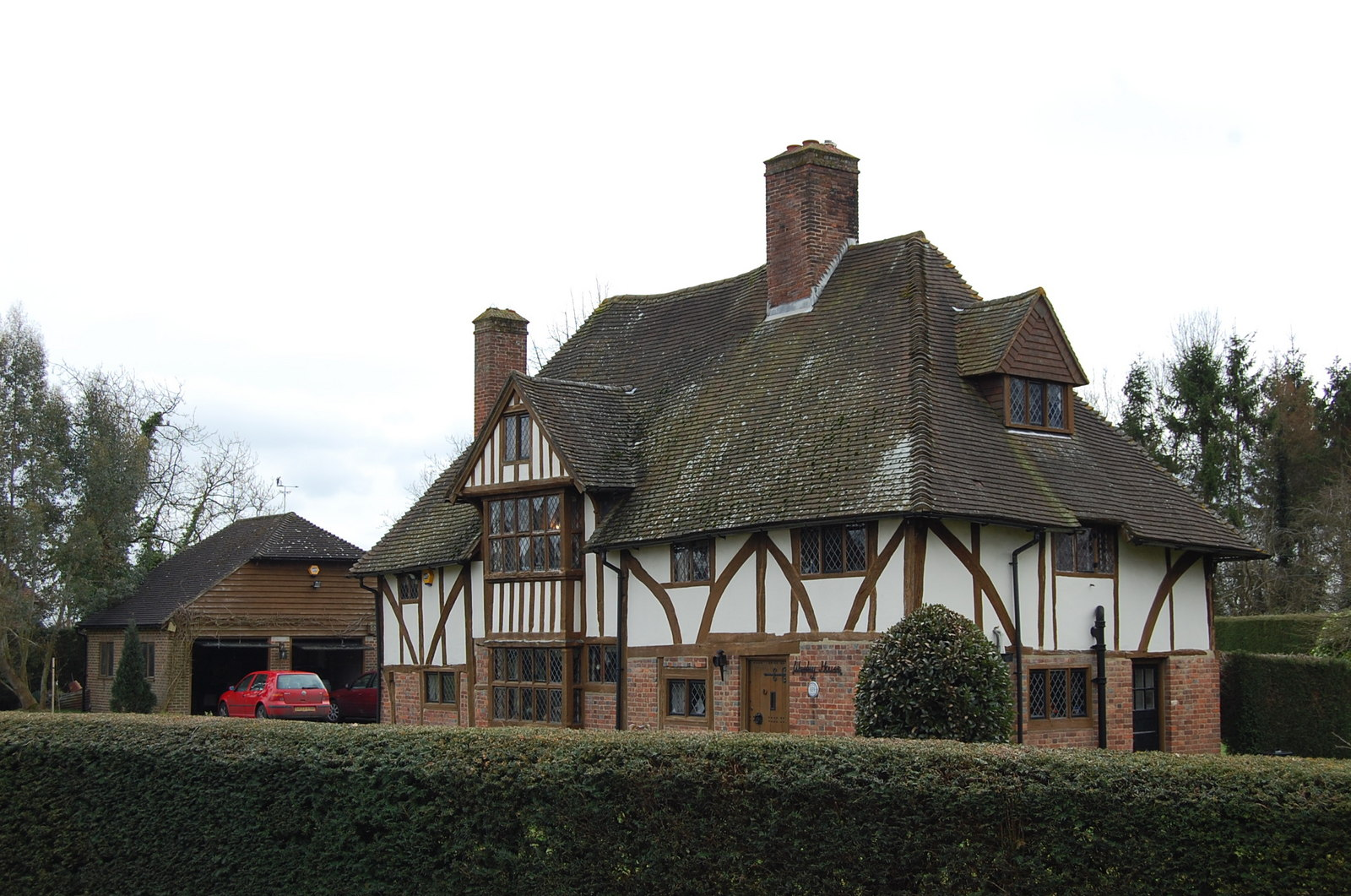
- Wesley House, Rolvenden Layne

- Location within Kent
- OS grid reference: TQ853302
- Civil parish: Rolvenden
- District: Ashford
- Shire county: Kent
- Region: South East
- Country: England
- Sovereign state: United Kingdom
- Post town: Cranbrook
- Postcode district: TN17
- Dialling code: 01580
- Police: Kent
- Fire: Kent
- Ambulance: South East Coast
- UK Parliament: Weald of Kent

Rolvenden Layne is a hamlet within the civil parish of Rolvenden in the Ashford District of Kent, England. It is located approximately one mile (1.6 km) south of Rolvenden, with a public house, the Ewe & Lamb.

Rolvenden village originally consisted of the Streyte, located along what is now the A28 Ashford to Hastings road, which was almost entirely burned down in 1665, during the Great Plague (except for the church, pub and some farms). This caused the villagers to abandon the Streyte and move a mile down the hill to the common land of the Layne during the 1660s. John Wesley preached in the 18th century in a Tudor house that is now called Wesley House. Later the villages returned to the Streyte.

Rolvenden is approximately ten square miles in area, consisting largely of farming and rural activities. Rolvenden Layne is within the High Weald Area of Outstanding Natural Beauty, the South Kent development area and is also a conservation area.

Frances Hodgson Burnett rented Great Maytham Hall, located between Rolvenden and Rolvenden Layne, in 1898. After her departure in 1907 the mansion was rebuilt by Edwin Lutyens.

The actor Ian Holm lived in Rolvenden Layne.

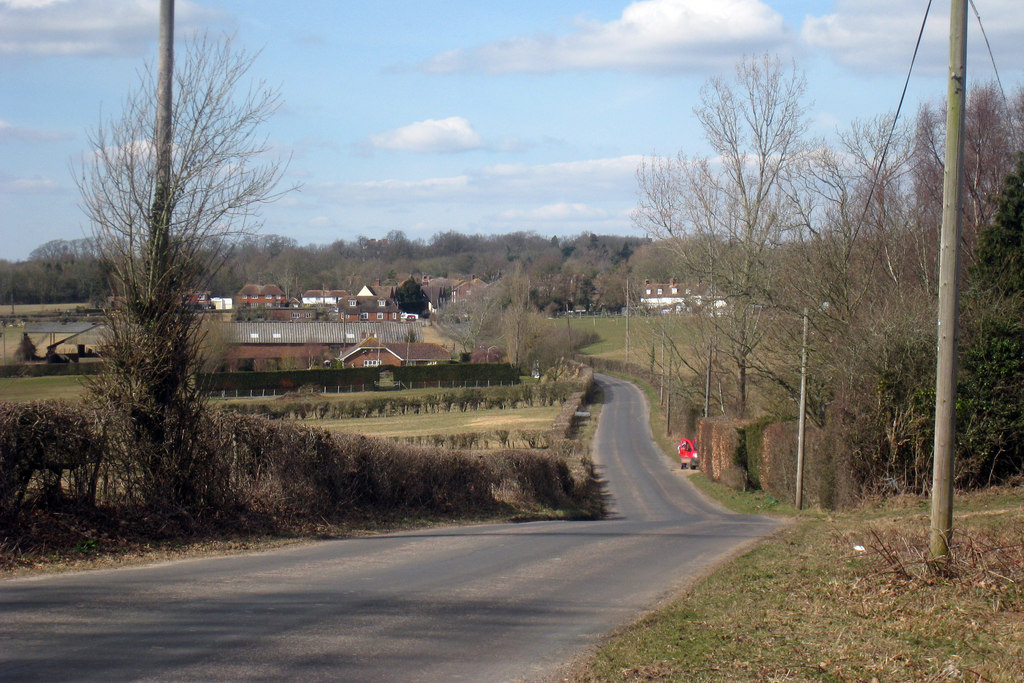
View over Rolvenden Layne

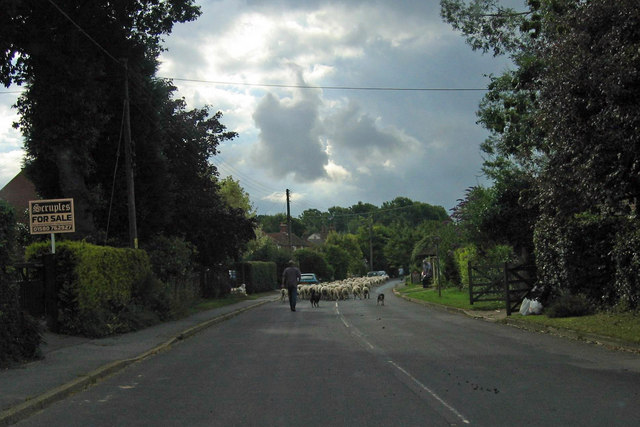
Rush hour in Rolvenden Layne

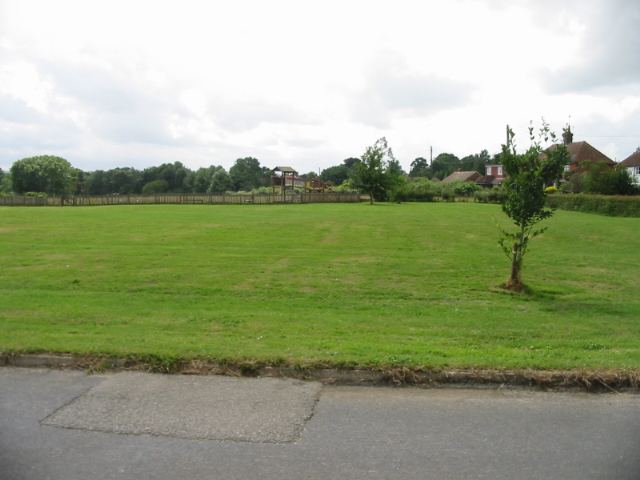
Playing fields

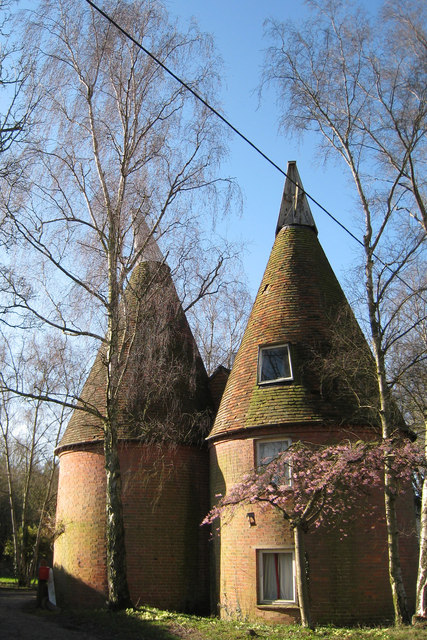
Oast House, Frogs Lane

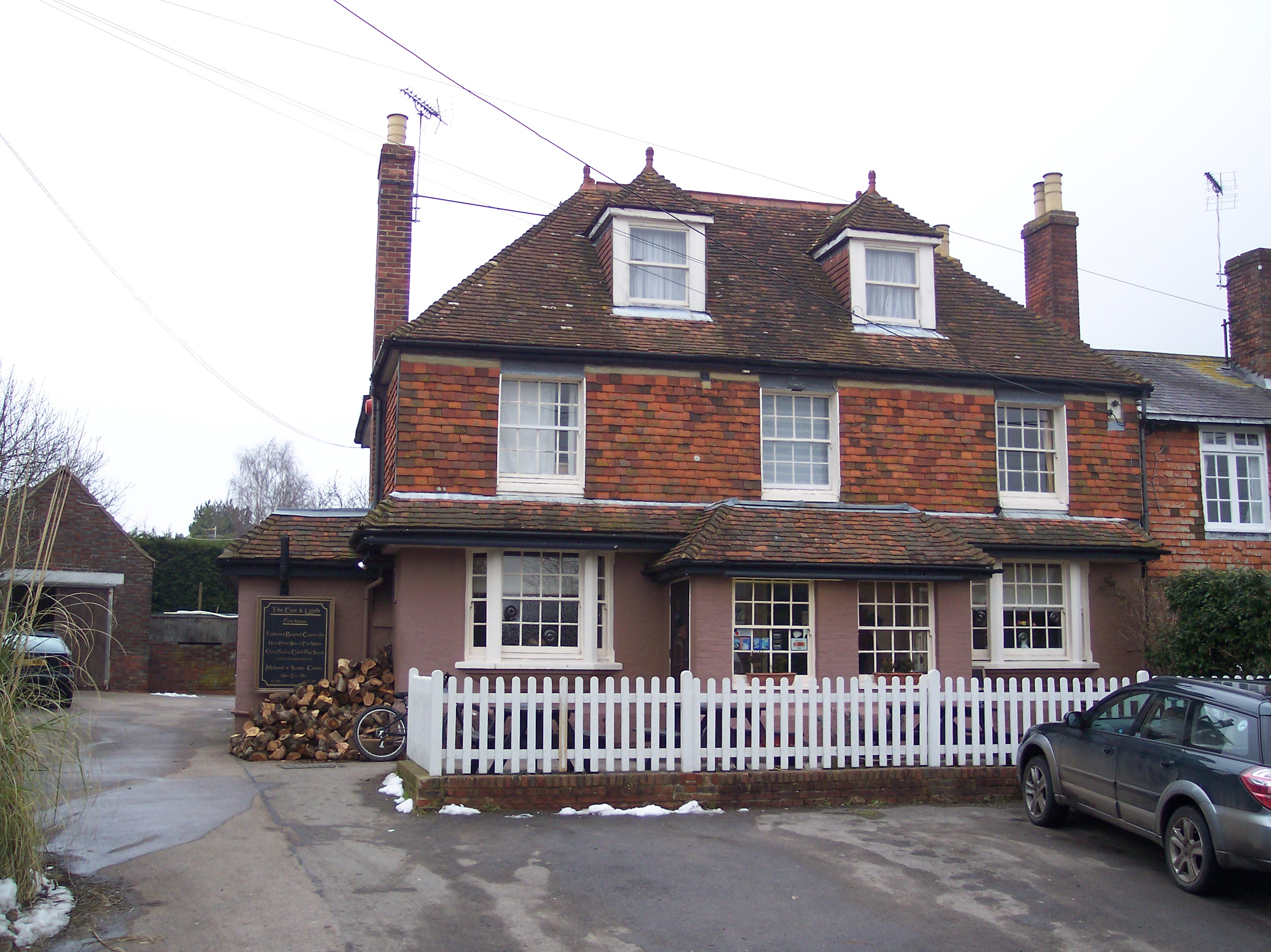
The Ewe and Lamb Pub
