= Rolvenden War Memorial =

War memorial in Rolvenden, Kent, England

- United Kingdom
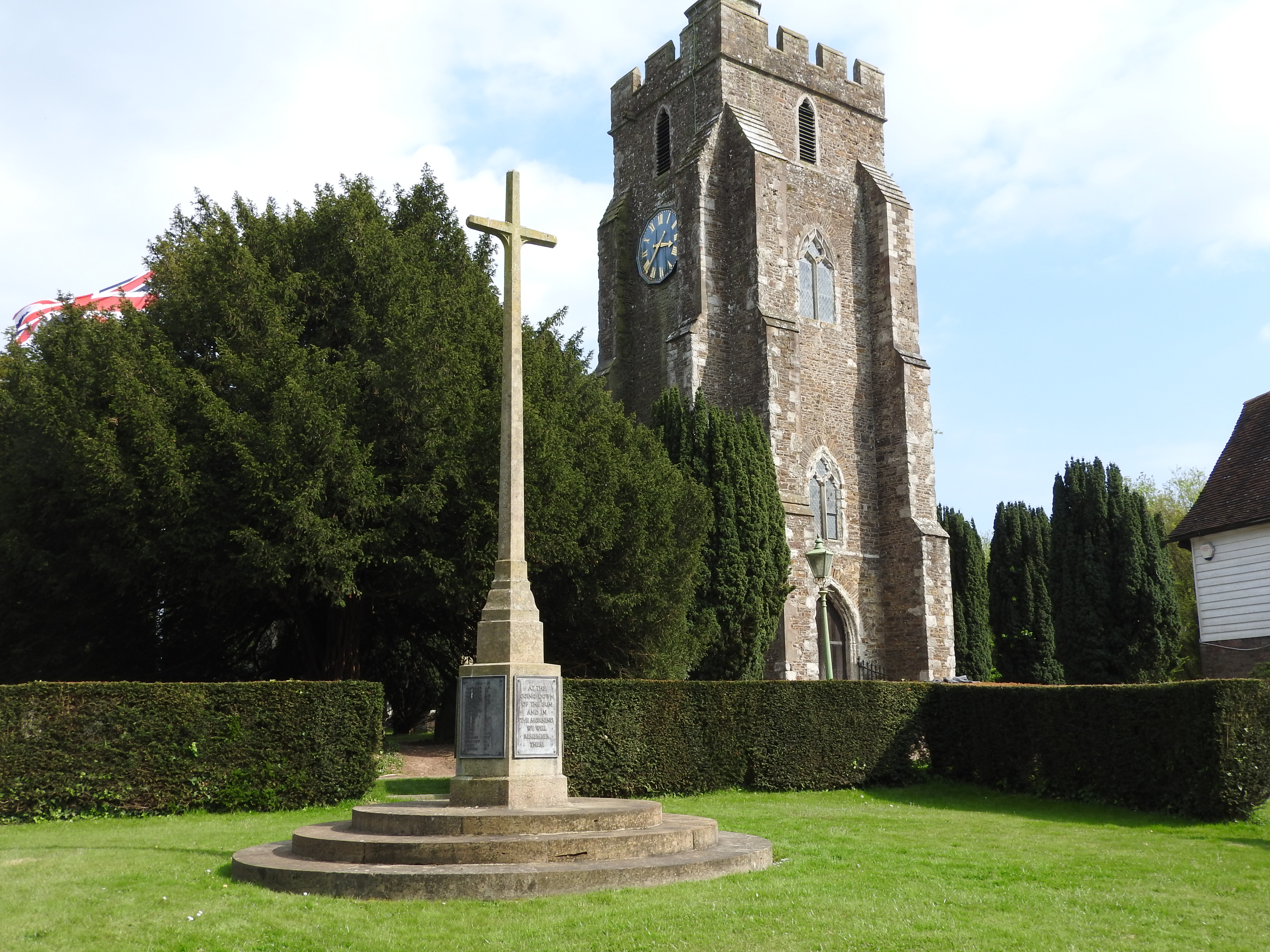
- For men from Rolvenden killed in the First World War
- Unveiled: 28 May 1922
- Location: 51.05085°N 0.63060°E; Rolvenden, Kent near Ashford
- Designed by: Sir Edwin Lutyens

Listed Building – Grade II
- Official name: Rolvenden War Memorial
- Designated: 1 August 2000
- Reference no.: 1381140

Rolvenden War Memorial is a First World War memorial in the village of Rolvenden, Kent, in south-eastern England. Designed by Sir Edwin Lutyens, the memorial was unveiled in 1922 and is today a grade II listed building.

== Background ==
In the aftermath of the First World War and its unprecedented casualties, thousands of war memorials were built across Britain. Amongst the most prominent designers of memorials was the architect Sir Edwin Lutyens, described by Historic England as "the leading English architect of his generation". Lutyens designed the Cenotaph on Whitehall in London, which became the focus for the national Remembrance Sunday commemorations, as well as the Thiepval Memorial to the Missing—the largest British war memorial anywhere in the world—and the Stone of Remembrance which appears in all large Commonwealth War Graves Commission cemeteries and in several of Lutyens's civic war memorials. The memorial at Rolvenden is unique among Lutyens' war memorials—although he designed multiple crosses, Rolvenden's is much more slender and sparse then his conventional "War Cross".

Prior to the outbreak of the First World War, Lutyens established his reputation by designing country houses for wealthy clients. Many of Lutyens' commissions for war memorials originated with pre-war friends and clients. Lutyens had undertaken renovation work at the nearby Great Maytham Hall, completed in 1912, for Harold "Jack" Tennant, who chaired the war memorial committee in Rolvenden and made significant donations towards its funding. The committee identified a site outside St Mary's Church, which they purchased. They approached Lutyens in December 1919 and he conducted a site visit in the summer of 1920. The site required an existing carpenter's shop to be demolished which depleted the memorial fund and led to a request to Lutyens for a simple design. Lutyens drafted a proposal and a mock-up was erected on the site, while Messrs Wallis of Maidstone provided an estimated cost of £215. The project was delayed by objections from local ex-servicemen, who were unhappy about the proximity of the memorial to the church. The objections were eventually set aside and construction work began in the middle of 1922.

== History and design ==
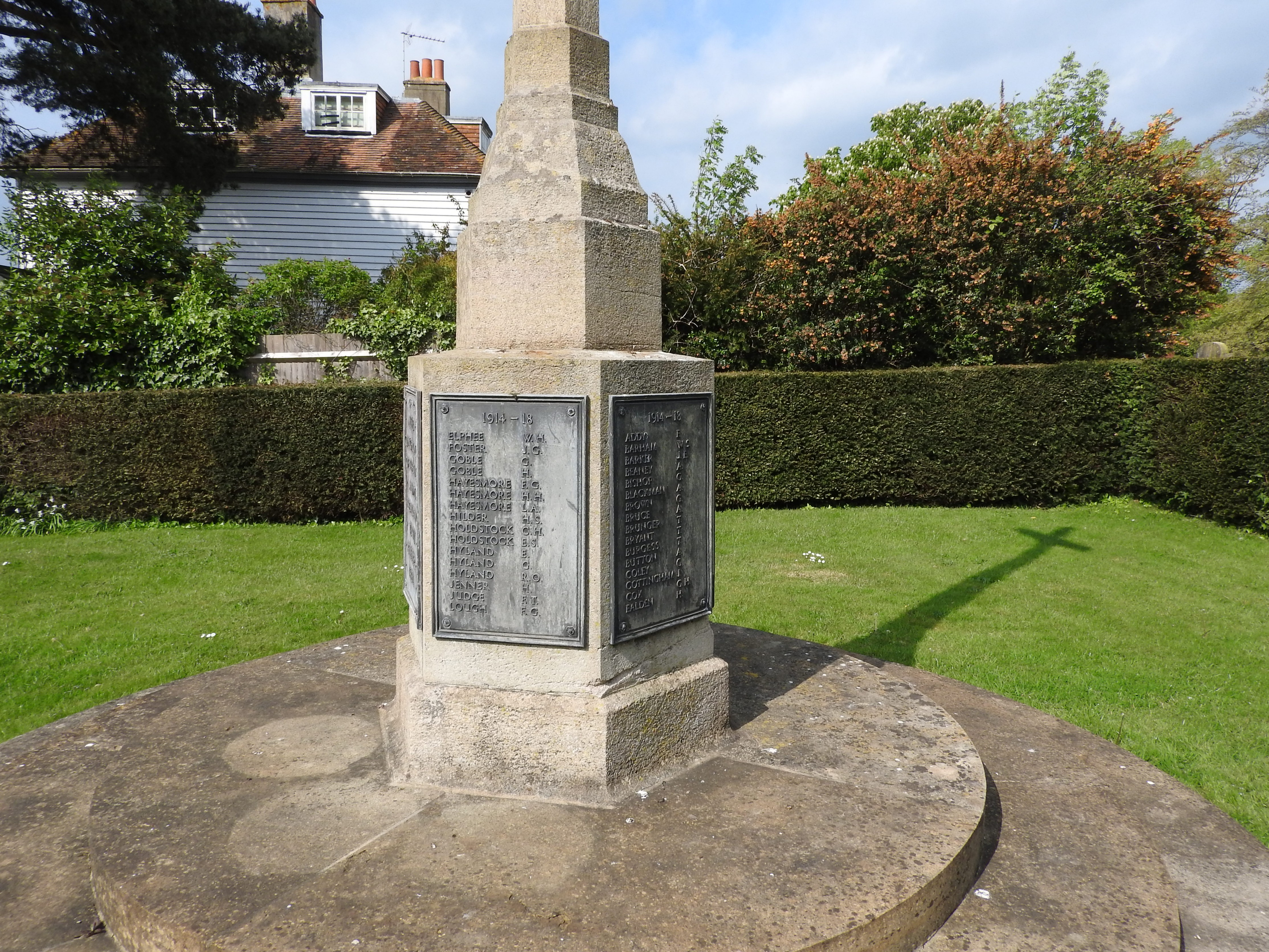
Two panels

The completed memorial was unveiled by Randall Davidson, the Archbishop of Canterbury, on 8 November 1922. The final cost was £255, plus Lutyens' 10 per cent fee and £6 expenses.

The memorial consists of a single tall cross in Clipsham stone, significantly more slender than most of Lutyens' other war memorials and a significant departure from his War Cross design used for village war memorials elsewhere. The cross sits on an octagonal plinth, which itself is set on a base of three stone steps—circular, unlike the square steps commonly seen on other Lutyens works. Metal plaques affixed to the plinth contain the names of the dead and the inscription, from the Ode of Remembrance, "AT THE GOING DOWN OF THE SUN AND IN THE MORNING WE WILL REMEMBER THEM".
