= Listed buildings in Mappleton =

Mappleton is a civil parish in the county of the East Riding of Yorkshire, England. It contains two listed buildings that are recorded in the National Heritage List for England. Of these, one is listed at Grade II*, the middle of the three grades, and the other is at Grade II, the lowest grade. The parish contains the village of Mappleton and the surrounding area. Both the listed buildings are in the village, and consist of a church and a farmhouse.

== Key ==
Grade	Criteria
II*	Particularly important buildings of more than special interest
II	Buildings of national importance and special interest

== Buildings ==
Name and location	Photograph	Date	Notes	Grade
All Saints' Church; 53.87655°N 0.13743°W		14th century	The oldest part of the church is the tower, and the rest was largely rebuilt in 1855–56 by Mallinson and Healey. It is built in stone, with dressings in brick and sandstone, and a Welsh slate roof. The church consists of a nave, a north aisle, a south porch, a chancel with a north vestry, and a west steeple. The steeple has a tower with three stages, a chamfered plinth, quoins, a three-light pointed west window, slit windows, two-light pointed bell openings, and a splay-footed spire with bands of two colours.	II*
Gray's Farmhouse; 53.87862°N 0.13671°W	—	Early 18th century	The farmhouse is in reddish brick, rendered and colourwashed on the front, with a dentilled eaves band, and a pantile roof with brick copings. There are two storeys and three bays. On the front is a blocked doorway with an elliptical head, and the entrance is in the left return. The windows are a mix of horizontally sliding sashes and casements, those on the ground floor under elliptical arches. Inside, there are two partly blocked inglenook fireplaces.	II
