= Great Cowden =

Hamlet in the East Riding of Yorkshire, England

Coordinates: 53.866305°N 0.130984°W

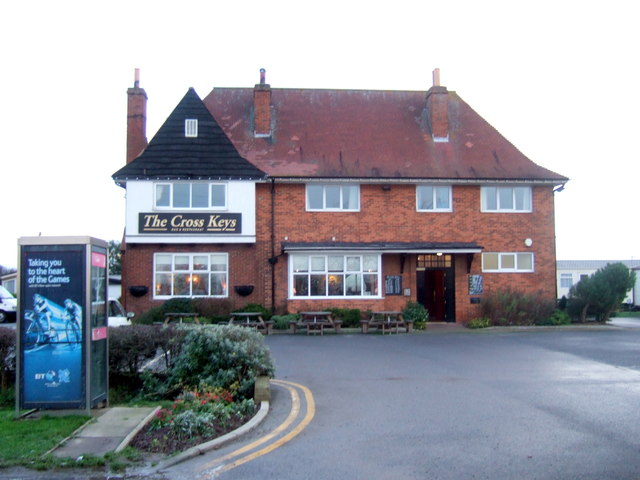
- The Cross Keys

- Location within the East Riding of Yorkshire
- OS grid reference: TA230427
  - London: 160 mi (260 km) S
- Civil parish: Mappleton
- Unitary authority: East Riding of Yorkshire
- Ceremonial county: East Riding of Yorkshire
- Region: Yorkshire and the Humber
- Country: England
- Sovereign state: United Kingdom
- Post town: HULL
- Postcode district: HU11
- Dialling code: 01964
- Police: Humberside
- Fire: Humberside
- Ambulance: Yorkshire
- UK Parliament: Bridlington and The Wolds

Great Cowden is a hamlet in the civil parish of Mappleton, in the East Riding of Yorkshire, England, in an area known as Holderness. It is situated approximately 3 miles (5 km) south of Hornsea and lies just east of the B1242 road on the North Sea coast.

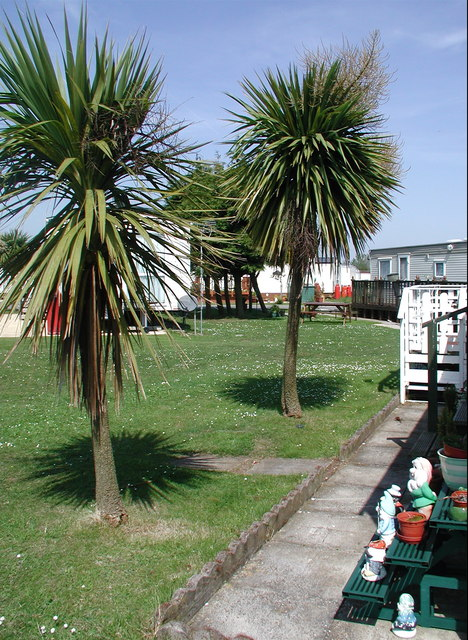
Caravan park near Great Cowden

The name Cowden derives from the Old English coldūn meaning 'coal hill'.

In 1823 Cowden (as Great and Little Cowden) was also known as 'Coldon', and was in the parish of Mappleton. The parish incumbent's living was under the patronage of the King, although at the time the parish church had been swallowed by the sea. Population was 146, with occupations including eleven farmers.
