= Mappleton =

Village and civil parish in the East Riding of Yorkshire, England

Coordinates: 53°52′40″N 0°08′13″W

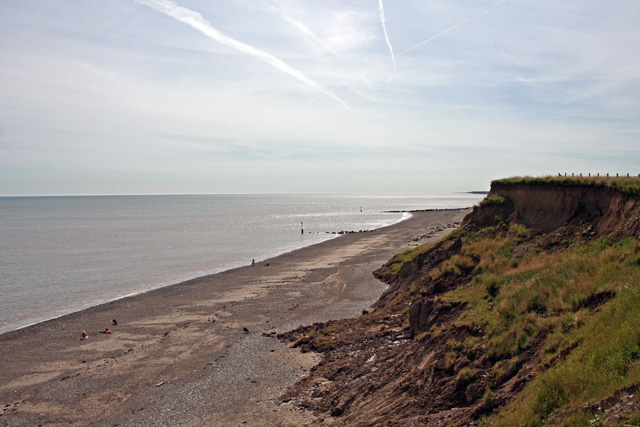
- The sands at Mappleton

- Location within the East Riding of Yorkshire
- Population: 342 (2011 census)
- OS grid reference: TA225440
  - London: 160 mi (260 km) S
- Civil parish: Mappleton
- Unitary authority: East Riding of Yorkshire
- Ceremonial county: East Riding of Yorkshire
- Region: Yorkshire and the Humber
- Country: England
- Sovereign state: United Kingdom
- Post town: HORNSEA
- Postcode district: HU18
- Dialling code: 01964
- Police: Humberside
- Fire: Humberside
- Ambulance: Yorkshire
- UK Parliament: Bridlington and The Wolds

Mappleton is a village and civil parish in the East Riding of Yorkshire, England. It is situated on the North Sea coastline in an area known as Holderness, lying approximately 3 miles (5 km) south of the seaside resort of Hornsea. The civil parish is formed by the village of Mappleton and the hamlets of Cowden, Great Cowden and Rolston. According to the 2011 UK census, Mappleton parish had a population of 342, an increase on the 2001 UK census figure of 249.

The Anglican All Saints' Church, Mappleton is a Grade II* listed building.

== History ==
The name Mappleton derives from the Old English mapeltūn meaning 'maple tree settlement'.

In 1823 Mappleton was a civil parish in the Wapentake of Holderness and the Liberty of St Peter's. The ecclesiastical parish and church living was under the patronage of the Archdeacon of the East Riding. A public school was established in 1820 by subscription and run under the ideas of educationalist Andrew Bell. Population at the time was 187, including the hamlet of Rolston (then 'Rowlston'). Occupations included six farmers, a carpenter, a corn miller, and a schoolmaster who was also the parish clerk. Two carriers operated between the village and Hull twice weekly.

In 1991, sea defences were built in order to protect the village and B1242 main road from intense sea erosion that had threatened it - Holderness is the most rapidly eroding coastline in Europe. The cliffs had been eroded at a rate of between 8 and 11 yards (7 and 10 m) per year on average. The £2 million project created two large rock groynes to trap materials that are carried in the waves during longshore drift as well as revetments to break the waves. In order to protect the cliffs from undercutting, their gradient was also reduced artificially.

The success of this project has created a larger higher sandy beach for Mappleton, and the erosion has slowed to a point where it is no longer a threat to the settlement. Due to these sea defences, the area directly south of the village now suffers from an even greater rate of erosion.

== See also ==
- Listed buildings in Mappleton
