= All Saints' Church, Mappleton =

Church in Mappleton, East Riding of Yorkshire, England

Coordinates: 53°52′36″N 0°08′15″W

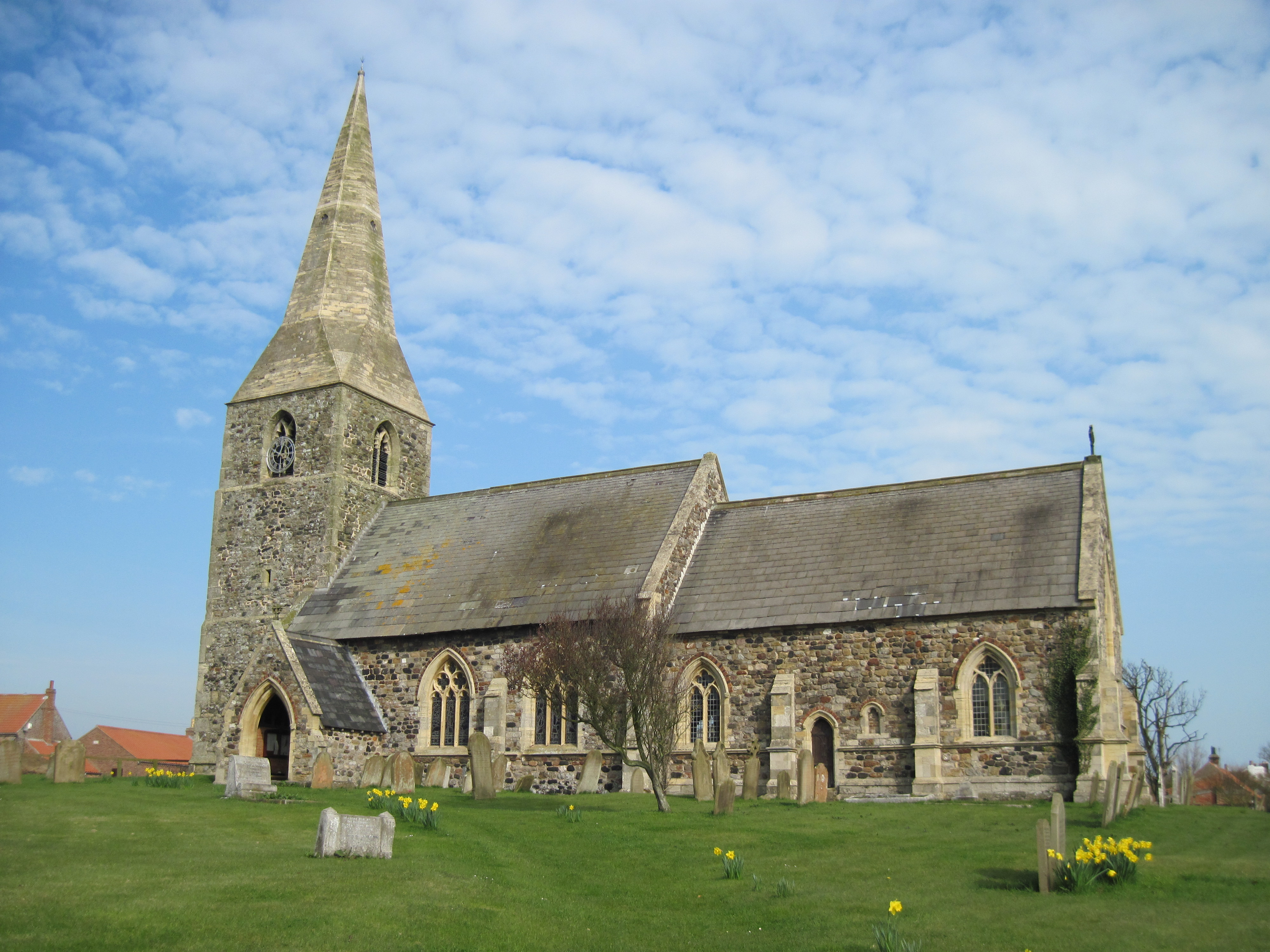
The church, in 2009

All Saints' Church is the parish church of Mappleton, a village in the East Riding of Yorkshire, in England.

The church was first recorded in 1115. It was either altered or rebuilt in the 13th century, then around 1400 a north aisle and tower were added, and the nave was enlarged, the oldest parts of the current building dating from this period. The church was largely rebuilt in 1855–1856 by Mallinson and Healey. In 1940, the glass in eight windows was destroyed in an air raid. Around 1955, the east window was replaced, along with the glass in the other windows. The building was grade II* listed in 1966.

The church is built of stone, with dressings in brick and sandstone, and a Welsh slate roof. The church consists of a nave, a north aisle, a south porch, a chancel with a north vestry, and a west steeple. The steeple has a tower with three stages, a chamfered plinth, quoins, a three-light pointed west window, slit windows, two-light pointed bell openings, and a splay-footed spire with bands of two colours. Inside, there is an octagonal 19th-century font.

== See also ==
- Grade II* listed buildings in the East Riding of Yorkshire
- Listed buildings in Mappleton
