= St Mary's Church, Preston, Suffolk =

St Mary's Church, Preston Suffolk
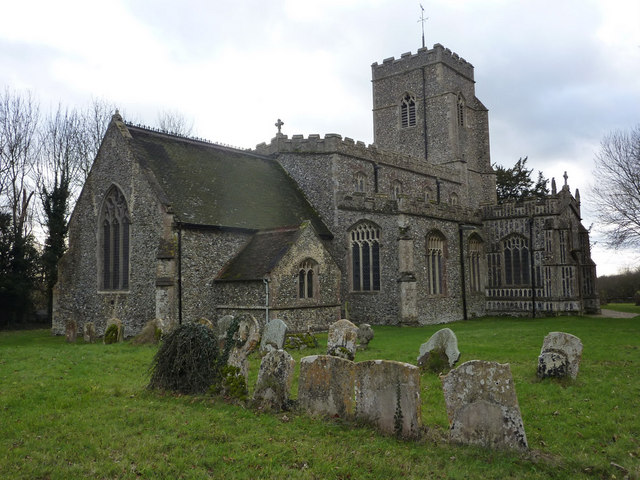
- St Mary's Church, Preston Suffolk
- 52.1165°N 0.8409°E
- Address: Church Lane, Preston St Mary
- Denomination: Church of England

History
- Dedication: St Mary the Virgin

Architecture
- Architect: The Master of Stowlangtoft

Administration
- Diocese: Diocese of St Edmundsbury and Ipswich
- Deanery: Lavenham
- Parish: Preston St Mary

St Mary's Church is the parish church for Preston St Mary, in the county of Suffolk, England. Originally built in the 14th century it suffered lightning damage in 1758, and was substantially restored by Arthur Blomfield in 1868. It is a Grade I listed building.

The antiquarian Robert Ryece (1555–1638) is buried to the north side of the altar and his wife to the south.

== Rectors ==
- 1578 Henry Sandes was presented by Robert Ryece to be installed as vicar of the parish. By 1582 he left to take up the position of preacher at nearby Boxford.
- 1644 Nicholas Coleman was ejected from his position as rector by the Earl of Manchester following depositions presented to the Suffolk Committee for Scandalous Ministries accusing him of being inclined towards catholicism, a refusal to administer the parliamentary covenant, drunkenness and defaming local puritan ministers Samuel Fairclough of Kedington and John Smith of Cockfield.
