= Rixon =

Rixon is a surname which may refer to:

- Bill Rixon (1941–2003), Australian politician
- Cheryl Rixon (born 1954), Australian actress
- Steve Rixon (born 1954), Australian former cricketer
- Rixon Corozo (born 1981), Ecuadorian footballer

Rixson and Rickson are variations of Rixon:

- Denis Rixson
- Rickson Gracie
- Joe Rickson

== See also ==
- Fort Rixon, a village in the Republic of Zimbabwe
- Rixon, Dorset, a village in Dorset, England
