= Rooksey Green =

Hamlet in Suffolk, England

Coordinates: 52.128°N 0.811°E

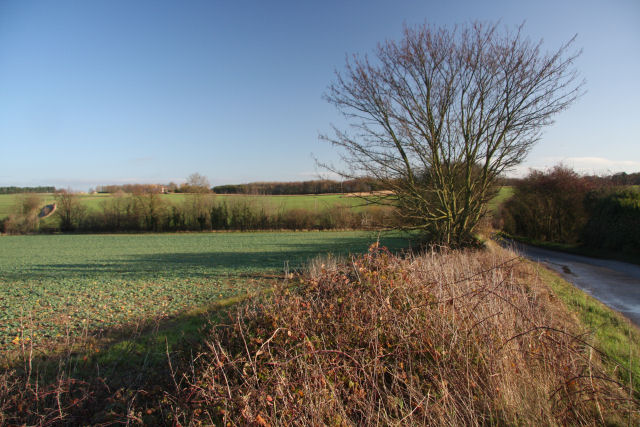
- Rookwood Lane

- Location within Suffolk
- Civil parish: Preston St Mary
- District: Babergh
- Shire county: Suffolk
- Region: East
- Country: England
- Sovereign state: United Kingdom
- Police: Suffolk
- Fire: Suffolk
- Ambulance: East of England

Rooksey Green is a hamlet in the civil parish of Preston St Mary, in the Babergh district in the county of Suffolk, ENgland.

== Other nearby settlements ==
Other nearby settlements include the villages of Cockfield, Lavenham and Thorpe Morieux.
