= Ridgeway, Staffordshire =

Hamlet in Staffordshire, England

Coordinates: 53.081°N 2.166°W

Ridgeway
- Location within Staffordshire
- OS grid reference: SJ8953
- District: Staffordshire Moorlands
- Unitary authority: Stoke-on-Trent
- Shire county: Staffordshire
- Region: West Midlands
- Country: England
- Sovereign state: United Kingdom
- Post town: Stoke-on-Trent
- Postcode district: ST6
- Dialling code: 01782
- Police: Staffordshire
- Fire: Staffordshire
- Ambulance: West Midlands
- UK Parliament: Stoke-on-Trent

Ridgeway is a hamlet on the boundary of Brown Edge and Stoke-on-Trent in Staffordshire, England.
