= Rolvenden =

Village in Kent, England

Coordinates: 51.053°N 0.631°E

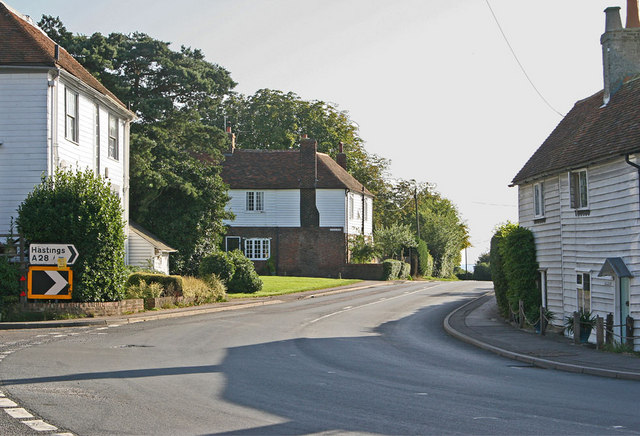
- Weatherboarded houses, Rolvenden

- Location within Kent
- Area: 23.28 km^{2} (8.99 sq mi)
- Population: 1,414 (Civil Parish 2011)
  - Density: 61/km^{2} (160/sq mi)
- OS grid reference: TQ843315
  - London: 46 mi (74 km) NW
- Civil parish: Rolvenden
- District: Ashford
- Shire county: Kent
- Region: South East
- Country: England
- Sovereign state: United Kingdom
- Post town: Cranbrook
- Postcode district: TN17
- Dialling code: 01580
- Police: Kent
- Fire: Kent
- Ambulance: South East Coast
- UK Parliament: Weald of Kent

Rolvenden is a village and civil parish in the Ashford District of Kent, England. The village is centred on the A28 Ashford to Hastings road, 5 miles (8.0 km) south-west of Tenterden.

The settlement of Rolvenden Layne, south of Rolvenden, is also part of the parish and shares in its shops and amenities.

== History ==
The village of Rolvenden dates from Anglo-Saxon times. The name 'Rolvenden' may originate from a chieftain Hroþwulf (Hrothwulf), and would refer to the "denn or pasture of Hroþwulf's people." Den is the jutish word for swine pastures coming to connote the same but with associated hamlets or isolated farmsteads as well as in many instances cultivated land.

Rolvenden is listed in the Domesday Book of 1086 as "Rovindene". In the reign of Edward III this was changed to Riolvinden, and then changed again to Rounden in the late 17th century.

Rolvenden village originally had its sole population centre as a short linear settlement, the Street, along part of what is now the A28 Ashford to Hastings road. This was almost entirely burned down in 1665 during the Great Plague (except for the church and pub). This caused the villagers to abandon the Street and move a mile down the hill to the common land of the Layne during the 1660s. Already there was the Tudor house, where John Wesley later preached in the 18th century. The villagers later returned to rebuild the Street, resulting in the two small neighbourhoods: the Streyte and the younger, smaller and quieter Layne that can be seen today.

The population declined between 1830 and 1850, when many people left during and after the Swing Riots. This was caused by the public vestry system of Rolvenden parish making the conscious decision to provide the poor with a single payment for assisted passages to the colonies, as opposed to large ongoing payments for parish relief.

Rolvenden parish is now approximately ten square miles in area, consisting largely of farming and rural activities, with an increasing number of professional, craft and tourist services. Rolvenden is in the High Weald Area of Outstanding Natural Beauty.

== Landmarks ==
The parish church was commissioned and supervised by monks from Canterbury in around 1220, has remained largely unchanged since 1480 and is dedicated to St Mary the Virgin. The 14th-century font has the arms of the Culpeper family on it, before their later prominence in the early administration of British North America. The war memorial in the churchyard was designed by Edwin Lutyens.

An oddity of the church is the Squire's pew, a room upstairs furnished with a table and Chippendale chairs, built for the Gibbons family from Hole Park for separately looking down on the main congregation.

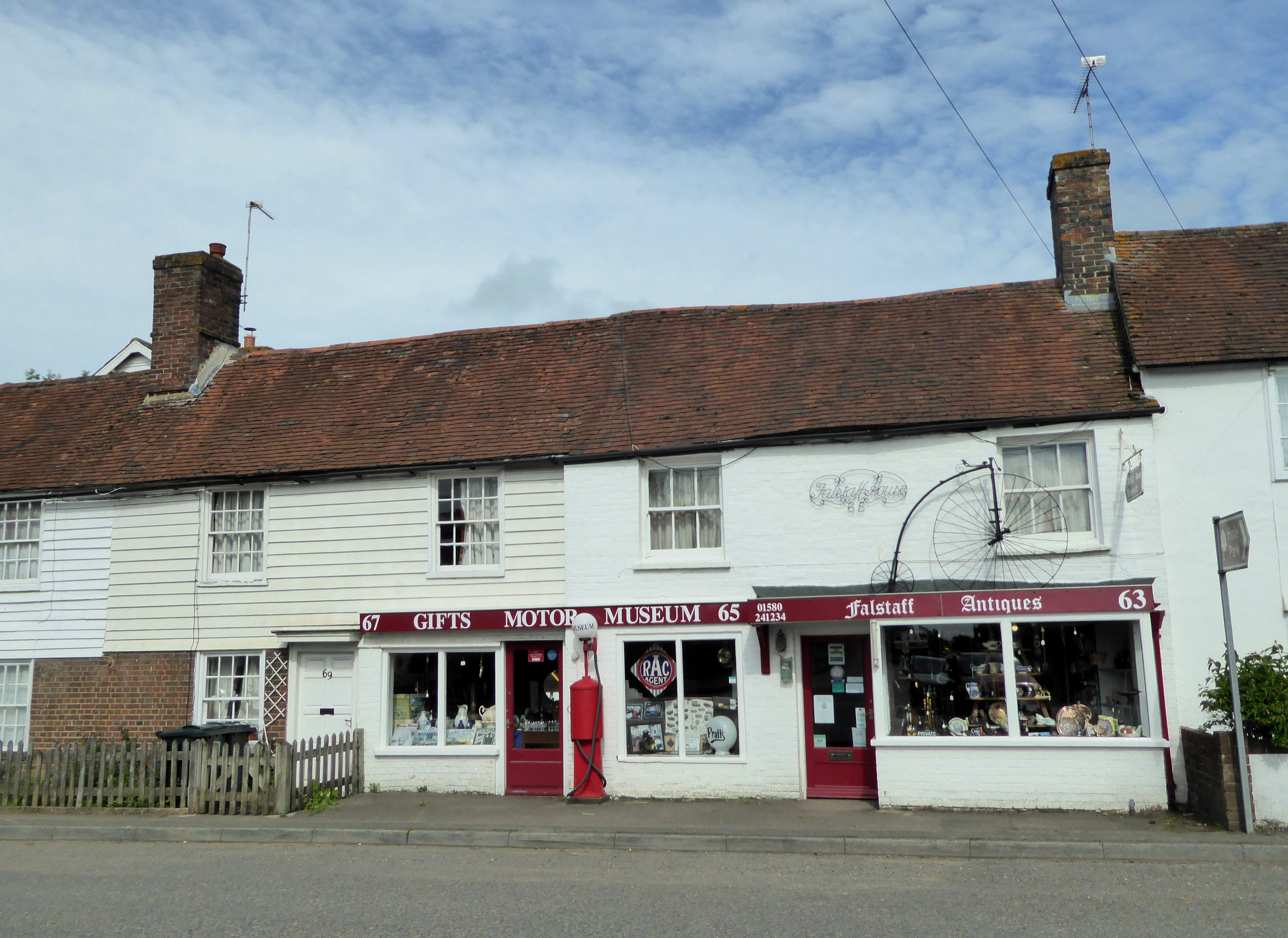
The motor museum in Rolvenden

The Reverend John Frankesh of Rolvenden became one of the Kent Marian Martyrs when he was burned at the stake in Canterbury on 12 July 1555 – he is named among the 41 martyrs inscribed on the Martyrs' Memorial, near Wincheap Street, Canterbury and in Foxe's Book of Martyrs.

Frances Hodgson Burnett rented Great Maytham Hall, down from the higher land towards Rolvenden Layne, in 1898 and a blocked-up door in the old walled garden inspired her to write the well known children's novel The Secret Garden. After her departure in 1907 the mansion was rebuilt in 1910 by Edwin Lutyens for the Rt Hon H.J. Tennant. The estate dates from Saxon times and at least four Norman lords had manors here. The Lutyens hall has since been divided into privately owned apartments. The gardens are not open to the public.. The grade II listed Rolvenden War Memorial, erected in 1922, was designed by Lutyens at Tennant's instigation.

Hole Park on the Benenden Road opens its gardens to the public under the National Gardens Scheme. Edward Gibbon lived there and wrote a bestseller, The History of the Decline and Fall of the Roman Empire, which was published between 1776 and 1788.

Rolvenden Windmill is also on the Benenden Road. This restored post mill, first mentioned c.1580 and of a type now rare in Kent, is now probably the best surviving example in the county. Its restoration was carried out in 1956 as a memorial to John Nicholas Barham who, according to the inscription, "lived his short life within sight of it" and died in August 1955, just before his eighteenth birthday. The mill, which is privately owned and does not open to the public, stands on a little hill and was featured in the Tommy Steele film Half a Sixpence.

== Economy, shops and amenities ==
Korker Sausages started as small butchers in October 1954, now produces over 15 tonnes of sausages a week.

The Kent and East Sussex Railway has its workshops near Rolvenden station.

A collection of historic vehicles is housed on Rolvenden High Street in an antiques outlet. It specializes in Morgan three-wheeler motor cars with other vintage cars, motorcycles, bicycles, displays of toy and model cars.

There is a small shop situated in the heart of the village. There are two public houses, The Bull Inn which also serves as a restaurant and The Star. There is another public house in Rolvenden Layne called The Ewe and Lamb.

Rolvenden has its own village hall which is available to hire.

== Transport ==
The Kent and East Sussex Railway is on the parish eastern border. The A28 between Margate and Hastings forms the main high street of Rolvenden. Other roads are either single track country lanes of small subsidiary roads. A bus service from Hastings to Ashford runs through the village.

== Gallery ==
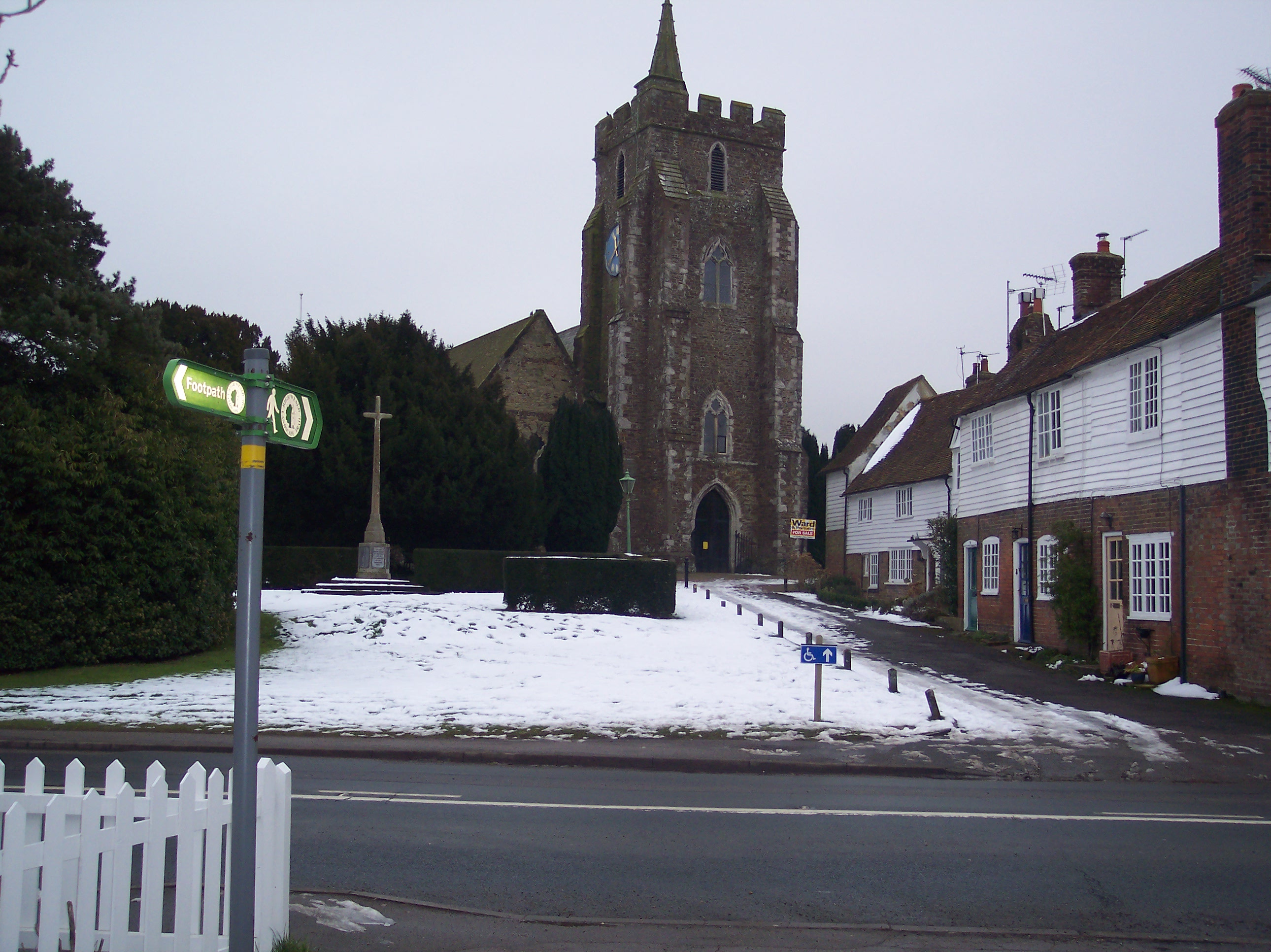
Rolvenden Church

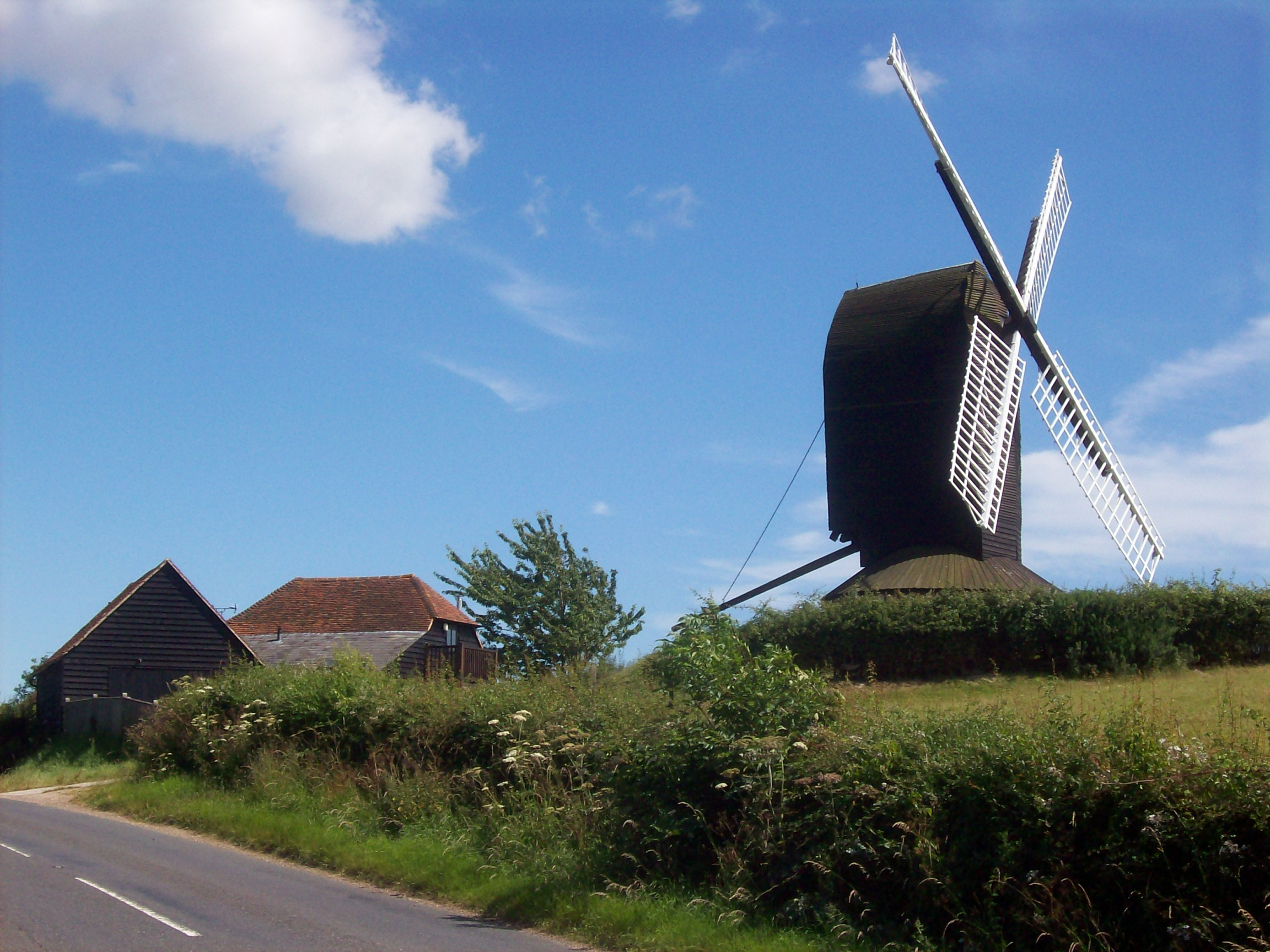
Rolvenden Windmill

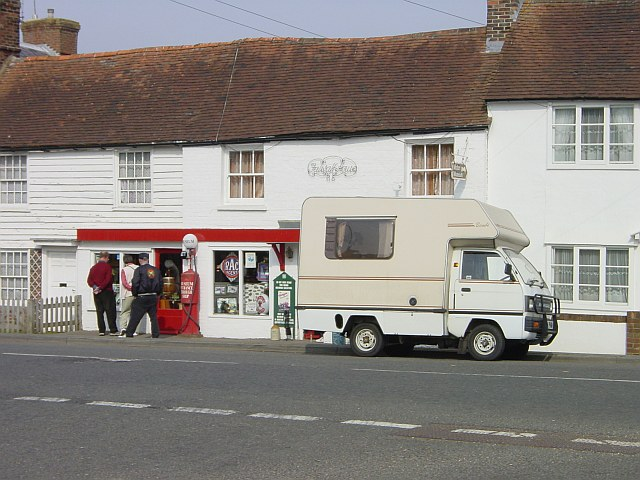
Historic motor vehicle collection

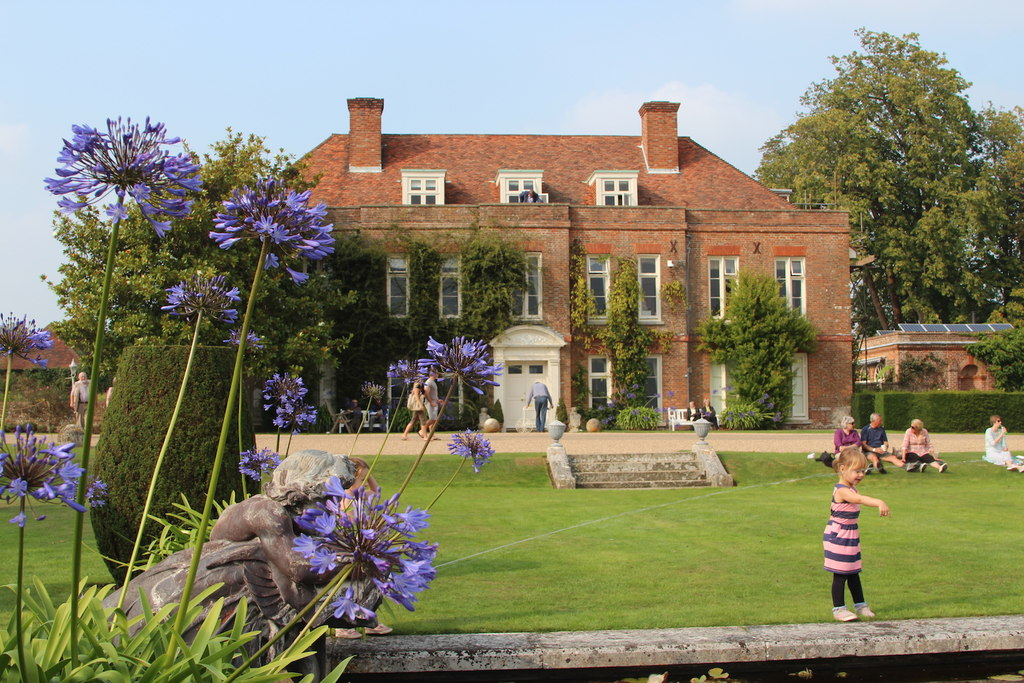
Hole Park

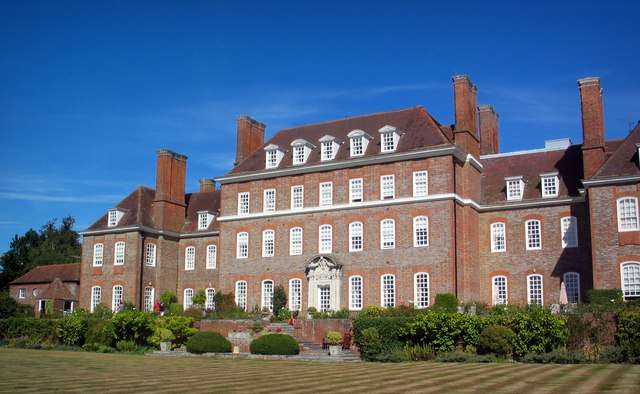
Great Maytham Hall as rebuilt by Lutyens

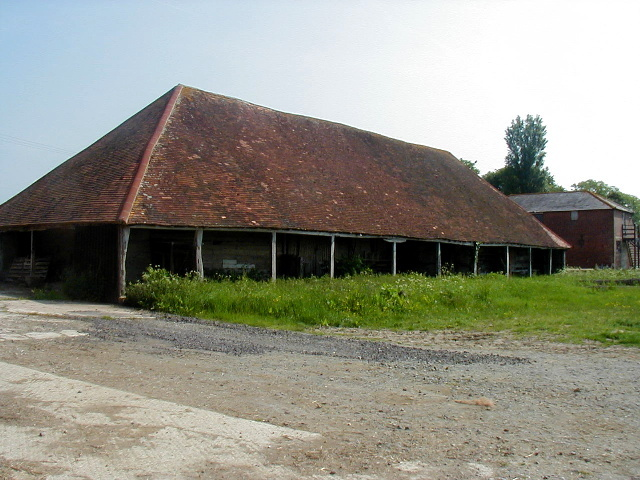
Barn at Lambsland Farm

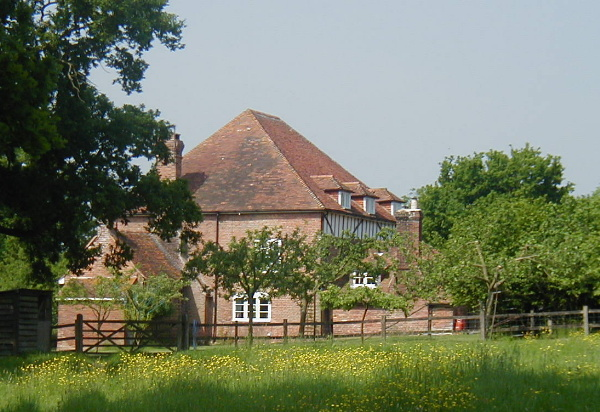
Forsham Farm near Rolvenden

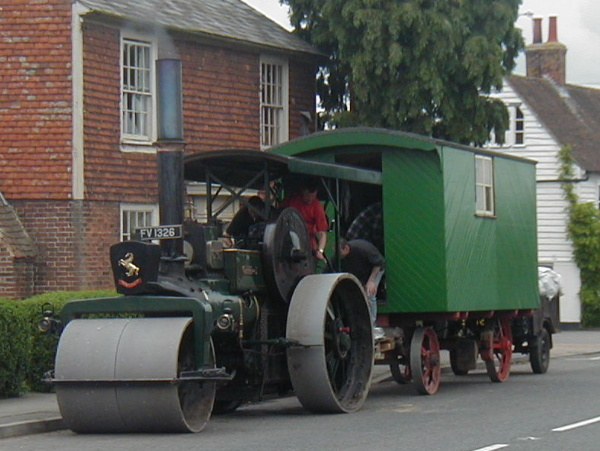
Steam roller at Rolvenden
