= Rolston =

Hamlet in the East Riding of Yorkshire, England

Coordinates: 53.889553°N 0.154904°W

- Location within the East Riding of Yorkshire
- OS grid reference: TA213452
- Civil parish: Mappleton
- Unitary authority: East Riding of Yorkshire
- Ceremonial county: East Riding of Yorkshire
- Region: Yorkshire and the Humber
- Country: England
- Sovereign state: United Kingdom
- Post town: HORNSEA
- Postcode district: HU18
- Dialling code: 01964
- Police: Humberside
- Fire: Humberside
- Ambulance: Yorkshire
- UK Parliament: Bridlington and The Wolds

Rolston is a hamlet in the East Riding of Yorkshire, England, in an area known as Holderness. It is situated approximately 2 miles (3.2 km) south of Hornsea and lies just west of the B1242 road.

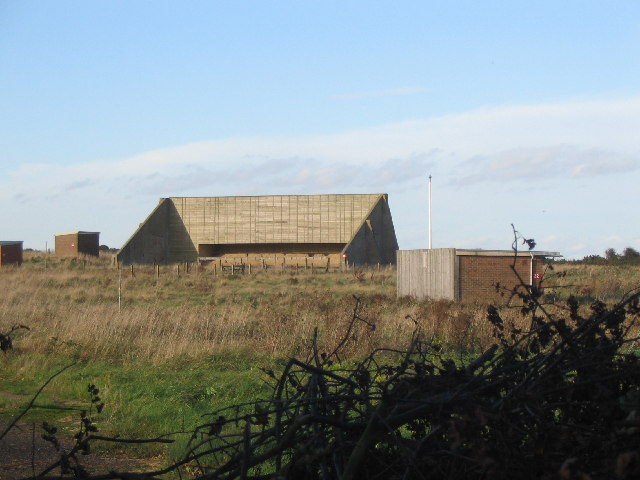
Rifle Range, near Rolston

It forms part of the civil parish of Mappleton.

The name Rolston derives from the Old Norse personal name Rolf and the Old English tūn meaning 'settlement'.
