= Rixon, Dorset =

Village in Dorset, England

Coordinates: 50.929°N 02.299°W

Rixon
- Location within Dorset
- OS grid reference: ST7914
- Unitary authority: Dorset
- Ceremonial county: Dorset
- Region: South West
- Country: England
- Sovereign state: United Kingdom
- Post town: Sturminster Newton
- Postcode district: DT10
- Dialling code: 01258
- Police: Dorset
- Fire: Dorset and Wiltshire
- Ambulance: South Western
- UK Parliament: North Dorset

Rixon is a village near Sturminster Newton in Dorset, England.

The village's transport links are currently provided by Damory Coaches, services 369 between Blandford Forum and Yeovil, and 309 between Blandford Forum and Shaftesbury.

== Etymology ==
The name Rixon was derived from the Old English word risc, "rushes", and survives as Rix and Rex in the dialects of Dorset, Somerset and Devon.
