= Roger Ground =

Hamlet in Cumbria, England

Coordinates: 54.368°N 3.001°W

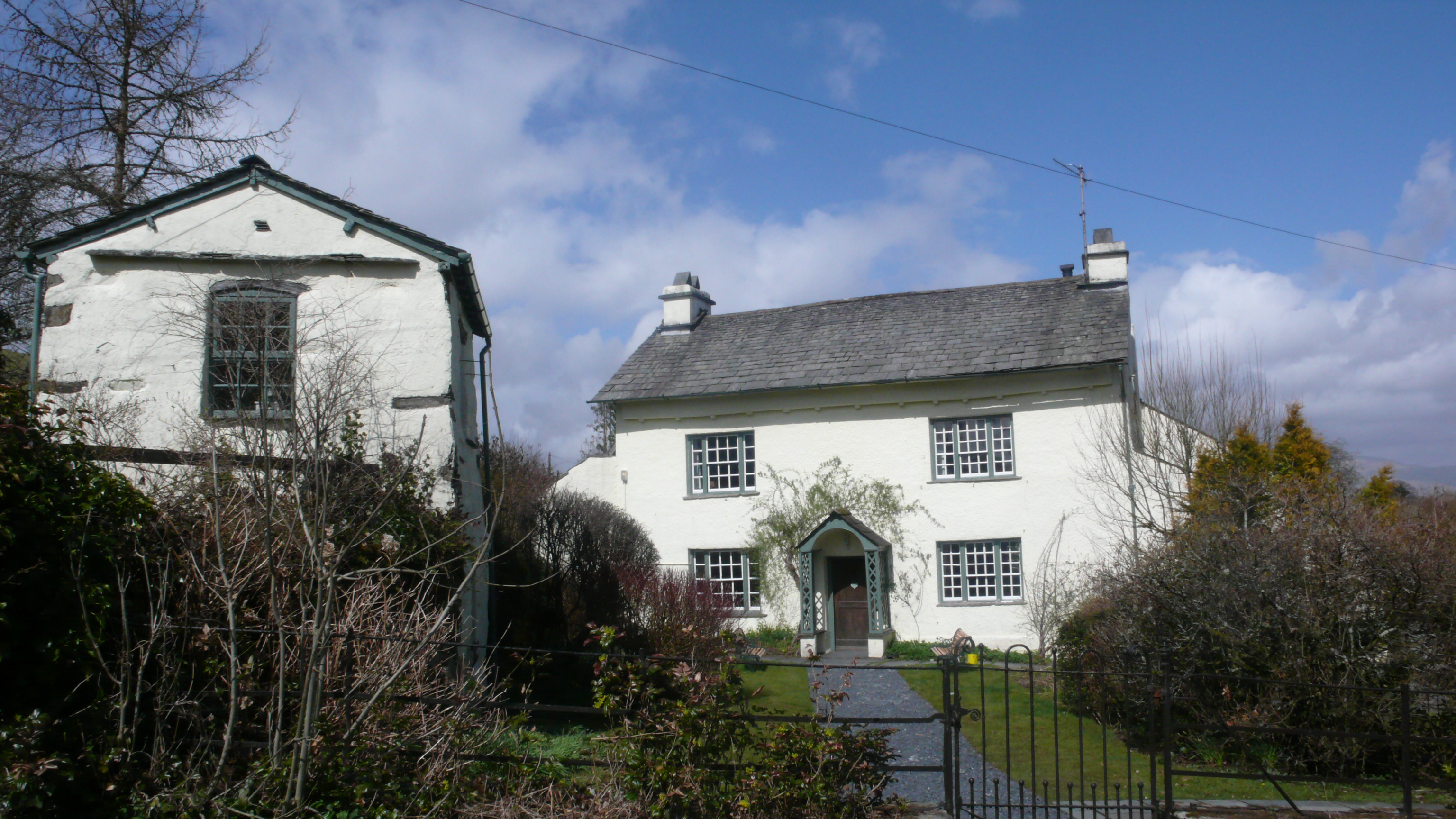

- Location in South Lakeland Location within Cumbria
- OS grid reference: NY349974
- Civil parish: Hawkshead
- Unitary authority: Westmorland and Furness
- Ceremonial county: Cumbria
- Region: North West
- Country: England
- Sovereign state: United Kingdom
- Post town: AMBLESIDE
- Postcode district: LA22
- Dialling code: 015394
- Police: Cumbria
- Fire: Cumbria
- Ambulance: North West
- UK Parliament: Westmorland and Lonsdale

Roger Ground is a hamlet in the civil parish of Hawkshead, in the Westmorland and Furness district, in the ceremonial county of Cumbria, England, south of the village of Hawkshead.
