= Roachill =

Hamlet in Devon, England

Coordinates: 50.993°N 3.643°W

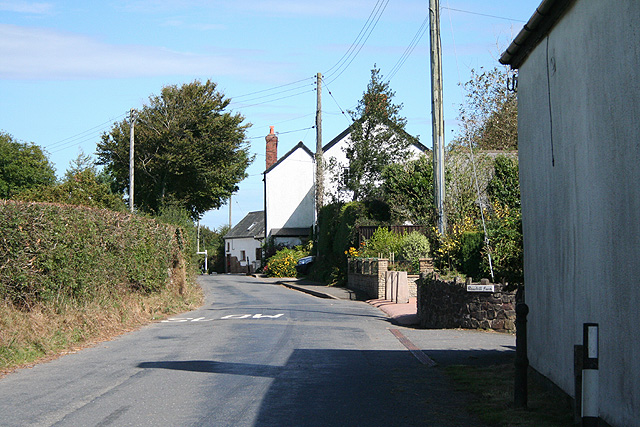
- Knowstone, Roachill

- Location within Devon
- OS grid reference: SS8548623560
- Civil parish: Knowstone
- District: North Devon
- Shire county: Devon
- Region: South West
- Country: England
- Sovereign state: United Kingdom
- Post town: TIVERTON
- Postcode district: EX16 9J
- Police: Devon and Cornwall
- Fire: Devon and Somerset
- Ambulance: South Western
- UK Parliament: North Devon

Roachill is a hamlet in the civil parish of Knowstone in the North Devon district of Devon, England. Its nearest town is Tiverton, which lies approximately 9.3 miles (15 km) south-west from the hamlet, just off the A361 road.
