= Great Maytham Hall =

English country house

Coordinates: 51°02′43″N 0°38′07″E

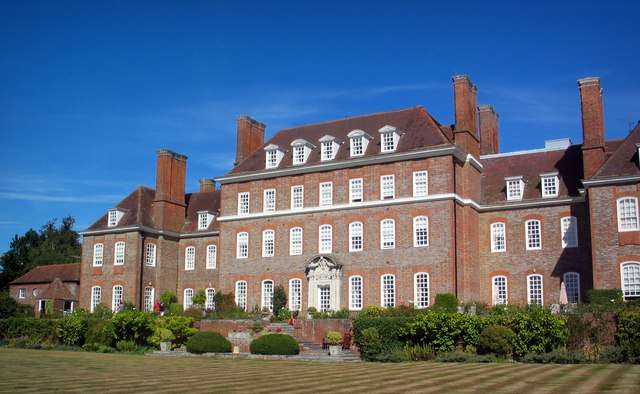
Great Maytham Hall

Great Maytham Hall, near Rolvenden, Kent, England, is a Grade II* listed country house. The gardens are famous for providing the inspiration for The Secret Garden by Frances Hodgson Burnett.

== House ==
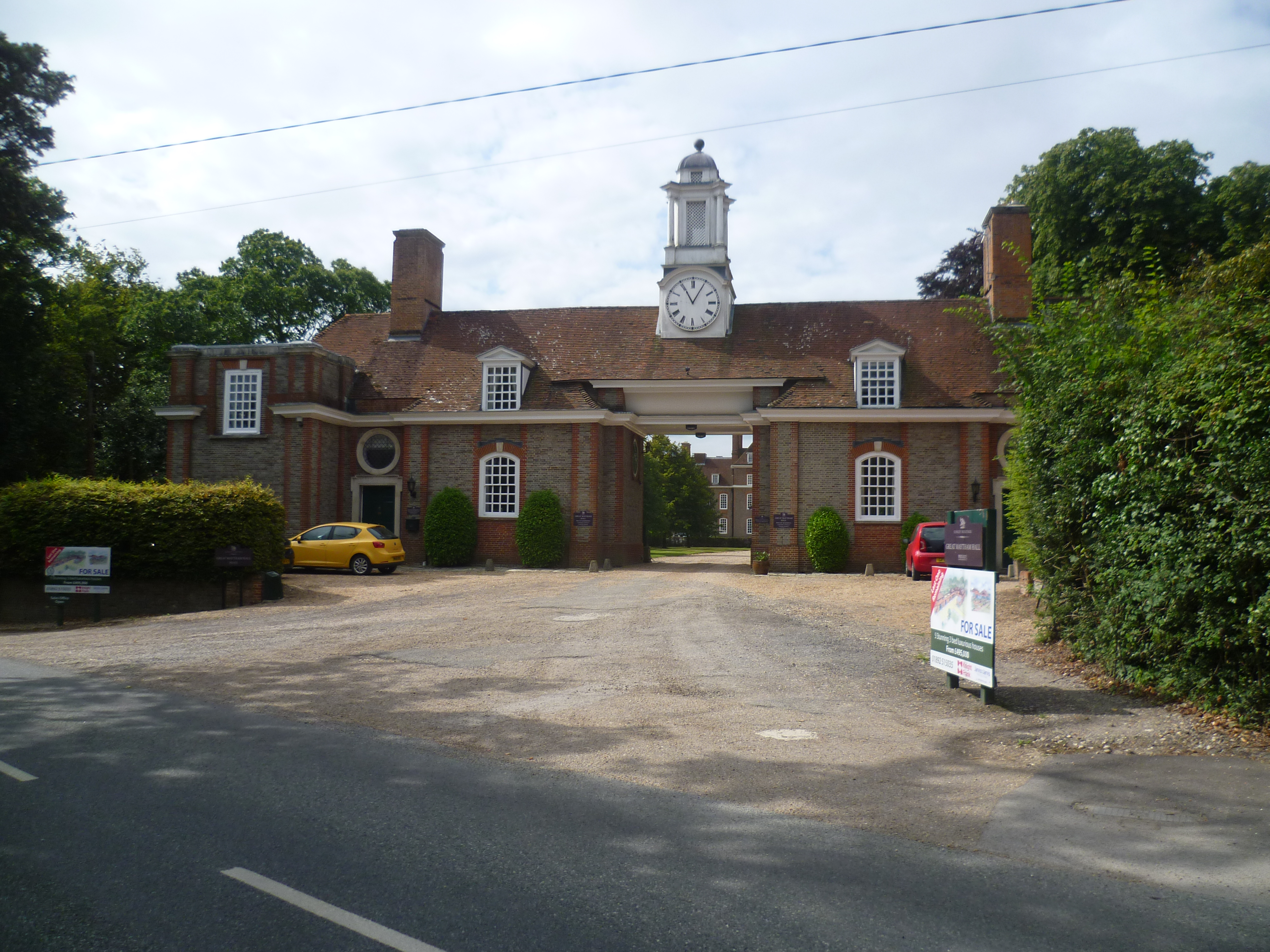
Gatehouse

The original name of the Manor here was Great Maytham. In 1721 James Monypenny built a house here which he called Maytham Hall. This was completed by his son Robert Monypenny in 1760 but was largely burned down in 1893. This house consisted of a main block of two storeys and basement and two pavilions containing the laundry and stables. These 18th-century wings largely survive, but the main building was rebuilt two storeys higher by Sir Edwin Lutyens in 1909–12 for The Right Honourable H. J. Tennant, a prominent Liberal Member of Parliament, who reverted to the use of the original name, Great Maytham.

The house briefly became the home of the Royal Normal College for the Blind after the college was advised to move from its London site at the outbreak of World War II. However, because of the threat of a German invasion, the authorities soon advised another move, and this time, with 24 hours' notice and the help of the London Society for the Blind, a temporary home was found for the college in Dorton, near Aylesbury, Buckinghamshire. The college's London campus was bombed during the Blitz and it is now located in Hereford.

The house and grounds fell into decline before World War II. In 1961 Great Maytham Hall was purchased and restored by the Mutual Households Association, later the Country Houses Association, a charity dedicated to saving and preserving historic stately home buildings by repurposing them from single household use. The house was converted into fifteen self-contained flats, with residents sharing reception rooms, entrance hall and drawing room; its first residents then set about restoring the gardens and grounds. In December 2003 the Country Houses Association announced that it was closing down its residential business and selling the eight Grade I and II listed buildings it still owned.

== Gardens ==
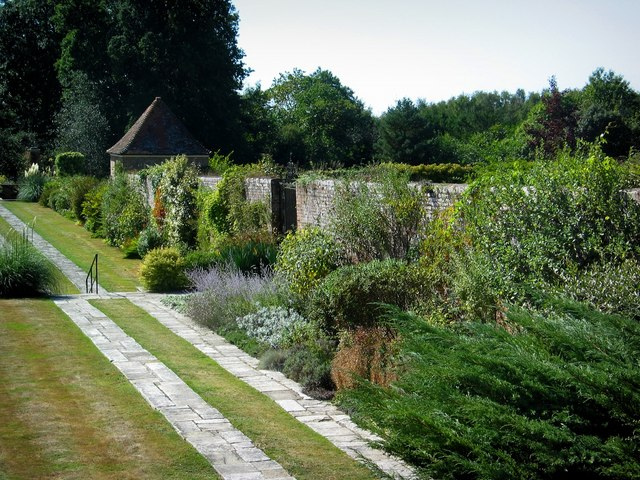
Great Maytham Hall Garden

The walled garden of Great Maytham Hall provided the inspiration for one of the most famous of all books for children, The Secret Garden. Its author, Frances Hodgson Burnett, lived at Great Maytham Hall from 1898 to 1907, where she found the old walled garden dating from 1721 overgrown and neglected. By her own account, aided by a robin, Burnett discovered the door hidden amongst the ivy, and began the restoration of the garden, which she planted with hundreds of roses. She set up a table and chair in the garden's gazebo, and wrote a number of books there, reportedly inspired by its peace and tranquility.

When Lutyens rebuilt Great Maytham Hall he retained the old walled garden as an adjunct to the grand new brick house in the manner of Sir Christopher Wren, but landscaped the terraced lawns and surrounding parkland in his signature style, in partnership with Gertrude Jekyll, who planted his design. The gardens and grounds were managed by the Tennant family until the outbreak of the Second World War, when the estate was requisitioned by the British army. As part of the "Dig for Victory" campaign, Frances Hodgson Burnett's roses were replaced with cabbages and leeks, and the manicured lawns were patriotically planted with potatoes and carrots. A jettisoned German bomb in the middle of the former lawn did not help to improve matters, and after the war the house stood empty for many years, and the gardens were left to decline.

== See also ==
- Rolvenden War Memorial, designed by Lutyens for Tennant, acting as chair of the war memorial committee.
