= Preston St Mary =

Village in Suffolk, England

Coordinates: 52.12°N 0.84°E

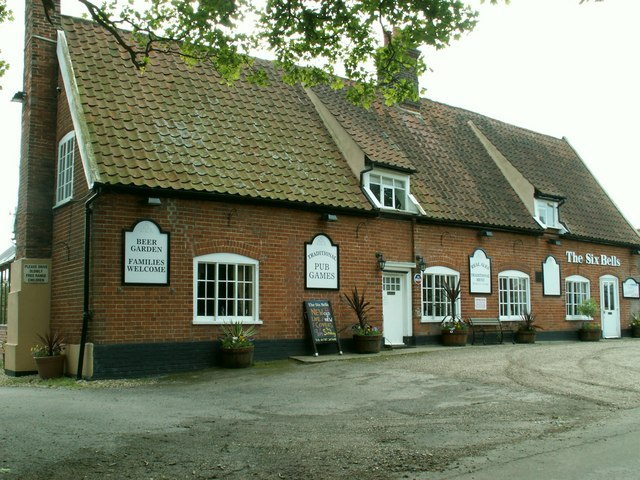
- 'The Six Bells' inn, Preston St. Mary

- Location within Suffolk
- Population: 177 (2011)
- District: Babergh
- Shire county: Suffolk
- Region: East
- Country: England
- Sovereign state: United Kingdom
- Post town: Sudbury
- Postcode district: CO10
- UK Parliament: South Suffolk

Preston St Mary is a village and civil parish in the Babergh district, in the county of Suffolk, England. Located to the north-east of Lavenham. The parish includes the hamlets of Rooksey Green and Whelp Street. In 2011 the parish had a population of 177.

The Church of St Mary dates from the 14th and 15th centuries but was rebuilt in 1868 after being struck by lightning in 1758. It is a grade I listed building.

Preston Hall is a 17th-century grade II* listed country house.

An episode of Time Team was filmed in the village in 1996.
