= List of Great Britain by-elections (1774–1790) =

This is a list of parliamentary by-elections in Great Britain held between 1774 and 1790, with the names of the previous incumbent and the victor in the by-election.

In the absence of a comprehensive and reliable source, for party and factional alignments in this period, no attempt is made to define them in this article. The House of Commons: 1754-1790 provides some guidance to the complex and shifting political relationships, but it is significant that the compilers of that work make no attempt to produce a definitive list of each members allegiances.

== Resignations ==
See Resignation from the British House of Commons for more details.

Where the cause of by-election is given as "resignation", this indicates that the incumbent was appointed on his own request to an "office of profit under the Crown". Offices used, in this period, were the Stewards of the Chiltern Hundreds, the Manor of Old Shorehamor the Manor of East Hendred. In addition in 1779 Jervoise Clarke Jervoise resigned by being appointed Agent to the Regiment of Militia in Sussex. Three other Members resigned in 1782 by being appointed an Agent to the Regiment of Militia. These appointments are made as a constitutional device for leaving the House of Commons, whose Members are not permitted to resign. If the vacancy was caused by appointment to another office then this office is noted in brackets.

In addition certain offices of profit, such as cabinet positions, required the MP to seek re-election. These offices are noted separately.

== By-elections ==
The c/u column denotes whether the by-election was a contested poll or an unopposed return. If the winner was re-elected, at the next general election and any intermediate by-elections, this is indicated by an * following the c or u. In a few cases the winner was elected at the next general election but had not been re-elected in a by-election after the one noted. In those cases no * symbol is used.

=== 14th Parliament (1774–1780) ===
Date	Constituency	c/u	Former Incumbent	Winner	Cause
24 December 1774	Wendover	u	John Adams	Henry Drummond	Chose to sit for Carmarthen
27 December 1774	Gatton	u*	Sir William Mayne	Robert Mayne	Chose to sit for Canterbury
27 December 1774	Gatton	u	Robert Scott	William Adam	Chose to sit for Wootton Bassett
27 December 1774	Midhurst	u	Herbert Mackworth	Henry Seymour Conway	Chose to sit for Cardiff Boroughs
27 December 1774	Midhurst	u*	Clement Tudway	John Ord	Chose to sit for Wells
28 December 1774	Cricklade	c(*)	William Earle	Samuel Peach	Death (Two MPs elected due to a Double Return)
28 December 1774	Cricklade	c(*)	William Earle	John Dewar	Death (Two MPs elected due to a Double Return)
28 December 1774	Winchester	u	Henry Penton	Henry Penton	Lord of the Admiralty
29 December 1774	Mitchell	u	James Scawen	Thomas Howard	Chose to sit for Surrey
30 December 1774	Great Bedwyn	u	The Earl of Courtown	Viscount Cranborne	Resignation
30 December 1774	Newport (Cornwall)	u	Humphry Morice	John Frederick	Chose to sit for Launceston
31 December 1774	Minehead	u	Henry Fownes Luttrell	Thomas Pownall	Resignation
2 January 1775	Castle Rising	u	Alexander Wedderburn	Charles Finch	Chose to sit for Okehampton
2 January 1775	East Looe	u	Charles Whitworth	Thomas Graves	Resignation to contest Saltash
3 January 1775	Saltash	u	Thomas Bradshaw	Charles Whitworth	Death
3 January 1775	Winchelsea	u	Arnold Nesbitt	William Nedham	Chose to sit for Cricklade
6 January 1775	Richmond	u	Thomas Dundas	Charles Dundas	Chose to sit for Stirlingshire
11 January 1775	Nottinghamshire	u*	Thomas Willoughby	Lord Charles Edward Bentinck	Succeeded to a peerage
12 January 1775	Leicestershire	c*	Thomas Noel	John Peach Hungerford	Succeeded to a peerage
30 January 1775	Cockermouth	u	George Johnstone	Ralph Gowland	Chose to sit for Appleby
30 January 1775	Cockermouth	u	Fletcher Norton	James Adair	Chose to sit for Carlisle
30 January 1775	Derby	c	Wenman Coke	John Gisborne	Chose to sit for Norfolk
30 January 1775	Derby	c	John Gisborne	Daniel Coke	By-election results reversed on petition 8 February 1776
2 February 1775	East Retford	u	Lord Thomas Pelham Clinton	William Hanger	Chose to sit for Westminster
4 February 1775	Derbyshire	u*	Godfrey Bagnall Clarke	Nathaniel Curzon	Death
6 February 1775	Yarmouth	u	Edward Meux Worsley	James Worsley	Resignation
7 February 1775	Plympton Erle	u	Paul Henry Ourry	John Durand	Resignation (Commissioner of the Navy)
20 February 1775	Wilton	u*	Nicholas Herbert	Charles Herbert	Death
28 February 1775	Malton	u*	Edmund Burke	William Weddell	Chose to sit for Bristol
4 March 1775	Cricklade	c	Samuel Peach	Samuel Peach	By-election Voided due to a Double Return
4 March 1775	Cricklade	c	John Dewar	Samuel Peach	By-election Voided due to a Double Return
4 March 1775	Cricklade	c	Samuel Peach	John Dewar	By-election results reversed on petition 19 February 1776
11 March 1775	Abingdon	u*	John Mayor	John Mayor	Void Election
13 March 1775	Boroughbridge	u	Charles Mellish	William Phillips	Chose to sit for Pontefract
15 March 1775	Wendover	u	Joseph Bullock	Thomas Dummer	Resignation
17 March 1775	Shrewsbury	u	The Lord Clive	John Corbet	Death
22 March 1775	Worcestershire	u*	William Dowdeswell	William Lygon	Death
27 March 1775	Bury St Edmunds	c*	Augustus John Hervey	Henry Seymour Conway	Succeeded to a peerage
5 April 1775	Heytesbury	u	William Gordon	William Gordon	Groom of the Bedchamber
12 April 1775	Scarborough	u	Sir Hugh Palliser	Sir Hugh Palliser	Naval Lord
19 April 1775	Knaresborough	u	Sir Anthony Abdy	Lord George Cavendish	Resignation
20 April 1775	Rye	u*	Middleton Onslow	Thomas Onslow	Resignation
24 April 1775	Newtown	u	Harcourt Powell	Charles Ambler	Resignation
16 May 1775	St Ives	u*	William Praed	Sir Thomas Wynn	Void Election
23 May 1775	Wigan	u	Beaumont Hotham	John Morton	Resignation (Baron of the Exchequer)
31 May 1775	Carlisle	u	Fletcher Norton	Walter Spencer Stanhope	Resignation
5 June 1775	East Looe	u*	Thomas Graves	William Graves	Resignation
7 June 1775	West Looe	u	Charles Ogilvie	John Rogers	Resignation
8 June 1775	Edinburghshire	u*	Henry Dundas	Henry Dundas	Lord Advocate
14 June 1775	Surrey	c*	Sir Francis Vincent	Sir Joseph Mawbey	Death
17 June 1775	Peeblesshire	u	Sir James William Montgomery	Adam Hay	Resignation (Chief Baron of the Scottish Exchequer)
30 October 1775	Ripon	u	Charles Allanson	William Lawrence	Death
3 November 1775	Hastings	u*	Charles Jenkinson	Charles Jenkinson	Clerk of the Pells in Ireland
8 November 1775	Malmesbury	u	Charles James Fox	Charles James Fox	Seeks re-election upon inheriting and then resigning the office of Clerk of the Pells in Ireland
15 November 1775	Cornwall	u*	Sir John Molesworth	Edward Eliot	Death
15 November 1775	East Grinstead	u*	Lord George Germain	Lord George Germain	Secretary of State for the Colonies
23 November 1775	St Germans	u	Edward Eliot	John Pownall	Resignation to contest Cornwall
24 November 1775	Bath	u	John Smith	Sir John Sebright	Death
28 November 1775	Essex	u	John Conyers	William Harvey	Death
29 November 1775	Eye	u	John St John	John St John	Surveyor General of the Land Revenues of the Crown
4 December 1775	Newtown	u*	Sir John Barrington	Edward Meux Worsley	Resignation
7 December 1775	Westmorland	u*	Sir James Lowther	James Lowther	Chose to sit for Cumberland
14 December 1775	Ilchester	c	Peregrine Cust	Nathaniel Webb	Void Election
14 December 1775	Ilchester	c	William Innes	Owen Salusbury Brereton	Void Election
14 December 1775	Peeblesshire	u	Adam Hay	Sir Robert Murray Keith	Death
16 December 1775	Stockbridge	c*	John Luttrell	James Luttrell	Resignation
19 December 1775	Richmond	u	Sir Lawrence Dundas	William Norton	Chose to sit for Edinburgh
1 January 1776	Hedon	c	Sir Charles Saunders	Lewis Thomas Watson	Death
17 January 1776	Ayr Burghs	u*	Sir George Macartney	Frederick Stuart	Resignation (Governor of Grenada)
24 January 1776	Fifeshire	c	John Scott	James Townsend Oswald	Death
31 January 1776	Huntingdon	u*	William Augustus Montagu	The Lord Mulgrave	Death
19 February 1776	Salisbury	u*	Viscount Folkestone	William Henry Bouverie	Succeeded to a peerage
21 February 1776	Berkshire	u*	Christopher Griffith	Winchcombe Henry Hartley	Death
11 March 1776	New Woodstock	u*	William Eden	William Eden	Lord of Trade
26 March 1776	Lancashire	u	Lord Stanley	Thomas Stanley	Succeeded to a peerage
8 April 1776	Tewkesbury	u*	Joseph Martin	James Martin	Death
6 May 1776	Gloucestershire	c*	Edward Southwell	William Bromley Chester	Succeeded to a peerage
8 May 1776	Norfolk	u*	Wenman Coke	Thomas William Coke	Death
16 May 1776	Hindon	c	Richard Smith	Richard Smith	Void Election
16 May 1776	Hindon	c	Thomas Brand Hollis	Henry Dawkins	Void Election
17 May 1776	Shaftesbury	c	Francis Sykes	George Rous	On Petition both incumbents were unseated and replaced by Hans Winthrop Mortimer. A by-election was held for the second seat.
17 May 1776	Shaftesbury	c	Sir Thomas Rumbold	George Rous	On Petition both incumbents were unseated and replaced by Hans Winthrop Mortimer. A by-election was held for the second seat.
18 May 1776	Portsmouth	u	Sir Edward Hawke	Maurice Suckling	Elevated to the peerage
20 May 1776	Bossiney	u*	Lord Mount Stuart	Charles Stuart	Elevated to the peerage
20 May 1776	Grantham	u	Sir Brownlow Cust	Peregrine Cust	Elevated to the peerage
20 May 1776	Tiverton	u*	Nathaniel Ryder	John Wilmot	Elevated to the peerage
22 May 1776	Herefordshire	c*	Thomas Foley	Thomas Harley	Elevated to the peerage
29 May 1776	Wareham	u	Christopher D'Oyly	Christopher D'Oyly	Commissary General of Musters
31 May 1776	St Germans	u	John Pownall	John Peachey	Resignation (Commissioner of Excise)
16 July 1776	Morpeth	u	William Byron	Gilbert Elliot	Death
3 September 1776	Devon	u	Sir Richard Bampfylde	John Rolle Walter	Death
27 September 1776	Leominster	u	Thomas Hill	Frederick Cornewall	Death
28 October 1776	Horsham	u	Jeremiah Dyson	The Earl of Drogheda	Death
4 November 1776	Camelford	u*	Francis Herne	Sir Ralph Payne	Death
4 November 1776	Haslemere	u	Thomas More Molyneux	Peter Burrell	Death
6 November 1776	Southampton	u	Hans Stanley	Hans Stanley	Cofferer of the Household
7 November 1776	Cambridge	c*	Charles Sloane Cadogan	Benjamin Keene	Succeeded to a peerage
9 November 1776	Exeter	c*	John Rolle Walter	John Baring	Resignation to contest Devon
25 November 1776	Sandwich	u	William Hey	Charles Brett	Resignation (Commissioner of Customs)
28 November 1776	Lostwithiel	u*	Charles Brett	Thomas Potter	Resignation to contest Sandwich
17 December 1776	Westminster	u	Earl Percy	Viscount Petersham	Succeeded to a peerage
5 February 1777	Hindon	c	Richard Smith	Archibald Macdonald	Void Election
20 February 1777	Morpeth	u	Sir Gilbert Elliot	John William Egerton	Resignation to contest Roxburghshire
27 February 1777	Newcastle-upon-Tyne	c	Walter Calverley-Blackett	John Trevelyan	Death
27 February 1777	Roxburghshire	u*	Sir Gilbert Elliot	Sir Gilbert Elliot	Death
4 March 1777	Aldborough	u	Charles Wilkinson	William Baker	Resignation
14 March 1777	Edinburghshire	u*	Henry Dundas	Henry Dundas	Joint Keeper of the Signet
27 March 1777	Lanarkshire	u*	Andrew Stuart	Andrew Stuart	Joint Keeper of the Signet
18 April 1777	Nairnshire	u	Cosmo Gordon	John Campbell	Resignation (Baron of the Exchequer in Scotland)
2 May 1777	Boston	u*	Charles Amcotts	Humphrey Sibthorp	Death
16 May 1777	Maidstone	c	Lord Guernsey	Charles Finch	Succeeded to a peerage
20 May 1777	Rye	u*	Rose Fuller	William Dickinson	Death
24 May 1777	Castle Rising	u*	Charles Finch	John Chetwynd Talbot	Resignation to contest Maidstone
29 May 1777	Haddingtonshire	u	Sir George Suttie	William Hamilton Nisbet	Resignation
11 June 1777	Lyme Regis	u	Henry Fane	Francis Fane	Death
11 June 1777	Great Yarmouth	c*	Charles Townshend	Charles Townshend	Vice-Treasurer of Ireland
13 June 1777	Tamworth	u	Thomas de Grey	Thomas de Grey	Lord of Trade
13 June 1777	Weymouth and Melcombe Regis	u*	Welbore Ellis	Welbore Ellis	Treasurer of the Navy
14 June 1777	Wilton	u	Charles Herbert	Charles Herbert	Groom of the Bedchamber
16 June 1777	Camelford	u	Sir Ralph Payne	Sir Ralph Payne	Third Clerk Comptroller of the Green Cloth
18 June 1777	Bewdley	u*	The Lord Westcote	The Lord Westcote	Junior Lord of the Treasury
26 June 1777	Flint Boroughs	u	Sir John Glynne	Watkin Williams	Death
4 July 1777	Montgomery	u*	Whitshed Keene	Whitshed Keene	Resignation
29 July 1777	Radnorshire	u	Chase Price	Thomas Johnes	Death
26 November 1777	Portsmouth	c*	Peter Taylor	William Gordon	Death
27 November 1777	Droitwich	u*	Thomas Foley	Edward Winnington	Succeeded to a peerage
29 November 1777	Bath	u*	Abel Moysey	Abel Moysey	Second Justice of Brecon Circuit
1 December 1777	Midhurst	u	John Ord	John Ord	Attorney-General of the Duchy of Lancaster
1 December 1777	New Woodstock	u*	John Skynner	Viscount Parker	Resignation (Chief Baron of the Exchequer)
10 December 1777	Dunwich	u*	Miles Barne	Barne Barne	Resignation
15 December 1777	Huntingdon	u*	The Lord Mulgrave	The Lord Mulgrave	Lord of the Admiralty
17 December 1777	Hastings	u*	The Viscount Palmerston	The Viscount Palmerston	Junior Lord of the Treasury
17 December 1777	Newport (I.o.W.)	u*	Sir Richard Worsley	Sir Richard Worsley	Third Clerk Comptroller of the Green Cloth
9 January 1778	Anstruther Burghs	u	Philip Anstruther	George Damer	Resignation
16 February 1778	Bridgnorth	u*	The Lord Pigot	Hugh Pigot	Death
24 February 1778	East Retford	u*	William Hanger	Lord John Pelham Clinton	Resignation to contest Aldborough
6 March 1778	Aldborough	u	Abel Smith	William Hanger	Resignation
23 April 1778	Brecon	u*	Charles Van	Charles Gould	Death
24 April 1778	Harwich	u*	Edward Harvey	George Augustus North	Death
27 May 1778	Lostwithiel	u	Thomas Potter	Thomas Potter	Second Justice of Anglesey
3 June 1778	St Germans	u	Benjamin Langlois	Benjamin Langlois	Storekeeper of the Ordnance
5 June 1778	Plymouth	u	The Viscount Barrington	Viscount Lewisham	Resignation
9 June 1778	Banbury	u*	Lord North	Lord North	Lord Warden of the Cinque Ports
10 June 1778	Horsham	u*	James Wallace	James Wallace	Solicitor General for England and Wales
10 June 1778	Tamworth	u	Edward Thurlow	Anthony Chamier	Appointed Lord Chancellor
10 June 1778	Weymouth and Melcombe Regis	u	John Tucker	Gabriel Steward	Resignation
11 June 1778	Okehampton	u	Alexander Wedderburn	Humphrey Minchin	Attorney General for England and Wales
15 June 1778	Bishop's Castle	u	Henry Strachey	Alexander Wedderburn	Clerk of the Deliveries of the Ordnance
10 August 1778	Portsmouth	u*	Maurice Suckling	Robert Monckton	Death
1 October 1778	Saltash	u	Charles Whitworth	Henry Strachey	Death
9 October 1778	Nottingham	u	Sir Charles Sedley	Abel Smith	Death
4 December 1778	Lymington	u	Sir Harry Burrard	Henry Goodricke	Resignation
5 December 1778	Callington	c*	John Dyke Acland	George Stratton	Death
9 December 1778	Nottinghamshire	u*	Earl of Lincoln	Charles Medows	Death
22 December 1778	Hastings	u	Charles Jenkinson	Charles Jenkinson	Secretary at War
26 December 1778	St Ives	u*	Adam Drummond	Philip Dehany	Resignation to contest Aberdeen Burghs
1 January 1779	Montgomery	u*	Whitshed Keene	Whitshed Keene	Surveyor of the King's Works
11 January 1779	Aberdeen Burghs	u*	Thomas Lyon	Adam Drummond	Resignation
26 January 1779	Newcastle-under-Lyme	u*	Sir George Hay	Viscount Trentham	Death
9 February 1779	Nottingham	u*	Abel Smith	Robert Smith	Death
27 February 1779	Scarborough	u*	Sir Hugh Palliser	Charles Phipps	Resignation
1 March 1779	Callington	c*	George Stratton	George Stratton	By-election results voided 15 February 1779
20 March 1779	Westbury	u*	Nathaniel Bayly	Samuel Estwick	Resignation
30 March 1779	Aldeburgh	u*	Thomas Fonnereau	Martyn Fonnereau	Death
31 March 1779	Bishop's Castle	u*	George Clive	William Clive	Death
8 April 1779	Plympton Erle	u	The Lord Milford	William Fullarton	Resignation
15 April 1779	Berwickshire	u	Sir James Pringle	Sir John Paterson	Resignation
20 April 1779	Westminster	u	Viscount Petersham	Viscount Malden	Succeeded to a peerage
29 April 1779	Cricklade	u*	Arnold Nesbitt	John Macpherson	Death
29 April 1779	Elginshire	u*	Arthur Duff	Lord William Gordon	Resignation
11 May 1779	Essex	u*	William Harvey	Thomas Berney Bramston	Death
10 June 1779	Cambridge University	c*	Marquess of Granby	James Mansfield	Succeeded to a peerage
15 June 1779	Christchurch	u	Lord Hyde	Lord Hyde	Resignation to contest Cambridge University
2 July 1779	Fifeshire	c(*)	James Townsend Oswald	Robert Skene	Resignation (Auditor of the Exchequer in Scotland)
2 July 1779	Fifeshire	c(*)	Robert Skene	John Henderson	By-election results reversed on petition 7 February 1780
12 July 1779	Liskeard	u	Edward Gibbon	Edward Gibbon	Lord of Trade
12 July 1779	Truro	u*	Bamber Gascoyne	Bamber Gascoyne	Lord of the Admiralty
16 July 1779	Edinburghshire	u*	Henry Dundas	Henry Dundas	Keeper of the Signet
16 July 1779	Linlithgowshire	u*	Sir William Cunynghame	Sir William Cunynghame	Third Clerk Comptroller of the Green Cloth
23 July 1779	Lanarkshire	u*	Andrew Stuart	Andrew Stuart	Lord of Trade
2 September 1779	Carmarthenshire	u*	George Rice	John Vaughan	Death
8 September 1779	Downton	u	John Cooper	Thomas Duncombe	Death
22 September 1779	Mitchell	u*	Thomas Howard	Francis Hale	Succeeded to a peerage
25 October 1779	Buckinghamshire	u*	George Grenville	Thomas Grenville	Succeeded to a peerage
28 October 1779	Middlesex	u	John Glynn	Thomas Wood	Death
13 December 1779	Hampshire	c*	Sir Simeon Stuart	Jervoise Clarke Jervoise	Death
15 December 1779	Lincolnshire	u*	Lord Brownlow Bertie	Sir John Thorold	Succeeded to a peerage
16 December 1779	Yarmouth	u	Jervoise Clarke Jervoise	Robert Kingsmill	Resignation to contest Hampshire
17 December 1779	Downton	c(*)	Thomas Duncombe	Bartholomew Bouverie	Death
17 December 1779	Downton	c(*)	Bartholomew Bouverie	Robert Shafto	By-election results reversed on petition 21 February 1780
22 December 1779	Oxfordshire	u*	Lord Charles Spencer	Lord Charles Spencer	Treasurer of the Chamber
4 January 1780	Devon	u*	John Rolle Walter	John Rolle	Death
29 January 1780	Southampton	u	Hans Stanley	John Fuller	Death
1 February 1780	Newport (I.o.W.)	u*	Sir Richard Worsley	Sir Richard Worsley	Comptroller of the Household
5 February 1780	Orford	u*	Viscount Beauchamp	Viscount Beauchamp	Cofferer of the Household
15 February 1780	Coventry	u	Walter Waring	John Baker Holroyd	Death
22 February 1780	Lancashire	u*	Thomas Stanley	Thomas Stanley	Death
23 February 1780	Haddington Burghs	u*	John Maitland	Francis Charteris	Death
1 March 1780	Cheshire	u*	Samuel Egerton	Sir Robert Salusbury Cotton	Death
31 March 1780	Weobley	u*	William Lynch	Andrew Bayntun Rolt	Resignation
27 May 1780	Maldon	u*	Richard Savage Nassau	Eliab Harvey	Death
31 May 1780	Plymouth	c*	Sir Charles Hardy	Sir Frederick Lehman Rogers	Death
12 June 1780	Cardigan Boroughs	u*	Thomas Johnes	John Campbell	Resignation to contest Radnorshire
26 June 1780	Bishop's Castle	u*	Alexander Wedderburn	Henry Strachey	Resignation (Chief Justice of the Common Pleas)
12 July 1780	Horsham	u*	James Wallace	James Wallace	Attorney General for England and Wales
12 July 1780	Saltash	u	Henry Strachey	Paul Wentworth	Resignation to contest Bishop's Castle
26 July 1780	Radnorshire	u*	Thomas Johnes	Thomas Johnes	Death
21 August 1780	Wigan	u*	John Morton	Henry Simpson Bridgeman	Death

=== 15th Parliament (1780–1784) ===
Date	Constituency	c/u	Former Incumbent	Winner	Cause
27 November 1780	Tamworth	u*	Anthony Chamier	John Calvert	Death
28 November 1780	Aldborough	u	Sir Richard Sutton	Edward Onslow	Chose to sit for Sandwich
28 November 1780	Devizes	u	Charles Garth	Henry Jones	Resignation (Commissioner of Excise)
28 November 1780	Huntingdon	u	Sir George Wombwell	Sir Hugh Palliser	Death
28 November 1780	Launceston	u*	Viscount Cranborne	Charles George Perceval	Succeeded to a peerage
28 November 1780	City of London	u*	John Kirkman	John Sawbridge	Death
28 November 1780	Malmesbury	u	Viscount Lewisham	John Calvert	Chose to sit for Staffordshire
28 November 1780	Steyning	u	Filmer Honywood	John Bullock	Chose to sit for Kent
29 November 1780	Midhurst	u	John St John	Sir Sampson Gideon	Chose to sit for Newport (I.o.W.)
30 November 1780	Horsham	u	Viscount Lewisham	Sir George Osborn	Chose to sit for Staffordshire
30 November 1780	Plympton Erle	u	Viscount Cranborne	James Archibald Stuart	Succeeded to a peerage
30 November 1780	Weymouth and Melcombe Regis	u*	Warren Lisle	Gabriel Steward	Resignation
1 December 1780	Lostwithiel	u	John St John	George Johnstone	Chose to sit for Newport (I.o.W.)
2 December 1780	Bere Alston	u*	Lord Algernon Percy	Viscount Feilding	Chose to sit for Northumberland
4 December 1780	Heytesbury	u	William Eden	Francis Nathaniel Burton	Chose to sit for New Woodstock
4 December 1780	Seaford	c	John Robinson	Christopher D'Oyly	Chose to sit for Harwich
7 December 1780	Malton	u*	Savile Finch	Edmund Burke	Resignation to provide a seat for Burke
9 December 1780	Northallerton	u*	Daniel Lascelles	Edwin Lascelles	Resignation
9 December 1780	Wenlock	u	Thomas Whitmore	George Forester	Chose to sit for Bridgnorth
12 December 1780	Haslemere	u	Sir James Lowther	Walter Spencer Stanhope	Chose to sit for Cumberland
12 December 1780	Lyme Regis	c*	Henry Fane	Henry Fane	Election voided due to a Double Return
12 December 1780	Lyme Regis	c	Lionel Darell	Henry Fane	Election voided due to a Double Return
12 December 1780	Lyme Regis	c	David Robert Michel	David Robert Michel	Election voided due to a Double Return
12 December 1780	Lyme Regis	c	Henry Harford	David Robert Michel	Election voided due to a Double Return
8 January 1781	Appleby	u*	William Lowther	William Pitt the Younger	Chose to sit for Carlisle
24 January 1781	Gloucestershire	u	William Bromley Chester	James Dutton	Death
29 January 1781	Christchurch	u*	James Harris	John Frederick	Death
14 February 1781	Bere Alston	u	The Lord Macartney	Laurence Cox	Resignation
26 February 1781	Bristol	c	Sir Henry Lippincott	George Daubeny	Death
3 March 1781	Great Bedwyn	u	Paul Methuen	Paul Cobb Methuen	Resignation
12 March 1781	Helston	u	Jocelyn Deane	Richard Barwell	Death
26 March 1781	Arundel	u	Sir Patrick Crauford	Peter William Baker	Void Election
5 April 1781	Honiton	c	Alexander Macleod	Jacob Wilkinson	Void Election
6 April 1781	Kirkcudbrightshire	c(*)	Peter Johnston	John Gordon	Void Election
6 April 1781	Kirkcudbrightshire	c(*)	John Gordon	Peter Johnston	By-election results reversed on petition 6 February 1782
9 April 1781	Richmond	u	Sir Lawrence Dundas	George Fitzwilliam	Chose to sit for Edinburgh
12 April 1781	Berwickshire	u	Hugh Scott	Hugh Scott	Void Election
14 April 1781	Yarmouth	u	Edward Rushworth	Sir Thomas Rumbold	Resignation
30 April 1781	Weymouth and Melcombe Regis	u	William Chaffin Grove	William Richard Rumbold	Resignation
4 June 1781	Lostwithiel	u	Thomas de Grey	Viscount Malden	Succeeded to a peerage
5 June 1781	Ripon	u*	William Aislabie	William Lawrence	Death
8 June 1781	Aldborough	u	Edward Onslow	Sir Samuel Fludyer	Resignation
25 June 1781	Lymington	u	Thomas Dummer	Edward Gibbon	Death
26 June 1781	Radnorshire	u*	Thomas Johnes	Thomas Johnes	Auditor of the King's Land Revenue in Wales
30 June 1781	Helston	c*	Philip Yorke	Lord Hyde	Resignation
3 July 1781	Knaresborough	u*	Robert Walsingham	James Hare	Death
16 July 1781	Caernarvon Boroughs	u*	Glyn Wynn	Glyn Wynn	Receiver General of Land Revenue in North Wales and Cheshire
26 July 1781	Morpeth	u	Anthony Morris Storer	Anthony Morris Storer	Lord of Trade
16 August 1781	Ayrshire	u	Sir Adam Fergusson	Sir Adam Fergusson	Lord of Trade
24 August 1781	Lanarkshire	u	Andrew Stuart	Andrew Stuart	Seeks re-election upon becoming Keeper of the Register of Sasines in Scotland
3 September 1781	Heytesbury	u	William Ashe-à Court	William Pierce Ashe à Court	Death
2 October 1781	City of London	c*	George Hayley	Sir Watkin Lewes	Death
17 October 1781	Colchester	c*	Isaac Martin Rebow	Christopher Potter	Death
17 October 1781	Colchester	c*	Christopher Potter	Edmund Affleck	By-election results reversed on petition 4 March 1782
29 October 1781	Edinburgh	u*	Sir Lawrence Dundas	James Hunter Blair	Death
29 November 1781	Derbyshire	u*	Lord Richard Cavendish	Lord George Cavendish	Death
4 December 1781	Milborne Port	u*	Thomas Hutchings Medlycott	John Pennington	Resignation
17 December 1781	East Retford	u*	Lord John Pelham Clinton	Earl of Lincoln	Death
2 January 1782	Castle Rising	u	John Chetwynd Talbot	John Chetwynd Talbot	Lord of Trade
2 February 1782	Bramber	u	Thomas Thoroton	Henry Fitzroy Stanhope	Resignation (Agent to the Regiment of Militia in Leicestershire)
11 February 1782	Forfarshire	c*	The Earl Panmure	Archibald Douglas	Death
18 February 1782	Weymouth and Melcombe Regis	u*	Welbore Ellis	Welbore Ellis	Secretary of State for the Colonies
19 February 1782	Buckingham	u*	Richard Aldworth Neville	William Wyndham Grenville	Agent to the Regiment of Militia in Buckinghamshire
19 February 1782	East Grinstead	u*	Lord George Germain	Henry Arthur Herbert	Elevated to the peerage
21 February 1782	Reading	c*	John Dodd	Richard Aldworth Neville	Death
11 March 1782	Chichester	c	William Keppel	Percy Charles Wyndham	Death
20 March 1782	West Looe	u	John Buller	John Somers Cocks	Resignation
20 March 1782	Taunton	c*	John Roberts	Benjamin Hammet	Death
23 March 1782	Boston	u*	Lord Robert Bertie	Sir Peter Burrell	Death
28 March 1782	Inverness-shire	u	Simon Fraser	Archibald Campbell Fraser	Death
2 April 1782	Honiton	u*	Sir George Yonge	Sir George Yonge	Vice-Treasurer of Ireland
3 April 1782	Cambridge University	u*	John Townshend	John Townshend	Lord of the Admiralty
3 April 1782	Eye	u	Arnoldus Jones Skelton	William Cornwallis	Resignation
3 April 1782	Northampton	u	Viscount Althorp	Viscount Althorp	Junior Lord of the Treasury
3 April 1782	Westminster	u*	Charles James Fox	Charles James Fox	Foreign Secretary
3 April 1782	Whitchurch	u*	Thomas Townshend	Thomas Townshend	Secretary at War
3 April 1782	York	u*	Lord John Cavendish	Lord John Cavendish	Chancellor of the Exchequer
4 April 1782	Bridgnorth	u	Hugh Pigot	Hugh Pigot	Naval Lord
4 April 1782	Buckingham	u*	James Grenville	James Grenville	Junior Lord of the Treasury
4 April 1782	Guildford	u	Sir Fletcher Norton	William Norton	Elevated to the peerage
4 April 1782	Higham Ferrers	u*	Frederick Montagu	Frederick Montagu	Junior Lord of the Treasury
4 April 1782	Knaresborough	u*	Viscount Duncannon	Viscount Duncannon	Lord of the Admiralty
4 April 1782	Malton	u*	Edmund Burke	Edmund Burke	Paymaster of the Forces
5 April 1782	Calne	u*	Isaac Barré	Isaac Barré	Treasurer of the Navy
5 April 1782	Calne	u*	John Dunning	James Townsend	Chancellor of the Duchy of Lancaster and Elevation to the peerage
6 April 1782	Thetford	u	Charles Fitzroy Scudamore	Earl of Euston	Resignation
6 April 1782	Thetford	u	Richard Hopkins	Richard Hopkins	Lord of the Admiralty
10 April 1782	Surrey	u	Augustus Keppel	Viscount Althorp	First Lord of the Admiralty and elevation to the peerage
16 April 1782	Dartmouth	u*	The Viscount Howe	Charles Brett	Became a British Peer
20 April 1782	Clitheroe	u*	John Parker	John Lee	Resignation to provide a seat for Lee
22 April 1782	Hindon	c*	Lloyd Kenyon	Lloyd Kenyon	Attorney General for England and Wales
25 April 1782	Elginshire	u	Lord William Gordon	Lord William Gordon	Vice Admiral of Scotland
25 April 1782	Sussex	u*	Thomas Pelham	Thomas Pelham	Surveyor-General of the Ordnance
26 April 1782	Northampton	u	Viscount Althorp	The Lord Lucan	Resignation to contest Surrey
4 May 1782	Huntingdonshire	u*	The Earl Ludlow	The Earl Ludlow	Comptroller of the Household
25 May 1782	Castle Rising	u	John Chetwynd Talbot	Sir James Erskine	Succeeded to a peerage
3 June 1782	Oxford	u*	Lord Robert Spencer	Lord Robert Spencer	Vice-Treasurer of Ireland
5 June 1782	Portsmouth	u*	Robert Monckton	Sir Henry Fetherstonhaugh	Death
6 June 1782	Kingston upon Hull	u	Lord Robert Manners	David Hartley	Death
12 June 1782	Cricklade	c	John Macpherson	George St John	Void Election
12 June 1782	Westminster	u	Sir George Brydges Rodney	Sir Cecil Wray	Elevated to the peerage
20 June 1782	Cambridgeshire	u*	Lord Robert Manners	Sir Henry Peyton	Death
8 July 1782	New Romney	u	Richard Jackson	Richard Jackson	Junior Lord of the Treasury
15 July 1782	Wallingford	u*	John Aubrey	John Aubrey	Lord of the Admiralty
16 July 1782	Honiton	u*	Sir George Yonge	Sir George Yonge	Secretary at War
18 July 1782	Whitchurch	u	Thomas Townshend	Thomas Townshend	Home Secretary
19 July 1782	Bath	u*	John Jeffreys Pratt	John Jeffreys Pratt	Lord of the Admiralty
19 July 1782	Calne	u*	Isaac Barré	Isaac Barré	Paymaster of the Forces
22 July 1782	St Germans	u*	Edward James Eliot	Edward James Eliot	Junior Lord of the Treasury
5 August 1782	Appleby	u*	William Pitt the Younger	William Pitt the Younger	Chancellor of the Exchequer
31 August 1782	Wells	c	Robert Child	John Curtis	Death
7 September 1782	Wigan	u*	Henry Simpson Bridgeman	John Cotes	Death
9 September 1782	Gatton	u*	Robert Mayne	Maurice Lloyd	Death
16 September 1782	Newtown	u	Edward Meux Worsley	Henry Dundas	Death
24 September 1782	Southwark	c*	Nathaniel Polhill	Henry Thornton	Death
13 December 1782	Penryn	u	John Rogers	Reginald Pole Carew	Resignation (Agent to the Regiment of Militia in Somerset)
18 December 1782	Oxfordshire	u*	Lord Charles Spencer	Lord Charles Spencer	Vice-Treasurer of Ireland
21 December 1782	Abingdon	u	John Mayor	Henry Howorth	Resignation
2 January 1783	Edinburghshire	u*	Henry Dundas	Henry Dundas	Treasurer of the Navy
17 January 1783	Newtown	u*	Henry Dundas	Richard Pepper Arden	Resignation to contest Edinburghshire
18 January 1783	Coventry	u	Edward Roe Yeo	William Seymour Conway	Death
21 January 1783	Anstruther Burghs	u*	Sir John Anstruther	John Anstruther	Resignation
27 January 1783	Lincoln	u*	Sir Thomas Clarges	John Fenton Cawthorne	Death
28 January 1783	Newark-on-Trent	u*	Lord George Manners Sutton	John Manners Sutton	Death
31 January 1783	Launceston	u	Thomas Bowlby	Sir John Jervis	Resignation
17 February 1783	Pontefract	c(*)	The Viscount Galway	Nathaniel Smith	Resignation
17 February 1783	Pontefract	c(*)	Nathaniel Smith	John Smyth	By-election results reversed 11 April 1783
28 February 1783	Chippenham	u*	Giles Hudson	George Fludyer	Death
11 March 1783	Minehead	u*	Francis Fownes Luttrell	Henry Beaufoy	Resignation
17 March 1783	Whitchurch	u*	Thomas Townshend	William Selwyn	Elevated to the peerage
20 March 1783	Peeblesshire	u	Alexander Murray	Alexander Murray	Resignation (Lord of Session)
29 March 1783	Westbury	u*	Samuel Estwick	Samuel Estwick	Secretary and Registrar of Chelsea Hospital
7 April 1783	Westminster	u*	Charles James Fox	Charles James Fox	Foreign Secretary
8 April 1783	York	u	Lord John Cavendish	Lord John Cavendish	Chancellor of the Exchequer
9 April 1783	Banbury	u*	Lord North	Lord North	Home Secretary
9 April 1783	New Woodstock	u	William Eden	William Eden	Vice-Treasurer of Ireland
9 April 1783	Great Yarmouth	u	Charles Townshend	Charles Townshend	Treasurer of the Navy
10 April 1783	Higham Ferrers	u*	Frederick Montagu	Frederick Montagu	Junior Lord of the Treasury
11 April 1783	Cambridge University	u	John Townshend	John Townshend	Lord of the Admiralty
11 April 1783	Malton	u*	Edmund Burke	Edmund Burke	Paymaster of the Forces
12 April 1783	Saltash	c	Sir Grey Cooper	Sir Grey Cooper	Junior Lord of the Treasury
14 April 1783	Carlisle	u*	Earl of Surrey	Earl of Surrey	Junior Lord of the Treasury
15 April 1783	Knaresborough	u*	Viscount Duncannon	Viscount Duncannon	Lord of the Admiralty
15 April 1783	Warwick	u*	Charles Francis Greville	Charles Francis Greville	Treasurer of the Household
16 April 1783	Petersfield	u*	William Jolliffe	William Jolliffe	Lord of the Admiralty
16 April 1783	Montgomery	u	Whitshed Keene	Whitshed Keene	Lord of the Admiralty
17 April 1783	Bishop's Castle	u*	Henry Strachey	Henry Strachey	Clerk of the Deliveries of the Ordnance
18 April 1783	Tavistock	u*	Richard FitzPatrick	Richard FitzPatrick	Secretary at War
22 April 1783	Horsham	u	James Wallace	James Wallace	Attorney General for England and Wales
23 April 1783	Clitheroe	u*	John Lee	John Lee	Solicitor General for England and Wales
25 April 1783	Okehampton	u(*)	Humphrey Minchin	Humphrey Minchin	Clerk of the Ordnance
28 April 1783	Gloucestershire	u*	Sir William Guise	George Cranfield Berkeley	Death
29 April 1783	Tamworth	u*	John Courtenay	John Courtenay	Surveyor-General of the Ordnance
2 May 1783	Wigan	u	Horatio Walpole	Horatio Walpole	Secretary and Registrar of Chelsea Hospital
3 May 1783	East Grinstead	u*	John Irwin	George Medley	Resignation
9 May 1783	Ludlow	u	Frederick Cornewall	Somerset Davies	Death
9 May 1783	Wigtown Burghs	u	William Adam	William Adam	Treasurer of the Ordnance
19 May 1783	Abingdon	u*	Henry Howorth	Edward Loveden Loveden	Death
24 May 1783	Huntingdonshire	u*	Viscount Hinchingbrooke	Viscount Hinchingbrooke	Master of the Buckhounds
30 May 1783	Newton	u*	Thomas Peter Legh	Thomas Peter Legh	Accepted a Commission in the Army
16 June 1783	Weobley	u*	John St Leger Douglas	John Scott	Death
8 July 1783	Truro	u	Henry Rosewarne	John Pollexfen Bastard	Death
12 July 1783	Great Marlow	u*	William Clayton	William Clayton	Death
15 July 1783	Cirencester	u*	James Whitshed	Lord Apsley	Resignation
28 July 1783	Portsmouth	u*	William Gordon	Thomas Erskine	Resignation (Granted a Pension)
7 August 1783	Dunbartonshire	u*	George Keith Elphinstone	George Keith Elphinstone	Secretary, Chamberlain and Keeper of the Signet of the Principality of Scotland
21 August 1783	Renfrewshire	u*	John Shaw Stewart	William McDowall	Resignation
17 October 1783	Winchester	u	Lovell Stanhope	Henry Flood	Death
17 November 1783	York	u*	Sir Charles Turner	The Viscount Galway	Death
19 November 1783	Surrey	u	Viscount Althorp	Sir Robert Clayton	Succeeded to a peerage
23 November 1783	Bletchingley	u*	Sir Robert Clayton	Sir John Nicholls	Resignation to contest Surrey
26 November 1783	Cambridge University	u	James Mansfield	James Mansfield	Solicitor General for England and Wales
26 November 1783	Clitheroe	u*	John Lee	John Lee	Attorney General for England and Wales
28 November 1783	Horsham	u	James Wallace	James Craufurd	Death
1 December 1783	East Looe	u	William Graves	John James Hamilton	Resignation
15 December 1783	Hedon	u	Christopher Atkinson	Stephen Lushington	Expulsion for perjury
29 December 1783	St Albans	u	John Radcliffe	The Viscount Grimston	Death
30 December 1783	Honiton	u*	Sir George Yonge	Sir George Yonge	Secretary at War
30 December 1783	Wallingford	u	John Aubrey	John Aubrey	Junior Lord of the Treasury
31 December 1783	Cirencester	u*	Lord Apsley	Lord Apsley	Lord of the Admiralty
31 December 1783	Dartmouth	u	Charles Brett	Charles Brett	Lord of the Admiralty
31 December 1783	Hindon	c	Lloyd Kenyon	Lloyd Kenyon	Attorney General for England and Wales
1 January 1784	Yorkshire	u	Sir George Savile	Francis Ferrand Foljambe	Resignation
3 January 1784	Appleby	u	William Pitt the Younger	William Pitt the Younger	First Lord of the Treasury and Chancellor of the Exchequer
3 January 1784	Launceston	u*	Charles George Perceval	Charles George Perceval	Lord of the Admiralty
3 January 1784	East Looe	u*	John Buller	John Buller	Junior Lord of the Treasury
3 January 1784	West Looe	u	Sir William James	John Buller	Death
3 January 1784	Ludgershall	u*	George Augustus Selwyn	George Augustus Selwyn	Surveyor General of the Land Revenues of the Crown
3 January 1784	St Germans	u	Edward James Eliot	Edward James Eliot	Junior Lord of the Treasury
3 January 1784	Westbury	u*	Samuel Estwick	Samuel Estwick	Secretary and Registrar of Chelsea Hospital
5 January 1784	Bath	u*	John Jeffreys Pratt	John Jeffreys Pratt	Lord of the Admiralty
5 January 1784	Buckingham	u	William Wyndham Grenville	William Wyndham Grenville	Paymaster of the Forces
5 January 1784	Richmond	u	Marquess of Graham	Marquess of Graham	Junior Lord of the Treasury
6 January 1784	Newtown	u	Richard Pepper Arden	Richard Pepper Arden	Solicitor General for England and Wales
6 January 1784	Old Sarum	u*	Thomas Pitt	John Charles Villiers	Elevated to the peerage
8 January 1784	Edinburghshire	u*	Henry Dundas	Henry Dundas	Treasurer of the Navy
20 January 1784	Aldborough	u*	Charles Mellish	John Gally Knight	Resignation
26 January 1784	City of London	c*	Frederick Bull	Brook Watson	Death
6 February 1784	Truro	c	John Pollexfen Bastard	Sir John St Aubyn	Resignation
14 February 1784	Leicester	u	John Darker	Shukburgh Ashby	Death
25 February 1784	Cornwall	u*	Edward Eliot	Sir William Molesworth	Elevated to the peerage
11 March 1784	Old Sarum	u*	Pinckney Wilkinson	George Hardinge	Death

=== 16th Parliament (1784–1790) ===
Date	Constituency	c/u	Former Incumbent	Winner	Cause
14 June 1784	Kingston upon Hull	u	William Wilberforce	Walter Spencer Stanhope	Chose to sit for Yorkshire
14 June 1784	Arundel	u	Earl of Surrey	Richard Beckford	Chose to sit for Carlisle
14 June 1784	New Romney	u	John Smith	Richard Atkinson	Resignation
19 June 1784	Minehead	u	Henry Beaufoy	Charles Phipps	Chose to sit for Great Yarmouth
19 June 1784	St Mawes	u*	The Earl Nugent	William Young	Resignation
21 June 1784	Midhurst	u	Benjamin Lethieullier	Edward Cotsford	Chose to sit for Andover
25 June 1784	Ipswich	c*	John Cator	Charles Alexander Crickitt	Void Election
25 June 1784	Southwark	c*	Sir Barnard Turner	Paul le Mesurier	Death
1 July 1784	Monmouthshire	u	John Hanbury	Viscount Nevill	Death
4 July 1784	Camelford	u*	Jonathan Phillips	Sir Samuel Hannay	Resignation
12 July 1784	Hereford	c	Earl of Surrey	Robert Philipps	Chose to sit for Carlisle
14 July 1784	Colchester	c	Christopher Potter	Sir Robert Smyth	Void Election
26 July 1784	Downton	c	Edward Bouverie	Edward Bouverie	Due to a Double Return four MPs were elected at the general election. Robert Shafto was declared elected and a by-election was held for the second seat where a Double Return occurred.
26 July 1784	Downton	c	Henry Seymour Conway	William Seymour Conway	Due to a Double Return four MPs were elected at the general election. Robert Shafto was declared elected and a by-election was held for the second seat where a Double Return occurred.
26 July 1784	Downton	c	William Scott	William Seymour Conway	Due to a Double Return four MPs were elected at the general election. Robert Shafto was declared elected and a by-election was held for the second seat where a Double Return occurred.
26 July 1784	Downton	c	William Seymour Conway	William Seymour Conway	Seymour Conway declared elected 11 March 1785
26 July 1784	Downton	c	Edward Bouverie	William Seymour Conway	Seymour Conway declared elected 11 March 1785
10 August 1784	Malton	u*	Sir Thomas Gascoigne	William Weddell	Resignation
11 August 1784	Andover	u*	Sir John Griffin Griffin	William Fellowes	Succeeded to a peerage
16 August 1784	Plympton Erle	u	Paul Treby Ourry	John Pardoe	Resignation
21 August 1784	West Looe	u	John Lemon	James Adams	Resignation
28 August 1784	Chipping Wycombe	u	Robert Waller	Robert Waller	Groom of the Bedchamber
30 August 1784	Newtown	u	James Worsley	Mark Gregory	Resignation
31 August 1784	Edinburgh	u	James Hunter Blair	Sir Adam Fergusson	Resignation
31 August 1784	Marlborough	u*	The Earl of Courtown	The Earl of Courtown	Treasurer of the Household
17 September 1784	Wigtownshire	u*	Keith Stewart	Andrew McDouall	Resignation (Receiver of Land Taxation for Scotland)
29 October 1784	Shrewsbury	u*	Sir Charlton Leighton	John Hill	Death
11 January 1785	Thirsk	u*	Sir Thomas Frankland	Robert Vyner	Death
31 January 1785	Stockbridge	u*	John Luttrell	James Gordon	Resignation (Commissioner of Excise)
2 February 1785	Wilton	u	Lord Herbert	Philip Goldsworthy	Resignation (Vice-Chamberlain of the Household)
8 February 1785	Ilchester	c	Peregrine Cust	John Harcourt	Death
8 February 1785	Ilchester	c	John Harcourt	George Johnstone	By-election results reversed on petition 22 February 1786
22 February 1785	Morpeth	u*	Sir James St Clair Erskine	Sir James St Clair Erskine	Accepts a beneficial interest in the Office of Director of Chancery in Scotland
29 March 1785	Seaford	c	Henry Nevill	Sir John Henderson	Void Election
29 March 1785	Seaford	c*	Sir Peter Parker	Sir Peter Parker	Void Election
11 April 1785	Hereford	u*	Robert Philipps	James Walwyn	Resignation
7 May 1785	Cirencester	u(*)	Samuel Blackwell	Richard Master	Death
12 May 1785	Dumfriesshire	u*	Sir Robert Laurie	Sir Robert Laurie	Knight Marischal
7 June 1785	New Romney	u	Richard Atkinson	John Henniker	Death
21 July 1785	Bridgwater	u	Anne Poulett	Robert Thornton	Death
25 July 1785	Beaumaris	u*	Hugh Fortescue	Sir Hugh Williams	Succeeded to a peerage
9 August 1785	Steyning	u	Sir John Honywood	Thomas Edwards Freeman	Resignation
9 August 1785	Wenlock	u	John Simpson	George Forester	Resignation
28 November 1785	Monmouthshire	u*	Viscount Nevill	James Rooke	Succeeded to a peerage
13 December 1785	Newport (Cornwall)	u	Sir John Coghill	William Mitford	Death
22 December 1785	Nairnshire	u	Alexander Campbell	Alexander Brodie	Death
3 February 1786	Westbury	u	Chaloner Arcedeckne	John Madocks	Resignation
6 February 1786	Haverfordwest	u*	The Lord Milford	The Lord Kensington	Resignation to contest Pembrokeshire
6 February 1786	Liskeard	u*	Edward James Eliot	Edward James Eliot	King's Remembrancer
7 February 1786	Richmond	u	Charles Dundas	Sir Grey Cooper	Resignation
9 February 1786	Pembrokeshire	u*	Sir Hugh Owen	The Lord Milford	Death
13 February 1786	Fowey	u(*)	John Grant	Richard Edgcumbe	Resignation
28 February 1786	Aberdeenshire	c	Alexander Garden	George Skene	Death
28 February 1786	Peterborough	u*	James Farrel Phipps	Lionel Damer	Death
3 March 1786	East Grinstead	u	Henry Arthur Herbert	James Cuninghame	Resignation
15 March 1786	Tain Burghs	c	Charles James Fox	George Ross	Chose to sit for Westminster
15 March 1786	Chipping Wycombe	u*	Viscount Mahon	Earl Wycombe	Succeeded to a peerage
21 March 1786	Seaford	c	Sir John Henderson	Sir John Henderson	Void Election
21 March 1786	Seaford	c	Sir Peter Parker	Sir Peter Parker	Void Election
21 March 1786	Seaford	c	Sir John Henderson	Henry Flood	By-election results reversed on petition 26 April 1786
21 March 1786	Seaford	c	Sir Peter Parker	Sir Godfrey Webster	By-election results reversed on petition 26 April 1786
27 March 1786	Weymouth and Melcombe Regis	u	Gabriel Steward	George Jackson	Resignation
31 March 1786	Lancaster	c*	Francis Reynolds	Sir George Warren	Succeeded to a peerage
1 April 1786	Helston	u	John Rogers	Roger Wilbraham	Resignation
10 April 1786	Carlisle	c	Edward Norton	John Lowther	Death
10 April 1786	Carlisle	c	John Lowther	John Christian	By-election results reversed on petition 31 May 1786
10 April 1786	Newport (I.o.W.)	u	Hugh Seymour Conway	John Thomas Townshend	Resignation
10 April 1786	Newton	u*	Thomas Davenport	Thomas Brooke	Death
14 April 1786	Selkirkshire	u*	John Pringle	Mark Pringle	Resignation
22 April 1786	Weobley	u*	Andrew Bayntun Rolt	Thomas Thynne	Resignation
4 May 1786	Bossiney	u	Bamber Gascoyne	Matthew Montagu	Resignation (Receiver General of Customs)
24 May 1786	East Looe	u	William Graves	Alexander Irvine	Resignation
13 June 1786	Haslemere	u	Thomas Postlethwaite	John Lowther	Resignation
30 June 1786	Tain Burghs	c*	George Ross	Charles Ross	Death
5 July 1786	Shaftesbury	u	Adam Drummond	John Drummond	Death
6 July 1786	Northumberland	u*	Lord Algernon Percy	Charles Grey	Succeeded to a peerage
15 July 1786	Wareham	u	Charles Lefebure	John Calcraft	Resignation
24 July 1786	Haddingtonshire	u*	Hew Dalrymple	John Hamilton	Resignation (Auditor of the Excise in Scotland)
16 August 1786	Kirkcudbrightshire	u*	Peter Johnston	Alexander Stewart	Resignation
4 September 1786	East Looe	u	John Buller	Richard Grosvenor	Death
16 September 1786	Norwich	c*	Sir Harbord Harbord	Henry Hobart	Elevated to the peerage
21 September 1786	Berwick-upon-Tweed	c	The Lord Delaval	Sir Gilbert Elliot	Became a British Peer
19 October 1786	Renfrewshire	c*	William MacDowall	John Shaw Stewart	Resignation
30 October 1786	Saltash	c	Charles Jenkinson	The Earl of Mornington	Elevated to the peerage
30 October 1786	Saltash	c	The Earl of Mornington	John Lemon	By-election results reversed on petition 7 May 1787
6 November 1786	Cockermouth	u	John Lowther	Humphrey Senhouse	Resignation to contest Carlisle
29 November 1786	Carlisle	c(*)	Earl of Surrey	Edward Knubley	Succeeded to a peerage
29 November 1786	Carlisle	c	Edward Knubley	Rowland Stephenson	By-election results reversed on petition 26 February 1787
15 December 1786	Minehead	u	Charles Phipps	Robert Wood	Death
27 January 1787	Helston	u(*)	Lord Hyde	James Bland Burges	Succeeded to a peerage
29 January 1787	Milborne Port	u	John Townson	William Popham	Resignation
29 January 1787	New Romney	u*	Sir Edward Dering	Richard Joseph Sullivan	Resignation
1 February 1787	Bere Alston	u	The Earl of Mornington	Charles Rainsford	Junior Lord of the Treasury
5 February 1787	Bury St Edmunds	u*	George Ferdinand FitzRoy	Lord Charles FitzRoy	Resignation
9 February 1787	Petersfield	u	Thomas Samuel Jolliffe	The Viscount Downe	Resignation
19 February 1787	Maldon	c	The Lord Waltham	Sir Peter Parker	Death
23 February 1787	Old Sarum	u*	John Charles Villiers	John Charles Villiers	Comptroller of the Household
24 February 1787	Ilchester	u	George Johnstone	George Sumner	Resignation
26 February 1787	Gatton	u	Maurice Lloyd	James Fraser	Resignation
6 March 1787	Truro	u*	William Macarmick	John Hiley Addington	Resignation (Lieutenant-Governor of Cape Breton Island)
9 March 1787	Durham City	u*	John Lambton	William Henry Lambton	Resignation
12 March 1787	Ashburton	u*	Robert Palk	Lawrence Palk	Resignation
28 March 1787	Norwich	c*	Henry Hobart	Henry Hobart	Void Election
11 April 1787	Yarmouth	u*	Edward Morant	Thomas Clarke Jervoise	Resignation
9 May 1787	Huntingdon	u*	Lancelot Brown	John Willett Payne	Resignation
15 May 1787	Staffordshire	u*	Sir John Wrottesley	Earl Gower	Death
4 June 1787	Reigate	u	Edward Leeds	Reginald Pole Carew	Resignation
20 June 1787	Breconshire	u*	Charles Morgan	Sir Charles Gould	Death
22 June 1787	Haddington Burghs	u	Francis Charteris	William Fullarton	Became the Eldest of a Scottish Peer
6 July 1787	Fifeshire	u*	Robert Skene	William Wemyss	Death
17 July 1787	Argyllshire	u*	Lord Frederick Campbell	Lord Frederick Campbell	Resignation pending appointment as Vice-Treasurer of Ireland
19 July 1787	New Windsor	u*	Lord Montagu	The Earl of Mornington	Death
1 August 1787	Sutherland	u*	William Wemyss	James Grant	Resignation to contest Fifeshire
20 August 1787	Calne	u*	James Townsend	Joseph Jekyll	Death
5 October 1787	Dartmouth	u*	Arthur Holdsworth	Edmund Bastard	Death
4 December 1787	Old Sarum	u*	George Hardinge	George Hardinge	Chief Justice of Breconshire
6 December 1787	Brecon	u*	Charles Morgan	Charles Gould	Resignation to contest Breconshire
20 December 1787	Bletchingley	u*	John Nicholls	Sir Robert Clayton	Resignation
21 December 1787	Ripon	u	Frederick Robinson	Sir John Goodricke	Resignation (Granted a pension)
26 December 1787	Harwich	u*	John Robinson	John Robinson	Surveyor General of Woods, Forests, Parks, and Chases
8 February 1788	Totnes	u	Sir Philip Jennings Clerke	Viscount Barnard	Death
9 February 1788	Wilton	u*	Philip Goldsworthy	Lord Herbert	Resignation
1 April 1788	Monmouth	u*	Sir John Stepney	Marquess of Worcester	Resignation
17 April 1788	Steyning	u	Thomas Edwards Freeman	Sir John Honywood	Death
22 April 1788	East Looe	u*	Richard Grosvenor	Viscount Belgrave	Resignation
24 April 1788	Tavistock	u	Richard Rigby	Lord John Russell	Death
20 May 1788	Denbigh Boroughs	u*	Richard Myddelton	Richard Myddelton	Resignation
29 May 1788	Cambridge	u*	John Mortlock	Francis Dickins	Resignation
16 June 1788	Tregony	u	Sir Lloyd Kenyon	Hugh Seymour Conway	Elevated to the peerage
18 June 1788	Launceston	u	George Rose	Sir John Swinburne	Clerk of the Parliaments
19 June 1788	Kincardineshire	u*	Lord Adam Gordon	Robert Barclay Allardice	Resignation
25 June 1788	Aldborough	u	Richard Pepper Arden	Richard Pepper Arden	Master of the Rolls
1 July 1788	Lymington	u	Harry Burrard	George Rose	Resignation
1 July 1788	New Windsor	u*	Peniston Portlock Powney	Peniston Portlock Powney	Ranger of Windsor Little Park
4 July 1788	Newcastle-under-Lyme	u*	Archibald Macdonald	Sir Archibald Macdonald	Attorney General for England and Wales
7 July 1788	Weobley	u*	Sir John Scott	Sir John Scott	Solicitor General for England and Wales
9 July 1788	New Woodstock	u	Francis Burton	Francis Burton	Second Justice of Chester
12 July 1788	Hindon	u	Edward Bearcroft	Edward Bearcroft	Chief Justice of Chester
14 July 1788	Maidstone	c*	Gerard Edwards	Matthew Bloxham	Resignation to contest Rutland
15 July 1788	Rutland	u*	Thomas Noel	Gerard Edwards	Death
4 August 1788	Westminster	c	The Lord Hood	Lord John Townshend	Naval Lord
3 September 1788	St Germans	u	Abel Smith	Samuel Smith	Death
8 October 1788	East Grinstead	u	James Cuninghame	Robert Cuninghame	Death
23 October 1788	Christchurch	u*	James Harris	Hans Sloane	Elevated to the peerage
29 November 1788	Clackmannanshire	u	Charles Allan Cathcart	Burnet Abercromby	Death
15 December 1788	Bramber	u	Daniel Pulteney	Robert Hobart	Resignation (Collector of Customs in Dominica)
15 December 1788	Colchester	c(*)	Sir Edmund Affleck	George Tierney	Death (Two MPs elected due to a Double Return)
15 December 1788	Colchester	c(*)	Sir Edmund Affleck	George Jackson	Death (Two MPs elected due to a Double Return)
15 December 1788	Colchester	c(*)	George Tierney	George Tierney	Tierney declared elected 6 April 1789
15 December 1788	Colchester	c(*)	George Jackson	George Tierney	Tierney declared elected 6 April 1789
19 December 1788	Wiltshire	u*	Charles Penruddocke	Sir James Tylney Long	Death
23 December 1788	Bere Alston	u*	Charles Rainsford	John Mitford	Resignation
23 December 1788	Devizes	u*	Sir James Tylney Long	Joshua Smith	Resignation to contest Wiltshire
27 December 1788	Weymouth and Melcombe Regis	u	George Jackson	Gabriel Steward	Resignation to contest Colchester
13 January 1789	Rye	u*	Charles Wolfran Cornwall	Charles Long	Death
14 January 1789	Dover	c*	James Luttrell	John Trevanion	Death
19 January 1789	Surrey	u*	William Norton	Lord William Russell	Succeeded to a peerage
22 January 1789	Banffshire	u	Sir James Duff	James Ferguson	Resignation
5 February 1789	Gloucester	c*	Sir Charles Barrow	John Pitt	Death
16 February 1789	Aylesbury	c*	Sir Thomas Hallifax	Scrope Bernard	Death
27 February 1789	East Grinstead	u	Robert Cuninghame	Richard Ford	Resignation
4 March 1789	Worcester	u*	William Ward	Edmund Wigley	Succeeded to a peerage
8 April 1789	Gloucestershire	u*	George Cranfield Berkeley	George Cranfield Berkeley	Surveyor-General of the Ordnance
11 May 1789	Cambridge	u*	James Whorwood Adeane	Edward Finch	Groom of the Bedchamber
19 May 1789	Cambridgeshire	u*	Sir Henry Peyton	James Whorwood Adeane	Death
19 June 1789	Buckinghamshire	u*	William Wyndham Grenville	William Wyndham Grenville	Home Secretary
4 July 1789	Dorchester	u	William Ewer	Thomas Ewer	Death
6 July 1789	Brackley	u*	Timothy Caswall	Samuel Haynes	Resignation (Commissioner of Excise)
29 July 1789	Bere Alston	u*	John Mitford	John Mitford	Justice of Cardiganshire, Pembrokeshire and Carmarthenshire
3 August 1789	Ayrshire	u	Hugh Montgomerie	William MacDowall	Resignation (Inspector of Military Roads in Scotland)
7 August 1789	Bath	u*	Viscount Bayham	Viscount Bayham	Junior Lord of the Treasury
7 August 1789	Cirencester	u*	Lord Apsley	Lord Apsley	Junior Lord of the Treasury
10 August 1789	Great Bedwyn	u*	Marquess of Graham	Marquess of Graham	Joint Paymaster of the Forces
18 August 1789	Reigate	u	William Bellingham	The Lord Hood	Resignation (Victualling Commissioner)
21 August 1789	Stirling Burghs	u	James Campbell	Sir Archibald Campbell	Resignation
24 August 1789	East Looe	u	Viscount Belgrave	Viscount Belgrave	Resignation pending appointment as a Lord of the Admiralty
28 August 1789	Denbighshire	u*	Sir Watkin Williams Wynn	Robert Watkin Wynne	Death
1 September 1789	Ripon	u*	Sir John Goodricke	Sir George Allanson Winn	Death
4 September 1789	Glamorganshire	u*	Charles Edwin	Thomas Wyndham	Resignation
14 September 1789	Morpeth	u*	Peter Delmé	Francis Gregg	Death
27 November 1789	Bodmin	u	Thomas Hunt	George Wilbraham	Death
5 December 1789	Lichfield	u	George Anson	Thomas Anson	Death
28 January 1790	Newport (I.o.W.)	u	John Thomas Townshend	George Byng	Resignation (Lord of the Admiralty)
30 January 1790	Dorchester	u(*)	Thomas Ewer	Cropley Ashley	Death
1 February 1790	Malmesbury	u*	Viscount Maitland	Paul Benfield	Became a Scottish Peer
1 February 1790	Plymouth	u*	Robert Fanshawe	Alan Gardner	Resignation (Commissioner of the Navy)
1 February 1790	St Germans	u	John Hamilton	Sir Charles Hamilton	Succeeded to a peerage
4 February 1790	East Looe	u	Alexander Irvine	The Earl of Carysfort	Death
26 February 1790	Glasgow Burghs	c	Ilay Campbell	John Craufurd	Resignation (Lord President of the Court of Session)
26 February 1790	Tiverton	u*	Dudley Ryder	Dudley Ryder	Comptroller of the Household
1 March 1790	Old Sarum	u	John Charles Villiers	John Charles Villiers	Chief Justice in Eyre North of Trent
20 March 1790	Cricklade	u*	Robert Nicholas	Thomas Estcourt	Resignation (Commissioner of Excise)
25 May 1790	Cirencester	u*	Lord Apsley	Lord Apsley	Teller of the Receipt of the Exchequer
