= List of MPs elected in the 1780 British general election =

1780–1784 Parliament of Great Britain
←	1774–1780 Parliament	1790–1796 Parliament	→

Overview
- Legislative body: Parliament of Great Britain
- Meeting place: Palace of Westminster
- Term: 1 November 1780 – 24 March 1784
- Election: 1780 British general election
- Government: North ministry (until 1782); Second Rockingham ministry (March–July 1782); Shelburne ministry (July 1782–March 1783); Fox–North coalition (April–December 1783); First Pitt ministry (from December 1783)

House of Commons
- Members: 558
- Speaker: Charles Wolfran Cornwall
- Leader: Frederick North (until 22 March 1782); Charles James Fox (27 March–July 1782); Thomas Townshend (10 July 1782–6 March 1783); Frederick North and Charles James Fox (joint, 2 April–19 December 1783); William Pitt the Younger (from December 1783)

House of Lords
- Lord Chancellor: The Baron Thurlow (until 7 April 1783); In commission (9 April–23 December 1783); The Baron Thurlow (from 23 December 1783)
- Leader: 2nd Earl of Mansfield (until March 1782); 2nd Earl of Shelburne (March 1782–April 1783); 3rd Duke of Portland (2 April–December 1783); 1st Marquess of Buckingham (December 1783); 1st Viscount Sydney (from December 1783)

Crown-in-Parliament King George III

Sessions
- 1st: 1 November 1780 – 18 July 1781
- 2nd: 27 November 1781 – 11 July 1782
- 3rd: 5 December 1782 – 16 July 1783
- 4th: 11 November 1783 – 24 March 1784

List of MPs elected in the 1780 British general election

This is a list of the 558 MPs or members of Parliament elected to the 314 constituencies of the Parliament of Great Britain in 1780, the 15th Parliament of Great Britain and their replacements returned at subsequent by-elections, arranged by constituency.

Table of contents:

A B C D E F G H I J K L M N O P Q R S T U V W X Y Z By-elections Changes

== A ==
Aberdeen Burghs (seat 1/1)	Adam Drummond	
Aberdeenshire (seat 1/1)	Alexander Garden	Independent
Abingdon (seat 1/1)	John Mayor – resigned Replaced by Henry Howorth 1782 – died Replaced by Edward Loveden Loveden 1783	Tory Whig
Aldborough (seat 1/2)	Sir Richard Sutton, Bt – sat for Sandwich; Replaced by Edward Onslow 1780 – resigned Replaced by Sir Samuel Brudenell Fludyer, Bt 1781	
Aldborough (seat 2/2)	Charles Mellish – resigned Replaced by John Gally Knight 1784	
Aldeburgh (seat 1/2)	Martyn Fonnereau	
Aldeburgh (seat 2/2)	Philip Champion Crespigny	
Amersham (seat1/2)	William Drake, Jr.	Tory
Amersham (seat 2/2)	William Drake, Sr.	Tory
Andover (seat 1/2)	Benjamin Lethieullier	
Andover (seat 2/2)	Sir John Griffin	
Anglesey (seat 1/1)	The Viscount Bulkeley	
Anstruther Easter Burghs (seat 1/1)	Sir John Anstruther – resigned Replaced by John Anstruther 1783	
Appleby (seat 1/2)	William Lowther – sat for Carlisle; Replaced by William Pitt the Younger 1781	Tory; Whig
Appleby (seat 2/2)	Philip Honywood	
Argyllshire (seat 1/1)	Lord Frederick Campbell	
Arundel (seat 1/2)	Sir Patrick Crauford – void election Replaced by Peter William Baker 1781	
Arundel (seat 2/2)	Thomas Fitzherbert	
Ashburton (seat 1/2)	Robert Palk	
Ashburton (seat 2/2)	Charles Boone	
Aylesbury (seat 1/2)	Anthony Bacon	
Aylesbury (seat 2/2)	Thomas Orde	Tory
Ayr Burghs (seat 1/1)	Archibald Edmonstone	Tory
Ayrshire (seat 1/1)	Hugh Montgomerie – unseated on petition Replaced by Sir Adam Fergusson 1781	
== B ==
Banbury (seat 1/1)	Frederick North, Lord North	Tory
Banffshire (seat 1/1)	James Duff	
Barnstaple (seat 1/2)	Francis Bassett	
Barnstaple (seat 2/2)	John Clevland	Whig
Bath (seat 1/2)	Abel Moysey	
Bath (seat 2/2)	Hon. John Jeffreys Pratt	
Beaumaris (seat 1/1)	Sir George Warren	
Bedford (seat 1/2)	Sir William Wake, 8th Baronet	
Bedford (seat 2/2)	Samuel Whitbread	
Bedfordshire (seat 1/2)	John FitzPatrick, 2nd Earl of Upper Ossory	Whig
Bedfordshire (seat 2/2)	Hon. St Andrew St John	
Bere Alston (seat 1/2)	Lord Algernon Percy – sat for Northumberland; Replaced by Viscount Feilding 1780	
Bere Alston (seat 2/2)	The Lord Macartney – resigned Replaced by Laurence Cox 1781	
Berkshire (seat 1/2)	Winchcombe Henry Hartley	
Berkshire (seat 2/2)	John Elwes	
Berwickshire (seat 1/1)	Hugh Hepburne-Scott – void election re-elected1781	
Berwick-upon-Tweed (seat 1/2)	Sir John Delaval, Bt	
Berwick-upon-Tweed (seat 2/2)	Hon. John Vaughan	
Beverley (seat 1/2)	Francis Evelyn Anderson	
Beverley (seat 2/2)	Sir James Pennyman, Bt	
Bewdley (seat 1/1)	William Henry Lyttelton	
Bishops Castle (seat 1/2)	William Clive	
Bishops Castle (seat 2/2)	Henry Strachey	
Bletchingley (seat 1/2)	John Kenrick	
Bletchingley (seat 2/2)	Sir Robert Clayton – resigned Replaced by John Nicholls 1783	
Bodmin (seat 1/2)	William Masterman	
Bodmin (seat 2/2)	George Hunt	
Boroughbridge (seat 1/2)	Anthony Eyre	
Boroughbridge (seat 2/2)	Charles Ambler, KC	
Bossiney (seat 1/2)	Hon. Charles Stuart	
Bossiney (seat 2/2)	Henry Lawes Luttrell	
Boston (seat 1/2)	Lord Robert Bertie – died Replaced by Sir Peter Burrell 1782	
Boston (seat 2/2)	Humphrey Sibthorp	
Brackley (seat 1/2)	John William Egerton	
Brackley (seat 2/2)	Timothy Caswall	
Bramber (seat 1/2)	Thomas Thoroton – took office Replaced by Hon. Henry Fitzroy Stanhope 1782	
Bramber (seat 2/2)	Sir Henry Gough	
Brecon (seat 1/1)	Charles Gould,	
Breconshire (seat 1/1)	Charles Morgan	
Bridgnorth (seat 1/2)	Hugh Pigot	
Bridgnorth (seat 2/2)	Thomas Whitmore	
Bridgwater (seat 1/2)	Hon. Anne Poulett	
Bridgwater (seat 2/2)	Benjamin Allen – unseated on petition Replaced by John Acland 1781	
Bridport (seat 1/2)	Thomas Scott	
Bridport (seat 2/2)	Richard Beckford	
Bristol (seat 1/2)	Matthew Brickdale	
Bristol (seat 2/2)	Sir Henry Lippincott, Bt – died Replaced by George Daubeny 1781	
Buckingham (seat 1/2)	Richard Aldworth-Neville – Took office Replaced by William Grenville 1782	
Buckingham (seat 2/2)	James Grenville	Grenvillite
Buckinghamshire (seat 1/2)	Ralph Verney, Earl Verney	
Buckinghamshire (seat 2/2)	Thomas Grenville	
Bury St Edmunds (seat 1/2)	Sir Charles Davers, Bt	
Bury St Edmunds (seat 2/2)	Henry Seymour Conway	
Buteshire (seat 0/0)	Alternating seat with Caithness. No representation in 1780	
== C ==
Caernarvon Boroughs (seat 1/1)	Glyn Wynn	
Caernarvonshire (seat 1/1)	John Parry	
Caithness (seat 0/0)	John Sinclair	
Callington (seat 1/2)	George Stratton	
Callington (seat 2/2)	John Morshead	
Calne (seat 1/2)	John Dunning – ennobled Replaced by James Townsend 1782	
Calne (seat 2/2)	Isaac Barré	
Cambridge (seat 1/2)	James Whorwood Adeane	
Cambridge (seat 2/2)	Benjamin Keene	
Cambridgeshire (seat 1/2)	Lord Robert Manners – died Replaced by Sir Henry Peyton, Bt 1782	
Cambridgeshire (seat 2/2)	Viscount Royston	
Cambridge University (seat 1/2)	Lord John Townshend	
Cambridge University (seat 2/2)	James Mansfield	
Camelford (seat 1/2)	John Amyand	
Camelford (seat 2/2)	James Macpherson	
Canterbury (seat 1/2)	George Gipps	
Canterbury (seat 2/2)	Charles Robinson	
Cardiff Boroughs (seat 1/1)	Sir Herbert Mackworth	
Cardigan Boroughs (seat 1/1)	John Campbell	
Cardiganshire (seat 1/1)	Viscount Lisburne	
Carlisle (seat 1/2)	Earl of Surrey	
Carlisle (seat 2/2)	William Lowther	
Carmarthen (seat 1/1)	George Philipps	
Carmarthenshire (seat 1/1)	John Vaughan II	
Castle Rising (seat 1/2)	John Chetwynd Talbot – succeeded to peerage Replaced by Major Sir James Erskine 1782	
Castle Rising (seat 2/2)	Robert Mackreth	
Cheshire (seat 1/2)	John Crewe	Whig
Cheshire (seat 2/2)	Sir Robert Salusbury Cotton, Bt	
Chester (seat 1/2)	Richard Wilbraham-Bootle	
Chester (seat 2/2)	Thomas Grosvenor	
Chichester (seat 1/2)	William Keppel – died Replaced by Percy Charles Wyndham 1782	
Chichester (seat 2/2)	Thomas Steele	
Chippenham (seat 1/2)	Henry Dawkins	
Chippenham (seat 2/2)	Giles Hudson – died Replaced by George Fludyer 1783	
Chipping Wycombe (seat 1/2)	Viscount Mahon	
Chipping Wycombe (seat 2/2)	Robert Waller	
Christchurch (seat 1/2)	Sir James Harris	
Christchurch (seat 2/2)	James Harris – died replaced by (Sir) John Frederick 1783	Whig
Cirencester (seat 1/2)	Samuel Blackwell	
Cirencester (seat 2/2)	James Whitshed – resigned Replaced by Lord Apsley 1783	
Clackmannanshire (seat 0/0)	Alternating seat with Kinross-shire. No representation in 1780	
Clitheroe (seat 1/2)	Thomas Lister	
Clitheroe (seat 2/2)	John Parker – resigned Replaced by John Lee 1785	
Cockermouth (seat 1/2)	John Lowther	
Cockermouth (seat 2/2)	John Baynes Garforth	
Colchester (seat 1/2)	Sir Robert Smyth, Bt	Rad. Whig
Colchester (seat 2/2)	Isaac Martin Rebow – died Replaced by Christopher Potter 1781 – on petition Replaced by Sir Edmund Affleck, Bt 1782	Whig
Corfe Castle (seat 1/2)	John Bond	
Corfe Castle (seat 2/2)	Henry Bankes	
Cornwall (seat 1/2)	Edward Eliot ennobled Sir William Molesworth, Bt 1784	
Cornwall (seat 2/2)	Sir William Lemon	
Coventry (seat 1/2)	Sir Thomas Hallifax – unseated on petition Replaced by Edward Roe Yeo 1781– died replaced by Hon. William Seymour-Conway 1783	
Coventry (seat 2/2)	Thomas Rogers – unseated on petition Replaced by The Lord Sheffield 1781	
Cricklade (seat 1/2)	Paul Benfield	
Cricklade (seat 2/2)	John Macpherson – void election Replaced by Hon. George St John 1782	
Cromartyshire (seat 1/1)	George Ross	
Cumberland (seat 1/2)	Henry Fletcher	
Cumberland (seat 2/2)	Sir James Lowther, Bt	
== D ==
Dartmouth (seat 1/2)	Arthur Holdsworth	
Dartmouth (seat 2/2)	Richard Howe, Viscount Howe – ennobled Replaced by Charles Brett 1782	
Denbigh Boroughs (seat 1/1)	Richard Myddelton	
Denbighshire (seat 1/1)	Sir Watkin Williams-Wynn, 4th Baronet	
Derby (seat 1/2)	Lord George Cavendish	
Derby (seat 2/2)	Edward Coke	
Derbyshire (seat 1/2)	Lord Richard Cavendish – died Replaced by Lord George Cavendish 1781	Whig; Whig
Derbyshire (seat 2/2)	Hon. Nathaniel Curzon	Tory
Devizes (seat 1/2)	James Tylney Long	
Devizes (seat 2/2)	Charles Garth – took office Replaced by Henry Jones 1780	
Devon (seat 1/2)	John Parker	
Devon (seat 2/2)	John Rolle	
Dorchester (seat 1/2)	Hon. George Damer	
Dorchester (seat 2/2)	William Ewer	
Dorset (seat 1/2)	Humphrey Sturt	
Dorset (seat 2/2)	Hon. George Pitt	
Dover (seat 1/2)	John Henniker	
Dover (seat 2/2)	John Trevenion	
Downton (seat 1/2)	Robert Shafto	
Downton (seat 2/2)	Hon. Henry Seymour-Conway	
Droitwich (seat 1/2)	Sir Edward Winnington, Bt	
Droitwich (seat 2/2)	Andrew Foley	
Dumfries Burghs (seat 1/1)	Sir Robert Herries	
Dumfriesshire (seat 1/1)	Sir Robert Laurie, Bt	
Dunbartonshire (seat 1/1)	Lord Frederick Campbell – unseated on petition Replaced by George Keith Elphinstone 1781	
Dunwich (seat 1/2)	Barne Barne	
Dunwich (seat 2/2)	Gerard Vanneck	
Durham (City of) (seat 1/2)	John Tempest	
Durham (City of) (seat 2/2)	John Lambton	
Durham (County) (seat 1/2)	Sir Thomas Clavering, 7th Baronet	
Durham (County) (seat 2/2)	Sir John Eden, Bt	
Dysart Burghs (seat 1/1)	Sir John Henderson	
== E ==
East Grinstead (seat 1/2)	Lord George Germain – ennobled Replaced by Henry Arthur Herbert 1782	
East Grinstead (seat 2/2)	John Irwin resigned George Medley 1783	
East Looe (seat 1/2)	William Graves – resigned Replaced by John James Hamilton 1783	
East Looe (seat 2/2)	John Buller	
East Retford (seat 1/2)	Wharton Amcotts	
East Retford (seat 2/2)	Lord John Pelham-Clinton – died Replaced by Earl of Lincoln 1781	
Edinburgh (seat 1/1)	William Miller – unseated on petition Replaced by Sir Lawrence Dundas 1781 – died replaced by James Hunter Blair 1781	
Edinburghshire (seat 1/1)	Henry Dundas	
Elgin Burghs (seat 1/1)	Staats Long Morris	
Elginshire (seat 1/1)	Lord William Gordon	
Essex (seat 1/2)	John Luther	
Essex (seat 2/2)	Thomas Berney Bramston	
Evesham (seat 1/2)	Charles Boughton	
Evesham (seat 2/2)	John Rushout	
Exeter (seat 1/2)	Sir Charles Warwick Bampfylde	
Exeter (seat 2/2)	John Baring	
Eye (seat 1/2)	Richard Burton Phillipson	
Eye (seat 2/2)	Arnoldus Jones-Skelton – resigned Replaced by Hon. William Cornwallis 1782	
== F ==
Fife (seat 1/1)	Robert Skene	
Flint Boroughs (seat 1/1)	Watkin Williams	
Flintshire (seat 1/1)	Sir Roger Mostyn, Bt	
Forfarshire (seat 1/1)	William Maule, Earl Panmure – died Replaced by Archibald Douglas 1782	
Fowey (seat 1/2)	Philip Rashleigh	
Fowey (seat 2/2)	The Lord Shuldham	
== G ==
Gatton (seat 1/2)	Robert Mayne – died Replaced by Maurice Lloyd, 1783	
Gatton (seat 2/2)	The Lord Newhaven	
Glamorganshire (seat 1/1)	Charles Edwin	
Glasgow Burghs (seat 1/1)	John Craufurd	
Gloucester (seat 1/2)	John Webb	
Gloucester (seat 2/2)	Charles Barrow	
Gloucestershire (seat 1/2)	William Bromley-Chester – died Replaced by James Dutton 1781	
Gloucestershire (seat 2/2)	Sir William Guise, Bt – died Replaced by Hon. George Cranfield Berkeley 1783	
Grampound (seat 1/2)	Sir John Ramsden, Bt	
Grampound (seat 2/2)	Thomas Lucas	
Grantham (seat 1/2)	Francis Cockayne-Cust	
Grantham (seat 2/2)	George Manners-Sutton	
Great Bedwyn (seat 1/2)	Sir Merrick Burrell	
Great Bedwyn (seat 2/2)	Paul Methuen – resigned Replaced by Paul Cobb Methuen 1781	
Great Grimsby (seat 1/2)	John Harrison	
Great Grimsby (seat 2/2)	Francis Eyre	
Great Marlow (seat 1/2)	William Clayton I – died Replaced by William Clayton II 1783	
Great Marlow (seat 2/2)	Sir John Borlase Warren	
Great Yarmouth (seat 1/2)	Charles Townshend	
Great Yarmouth (seat 2/2)	Hon. Richard Walpole	
Guildford (seat 1/2)	Sir Fletcher Norton – ennobled Replaced by William Norton 1782	
Guildford (seat 2/2)	George Onslow	
== H ==
Haddington Burghs (seat 1/1)	Francis Charteris	
Haddingtonshire (seat 1/1)	Hew Dalrymple	
Hampshire (seat 1/2)	Robert Thistlethwayte	
Hampshire (seat 2/2)	Jervoise Clarke Jervoise	
Harwich (seat 1/2)	George North	
Harwich (seat 2/2)	John Robinson	
Haslemere (seat 1/2)	Sir James Lowther – sat for Cumberland; Replaced by Walter Spencer Stanhope, 1780	
Haslemere (seat 2/2)	Edward Norton	
Hastings (seat 1/2)	Henry Temple, Lord Palmerston	
Hastings (seat 2/2)	John Ord	
Haverfordwest (seat 1/1)	Baron Kensington	
Hedon (seat 1/2)	Christopher Atkinson – expelled for perjury Replaced by Stephen Lushington 1783	
Hedon (seat 2/2)	William Chaytor	
Helston (seat 1/2)	Jocelyn Deane – died Replaced by Richard Barwell 1781	
Helston (seat 2/2)	Philip Yorke – resigned Replaced by Lord Hyde 1781	
Hereford (seat 1/2)	Richard Symons	
Hereford (seat 2/2)	John Scudamore	
Herefordshire (seat 1/2)	Thomas Harley	
Herefordshire (seat 2/2)	Sir George Cornewall, Bt	
Hertford (seat 1/2)	Thomas, Baron Dimsdale	
Hertford (seat 2/2)	William Baker	
Hertfordshire (seat 1/2)	William Plumer	
Hertfordshire (seat 2/2)	Thomas Halsey	
Heytesbury (seat 1/2)	William Ashe-à Court – died Replaced by William Pierce Ashe A'Court 1781	
Heytesbury (seat 2/2)	William Eden – sat for Woodstock; Replaced by Francis Burton 1780	
Higham Ferrers (seat 1/1)	Frederick Montagu	
Hindon (seat 1/2)	Lloyd Kenyon	
Hindon (seat 2/2)	Nathaniel William Wraxall	
Honiton (seat 1/2)	Sir George Yonge, Bt	
Honiton (seat 2/2)	Alexander Macleod – election void Replaced by Jacob Wilkinson 1781	
Horsham (seat 1/2)	Viscount Lewisham – died Replaced by Sir George Osborn, Bt 1780	
Horsham (seat 2/2)	James Wallace – died Replaced by James Craufurd 1783	
Huntingdon (seat 1/2)	George Wombwell – died Hugh Palliser	
Huntingdon (seat 2/2)	Constantine John Phipps	
Huntingdonshire (seat 1/2)	Viscount Hinchingbrooke	
Huntingdonshire (seat 2/2)	The Earl Ludlow	
Hythe (seat 1/2)	Sir Charles Farnaby	
Hythe (seat 2/2)	William Evelyn	
== I ==
Ilchester (seat 1/2)	Peregrine Cust	
Ilchester (seat 2/2)	Samuel Smith	
Inverness Burghs (seat 1/1)	Sir Hector Munro	
Inverness-shire (seat 1/1)	Simon Fraser – died Replaced by Archibald Campbell Fraser 1782	
Ipswich (seat 1/2)	William Wollaston	
Ipswich (seat 2/2)	Thomas Staunton	
== K ==
Kent (seat 1/2)	Hon. Charles Marsham Bt	
Kent (seat 2/2)	Filmer Honywood	
Kincardineshire (seat 1/1)	Lord Adam Gordon	
King's Lynn (seat 1/2)	Thomas Walpole	
King's Lynn (seat 2/2)	Crisp Molineux	
Kingston upon Hull (seat 1/2)	Lord Robert Manners – died Replaced by David Hartley 1782	
Kingston upon Hull (seat 2/2)	William Wilberforce	
Kinross-shire (seat 1/)	George Graham	
Kirkcudbright Stewartry (seat 1/1)	Peter Johnston – void election Replaced by John Gordon 1781 – result reversed Replaced by Peter Johnston 1782	
Knaresborough (seat 1/2)	Robert Boyle-Walsingham – died Replaced by James Hare 1781	
Knaresborough (seat 2/2)	Viscount Duncannon	
== L ==
Lanarkshire (seat 1/1)	Andrew Stuart	
Lancashire (seat 1/2)	Thomas Stanley	
Lancashire (seat 2/2)	Sir Thomas Egerton	
Lancaster (seat 1/2)	Wilson Braddyll	
Lancaster (seat 2/2)	Abraham Rawlinson	
Launceston (seat 1/2)	Viscount Cranborne – succeeded to peerage Replaced by Hon. Charles Perceval 1780	
Launceston (seat 2/2)	Thomas Bowlby – resigned Replaced by Sir John Jervis 1783	
Leicester (seat 1/2)	Hon. Booth Grey	
Leicester (seat 2/2)	John Darker – died Replaced by Shukburgh Ashby 1784	
Leicestershire (seat 1/2)	William Pochin	
Leicestershire (seat 2/2)	John Peach-Hungerford	
Leominster (seat 1/2)	Richard Payne Knight	
Leominster (seat 2/2)	John Bateman, Viscount Bateman	
Lewes (seat 1/2)	Henry Pelham	
Lewes (seat 2/2)	Thomas Gilbert	
Lichfield (seat 1/2)	George Adams (later Anson)	
Lichfield (seat 2/2)	Thomas Kemp	
Lincoln (seat 1/2)	Sir Thomas Clarges, Bt – died Replaced by John Fenton-Cawthorne 1783	
Lincoln (seat 2/2)	Robert Vyner	
Lincolnshire (seat 1/2)	SirJohn Thorold	
Lincolnshire (seat 2/2)	Charles Anderson-Pelham	
Linlithgow Burghs (seat 1/1)	Sir John Moore	
Linlithgowshire (seat 1/1)	Sir William Cunynghame	
Liskeard (seat 1/2)	Wilbraham Tollemache	
Liskeard (seat 2/2)	Samuel Salt	
Liverpool (seat 1/2)	Bamber Gascoyne	
Liverpool (seat 2/2)	Henry Rawlinson	
London (City of) (seat 1/4)	John Kirkman – died Replaced by John Sawbridge 1780	
London (City of) (seat 2/4)	Frederick Bull – died Replaced by Brook Watson	
London (City of) (seat 3/4)	Nathaniel Newman	
London (City of) (seat 4/4)	George Hayley – died Replaced by Sir Watkin Lewes 1781	
Lostwithiel (seat 1/2)	Hon. John St. John – sat for Newport; Replaced by Commodore George Johnstone 1780	
Lostwithiel (seat 2/2)	Hon. Thomas de Grey – succeeded to peerage Replaced by Viscount Malden 1781	
Ludgershall (seat 1/2)	George Augustus Selwyn	
Ludgershall (seat 2/2)	Peniston Lamb	
Ludlow (seat 1/2)	Frederick Cornewall – died Replaced by Somerset Davies1783	
Ludlow (seat 2/2)	The Lord Clive	
Lyme Regis (seat 1/2)	Lionel Darell – double return Replaced by Hon. Henry Fane 1781	
Lyme Regis (seat 2/2)	Henry Harford – double return Replaced by David Robert Michel 1781	
Lymington (seat 1/2)	Thomas Dummer – died Replaced by Edward Gibbon 1781	
Lymington (seat 2/2)	Harry Burrard	
== M ==
Maidstone (seat 1/2)	Sir Horatio Mann	
Maidstone (seat 2/2)	Clement Taylor	
Maldon (seat 1/2)	John Strutt –	Tory
Maldon (seat 2/2)	Eliab Harvey	
Malmesbury (seat 1/2)	Viscount Lewisham – sat for Staffordshire; Replaced by John Calvert 1780	
Malmesbury (seat 2/2)	Viscount Fairford	
Malton (seat 1/2)	Savile Finch – Resigned; Replaced by Edmund Burke 1780	
Malton (seat 2/2)	William Weddell	
Marlborough (seat 1/2)	The Earl of Courtown	
Marlborough (seat 2/2)	William Woodley	
Merionethshire (seat 1/1)	Evan Lloyd Vaughan	
Middlesex (seat 1/2)	John Wilkes	Radical
Middlesex (seat 2/2)	George Byng	
Midhurst (seat 1/2)	Hon. John St John – sat for Newport; Replaced by Sir Sampson Gideon 1780	
Midhurst (seat 2/2)	Hon. Henry Drummond	
Milborne Port (seat 1/2)	John Townson	
Milborne Port (seat 2/2)	Thomas Hutchings-Medlycott – resigned Replaced by John Pennington 1781	
Minehead (seat 1/2)	Francis Fownes Luttrell resigned Replaced by Henry Beaufoy 1783	
Minehead (seat 2/2)	John Fownes Luttrell	
Mitchell (seat 1/2)	Hon. William Hanger	
Mitchell (seat 2/2)	Francis Hale	
Monmouth Boroughs (seat 1/1)	John Stepney	
Monmouthshire (seat 1/2)	John Morgan	
Monmouthshire (seat 2/2)	John Hanbury	
Montgomery (seat 1/1)	Whitshed Keene	
Montgomeryshire (seat 1/1)	William Mostyn Owen	
Morpeth (seat 1/2)	Anthony Morris Storer	
Morpeth (seat 2/2)	Peter Delmé	
== N ==
Nairnshire (seat 0/0)	Alternating seat with Cromartyshire. No representation in 1780	
Newark (seat 1/2)	Lord George Manners-Sutton – died Replaced by John Manners-Sutton 1783	
Newark (seat 2/2)	Henry Clinton	
Newcastle-under-Lyme (seat 1/2)	George Leveson-Gower, Viscount Trentham	
Newcastle-under-Lyme (seat 2/2)	Sir Archibald Macdonald	
Newcastle-upon-Tyne (seat 1/2)	Andrew Robinson Stoney-Bowes	
Newcastle-upon-Tyne (seat 2/2)	Sir Matthew White Ridley, Bt	
Newport (Cornwall) (seat 1/2)	Viscount Maitland	
Newport (Cornwall) (seat 2/2)	John Coghill	
Newport (Isle of Wight) (seat 1/2)	Sir Richard Worsley	
Newport (Isle of Wight) (seat 2/2)	Hon. John St. John	
New Radnor Boroughs (seat 1/1)	John Lewis – unseated on petition Replaced by Edward Lewis 1781	
New Romney (seat 1/2)	Sir Edward Dering, Bt	
New Romney (seat 2/2)	Richard Jackson	
New Shoreham (seat 1/2)	Sir Cecil Bisshopp	
New Shoreham (seat 2/2)	John Peachey	
Newton (Lancashire) (seat 1/2)	Thomas Peter Legh	
Newton (Lancashire) (seat 2/2)	Thomas Davenport, KC	
Newtown (Isle of Wight) (seat 1/2)	Edward Meux Worsley– died Replaced by Henry Dundas 1782 – resigned Replaced by Richard Pepper Arden 1783	
Newtown (Isle of Wight) (seat 2/2)	Sir John Barrington, Bt	
New Windsor (seat 1/2)	John Montagu	
New Windsor (seat 2/2)	Peniston Portlock Powney	
New Woodstock (seat 1/2)	Viscount Parker	
New Woodstock (seat 2/2)	William Eden	
Norfolk (seat 1/2)	Sir Edward Astley, Bt	
Norfolk (seat 2/2)	Thomas Coke	
Northallerton (seat 1/2)	Daniel Lascelles – resigned Replaced by Edwin Lascelles 1780	
Northallerton (seat 2/2)	Henry Peirse (younger)	
Northampton (seat 1/2)	Viscount Althorp – resigned Replaced by The Lord Lucan 1782	
Northampton (seat 2/2)	George Rodney	
Northamptonshire (seat 1/2)	Lucy Knightley	
Northamptonshire (seat 2/2)	Thomas Powys	
Northumberland (seat 1/2)	Lord Algernon Percy	
Northumberland (seat 2/2)	Sir William Middleton, Bt	
Norwich (seat 1/2)	Harbord Harbord	
Norwich (seat 2/2)	Edward Bacon	
Nottingham (seat 1/2)	Daniel Coke	
Nottingham (seat 2/2)	Robert Smith	
Nottinghamshire (seat 1/2)	Lord Edward Bentinck	
Nottinghamshire (seat 2/2)	Charles Medows (Charles Pierrepont)	
== O ==
Okehampton (seat 1/2)	Richard Vernon	
Okehampton (seat 2/2)	Humphrey Minchin	
Old Sarum (seat 1/2)	Pinckney Wilkinson – died Replaced by George Hardinge 1784	
Old Sarum (seat 2/2)	Thomas Pitt (the younger) – raised to the peerage Replaced by The Hon. John Villiers 1784	
Orford (seat 1/2)	Viscount Beauchamp	
Orford (seat 2/2)	Hon. Robert Seymour-Conway	
Orkney and Shetland (seat 1/1)	Robert Baikie – unseated on petition Replaced by Charles Dundas 1781	
Oxford (seat 1/2)	Lord Robert Spencer	
Oxford (seat 2/2)	Captain the Hon. Peregrine Bertie	
Oxfordshire (seat 1/2)	Lord Charles Spencer	Whig
Oxfordshire (seat 2/2)	Viscount Wenman	
Oxford University (seat 1/2)	Francis Page	
Oxford University (seat 2/2)	Sir William Dolben, Bt	
== P ==
Peeblesshire (seat 1/1)	Alexander Murray I – resigned Replaced by Alexander Murray II 1783	
Pembroke Boroughs (seat 1/1)	Hugh Owen III –	Whig
Pembrokeshire (seat 1/1)	Hugh Owen	
Penryn (seat 1/2)	Sir Francis Basset	
Penryn (seat 2/2)	John Rogers – took office Replaced by Reginald Pole Carew 1782	
Perth Burghs (seat 1/1)	George Dempster	
Perthshire (seat 1/1)	James Murray	
Peterborough (seat 1/2)	Richard Benyon	
Peterborough (seat 2/2)	James Farrel Phipps	Whig
Petersfield (seat 1/2)	William Jolliffe	
Petersfield (seat 2/2)	Thomas Samuel Jolliffe	
Plymouth (seat 1/2)	Sir Frederick Rogers	
Plymouth (seat 2/2)	Vice Admiral George Darby	
Plympton Erle (seat 1/2)	Viscount Cranborne – succeeded to peerage Replaced by Hon. James Stuart 1780	
Plympton Erle (seat 2/2)	Sir Ralph Payne	
Pontefract (seat 1/2)	William Nedham	
Pontefract (seat 2/2)	Viscount Galway – resigned Replaced by Nathaniel Smith 1783 – results reversed Replaced by John Smyth 1783	
Poole (seat 1/2)	Joseph Gulston	
Poole (seat 2/2)	William Morton Pitt	
Portsmouth (seat 1/2)	Hon. Robert Monckton – died Replaced by Sir Henry Fetherstonhaugh, Bt 1782	
Portsmouth (seat 2/2)	Sir William Gordon – pensioned Replaced by Hon. Thomas Erskine 1783	
Preston (seat 1/2)	John Burgoyne	
Preston (seat 2/2)	Sir Harry Hoghton, Bt	
== Q ==
Queenborough (seat 1/2)	Sir Charles Frederick	
Queenborough (seat 2/2)	Sir Walter Rawlinson	
== R ==
Radnorshire (seat 1/1)	Thomas Johnes	
Reading (seat 1/2)	John Dodd – died Replaced by Richard Aldworth-Neville 1782	
Reading (seat 2/2)	Francis Annesley	
Reigate (seat 1/2)	Charles Cocks	
Reigate (seat 2/2)	John Yorke	
Renfrewshire (seat 1/1)	John Shaw-Stewart – resigned Replaced by William Macdowall 1783	
Richmond (Yorkshire) (seat 1/2)	Marquess of Graham	
Richmond (Yorkshire) (seat 2/2)	Sir Lawrence Dundas, Bt – sat for Edinburgh; Replaced by George Fitzwilliam 1781	
Ripon (seat 1/2)	William Aislabie – died Replaced by William Lawrence 1781	
Ripon (seat 2/2)	Frederick Robinson	
Rochester (seat 1/2)	George Finch-Hatton	
Rochester (seat 2/2)	Robert Gregory	
Ross-shire (seat 1/1)	John Mackenzie	
Roxburghshire (seat 1/1)	Sir Gilbert Elliot	
Rutland (seat 1/2)	Thomas Noel	
Rutland (seat 2/2)	George Bridges Brudenell	
Rye (seat 1/2)	Hon. Thomas Onslow	
Rye (seat 2/2)	William Dickinson	
== S ==
St Albans (seat 1/2)	William Charles Sloper	
St Albans (seat 2/2)	John Radcliffe – died Replaced by The Viscount Grimston 1783	
St Germans (seat 1/2)	Edward James Eliot	
St Germans (seat 2/2)	Dudley Long	
St Ives (seat 1/2)	William Praed	
St Ives (seat 2/2)	Abel Smith	
St Mawes (seat 1/2)	Viscount Clare	
St Mawes (seat 2/2)	Hugh Boscawen	
Salisbury (seat 1/2)	Hon. William Henry Bouverie	
Salisbury (seat 2/2)	William Hussey	
Saltash (seat 1/2)	Grey Cooper	
Saltash (seat 2/2)	Charles Jenkinson	
Sandwich (seat 1/2)	Philip Stephens	
Sandwich (seat 2/2)	Sir Richard Sutton	
Scarborough (seat 1/2)	Earl of Tyrconnell	
Scarborough (seat 2/2)	Charles Phipps	
Seaford (seat 1/2)	John Durand	
Seaford (seat 2/2)	John Robinson – sat for Harwich; Replaced by Christopher D'Oyly 1780	
Selkirkshire (seat 1/1)	John Pringle	
Shaftesbury (seat 1/2)	Sir Thomas Rumbold – unseated on petition Replaced by Hans Winthrop Mortimer 1781	
Shaftesbury (seat 2/2)	Sir Francis Sykes	
Shrewsbury (seat 1/2)	William Pulteney	
Shrewsbury (seat 2/2)	Sir Charlton Leighton	
Shropshire (seat 1/2)	Noel Hill	
Shropshire (seat 2/2)	Sir Richard Hill	
Somerset (seat 1/2)	Sir John Trevelyan, Bt	
Somerset (seat 2/2)	Richard Hippisley Coxe	
Southampton (seat 1/2)	John Fuller	
Southampton (seat 2/2)	Hans Sloane	
Southwark (seat 1/2)	Nathaniel Polhill – died Replaced by Henry Thornton 1782	
Southwark (seat 2/2)	Sir Richard Hotham	
Stafford (seat 1/2)	Edward Monckton	
Stafford (seat 2/2)	Richard Brinsley Sheridan	
Staffordshire (seat 1/2)	Viscount Lewisham	
Staffordshire (seat 2/2)	Captain (Sir) John Wrottesley	
Stamford (seat 1/2)	Sir George Howard	
Stamford (seat 2/2)	Henry Cecil	
Steyning (seat 1/2)	Sir Thomas Skipwith	
Steyning (seat 2/2)	Filmer Honywood – sat for Kent; Replaced by Colonel John Bullock 1780	
Stirling Burghs (seat 1/1)	James Campbell	
Stirlingshire (seat 1/1)	Sir Thomas Dundas	Pro-Admin Whig
Stockbridge (seat 1/2)	Lieutenant the Hon. James Luttrell	
Stockbridge (seat 2/2)	Captain the Hon. John Luttrell	
Sudbury (seat 1/2)	Sir Patrick Blake, Bt	
Sudbury (seat 2/2)	Philip Champion Crespigny – unseated on petition Replaced by Sir James Marriott 1781	
Suffolk (seat 1/2)	Sir Charles Bunbury, Bt	
Suffolk (seat 2/2)	Sir John Rous, Bt	
Surrey (seat 1/2)	Admiral the Hon. Augustus Keppel – ennobled Replaced by Viscount Althorp 1782 –succeeded to peerage Replaced by Sir Robert Clayton 1783	
Surrey (seat 2/2)	Sir Joseph Mawbey, Bt	
Sussex (seat 1/2)	Thomas Pelham	
Sussex (seat 2/2)	Lord George Henry Lennox	
Sutherland (seat 1/1)	James Wemyss	
== T ==
Tain Burghs (seat 1/1)	Charles Ross	
Tamworth (seat 1/2)	John Courtenay	
Tamworth (seat 2/2)	Anthony Chamier – died Replaced by John Calvert 1780	
Taunton (seat 1/2)	John Halliday	
Taunton (seat 2/2)	Major-General John Roberts – died Replaced by (Sir) Benjamin Hammet 1782	
Tavistock (seat 1/2)	Richard Rigby	Whig
Tavistock (seat 2/2)	Hon. Richard Fitzpatrick	
Tewkesbury (seat 1/2)	James Martin	
Tewkesbury (seat 2/2)	Sir William Codrington, Bt	
Thetford (seat 1/2)	Richard Hopkins	
Thetford (seat 2/2)	Charles FitzRoy-Scudamore – resigned Replaced by Earl of Euston 1782	
Thirsk (seat 1/2)	Sir Thomas Gascoigne	
Thirsk (seat 2/2)	Beilby Thompson	
Tiverton (seat 1/2)	John Eardley Wilmot	
Tiverton (seat 2/2)	John Duntze	
Totnes (seat 1/2)	Philip Jennings	
Totnes (seat 2/2)	Launcelot Brown	
Tregony (seat 1/2)	John Stephenson	
Tregony (seat 2/2)	John Dawes	
Truro (seat 1/2)	Henry Rosewarne – died Replaced by John Pollexfen Bastard 1783 – resigned Replaced by Sir John St Aubyn, Bt 1784	
Truro (seat 2/2)	Bamber Gascoyne	
== W ==
Wallingford (seat 1/2)	Chaloner Arcedeckne	
Wallingford (seat 2/2)	John Aubrey	
Wareham (seat 1/2)	John Boyd	
Wareham (seat 2/2)	Thomas Farrer	
Warwick (seat 1/2)	Hon. Charles Greville	
Warwick (seat 2/2)	Robert Ladbroke	
Warwickshire (seat 1/2)	Sir Robert Lawley, Bt	
Warwickshire (seat 2/2)	Sir George Shuckburgh, Bt	
Wells (seat 1/2)	Robert Child – died Replaced by John Curtis 1782	
Wells (seat 2/2)	Clement Tudway	
Wendover (seat 1/2)	Richard Smith	
Wendover (seat 2/2)	John Mansell Smith	
Wenlock (seat 1/2)	Sir Henry Bridgeman	
Wenlock (seat 2/2)	Thomas Whitmore – sat for Bridgnorth; Replaced by George Forester 1780	
Weobley (seat 1/2)	Andrew Bayntun-Rolt	
Weobley (seat 2/2)	John St Leger Douglas – died Vacated seat and replaced by (Sir) John Scott 1783	
Westbury (seat 1/2)	(Sir) John Whalley-Gardiner	
Westbury (seat 2/2)	Samuel Estwick	
West Looe (seat 1/2)	Sir William James – died Replaced by John Buller 1784	
West Looe (seat 2/2)	John Buller – resigned Replaced by John Somers Cocks 1782	
Westminster (seat 1/2)	George Brydges Rodney – ennobled Replaced by Sir Cecil Wray, Bt 1782	
Westminster (seat 2/2)	Charles James Fox	
Westmorland (seat 1/2)	James Lowther	
Westmorland (seat 2/2)	Sir Michael le Fleming	
Weymouth and Melcombe Regis (seat 1/4)	Welbore Ellis	
Weymouth and Melcombe Regis (seat 2/4)	William Chaffin Grove – resigned Replaced by William Richard Rumbold 1781	
Weymouth and Melcombe Regis (seat 3/4)	John Purling	
Weymouth and Melcombe Regis (seat 4/4)	Warren Lisle – resigned as ineligible Replaced by Gabriel Steward 1780	
Whitchurch (seat 1/2)	The Viscount Midleton	Whig
Whitchurch (seat 2/2)	Thomas Townshend – ennobled Replaced by William Selwyn 1783	
Wigan (seat 1/2)	Hon. Horatio Walpole	
Wigan (seat 2/2)	Henry Simpson Bridgeman – died Replaced by John Cotes 1782	
Wigtown Burghs (seat 1/1)	William Adam	
Wigtownshire (seat 1/1)	Keith Stewart	
Wilton (seat 1/2)	Lord Herbert	
Wilton (seat 2/2)	William Gerard Hamilton	
Wiltshire (seat 1/2)	Charles Penruddocke	
Wiltshire (seat 2/2)	Ambrose Goddard	
Winchelsea (seat 1/2)	Charles Wolfran Cornwall	
Winchelsea (seat 2/2)	John Nesbitt	
Winchester (seat 1/2)	Henry Penton	
Winchester (seat 2/2)	Lovell Stanhope – died Replaced by Henry Flood 1783	
Wootton Bassett (seat 1/2)	Hon. Henry St John	
Wootton Bassett (seat 2/2)	William Strahan	
Worcester (seat 1/2)	William Ward	
Worcester (seat 2/2)	Thomas Bates Rous	
Worcestershire (seat 1/2)	Edward Foley	
Worcestershire (seat 2/2)	William Lygon	
== Y ==
Yarmouth (Isle of Wight) (seat 1/2)	Edward Morant	
Yarmouth (Isle of Wight) (seat 2/2)	Edward Rushworth – resigned Replaced by Sir Thomas Rumbold 1781	
York (seat 1/2)	Charles Turner – died Replaced by The Viscount Galway 1783	
York (seat 2/2)	Lord John Cavendish	
Yorkshire (seat 1/2)	Henry Duncombe	
Yorkshire (seat 2/2)	Sir George Savile – resigned Replaced by Francis Ferrand Folijambe 1784	

== By-elections ==
- List of Great Britain by-elections (1774–90)

== See also ==
- 1780 British general election
- List of parliaments of Great Britain
- Unreformed House of Commons
