= John Robinson (Harwich MP) =

English lawyer, politician, and government official (1727–1802)

John Robinson (1727–1802) was an English lawyer, politician and government official.

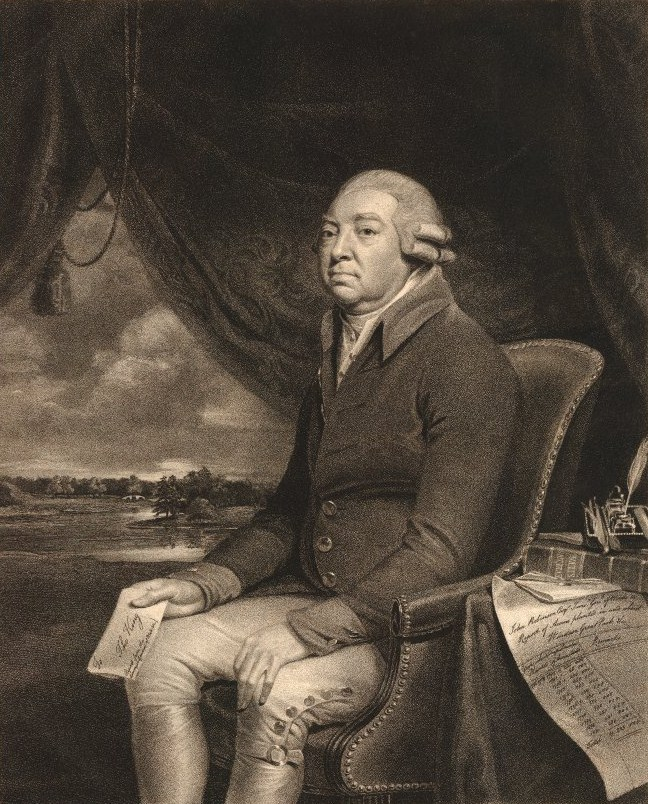
John Robinson, engraving by William Bond after George Francis Joseph

He was a treasury secretary of obscure origin, characterized by extraordinary diligence, efficiency, persistence, and deep conservatism.

== Life ==
Born on 15 July 1727, and baptised at St. Lawrence, Appleby, Westmorland, on 14 August 1727, he was the eldest son of Charles Robinson, an Appleby tradesman, who died on 19 June 1760, in his fifty-eighth year, having married, at Kirkby Thore on 19 May 1726, Hannah, daughter of Richard Deane of Appleby. He was educated until 17 at Appleby grammar school, and was then articled to his aunt's husband, Richard Wordsworth, of Sockbridge in Barton, Westmorland, clerk of the peace for the county, and grandfather of the poet William Wordsworth. He was admitted as attorney, practised law in Appleby, and became town clerk on 1 October 1750; he was mayor in 1761. On 2 February 1759 he entered Gray's Inn.

Robinson acquired property and local influence, by marriage and inheritance, and Sir James Lowther made him his principal law agent and land steward. He was created a magistrate and deputy-lieutenant of Westmorland in 1762, and through the influence of Lowther was returned as Member of Parliament for Westmorland on 5 January 1764, continuing to represent it until the dissolution in September 1774.

In 1765 Robinson rebuilt the White House, Appleby, and entertained Lord North the prime minister there. He was created secretary of the treasury by North on 6 February 1770. A quarrel with Lowther blew up in early 1773, over local patronage; it saw a challenge to a duel, which Robinson turned down. Robinson resigned the post of law agent to the Lowther estates, and was succeeded in it by his first cousin, John Wordsworth, the poet's father.

Robinson held the secretaryship of the treasury until 1782. He found another seat in parliament, the safe government borough of Harwich, which he represented from October 1774 until his death. In 1780 he was also returned for Seaford, but preferred his old constituency. While in office he was the chief ministerial agent in carrying on the business of parliament, and he was the medium of communication between the ministry and its supporters. The whig satires of the day, such as the Rolliad and the Probationary Odes regularly attacked him, as did Junius and Richard Brinsley Sheridan, when attacking bribery: those whom he seduced from the opposition were known as "Robinson's rats". He brought, on 3 July 1777 an action against Henry Sampson Woodfall, printer of the Public Advertiser for libel, in accusing him of sharing in government contracts, and obtained a verdict of forty shillings and costs.

Robinson declined to back the Fox–North Coalition. On his retirement from the post of secretary of the treasury, he came into a pension of £1,000 a year. After their quarrel Robinson offered his estates in Westmorland (including burgage tenures in Appleby) to Lowther, who didn't want them, and sold nearly the whole property for £29,000 to Sackville Tufton, 8th Earl of Thanet, who thus acquired an interest in the parliamentary representation.

About 1778 Robinson purchased a property in Middlesex from Peter William Baker, Wyke Manor at Syon Hill, Isleworth, between Brentford and Osterley Park. There he modernised what became Wyke House, and added a dining room by Robert Adam (1778–79). The rest of the house was rebuilt shortly afterwards.

Robinson was created a D.C.L. of Oxford on 9 July 1773; he declined a peerage in 1784, but in December 1787 William Pitt the Younger appointed him surveyor-general of woods and forests. A favourite of George III, he planted at Windsor millions of acorns and 20,000 oak trees. In 1794 he printed a letter to Sir John Sinclair, chairman of the Board of Agriculture, on enclosures.

== Death ==
Robinson had a paralytic stroke in 1782, and he died of apoplexy at Harwich, on 23 December 1802. He was buried at Isleworth on 2 January 1803.

== Family ==
In 1759 Robinson married Mary Crowe, said to have been daughter of Nathaniel Crowe, a wealthy merchant and planter in Barbados, obtaining with her a fortune. He also inherited from his grandfather, John Robinson, alderman of Appleby 1703–46, property in the county, and eighteen burgage tenures, carrying votes for the borough, in Appleby.

His wife died at Wyke House on 8 June 1805, aged 71, and was buried at Isleworth on 5 June. Their only child Mary Robinson was baptised at St. Lawrence Church, Appleby, on 24 March 1759, and married, at Isleworth on 3 October 1781, the Hon. Henry Neville. She died of consumption at Hotwells, Bristol, on 26 October 1796, and was buried in Isleworth churchyard, where a monument was erected to her memory. Her home was at Wyke House, and all her children were born there.

== Legacy ==
By his will Robinson left legacies to Captain John Wordsworth and Richard Wordsworth of Staple Inn, London. His means were comparatively small. After his death his accounts were called for, and it was some time before they were passed, and the embargo placed by the crown on the transfer of his Isleworth property to George Villiers, 4th Earl of Jersey removed. Robinson was benefactor to Isleworth, Appleby, and Harwich, leaving books to the grammar schools in the last two towns.

Robinson's correspondence and official papers, including many communications from George III, went to the Marquis of Abergavenny at Eridge Castle. The substance of part of them was described in the 10th Report of the Historical Manuscripts Commission. Excerpts from the whole collections were edited by Benjamin Franklin Stevens for the Royal Historical Society.

Wyke House in the 19th century became a school, run by Alexander Jamieson, and then a private lunatic asylum. One of the proprietors was William Birmingham Costello; later physicians there were John Stevenson Bushnan and then Robert Gardiner Hill. Hill parted company with his partner Edmund Sparke Willett in 1860; Willett was listed as proprietor in 1874. It was still in use as a mental hospital in 1958. In 1970 it was being used for mental health rehabilitation, and was Grade II listed. The house was demolished in 1977 or 1978, after an enquiry; where it once stood is now Wyke Close.

== Attribution ==
This article incorporates text from a publication now in the public domain: Lee, Sidney, ed. (1897). "Robinson, John (1727-1802)". Dictionary of National Biography. Vol. 49. London: Smith, Elder & Co.

Parliament of Great Britain
Preceded by Robert Lowther; John Upton	Member of Parliament for Westmorland; 1764–1774; With: John Upton to 1768; Thomas Fenwick from 1768	Succeeded by Sir Michael le Fleming, Bt; Sir James Lowther
Preceded by George Medley; The Viscount Gage	Member of Parliament for Seaford; 1780; With: John Durand	Succeeded by John Durand; Christopher D'Oyly
Preceded by Charles Jenkinson; Edward Harvey	Member of Parliament for Harwich; 1774–1800; With: Edward Harvey to 1778; George Augustus North 1778–1784; Thomas Orde 1784–1796; Richard Hopkins 1796–1799; Henry Dillon-Lee from 1799; Thomas Myers	Succeeded by Parliament of the United Kingdom
Parliament of the United Kingdom
Preceded by Parliament of Great Britain	Member of Parliament for Harwich; 1801–1803; With: Henry Dillon-Lee to 1802; Thomas Myers from 1802	Succeeded by Thomas Myers; John Hiley Addington
