= Thomas Potter (1740–1801) =

British lawyer and politician

Thomas Potter (1740–1801) was a British lawyer and politician who sat in the House of Commons from 1776 to 1780.

Potter was the only son of Thomas Potter and his first wife Anne Manningham, daughter of Rev. Thomas Manningham, rector of Slinfold, Sussex. He was educated at Eton College from 1753 to 1754 and was admitted at Emmanuel College, Cambridge on 14 October 1756. He was admitted at Lincoln's Inn on 13 May 1767 and called to the bar on 2 July 1772. He married Miss Grove, of Ridgmont, Bedfordshire on 6 May 1761.

Potter was returned unopposed as Member of Parliament for Lostwithiel as an Administration candidate on Lord Edgcumbe's interest at a by-election on 28 November 1776. In 1778 he was appointed Second justice of Anglesey, a post he held until his death. He does not appear to have spoken in Parliament. He did not stand again at the 1780 general election.

Potter became a Fellow of the Society of Antiquaries and Fellow of the Royal Society in 1784. He died in Harley Street on 14 November 1801.

Parliament of Great Britain
Preceded by Viscount Fairford; Charles Brett	Member of Parliament for Lostwithiel; 1776–1780; With: Viscount Fairford	Succeeded by Hon. John St. John; Hon. Thomas de Grey
