= John Buller (politician, born 1721) =

British politician (1721–1786)

John Buller (1721–1786) was a British politician who sat in the House of Commons for 39 years from 1747 to 1786.

== Early life and career ==
Buller was the son of John Francis Buller, M.P. and his wife Rebecca Trelawny, daughter of Sir Jonathan Trelawny, 3rd Baronet bishop of Winchester and was born on 24 Jan. 1721. He matriculated at Balliol College, Oxford on 25 October 1738. He entered Middle Temple in 1740 and Inner Temple in 1743 and was called to the bar in February 1747. In 1746 he was mayor of East Looe and in the 1747 general election he was returned as Member of Parliament for East Looe.

In 1754 Buller was re-elected MP for East Looe and in the same year was appointed Comptroller of the Mint. He was also mayor of East Looe again and appointed Recorder of East Looe in 1754. From 1759 to 1761 he was secretary to the Chancellor of the Exchequer. He married Mary St Aubyn, daughter of Sir John St Aubyn, 3rd Baronet on 3 March 1760.

Buller was re-elected MP for East Looe in 1761. He was mayor of West Looe by mandamus in 1763, and 1764. In July 1765 he was Lord of the Admiralty, a post he held until September 1780. He was re-elected MP for East Looe in 1768. Following the death of his first wife in August 1767, he remarried to Elizabeth Caroline Hunter, daughter of John Hunter on 4 November 1768. He was again mayor of East Looe in 1772 and in the same year became auditor of the Duchy of Cornwall. He was returned again as MP for East Looe in 1774 and 1780 . He was Lord of the Treasury from September 1780 to March 1782 and again in December 1783. He was lastly returned as MP for East Looe in 1784.

== Death ==
Buller died on 26 July 1786.

Parliament of Great Britain
Preceded by Francis Gashry; James Buller	Member of Parliament for East Looe; 1747 –1786; With: Francis Gashry 1747-1762; The Viscount Palmerston 1762-1768; Richard Hussey 1768-1770; Richard Leigh 1770-1772; John Purling 1772 -1775; Sir Charles Whitworth 1775; Thomas Graves 1775-1783; John James Hamilton 1783-1784; William Graves 1784-1786; Alexander Irvine 1786	Succeeded by Alexander Irvine; Richard Grosvenor
