= John Durand (MP, died 1788) =

British politician

John Durand (c. 1719 – 1788), of Woodcote Lodge, Carshalton, Surrey, was an English politician who sat in the House of Commons between 1768 and 1784.

He served as a ship's captain for the East India Company and afterwards set up as a London merchant. He was made High Sheriff of Surrey for 1767–68.

He was a Member (MP) of the Parliament of Great Britain for Aylesbury 1768–1774, Plympton Erle 7 Feb. 1775–1780 and for Seaford 1780.

Parliament of Great Britain
Preceded by Welbore Ellis; Anthony Bacon	Member of Parliament for Aylesbury; 1768–1774; With: Anthony Bacon	Succeeded by Anthony Bacon; John Aubrey
Preceded by Paul Henry Ourry; Sir Richard Philipps, Bt	Member of Parliament for Plympton Erle; 1775–1780; With: Sir Richard Philipps, Bt to 1779; William Fullarton from 1779	Succeeded by Viscount Cranborne; Sir Ralph Payne
Preceded by The Viscount Gage; George Medley	Member of Parliament for Seaford; 1780–1784; With: John Robinson; Christopher D'Oyly	Succeeded by Sir Peter Parker, Bt; Henry Nevill
