= Peter William Baker =

English politician (1756–1815)

Member of Parliament for Corfe Castle
- In office 1807 – 25 August 1815 Serving with Henry Bankes
- Preceded by: Nathaniel Bond
- Succeeded by: George Bankes

Member of Parliament for Wootton Bassett
- In office 18 December 1802 – 1806
- Preceded by: Henry St John
- Succeeded by: Robert Knight

Member of Parliament for Arundel
- In office 26 March 1781 – 1784
- Preceded by: Patrick Crauford
- Succeeded by: Charles Howard

Personal details
- Born: 1756
- Died: 25 August 1815 (aged 58–59)
- Party: Tory
- Education: Eton College
- Alma mater: Trinity College, Cambridge

Peter William Baker (1756 – 25 August 1815) was an English politician who was Member of Parliament for Corfe Castle, Wootton Bassett and Arundel.

He was High Sheriff of Dorset from 1787 to 1788.

== See also ==
- List of MPs elected in the 1780 British general election
- List of MPs elected in the 1802 United Kingdom general election
- List of MPs elected in the 1807 United Kingdom general election
- List of MPs elected in the 1812 United Kingdom general election
