= William Gordon (diplomat) =

British diplomat and politician

Sir William Gordon (1726–1798) was a British diplomat and politician who sat in the House of Commons from 1777 to 1783.

== Early life ==
Gordon was the eldest of William Gordon, a merchant and planter of St Mary's, Kingston, Jamaica, and his wife Susanna Gordon. He was educated at Glasgow University from 1739 to 1745 and at Leyden University from 1745 to 1746. He undertook a Grand Tour with William Dowdeswell from 1746. After his father died, he passed the plantations and mercantile business in the West Indies to his brothers, and settled in London.

== Career ==
Lord Sandwich appointed Gordon as Minister to the Diet at Ratisbon in April in 1764 and then envoy to Denmark on 28 June 1765. However he never took up the post and was instead Minister at Brussels from November 1765 to 1777. He was created Knight of the Bath on 3 February 1775. He married Mary Phillipps, widow of Samuel Phillipps of Garendon Park, and daughter of Thomas Allsopp of Ashbourne, Derbyshire on 2 July 1776.

Gordon decided to seek a seat in Parliament and when one fell vacant at Portsmouth in 1777, he resigned his post in Brussels. At a by-election on 26 November 1777 he was returned as Member of Parliament for Portsmouth. He held the seat in the 1780 general election. In September 1780 he was appointed Clerk of the Green Cloth and held the post until it was abolished in March 1782. He vacated his seat in Parliament in July 1783 in exchange for a large government pension.

== Later life ==
Gordon died on 26 Jan. 1798.

Parliament of Great Britain
Preceded by Maurice Suckling; Peter Taylor	Member of Parliament for Portsmouth; 1777–1783; With: Maurice Suckling; Hon. Robert Monckton; Sir Henry Fetherstonhaugh, Bt	Succeeded by Sir Henry Fetherstonhaugh, Bt; Hon. Thomas Erskine
Diplomatic posts
Preceded by Philip Stanhope	British envoy to the Imperial Diet at Ratisbon; 1764–1765	Succeeded by Fulke Greville
Preceded by Sir James Porter FRS	British Minister in Brussels; 1765–1777	Succeeded by Alleyne FitzHerbert
