= David Michel =

Member of Parliament of the UK

David Robert Michel (c.1735–1805) was the member of the Parliament of the United Kingdom for Lyme Regis for the parliament of 12 December 1780 to 1784.
