= Charles Brett (politician) =

British Member of Parliament

Charles Brett (c. 1715 – 10 February 1799) was a Royal Navy officer and politician who sat in the House of Commons between 1768 and 1790.

== Early life ==
Brett was probably the son of Captain Timothy Brett, RN. He was at first a naval officer, and in 1755 was in charge of Portsmouth dockyard. After inheriting property on his marriage to Elizabeth Hooker, granddaughter and heir of Sir William Hooker in 1753, he retired from the navy and eventually went into politics.

== Political career ==
A follower of Lord Howe, Brett was Paymaster of the Navy from 1766 to 1770. He entered Parliament in 1768 as member of parliament for Lostwithiel. He resigned that seat in 1776, to be returned instead as the government-sponsored MP for Sandwich, a constituency with a strong naval connection. From 1777 he voted consistently with the opposition, and in 1780 lost his seat when defeated by two government-backed candidates.

After the fall of Lord North's government in 1782, Brett was appointed a Lord of the Admiralty, and returned to the Commons as the Rockingham government's candidate at Dartmouth (another constituency with strong links with the navy) at a by-election on 16 April 1782. He was a Lord of the Admiralty from April 1782 to April 1783, leaving office on the fall of Shelburne's administration, and once again under William Pitt the Younger from December 1783 until 1788. In 1784 he was returned unopposed as MP for Sandwich again. He did not stand in 1790.

== Later life and legacy ==
Brett died on 10 February 1799, "far advanced in years". He and his wife Elizabeth had no children and he left his property to his nephew John, son of his brother John Brett.

Parliament of Great Britain
Preceded by Viscount Beauchamp; James Edward Colleton	Member of Parliament for Lostwithiel; 1768–1776; With: Sir Henry Cavendish 1768–1774; Viscount Fairford 1774–1776	Succeeded by Viscount Fairford; Thomas Potter
Preceded by Philip Stephens; William Hey	Member of Parliament for Sandwich; 1776–1780; With: Philip Stephens	Succeeded by Philip Stephens; Sir Richard Sutton
Preceded by Arthur Holdsworth; The Viscount Howe	Member of Parliament for Dartmouth; 1782–1784; With: Arthur Holdsworth	Succeeded by Arthur Holdsworth; Richard Hopkins
Preceded by Philip Stephens; Sir Richard Sutton	Member of Parliament for Sandwich; 1784 –1790; With: Philip Stephens	Succeeded by Philip Stephens; Sir Horatio Mann
