= George Fitzwilliam =

George Fitzwilliam (28 February 1756 – 6 May 1786) was a British Member of Parliament.

== Biography ==
Fitzwilliam was the younger son of William Fitzwilliam, 3rd Earl Fitzwilliam, by his wife Anne, sister of Charles Watson-Wentworth, 2nd Marquess of Rockingham. (Note: The History of Parliament website entry for George Fitzwilliam specifies his birth date as 28 February 1757 and declares that he was born posthumously. However, the Register of Births & Baptisms in the Parish of St James has a baptismal date of 11 March 1756 and a birth date of 28 February 1756.) He was educated at Eton and Trinity Hall, Cambridge and served in the 1st Troop, Horse Grenadier Guards. His brother William Fitzwilliam, 4th Earl Fitzwilliam suggested him as a candidate for Grimsby at the general election in 1780, but his uncle Rockingham refused to contribute to the costs. Instead he replaced Sir Lawrence Dundas in a by-election at Richmond (Fitzwilliam's sister Charlotte was married to Dundas's son Thomas). In the House of Commons he voted against parliamentary reform in May 1783, and as a result his brother Lord Fitzwilliam was dissuaded from nominating him for York at a by-election later that year and at the general election in 1784, when he left the House. There is no record of his having spoken in Parliament. He died, unmarried, two years later.
