= Lord John Pelham-Clinton =

British politician

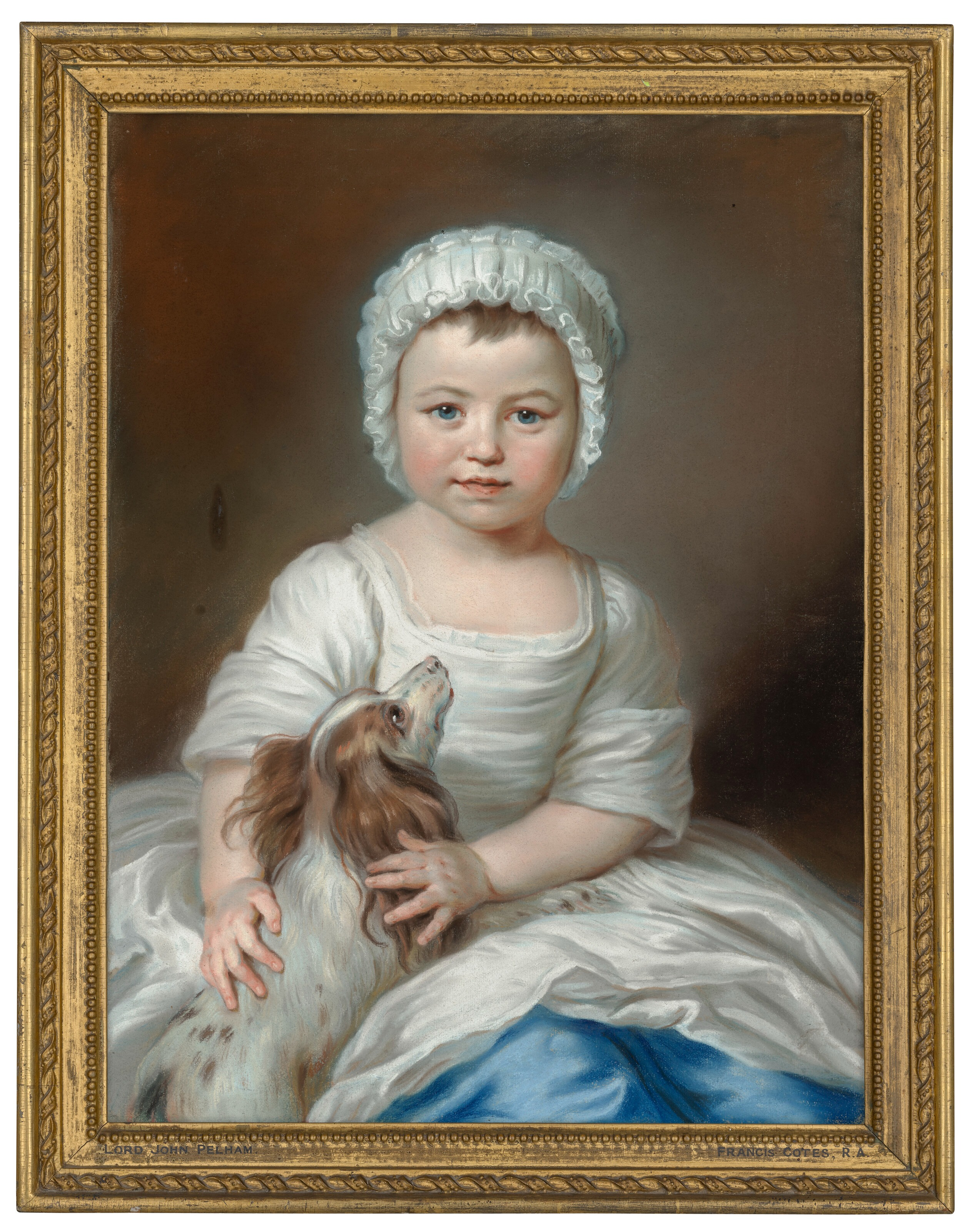
- childhood portrait by William Hoare
- Born: 13 September 1755
- Died: 10 November 1781 (aged 26); Lisbon
- Alma mater: Eton College; King's College
- Occupation: Politician
- Parent(s): Henry Pelham-Clinton; Catherine Pelham

Lord John Pelham-Clinton (1755–1781) was a British politician who sat in the House of Commons from 1778 to 1781.

Pelham-Clinton was the third son of Henry Pelham-Clinton, 2nd Duke of Newcastle and was born on 13 September 1755. He was educated at Eton College from 1763 to 1770, and was admitted at King's College, Cambridge in 1772. He undertook a Grand Tour from 1776 to 1778.

Pelham-Clinton's father, the Duke of Newcastle, had an interest in the seat of East Retford and in 1778 was able to make it available for his son. Pelham Clinton was returned unopposed at a by-election on 24 February 1778 as Member of Parliament for East Retford, although he was still in Vienna at the time. He was returned again at the 1780 general election. In 1780, he was given the position of Gentleman of the bedchamber to the Prince of Wales under the family submission to Lord North, which he had to present himself since his father was unwell. He does not appear to have spoken in Parliament.

Pelham-Clinton suffered from ill-health and in October 1781 went to Portugal, He died unmarried at Lisbon on 10 November 1781.

Parliament of Great Britain
Preceded by Sir Cecil Wray; William Hanger	Member of Parliament for East Retford; 1778–1781; With: Sir Cecil Wray; Wharton Amcotts	Succeeded by Wharton Amcotts; Thomas Pelham-Clinton
