= Thomas Pelham-Clinton, 3rd Duke of Newcastle =

British Army officer and politician

Major-General His Grace The Duke of Newcastle

3rd Duke of Newcastle-under-Lyne
- In office 1794–1795
- Preceded by: Henry Pelham-Clinton, 2nd Duke of Newcastle-under-Lyne
- Succeeded by: Henry Pelham-Clinton, 4th Duke of Newcastle-under-Lyne

Member of the British Parliament for Westminster
- In office 1774–1780

Member of the British Parliament for East Retford
- In office 1781–1794

Lord Lieutenant of Nottinghamshire
- In office 1794–1795

Personal details
- Born: 1 July 1752
- Died: 18 May 1795 (aged 42)
- Spouse: Anna Maria Stanhope
- Children: 4, including Henry

Military service
- Branch/service: British Army
- Rank: Major-General

Major-General Thomas Pelham-Clinton, 3rd Duke of Newcastle-under-Lyne (1 July 1752 – 18 May 1795), known as Lord Thomas Pelham-Clinton until 1779 and as Earl of Lincoln from 1779 to 1794, was a British Army officer and politician who sat in the House of Commons between 1774 and 1794 when he succeeded to the peerage as Duke of Newcastle.

Born on 1 July and christened on 28 July 1752 at St Margaret's, Westminster, Pelham-Clinton was the second but eldest surviving son of Henry Pelham-Clinton, 2nd Duke of Newcastle-under-Lyne, and his wife Lady Catherine Pelham, daughter of Henry Pelham. After his education, he embarked on a military career. In April 1774, he accompanied General Henry Lloyd, General Henry Clinton and Major Thomas Carleton as "English observers" of the Second Russo-Turkish War on the Danube (Speelman, 2002). He served in America during the American War of Independence as Aide-de-Camp to his relative, General Sir Henry Clinton, and was later aide-de-camp to the King. He achieved the rank of Major-General in 1787.

Pelham-Clinton also sat as Member of Parliament for Westminster from 1774 to 1780 and for East Retford from 1781 to 1794 and was Lord Lieutenant of Nottinghamshire from 1794 to 1795. In February 1794 he succeeded his father in the dukedom.

Pelham-Clinton married Lady Anna Maria Stanhope, daughter of William Stanhope, 2nd Earl of Harrington, in May 1782. They had two sons and two daughters. He died, at his country seat at Sunninghill in Berkshire, in May 1795, aged 42, from the effects of an emetic which he had taken for whooping cough, having held the dukedom for only a year. He was succeeded by his eldest son Henry. The Duchess of Newcastle-under-Lyne later married General Sir Charles Gregan Craufurd and died in 1834.

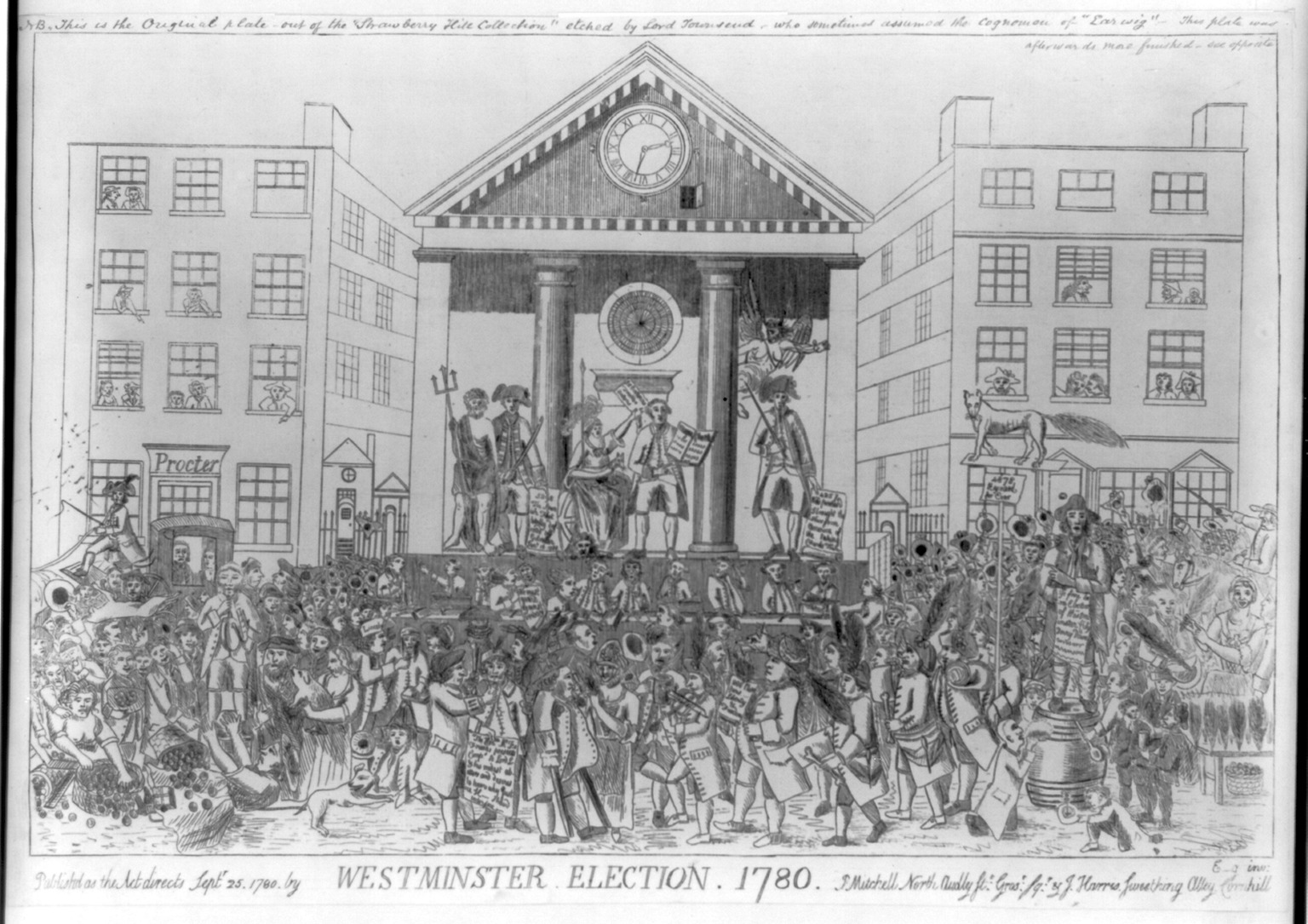
Print shows Lord Lincoln standing on the right of St. Paul's portico, Charles James Fox standing in the centre with Britannia and the British lion, and on the left, James Young, acting as a proxy for Admiral Rodney, with Neptune, during the Westminster election of 1780

Coat of arms of Thomas Pelham-Clinton, 3rd Duke of Newcastle
Coronet A coronet of an Duke Crest 1st, out of a ducal coronet gules, a plume of five ostrich feathers argent, banded azure ; 2nd, a peacock in pride proper. Escutcheon Quarterly: 1st and 4th argent, six cross crosslets, three, two and one, sable, on a chief azure two mullets pierced gules (Clinton); 2nd and 3rd, quarterly, 1st and 4th azure, three pelicans vulning themselves argent; and 2nd and 3rd gules, two pieces of belts with buckles erect in pale, the buckles upwards argent (Pelham). Supporters Two greyhounds argent collared and lined gules. Motto Loyaulté n'a honte Loyalty knows not shame

Parliament of Great Britain
Preceded by Lord Warkworth; Sir Robert Bernard, Bt	Member of Parliament for Westminster with Lord Warkworth 1774–1776; Viscount Petersham 1776–1779; Viscount Malden 1779–1780; 1774–1780	Succeeded by Sir George Brydges Rodney; Charles James Fox
Preceded by Lord John Pelham-Clinton; Wharton Amcotts	Member of Parliament for East Retford with Wharton Amcotts 1781–1790; Sir John Ingilby, Bt 1781–1794; 1781–1784	Succeeded by Sir John Ingilby, Bt; William Henry Clinton
Military offices
Preceded by George Morrison	Colonel of the 75th Regiment of Foot (Prince of Wales's Regiment); 1782–1783	Succeeded by Regiment disbanded
Preceded by Thomas Gage	Colonel of the 17th Regiment of (Light) Dragoons; 1785–1795	Succeeded by Oliver de Lancey
Honorary titles
Preceded by The Duke of Newcastle-under-Lyne	Lord Lieutenant of Nottinghamshire; 1794–1795	Succeeded by The Duke of Portland
Peerage of Great Britain
Preceded by Henry Pelham-Clinton	Duke of Newcastle-under-Lyne; 1794–1795	Succeeded by Henry Pelham-Clinton
