= Arnoldus Jones Skelton =

Arnoldus Jones Skelton (c. 1750 – 1793), of Branthwaite, Cumbria, was an English Member of Parliament.

He was a Member (MP) of the Parliament of Great Britain for Eye 1780 to March 1782.

He was the son of James Jones and Jemima nee Tullekens. His sister, Jemima Jones, married Charles, 2nd Earl Cornwallis.
