= Laurence Cox =

English politician

Sir Laurence Cox (died 26 August 1792) was an English politician from Woolcombe, Dorset.

Originally a merchant from London, Cox was a member (MP) of the parliament of Great Britain for Honiton from 1774 to 1780 and for Bere Alston from 14 February 1781 to 1784.

He was knighted in 1786.
