= Henry Howorth (barrister) =

English barrister and Member of Parliament

Henry Howorth (ca. 1746-11 May 1783) was an English barrister and Member of Parliament (MP).

The father of Henry Howorth was a cleric, Henry Robert Howorth, of Maesllwch in Radnorshire and his great-uncle was Humphrey Howorth. He attended Westminster School, was admitted to Lincoln's Inn in October 1764 and called to the Bar in May 1769. In 1780, Howorth was appointed recorder at Abingdon, Berkshire, and was also appointed King's Counsel.

He was elected to House of Commons from the Abingdon constituency in 1782. A keen sailor, he drowned on 11 May 1783 in the River Thames near his house at Mortlake. He had succeeded John Mayor as MP for the seat, Mayor having resigned it in December 1782 for reasons that are unclear.

Howorth was unmarried but left a bequest to four illegitimate children born of Mary Chippendale. He was succeeded as MP for Abingdon by Edward Loveden Loveden.
