= Peniston Portlock Powney =

English politician (1743–1794)

Peniston Portlock Powney (1743 – 17 January 1794) was an English politician who was the Tory Member of Parliament for Windsor from 1780 to 1794. He was the son of Peniston Powney.
