= Alexander Garden (politician) =

Alexander Garden of Troup (1714 – 21 December 1785) was a Scottish politician.

He was the eldest son of Alexander Garden of Troup, Banffshire, advocate, by Jean, the daughter of Sir Francis Grant, 1st Baronet of Cullen, Banff and educated in Edinburgh and at King's College, Aberdeen. His younger brother was Francis Garden, Lord Gardenstone.

He was the Member of Parliament (MP) for Aberdeenshire from 1768 to 1785. He was a noted Scottish independent.

He died unmarried at his home, Troup House, in 1785.

Parliament of Great Britain
Preceded by Lord Adam Gordon	Member of Parliament for Aberdeenshire; 1768–1785	Succeeded by George Skene
