= Whitshed Keene =

British politician

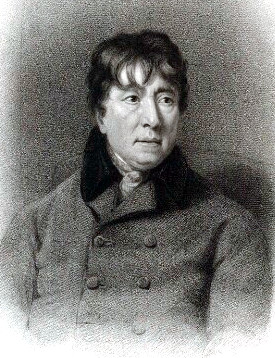
Whitshed Keene in 1816

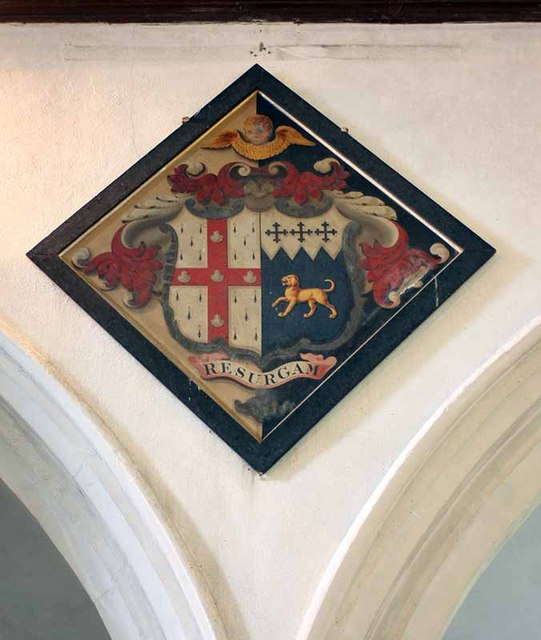
Hatchment to John Weyland, Esquire, of Woodrising, Norfolk, in Holy Trinity Church, Scoulton, Norfolk, who on 12 March 1799 married Elizabeth Keene, daughter and heiress of Whitshed Keene. Arms: Ermine, on a cross gules five escallops argent (Weyland) impaling: Azure, a talbot passant or on a chief indented argent three crosses-crosslet sable (Keene)

Whitshed Keene (c. 1731–1822) was an Irish soldier in the British Army and a politician who sat in the House of Commons for 50 years between 1768 and 1818.

Keene was born in Ireland, the son of Captain Gilbert Keene and his wife Alice Whitshed, daughter of Thomas Whitshed of Dublin, serjeant-at-law. He was educated at Trinity College, Dublin and was awarded BA in 1750. He joined the army and was lieutenant in the 5th Foot in 1754, captain in 1756 and major in 1762. He served as lieutenant colonel and then colonel in the Portuguese army. He then went to Paris, and attached himself to Stephen Fox the brother of Charles James Fox. He soon became acquainted with Lord Hertford, then ambassador, and became his master of the horse and gradually his intimate dependant. He retired from the army in 1768. He married Elizabeth Legge, daughter of George, Viscount Lewisham on 1 August 1771.

Keene was elected Member of Parliament for Wareham at a by-election in November 1768. In 1772 he became Secretary to the Lord Chamberlain, a post he held until March 1782. In 1774, when he was appointed to the Board of Trade, he was required to undergo re-election but having resigned at Wareham, he was then re-elected at Ludgershall where he sat for 6 months. He seems never to have spoken in the Parliament of 1768–1774.

At the 1774 general election Keene was returned unopposed at Montgomery on the Powis interest. He was returned there for a total of 44 years by three successive members of the Powis-Clive family. In June 1777 he was removed from the Board of Trade to succeed Thomas Worsley as surveyor general at the Board of Works. It was believed that Worsley could scarcely outlive the day, but he lived on until December 1778. Keene took up hs post in January 1779 and was paid £2,000 from secret service funds for his loss of salary etc. of the Board of Trade and election expenses.

In 1780 an opposition to Keene was intended at Montgomery but the neighbouring country gentleman who was proposed never materialized, and Keene's election was once more unopposed. He made his first speech on record on 28 April 1780 when he was on his legs three quarters of an hour, giving a full account of the Board of Works, and a detail of works done by it. On the fall of Lord North in March 1782 he lost his positions but was re-appointed secretary to the Lord Chamberlain and made a Lord of the Admiralty in the Coalition Government in April 1783. He lost both places when the coalition was dismissed in December 1783. The few interventions by him in the 1784-1790 parliament all refer to the work of that Board or of the Lord Chamberlain's office. Keene continued to sit for Montgomery for the rest of his parliamentary life on the interest of the Earls of Powis and was returned unopposed in 1784, 1790 and 1796. They could count on his loyalty and ensured his return in the only contest he faced in 1802. He took a very active part in parliament in his later years speaking on various topics until 1816. From then he made no mark in the House and retired in 1818. He died on 27 February 1822 aged 90.

Parliament of Great Britain
Preceded by Ralph Burton; Robert Palk	Member of Parliament for Wareham; 1768–1774; With: Robert Palk	Succeeded by Thomas de Grey; Robert Palk
Preceded by Lord Garlies; Sir Peniston Lamb	Member of Parliament for Ludgershall; 1774; With: Sir Peniston Lamb	Succeeded by Lord George Gordon; Sir Peniston Lamb
Preceded by Captain Frederick Cornewall	Member of Parliament for Montgomery; 1774–1800	Succeeded by Parliament of the United Kingdom
Parliament of the United Kingdom
Preceded by Parliament of Great Britain	Member of Parliament for Montgomery; 1801–1818	Succeeded by Henry Clive
