= John Mayor (brewer) =

English brewer and politician

- Born: 1735
- Died: 1817 (aged 81–82)
- Occupations: Brewer, politician

John Mayor (1735-1817) was an English brewer and politician who sat in the House of Commons between 1774 and 1782. He was the first superintendent of HM Stationery Office from 1786.

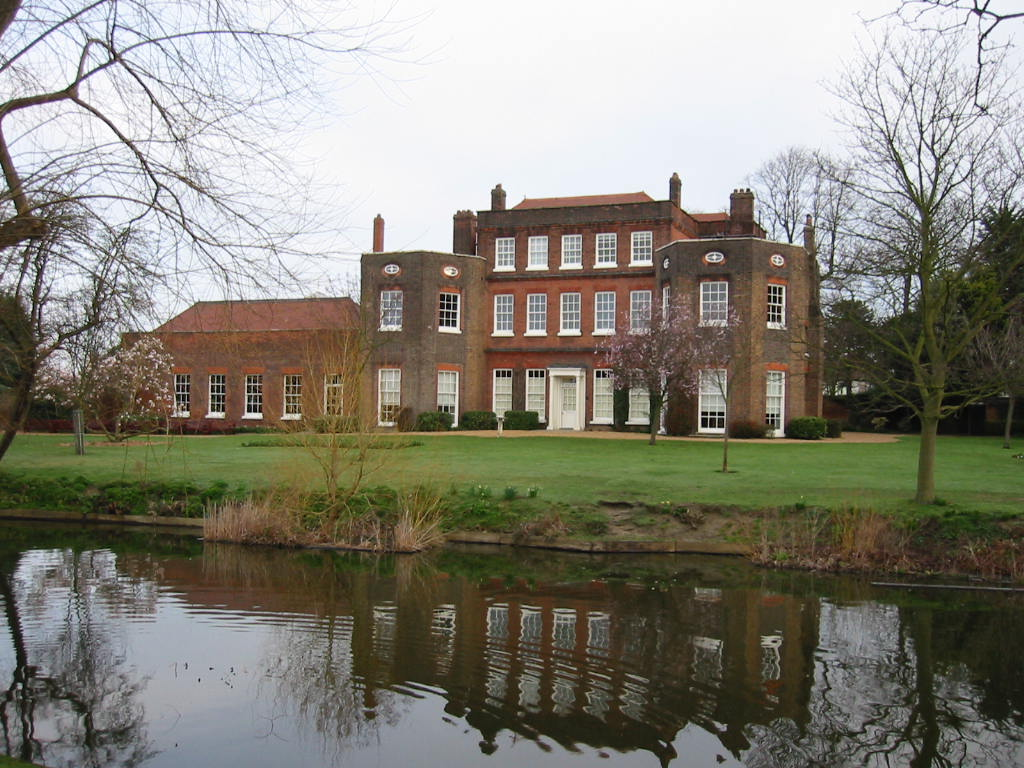
Langtons House

Mayor was the son of John Mayor, a brass founder, of Little Moorfields, London. He became a brewer in London and owned extensive property at Langtons House near Hornchurch Essex. He also acquired Lacy Court at Abingdon and became involved politically there. In February 1774 he became High Sheriff of Berkshire and in the 1774 British general election, he was elected Member of Parliament for Abingdon. His opponent petitioned against Mayor being returned while serving as sheriff. The election was declared void in March 1775 but having completed his term as Sheriff, Mayor was re-elected on 11 March. He was re-elected in the 1780 election but for unknown reasons he vacated his seat in December 1782. Mayor's only parliamentary speeches were in opposing a tax on malt. He had however rendered assistance to the Inland Revenue, particularly regarding the tax on paper. He was rewarded with a pension of £1,000.

Mayor was asked to submit to the Treasury a plan for controlling the supply of government stationery and in 1786 this resulted in the establishment of HM Stationery Office of which he became the first superintendent.

Mayor remained in office until 1799 and died on 23 September 1817.

Preceded by Nathaniel Bayly	Member of Parliament for Abingdon; 1774–1782	Succeeded by Henry Howorth
