= William Graves (MP) =

British politician (died 1801)

William Graves (c.1724 – 30 April 1801) was a British politician.

He was the eldest son of Rear-Admiral Thomas Graves and his second wife Elizabeth Budgell, and the brother of Thomas Graves. William was educated at Balliol College, Oxford and studied law at the Middle Temple (1739), where he was called to the bar in 1747. He became a Master in Chancery in 1761.

He sat in Parliament as the MP for West Looe in Cornwall from 1768 to 1774 and for East Looe from 1775 to 1783, 1784 to 1786 and 1796 to 1798. He died unmarried in 1801.
