= Christopher D'Oyly =

Barrister (1717–1795)

Christopher D'Oyly (1717 – 19 January 1795) was a barrister of the Inner Temple, under-secretary in the colonial department and commissary-general of the musters in which capacity he took part in the planning for the American War of Independence.

In 1765, D'Oyly married Sarah Stanley (1725–1821), the granddaughter of Sir Hans Sloane.

In 1774 he became the member of Parliament for Wareham, and in 1780 for Seaford. He retired in 1784.
