= Glemham =

Glemham is a surname. Notable people with the surname include:

- Edward Glemham (died c. 1594), English voyager and privateer
- Sir Charles Glemham (born 1576), English courtier and politician
- Sir Henry Glemham (died 1632), English politician
- Henry Glemham (c. 1603–1670), English royalist churchman
- Sir Thomas Glemham (c. 1594–1649), English Royalist commander

== See also ==
- Great Glemham, a village in Suffolk, England
- Little Glemham, a village in Suffolk, England
  - Glemham Hall, an Elizabethan stately home near Little Glemham
- Glenham (disambiguation)
