= Bence (surname) =

Bence is a surname, and may refer to:

- Alexander Bence (1590–1655), English merchant and politician
- Alfred Henry Bence (1908–1977), Canadian politician
- Amelia Bence (1914–2016), Argentine actress
- Cyril Bence (1902–1992), British politician
- Didier Bence (born 1987), Canadian boxer
- György Bence (1941–2006), Hungarian philosopher
- John Bence (1622–1688) (1622–1688), English merchant and politician
- John Bence (1670–1718), English politician
- Léon Bence (1929–1987), French physician
- Margarethe Bence (1930–1992), American opera singer
- Mark Bence-Jones (1930–2010), British writer
- Paul Bence (1948–2024), English football player
- Peter Bence (born 1991), Hungarian musician
- Roy Bence (1900–1979), Australian rules footballer
- Squire Bence (1597–1648), English merchant and politician

== See also ==
- Bense (surname)
- Benke
