= Henry Johnson (politician, died 1719) =

British shipbuilder and Member of Parliament

Sir Henry Johnson

Member of Parliament for Aldeburgh
- In office 1707–1719 Serving with William Johnson, Samuel Lowe
- Preceded by: Parliament of England
- Succeeded by: Samuel Lowe; Walter Plumer
- In office 1689–1707 Serving with William Johnson
- Preceded by: John Bence; Sir Henry Bedingfield
- Succeeded by: Parliament of Great Britain

Personal details
- Born: 31 August 1661
- Died: 29 September 1719 (aged 58) Bath, Somerset
- Spouse(s): Anne Smithson (m. 1686, died) Martha Johnson, 8th Baroness Wentworth (m. 1693)
- Relations: William Johnson (brother); William Wentworth, 2nd Earl of Strafford (grandson)
- Children: Anne Wentworth, Countess of Strafford
- Parent(s): Henry Johnson; Mary Lord

Sir Henry Johnson (13 August 1661 – 29 September 1719) of The Gate House, Blackwall, Middlesex; Bradenham, Buckinghamshire; and Toddington, Bedfordshire was a British shipbuilder and a Member of Parliament for 30 years.

== Early life ==
He was born the eldest son of Sir Henry Johnson, M.P., of Blackwall and Friston Hall, Suffolk by Dorothy Lord, the daughter and heiress of William Lord of Melton, Kent. Among his siblings were William Johnson and Martha Johnson (who married Hill Mussenden, MP for Harwich and brother to Carteret Leathes).

== Career ==
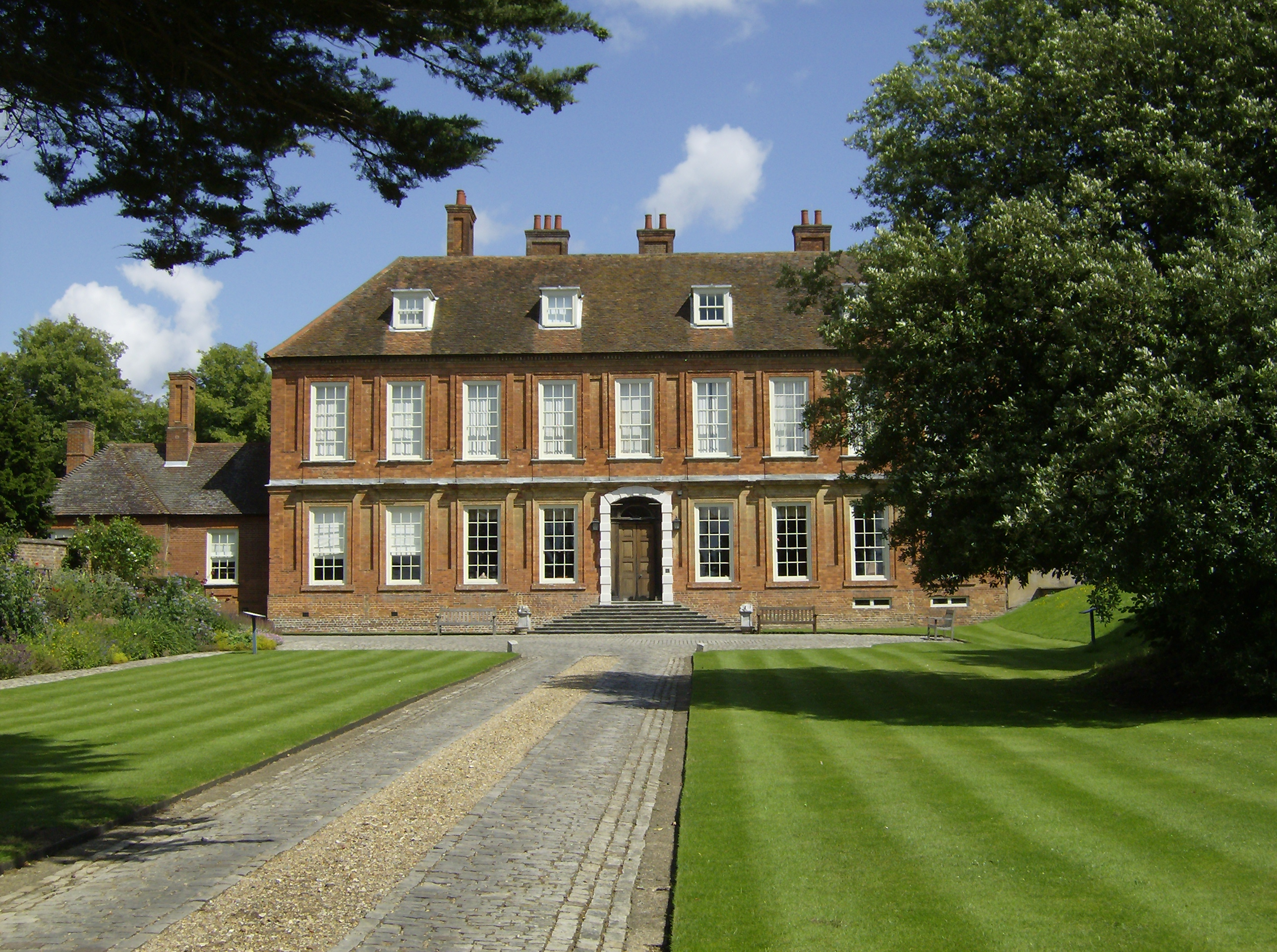
Bradenham Manor house

Described as "the greatest shipbuilder and shipowner of his day, having at one time shares in 38 vessels" as well as owning considerable East India Company stock. Later, he had become a bitter opponent of the East India Company and was one of the leading members of the syndicate established in October 1691 to break its monopoly, likely as a result of a dispute with Sir Josiah Child, 1st Baronet.

Johnson succeeded his father in 1683 and was knighted in March 1685. He served as one of the two members of Parliament for Aldeburgh from 1689 to 1719, his younger brother William, who died in 1718, being the other member for all but a year of that time. Upon his death in 1719, he was succeeded as by Walter Plumer after a by-election.

He became an Elder Brother of Trinity House in 1700 and Master from 1707 to 1709.

== Personal life ==
On 20 May 1686, Johnson married his first wife Anne Smithson, daughter and heiress of London haberdasher Hugh Smithson (third son of Sir Hugh Smithson, 1st Baronet). Before her death, they had one daughter:

- Anne Johnson (c. 1684–1754), who married Thomas Wentworth, 1st Earl of Strafford, and had four children.

On 11 March 1693, he made an advantageous second marriage to Martha Lovelace, who became suo jure the 8th Baroness Wentworth in 1697, daughter and heiress of John Lovelace, 3rd Baron Lovelace and the former Martha Pye. The younger Martha was heiress to some of her father's property in Berkshire; through her grandmother Anne Lovelace, 7th Baroness Wentworth; to Water Eaton in Oxfordshire and Toddington in Bedfordshire and through her maternal grandfather Sir Edmund Pye, 1st Baronet to the Bradenham estate in Buckinghamshire.

Johnson died of gout at Bath on 29 September 1719 and was buried in the Wentworth vault at Toddington. He left his several estates to his granddaughters.

=== Descendants ===
Through his daughter Anne, he was a grandfather of four: William Wentworth, 2nd Earl of Strafford; Lady Anne Wentworth (wife of Irish statesman and landowner William James Conolly); Lady Lucy Wentworth (wife of Sir George Howard); Lady Henrietta Wentworth (wife of Henry Vernon of Hilton and mother of Henrietta, Lady Grosvenor).

Parliament of England
Preceded by John Bence; Sir Henry Bedingfield	Member of Parliament for Aldeburgh; 1689–1707; With: William Johnson	Succeeded by Parliament of Great Britain
Parliament of Great Britain
Preceded by Parliament of England	Member of Parliament for Aldeburgh; 1707–1719; With: William Johnson 1707–1718; Samuel Lowe 1718–1719	Succeeded by Samuel Lowe; Walter Plumer
