= William Rainsborowe =

American colonist

Major-General William Rainsborowe
- Born: Wapping, London, England
- Died: 19 December 1673 (aged 61); Boston New England
- Education: Magdalene College, Cambridge
- Occupations: Mariner, Businessman
- Known for: Adventurer, Parliamentarian, Leveller, Amongst the first English Colonists of New England

Major William Rainsborowe (? – fl. 1612–1673), or Rainborowe, was an officer in the English Navy and New Model Army in England during the English Civil War and the Interregnum. He was a political and religious radical who prospered during the years of the Parliamentary ascendancy and was an early settler of New England in North America.

== Earlier life ==
Rainsborowe's birth and early years are obscure. William's brother was the Leveller Thomas Rainsborough so it is more than certain he was born in Wapping London England. His father, William Rainsborough, was a captain and Vice-Admiral in the Royal Navy, and later Ambassador to Morocco (at which time he declined an Hereditary Knighthood). In later years William held Property in Wapping and Shadwell London. He also had a home in Putney London, as his brother Thomas stayed there during the Putney Debates of 1647. William Rainsborowe was educated in Magdelene College, Cambridge

=== New England and Morocco ===
William moved to the Massachusetts Bay Colony in the 1630s with his sisters, at one point living in Charlestown and was serving in the militia there in 1639. At some point, William and his brother, Thomas Rainsborough, were both involved in an expedition to the other Puritan colony, Providence Island colony, off the coast of Nicaragua. Providence Island fell to the Spanish in 1641 and became part of the New Kingdom of Granada.

William was tasked with an expedition in 1637 to reclaim English civilians who were enslaved in Salé. The town that he planned to blockade was governed under the corsair Republic of Sale. During this blockade, he managed to destroy more than a dozen ships and killed hundreds. He eventually made alliances with Sidi al-Ayachi and the Sultan Mohammed esh-Sheikh es-Seghir, the expedition was a success, liberating 348 captives.

== Return to England in 1642 ==
Rainsborowe was called back to England upon the death of his father in 1642. He married a woman named Margery Jenney of Suffolk upon his return and almost immediately went to serve in the Navy. When war broke out in Ireland during the Irish Rebellion of 1641, he was part of an expedition there. He subsequently became an officer in a cavalry unit in 1644. He and his brother, Thomas Rainsborough, were both Levellers and probably members of the congregationalist churches known at the time as "Independents" (who were generally more militantly anti-Catholic and opposed to the Established Church than the Puritans).

== Battle of Naseby and the Putney debates ==
He fought in The Battle of Naseby on 14 June 1645 alongside his brother Colonel Thomas Rainsborough. In the New Model Army, he was a Captain serving for Colonel Thomas Sheffield as seen in the Naseby order of battle. However, his radicalism emerged early. In May 1647 in Saffron Walden Essex at a meeting with Parliamentary commissioners, he testified against Colonel Sheffield. Rainsborowe stated that the army was demoralised. He then outlined the complaints of his men. The army did not support their Colonel and Sheffield was afterwards removed. Rainsborowe was then promoted to the rank of Major under Colonel Thomas Harrison. The Saffron Walden Debates of May 1647 are considered the prelude to the Putney Debates of October 1647. In these debates the army wanted certain rights and freedoms. These debates and a Second English Civil War (1648–1649) would lead to the Commonwealth of England (1649–60) when England became a Republic. Rainsborowe showed his Leveller convictions during the army's Putney Debates at the end of October. William's brother, Thomas Rainborowe, was more fiery in his Leveller speeches, and he was murdered by Royalists in a bungled kidnap attempt in Doncaster in October 1648. William led the funeral, and a pamphlet called The Second Part of Englands New Chaines Discovered of that year discussed Rainsborowe's attempts at finding justice and the resistance of the upper classes. William Rainsborowe's cornet, according to the Dictionary of National Biography, was, during this time, a depiction of the severed head of Charles I and the motto salus populi: suprema lex ("let the good of the people be the supreme law").

== Radicalism and controversy ==
Coat of Arms of William Rainsborowe

In 1649, when issues surrounding the Leveller movement were at a head, Rainsborowe was removed from command. He was recommended for promotion twice in the 1650s, and each time the recommendation was over-ruled by the government. He hosted Ranters meetings, and he was arrested for paying for the publication of Laurence Clarkson's The Single Eye (1650).

During the 1650s, Rainsborowe put his religious and political views into economic action. He purchased ecclesiastical lands, and he purchased the formerly Crown Estate of Higham Park now Higham Ferrers Northamptonshire. Rainborowe's wealth was extensive, for the estate was sold for £5,498 in 1654.

== Arrest for treason and death ==
The Rump Parliament made him a Colonel and had him raise a regiment in 1659, but the Rump itself was dissolved and overturned. Rainsborowe protested against this by signing A Remonstrance and Protestation of the Well-Affected People. Rainsborowe tried to sell the arms he had purchased for his militia. A political radical selling a great store of pistols just in the midst of a change from republicanism to a restored Monarchy and Crown was extremely provocative. This prompted his arrest on suspicion of treason in December 1660. This at the time of the Restoration. He was imprisoned in the Tower of London in December 1660, and then released on bail in February 1661. Major Rainsborowe joins a long List of prisoners of the Tower of London.

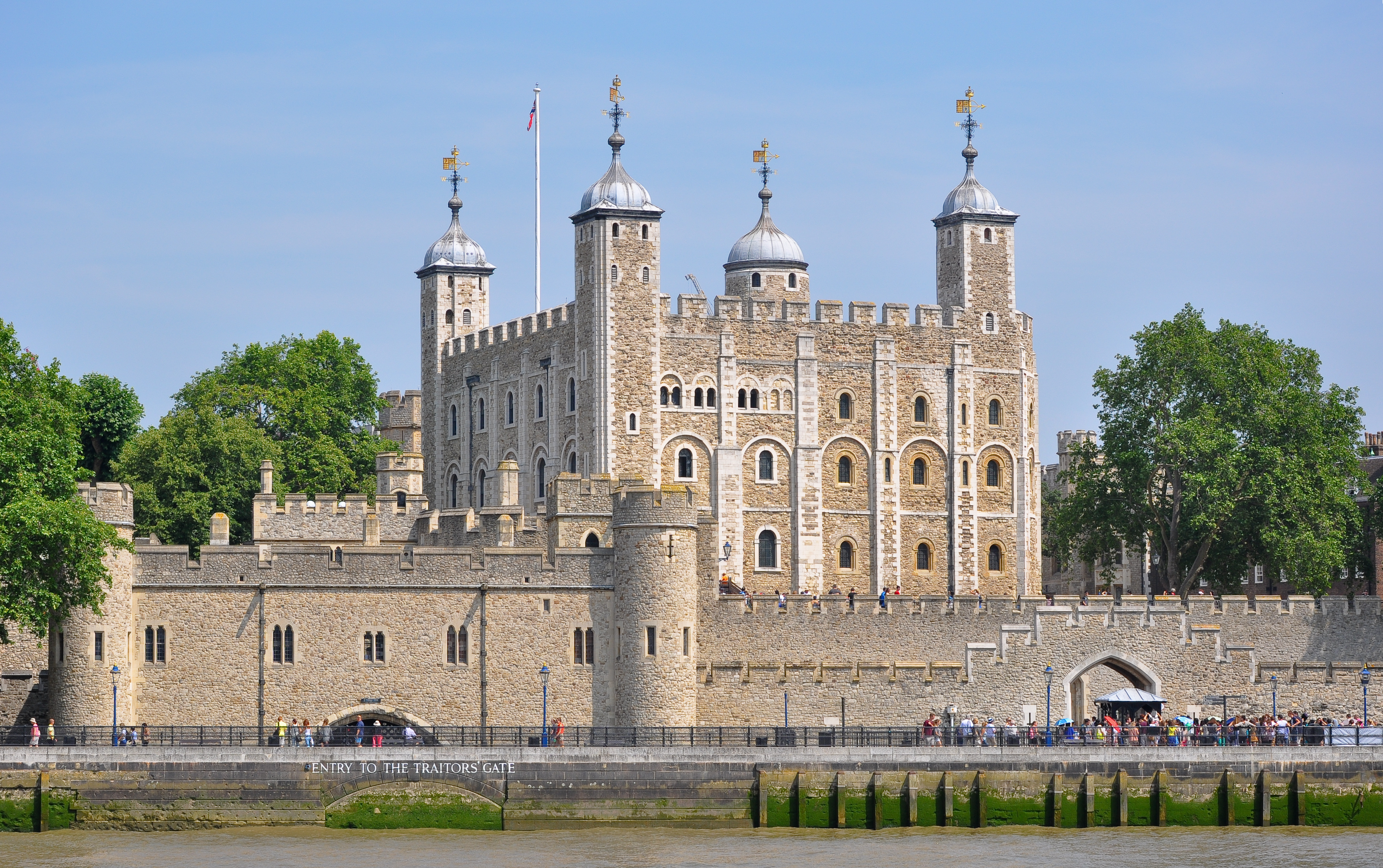
Tower of London viewed from the River Thames

Upon release on bail Rainsborowe left England. He does not enter public record again until his death in 1673 in Boston, New England.

== Images ==
The Battle of Naseby June 1645

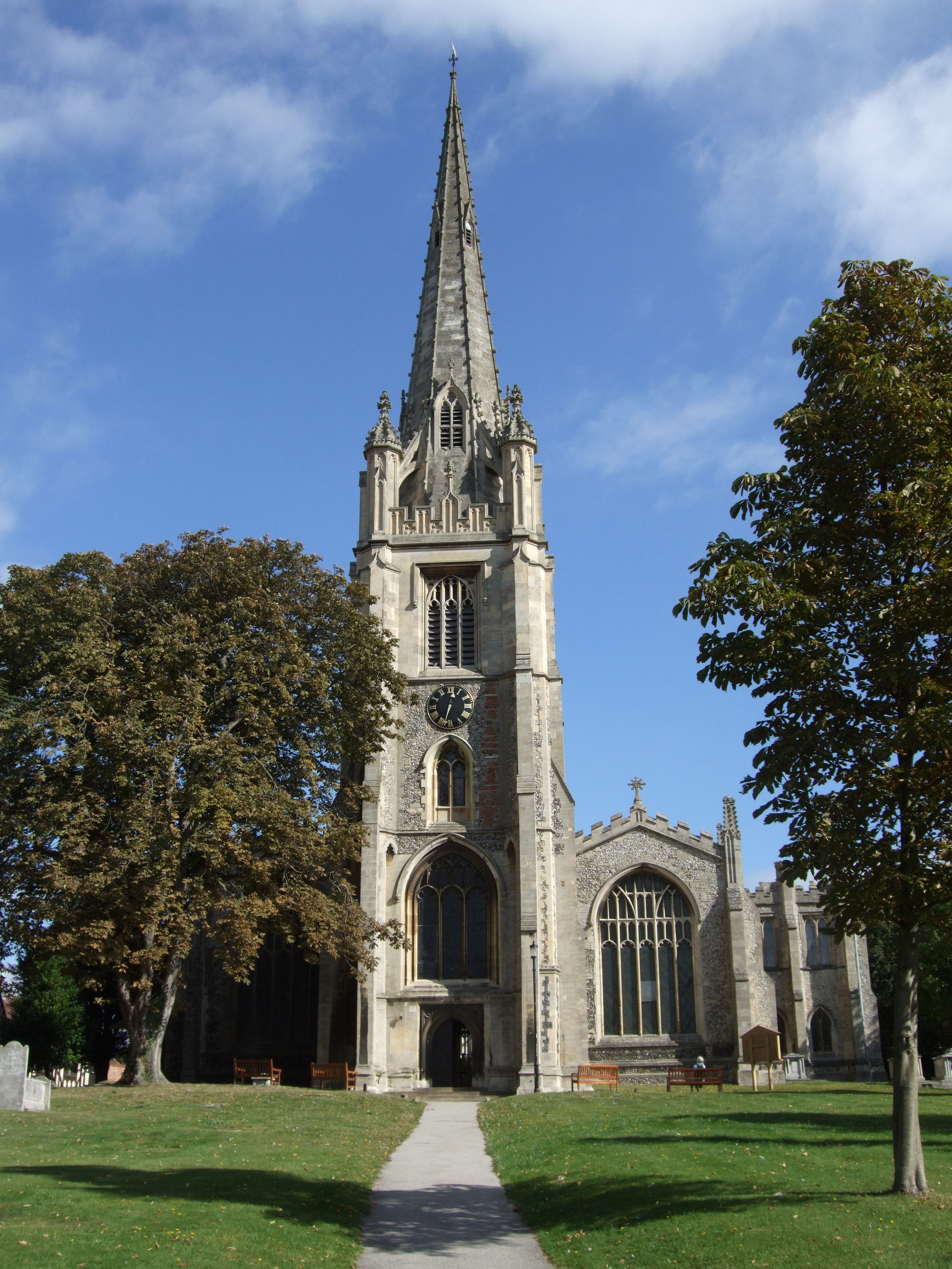
Saffron Walden Debates May 1647 St Mary's Church

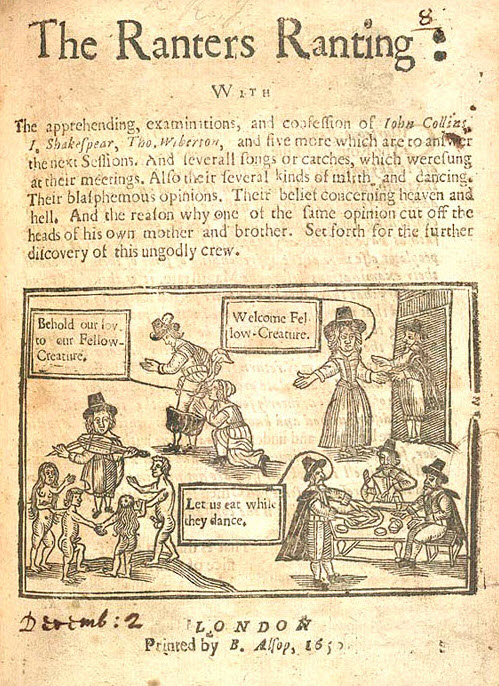
Anti Ranter Publications 1650
