= William Johnson (MP for Aldeburgh) =

English Member of Parliament

William Johnson (c. 1660 - 1718) of Blackwall, Middlesex, and Mandeville's Manor, Sternfield, Aldeburgh, Suffolk, was an English merchant, shipbuilder and Tory politician who sat in the English and British House of Commons for 29 years from 1689 to 1718

== Early life ==
Johnson was the second son of Sir Henry Johnson and his wife Dorothy Lord, daughter of William Lord of Melton, Kent. He was educated at Leyden in 1678. He went to Bengal as a factor for the East India Company and sometime after 1683, he returned to England and established himself as a merchant, trading to Africa and the Peninsula. He bought Mandeville's Manor, Sternfield, near Aldeburgh, but lived mainly near the shipyard inherited by his brother Henry at Blackwall. By 1687, he married Agneta Baron, daughter of Hartgill Baron, clerk of the privy seal, of Windsor, Berkshire.

== Career ==
From 1687 to 1689 Johnson was an Assistant of the Royal African Company. At the 1689 English general election, he was returned as Tory Member of Parliament for Aldeburgh on the interest of his brother Henry. Also in 1689, he was appointed Commissioner for assessment, for Middlesex, Suffolk and Aldeburgh to 1690, and Deputy Lieutenant for Tower Hamlets at least to 1702. He was not active in the Convention Parliament, but served on six committees including one to consider the management of the East India trade, one for the bill for restoring corporations, and one on a petition from the Royal Africa Company.

Johnson was returned for Aldeburgh in a contest at the 1690 English general election. On 2 April 1690 he was appointed to draft a bill to regulate the East India trade. He was appointed a Gentleman of the privy chamber from 1690 to 1702. He was also a committee member of the East India Company from 1690 to 1691. With his brother, Sir Henry, he was part of a syndicate that from 1691 to 1694 tried unsuccessfully to challenge the East India Company's monopoly. He was returned unopposed for Aldeburgh at the 1695 English general election and was appointed on 20 February to prepare a bill to regulate the East India Company. He signed the Association in February, and in March voted against fixing the price of guineas at 22 shillings. On 25 November 1696, he voted against the attainder of Sir John Fenwick. With his brother, he returned to the East India Company, and was committee member from 1698 to 1699.

At the 1698 English general election, Johnson and his brother both stood at Aldeburgh, where they were returned unopposed again, and he stood on his own at Orford, where he was defeated. He petitioned, and then in February 1700, he went on a long voyage to the East Indies and China. The petition was finally declared in his favour after the dissolution of Parliament. From the first general election of 1701, he stood only at Aldeburgh, where he was returned unopposed then and in the second general election of that year. As a Tory, he supported the motion of 26 February 1702 to vindicate the Commons’ proceedings over the impeachment of the Whig ministers in the previous session. He was committee member of the East India Company again from 1702 to 1705. He was not recorded as voting on the Tack on 28 November 1704.

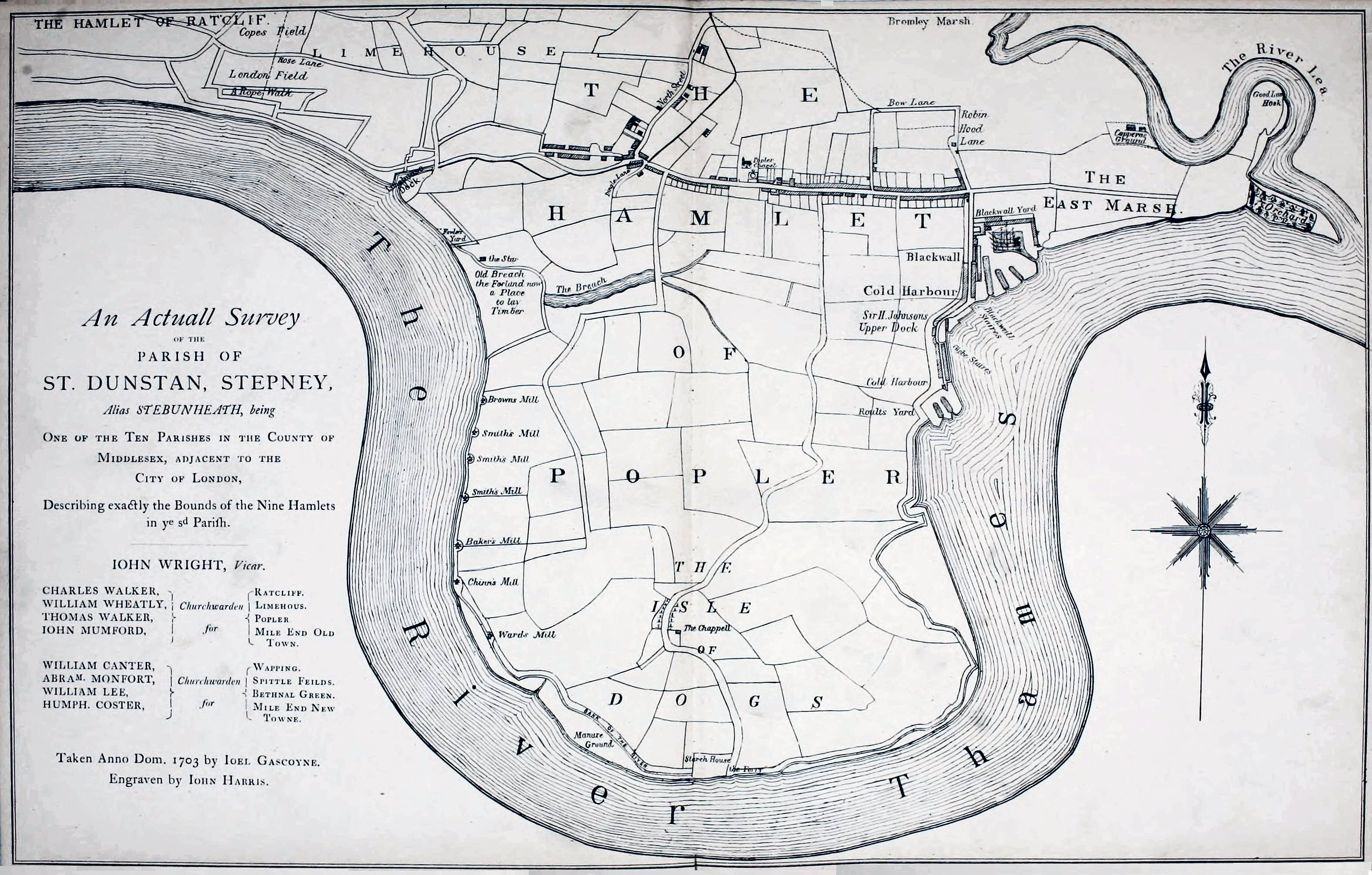
Poplar and Blackwall dock, 1703

Johnson's brother Henry having inherited their father's ship building yard at Blackwall, ran it using a succession of managers. By 1704 William Johnson was running of the business, and between 1704 and 1710 built five ships-of-the-line and six other vessels there. He was living in the house in the yard from at least 1705, and probably lived there over a longer period. In 1709 he became an Elder Brother of Trinity House for the rest of his life.

Johnson was returned unopposed at the 1705 English general election and was absent from the vote on the Speaker on 25 October 1705. He was returned as usual as a Tory at the 1708 British general election and voted against the impeachment of Dr Sacheverell in 1710. After the 1710 British general election he was listed among the ‘Tory patriots’ who opposed the continuation of the war, and the ‘worthy patriots’ who exposed the mismanagements of the previous ministry. He was appointed Commissioner for sewers for Tower Hamlets in 1712.

At the 1715 British general election Johnson was returned for Aldeburgh for the last time. He voted against the septennial bill. In 1716, he took the post of governor of Guinea (Gold Coast) under the Royal African Company, and sailed soon after 16 December 1716

== Death and legacy ==
Johnson was reported to have died at Cape Coast Castle in November 1718. He and his wife had three sons and nine daughters. All his property was to be sold, and the proceeds divided equally among the surviving members of his family, except for his one married daughter.

Parliament of England
Preceded by John Bence; Sir Henry Bedingfield	Member of Parliament for Aldeburgh; 1689–1707; With: Sir Henry Johnson	Succeeded by Parliament of Great Britain
Preceded by Sir Charles Hedges; Sir Thomas Felton	Member of Parliament for Orford; 1700–1701; With: Sir Edmund Bacon	Succeeded by Sir Edmund Bacon; Sir Edward Turnor
Parliament of Great Britain
Preceded by Parliament of England	Member of Parliament for Aldeburgh; 1707–1718; With: Sir Henry Johnson	Succeeded by Sir Henry Johnson; Samuel Lowe
