= Henry Bedingfield (judge) =

English lawyer and politician

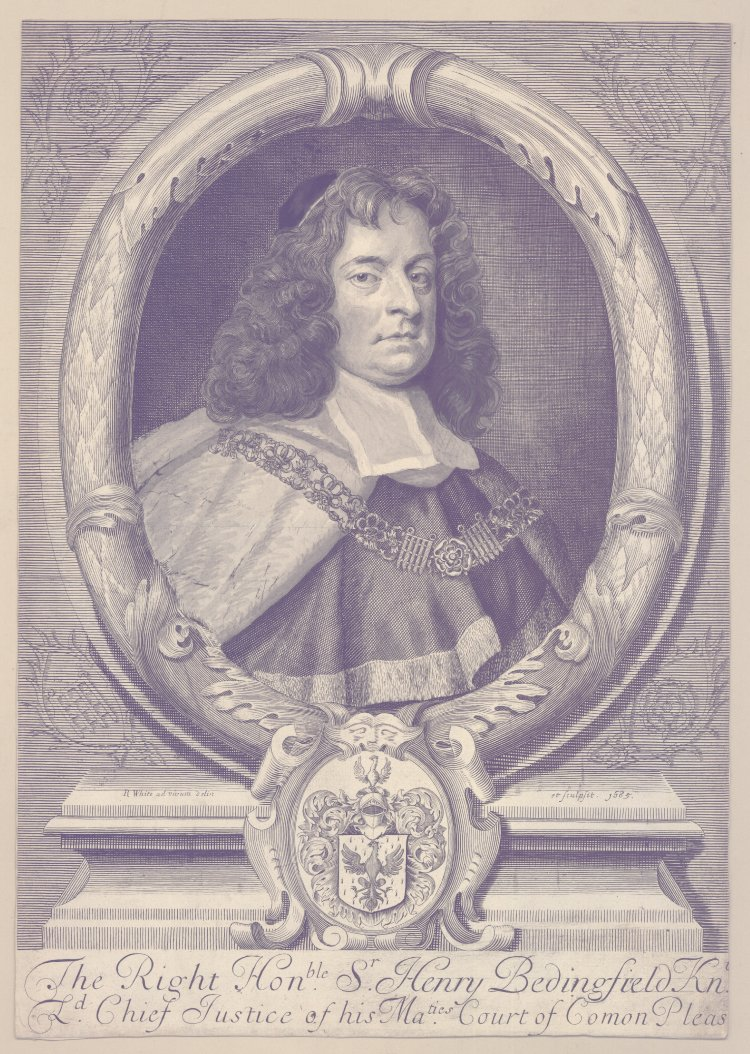
Sir Henry Bedingfield

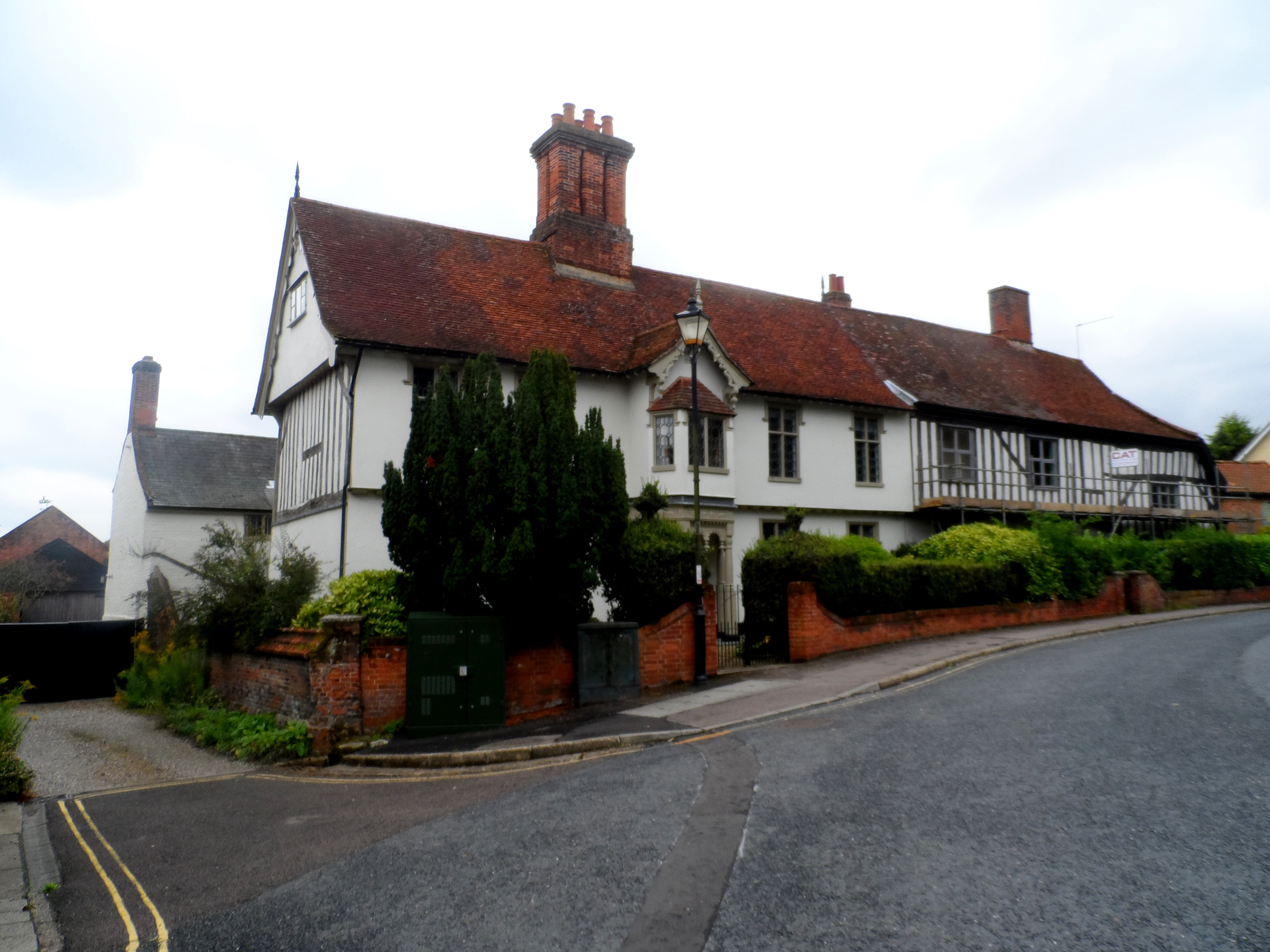
The Gothic House, Halesworth - Seat of the Bedingfield family

Sir Henry Bedingfield (1632 – 6 February 1687) was an English lawyer and politician who sat in the House of Commons in 1660 and from 1685 to 1686. He was briefly Chief Justice of the Common Pleas at the end of his life.

== Early life and family ==
Henry Bedingfield was the son of John Bedingfield (1595–1680) of Halesworth, Suffolk and was baptised on 9 December 1632. He was the nephew of Sir Thomas Bedingfield. He was educated at Norwich Grammar School and admitted to Gonville and Caius College, Cambridge in 1650. He also entered Lincoln's Inn that year, and was called to the bar in 1657. The following year he was made a freeman of Dunwich, enabling him to be elected to the Convention Parliament in 1660. He did not seek re-election subsequently, preferring to concentrate on his legal practice.

== Later career ==
In 1683, he presented an address from Dunwich, abhorring the Rye House Plot. That November he became a bencher of Lincoln's Inn, a serjeant at law the following January, and a King's Serjeant the following November, when he was also knighted. Following the succession of James II, he was elected a Tory MP for Aldeburgh. In February 1686 he was appointed a Justice of Common Pleas and in April Chief Justice of the Common Pleas.

== Private life ==
However, he died suddenly in the following February. He had married, c.1667, his cousin Mary, daughter of Robert Bedingfield, DD, rector of Newton, Cambridgeshire and had 2 daughters.

Parliament of England
Preceded by Robert Brewster; John Barrington	MP for Dunwich; 1660	Succeeded by Richard Coke; Sir John Rous
Preceded by John Bence; John Corrance	MP for Aldeburgh; 1685–1687; With: John Bence	Succeeded by Sir Henry Johnson; William Johnson
Legal offices
Preceded by Sir Thomas Jones	Chief Justice of the Common Pleas; 1686–1687	Succeeded by Sir Edward Herbert
