= FolkEast =

Arts festival in Suffolk, England

FolkEast is an English music festival which started in 2012 at Somerleyton Hall, Suffolk, England. In 2013, it relocated to Glemham Hall in Little Glemham, Suffolk, where it held its annual festival on the weekend before the August bank holiday weekend until 2024.

In 2025 FolkEast moved to Sotterley Hall, also in Suffolk.

FolkEast is a cross-arts celebration of music, song, dance, crafts and musical instruments. The festival attracts many international renowned musicians, artists and groups such as The Young'uns, Ten Strings and a Goat Skin, Neil Innes, The Unthanks and Martin Carthy among many others.

== Events throughout the year ==
As well as the main festival in August, FolkEast organises and promotes folk and roots events, ceilidhs and concerts at various venues across East Anglia throughout the year. Past events include The Young'uns at Jubilee Hall in Aldeburgh, Peter Knight's "Gigspanner" at Glemham Hall and The Willows at Norwich Arts Centre.

== Instrumental ==
New to FolkEast 2015 was the introduction of "Instrumental", a section of the festival dedicated to musical instrument makers from across the UK and further field.

== Stages and venues ==
Sunset Stage
The Sunset Stage is provided by a local company, Luminaire Extraordinaire, and nestles in the natural amphitheatre formed by the slope of the land.

Broad Roots
Broad Roots was conceived in 2011 by John and Lynne Ward with the aim of celebrating and promoting folk and roots music to the furthest fringe of East Anglia. The Broad Roots Stage at FolkEast offers an array of talent from the local and regional area alongside those from further afield. In 2014, the Broad Roots was floored and now plays host to the ceilidhs as well as concerts.

Broad Roots Club
The Broad Roots Club Stage provides a smaller, more intimate venue to get up close and personal with the acts performing.

Get on the Soapbox Stage
The SoapBox Stage is run by the creative producer Amy Wragg, an independent music and spoken word promoter based in the East of England Her passion for the local scene brings an eclectic mix of new and established artists to FolkEast in a unique venue in the woods, accessible only through a magical willow tunnel.

Garden Stage
In 2015, the Garden Stage was added to FolkEast's list of on-site venues. Tucked away in the gardens of Glemham Hall, the permanent marquee, which is usually decked out for weddings, is the place to be for quiet interludes, morris dance workshops and evening sing around sessions. In 2015, it was the venue for the first FolkEast Gardener's Questions Time with Steven Coghill, senior horticulturalist at King's College Cambridge, in the chair.

Church of St. Andrew, Little Glemham
A short stroll away from the main site, the delightful Church of St Andrew in Little Glemham provides a quiet and serene setting for a series of intimate recitals and performances.

The Morris Stage
There is also an outdoor platform on which the Morris Teams perform and several small stages and areas for impromptu and scheduled sessions and workshops in and around the site.

The 2025 move to Sotterly Hall saw the reappearance of the Sunset Stage and the Moot Hall with new venues "The Barn" and the Church of St. Margret, the Sotterley parish church, added.

== Green credentials ==
FolkEast has been awarded a Suffolk Carbon Charter Silver Award for procuring many of its food and infrastructure suppliers locally, including a "solar bus" which entirely powers the Soapbox Stage at the festival.
