= Higford =

Higford may refer to:

- Higford, Shropshire, a small settlement in Shropshire, England
- John Higford, a former English politician
- Robert Higford, a former English politician
- Daniel Higford Davall Burr, a former English politician
