= Francis Harvey (disambiguation) =

Francis Harvey (1873–1916) was an officer of the British Royal Marine Light Infantry during the First World War.

Francis Harvey or Frank Harvey may also refer to:

- Francis Harvey (MP for Colchester) (1534–1602), English politician, MP for Colchester, Knaresborough and Chippenham
- Francis Harvey (died 1632), MP for Aldeburgh
- Francis Harvey (MP for Northampton) (1611–1703), English lawyer and politician
- Frank Harvey (cricketer) (1864–1939), English sportsman
- Frank Harvey (playwright) (1842–1903), English father of Australian screenwriter
- Frank Harvey (Australian screenwriter) (1885–1965), English-born actor, producer and writer
- Frank Harvey (English screenwriter) (1912–1981), award-winning son of the above screenwriter
- Francis Harvey (poet) (1925–2014), Northern Irish poet and playwright
- Frank Harvey (priest) (1930–1986), Anglican Archdeacon of London
- Francis J. Harvey (born 1943), Secretary of the United States Army
