= Henry Johnson (shipbuilder) =

Sir Henry Johnson (c. 1623–1683) was an English shipbuilder and politician who sat in the House of Commons in 1679. He was one of the leading commercial shipbuilders on the River Thames during the period of enormous mercantile expansion and the Dutch wars after the Restoration..

== Early life ==
Johnson was baptized on. 25 January 1623, the eldest son of Francis Johnson of Aldeburgh and his wife Mary Pett, daughter of Peter Pett of Deptford, Kent. His father was descended from a merchant family and his great-grandfather Francis Johnson settled at Aldeburgh and was MP for the borough in 1597. His mother’s family were shipbuilders of Kent. He succeeded his father in 1636. In 1639 he was apprenticed as a shipbuilder to his cousin Phineas Pett, the Royal Shipwright. He married Dorothy Lord, daughter of William Lord of Melton, Kent, on 13 December 1648.

== Career ==
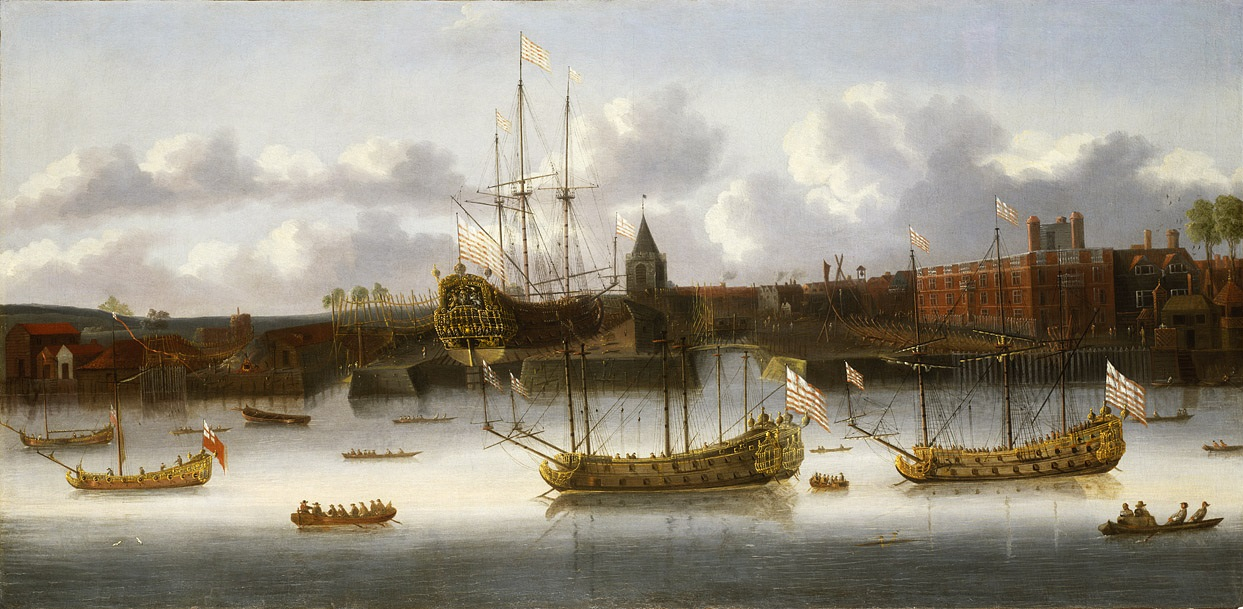
The East India Company's Yard at Deptford, 17th Century, National Maritime Museum, Greenwich

Johnson was Commissioner for sewers for Middlesex in 1647. By 1651 he was building ships for both the merchant service and the Commonwealth navy at Deptford, constructing two ships of over 500 tons at Deptford for the government in 1649 and 1650. The East India Company decided to sell its shipyard and docks at Blackwall because the finances of the company were poor, and its business was affected by the Civil War. Johnson was able to buy the yard for £4,350. He lived at Blackwall in the house at the entrance to the dockyard at the north-west corner of the yard. Between 1653 and 1656 he bought land outside the yard and he built the Globe Tavern and the coopers' buildings and a slaughter house. In 1656, the property was described as having three docks, two launching slips, two cranes, and storehouses. In 1659, he commissioned the building of a large wet dock which was the largest on the river for 30 years.

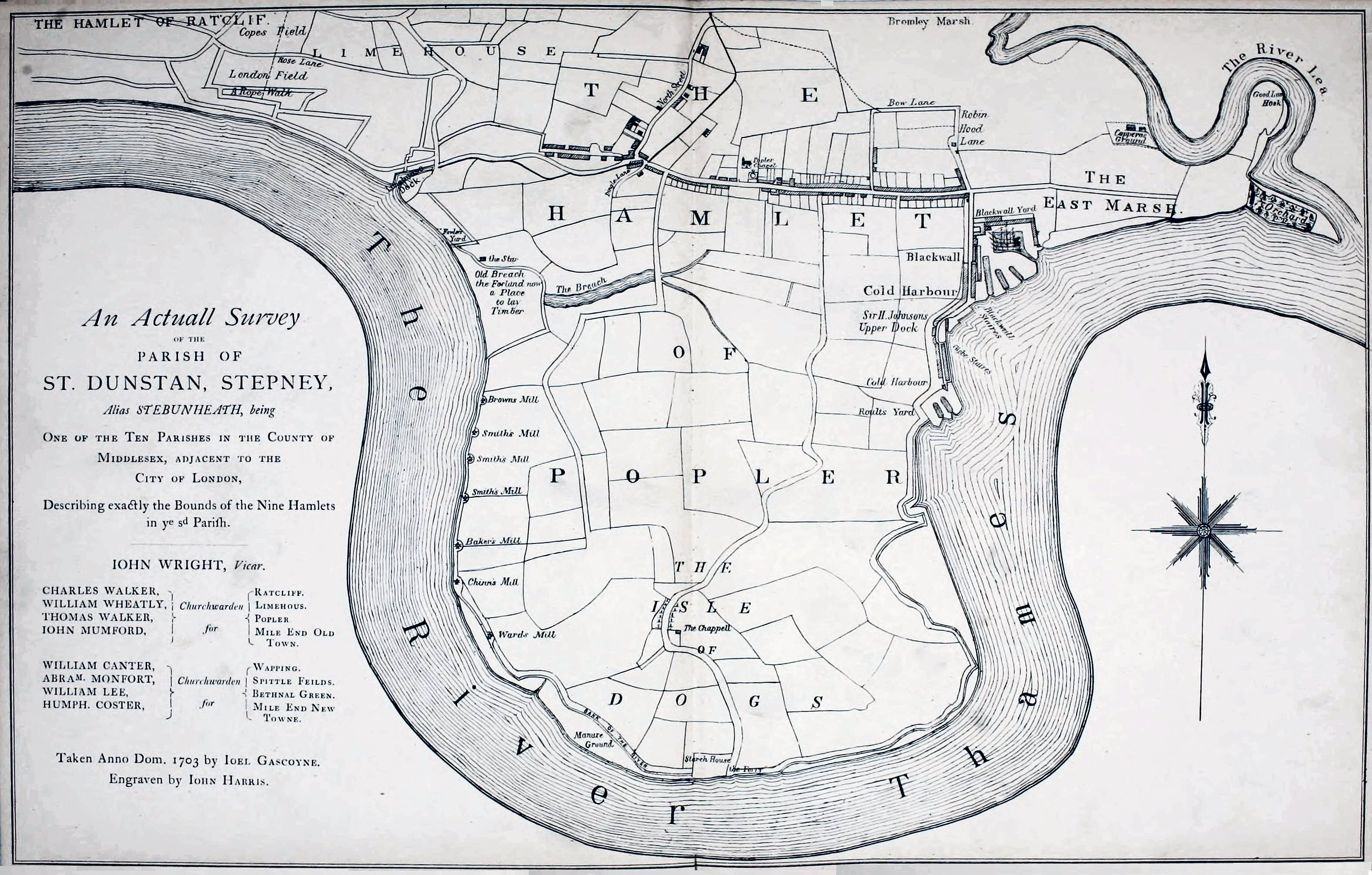
Poplar and Blackwall dock, 1703

After the Restoration, Johnson became one of the leading shipbuilders and owners of the time. The size of the merchant navy grew considerably, and the Dutch Wars increased the demand for naval shipping. He. was a Younger Brother of Trinity House in August 1660 and became Commissioner for sewers for Havering and Dagenham levels in September 1660. In 1662 he bought Friston estate, three miles from Aldeburgh, from Thomas Bacon, and rebuilt the Hall. From 1662, Charles II encouraged merchant shipbuilding by offering a bounty in remission of customs to their builders. Johnson was building ships for the Royal Navy and the East India Company, in which he held £1,200 stock. In 1663, he was a member of the Royal Adventurers into Africa.. He was a great friend of Samuel Pepys who as senior clerk in the Navy office commissioned a survey in 1666 which Johnson’s yard had the greatest capacity of all commercial yards on the Thames. As business expanded there was a shortage of skilled labour and Johnson had to seek assurances that his carpenters and other work were not set upon by the press gangs. He continued to take a share of the merchants business and was a member of the Royal Africa Company in 1672. From 1677 to 1680, he was Commissioner for assessment for Middlesex and Suffolk, and by 1678 was a captain. of Middlesex foot militia.

At the first general election of 1679, Johnson was returned as Member of Parliament for Aldeburgh. in the first Exclusion Parliament, He was reasonably active and was appointed to six committees, including that to examine the disbandment accounts. He is said to have voted against exclusion. He did not stand for Parliament again. From 1679 to 1680 he was Commissioner for Assessment for Aldeburgh. He was knighted at his own house at Blackwall by the King on 8 March 1680. In 1683 he became a committee member of the East India Company.

== Death and legacy ==
Johnson died at Bath and was buried on 19 November 1683 in the East India Company chapel at Poplar, for which he had contributed towards the building costs. Under his will almshouses were built at Poplar for six ships’ carpenters. He left two sons, Henry and William, and three daughters.

Parliament of England
Preceded by John Bence; Sir John Holland, Bt	Member of Parliament for Aldeburgh; 1679; With: Sir Richard Haddock	Succeeded by John Bence; John Corrance
