= John Foxe (MP) =

16th-century English politician

John Foxe (died 1586), of Aldeburgh, Suffolk, was an English politician.

He was a member (MP) of the parliament of England for Aldeburgh in 1584.
