= John Williams (died 1743) =

English merchant and Tory politician

Sir John Williams (c. 1675 – 7 May 1743) was an English merchant and Tory politician who sat in the House of Commons from 1730 to 1734.

== Personal life ==
Williams was the second son of Reginald Williams of Stoke by Nayland, and his second wife Sarah Dyke, daughter of Sir Thomas Dyke of Horsham, Sussex. He died on 7 May 1743 after languishing of a dropsy and had been tapped several times. He left three sons.

== Career ==
Williams was a merchant in trade with Turkey and was said to be ‘the greatest exporter of cloth in England. In 1711 he became a director of the South Sea Company, a role he held until 1715. In 1720 he was sub-governor of the Royal Exchange Assurance 1720. He was elected Alderman for Cripplegate on 20 June 1723 and was knighted on 23 June 1723. He also became Master of the Mercers Company in 1723. He stood for parliament at Minehead in a by-election in 1723, but was unsuccessful. At the 1727 British general election, he contested City of London and was again unsuccessful. He was Sheriff of London for the year 1729 to 1730.

Williams was returned as Tory MP for Aldeburgh at a by-election on 8 May 1730. He did not stand in 1734. He served as Lord Mayor of London for the year 1735 to 1736.

Parliament of Great Britain
Preceded by William Windham; Samuel Lowe	Aldeburgh; 1730–1734; With: Samuel Lowe; George Purvis 1732-1734	Succeeded by William Conolly; George Purvis
Civic offices
Preceded by Sir Edward Bellamy	Lord Mayor of London; 1735– 1736	Succeeded by Sir John Thompson
