= Glenham (disambiguation) =

Glenham is a town in South Dakota, United States.

Glenham may also refer to:

- Glenham, New York, United States
- Glenham Hotel (935–939 Broadway), New York, United States
- Glenham Branch (Wyndham Branch), New Zealand
  - Glenham is a rural settlement in eastern Southland, New Zealand, where the branch once ended

== See also ==
- Glemham
