= List of prisoners of the Tower of London =

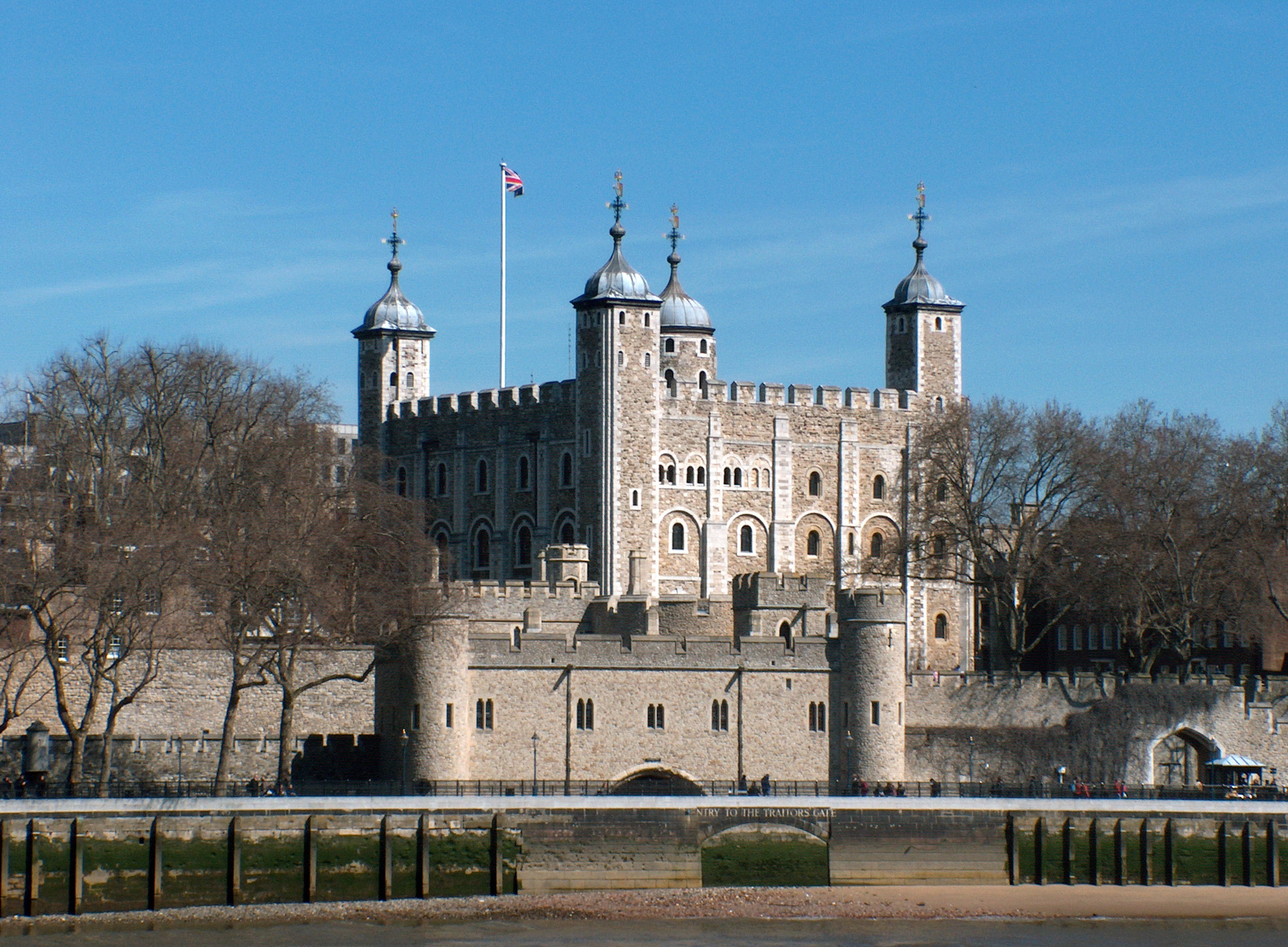
The Tower of London

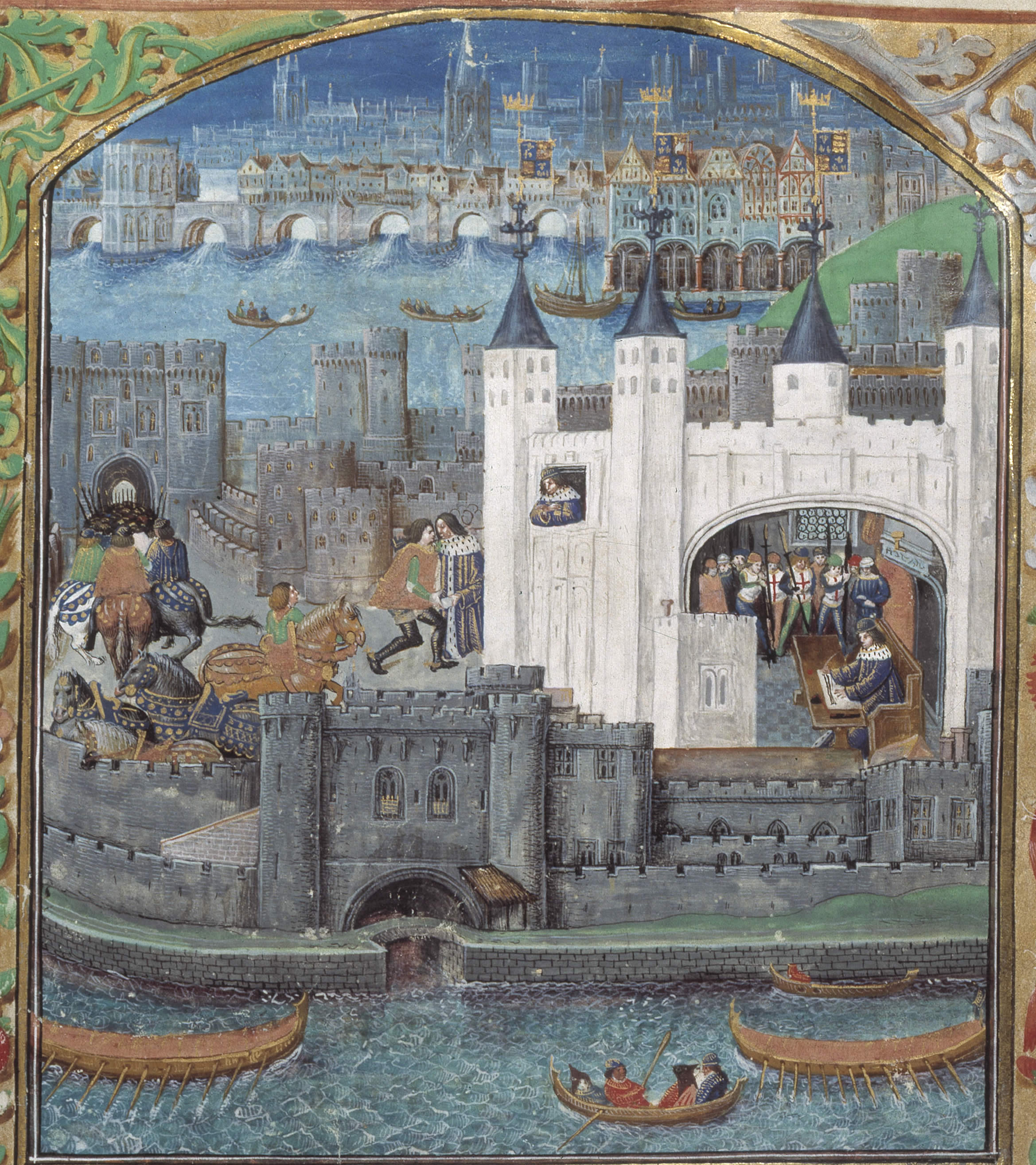
The 15th century Tower in a manuscript of poems by Charles, Duke of Orléans (1391-1465) commemorating his imprisonment there (British Library).

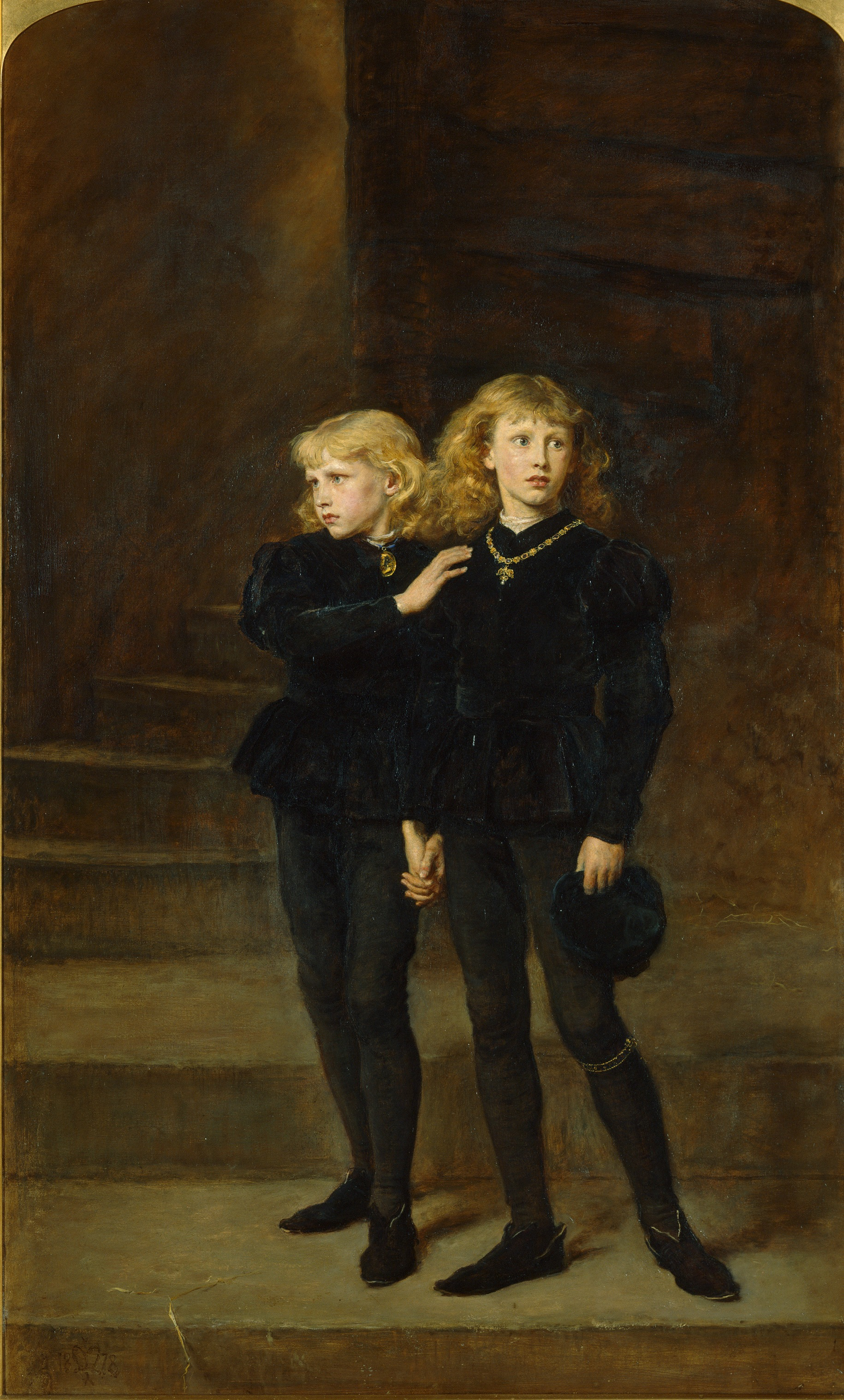
The Two Princes Edward and Richard in the Tower, 1483 by Sir John Everett Millais, 1878, part of the Royal Holloway picture collection

From an early stage of its history, one of the functions of the Tower of London has been to act as a prison, though it was not designed as one. The earliest known prisoner was Ranulf Flambard in 1100 who, as Bishop of Durham, was found guilty of extortion. He had been responsible for various improvements to the design of the tower after the first architect Gundulf moved back to Rochester. He escaped from the White Tower by climbing down a rope which had been smuggled into his cell in a wine casket.

Other prisoners include:

== 12th century ==
- William, Count of Mortain in 1106 as a prisoner of war.
- Constance of France in 1150 on orders of Geoffrey de Mandeville.
- William Fitz Osbert in 1196 for protesting taxation levied for rescue of Richard I
- John de Courcy in 1199 for rebellion in Ireland.

== 13th century ==
- Hubert de Burgh, 1st Earl of Kent, Regent to Henry III, was imprisoned from 1232 until pardoned in 1234.
- Gruffydd ap Llywelyn Fawr, a Welsh prince, the eldest but illegitimate son of Llywelyn the Great ("Llywelyn Fawr") was imprisoned in 1241. He fell to his death in 1244 whilst trying to escape.
- John of Scotland (John de Balliol) - after being forced to abdicate the crown of Scotland by Edward I he was imprisoned in the Tower from 1296 to 1299.
- William 'le hardi' Douglas, Lord of Douglas and Scots governor of Berwick-upon-Tweed, imprisoned 1297, murdered in the Tower 1298.

== 14th century ==
- William Wallace was imprisoned for a short time before he was executed in 1305.
- David II of Scotland was imprisoned in 1346 after being captured at the Battle of Neville's Cross.
- John Graham, Earl of Menteith imprisoned after Neville's Cross, hanged, drawn and quartered in 1347.
- John II of France was imprisoned after being captured at the Battle of Poitiers in 1356. Released in 1360 to raise his ransom, he returned to England when his son Louis, used as replacement hostage, escaped from captivity in July 1363. Greeted in London with parades and feasts, he fell ill a few months later and died at the Savoy in April 1364.
- Richard II of England used it as a refuge from rebels in 1399 before being taken to Pontefract Castle, where he was murdered.

== 15th century ==
- James I of Scotland, then heir to the Scottish throne, was kidnapped while travelling to France in 1406 and imprisoned in the Tower until 1408 before being transferred to Nottingham Castle.
- The family of Owain Glyndŵr was imprisoned in the Tower in 1409, a year after Glyndŵr had been defeated by Henry IV.
- Charles, Duke of Orléans was imprisoned in various English castles between 1415 and 1440, including the White Tower of the Tower of London as prisoner.
- Henry VI of England was imprisoned in the Tower after his capture between 1465 and 1470 and again in 1471, when he was murdered on 21 May 1471.
- Margaret of Anjou, consort of Henry VI, was imprisoned after being captured at the Battle of Tewkesbury in 1471 until ransomed in 1475.
- George Plantagenet, 1st Duke of Clarence, brother of King Edward IV of England, imprisoned in 1477 for treason and privately executed there in 1478.
- Edward V of England and his brother Richard of Shrewsbury, also known as the Princes in the Tower were sent to the tower in 1483 "for their own protection" after the death of their father by their uncle, Richard Duke of Gloucester and who then, according to popular belief, ordered their deaths.
- Edward Plantagenet, 17th Earl of Warwick, was imprisoned in 1485 by Henry VII and executed in 1499.
- Sir William Stanley helped defeat Richard III at the Battle of Bosworth in 1485. He is often credited as placing Richard III's crown on Henry Tudor's head to become Henry VII. Ten years later in 1495 Henry VII imprisoned the same Sir William Stanley in the Tower, and upon conviction for treason had Sir William executed at Tower Hill.
- Michael An Gof and Thomas Flamank, the leaders of The Cornish Rebellion of 1497 were sent to the Tower before their execution.
- Perkin Warbeck was imprisoned in 1497 alongside the Earl of Warwick. He was executed on the orders of Henry VII in 1499, while trying to escape with the Earl.

== 16th century ==
- Sir William de la Pole. A nephew of Edward IV and thus potential Yorkist claimant to the throne, he was incarcerated at the Tower for 37 years (1502–1539) for allegedly plotting against Henry VII, thus becoming the longest-held prisoner.
- Alice Tankerville (also Tankerfelde). The only woman who escaped the Tower of London on March 23, 1534. She was recaptured and executed for piracy by hanging in chains at the Execution Dock in Wapping.
- Gerald FitzGerald, 9th Earl of Kildare, a powerful Irish lord; held in the Tower in 1526 and again in 1530, and again in 1534; he was executed in 1534 when his son "Silken Thomas" rebelled against the crown.
- Thomas FitzGerald, 10th Earl of Kildare ("Silken Thomas"), held in the Tower from 1535 with five of his uncles until their executions in 1537.
- John Frith, a contemporary of William Tyndale, was imprisoned for 8 months before being tried for heresy and burnt at the stake in Smithfield on 4 July 1533, he is considered to be the first Protestant martyr.
- Saint John Fisher was executed on Tower Hill on 22 June 1535. Thomas Cranmer's consecration as Archbishop of Canterbury had taken place in March 1533, and, a week later, John Fisher was arrested.
- Saint Thomas More was imprisoned on 17 April 1534 for treason. He was executed on 6 July 1535 and his body was buried at the Tower of London.
- Blessed Thomas Abel, chaplain to Queen Catherine of Aragon, was imprisoned for refusing to accept the annulment of her marriage to Henry VIII. He was put to death in Smithfield on 30 July 1540.
- Anne Boleyn, second wife of Henry VIII of England, was imprisoned on 2 May 1536 on charges of High Treason: adultery, incest, and witchcraft. She remained a prisoner until 19 May 1536 when she was beheaded by a French swordsman on Tower Green.
- In 1539, Hugh Latimer opposed Henry VIII's Six Articles, with the result that he was imprisoned in the Tower of London (where he was again in 1546).
- Adam Sedbar, Abbot of Jervaulx, imprisoned in 1537 for taking part in the Pilgrimage of Grace, before being hanged, drawn and quartered.
- Blessed Richard Whiting Abbott of Glastonbury Abbey was imprisoned in 1539 for a short time before being returned to Glastonbury to be hanged, drawn and quartered.
- Blessed Margaret Pole, 8th Countess of Salisbury was imprisoned from 1539 until her beheading in 1541 for treason.
- Thomas Cromwell was imprisoned by Henry VIII in 1540 before his execution.
- Catherine Howard, fifth wife of Henry VIII, was imprisoned in 1542 before her execution.
- Lady Rochford, sister in law to queen Anne Boleyn, held there before her execution with Catherine Howard.
- Anne Askew, Protestant reformer, was imprisoned and tortured for heresy in 1546 before being burnt at the stake.
- Thomas Howard, 3rd Duke of Norfolk, was imprisoned in the Tower and set to be executed at the time of Henry VIII's death in 1547. Edward VI granted him as a reprieve, but he remained in the Tower until pardoned by Mary I in 1553.
- Brian O'Connor Faly, Baron Offaly, was imprisoned in the Marshalsea in 1548 before being moved to the Tower. He escaped in late 1551/early 1552, but was recaptured near the border of Scotland and England.
- Edward Seymour, 1st Duke of Somerset, and his steward Sir John Thynne. Although Somerset was released from the Tower and restored to the Council, he was executed for felony in January 1552 after scheming to overthrow John Dudley, Earl of Warwick's regime.
- Thomas Cranmer, Archbishop of Canterbury, was imprisoned in 1553 before being sent to Oxford in 1554 to be burnt at the stake for heresy.
- Lady Jane Grey, uncrowned Queen of England and her husband Guilford Dudley were imprisoned in the tower from 1553 until 12 February 1554, when they were beheaded by order of Queen Mary I.
- In the reign of Edward VI Stephen Gardiner was imprisoned in the Tower (1548 – 1553) for his failure to conform. Upon Mary's accession to the throne he was restored to his see and made Lord Chancellor.
- The future Queen Elizabeth I was imprisoned for two months in 1554 for her alleged involvement in Wyatt's Rebellion.
- In August 1561 Katherine Grey was imprisoned after her secret marriage to Edward Seymour, 1st Earl of Hertford was revealed. She remained there until November 1564 where she was put under house arrest under William Petre.
- In 1566 Margaret Douglas, Countess of Lennox was sent to the Tower, and was released after the murder of Henry Stuart, Lord Darnley in 1567.
- Henry Wriothesley, 2nd Earl of Southampton was imprisoned from October 1571 to May 1573 for his part in the Ridolfi plot to assassinate Elizabeth I and replace her on the English throne with Mary, Queen of Scots.
- Henry Percy, 8th Earl of Northumberland, for involvement in several pro-Catholic and Marian plots, from November 1571 to after June 1573, a few weeks in late 1582, and from December 1584 to June 21, 1585, when he was found shot to death in his cell; brought in as a suicide.
- Francis Throckmorton, imprisoned in November 1583 as a conspirator to rescue Mary, Queen of Scots.
- Saint Henry Walpole was imprisoned in 1593. While incarcerated in the Salt Tower, he carved his name in the plaster along with those of saints Peter, Paul, Jerome, Ambrose, Augustine, and Gregory the Great. He was put to death in York on 7 April 1595.
- Saint Philip Howard was committed to the Tower of London on 25 April 1585. He died alone on Sunday, 19 October 1595.
- Robert Poley, spy and messenger for the court of Queen Elizabeth I, was imprisoned on the charge of treason. He used his time in the Tower to gather information on his fellow prisoners. He was released a year and a half later.
- Queen Elizabeth imprisoned Anne Vavasour along with Edward de Vere and their illegitimate son, from March to June 1581.
- John Gerard, an English Jesuit priest operating undercover during the reign of Queen Elizabeth I, when Catholics were being persecuted. He was captured in 1594 and tortured and incarcerated in the Salt Tower before making a daring escape by rope across the moat in 1597.
- Valentine Thomas, imprisoned in 1598 after confessing a plot to assassinate Elizabeth I.
- William Wright, another Jesuit priest who was arrested in the aftermath of The Gunpowder Plot.

== 17th century ==
- Henry Wriothesley, 3rd Earl of Southampton imprisoned (like his father had been earlier) and sentenced to death for his part in the Essex Rebellion of 1601 but was lucky to escape execution and be released only with the accession of James I in 1603.
- Sir Walter Raleigh spent thirteen years (1603–1616) imprisoned at the Tower but was able to live in relative comfort in the Bloody Tower with his wife and two children. For some of the time he even grew tobacco on Tower Green, just outside his apartment. While imprisoned, he wrote The History of the World.
- Anthony Standen, compromised diplomat imprisoned after travelling to Italy for King James.
- Guy Fawkes, famous for his part in the Gunpowder Plot, was brought to the Tower in 1605 to be interrogated by a council of the King's Ministers. When he confessed to treason, he was sentenced to be hanged, drawn and quartered in the Old Palace Yard at Westminster; however, he escaped his fate by jumping off the scaffold at the gallows which in turn broke his neck and killed him.
- Sir Everard Digby. Gunpowder Plot conspirator, imprisoned in 1605 until hanged, drawn and quartered in 1606.
- Henry Percy, 9th Earl of Northumberland KG (1564 – 1632) suspected of being part of the Gunpowder Plot of 1605 and spent the next 17 years as a prisoner. He also paid a fine of £30,000.
- Cormac MacBaron O'Neill, a brother of the Earl of Tyrone, was arrested and imprisoned following the Flight of the Earls.
- Niall Garve O'Donnell, an Irish nobleman who had allied with the English against his cousin Red Hugh O'Donnell, was sent to the Tower in October 1609 for instigating O'Doherty's rebellion. His son Naghtan was also imprisoned with him. Both died during imprisonment; Niall in 1626, Naghtan in 1640.
- Matthew Wren, Bishop of Ely was imprisoned from 1642-1660 – during his time in the Tower, he drafted revisions to the Book of Common Prayer
- Nicholas Woodcock spent sixteen months in the "gatehouse and tower" for piloting the first Spanish whaleship to Spitsbergen in 1612.
- Sir Thomas Overbury was imprisoned in the Tower by King James I on 22 April 1613. He died on 15 September 1613 after being poisoned, and his murder resulted in one of the biggest scandals of the era.
- Conn O'Neill, young Irish nobleman of the Ó Néill dynasty, held in the Tower from 1615 due to fears of a rebellion to restore the dynasty's power in Ulster. No record of him exists after 1622.
- Thomas Howard, 14th Earl of Arundel was imprisoned twice. In 1621, he was punished by the Lords for comparing his ancestry to that of Baron Spencer. Charles I imprisoned him again in 1626 for the marriage of his son Henry to Lady Elizabeth Stewart (daughter of Esmé Stewart, 3rd Duke of Lennox) without the king's approval.
- Sir Francis Nethersole, secretary to Elizabeth Stuart, Queen of Bohemia was imprisoned for several months in early 1634 for having offended Charles I by questioning the king's support for his sister.
- William Laud, Archbishop of Canterbury, was imprisoned from 1640 to 1645 before his execution for treason.
- John Barwick, English royalist churchman and Dean of St. Paul's Cathedral, was charged with high treason. He was committed (April 1650) first to the Gatehouse prison at Westminster, and then to the Tower of London. He was released, without any trial, in August 1652.
- Sir Anthony Jackson acted as Herald in proclaiming Charles II as King of England after the execution of Charles I. Captured at the Battle of Worcester, Sir Anthony was committed to the Tower of London in 1651 for "invading this nation with Charles Stuart". He was only released at the beginning of the Restoration in 1659.
- John Lambert, Parliamentary general and politician, led the Army in declaring against Parliament and was appointed Major-General. He was imprisoned in March 1660 after his soldiers fled the March on London. He escaped the Tower within a month, descending a silk rope to a waiting barge. He was recaptured and briefly held in the Tower again before being transferred to Guernsey.
- Major William Rainsborowe, Leveller, was imprisoned in December 1660, on suspicion of treason and released on Bail in February 1661.
- John Downes, regicide and friend of Cromwell. Though he signed the death warrant he escaped execution as he tried to save the King. He was imprisoned from 1660 until his death in 1666.
- Henry Oldenburg, first Secretary to the Royal Society, was imprisoned for one month in 1663 on suspicion of espionage. He had been corresponding with scientists across Europe.
- William Penn, Quaker and future founder of Pennsylvania, was imprisoned for seven months in 1668-69 for pamphleteering.
- Francis Lovelace, governor of New York Colony who was overthrown by the Dutch forces, 1673; on his return in disgrace to England, he was eventually committed to the Tower.
- Samuel Pepys, civil servant and diarist, was imprisoned for six weeks in 1679 for maladministration.
- James Scott, 1st Duke of Monmouth imprisoned and executed in the tower in 1685 following the Monmouth Rebellion.
- Judge Jeffries was imprisoned in 1688-89 after the defection of James II. He died there of kidney disease.

== 18th century ==
- Sir Robert Walpole, future Prime Minister, was imprisoned for six months in 1712 for corruption.
- William Maxwell, 5th Earl of Nithsdale, a Jacobite of the '15, was sprung from the prison by his wife and her maid who kept coming in and out of the Tower so many times that they confused the guards, and the Earl was able to escape the Tower dressed as a woman.
- George Kelly, an Irish Jacobite who was imprisoned in 1722 for involvement in the Atterbury Plot, but escaped in 1736.
- Simon Fraser, 11th Lord Lovat was imprisoned in 1746 after being captured at the Battle of Culloden before his execution in 1747.
- Flora MacDonald, a Scottish Jacobite, was imprisoned from 1746 to 1747 for assisting Charles Edward Stuart (Bonnie Prince Charlie) after Culloden.
- Sir John Douglas, 3rd Baronet of Kelhead was arrested in July 1746 on suspicion of having favoured the cause of the Pretender, Charles Edward Stuart, and was, on 14 August, committed to the Tower. He was given bail in March 1748.
- Stephen Sayre, an American resident of London, was arrested in 1775 for high treason in an alleged plot to kidnap King George III.
- Henry Laurens, the third President of the Continental Congress of Colonial America, was imprisoned in 1780 for treason.
- Lord George Gordon, instigator of the Gordon Riots in 1780, spent 6 months in the Tower while awaiting trial on the charge of high treason.
- Johan Anders Jägerhorn, a Swedish officer from Finland and friend of Lord Edward FitzGerald, spent two years in the Tower (1799–1801) for participating in the Irish independence movement, but was released because of Russian interests.
- Francis Burdett (1770–1844), a British politician.

== 19th century ==
- Sir Francis Burdett
- Cato Street Conspirators

== 20th century ==
- Fenner Brockway; British peace campaigner and later a politician who was imprisoned as a conscientious objector
- German spies executed during World War I:
  - Carl Hans Lody, 37, shot by firing squad on 6 November 1914
  - Carl Frederick Muller, 57, shot by firing squad on 23 June 1915
  - Haicke Petrus Marinus Janssen, 30, and Willem Johannes Roos, age unknown, of Dutch origin, shot by firing squad on 30 July 1915
  - Ernst Waldemar Melin, 52, of Swedish origin, shot by firing squad on 10 September 1915
  - Augusto Alfredo Roggen, 34, of Uruguayan origin, shot by firing squad on 17 September 1915
  - Fernando Buschmann, age unknown, of Brazilian origin, shot by firing squad on 19 October 1915
  - George Traugott Breeckow, age unknown, of Dutch origin, shot by firing squad on 26 October 1915
  - "Irving Guy Ries" (real name unknown), 25, of American origin, shot by firing squad on 27 October 1915
  - Albert Meyer, age unknown, of Jewish origin (nationality unknown), shot by firing squad on 2 December 1915
  - Ludovico Hurwitz y Zender, 38, of Peruvian origin, shot by firing squad on 11 April 1916
- Roger Casement was imprisoned for buying guns from Germany to support the Easter Rising, in 1916.
- Norman Baillie-Stewart was a British officer caught selling military secrets to Germany and was held in the Tower in 1933 prior to his trial. He was not executed, because England was not at war with Germany.
- The last state prisoner to be held in the Tower, Rudolf Hess, the deputy leader of the Nazi Party, in May 1941.
- The last person to be executed in the Tower, Josef Jakobs, Nazi spy, shot by a firing squad on 15 August 1941.
- The last people to be held in the Tower, the Kray twins. They were imprisoned for a few days in 1952 for failing to report for national service.
