= Aldeburgh (constituency) =

Parliamentary constituency in the United Kingdom, 1801–1832

- Former borough constituency for the House of Commons
- County: Suffolk
- Borough: Aldeburgh

1571–1832
- Seats: 2
- Replaced by: East Suffolk

Aldeburgh in Suffolk, was a parliamentary borough represented in the House of Commons of the Parliament of the United Kingdom and its predecessor bodies.

== History ==
The town was enfranchised in 1571 as a borough constituency in the House of Commons of the Parliament of England and continued in the Parliaments of Great Britain and the United Kingdom until it was abolished in 1832 as a rotten borough.

It was represented by two burgesses. The right to vote was vested in the town's freemen, although the electoral roll was controlled by the Corporation of Aldeburgh which consisted of two bailiffs (the returning officers), 12 aldermen, and 24 common councilmen. Originally it had been strongly influenced by the Howard family and although the family lost some power due to their Catholicism the Arundel family were still nominating MPs in the seventeenth century. It gradually fell under the control of the Tory Henry Johnson who with his brother represented it for 30 years from 1689 although Whig political influence was growing and after unsuccessful challenges in 1708 and 1713 the borough was captured after the brothers' death by the Whigs at a reputed cost of £9,000. By the mid-18th century it had been "stolen" from being a Government influenced seat by a City of London merchant, Thomas Fonnereau: and later came under the control of his cousin Philip Champion Crespigny who sold it for £39,000 and eventually it devolved to the control of the Marquess of Hertford.

It was described as "a venal little borough in Suffolk".

== Boundaries ==
The constituency comprised the parliamentary borough of Aldeburgh, in the county of Suffolk in Eastern England.

== Members of Parliament ==
=== MPs 1571–1640 ===
Parliament	First member	Second member
1571	Roger Woodhouse	Robert Higford
1572	Francis Beaumont	Charles Seckford
1584	Peter Osborne	John Foxe
1586	Peter Osborne	Edmond Bell
1588	Edward Coke	William Bence
1593	Thomas Knyvet	William Bence
1597	Francis Harvey	Francis Johnson
1601	Martin Stutteville	Francis Corbet
1604–1611	Sir William Woodhouse	Thomas Ryvett
1614	Sir William Woodhouse	Sir Henry Glemham
1621–1622	Sir Henry Glemham	Charles Glemham
1624	Nicholas Ryvett	John Bence
1625	Sir Thomas Glemham	Charles Glemham
1626	Sir Thomas Glemham	William Mason
1628	Sir Simon Steward	Marmaduke Rawden
1629–1640	No Parliaments summoned	

=== MPs 1640–1832 ===
Year	First member	First party	Second member	Second party
April 1640	William Rainsborough	Parliamentarian	Squire Bence	Parliamentarian
November 1640	William Rainsborough	Parliamentarian	Alexander Bence	Parliamentarian
1642	Squire Bence	Parliamentarian	Alexander Bence	Parliamentarian
November 1648	Squire Bence died, November 1648 - seat vacant		Alexander Bence	Parliamentarian
December 1648	Squire Bence died, November 1648 - seat vacant		Alexander Bence excluded in Pride's Purge - seat vacant	
1653	Aldeburgh was unrepresented in the Barebones Parliament and the First and Second Parliaments of the Protectorate			
January 1659	Laurence Oxburgh		John Bence	
May 1659	Not represented in the restored Rump			
April 1660	Sir Robert Brooke		Thomas Bacon	
1661	Sir Robert Brooke		Sir John Holland, Bt	
1669	John Bence		Sir John Holland, Bt	
February 1679	Sir Richard Haddock		Henry Johnson	
August 1679	John Bence		John Corrance	
1685	John Bence		Sir Henry Bedingfield	Tory
1689	Sir Henry Johnson	Tory	William Johnson	Tory
1718 by-election	Sir Henry Johnson	Tory	Samuel Lowe	Whig
1719 by-election	Walter Plumer		Samuel Lowe	Whig
1727	William Windham		Samuel Lowe	Whig
1730 by-election	Sir John Williams	Tory	Samuel Lowe	Whig
1732 by-election	Sir John Williams	Tory	Captain George Purvis	Whig
1734	William Conolly	Whig	Captain George Purvis	Whig
March 1741 by-election	William Conolly	Whig	Francis Gashry	Whig
May 1741	William Conolly	Whig	Richard Plumer	
1747	William Windham		Zachary Philip Fonnereau	
1761	Philip Fonnereau		Zachary Philip Fonnereau	
1768	Nicholas Linwood		Zachary Philip Fonnereau	
1773 by-election	Thomas Fonnereau		Zachary Philip Fonnereau	
1774	Thomas Fonnereau		Richard Combe	
1779 by-election	Martyn Fonnereau		Richard Combe	
1780	Martyn Fonnereau		Philip Champion Crespigny	Whig
1784	Samuel Salt	Whig	Philip Champion Crespigny	Whig
1790	Lord Grey of Groby	Whig	Thomas Grenville	Whig
1796	Sir John Aubrey, Bt	Whig	Michael Angelo Taylor	Whig
1800 by-election	Sir John Aubrey, Bt	Whig	George Johnstone	
1802	Sir John Aubrey, Bt	Whig	John McMahon	Tory
April 1812 by-election	Sir John Aubrey, Bt	Whig	Sandford Graham	
October 1812	The Lord Dufferin & Claneboye	Tory	Andrew Strahan	Tory
1818	Samuel Walker	Tory	Joshua Walker	Tory
1820	James Blair	Tory	Joshua Walker	Tory
1826	John Wilson Croker	Tory	Joshua Walker	Tory
1827 by-election	Wyndham Lewis	Tory	Joshua Walker	Tory
February 1829 by-election	Marquess of Douro	Tory	Joshua Walker	Tory
May 1829 by-election	Marquess of Douro	Tory	Spencer Horsey Kilderbee	Tory
1830	Marquess of Douro	Tory	John Wilson Croker	Tory
1832	Constituency abolished			

== Election results ==
=== Elections in the 1830s ===
General election 1831: Aldeburgh
Party	Candidate	Votes	%
Tory	Arthur Wellesley	Unopposed	
Tory	John Wilson Croker	Unopposed	
Registered electors		c. 65	
Tory hold			
Tory hold			

General election 1830: Aldeburgh
Party	Candidate	Votes	%
Tory	Arthur Wellesley	Unopposed	
Tory	John Wilson Croker	Unopposed	
Tory hold			
Tory hold			

== See also ==
- List of former United Kingdom Parliament constituencies
- Unreformed House of Commons
