= Samuel Lowe =

British politician

Samuel Lowe (c. 1693–1731) of Goadby Marwood was a British politician who sat in the House of Commons from 1718 to 1731.

Lowe was the son of Henry Lowe of Goadby Marwood and his wife Elizabeth Long, daughter of Samuel Long of Jamaica, and nephew of Charles Long. He matriculated at Christ Church, Oxford on 21 April 1710, aged 16 and was admitted at Middle Temple in 1711. He succeeded his father in 1714 and also inherited extensive sugar plantations in Jamaica

Lowe was appointed Comptroller of the Ordnance for Ireland in 1718 and held the post until 1730. He was elected Member of Parliament for Aldburgh as Whig at a by-election on 24 November 1718. He generally voted with the government. At the general elections of 1722 and 1727 he was returned unopposed for Aldeburgh. By this time he had gone over to support the opposition.

Lowe died unmarried on 19 July 1731, leaving his fortune to his two sisters, one of whom married Theobald Taaffe.

Parliament of Great Britain
Preceded by Sir Henry Johnson; William Johnson	Member of Parliament for Aldburgh; 1718–1731; With: Sir Henry Johnson 1715-1719; Walter Plumer 1719-1727; William Windham 1727-1730; Sir John Williams 1730-1731	Succeeded by Sir John Williams; Captain George Purvis
