= Francis Gashry =

British official and Whig politician

Francis Gashry (14 November 1702 – 1762) of Hollybush House, Parsons Green, London was a British official and Whig politician who sat in the House of Commons from 1741 to 1762.

Gashry was the son of Francis Gascherie, perfumer, of Lamb's St, Stepney and his wife Susanna. Gashry's parents both originated from La Rochelle, France and his father was naturalized in 1709 as ‘Gascherye’...

Gashry was Inspector of the captains’ journals and secretary to Sir Charles Wager in 1737, when Wager was first Lord of the Admiralty and was himself commissioner for sick and hurt seamen. He continued in Wager's service when Wager was assistant secretary to the Admiralty in 1738. Wager brought Gashry in as Member of Parliament for Aldeburgh at a by-election on 30 March 1741 and promoted him as a commissioner of the navy in 1741. At the 1741 British general election Gashry was returned unopposed as Wager's candidate at East Looe on the interest of Edward Trelawny. In 1742 he appeared before a secret committee appointed to inquire into Walpole's Administration to give evidence on the payment of secret service money during Wager's election for Westminster in 1741. He was appointed comptroller of victualling accounts in 1744. In 1747 he resigned his office which, under the Place Act 1742, was about to become incompatible with a seat in the Commons. At the 1747 British general election he was returned unopposed again for East Looe. When Trelawny went to Jamaica as governor, Gashry became the intermediary between the Government and the Trelawny family, and also personal agent for the governor.

Gashry married before 1747, Martha Bolton, widow of Charles Bolton, who was a nephew of Admiral Charles Wager. Through his wife, Gashry succeeded to manor of Rotherhithe, and to Kilmenath, near Looe, when Wager's widow died in 1748. He became a director for the South Sea Company in 1749 and was appointed treasurer and paymaster of the Ordnance in 1751.

Gashry was returned unopposed as MP for East Looe at the 1754 British general election. As director of the South Sea Company and Treasurer of the Ordnance, he was consulted by Newcastle on financial matters and subscribed to Government loans. He was returned unopposed at the 1761 British general election. There is no record of his having spoken in Parliament.

Gashry died without issue on 19 May 1762 having long been in a declining state.

Political offices
Preceded by John Plumptre	Treasurer of the Ordnance; 1751–1762	Succeeded by Charles Jenkinson
Parliament of Great Britain
Preceded by William Conolly; Captain George Purvis	Member of Parliament for Aldeburgh; March–April 1741; With: William Conolly	Succeeded by William Conolly; Richard Plumer
Preceded by Charles Longueville; Henry Legge	Member of Parliament for East Looe; 1741–1762; With: James Buller 1741-1747; John Buller 1747-1762	Succeeded by The Viscount Palmerston; John Buller
