= Henry Glemham (politician) =

English politician

Sir Henry Glemham (died 30 August 1632) was an English politician who sat in the House of Commons at various times between 1593 and 1622.

== Biography ==
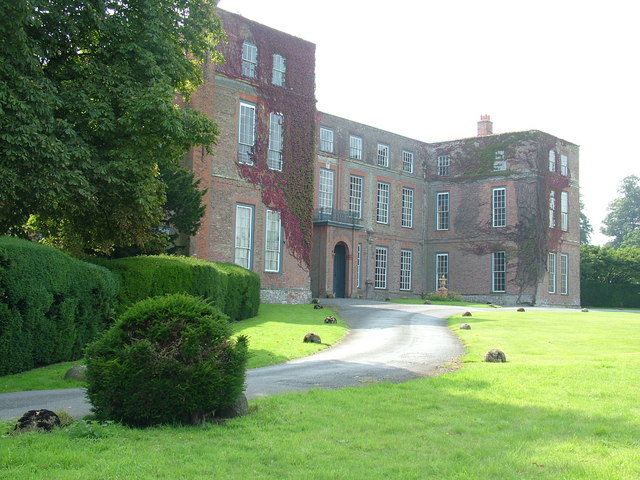
Little Glemham Hall, Suffolk

Glemham was the eldest son of Thomas Glemham of Glemham Hall, Suffolk and his wife Amy Parker, daughter of Henry Parker, 10th Baron Morley. He was a minor when he inherited the estate of Glemham on the death of his father in 1571. He entered Inner Temple in 1585. He was knighted in 1591. In 1593, he was elected Member of Parliament for Lewes. He was re-elected MP for Lewes in 1597.

In 1600 Glemham obtained a licence to travel abroad and visited Rome to help his fellow-countrymen. When he arrived in Rome, he was imprisoned as a suspected spy and only released through the efforts of the Jesuit Robert Persons. Queen Elizabeth heard of Glemham's meeting with Persons, and Glemham was put in the Fleet Prison on his return to England. Glemham's father in law Lord Buckhurst intervened and Glemham was eventually released. In 1601 he was elected knight of the shire for Suffolk. He was a J.P. for Suffolk and commissioner for musters in 1601. In 1604 he was elected Member of Parliament for Ipswich and was a Deputy Lieutenant by 1613. In 1614 he was elected a Member for Aldeburgh and was elected again for Aldeburgh in 1621.

Glemham married Lady Anne Sackville, a daughter of Thomas Sackville, 1st Earl of Dorset, by 1589. Lady Anne and her sister Mary Nevill and friends including Elizabeth Grey had a high reputation for learning, which John Chamberlain satirically suggested was due to their admirers. When they came to visit Ware Park in April 1606, he described them as a throng of "complete women for learning, language, and all other rare qualities - if you may believe their servants, that set them out as if they were to be sold."

They had two sons, Thomas and Henry, and three daughters. One daughter, Anne, married Paul Bayning, 1st Viscount Bayning, and was the grandmother of King Charles II's mistress Barbara Villiers.

Parliament of England
Preceded by Robert Sackville; John Shurley	Member of Parliament for Lewes; 1593–1601; With: George Goring (1593–1597); John Shurley (1597–1601)	Succeeded by George Goring; Percival Hart
Preceded by Sir Thomas Waldegrave; Henry Warner	Member of Parliament for Suffolk; 1601; With: Calthrop Parker	Succeeded by Sir John Heigham; Sir Robert Drury
Preceded by Michael Stanhope; Francis Bacon	Member of Parliament for Ipswich; 1604; With: Sir Francis Bacon	Succeeded by William Cage; Robert Snelling
Preceded by Sir William Woodhouse; Thomas Revett	Member of Parliament for Aldeburgh; 1614–1622; With: Sir William Woodhouse 1614; Charles Glemham 1621–1622	Succeeded by Nicholas Ryvett; John Bence
