= George Purvis =

Captain George Purvis MP

Member of Parliament for Aldeburgh
- In office 1732–1741

Personal details
- Born: 27 July 1680
- Died: 8 March 1741 (aged 60) Islington

Military service
- Allegiance: Kingdom of Great Britain
- Branch/service: Royal Navy
- Years of service: c.1707–1741
- Rank: Captain
- Commands: HMS Dunkirk's Prize; HMS Coventry; HMS Portland; HMS Dursley Galley; HMS Monmouth; Commissioner of the Navy
- Battles/wars: War of the Spanish Succession; Anglo-Spanish War; Thirteenth siege of Gibraltar

Captain George Purvis (27 July 1680 – 8 March 1741), of Darsham, Suffolk, was a Royal Navy officer and Whig politician who sat in the House of Commons from 1732 to 1741.

Purvis was the eldest son of George Purvis of Darsham and his wife Margaret Berry daughter of George Dakins, and widow of a brother of Admiral Sir John Berry. He joined the Royal Navy and was a Captain in 1709, serving under Sir Charles Wager in the West Indies and at Gibraltar. He married Elizabeth Allen of Yoxford, Suffolk on 3 February 1712. In 1715, he succeeded his father to Darsham.

Purvis was the protégé of Wager and was returned unopposed as Whig Member of Parliament for Aldeburgh at a by-election on 21 January 1732. He was returned unopposed there again at the 1734 British general election. In 1735 he was appointed Commissioner of the Navy. In Parliament he looked after the Admiralty interest and voted with the Government on all known occasions.

Purvis died at Islington on 8 March 1741, leaving three sons and a daughter:

- Charles Wager Purvis.- his heir named after Sir Charles Wager
- George Purvis - father of John Child Purvis.
- Harvey Purvis
- Martha Purvis who married Thomas Pearse

Parliament of Great Britain
Preceded by Sir John Williams; Samuel Lowe	Member of Parliament for Aldeburgh; 1732–1741; With: Sir John Williams; William Conolly 1734	Succeeded by William Conolly; Francis Gashry
