= Henry Glemham =

English bishop

Henry Glemham (Glenham) (c.1603 – 17 January 1670) was an English royalist churchman, Dean of Bristol and Bishop of St Asaph.

== Life ==
Glemham was the son of Sir Henry Glemham of Glemham Hall, Suffolk. He was educated at Trinity College, Oxford, where he matriculated on 15 October 1619, aged 16. He graduated B.A. in 1621, and M.A. in 1624. He proceeded B.D. in 1631 and D.D. in 1633.

Glemham became rector of Symondsbury, Dorset, in 1631, leaving in 1645 when his brother Thomas was a prominent royalist figure. He regained the rectory there in 1660. He also became Dean of Bristol in 1660. In 1667 he was made Bishop of St Asaph, and became also rector of Llandrinio. He died at Glemham Hall.

== Sources ==
- "Glemham, Henry (GLMN620H)". A Cambridge Alumni Database. University of Cambridge.
