= Charles Glemham =

English courtier and politician

Sir Charles Glemham (c. 1577 – 1625) was an English courtier and politician who sat in the House of Commons from 1621 to 1625.

Glemham was the son of Christopher Glemham of Glemham, Suffolk. He matriculated at Exeter College, Oxford on 4 May 1593, aged 16.

In 1621, he was elected Member of Parliament for Aldeburgh. In 1622 he had licence to travel to the East Indies. He was elected MP for Newcastle-under-Lyme in 1624 and Aldeburgh for a second time in the Useless Parliament of 1625.

He was knighted on 6 May 1625 and was Master of the Household in 1625.

He died at Plymouth in September 1625.

Parliament of England
Preceded by Sir William Woodhouse; Sir Henry Glemham	Member of Parliament for Aldeburgh; 1621–1622; With: Sir Henry Glemham	Succeeded by Nicholas Ryvett; John Bence
Preceded by Nicholas Ryvett; John Bence	Member of Parliament for Aldeburgh; 1625; With: Sir Thomas Glemham	Succeeded by Sir Thomas Glemham; William Mason
