= William Windham (of Earsham, senior) =

British Army officer and politician (c. 1674–1730)

William Windham (c. 1674 – 2 April 1730), of Earsham, Norfolk, was a British Army officer, landowner and politician who sat in the House of Commons from 1722 to 1730.

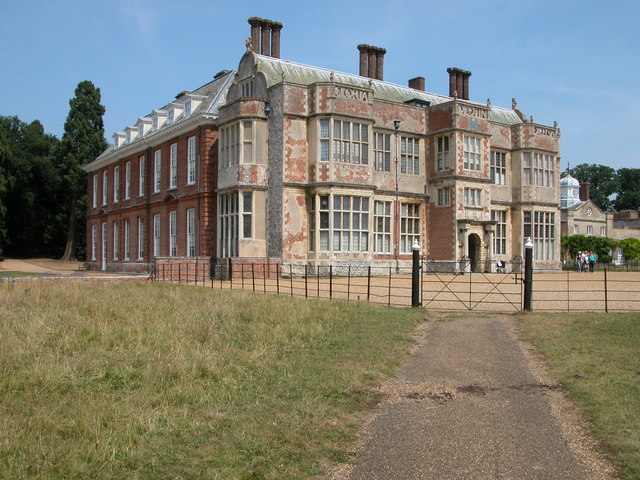
Felbrigg Hall

Windham was the second son of William Windham, of Felbrigg Hall (died 1689) and his wife Catherine Ashe, daughter of Sir Joseph Ashe, 1st Baronet, MP, merchant of Twickenham. He was educated at Eton College in about 1685.

Windham entered the army and was a Cornet in the 6th Dragoon Guards in 1698 and Captain in 1702, serving under the Duke of Marlborough. At the Battle of Blenheim in 1704, he lost a leg. In September 1705, he married Anne Tyrrell, daughter of Sir Charles Tyrrell, 2nd Baronet. He became a lieutenant-colonel in 1706 and by 1712 he was in the reserve. In 1720, he bought an estate at Earsham, including Earsham Hall out of the profits he made from the South Sea bubble.

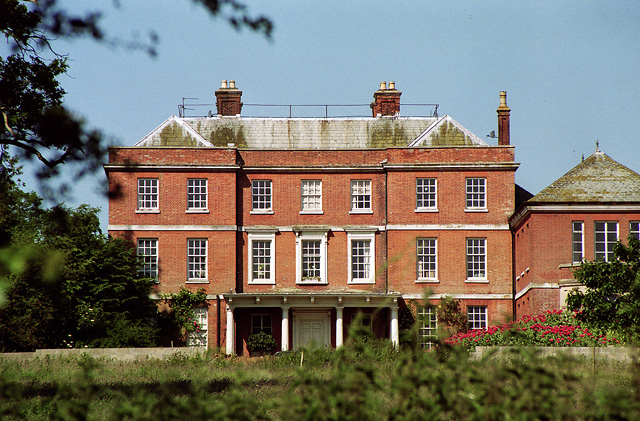
Earsham Hall

At the 1722 British general election, Windham was returned as Member of Parliament for Sudbury. He obtained a place as Lieutenant-governor of Chelsea Hospital in 1726 and his salary was increased from £200 to £400 'in view of his sufferings in the service'. At the 1727 British general election he transferred to Aldeburgh where he was returned as MP on the Treasury interest.

Windham died on 22 April 1730, leaving two sons William, MP, and John, later John Windham-Bowyer, and a daughter Catharine, who eloped with the son of the Apothecary in Bungay. There are family memorials in All Saints Church, Earsham.

Parliament of Great Britain
Preceded by Sir Hervey Elwes; Thomas Western	Member of Parliament for Sudbury; 1722–1727; With: John Knight	Succeeded by John Knight; Carteret Leathes
Preceded by Samuel Lowe; Walter Plumer	Member of Parliament for Aldeburgh; 1727 –1730; With: Samuel Lowe	Succeeded by Samuel Lowe; Sir John Williams
