= William Rainsborough =

English naval officer, ambassador and politician

Vice-Admiral William Rainsborowe
- Born: 11 June 1587; St Mary's Whitechapel London, England
- Died: 16 February 1642 (aged 54); St Katharine's by the Tower, Wapping, London, England
- Resting place: St John's Church, Wapping, London, England
- Occupations: Member of Parliament, Sea Mariner, Businessman
- Known for: Adventurer, Vice-Admiral in Royal Navy English Ambassador to Morocco, Freeing White Slaves in Morocco Adventurer

William Rainsborough (usually spelt Rainsborowe; 11 June 1587 – 16 February 1642), was an English Captain and Vice-Admiral in the Royal Navy, English ambassador to Morocco and politician who sat in the House of Commons from 1640 to 1642.

== 1637 naval expedition against Salé ==
On the orders of Charles I of England, Rainsborowe led a successful naval expedition against the Barbary corsairs of Salé in North West Morocco in June 1637. The squadron comprised four of the warships of Charles I (the Leopard under Vice-Admiral William Rainsborowe, the Antelope under Vice-Admiral George Carteret, the Expedition under Capt. George White and the Providence under Capt. Edmund Seaman or Symonds), together with two privately owned ships (armed merchantmen) - the Hercules (Capt. Brian Harrison) and the Mary (Capt. George Hatch). Two additional English warships were later sent out as reinforcements - the Mary Rose under Capt. Thomas Trenchfield, and the Roebuck under "Master Broad of Rotherhithe". Rainsborowe's exploits were hailed in a court masque designed by Inigo Jones For his services to end white slavery Rainsborowe was offered a hereditary knighthood, which he declined, and was presented with a Gold Chain and Medal by Charles I. Captain Rainsborowe's Emblem was a Saracen's head crest. The Saracen Head as interpreted as 'the head of the foreigner'; the foreigner being the much-feared pirates of the north African coast. Usually referred to as Turks, these marauders were in the white slavery business. This emblem represented Captain Rainsborowe's success at ending White Slavery against the Barbary pirates in Morocco in 1637.

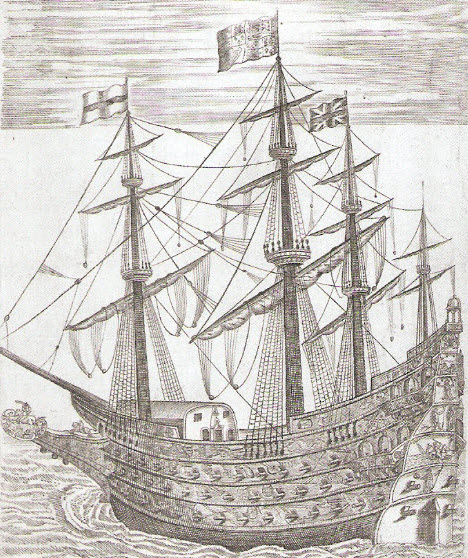
Captain William Rainsborowe's Ship 1638

== MP for Aldeburgh Suffolk 1640 ==
In April 1640, Rainsborowe was elected Member of Parliament for Aldeburgh in the county of Suffolk in the Short Parliament. He was re-elected for Aldeburgh in November 1640 for the Long Parliament and held the seat until his death in 1642.

== Death 1642 ==
Rainsborowe died in 1642 and was buried at St Katharine's by the Tower on 16 February 1642.

== Father of Thomas Rainsborough ==
Rainsborough married Judith Horton, daughter of Renold and Joane Horton. Their sons Thomas and William were political and religious radicals, both of whom fought for Parliament during the Wars of the Three Kingdoms.

== Gallery ==
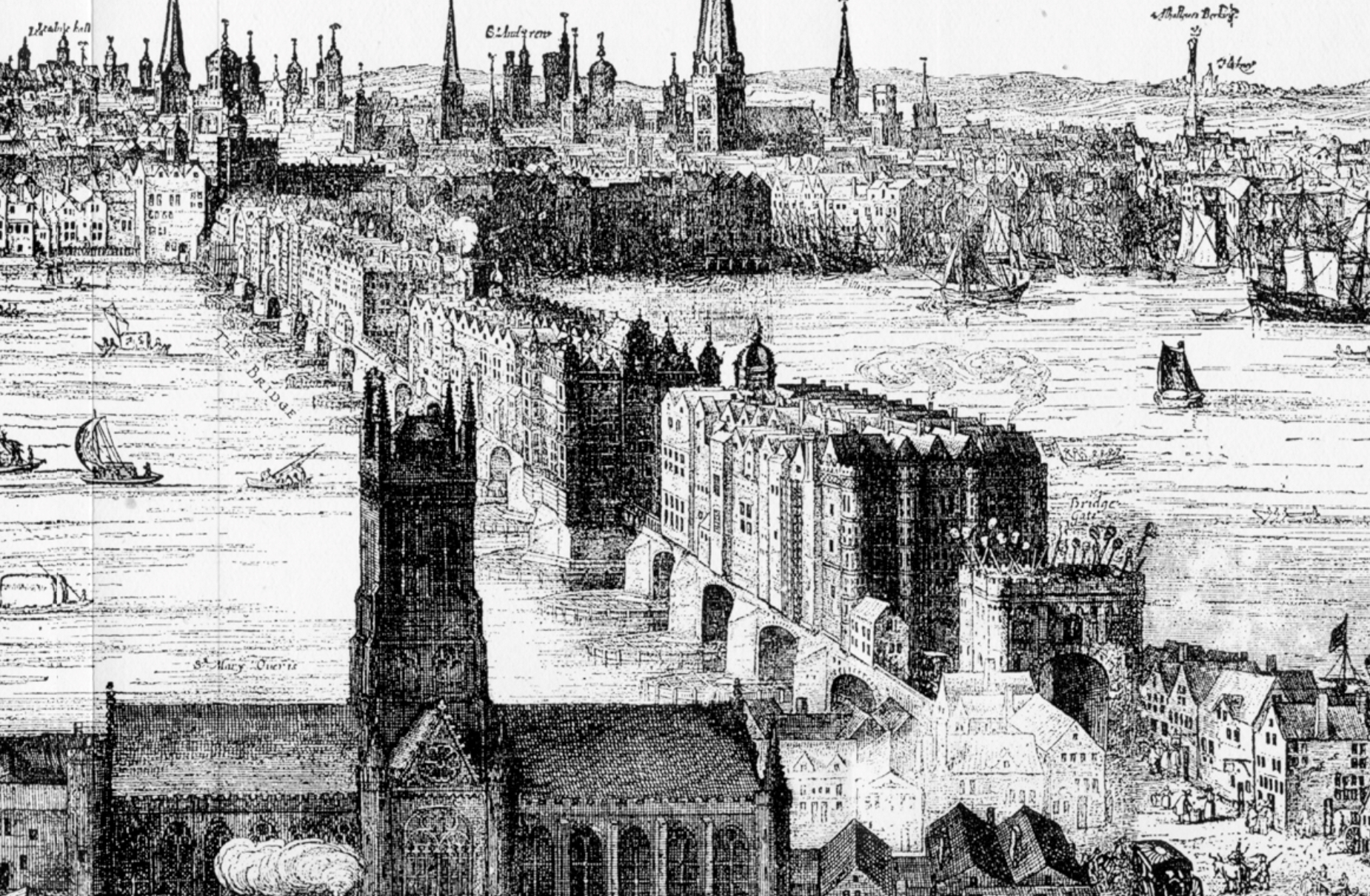
London Bridge in 1630s England

Parliament of England
Vacant Parliament suspended since 1629	Member of Parliament for Aldeburgh; 1640; With: Squire Bence 1640; Alexander Bence 1640–1642	Succeeded by Squire Bence; Alexander Bence
