= Francis Harvey (died 1632) =

Member of the Parliament of England

Sir Francis Harvey (born in 1568, died 2 August 1632) of Cotes, Hardingstone, Northamptonshire, was an English lawyer and Member of Parliament.

He was the eldest surviving son of Stephen Harvey of Cotes, Northamptonshire and educated at Barnard's Inn and the Middle Temple (1582). He was called to the bar in 1591. He succeeded his father in 1606 and was knighted in 1626.

He was a bencher at the Middle Temple in 1609 and reader in 1609 and 1611. He was appointed a serjeant-at-law in 1614 and recorder for Leicester the same year. He was a Justice of the common pleas in 1624.

He was a Member (MP) of the Parliament of England for Aldeburgh, Suffolk in 1597.

He died in 1632 and was buried at Hardingstone, Northampton. He had married twice: firstly Elizabeth Hemming of Hertfordshire, a London widow, with whom he had, with four daughters, a son (who predeceased him in 1630, Sir Stephen Harvey 1600-1630 who married Mary Murden -1709 their daughter Sarah married William Rudyerd the son of Sir Benjamin Rudyerd MP). He married secondly Christian.

Parliament of England
| Preceded by Thomas Knyvet; William Bence | Member of Parliament for Aldeburgh; 1597–1601; With: Francis Johnson | Succeeded by Martin Stutteville; Francis Corbet |
