= Battle of Naseby order of battle =

The following units and commanders fought in the Battle of Naseby during the First English Civil War.

== Parliamentarian New Model Army ==
(6,000 Horse, 1,000 Dragoons, 7,000 Foot, 11 guns)

Lord General Sir Thomas Fairfax

Left Flank

Colonel John Okey's Regiment of Dragoons

Left Wing (Commissary General Henry Ireton)

First Line
Colonel John Butler's Regiment of Horse
Colonel Bartholomew Vermuyden's Regiment of Horse, commanded by Major Huntinton
Commissary General Henry Ireton's Regiment of Horse

Second Line
Colonel Nathaniel Rich's Regiment of Horse
Colonel Charles Fleetwood's Regiment of Horse
Eastern Association Horse (half regiment)

Centre (Sergeant Major General Sir Philip Skippon)

Eleven pieces of artillery

First Line
Sir Philip Skippon's Regiment of Foot
Sir Hardress Waller's Regiment of Foot
Colonel John Pickering's Regiment of Foot
Colonel Edward Montagu's Regiment of Foot
Sir Thomas Fairfax's Regiment of Foot
Forlorn Hope of commanded musketeers

Second Line
Lieutenant Colonel Pride's Regiment of Foot, Described as Colonel Barlet's (Note: The regiment had been Colonel Sir Edward Harley's, intended to be commanded by Colonel Barlet. However, Harley did not serve in 1645 on account for injury and the regiment was commanded by Colonel Pride. Foard, 2004, p.201)
Colonel Robert Hammond's Regiment of Foot
Colonel Thomas Rainsborough's Regiment of Foot

Third Line
Lieutenant Colonel Pride's Reserve

Right Wing (Lieutenant General Oliver Cromwell)

First Line
Colonel Edward Whalley's Regiment of Horse
Sir Robert Pye's Regiment of Horse (one Division) (Note: A "division" of cavalry was a grouping of three or four troops. Most regiments of cavalry in the New Model Army had six troops, and therefore two divisions. Some Royalist divisions would have been amalgamations of very understrength regiments)
Sir Thomas Fairfax's Regiment of Horse
Colonel Edward Rossiter's Regiment of Horse (one Division)

Second Line
Colonel Thomas Sheffield's Regiment of Horse
Sir Robert Pye's Regiment of Horse (one Division)
Colonel John Fiennes's Regiment of Horse (one Division)

Third Line
Eastern Association Horse (half regiment, Suffolk Horse under Col. Gourdon)
Colonel John Fiennes's Regiment of Horse (one Division)
Colonel Edward Rossiter's Regiment of Horse (one Division)

== Royalist Army ==
(4,100+ Horse, 3,300+ Foot)

King Charles I
General of the Army Prince Rupert

Left Wing (Sir Marmaduke Langdale)

Four Divisions of "Northern Horse"
Colonel Sir Horatio Cary's Regiment of Horse

Centre (Lord Astley)

Three divisions of Colonel Sir Thomas Howard's Regiment of Horse

Sir George Lisle's Tertia

Sir George Lisle's Regiment of Foot
Colonel William St. George's Regiment of Foot
The Shrewsbury Foot (the remnants of several regiments returned from Ireland, including Tillier's, Broughton's, Warren's and Gibson's, under Colonel George Smith)

Sir Henry Bard's Tertia

Sir Henry Bard's Regiment of Foot
Colonel Rhys Thomas's Regiment of Foot
Sir John Owen's Regiment of Foot
Colonel Richard Bagot's Regiment of Foot
Colonel Ratcliffe Gerard's Regiment of Foot

Sir Bernard Astley's Tertia (Note: Son of Sergeant-major General Jacob Astley)

The Duke of York's Regiment of Foot
Colonel Sir Edward Hopton's Regiment of Foot
Colonel Sir Richard Page's Regiment of Foot

Right Wing (Prince Maurice)

First Line
Prince Rupert's and Prince Maurice's Lifeguard Troops of Horse
Prince Rupert's Regiment of Horse
The Queen's Regiment of Horse
Prince Maurice's Regiment of Horse

Second Line
The Earl of Northampton's Regiment of Horse
Sir William Vaughan's Regiment of Horse

Reserve (King Charles)

The King's Regiment of Foot
The King's Lifeguard of Horse (Lord Bernard Stuart)
Prince Rupert's Regiment of Foot
