= Bense (surname) =

Bense is a surname. Notable people with the surname include:

- Allan Bense (born 1951), American businessman and politician
- Judith A. Bense (born 1945), American academic
- Max Bense (1910–1990), German philosopher, writer and publicist
- Elisabeth Walther-Bense (1922–2018), German semiotician

== See also ==
- Bense, a village in Dominica
