= Alexander Bence =

English politician

Alexander Bence (born ca. 1590) was an English merchant and politician who sat in the House of Commons of England from 1640 to 1648 and in 1654. He supported the Parliamentarian side in the English Civil War.

== Biography ==
Bence was the son of Alexander Bence and his wife Marie Squier daughter of Thomas Squier.

In November 1640, Bence was elected Member of Parliament for Aldeburgh in the Long Parliament and sat until he was excluded under Pride's Purge. In 1642 he was appointed by parliament as one of the Commissioners for the Affairs of (His Majesty's) Navy, the King having prevented all his principal officers of the navy from performing their duties. Bence was a member of the Worshipful Company of Grocers in the City of London and became an Alderman for Walbrook ward in May, 1653. In 1654 he was elected MP for Suffolk in the First Protectorate Parliament. He was master of Trinity House from 1659 to 1660.

Bence married as his first wife Anne Aylett of Rendham Suffolk and his son by her, John Bence was later also MP for Aldeburgh. Bence's brother Squire Bence was also MP for Aldeburgh during the Long Parliament.

Parliament of England
Preceded by Squire Bence; William Rainsborough	Member of Parliament for Aldeburgh; 1640–1648; With: William Rainsborough; Squire Bence	Succeeded by Not represented in the Rump or Barebones parliaments
Preceded by Jacob Caley; Francis Brewster; Robert Dunken; John Clark; Edward Plumstead	Member of Parliament for Suffolk; 1654; With: Sir William Spring; Sir Thomas Barnardiston; Sir Thomas Bedingfield; William Blois; William Gibbes; John Brandling; John Gurdon; John Sicklemore; Thomas Bacon	Succeeded by Sir William Spring; Sir Thomas Barnardiston; Sir Henry Felton; Henry North; Edmund Harvey; Edward Le Neve; John Sicklemore; William Bloys; William Gibbes; Robert Brewster; Daniel Wall
