= Thomas Glemham =

English soldier, landowner and politician

Sir Thomas Glemham (c. 1594 – 1649) was an English soldier, landowner and politician who sat in the House of Commons between 1621 and 1625. He was a commander in the Royalist army during the English Civil War.

== Early life and career ==
Glemham was the son of Sir Henry Glemham of Glemham Hall, Little Glemham in Suffolk. After studying at Trinity College, Oxford, he "betook himself to the German wars," serving in armies in Europe from 1610 to 1617. He was knighted on 10 September 1617. In 1621 he was elected MP for Reigate. He succeeded his father to the Little Glemham estate in 1632.

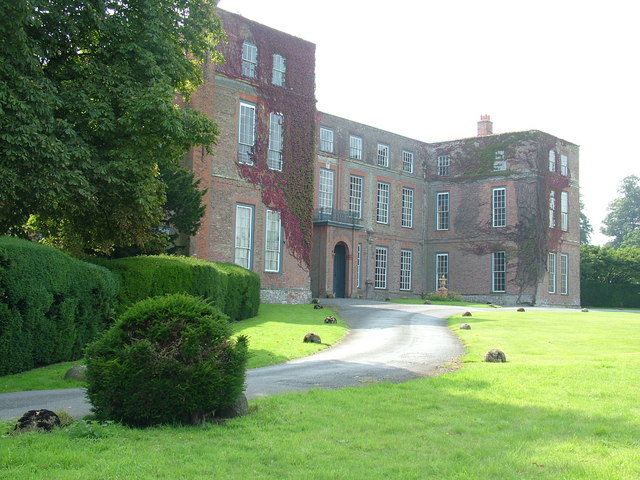
Little Glemham Hall

He was elected MP for Aldeburgh in 1625 and 1626. He then took part as a Captain in the Duke of Buckingham's expedition to La Rochelle. He was captured by the French, but later released. He then served as JP and was involved in several lawsuits and scandals.

In 1639, on the outbreak of the Second Bishops' War Glemham was commissioned a lieutenant-colonel. After the English defeat at the Battle of Newburn, he was Governor of Hull for several months, before returning to London in 1641.

== First Civil War ==
In early 1642, Glemham was part of King Charles's entourage in York. He re-entered Hull unannounced at the head of a large and prestigious party whose purpose was to recover the arms stored there after the Bishops' Wars. The pro-Parliamentarian Governor, Sir John Hotham, thwarted them by inviting them to a lengthy and pointless reception. The impatient King demanded entry to the city and was refused. He proclaimed Hotham a traitor, and Glemham's party was forced to leave.

Glemham remained in the north of England after the King moved south, and took part in the failed Siege of Hull (1642). In October 1642, he was appointed Governor of York, remaining there until November 1643 when he took command in Northumberland to face a possible invasion by Scottish Covenanters. The Scots did invade in January, 1644, in overwhelming strength, and Glemham had to retreat rapidly on the city of Newcastle upon Tyne and the main Royalist army under the Marquess of Newcastle.

The Marquess of Newcastle was himself forced to retreat to York when that city was threatened by Parliamentarian armies. When they arrived on 19 April, Glemham resumed his post as Governor (succeeding Sir John Belasyse, who had been captured earlier in the month). During the ensuing Siege of York, the Royalist garrison defended the city vigorously, and Glemham was credited with destroying a Parliamentarian mine under Walmgate Bar, by digging a counter-mine through which the attackers' mine was flooded. On 1 July the city was relieved by a Royalist army under Prince Rupert of the Rhine. Late the following day, the forces Rupert and Newcastle were decisively defeated at the Battle of Marston Moor. Newcastle went into exile in Hamburg, while Rupert returned south with the survivors of his army. Glemham was left with only 1500 men to defend York. He nevertheless held out until 16 July and obtained favourable terms from the besiegers. No Scottish troops were to enter the city, and such of the garrison as wished to continue to fight were allowed to march out with all the honours of war and were given safe passage to Skipton, where some men marched south to join the King's main forces while Glemham with some 200 "reformadoes" (officers from regiments which had been destroyed or disbanded) went to Carlisle.

Glemham was appointed Commander-in-Chief of the four northernmost counties of England, but effectively controlled only Carlisle itself. From October 1644 to June 1645, Carlisle was closely besieged by Scots under Major General Sir David Leslie. Glemham again maintained an active defence, repeatedly raiding the besiegers' lines. He finally capitulated when all supplies had been eaten and the garrison and townsfolk faced starvation. Leslie again granted favourable terms, allowing all the honours of war and escorting the garrison to Hereford where they might join the King.

Glemham was created D.C.L. at Oxford on 22 April 1645. In October 1645, he was appointed Governor of Oxford, the King's wartime capital. He made extensive preparations to withstand a lengthy siege although by this time, the King had very few forces left to him. In April 1646, the Parliamentarian Commander-in-Chief, Sir Thomas Fairfax, began the final Siege of Oxford. The King left Oxford in disguise. Glemham maintained a defence despite pressure from some of the King's Privy Councillors who were trapped in Oxford to surrender. Both negotiations for a surrender and a furious bombardment of the siege lines were continuing when a letter was received from King Charles, now a prisoner of the Scots, commanding Glemham to cease resistance. The garrison of 3,000 marched out with all honours of war and disbanded. After paying a fine of £951/15/0 to retain his estates, Glemham went into exile.

== Second Civil War ==
Glemham joined other prominent Royalists in Edinburgh in early 1648. In April, they crossed into England and began a Royalist uprising. Glemham once again took command at Carlisle. However, the Scots army which invaded England in their support was defeated at the Battle of Preston, and the bands of northern Royalists were soon suppressed.

Glemham once again went into exile in 1648 and died in Holland in 1649.

== Private life ==
He married twice: firstly in 1619 Catherine, daughter of London merchant Sir Peter Vanlore, with whom he had 3 sons and 3 daughters and secondly in 1630 Mary, the daughter of Thomas Perient of Birch, Essex. He acquired the manor of Burwell, Lincolnshire by his first marriage.

Parliament of England
Preceded by Sir Edward Howard; John Suckling	Member of Parliament for Reigate; 1621–1622; With: Robert Lewis	Succeeded by Robert Lewis; Sir Thomas Bludder
Preceded by Nicholas Ryvett; John Bence	Member of Parliament for Aldeburgh; 1624–1625; With: William Mason	Succeeded by Sir Simon Steward; Marmaduke Rawden
