= Robert Higford =

16th-century English politician

Robert Higford (c. 1530–1572) was an English politician.

He was a member (MP) of the parliament of England for Aldeburgh in 1571.
