= William James Conolly =

Anglo-Irish landowner and politician

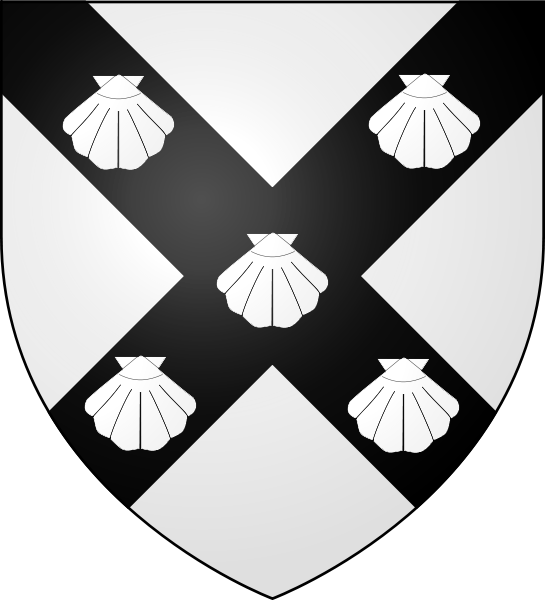
Arms of Conolly: Argent, on a saltire sable five escallops of the field

William James Conolly (died 2 January 1754) was an Irish landowner and Whig politician who sat in the Irish House of Commons from 1727 to 1754 and in the British House of Commons from 1734 to 1754.

== Early life ==
Conolly was a nephew of William Conolly, Speaker of the Irish House of Commons from 1715 to 1729, and was the son of Patrick Conolly, originally of County Donegal, younger brother of William. William and Patrick had fled to England from Ireland in 1688, but while William had returned, Patrick remained and married Frances Hewett, one of the children of Neale Hewett and Mary Halford of Dunton Bassett, Leicestershire. There were two children, William and his sister, and they grew up at Dunton Bassett until 1713 when their father died, having recently buried their mother.

== Career ==
William became cursitor in the Court of Chancery (Ireland) in 1721. He was elected to the Irish House of Commons for Ballyshannon at a by-election in 1727, after his uncle who had been elected in the 1727 Irish general election earlier in the year decided to continue sitting for County Londonderry instead. In 1729, he succeeded to Castletown, the estate of his uncle, who was said to be the richest man in Ireland. He was appointed to the Irish Privy Council on 3 February 1730.

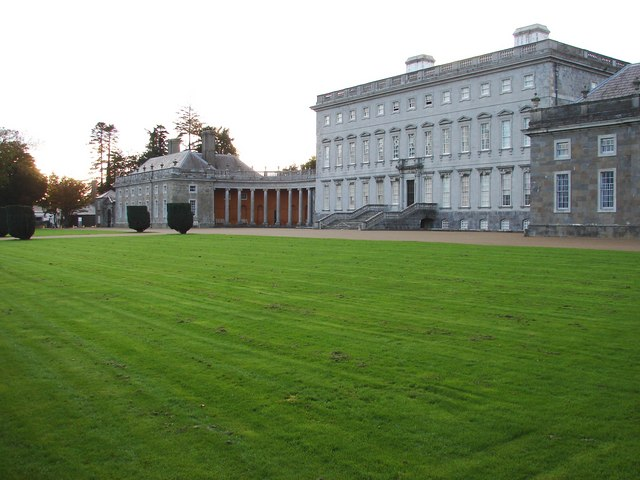
Castletown House

At the 1734 British general election Conolly was returned as Member of Parliament for Aldeburgh in the interest of his father-in-law Lord Strafford. Although Strafford was a Tory, Conolly considered himself "an incorrigible Whig". He voted consistently with the Government and was returned for Aldeburgh in 1741. He was classed as Old Whig in 1746. At the 1747 British general election he changed seats and was returned as MP for Petersfield instead.

== Marriage and issue ==
On 28 April 1733, he married Lady Anne Wentworth, daughter of Thomas Wentworth, 1st Earl of Strafford and his wife Anne Johnson; and in that year he purchased Stretton Hall, Staffordshire as his seat in England, his uncle's great mansion of Castletown in Kildare still being in the hands of his widowed aunt. The couple had a London home in Grosvenor Square.

He had a son and seven daughters.

- Thomas Conolly, who married Lady Louisa Lennox
- Frances, who married William Howe, 5th Viscount Howe
- Katherine, who married Ralph Gore, 1st Earl of Ross;
- Anne, who married George Byng and was the mother of John Byng, 1st Earl of Strafford
- Jane, who married the notoriously eccentric landowner and duellist George Robert FitzGerald ("Fighting FitzGerald") in 1770 and had issue. He was hanged for conspiracy to murder in 1786;
- Lucy, unmarried;
- Harriet, who married John Staples and was grandmother of Edward Michael Conolly
- Caroline, who married John Hobart, 2nd Earl of Buckinghamshire.

Conolly died on 2 January 1754 leaving an estate of £15,000 per annum. The widowed Lady Conolly moved to Boyle Street, Mayfair, London.

Parliament of Ireland
Preceded by William Conolly; Thomas Pearson	Member of Parliament for Ballyshannon; 1727-1754; With: Thomas Pearson 1727-1737; Edward Walpole	Succeeded by Michael Clarke; Edward Walpole
Parliament of Great Britain
Preceded by Sir John Williams; Captain George Purvis	Member of Parliament for Aldeburgh; 1734–1747; With: Captain George Purvis; Francis Gashry 1741; Richard Plumer 1741-1747	Succeeded by William Windham; Zachary Philip Fonnereau
Preceded by John Jolliffe; Francis Fane	Member of Parliament for Petersfield; 1747–1754; With: John Jolliffe	Succeeded by John Jolliffe; William Gerard Hamilton
