= Squire Bence =

English merchant, seafarer and member of the House of Commons (1597–1648)

Squire Bence (15 May 1597 – 27 November 1648) was an English merchant, seafarer and politician who sat in the House of Commons of England from 1640 to 1648.

Bence was the son of Alexander Bence and his wife Marie Squier daughter of Thomas Squier. He was a merchant and shipowner who undertook trading expeditions by sea. Bence Island in the estuary of the Sierra Leone River was named after him. In the 1620s he is recorded as raiding an Algerian ship and removing Christian slaves and prisoners from it.

In April 1640, Bence was elected Member of Parliament for Aldeburgh in the Short Parliament. He was re-elected in 1642 as MP for Aldeburgh when he joined his brother Alexander Bence in the Long Parliament. He sat until his death in 1648. In 1642 he was appointed by parliament as one of the Commissioners for the Affairs of (His Majesty's) Navy, the King having prevented all his principal officers of the navy from performing their duties.

Bence died aged 51 years, 6 months and 12 days at Thorington Suffolk although he is also commemorated on the family monument at Aldeburgh.

Bence married Elizabeth Pett on 26 August 1617 at St. Dunstan, Stepney, London. His second wife was Mary.

Parliament of England
Vacant Parliament suspended since 1629	Member of Parliament for Aldeburgh; 1640, 1642–1648; With: William Rainsborough 1640; Alexander Bence 1642-48	Not represented in the Rump or Barebones parliaments
