= Glemham Hall =

House in Little Glemham, Suffolk, UK

Coordinates: 52.1806°N 1.4307°E

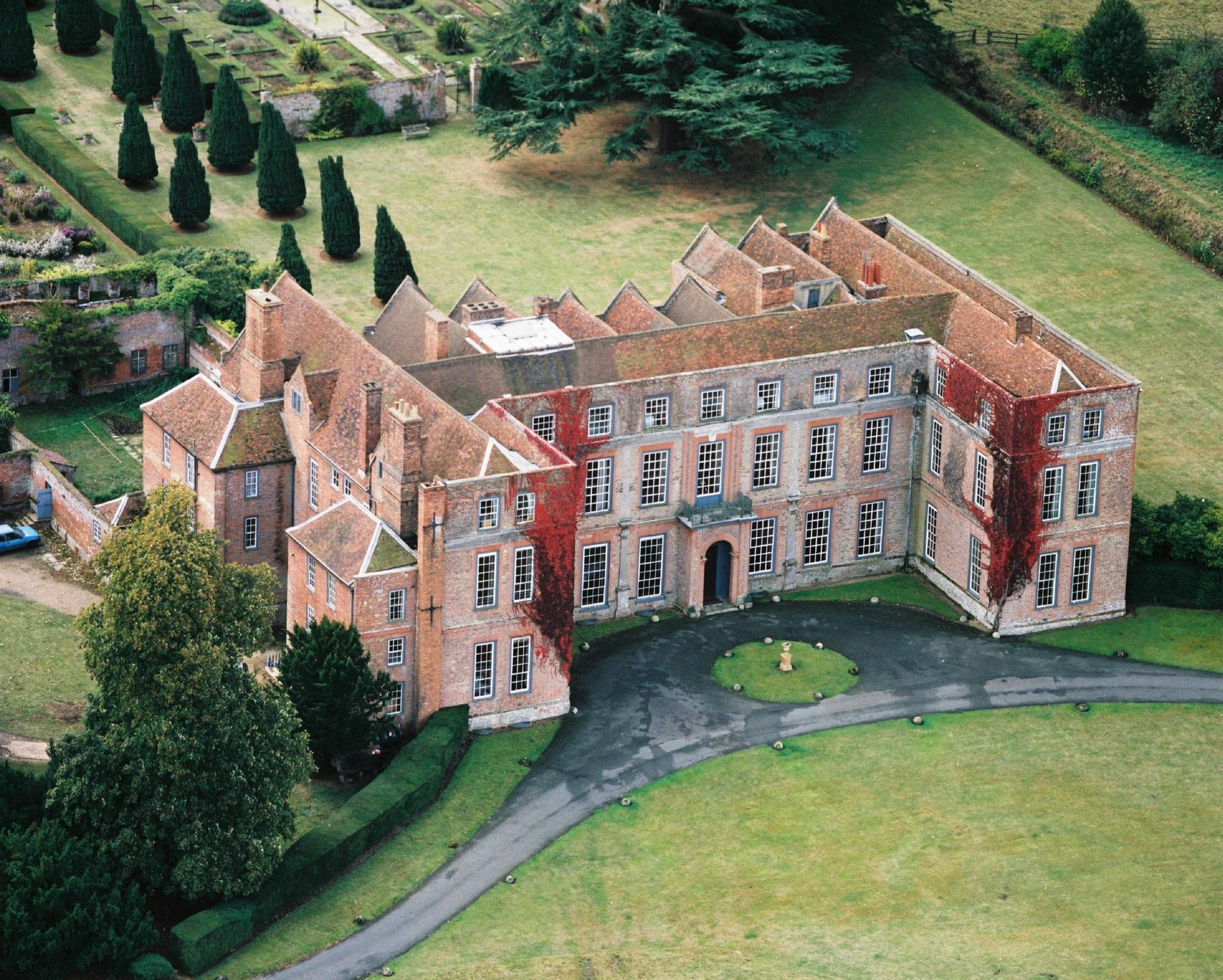
- Glemham Hall from above

- Location within Suffolk
- Alternative names: Little Glemham Hall

General information
- Architectural style: Elizabethan and Georgian
- Location: Little Glemham, Suffolk, England
- Year built: 1560
- Client: Sir Henry Glemham
- Owner: Cobbold family

Listed Building – Grade I
- Official name: Little Glemham Hall
- Designated: 25 October 1951
- Reference no.: 1278507

National Register of Historic Parks and Gardens
- Official name: Glemham Hall
- Designated: 29 March 2000
- Reference no.: 1001461

Glemham Hall or Little Glemham Hall is an Elizabethan and Georgian country house, set in around 300 acres (120 ha) of park land on the outskirts of the village of Little Glemham in Suffolk, England. It is a Grade I listed building.

== History ==
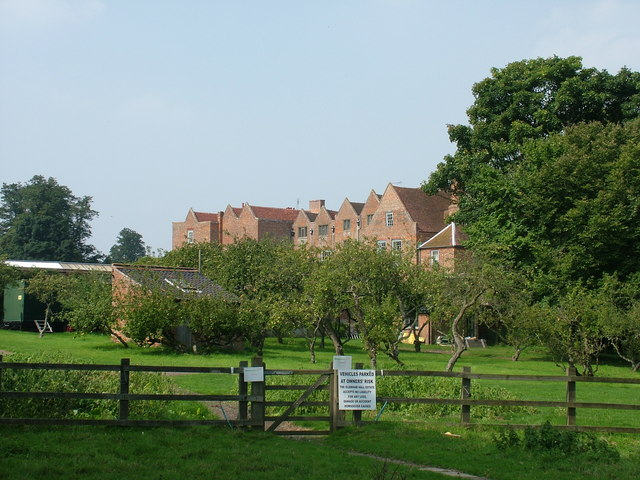
Glemham Hall, rear view

It was built around 1560 by the De Glemham family for Sir Henry Glemham. It was purchased by Francis North, 2nd Baron Guilford of the North family in 1709, whose uncle Dudley North had earlier purchased the lordship of the manor of Little Glemham and Banyards; and between 1712 and 1720 major structural changes were made to the facade, giving it the overall Georgian appearance recognised today.

In 1791 Humphry Repton produced plans for the park; he commented on the H-shaped house in his works. At that time the owner was Dudley Long North. North was a politician and also a patron of George Crabbe, who held benefices at Parham and Great Glemham, and Crabbe met Charles James Fox and Roger Wilbraham at (Little) Glemham Hall; Crabbe lived at Great Glemham Hall, a different property owned by North not far away, for some years from 1796.

In the latter part of the 19th century the Hall was the residence of the MP Alexander George Dickson. It was purchased by the Cobbold family in 1923 in whose hands it has remained ever since. It was offered for sale with Strutt & Parker in 2024, for £19,000,000.

== Openings ==
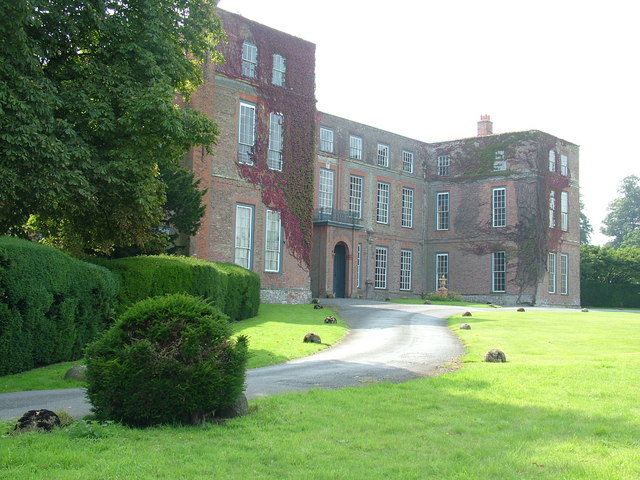
Glemham Hall, front view

It is today used mostly for corporate and social occasions. It is open to the general public 28 days of the year or by a private booking for a guided tour of the house by a member of the Cobbold family. The tour showcases much of the family history, changes to the house and many Ipswich Town Football Club memorabilia.

The gardens are opened separately on selected days throughout the summer. In 2013, The FolkEast Festival began to be held on the parkland at Glemham Hall every August, attracting international acoustic, folk and roots musicians, whilst also championing local businesses, heritage and crafts.
