= Little Glemham =

Village in Suffolk, England

Coordinates: 52.1737°N 1.4220°E

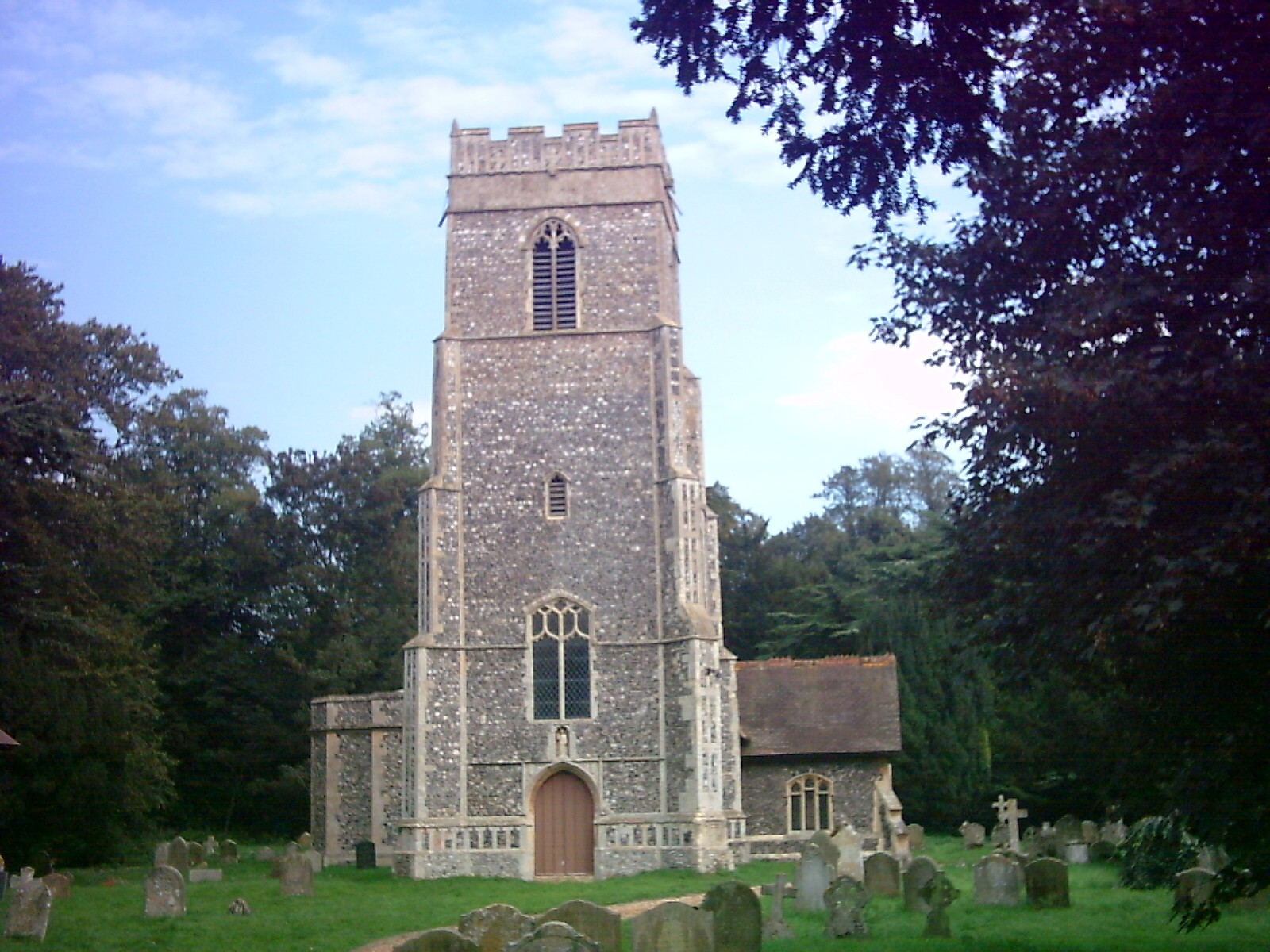

- Location within Suffolk
- Population: 187 (2011 census)
- Civil parish: Little Glemham
- District: East Suffolk
- Shire county: Suffolk
- Region: East
- Country: England
- Sovereign state: United Kingdom

Little Glemham is a small village and civil parish on the A12 road, in the East Suffolk district, in the county of Suffolk, England. The population of the parish at the 2011 Census was 187. Nearby settlements include the villages of Wickham Market and Marlesford. Little Glemham has a church, St. Andrew's, a pub and a hall called Glemham Hall. The corresponding village of Great Glemham is a few miles away. From 1974 to 2019 it was in Suffolk Coastal district.

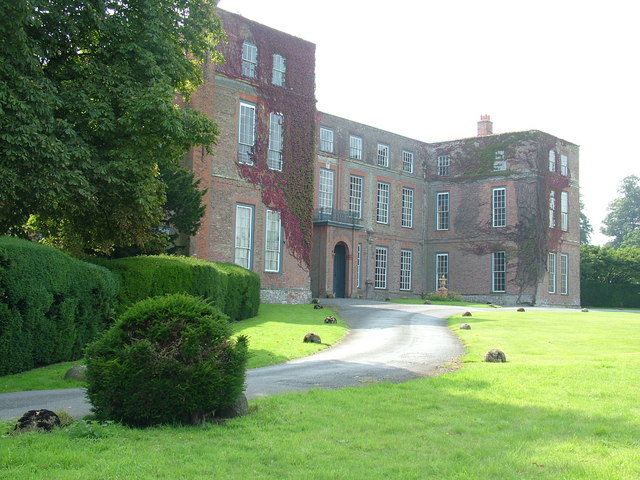
