= John Bence (1622–1688) =

English merchant and politician

John Bence (1622 – 4 March 1688) was an English merchant and politician who sat in the House of Commons at various times between 1659 and 1688.

Bence was the eldest son of Alexander Bence of Aldeburgh, Suffolk and London and his first wife Anne Aylett of Rendham, Suffolk. He was baptised on 3 October 1622. He was a merchant trading with Portugal, Brazil and the Levant. In 1659, he was elected Member of Parliament for Aldeburgh in the Third Protectorate Parliament.

In 1662, Bence went into partnership with Sir Martin Noel as farmer of additional customs duties on wine, tobacco, silk and linen. He succeeded to the property of his father in 1663. He invested £1,500 in the Royal Adventurers into Africa Company, and became secretary of the company by 1665. He was commissioner for assessment for London from 1664 to 1680. He became alderman of London in 1664 and paid £720 to be excused from the office in 1665. He was assistant of the Worshipful Company of Grocers from 1664 to 1687. In 1665 he was appointed with his brother, Sir Alexander Bence of Dublin, as joint receiver of crown rents from all lands in Ireland returned to Roman Catholic proprietors or in which the Adventurers were concerned. He was warden of the Grocers Company from 1667 to 1668 and master of the Grocers Company from 1668 to 1669.

In 1669 Bence defeated Samuel Pepys, the official candidate, in a by-election at Aldeburgh for the Cavalier Parliament. He was assistant of the Royal African Company from 1672 to 1673 and commissioner for assessment for Aldeburgh from 1673 to 1680. In 1675 he was commissioner for recusants for Suffolk and was assistant of the Royal African Company until 1677. He became Deputy Lieutenant of London in 1676 until 1683 and became freeman of the East India Company in 1678. In October 1679 he was elected again as MP for Aldeburgh. He was assistant of the Royal African Company from 1680 to 1682. In 1681 he was re-elected MP for Aldeburgh. He was re-elected MP for Aldeburgh in 1685. In 1685 he was again assistant of the Royal African Company until 1687 but in 1687 was removed from the court of assistants of the Grocers’ Company.

Bence died at the age of 65.

Bence married firstly by 1653, Judith Andrews, daughter of Peter Andrews, merchant of London and had a son, who predeceased him, and a daughter, Rachel, who married Vere Fane, 4th Earl of Westmorland. He married secondly by licence issued on 10 December 1661, Joan Wood, widow of John Wood, merchant of London, and daughter of Sampson Cotton, merchant, of London. His cousin and executor John Bence was MP for Dunwich and Ipswich.

Parliament of England
Preceded by Not represented in Second Protectorate Parliament	Member of Parliament for Aldeburgh; 1659; With: Laurence Oxburgh	Succeeded by Not represented in Restored Rump
