= List of MPs elected in the 1768 British general election =

1768–1774 Parliament of the Great Britain
←	1761–1786 Parliament	1774–1780 Parliament	→

Overview
- Legislative body: Parliament of Great Britain
- Jurisdiction: Great Britain
- Meeting place: Palace of Westminster
- Term: 6 October 1796 – 31 December 1800
- Election: 1768 British general election
- Government: Grafton ministry North ministry

House of Commons
- Members: 558
- Leader: Lord North
- Prime Minister: Lord North
- Leader of the Opposition: Charles James Fox

House of Lords
- Lord Chancellor: 1st Earl Camden (until 17 January 1770); Charles Yorke (17–20 January 1770); In commission (21 January 1770–23 January 1771); 2nd Earl Bathurst (from 23 January 1771)
- Leader: 3rd Duke of Grafton (until 28 January 1770); Viscount Weymouth (January–December 1770); 4th Earl of Rochford (from December 1770)

Crown-in-Parliament George III

Sessions
- 1st: 10 May 1768 – 21 June 1768
- 2nd: 8 November 1768 – 9 May 1769
- 3rd: 9 January 1770 – 19 May 1770
- 4th: 13 November 1770 – 8 May 1771
- 5th: 21 January 1772 – 9 June 1772
- 6th: 26 November 1772 – 1 July 1773
- 7th: 13 January 1774 – 22 June 1774

This is a list of the 558 MPs or members of Parliament elected to the 314 constituencies of the Parliament of Great Britain at the 1768 British general election, the 13th Parliament of Great Britain and their replacements returned at subsequent by-elections, arranged by constituency.

Table of contents:

A B C D E F G H I J K L M N O P Q R S T U V W X Y Z By-elections Changes

== A ==
Aberdeen Burghs (seat 1/1)	Thomas Lyon	Pro-Administration Whig
Aberdeenshire (seat 1/1)	Alexander Garden	Independent
Abingdon (seat 1/1)	John Morton	Tory, Replaced on petition by Nathaniel Bayly, 1770
Aldborough (seat 1/2)	Hon. Aubrey Beauclerk	
Aldborough (seat 2/2)	Andrew Wilkinson	Whig. Vacated seat and replaced by Henry Pelham-Clinton, Earl of Lincoln, 1772
Aldeburgh (seat 1/2)	Zachary Philip Fonnereau	
Aldeburgh (seat 2/2)	Nicholas Linwood	Died and replaced by Thomas Fonnereau
Amersham (seat1/2)	William Drake, Sr.	Tory
Amersham (seat 2/2)	William Drake, Jr.	Tory
Andover (seat 1/2)	Sir John Griffin	
Andover (seat 2/2)	Benjamin Lethieullier	
Anglesey (seat 1/1)	Owen Meyrick	Whig. Died and replaced by Sir Nicholas Bayly, 2nd Baronet, 1770
Anstruther Easter Burghs (seat 1/1)	Sir John Anstruther	
Appleby (seat 1/2)	Philip Honywood	
Appleby (seat 2/2)	Charles Jenkinson	Whig, Vacated seat and replaced by Fletcher Norton, 1773
Argyllshire (seat 1/1)	Robert Campbell	Appointed to Crown office and replaced by Adam Livingston, 1772
Arundel (seat 1/2)	Sir George Colebrooke, Bt.	
Arundel (seat 2/2)	Lauchlin Macleane	Vacated seat and replaced by John Stewart, 1771
Ashburton (seat 1/2)	Laurence Sulivan	
Ashburton (seat 2/2)	Charles Boone	
Aylesbury (seat 1/2)	Anthony Bacon	
Aylesbury (seat 2/2)	John Durand	
Ayr Burghs (seat 1/1)	James Archibald Stuart	
Ayrshire (seat 1/1)	David Kennedy	
== B ==
Banbury (seat 1/1)	Frederick North, Lord North	Tory
Banffshire (seat 1/1)	James Duff	
Barnstaple (seat 1/2)	John Clevland	Whig
Barnstaple (seat 2/2)	Denys Rolle	
Bath (seat 1/2)	Sir John Sebright, 6th Baronet	
Bath (seat 2/2)	John Smith	
Beaumaris (seat 1/1)	Sir Hugh Williams, 8th Baronet	
Bedford (seat 1/2)	Richard Vernon	Whig
Bedford (seat 2/2)	Samuel Whitbread	Tory
Bedfordshire (seat 1/2)	John FitzPatrick, 2nd Earl of Upper Ossory	Whig
Bedfordshire (seat 2/2)	Robert Ongley	Tory
Bere Alston (seat 1/2)	Sir Francis Drake, 5th Baronet	Appointed to Crown office and replaced by Francis William Drake,1771
Bere Alston (seat 2/2)	Hon. George Hobart	
Berkshire (seat 1/2)	Arthur Vansittart	Tory
Berkshire (seat 2/2)	Thomas Craven	Died and replaced by John Elwes, 1772
Berwickshire (seat 1/1)	Sir John Hussey Delaval	
Berwick-upon-Tweed (seat 1/2)	Robert Paris Taylor	
Berwick-upon-Tweed (seat 2/2)	Sir James Pringle, 4th Baronet	
Beverley (seat 1/2)	Hugh Bethell	
Beverley (seat 2/2)	Charles Anderson-Pelham	
Bewdley (seat 1/1)	Thomas Lyttelton	Evicted on petition and replaced by Sir Edward Winnington, 1st Baronet, 1769
Bishops Castle (seat 1/2)	George Clive	
Bishops Castle (seat 2/2)	William Clive	Vacated seat and replaced by Alexander Wedderburn, 1770
Bletchingley (seat 1/2)	Sir Kenrick Clayton, 2nd Baronet	Died and replaced by Frederick Standert
Bletchingley (seat 2/2)	Robert Clayton	
Bodmin (seat 1/2)	George Hunt	
Bodmin (seat 2/2)	James Laroche	
Boroughbridge (seat 1/2)	Nathaniel Cholmley	
Boroughbridge (seat 2/2)	James West	Died and replaced by Henry Clinton, 1772
Bossiney (seat 1/2)	John Stuart, Lord Mountstuart	
Bossiney (seat 2/2)	Henry Lawes Luttrell	Vacated seat and replaced by Sir George Osborn, 4th Baronet, 1769
Boston (seat 1/2)	Lord Robert Bertie	
Boston (seat 2/2)	Charles Amcotts	
Brackley (seat 1/2)	Robert Wood	Died and replaced by Timothy Caswall, 1771
Brackley (seat 2/2)	William Egerton	
Bramber (seat 1/2)	Edward Garth-Turnour, Baron Winterton	Replaced on petition by Thomas Thoroton, 1769
Bramber (seat 2/2)	Charles Lowndes	Replaced on petition by Charles Ambler, 1769
Brecon (seat 1/1)	Charles Morgan	Vacated seat and replaced by John Morgan, 1769. John Morgan also vacated seat and replaced by Charles Van, 1774.
Breconshire (seat 1/1)	Thomas Morgan	Died and replaced by Charles Morgan, 1769
Bridgnorth (seat 1/2)	The Lord Pigot	
Bridgnorth (seat 2/2)	William Whitmore	Died and replaced by Thomas Whitmore
Bridgwater (seat 1/2)	Benjamin Allen	
Bridgwater (seat 2/2)	John James Perceval, Viscount Perceval	Replaced on petition by Hon. Anne Poulett, 1769
Bridport (seat 1/2)	Thomas Coventry	
Bridport (seat 2/2)	Sambrooke Freeman	
Bristol (seat 1/2)	Robert Nugent, Vicount Clare	
Bristol (seat 2/2)	Matthew Brickdale	
Buckingham (seat 1/2)	George Grenville	Grenvillite. Died and replaced by James Grenville, 1770
Buckingham (seat 2/2)	Henry Grenville	Grenvillite
Buckinghamshire (seat 1/2)	Richard Lowndes	
Buckinghamshire (seat 2/2)	Ralph Verney, Earl Verney	
Bury St Edmunds (seat 1/2)	Hon. Charles Fitzroy	
Bury St Edmunds (seat 2/2)	Augustus John Hervey	
Buteshire (seat 0/0)	Alternating seat with Caithness. No representation in 1768	
== C ==
Caernarvon Boroughs (seat 1/1)	Glyn Wynn	
Caernarvonshire (seat 1/1)	Sir Thomas Wynn, 3rd Baronet	
Caithness (seat 1/1)	Viscount Fortrose	
Callington (seat 1/2)	Fane William Sharpe	Died and replaced by William Skrine
Callington (seat 2/2)	Thomas Worsley	
Calne (seat 1/2)	Hon. Thomas FitzMaurice	
Calne (seat 2/2)	John Dunning	
Cambridge (seat 1/2)	Charles Sloane Cadogan	
Cambridge (seat 2/2)	Soame Jenyns	
Cambridgeshire (seat 1/2)	John Manners, Marquess of Granby	Manners died and replaced by Sir Sampson Eardley, Bt, 1770
Cambridgeshire (seat 2/2)	Sir John Hynde Cotton, Bt	
Cambridge University (seat 1/2)	Charles Yorke	Rockingham Whig. Appointed to Crown office and replaced by William de Grey, 1770. Grey then also appointed to Crown office and replaced by Richard Croftes, 1771
Cambridge University (seat 2/2)	Thomas Townshend	Whig
Camelford (seat 1/2)	Charles Phillips	
Camelford (seat 2/2)	William Wilson	
Canterbury (seat 1/2)	William Lynch	
Canterbury (seat 2/2)	Richard Milles	
Cardiff Boroughs (seat 1/1)	Herbert Mackworth	
Cardigan Boroughs (seat 1/1)	Pryse Campbell	Whig. Died and replaced by Ralph Congreve, 1769
Cardiganshire (seat 1/1)	Viscount Lisburne	
Carlisle (seat 1/2)	Lord Edward Bentinck	
Carlisle (seat 2/2)	George Musgrave	
Carmarthen (seat 1/1)	Griffith Philipps	
Carmarthenshire (seat 1/1)	George Rice	
Castle Rising (seat 1/2)	Thomas Whately	Whig. Died and replaced by Heneage Finch, 1772
Castle Rising (seat 2/2)	Jenison Shafto	Died and replaced by Crisp Molineux, 1771
Cheshire (seat 1/2)	Samuel Egerton	
Cheshire (seat 2/2)	John Crewe	Whig
Chester (seat 1/2)	Thomas Grosvenor	
Chester (seat 2/2)	Richard Wilbraham-Bootle	
Chichester (seat 1/2)	William Keppel	
Chichester (seat 2/2)	Thomas Conolly	
Chippenham (seat 1/2)	Sir Edward Bayntun-Rolt	
Chippenham (seat 2/2)	Sir Thomas Fludyer	Died and replaced by Henry Dawkins, 1769
Chipping Wycombe (seat 1/2)	Robert Waller	
Chipping Wycombe (seat 2/2)	Isaac Barré	Whig
Christchurch (seat 1/2)	Hon. Thomas Robinson	Ennobled and replaced by James Harris, jnr
Christchurch (seat 2/2)	James Harris	Whig
Cirencester (seat 1/2)	Estcourt Creswell	
Cirencester (seat 2/2)	James Whitshed	
Clackmannanshire (seat 0/0)	Alternating seat with Kinross-shire. No representation in 1768	
Clitheroe (seat 1/2)	Nathaniel Lister	Vacated seat and replaced by Thomas Lister, 1773
Clitheroe (seat 2/2)	Assheton Curzon	
Cockermouth (seat 1/2)	Sir George Macartney	Vacated seat and replaced by Sir James Lowther, 1769
Cockermouth (seat 2/2)	Charles Jenkinson	Sat for Appleby and replaced by George Johnstone, RN
Colchester (seat 1/2)	Charles Gray	Tory
Colchester (seat 2/2)	Isaac Martin Rebow	Whig
Corfe Castle (seat 1/2)	John Bond	
Corfe Castle (seat 2/2)	John Jenkinson	
Cornwall (seat 1/2)	Sir John St Aubyn, 4th Baronet	Died and replaced by Humphrey Mackworth-Praed, 1772
Cornwall (seat 2/2)	Sir John Molesworth, Bt	
Coventry (seat 1/2)	Hon. Henry Seymour-Conway	
Coventry (seat 2/2)	Hon. Andrew Archer	Ennobled and replaced by Sir Richard Glyn, Bt, 1768. Glyn died and replaced by Walter Waring, 1773
Cricklade (seat 1/2)	George Damer	
Cricklade (seat 2/2)	Sir Robert Fletcher	
Cromartyshire (seat 1/1)	William Pulteney	
Cumberland (seat 1/2)	Henry Curwen	
Cumberland (seat 2/2)	James Lowther, 1st Earl of Lonsdale	Replaced on petition by Sir Henry Fletcher, Bt, 1768
== D ==
Dartmouth (seat 1/2)	Richard Howe, Viscount Howe	
Dartmouth (seat 2/2)	Richard Hopkins	
Denbigh Boroughs (seat 1/1)	Richard Myddelton	
Denbighshire (seat 1/1)	Sir Lynch Cotton, 4th Baronet	
Derby (seat 1/2)	Lord Frederick Cavendish	
Derby (seat 2/2)	William Fitzherbert	Died and replaced by Wenman Coke, 1772
Derbyshire (seat 1/2)	Lord George Cavendish	Whig
Derbyshire (seat 2/2)	Godfrey Bagnall Clarke	Tory
Devizes (seat 1/2)	Charles Garth	
Devizes (seat 2/2)	James Sutton	
Devon (seat 1/2)	Sir Richard Bampfylde, Bt	
Devon (seat 2/2)	John Parker	
Dorchester (seat 1/2)	John Damer	
Dorchester (seat 2/2)	Thomas Ewer	
Dorset (seat 1/2)	George Pitt	
Dorset (seat 2/2)	Humphrey Sturt	
Dover (seat 1/2)	Hon. Sir Joseph Yorke	
Dover (seat 2/2)	Viscount Villiers	Ennobled and replaced by Sir Thomas Hales, 4th Baronet, 1770. Hales died and was replaced by Thomas Barret, 1773.
Downton (seat 1/2)	Thomas Duncombe	
Downton (seat 2/2)	Richard Croftes	Vacated seat and replaced by James Hayes
Droitwich (seat 1/2)	Thomas Foley, later Lord Foley	Whig. Sat for Herefordshire and was replaced by Edward Foley, 1768. Edward Foley vacated seat and was replaced by Rowland Berkeley
Droitwich (seat 2/2)	Robert Harley	Tory. Died and replaced by Andrew Foley, 1774
Dumfries Burghs (seat 1/1)	William Douglas	
Dumfriesshire (seat 1/1)	Archibald Douglas	
Dunbartonshire (seat 1/1)	Sir Archibald Edmonstone, 1st Baronet	Tory
Dunwich (seat 1/2)	Gerard Vanneck	
Dunwich (seat 2/2)	Miles Barne	
Durham (City of) (seat 1/2)	William Henry Lambton	Whig
Durham (City of) (seat 2/2)	John Tempest	
Durham (County) (seat 1/2)	Hon. Frederick Vane	
Durham (County) (seat 2/2)	Sir Thomas Clavering, 7th Baronet	
Dysart Burghs (seat 1/1)	James Townsend Oswald	
== E ==
East Grinstead (seat 1/2)	Lord George Sackville	
East Grinstead (seat 2/2)	John Irwin	
East Looe (seat 1/2)	Richard Hussey	
East Looe (seat 2/2)	John Buller	
East Retford (seat 1/2)	Sir Cecil Wray, 13th Baronet	
East Retford (seat 2/2)	John Offley	
Edinburgh (seat 1/1)	Sir Lawrence Dundas	Pro-Administration Whig
Edinburghshire (seat 1/1)	Sir Alexander Gilmour	
Elgin Burghs (seat 1/1)	Andrew Mitchell	Died and replaced by Thomas Lockhart, 1771
Elginshire (seat 1/1)	Francis Grant	
Essex (seat 1/2)	John Luther	
Essex (seat 2/2)	Sir William Maynard, 4th Baronet	Died and replaced by John Conyers, 1772
Evesham (seat 1/2)	John Rushout	
Evesham (seat 2/2)	George Durant	
Exeter (seat 1/2)	John Rolle Walter	
Exeter (seat 2/2)	John Buller	
Eye (seat 1/2)	Joshua Allen, Viscount Allen	Vacated seat and replaced by Richard Burton Phillipson, 1770
Eye (seat 2/2)	Hon. William Cornwallis	Vacated seat and replaced by Marquis of Carmarthen, 1774
== F ==
Fife (seat 1/1)	John Scott	Died and replaced by James Townsend Oswald, 1776. Oswald appointed to Crown office and replaced by Robert Skene, 1779. Skene replaced on petition by John Henderson, 1780
Flint Boroughs (seat 1/1)	Sir John Glynne, Bt	
Flintshire (seat 1/1)	Sir Roger Mostyn, Bt	
Forfarshire (seat 1/1)	William Maule, Earl Panmure	
Fowey (seat 1/2)	Philip Rashleigh	
Fowey (seat 2/2)	James Modyford Heywood	
== G ==
Gatton (seat 1/2)	Hon. John Damer	
Gatton (seat 2/2)	Joseph Martin	
Glamorganshire (seat 1/1)	George Venables-Vernon	
Glasgow Burghs (seat 1/1)	Lord Frederick Campbell	
Gloucester (seat 1/2)	Charles Barrow	
Gloucester (seat 2/2)	George Augustus Selwyn	
Gloucestershire (seat 1/2)	Thomas Tracy	Died and replaced by Sir William Guise, Bt
Gloucestershire (seat 2/2)	Edward Southwell	
Grampound (seat 1/2)	Grey Cooper	
Grampound (seat 2/2)	Charles Wolfran Cornwall	
Grantham (seat 1/2)	Lord George Manners-Sutton	
Grantham (seat 2/2)	Sir John Cust, Bt	Died and replaced by Francis Cust, 1770
Great Bedwyn (seat 1/2)	Hon. James Brudenell	Vacated seat and replaced by William Northey, 1768. Northey died and was replaced by Benjamin Hopkins, 1771
Great Bedwyn (seat 2/2)	Hon. Robert Brudenell	Chose to sit for Marlborough and replaced by William Burke, 1768
Great Grimsby (seat 1/2)	Anthony St Leger	
Great Grimsby (seat 2/2)	Joseph Mellish	
Great Marlow (seat 1/2)	William Clayton	
Great Marlow (seat 2/2)	William Dickinson (1745-1806)	
Great Yarmouth (seat 1/2)	Charles Townshend	
Great Yarmouth (seat 2/2)	Hon. Richard Walpole	
Guildford (seat 1/2)	Sir Fletcher Norton	
Guildford (seat 2/2)	George Onslow	
== H ==
Haddington Burghs (seat 1/1)	Patrick Warrender	
Haddingtonshire (seat 1/1)	Sir George Suttie, Bt	Vacated seat and replaced 1777 by William Hamilton Nisbet
Hampshire (seat 1/2)	Robert Henley	Ennobled and replaced 1772 by Sir Henry St John, Bt
Hampshire (seat 2/2)	Sir Simeon Stuart, Bt	
Harwich (seat 1/2)	John Roberts	Died and replaced 1772 by Charles Jenkinson
Harwich (seat 2/2)	Edward Harvey	
Haslemere (seat 1/2)	Thomas More Molyneux	
Haslemere (seat 2/2)	William Burrell	Appointed to Crown office and replaced 1774 by Sir Merrick Burrell, Bt
Hastings (seat 1/2)	William Ashburnham	
Hastings (seat 2/2)	Samuel Martin	
Haverfordwest (seat 1/1)	William Edwardes	
Hedon (seat 1/2)	Sir Charles Saunders	
Hedon (seat 2/2)	Beilby Thompson	
Helston (seat 1/2)	William Evelyn	
Helston (seat 2/2)	Earl of Clanbrassil	
Hereford (seat 1/2)	John Scudamour	
Hereford (seat 2/2)	Richard Symons	
Herefordshire (seat 1/2)	Thomas Foley snr	
Herefordshire (seat 2/2)	Thomas Foley jnr	
Hertford (seat 1/2)	John Calvert	
Hertford (seat 2/2)	William Cowper	Died and replaced 1770 by Paul Fielde
Hertfordshire (seat 1/2)	William Plumer	
Hertfordshire (seat 2/2)	Thomas Halsey	
Heytesbury (seat 1/2)	Charles FitzRoy-Scudamore	
Heytesbury (seat 2/2)	William Ashe-à'Court	
Higham Ferrers (seat 1/1)	Frederick Montagu	
Hindon (seat 1/2)	John St Leger Douglas	
Hindon (seat 2/2)	William Hussey	
Honiton (seat 1/2)	Sir George Yonge, Bt	
Honiton (seat 2/2)	Brass Crosby	
Horsham (seat 1/2)	James Grenville	Vacated seat and replaced 1770 by James Wallace
Horsham (seat 2/2)	Robert Pratt	
Huntingdon (seat 1/2)	Henry Seymour	
Huntingdon (seat 2/2)	Robert Jones	Jones died and replaced 1774 by Hon. William Augustus Montagu
Huntingdonshire (seat 1/2)	Viscount Hinchingbrooke	
Huntingdonshire (seat 2/2)	The Earl Ludlow	
Hythe (seat 1/2)	John Sawbridge	
Hythe (seat 2/2)	William Evelyn	
== I ==
Ilchester (seat 1/2)	Peter Legh	
Ilchester (seat 2/2)	Sir Brownlow Cust	
Inverness Burghs (seat 1/1)	Sir Hector Munro	
Inverness-shire (seat 1/1)	Simon Fraser	
Ipswich (seat 1/2)	William Wollaston	
Ipswich (seat 2/2)	Thomas Staunton	
== K ==
Kent (seat 1/2)	Sir Brook Bridges, Bt	Whig
Kent (seat 2/2)	John Frederick Sackville	Ennobled and replaced 1769 by Sir Charles Farnaby
Kincardineshire (seat 1/1)	Robert Rickart Hepburn	
King's Lynn (seat 1/2)	Thomas Walpole	
King's Lynn (seat 2/2)	Sir John Turner, Bt	
Kingston upon Hull (seat 1/2)	William Weddell	
Kingston upon Hull (seat 2/2)	Lord Robert Manners	
Kinross-shire (seat 1/1)	Robert Adam	
Kirkcudbright Stewartry (seat 1/1)	James Murray	
Knaresborough (seat 1/2)	Robert Boyle-Walsingham	
Knaresborough (seat 2/2)	Sir Anthony Abdy, Bt	Rockingham Whig
== L ==
Lanarkshire (seat 1/1)	John Lockhart-Ross	
Lancashire (seat 1/2)	Lord Archibald Hamilton	Vacated seat and replaced 1772 by Sir Thomas Egerton
Lancashire (seat 2/2)	James Smith-Stanley, Lord Strange	Died and replaced 1771 by Viscount Molyneux
Lancaster (seat 1/2)	Sir George Warren	
Lancaster (seat 2/2)	Francis Reynolds	Died and replaced 1773 by Lord Richard Cavendish
Launceston (seat 1/2)	Humphry Morice	
Launceston (seat 2/2)	William Amherst	
Leicester (seat 1/2)	Hon. Booth Grey	
Leicester (seat 2/2)	Eyre Coote	
Leicestershire (seat 1/2)	Sir Thomas Cave, Bt	
Leicestershire (seat 2/2)	Sir John Palmer, Bt	
Leominster (seat 1/2)	John Bateman, Viscount Bateman	
Leominster (seat 2/2)	John Carnac	
Lewes (seat 1/2)	Thomas Hampden	
Lewes (seat 2/2)	Thomas Hay	
Lichfield (seat 1/2)	Thomas Anson	Vacated seat and replaced 1770 by George Adams (later Anson)
Lichfield (seat 2/2)	Thomas Gilbert	
Lincoln (seat 1/2)	Thomas Scrope	
Lincoln (seat 2/2)	Constantine Phipps	
Lincolnshire (seat 1/2)	Lord Brownlow Bertie	
Lincolnshire (seat 2/2)	Thomas Whichcot	
Linlithgow Burghs (seat 1/1)	John Lockhart-Ross	Sat for Lanarkshire and replaced 1768 by James Dickson. Dickson died and was replaced 1772 by Sir James Cockburn, Bt
Linlithgowshire (seat 1/1)	John Hope (writer)	Replaced on petition 1770 by James Dundas
Liskeard (seat 1/2)	Edward Eliot	
Liskeard (seat 2/2)	Samuel Salt	
Liverpool (seat 1/2)	Sir William Meredith, Bt	
Liverpool (seat 2/2)	Richard Pennant	
London (City of) (seat 1/4)	Hon. Thomas Harley	
London (City of) (seat 2/4)	Sir Robert Ladbroke	Died and replaced 1773 by Frederick Bull
London (City of) (seat 3/4)	William Beckford	Died and replaced 1770 by Richard Oliver
London (City of) (seat 4/4)	Barlow Trecothick	
Lostwithiel (seat 1/2)	Henry Cavendish	
Lostwithiel (seat 2/2)	Charles Brett	
Ludgershall (seat 1/2)	John Stewart, Lord Garlies	Ennobled and replaced 1774 by Whitshed Keene
Ludgershall (seat 2/2)	Peniston Lamb	
Ludlow (seat 1/2)	Edward Herbert	Died and replaced 1770 by Thomas Herbert
Ludlow (seat 2/2)	William Fellowes	
Lyme Regis (seat 1/2)	John Fane, Lord Berghersh	Ennobled and replaced in 1772 by Henry Fane
Lyme Regis (seat 2/2)	Henry Fane	
Lymington (seat 1/2)	Adam Drummond	Chose to sit for St Ives and replaced 1769 by Hugo Meynell
Lymington (seat 2/2)	Harry Burrard	
== M ==
Maidstone (seat 1/2)	Hon. Charles Marsham	
Maidstone (seat 2/2)	Robert Gregory	
Maldon (seat 1/2)	John Huske	Died and replaced 1773 by Charles Rainsford
Maldon (seat 2/2)	John Bullock	
Malmesbury (seat 1/2)	Arthur Chichester, Earl of Donegall	
Malmesbury (seat 2/2)	Thomas Howard, Earl of Suffolk	
Malton (seat 1/2)	John Dawnay, Viscount Downe	
Malton (seat 2/2)	Savile Finch	
Marlborough (seat 1/2)	Robert Brudenell	Died and replaced 1768 by Hon. James Brudenell
Marlborough (seat 2/2)	Sir James Long, Bt	
Merionethshire (seat 1/1)	John Pugh Pryse	
Middlesex (seat 1/2)	John Wilkes	Radical - for the controversy around his election see Middlesex election affair
Middlesex (seat 2/2)	George Cooke	Tory, Died and replaced 1768 by John Glynn
Midhurst (seat 1/2)	Lord Stavordale	
Midhurst (seat 2/2)	Charles James Fox	Whig
Milborne Port (seat 1/2)	Edward Walter	
Milborne Port (seat 2/2)	Thomas Hutchings-Medlycott	Vacated seat and replaced 1770 by Robert Knight, Earl of Catherlough. Catherlough died and replaced 1772 by Richard Combe. Combe replaced on petition 1772 by George Prescott
Minehead (seat 1/2)	Henry Fownes Luttrell	
Minehead (seat 2/2)	Charles Whitworth	
Mitchell (seat 1/2)	James Scawen	
Mitchell (seat 2/2)	John Stephenson	
Monmouth Boroughs (seat 1/1)	John Stepney	
Monmouthshire (seat 1/2)	Thomas Morgan	Died and replaced 1771 by John Morgan
Monmouthshire (seat 2/2)	John Hanbury	
Montgomery (seat 1/1)	Richard Clive	Died and replaced 1771 by Frederick Cornewall
Montgomeryshire (seat 1/1)	Edward Kynaston	Died and replaced 1772 by Watkin Williams
Morpeth (seat 1/2)	Peter Beckford	
Morpeth (seat 2/2)	Sir Matthew White Ridley, Bt	
== N ==
Nairnshire (seat 0/0)	Alternating seat with Cromartyshire. No representation in 1768	
Newark (seat 1/2)	John Manners	
Newark (seat 2/2)	John Shelley	
Newcastle-under-Lyme (seat 1/2)	John Wrottesley	Vacated seat and replaced 1768 by George Hay
Newcastle-under-Lyme (seat 2/2)	Alexander Forrester	
Newcastle-upon-Tyne (seat 1/2)	Sir Walter Calverley Blackett	
Newcastle-upon-Tyne (seat 2/2)	Matthew Ridley	
Newport (Cornwall) (seat 1/2)	William de Grey	Vacated seat and replaced 1770 by Richard Henry Alexander Bennet
Newport (Cornwall) (seat 2/2)	Richard Bull	
Newport (Isle of Wight) (seat 1/2)	John Eames	Appointed to Crown office and replaced by Hon. John St John
Newport (Isle of Wight) (seat 2/2)	Hans Sloane	
New Radnor Boroughs (seat 1/1)	John Lewis	Replaced on petition 1769 by Edward Lewis
New Romney (seat 1/2)	Sir Edward Dering, Bt	Vacated seat and replaced 1760 by John Morton
New Romney (seat 2/2)	Richard Jackson	
New Shoreham (seat 1/2)	Sir Samuel Cornish, Bt	Died and replaced 1770 by John Purling. Purling replaced on petition 1770 by Thomas Rumbold
New Shoreham (seat 2/2)	Peregrine Cust	
Newton (Lancashire) (seat 1/2)	Peter Legh	
Newton (Lancashire) (seat 2/2)	Anthony James Keck	
Newtown (Isle of Wight) (seat 1/2)	Sir John Barrington, Bt	
Newtown (Isle of Wight) (seat 2/2)	Harcourt Powell	
New Windsor (seat 1/2)	Augustus Keppel	
New Windsor (seat 2/2)	Lord George Beauclerk	Died and replaced 1768 by Richard Tonson. Tonson died and replaced 1772 by John Montagu
New Woodstock (seat 1/2)	Lord Robert Spencer	Vacated seat and replaced 1771 by John Skynner
New Woodstock (seat 2/2)	William Gordon	
Norfolk (seat 1/2)	Sir Edward Astley, Bt	
Norfolk (seat 2/2)	Thomas de Grey	
Northallerton (seat 1/2)	Daniel Lascelles	
Northallerton (seat 2/2)	Edward Lascelles	
Northampton (seat 1/2)	George Brydges Rodney	
Northampton (seat 2/2)	Sir George Osborn	Osborn replaced on petition 1769 by Hon. Thomas Howe. Howe died and replaced 1771 by Wilbraham Tollemache
Northamptonshire (seat 1/2)	Sir Edmund Isham, Bt	
Northamptonshire (seat 2/2)	Sir William Dolben, Bt	
Northumberland (seat 1/2)	George Shafto Delaval	
Northumberland (seat 2/2)	Sir Edward Blackett, Bt	
Norwich (seat 1/2)	Harbord Harbord	
Norwich (seat 2/2)	Edward Bacon	
Nottingham (seat 1/2)	John Plumptre	
Nottingham (seat 2/2)	Colonel the Hon. (Sir) William Howe	
Nottinghamshire (seat 1/2)	Thomas Willoughby	
Nottinghamshire (seat 2/2)	John Hewett	
== O ==
Okehampton (seat 1/2)	Thomas Pitt	
Okehampton (seat 2/2)	Thomas Brand	Died and replaced 1770 by Hon. Richard FitzPatrick
Old Sarum (seat 1/2)	William Gerard Hamilton	
Old Sarum (seat 2/2)	John Craufurd	
Orford (seat 1/2)	Viscount Beauchamp	
Orford (seat 2/2)	Edward Colman	Appointed to Crown office and replaced 1771 by Hon. Robert Seymour-Conway
Orkney and Shetland (seat 1/1)	Thomas Dundas	Pro-Administration Whig
Oxford (seat 1/2)	George Nares	Nares appointed to Crown office and replaced 1771 by Lord Robert Spencer
Oxford (seat 2/2)	William Harcourt	
Oxfordshire (seat 1/2)	Lord Charles Spencer	Whig
Oxfordshire (seat 2/2)	Viscount Wenman	
Oxford University (seat 1/2)	Sir Roger Newdigate, Bt	
Oxford University (seat 2/2)	Francis Page	
== P ==
Peeblesshire (seat 1/1)	James William Montgomery	
Pembroke Boroughs (seat 1/1)	William Owen	
Pembrokeshire (seat 1/1)	Sir Richard Philipps, Bt	Election declared void. Replaced 1770 by Hugh Owen
Penryn (seat 1/2)	Francis Basset	Died and replaced 1770 by William Lemon
Penryn (seat 2/2)	Hugh Pigot	
Perth Burghs (seat 1/1)	William Pulteney	Whig. Sat for Cromartyshire and replaced 1769 by George Dempster
Perthshire (seat 1/1)	David Graeme	Vacated seat and replaced 1773 by James Murray
Peterborough (seat 1/2)	Sir Matthew Lamb, Bt	Died and replaced 1768 by Henry Belasyse, Viscount Belasyse. Belasyse ennobled and replaced 1774 by Richard Benyon
Peterborough (seat 2/2)	Matthew Wyldbore	Whig
Petersfield (seat 1/2)	William Jolliffe	
Petersfield (seat 2/2)	Welbore Ellis	
Plymouth (seat 1/2)	The Viscount Barrington	
Plymouth (seat 2/2)	Francis Holburne	Died and replaced 1771 by Sir Charles Hardy
Plympton Erle (seat 1/2)	Paul Henry Ourry	
Plympton Erle (seat 2/2)	William Baker	
Pontefract (seat 1/2)	Viscount Galway	Election declared void but Galway re-elected, 1768. Died and replaced 1772 by 3rd Viscount Galway
Pontefract (seat 2/2)	Sir Rowland Winn, Bt	Election declared void and Winn replaced by Sir Henry Strachey, Bt, 1768
Poole (seat 1/2)	Thomas Calcraft	
Poole (seat 2/2)	Joshua Mauger	Election declared void but Mauger re-elected, 1768
Portsmouth (seat 1/2)	Sir Edward Hawke	
Portsmouth (seat 2/2)	Matthew Fetherstonhaugh	Died and replaced 1774 by Peter Taylor
Preston (seat 1/2)	Sir Peter Byrne Leicester	Replaced on petition 1768 by Colonel John Burgoyne
Preston (seat 2/2)	Sir Frank Standish, Bt	Replaced on petition 1768 by Sir Harry Hoghton, Bt
== Q ==
Queenborough (seat 1/2)	Sir Charles Frederick	
Queenborough (seat 2/2)	Sir Peircy Brett	
== R ==
Radnorshire (seat 1/1)	Chase Price	
Reading (seat 1/2)	Henry Vansittart	
Reading (seat 2/2)	John Dodd	
Reigate (seat 1/2)	John Yorke	
Reigate (seat 2/2)	Charles Cocks	
Renfrewshire (seat 1/1)	William Macdowall	
Richmond (Yorkshire) (seat 1/2)	Sir Lawrence Dundas, Bt	Sat for Edinburgh and replaced 1768 by William Norton
Richmond (Yorkshire) (seat 2/2)	Alexander Wedderburn	Vacated seat and replaced 1769 by Charles John Crowle
Ripon (seat 1/2)	William Aislabie	
Ripon (seat 2/2)	Charles Allanson	
Rochester (seat 1/2)	John Calcraft	Died and replaced 1772 by George Finch-Hatton
Rochester (seat 2/2)	William Gordon	Vacated seat and replaced 1771 by Thomas Pye
Ross-shire (seat 1/1)	James Stuart-Mackenzie	
Roxburghshire (seat 1/1)	Sir Gilbert Elliot, Bt	
Rutland (seat 1/2)	Thomas Noel	
Rutland (seat 2/2)	George Bridges Brudenell	
Rye (seat 1/2)	John Norris	
Rye (seat 2/2)	Rose Fuller	
== S ==
St Albans (seat 1/2)	Richard Sutton	
St Albans (seat 2/2)	John Radcliffe	
St Germans (seat 1/2)	Edward Eliot	Whig. Sat for Liskeard and replaced 1768 by Benjamin Langlois.
St Germans (seat 2/2)	Samuel Salt	Sat for Liskeard and replaced 1768 by George Jennings
St Ives (seat 1/2)	Thomas Durrant	
St Ives (seat 2/2)	Adam Drummond	
St Mawes (seat 1/2)	Edmund Nugent	Vacated seat and replaced 1770 by Michael Byrne. Byrne died and was replaced 1772 by James Edward Colleton
St Mawes (seat 2/2)	George Boscawen	
Salisbury (seat 1/2)	Edward Bouverie	Vacated seat and replaced 1771 by Viscount Folkestone
Salisbury (seat 2/2)	Hon. Stephen Fox	
Saltash (seat 1/2)	Martin Bladen hawke	
Saltash (seat 2/2)	Thomas Bradshaw	Appointed to Crown office and replaced May 1772 by John Williams. Williams replaced on petition June 1772 by Thomas Bradshaw.
Sandwich (seat 1/2)	Viscount Conyngham	
Sandwich (seat 2/2)	Philip Stephens	
Scarborough (seat 1/2)	George Manners	Died and replaced 1772 by George Carpenter, 2nd Earl of Tyrconnell
Scarborough (seat 2/2)	Fountayne Wentworth Osbaldeston	Died and replaced 1770 by Sir James Pennyman, Bt.
Seaford (seat 1/2)	William Gage, Viscount Gage	
Seaford (seat 2/2)	George Medley	
Selkirkshire (seat 1/1)	John Pringle	
Shaftesbury (seat 1/2)	William Chaffin Grove	
Shaftesbury (seat 2/2)	Ralph Payne	Appointed to Crown office and replaced 1771 by Francis Sykes
Shrewsbury (seat 1/2)	Noel Hill	
Shrewsbury (seat 2/2)	Robert Clive, Baron Clive	Tory
Shropshire (seat 1/2)	Sir John Astley, Bt	Died and replaced 1772 by Sir Watkin Williams-Wynn, Bt
Shropshire (seat 2/2)	Charles Baldwyn	
Somerset (seat 1/2)	Sir Charles Tynte, Bt	
Somerset (seat 2/2)	Richard Hippisley Coxe	
Southampton (seat 1/2)	Hans Stanley	
Southampton (seat 2/2)	Henry Temple, Viscount Palmerston	
Southwark (seat 1/2)	Henry Thrale	
Southwark (seat 2/2)	Sir Joseph Mawbey, Bt	
Stafford (seat 1/2)	Richard Whitworth	
Stafford (seat 2/2)	Hon. William Chetwynd, Viscount Chetwynd	Died and replaced 1770 by William Neville Hart
Staffordshire (seat 1/2)	George Grey, Lord Grey	Ennobled and replaced 1768 by Sir John Wrottesley, Bt
Staffordshire (seat 2/2)	William Bagot	
Stamford (seat 1/2)	George Howard	
Stamford (seat 2/2)	George René Aufrère	
Steyning (seat 1/2)	Sir John Filmer	
Steyning (seat 2/2)	Thomas Edwards-Freeman	
Stirling Burghs (seat 1/1)	James Masterton	Pro-Administration Whig
Stirlingshire (seat 1/1)	Sir Thomas Dundas	Pro-Administration Whig
Stockbridge (seat 1/2)	Richard Alchorne Worge	Vacated seat and replaced 1772 by James Hare
Stockbridge (seat 2/2)	Richard Fuller	
Sudbury (seat 1/2)	Sir Patrick Blake, Bt	
Sudbury (seat 2/2)	Walden Hanmer	
Suffolk (seat 1/2)	Sir John Rous, Bt	Died and replaced 1771 by Rowland Holt
Suffolk (seat 2/2)	Sir Charles Bunbury, Bt	
Surrey (seat 1/2)	George Onslow	
Surrey (seat 2/2)	Sir Francis Vincent, Bt	
Sussex (seat 1/2)	Lord George Lennox	
Sussex (seat 2/2)	Thomas Pelham	Ennobled and replaced 1768 by Richard Harcourt
Sutherland (seat 1/1)	James Wemyss	
== T ==
Tain Burghs (seat 1/1)	Alexander Mackay	Vacated seat and replaced 1773 by James Grant
Tamworth (seat 1/2)	William de Grey	Sat for Newport and replaced 1768 by Charles Vernon
Tamworth (seat 2/2)	Edward Thurlow	
Taunton (seat 1/2)	Alexander Popham	
Taunton (seat 2/2)	Nathaniel Webb	
Tavistock (seat 1/2)	Richard Rigby	Whig
Tavistock (seat 2/2)	Richard Neville Aldworth Neville	
Tewkesbury (seat 1/2)	Sir William Codrington, Bt	Tory
Tewkesbury (seat 2/2)	Nicolson Calvert	
Thetford (seat 1/2)	Henry Seymour Conway	Rockingham Whig
Thetford (seat 2/2)	John Drummond	Died and replaced 1774 by Viscount Petersham
Thirsk (seat 1/2)	Sir Thomas Frankland, Bt	
Thirsk (seat 2/2)	William Frankland	
Tiverton (seat 1/2)	Nathaniel Ryder	
Tiverton (seat 2/2)	John Duntze	
Totnes (seat 1/2)	Philip Jennings	
Totnes (seat 2/2)	Peter Burrell	
Tregony (seat 1/2)	Thomas Pownall	
Tregony (seat 2/2)	Hon. John Grey	
Truro (seat 1/2)	George Bocawen	
Truro (seat 2/2)	Edward Hugh Boscawen	
== W ==
Wallingford (seat 1/2)	John Aubrey	
Wallingford (seat 2/2)	Robert Pigot	Appointed to Crown office and replaced 1772 by John Cator
Wareham (seat 1/2)	Ralph Burton	Died and replaced 1768 by Whitshed Keene
Wareham (seat 2/2)	Robert Palk	
Warwick (seat 1/2)	George Greville, Lord Greville	
Warwick (seat 2/2)	Henry Archer	Died and replaced 1768 by Paul Methuen
Warwickshire (seat 1/2)	Sir Charles Mordaunt, Bt	
Warwickshire (seat 2/2)	William Throckmorton Bromley	
Wells (seat 1/2)	Clement Tudway	
Wells (seat 2/2)	Robert Child	
Wendover (seat 1/2)	Edmund Burke	Whig
Wendover (seat 2/2)	Sir Robert Darling	Died and replaced 1770 by Joseph Bullock
Wenlock (seat 1/2)	Henry Bridgeman	
Wenlock (seat 2/2)	George Forester	
Weobley (seat 1/2)	Simon Luttrell	
Weobley (seat 2/2)	Hon. Henry Thynne – took office Replaced by Bamber Gascoyne	
Westbury (seat 1/2)	Peregrine Bertie	
Westbury (seat 2/2)	William Blackstone	Appointed to Crown office and replaced 1770 by Hon. Charles Dillon
West Looe (seat 1/2)	James Townsend	Whig
West Looe (seat 2/2)	William Graves	
Westminster (seat 1/2)	Edwin Sandys	Ennobled and replaced by Sir Robert Bernard, Bt
Westminster (seat 2/2)	Hugh Percy, Earl Percy	
Westmorland (seat 1/2)	John Robinson	
Westmorland (seat 2/2)	Thomas Fenwick	
Weymouth and Melcombe Regis (seat 1/4)	Drigue Olmius, Baron Waltham	
Weymouth and Melcombe Regis (seat 2/4)	Sir Charles Davers, Bt	
Weymouth and Melcombe Regis (seat 3/4)	Jeremiah Dyson	
Weymouth and Melcombe Regis (seat 4/4)	John Tucker	
Whitchurch (seat 1/2)	Thomas Townshend	Whig
Whitchurch (seat 2/2)	Hon. Henry Wallop	
Wigan (seat 1/2)	George Byng	
Wigan (seat 2/2)	Beaumont Hotham	
Wigtown Burghs (seat 1/1)	George Augustus Selwyn	Sat for Gloucester and replaced 1768 by Chauncy Townsend. Townsend died and was replaced by William Stewart
Wigtownshire (seat 1/1)	Keith Stewart	
Wilton (seat 1/2)	Hon. Nicholas Herbert	
Wilton (seat 2/2)	Henry Herbert	
Wiltshire (seat 1/2)	Edward Popham	
Wiltshire (seat 2/2)	Thomas Goddard	Died and replaced 1770 by Charles Penruddocke
Winchelsea (seat 1/2)	Thomas Orby Hunter	Died and replaced 1770 by Arnold Nesbitt
Winchelsea (seat 2/2)	Percy Wyndham-O'Brien, Earl of Thomond	Died and replaced 1774 by William Nedham
Winchester (seat 1/2)	Henry Penton	
Winchester (seat 2/2)	George Paulet	
Wootton Bassett (seat 1/2)	Thomas Estcourt Cresswell	
Wootton Bassett (seat 2/2)	Hon. Henry St John	
Worcester (seat 1/2)	Henry Crabb-Boulton	Died and replaced 1773 by Thomas Bates Rous. By-election declared void, 1774 and Rous replaced 1774 by Nicholas Lechmere
Worcester (seat 2/2)	John Walsh	
Worcestershire (seat 1/2)	John Ward	Ennobled and replaced 1774 by Edward Foley
Worcestershire (seat 2/2)	William Dowdeswell	
== Y ==
Yarmouth (Isle of Wight) (seat 1/2)	William Strode	Replaced on petition 1769 by Thomas Dummer
Yarmouth (Isle of Wight) (seat 2/2)	Jervoise Clarke	Replaced on petition 1769 by George Lane Parker
York (seat 1/2)	Lord John Cavendish	
York (seat 2/2)	Charles Turner	
Yorkshire (seat 1/2)	Sir George Savile	
Yorkshire (seat 2/2)	Edwin Lascelles	

== By-elections ==
- List of Great Britain by-elections (1754–74)

== See also ==
- 1768 British general election
- List of parliaments of Great Britain
- Unreformed House of Commons
