= Thomas Potter (died 1759) =

British politician

Thomas Potter (1718–1759) was a British politician who sat in the House of Commons between 1747 and 1759.

Potter was born in 1718, the second son of John Potter, Archbishop of Canterbury. He matriculated, aged 13, at Christ Church, Oxford in 1731, graduating B.A. in 1735, and was admitted to the Middle Temple. Through his father's interest, he was able to secure the Recordership of Bath, a lucrative office.

Potter married firstly Anne Manningham, daughter of Rev. Thomas Manningham, rector of Slinfold, Sussex on 17 February 1740. Anne died on 4 January 1744 and he married secondly a Miss Lowe of Brightwell, Oxfordshire on 14 July 1747. From his second marriage he acquired Segenhoe Manor at Ridgmont, near Woburn, Bedfordshire.

Potter was a recognised member of the Hellfire Club, in Buckinghamshire, founded by Francis Dashwood, 11th Baron le Despencer and acquired a reputation as a leading rake. Potter was a friend of John Wilkes, whom he considered as something of a protégé. He was later accused of corrupting Wilkes who had been relatively innocent until that point. He was believed to be the author of Essay on Woman, a crude parody of Alexander Pope's Essay on Man. The authorship of this was later attributed to John Wilkes, when it was read out in the House of Lords, during his expulsion from parliament in 1764.

In 1747 Potter was elected as Member of Parliament for St Germans in Cornwall. While in this position he introduced the first bill into Parliament proposing a national population census. Despite significant opposition, the bill passed through all stages of the Commons. However, the bill lapsed due to the session ending.

In 1754 Potter was elected as MP for Aylesbury, a seat controlled by the powerful Grenville family with whom he was associated from then on. In 1756 he became a Vice-Treasurer of Ireland, another lucrative post, which did not require him to move to Ireland. He was returned as MP for Okehampton in 1757. Politically he was aligned with William Pitt and was his devoted follower. He was a staunch supporter of Britain's participation in the Seven Years War. He tried to interest his son Thomas in finding a seat in Parliament.

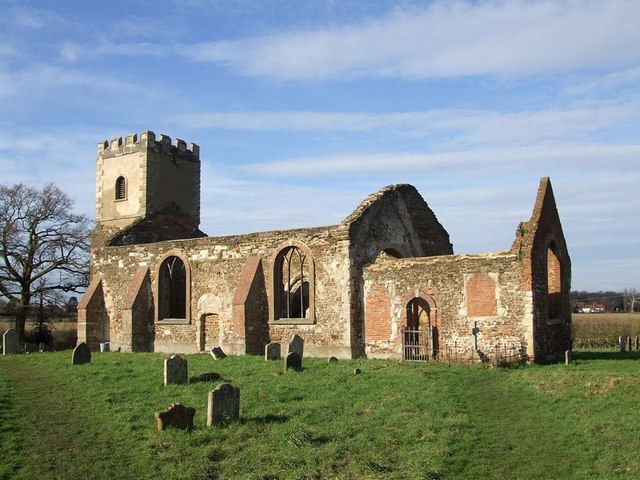
All Saints, Segenhoe

Potter was in ill health for a long time, suffering in particular from gout. In 1759 he died at his residence in Segenhoe at the age of forty one and was buried in nearby Segenhoe churchyard. He left a son and two daughters, one of which married Malcolm MacQueen, to whom Potter's estates passed.

== Bibliography ==
- Brown, Peter Douglas. William Pitt, Earl of Chatham: The Great Commoner. George Allen & Unwin, 1978.
- Cash, Arthur H. John Wilkes: The Scandalous Father of Civil Liberty. Yale University Press, 2006.

Parliament of Great Britain
Preceded by John Hynde Cotton; James Newsham	Member of Parliament for St Germans; 1747–1754; With: Richard Eliot 1747–48; Edward Craggs-Eliot 1748–54	Succeeded by Edward Craggs-Eliot; Anthony Champion
Preceded by The Earl of Inchiquin; Edward Willes	Member of Parliament for Aylesbury; 1754–1757; With: John Willes	Succeeded by John Willes; John Wilkes
Preceded by Robert Vyner; William Pitt	Member of Parliament for Okehampton; 1757–1759; With: Robert Vyner	Succeeded by Robert Vyner; George Brydges Rodney
