= John Newsham =

English politician (1673–1724)

John Newsham of Chadshunt, Warwickshire (15 April 1673 – 21 November 1724) was an English politician. He sat as MP for Lostwithiel from 25 June 1720 till 1722.

== Family and education ==
He was the first surviving son of Charles Newsham (died 1705) of Chadshunt by Elizabeth, the daughter and heiress of John Hide of East Greenwich, Kent. He was educated at New College, Oxford and matriculated in 1690; he entered the Middle Temple in 1693. He married his first wife, Anna Maria (died January 1705), the daughter of a London merchant, William Bridges. They had no children. In July 1712, he married his second wife, Anne, the daughter and co-heiress of senior postmaster general James Craggs and the sister and co-heiress of James Craggs and they had one son, James. Afterwards, Anne married John Knight of Gosfield Hall, Essex and Robert Nugent, 1st Earl Nugent.
