= Edward Craggs-Eliot, 1st Baron Eliot =

English official and politician

The Right Honourable The Lord Eliot
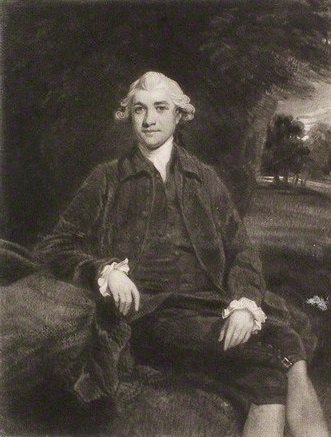

Personal details
- Born: 8 July 1727
- Died: 17 February 1804 (aged 76) Port Eliot, Cornwall
- Resting place: St Germans, Cornwall
- Spouse: Catherine Elliston (m. 1756)
- Children: 4, including Edward, John, and William

Edward Craggs-Eliot, 1st Baron Eliot (London, 8 July 1727 – 17 February 1804, Port Eliot, Cornwall) was an English official and politician who sat in the House of Commons from 1748 to 1784, when he was raised to the peerage as Baron Eliot.

== Life and career ==
He was born to Richard Eliot (c.1694 – 19 November 1748) and Harriot Craggs (c.1704 – January 1769), the illegitimate daughter of the Privy Counsellor and Secretary of State, James Craggs (9 April 1686 – 2 March 1721) and the noted actress, Hester Santlow. His sister Anne, who married Captain Hugh Bonfoy, was a noted beauty who was painted twice by Sir Joshua Reynolds. Another sister, Elizabeth, married Charles Cocks, 1st Baron Somers.

In 1742, he matriculated at St Mary Hall, Oxford but did not graduate. During 1747–1748, he travelled in Continental Europe, principally the Dutch Republic, Germany and Switzerland. On 19 November 1748, he succeeded his father. From 1748 to 1768 he was Member of Parliament for St Germans, Cornwall, the place of his family estate Port Eliot. In succession, he became Member of Parliament (MP) for Liskeard (1768–1774), for St Germans (1774–1775), and for Cornwall (1775–1784).

In 1751, Edward was appointed Receiver General of the Duchy of Cornwall. From 1760 until 1776, Edward was one of the eight Commissioners of Trade and Plantations, and in 1775 he again became Receiver General of the Duchy. However, in 1776 he notably voted against the employment of Hessian Troops, and resigned from the Board of Trade and Plantations, and from the government.

On 13 January 1784, he was raised to the peerage as Baron Eliot, of St Germans in the County of Cornwall, and took his seat in the House of Lords on 2 February 1784. On 15 Apr 1789, according to the stipulation in his Craggs-estate inheritance, he changed his surname from Eliot to Craggs (on occasion using "Craggs Eliot" instead of Edward Craggs Lord Eliot). At the same time, the Eliot arms were quartered with those of the Craggs family and used by Edward and his sons.

Eliot was an acquaintance of Dr Samuel Johnson and a friend and patron of Sir Joshua Reynolds.

== Family ==
Port Eliot in St Germans, the Eliot family seat

On 25 September 1756, he married Catherine Elliston (September 1735 – 23 February 1804), daughter of Captain Edward Elliston and Catherine Gibbon, the aunt of Edward Gibbon, at St James' Church, Westminster.

Together, they had four children:

1. Edward James Eliot (9 August 1757 – September 1757)
2. Edward James Eliot (24 August 1758 – 17 September 1797)
3. John Eliot, 1st Earl of St Germans (30 September 1761 – 17 November 1823)
4. William Eliot, 2nd Earl of St Germans (1 April 1767 – 19 January 1845)

Eliot died at his Port Eliot estate on 17 February 1804, and he was buried at St Germans, Cornwall.

Parliament of Great Britain
Preceded by Richard Eliot; Thomas Potter	Member of Parliament for St Germans; 1748–1768; With: Thomas Potter 1748–1754, Anthony Champion 1754–1761, Philip Stanhope 1761–1765, William Hussey 1765–1768, Samuel Salt 1768	Succeeded by George Jennings; Benjamin Langlois
Preceded by Philip Stephens; Anthony Champion	Member of Parliament for Liskeard; 1768–1774; With: Samuel Salt	Succeeded by Samuel Salt; Edward Gibbon
Preceded by George Jennings; Benjamin Langlois	Member of Parliament for St Germans; 1774–1775; With: Benjamin Langlois	Succeeded by Benjamin Langlois; John Pownall
Preceded by Sir John Molesworth, Bt; Sir William Lemon, Bt	Member of Parliament for Cornwall; 1775–1784; With: Sir William Lemon, Bt	Succeeded by Sir William Lemon, Bt; Sir William Molesworth, Bt
Peerage of Great Britain
New creation	Baron Eliot; 1784–1804	Succeeded by John Eliot
