= Richard Eliot =

British diplomat, official and politician

Portrait of Eliot by Michael Dahl

Richard Eliot (1694–1748), of St. Giles-in-the-Fields, Middlesex, was a British diplomat, official and politician who sat in the House of Commons from 1733 to 1748.

== Early life ==
Eliot was baptized on 28 October 1694, the second son of William Eliot, and a great-grandson of Sir John Eliot (1592-1632). His elder brother was Edward Eliot (1684–1722), father of James Eliot, whom Richard succeeded in 1742.

He matriculated at Balliol College, Oxford in 1712.

== Career ==
He was appointed secretary of the Embassy to Lord Carteret in Sweden in 1719, receiving £200 p.a. with no extraordinaries as he was to live with the ambassador. After the death of his brother Edward Eliot (1684–1722) in 1722, he managed the estates and parliamentary interest of his young nephew James Eliot at Port Eliot, whom he succeeded in 1742. In 1722, he was appointed Commissioner of excise. After he ceased to be Commissioner of Excise in May 1729, he was appointed surveyor general of the Duchy of Cornwall in January 1730.

Eliot was returned as Member of Parliament for St Germans at a by-election on 29 January 1733. He voted with the Administration on the Excise Bill in 1733 and the repeal of the Septennial Act in 1734. At the 1734 British general election he was returned as MP for Liskeard. In 1738 he went into opposition with the Prince of Wales and his post was exchanged for that of Receiver General of the Duchy. He voted against the Spanish convention in 1739, and for the place bill in 1740. He withdrew on the motion to dismiss Walpole in February 1741. At the 1741, he was returned again for Liskeard. He continued to act with the Prince of Wales's party, voting against the Administration on the chairman of the elections committee in December 1741. He was mayor of Liskeard for the year 1741 to 1742. After the fall of Walpole in 1742 he went over to the Administration. After losing out to John Carew in 1743, he was Mayor of Liskeard again for 1746 to 1747. In 1747, he reverted to opposition with the Prince again. At the 1747 British general election, he was returned again for St Germans.

== Personal life ==
On 10 March 1726, he married Harriot, who was the illegitimate daughter of James Craggs and the actress Hester Santlow.

Eliot died on 19 November 1748 leaving three sons and six daughters including Edward Craggs-Eliot, 1st Baron Eliot. He was in financial difficulties which were caused according to his wife by his Duchy office, which had cost him ‘£7,000 and contributed to his death. Harriot married secondly in 1749 John Hamilton, by whom she had a son, John Hamilton, 1st Marquess of Abercorn.

Parliament of Great Britain
Preceded by Sir Gilbert Heathcote; Sidney Godolphin	Member of Parliament for St Germans; 1733–1734; With: Sir Gilbert Heathcote; Dudley Ryder	Succeeded by The Lord Baltimore; Charles Montagu
Preceded by Thomas Clutterbuck; Sir John Cope	Member of Parliament for Liskeard; 1734–1747; With: George Dennis; Charles Trelawny 1740	Succeeded by Sir George Lee; Charles Trelawny
Preceded by John Hynde Cotton; James Newsham	Member of Parliament for St Germans; 1747 – 1748; With: Thomas Potter	Succeeded by Edward Eliot; Thomas Potter
