= Pownall =

Pownall may refer to:

== People ==
- Alan Pownall (b. 1986), British singer-songwriter
- Capel Pownall (1869-1933), British Olympic archer
- Charles Alan Pownall (1887-1975), US Navy rear admiral and 3rd Military Governor of Guam
- David Pownall (b. 1938), British playwright and author
- George Pownall (1755-1834), English politician in Lower Canada
- Henry Royds Pownall (1887-1961), British World War II general
- Leon Pownall (1943-2006), Welsh-born Canadian actor and director
- Michael Graham Pownall (b. 1949), British public servant and former Clerk of the Parliaments
- Nathalie Pownall (b. ? ), British actress
- Thomas Pownall (1722-1805), British statesman and soldier
- Thomas Pownall Boultbee (1818-1884), English clergyman and scholar

== Other uses ==
- Fort Pownall, Maine, United States
- Pownall Hall, a former country house in Wilmslow, England

== See also ==
- Pownal (disambiguation)
- Pwnall, to pwn all that one surveys
