= Philip Stanhope (diplomat) =

English politician & diplomat (1732-1768)

- Born: 2 May 1732
- Died: 16 November 1768 (aged 36); St Gervais, France
- Occupation: Diplomat
- Spouse: Eugenia Peters (m. 1767)
- Children: Charles and Philip
- Parent: Philip Stanhope, 4th Earl of Chesterfield

Philip Stanhope (2 May 1732 – 16 November 1768) was the illegitimate son of Philip Stanhope, 4th Earl of Chesterfield, to whom the famous Letters to His Son were addressed. His mother was a French governess, Madelina Elizabeth du Bouchet.

== Career ==
Despite his father taking great pains to educate him and using his influence to obtain various diplomatic appointments for what he hoped would be a high-flying career, Stanhope was treated with disdain by many because of his illegitimacy. He was a Member of Parliament for Liskeard and St Germans. The government in 1764 wished to get possession of his seat, asked him to vacate it, and after some negotiation agreed on receiving a payment of £1,000, which was half the amount that he (or his father) had paid for it. He was also successively Resident at Hamburg (1752–59) and Envoy Extraordinary to the Diet of Ratisbon, (1763) and on 3 April 1764, he was finally appointed to the Court of Dresden, Saxony.

== Family ==
Stanhope had met his wife, Eugenia Peters, in Rome in the spring of 1750 while on the Grand Tour. He was just 18, and she 20. Believed incorrectly by many to be the illegitimate daughter of an Irish gentleman by the name of Domville, Eugenia was described by one observer as "plain almost to ugliness" but possessing "the most careful education and all the choicest accomplishments of her sex". Her mother was noted, however, to have been "a true English goody, vulgar and unbred." Stanhope and Eugenia's two sons, Charles and Philip, were born in London in 1761 and 1763 respectively, and it was not until 25 September 1767 that he and Eugenia were married in Dresden. Stanhope went to great lengths to keep the relationship a secret from his father to the extent of engaging a separate habitation for his wife and children.

He had never lived up to the demands of his father to adopt the habits and graces he insisted were essential to succeed in life. His father issued repeated threats that unless he did as he was told he would lose his father’s love, and if he were not to succeed in life it would be his own fault. At the age of 14 his father wrote: “I shall love you extremely, while you deserve it; but not one moment longer.”

He did not rise as expected in the diplomatic services and preferred instead an unpretentious domestic life. Often in ill health, he died of dropsy in St Gervais, France, on 16 November 1768, aged only 36, and is buried at Vaucluse. It was generally believed that only after the death of his beloved son that Lord Chesterfield learned of the existence of Philip's wife and children. He received them kindly and took upon himself the cost of education and maintenance of his grandsons and became very attached to them.

When Lord Chesterfield died in 1773, his will caused much gossip. He provided for the two grandsons with £100 annuity each, as well as £10,000, but left Eugenia Stanhope nothing. Faced with the problem of supporting herself, she sold Chesterfield's letters to a publisher, J. Dodsley, for 1500 guineas. Chesterfield had never intended them for publication, and the result was a storm of controversy because of their perceived "immorality", which ensured several reprints and their steady sale for at least 100 years. Eugenia died at her home in Limpsfield, Surrey, in 1783 and had acquired property and a comfortable fortune. She also wrote The deportment of a married life: laid down in a series of letters, which was published in 1798.

In a codicil to her will, she directed her sons "to live in strict unity and friendship with one another, not to dissipate their fortunes and to beware of all human beings".

Philip and Eugenia's sons were educated in the law. The elder son Philip married Elizabeth Daniel, had two daughters and died aged 38 in 1801. The survivor of his two daughters, Eugenia Keir, née Stanhope, died at Madeira in 1823, with no surviving issue. The younger son, Charles, died in 1845, aged 83, without issue and bequeathed most of his estate, which included Lord Chesterfield's bequests to both himself and his late brother and his mother's properties, to the sons of Elizabeth Daniel's brother Edward Daniel, barrister-at-law.

Parliament of Great Britain
| Preceded by Charles Trelawny; Sir George Lee | MP for Liskeard; 1754–1761 with Edmund Nugent 1754–1759; Philip Stephens 1759–1761 | Succeeded by Anthony Champion; Philip Stephens |
| Preceded by Anthony Champion; Edward Eliot | MP for St Germans; 1761–1765 with Edward Eliot | Succeeded by William Hussey; Edward Eliot |
Diplomatic posts
| Unknown | British resident at Hamburg; 1752–1759 | Unknown |
| Unknown | British envoy to the Imperial Diet at Ratisbon; 1763–1764 | Succeeded by William Gordon |
| Preceded by David Murray, Viscount Stormont | British envoy to Saxony; 1764–1768 | Succeeded by Robert Murray Keith (the younger) |
