= John Peachey, 2nd Baron Selsey =

British politician (1749–1816)

John Peachey, 2nd Baron Selsey (16 March 1749 – 27 June 1816), styled The Honourable John Peachey between 1794 and 1808, was a British politician who sat in the House of Commons from 1776 to 1790.

Peachey was the son of James Peachey, 1st Baron Selsey, by Lady Georgiana Caroline Scott, daughter of Henry Scott, 1st Earl of Deloraine.

Peachey was returned to Parliament for St Germans in 1776, a seat he held until 1780, and then represented New Shoreham between 1780 and 1790. In 1808 he entered the House of Lords on the death of his father.

Lord Selsey married Hester Elizabeth Jennings in 1784. They had four children:

- James Peachey (1783-1811)
- Captain Henry John Peachey, 3rd Baron Selsey (1787-1838)
- John William Peachey (1788-1837)
- Caroline Mary Vernon Harcourt (née Peachey)(1790-1871).

He died in June 1816, aged 67, and was succeeded by his eldest surviving son, Henry. Lady Selsey died in April 1837.

Parliament of Great Britain
Preceded by Benjamin Langlois; John Pownall	Member of Parliament for St Germans; 1776–1780; With: Benjamin Langlois	Succeeded by Edward James Eliot; Dudley Long
Preceded by Charles Goring; Sir John Shelley, Bt	Member of Parliament for New Shoreham; 1780–1790; With: Sir Cecil Bisshopp, Bt	Succeeded by Sir Harry Goring, Bt; John Clater Aldridge
Peerage of Great Britain
Preceded by James Peachey	Baron Selsey; 1808–1816	Succeeded by Henry John Peachey
