= Thomas Goddard (Wiltshire MP) =

Member of Parliament for Wiltshire
- In office 24 March 1767 – 12 August 1770

Personal details
- Born: 1722
- Died: 12 August 1770 (aged 47–48)
- Relations: Ambrose Goddard (brother); Thomas Goddard (nephew)

Thomas Goddard (1722 – 12 August 1770) was an English politician. A member of the Goddard family, he served as a Member of Parliament (MP) for Wiltshire.

== See also ==
- List of MPs elected in the 1768 British general election
