= Charles Cocks, 1st Baron Somers =

British politician

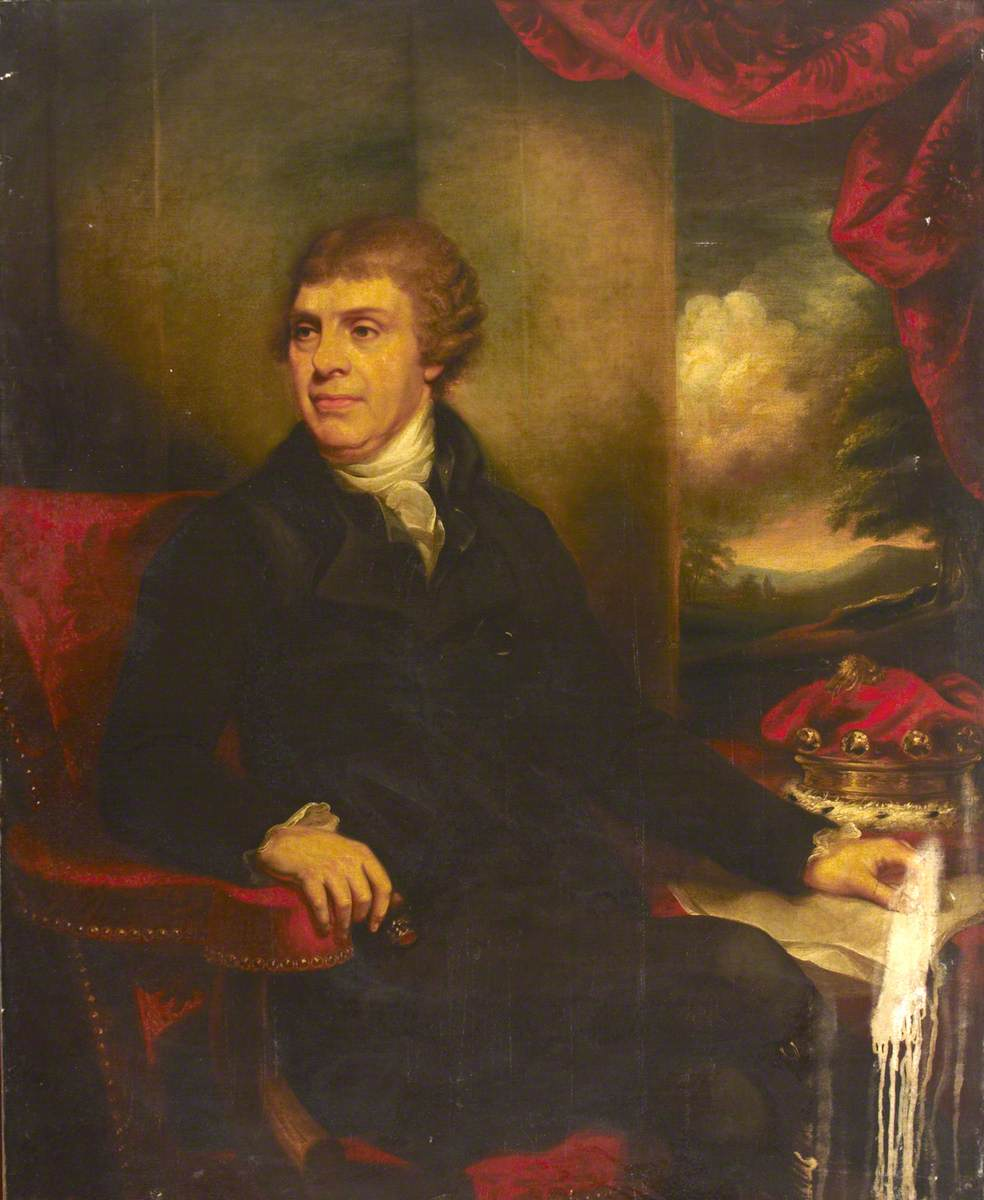
- portrait by Mather Brown
- Born: 29 June 1725
- Died: 30 January 1806 (aged 80)
- Alma mater: Worcester College
- Occupation: Politician, lawyer
- Spouse(s): Elizabeth Eliot, Anne Pole
- Children: 9
- Parent(s): John Cocks; Mary Cocks
- Relatives: James Cocks, Philip Cocks
- Titles: Baron Somers (1, death, 1784–1806)

Charles Cocks, 1st Baron Somers (29 June 1725 – 30 January 1806), known as Sir Charles Cocks, 1st Baronet, from 1772 to 1784, was a British politician who sat in the House of Commons from 1747 to 1784.

== Life ==
Cocks was the son of John Cocks and his wife Mary Cocks who was his cousin and daughter of Thomas Cocks of Castleditch and was born on 29 June 1725. His paternal grandfather Charles Cocks was the husband of Mary Somers, sister of John Somers, 1st Baron Somers, Lord Chancellor of England. He matriculated at Worcester College, Oxford in 1742 and entered Lincoln's Inn in 1745, where he was called to the bar in 1750.

Cocks was elected Member of Parliament for Reigate in the 1747 general election and held the seat until 1784. He was appointed Clerk of Deliveries of the Ordnance from 1758 to 1772 and Clerk of the Ordnance from 1772 to 1782.

He succeeded his father in 1771 and the following year was created a baronet of Dumbleton in the County of Gloucester, and on 17 May 1784 the barony inherited from his great-uncle was revived when he was raised to the peerage as Baron Somers, of Evesham in the County of Worcester.

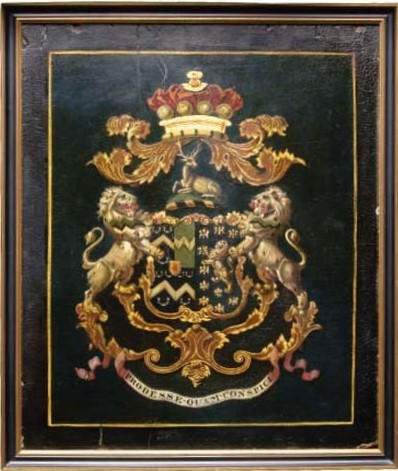
A panel with the coat of arms of Charles Cocks, 1st Baron Somers, displaying his arms impaling the paternal arms of his second wife, Anne Pole.

He is buried in Eastnor, Herefordshire with a monument sculpted by William Humphries Stephens.

== Family ==
Lord Somers married, firstly, Elizabeth, daughter of Richard Eliot and Harriot, natural daughter of James Craggs the Younger, in 1759. After her death in 1771 he married, secondly, Anne, daughter of Reginald Pole, in 1772. There were children from both marriages. Cocks was succeeded in his titles by his son from his first marriage, John, who was created Earl Somers in 1821. Anne, Lady Somers, died in 1833.

Parliament of Great Britain
Preceded by James Cocks Philip Yorke	Member of Parliament for Reigate; 1747– 1784; With: Philip Yorke 1747; Charles Yorke 1747–1768; John Yorke 1768–1784	Succeeded by William Bellingham Edward Leeds
Political offices
Preceded by Job Staunton Charlton	Clerk of the Deliveries of the Ordnance; 1758–1772	Succeeded by Benjamin Langlois
Preceded by William Rawlinson Earle	Clerk of the Ordnance; 1772–1782	Succeeded by Gibbs Crawfurd
Peerage of Great Britain
New creation	Baron Somers; 1784–1806	Succeeded by John Somers Cocks
Baronetage of Great Britain
New creation	Baronet (of Dumbleton); 1772–1806	Succeeded by John Somers Cocks
