= Samuel Salt =

English lawyer and politician

Samuel Salt (died 1792) was an English lawyer and Whig politician who sat in the House of Commons from 1768 to 1790. He is also known for his connection to the family of author Charles Lamb.

== Early life ==
Salt was the son of John Salt, vicar of Audley, Staffordshire. He was admitted at the Middle Temple in 1741, at the Inner Temple in 1745, and was called to the bar in 1753. He was a Director of the South Sea Company from 1769 to 1775 and was deputy Governor from 1775 until his death.

== Political career ==
Salt was a lawyer for the Eliot family of Port Eliot. On the interest of the Eliot family Salt was returned to parliament at the 1768 general election for their pocket-boroughs of St Germans and Liskeard. He chose to sit for Liskeard and was returned there again in 1774 and 1780. In politics he was a Whig.

Salt was expected to stand again at Liskeard in the 1784 general election but instead he stood for Aldeburgh in Suffolk on the interest of Philip Champion de Crespigny. Crespigny's brother was also a director of the South Sea Company. Salt did not stand in 1790

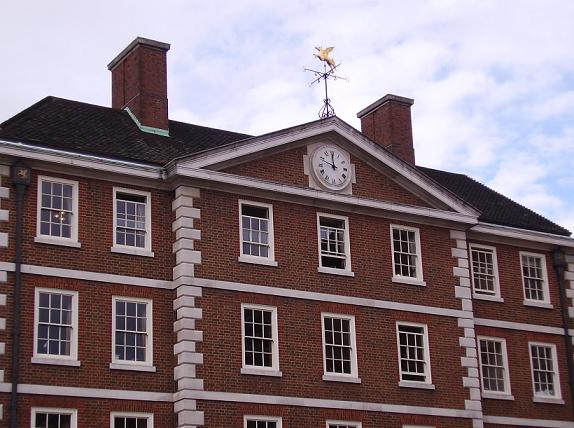
Crown Office Row, Inner Temple, London

== Lamb family ==
John Lamb, father of Charles Lamb, was Salt's clerk for nearly 40 years. Charles was born in Crown Office Row, where Salt owned chambers, and it was the home of the Lamb family until 1792. Salt procured the admission of Charles to Christ's Hospital. Through Salt's influence as a governor of the South Sea Company, Charles and his elder brother obtained clerkships under the company.

== Later years ==
Salt became bencher at the Inner Temple in 1782, reader in 1787 and treasurer in 1788. He died at his chambers in Crown Office Row, Inner Temple, on 27 July 1792, and was buried in a vault of the Temple Church. A shield with his coat-of-arms was placed in the sixteenth panel (counting from the west) on the north side of the Inner Temple hall. He was unmarried.

== Notes ==
Attribution

This article incorporates text from a publication now in the public domain: Lee, Sidney, ed. (1897). "Salt, Samuel". Dictionary of National Biography. Vol. 50. London: Smith, Elder & Co.

Parliament of Great Britain
Preceded by Edward Eliot; William Hussey	Member of Parliament for St Germans; 1768; With: Edward Eliot	Succeeded by Benjamin Langlois; George Jennings
Preceded by Anthony Champion; Philip Stephens	Member of Parliament for Liskeard; 1768–1784; With: Edward Eliot 1768–74; Edward Gibbon 1774–80; Hon. Wilbraham Tollemache 1780–84	Succeeded by Edward James Eliot; John Eliot
Preceded by Martyn Fonnereau; Philip Champion Crespigny	Member of Parliament for Aldeburgh; 1784–1790; With: Philip Champion Crespigny	Succeeded by Lord Grey of Groby; Thomas Grenville
