= Sir John Hynde Cotton, 4th Baronet =

English politician

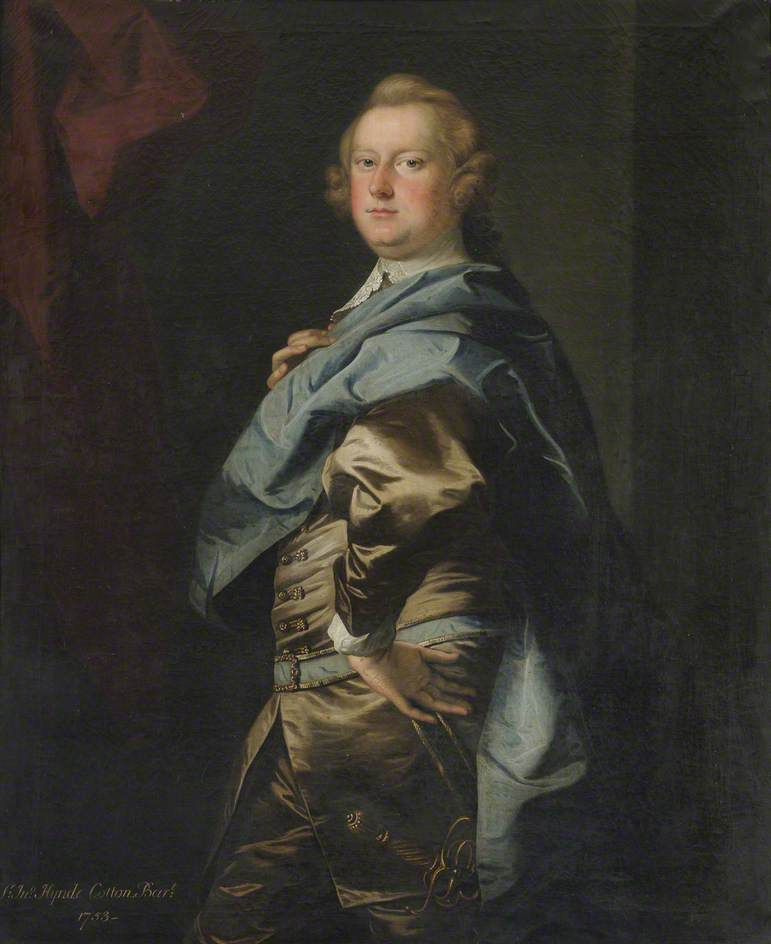
Sir John Hynde Cotton, 4th Bt, painting by Thomas Hudson, 1753.

Sir John Hynde Cotton, 4th Baronet (1717 – 23 January 1795), of Madingley Hall, Cambridgeshire, was an English politician.

He was a Member (MP) of the Parliament of Great Britain for St Germans 1741 to 1747, for Marlborough 18 February 1752 to 1761 and for Cambridgeshire 22 March 1764 to 1780.

He married the heiress Anne Parsons (daughter of Humphrey Parsons) on 1 July 1745. The couple had ten children, among whom Admiral Sir Charles Cotton (5th Baronet) and the Reverend Alexander Cotton.

Parliament of Great Britain
Preceded by The Lord Baltimore; Charles Montagu	Member of Parliament for St Germans; 1741–1747; With: James Newsham	Succeeded by Richard Eliot; Thomas Potter
Preceded by Sir John Hynde Cotton, 3rd Bt; John Talbot	Member of Parliament for Marlborough; 1752–1761; With: John Talbot 1752–54; Hon. John Ward 1754–61	Succeeded by Hon. Robert Brudenell; Lord Brudendell
Preceded by Viscount Royston; Marquess of Granby	Member of Parliament for Cambridgeshire; 1764–1780; With: Marquess of Granby 1764–70; Sir Sampson Gideon, Bt 1770–80	Succeeded by Lord Robert Manners; Viscount Royston
Baronetage of England
Preceded by John Hynde Cotton	Baronet (of Landwade); 1752–1795	Succeeded by Charles Cotton
