= Dudley Long North =

British politician (1748–1829)

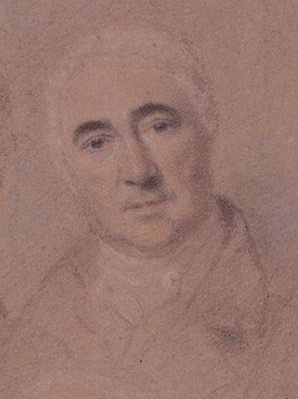
- Portrait of Long North by William Lane

Member of Parliament
- In office 1 November 1780 – 24 October 1806
- Preceded by: Benjamin Langlois
- Succeeded by: William Praed
- Constituency: St Germans (1780–1784); Great Grimsby (1784–1796); Banbury (1796–1806)
- In office 22 June 1807 – 9 February 1821
- Preceded by: George Canning
- Succeeded by: Charles Cavendish
- Constituency: Newtown (1807–1808); Banbury (1808–1812); Richmond (1812–1818); Haddington Burghs (1818–1820); Newtown (1820–1821)

Personal details
- Born: Dudley Long; 14 March 1748 (baptised) Saxmundham, Sussex
- Died: 21 February 1829 (aged 80) Brompton, London
- Party: Whig (Foxite)
- Spouse: Sophia Anderson-Pelham (m. 1802)
- Relations: Dudley North (grandfather)
- Parent(s): Charles Long & Mary North
- Education: Emmanuel College, Cambridge
- Occupation: Politician

Dudley Long North (14 March 1748 – 21 February 1829) was an English Whig politician, member of Parliament. He was of the family of British prime minister Lord North, and brother-in-law of Charles Anderson-Pelham, 1st Earl of Yarborough of Appuldurcombe House.

== Early life ==
Baptised at Saxmundham, Suffolk, Dudley Long was the younger of two sons of Charles Long (1705–1778), landowner of Hurts Hall, Suffolk, and his wife, Mary, daughter and coheir of Dudley North of Little Glemham, Suffolk, and granddaughter of Sir Dudley North. On 2 May 1789, he changed his surname to North to inherit Little Glemham from his aunt Anne Herbert.

== Parliamentary career ==
He was educated at Bury St Edmunds grammar school from 1758 and Emmanuel College, Cambridge, from 1766, where he graduated with a BA in 1771 and an MA in 1774. In 1769, he entered Lincoln's Inn, but was not called to the bar. Of ample fortune, his father having left him £25,000 and a joint interest in his Jamaican plantations, he entered parliament in 1780 at Lord Rockingham's instigation, as MP for St Germans on the Eliot interest. His kinsman Lord North was then still Prime Minister, but due to a speech impediment, Long was discouraged from speaking in the House of Commons. His shyness, despite inheriting the family's corrosive wit, led Dr Johnson, when they were introduced in 1781, to dismiss him as a man 'of genteel appearance, and that is all'. Nevertheless, Long silently supported the Prime Minister, and in 1783 was mentioned as a possible secretary of embassy at Paris.

Long switched to Great Grimsby at the general election in 1784, a more expensive constituency under the patronage of his father-in-law Charles Anderson Pelham. He was in opposition together with Lord North, and aligned himself with North's ally Charles James Fox. Already a member of Brooks's, Long joined the Whig Club in 1785, and Fox relied on him as a dinner host to strengthen party unity, and for political counsel. He was instrumental in the Impeachment of Warren Hastings. On 11 February 1793, the contested Grimsby election of 1790 was eventually voided, and he secured re-election on 17 April. He had briefly joined the Friends of the People Society before seceding on 4 June 1792, but maintained his loyalty to Fox, who was deserted by conservative Whigs, and in 1793 backed the subscription to pay Fox's debts. His success at Grimsby in 1796 was thought unlikely, and he found another seat, for Banbury, on the North family interest, which he held unopposed until 1806. A supporter of parliamentary reform in 1793 and 1797, he disagreed with the decision of Fox to secede from the house in the latter year; he returned to oppose Pitt's taxes and Irish policy, and regularly attended the House of Commons from 1800 onwards. On the peace of Amiens and the war in Ceylon, he voted with the government, but otherwise opposed Addington, and Pitt in his second term of office.

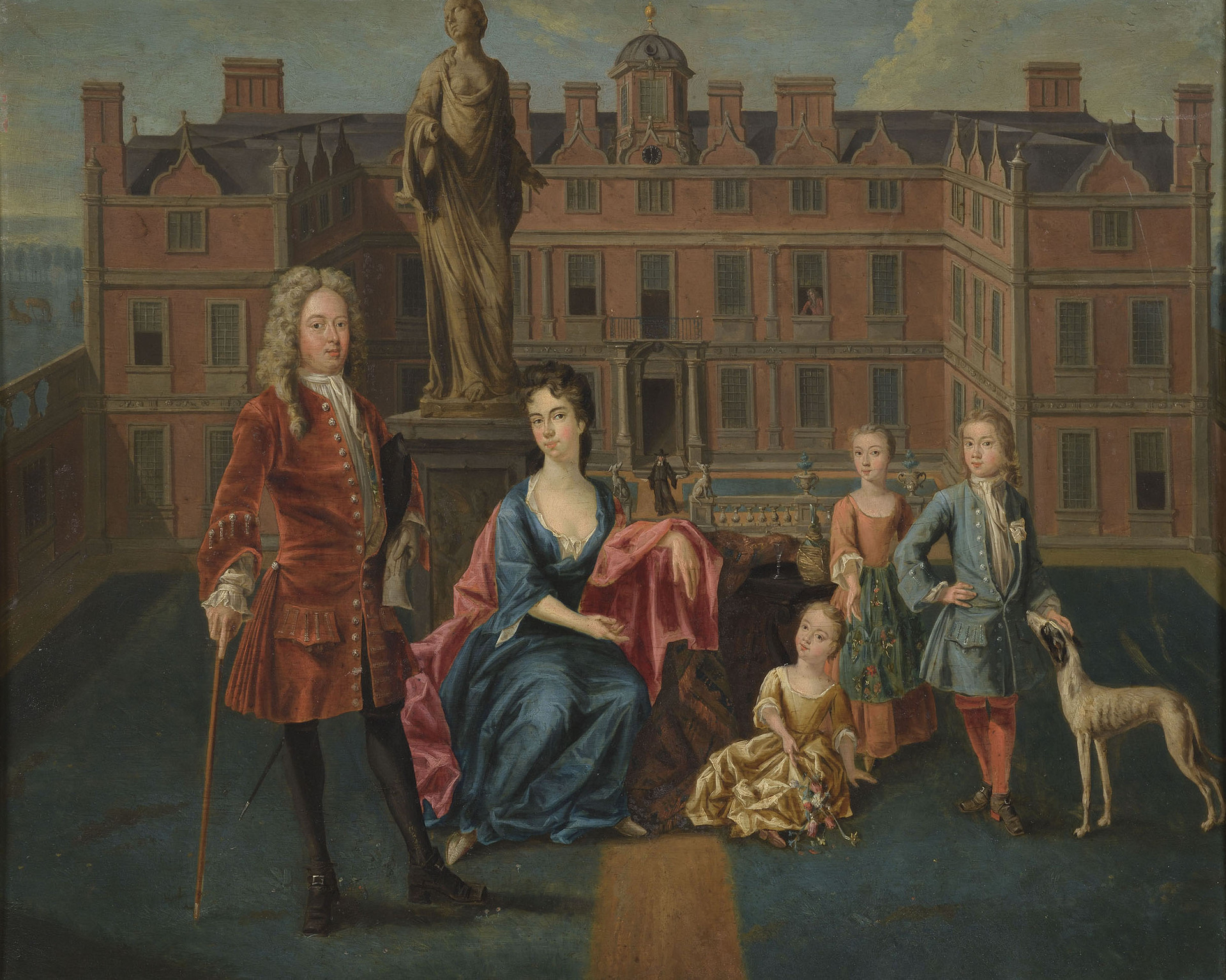
Glemham Hall, by artist Peter Vanderbank, seat of Dudley Long North and his family

In 1806, even though his friends were in office in George Grenville's administration, a surprise defeat occurred at Banbury, a one-seat constituency with only eighteen electors. In the 1807 election he tied with the usurper, William Praed, and in a fresh election, on 16 February 1808, regained the seat, by 5 votes to 3. He then vacated his seat of Newtown, Isle of Wight, where he had been returned on the Yarborough interest. He had expected his patron Lord Guilford to pay for these elections, which had cost Long £5000, especially as he had promised to bequeath his own estate to Guilford. Guilford asked him to relinquish Banbury in favour of his nephew at the dissolution in 1812, which left Long feeling justifiably let down. Yet in 1811 an offer was made by Charles Grey, which Long declined, of a sinecure if the Whigs returned to office, a hope dashed by the desertion of the Prince Regent. In 1812 after a protracted search, a seat was obtained for him by Earl Fitzwilliam in Richmond, Yorkshire, on the Dundas interest. In December that year, on succeeding his elder brother Charles to the family estate of Hurts Hall, he resumed his former surname, thereby becoming Dudley Long North. In parliament he voted with the opposition in favour of Catholic relief, against the resumption of war with Bonaparte in 1815, and for financial retrenchment. However, to the dismay of Earl Fitzwilliam in 1817, he also opposed the suspension of civil liberties and supported parliamentary reform. In the next parliament he sat on his friend Lord Lauderdale's interest for Jedburgh burghs (1818–20). He voted for Francis Burdett's critical motion of 1 July 1819, and was a supporter of George Tierney's move to lead the Whigs in the Commons, though he was absent from the last session of that parliament. He again represented Newtown, Isle of Wight, in 1820, but on 9 February 1821 resigned his seat.

== Marriage and death ==
On 6 November 1802, he married Sophia (1775–1856), daughter of his former patron at Grimsby, Charles Anderson Pelham, by then first Baron Yarborough, and his wife, Sophia Aufrère. They had no children. Long North was dogged by ill health in his later years, which was exacerbated by his unwarranted anxiety about the state of his finances. A pallbearer at Edmund Burke's funeral, a mourner at Sir Joshua Reynolds's, and a patron of the poet George Crabbe, few of Long North's witticisms are preserved, despite his popularity in both literary and political circles; they were for the most part confined to his friends. He died at Brompton, London, on 21 February 1829, and was buried in St Andrew's Church at Little Glemham in Suffolk. A full-length Italian marble statue of him, erected by his widow, sits in the North chapel.

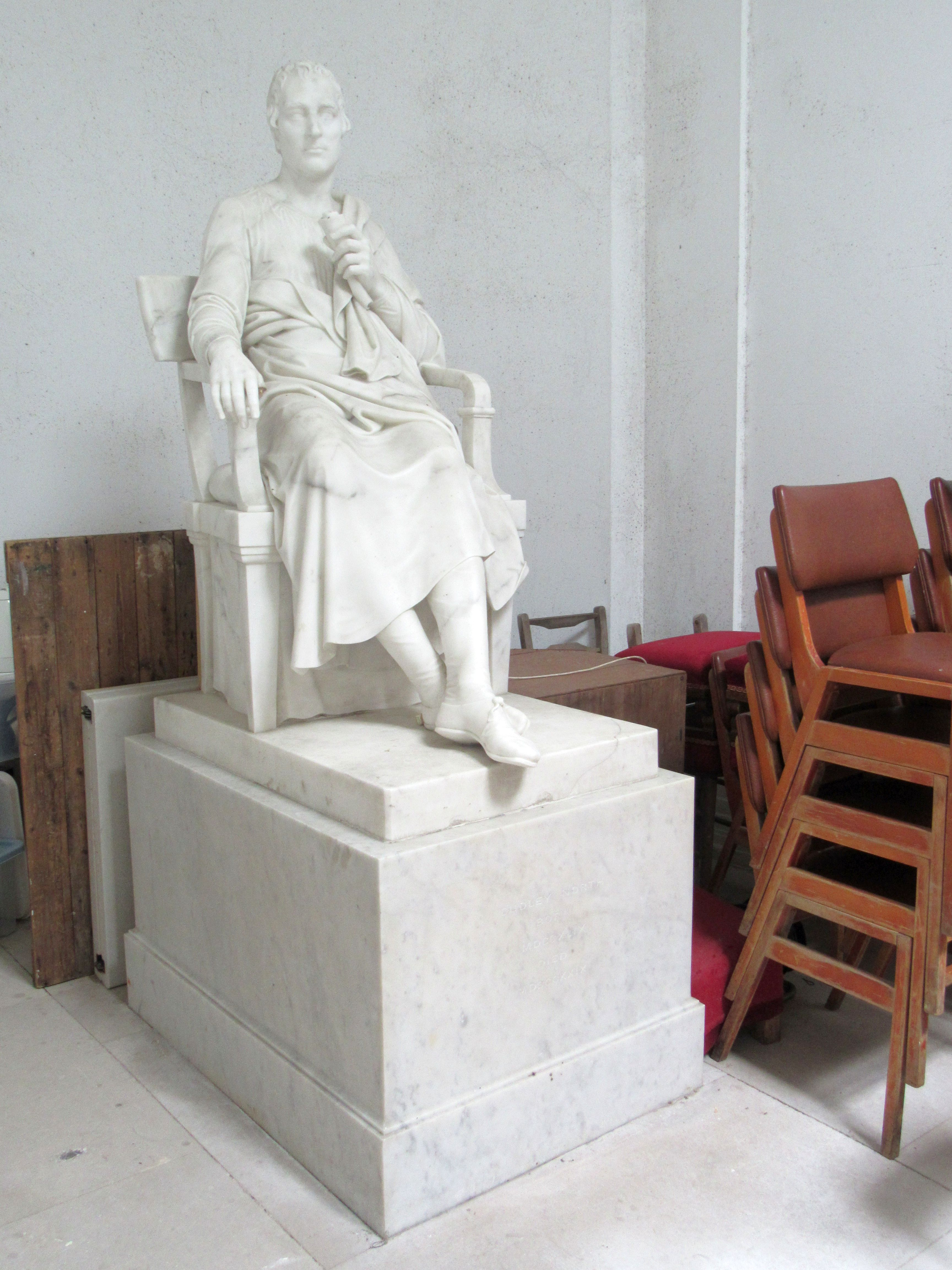
Dudley Long North memorial in St Andrew's Church, Little Glemham

Parliament of Great Britain
Preceded by John Peachey; Benjamin Langlois	Member of Parliament for St Germans; 1780–1784; With: Edward James Eliot	Succeeded by Abel Smith; John Hamilton
Preceded by John Harrison; Francis Eyre	Member of Parliament for Great Grimsby; 1784–1796; With: John Harrison	Succeeded by Ayscoghe Boucherett; William Mellish
Preceded by William Holbech	Member of Parliament for Banbury; 1796–1800	Succeeded by Parliament of the United Kingdom
Parliament of the United Kingdom
Preceded by Parliament of Great Britain	Member of Parliament for Banbury; 1801–1806	Succeeded by William Praed
Preceded by William Praed	Member of Parliament for Banbury; 1808–1812	Succeeded by Frederick Sylvester North Douglas
Preceded by George Dundas; Robert Chaloner	Member of Parliament for Richmond; 1812–1818; With: Robert Chaloner	Succeeded by Thomas Dundas; Viscount Maitland
Preceded by Anthony Maitland	Member of Parliament for Haddington Burghs; 1818–1820	Succeeded by Sir Hew Dalrymple-Hamilton, Bt
