= Edward James Eliot =

British politician (1758-1797)

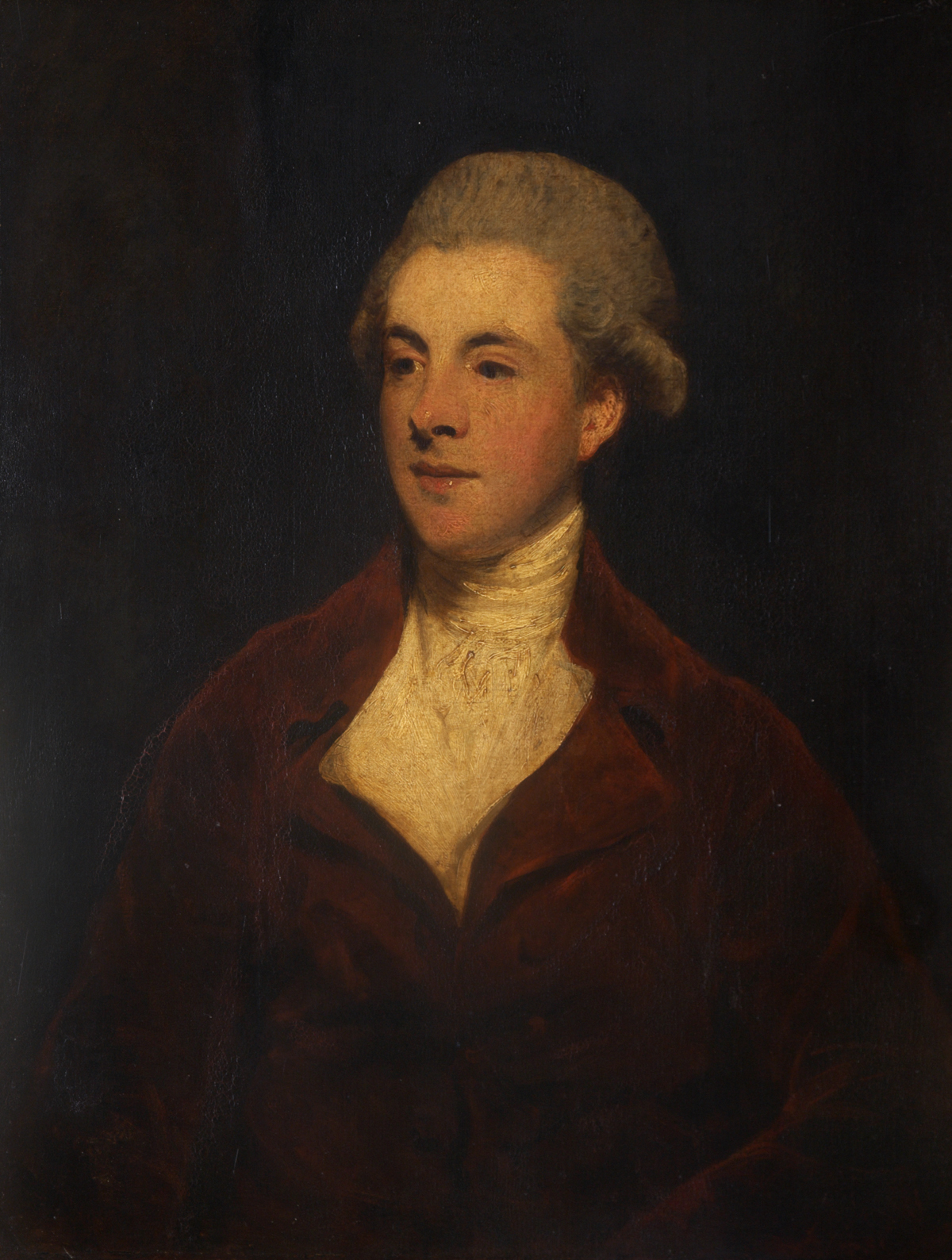
- Portrait by Joshua Reynolds

Member of Parliament for St Germans
- In office 1780–1784 Serving with Dudley Long North
- Preceded by: Benjamin Langlois; John Peachey
- Succeeded by: John Hamilton; Abel Smith

Member of Parliament for Liskeard
- In office 1784–1797 Serving with John Eliot
- Preceded by: Samuel Salt; Wilbraham Tollemache
- Succeeded by: John Eliot; The Earl of Inchiquin

Baron Eliot
- In office 1804–1797
- Preceded by: Edward Craggs-Eliot
- Succeeded by: John Eliot

Personal details
- Born: 24 August 1758 Port Eliot, Cornwall
- Died: 20 September 1797 (aged 39) Port Eliot, Cornwall
- Spouse: Lady Harriot Pitt (m. 1785; died 1786)
- Children: 1
- Parents: Edward Craggs-Eliot (father); Catherine Elliston (mother)
- Relatives: John Eliot (brother); William Eliot (brother); William Pitt the Elder (father-in-law)
- Education: Pembroke College, Cambridge

Edward James Eliot (24 August 1758 – 20 September 1797) was an English Member of Parliament.

== Life ==
Eliot was born in Cornwall, the son of Catherine (c.1735–1804), daughter and heir of Edward Elliston of Gestingthorpe, Essex, an East India Company captain, and Edward Craggs-Eliot (1727–1804), politician, created Baron Eliot in 1784.

He went to Pembroke College, Cambridge in 1775, becoming friends with the future Prime Minister, William Pitt the Younger, and graduated with an MA in 1780. He was elected Member of Parliament for St Germans, Cornwall from 1780 and for Liskeard from 1784. He soon became a Treasury minister from 1782, and was a member of the government of the Younger Pitt from 1783, being appointed King's Remembrancer in the Exchequer of pleas in 1785.

On 24 September 1785 he married Harriot Pitt, the younger daughter of William Pitt the Elder and sister to the Younger Pitt. One year later, and five days after the birth of their only child, a daughter named Harriot Hester, Eliot's wife died as a result of complication from childbirth. Eliot never recovered from the grief of losing his wife.

After Harriot's death, Eliot moved to Broomfield, near Clapham, where he came into contact with the Clapham Sect of evangelical reformers, whose cause he espoused. He had been a friend of William Wilberforce for some years, and the pair of them had accompanied Pitt to France. Now he found himself living close to Wilberforce and other leading members of the group dubbed 'the Saints'. He began to take an active part in their reforming causes, including the abolition of the slave trade, prison reform and poor relief, the Proclamation Society, and Bishop Porteus' Sunday Observance bill. He was active in lobbying the cause of the Clapham Sect in parliament and acted as a mediator between Wilberforce and Pitt in their campaigns.

The 1792 Slave Trade Bill passed the House of Commons mangled and mutilated by the modifications and amendments of Pitt, Earl of Mornington, Edward James Eliot and the Attorney General, it lay for years, in the House of Lords.

In 1793, having resigned from the Treasury on health grounds, Eliot was appointed joint commissioner for Indian affairs. He became an investor in the British East India Company stock, and was expected to become governor-general of Bengal. However, he suffered from a recurring chronic stomach disorder which made it impossible for him to take up that office.

Eliot died at Port Eliot, Cornwall on 17 September 1797, and was buried at St Germans on 26 September 1797. (True Briton, London Newspaper, Tuesday, 26 Sept 1797. The church record for EJE's burial was apparently entered belatedly, when his burial date was entered as 3 October 1797. His true death date can be found on the silver plaque at St Germans Church.) He had remained close to Pitt and Wilberforce, who both lamented his passing. His brother John succeeded to the barony and in 1815 was created Earl of St Germans.

Parliament of Great Britain
Preceded by Benjamin Langlois; John Peachey	Member of Parliament for St Germans; 1780–1784; With: Dudley Long North	Succeeded by John Hamilton; Abel Smith
Preceded by Samuel Salt; Wilbraham Tollemache	Member of Parliament for Liskeard; 1784–1797; With: John Eliot	Succeeded by John Eliot; The Earl of Inchiquin
Preceded by Samuel Smith; Sir Charles Hamilton, Bt	Member of Parliament for St Germans; 1790; With: Marquess of Lorne	Succeeded by Marquess of Lorne; William Eliot
Political offices
Preceded by Felton Lionel Hervey and his father	King's Remembrancer; 1785–1797	Succeeded by Thomas Steele
