= Pownal =

Pownal may refer to:

- Pownal, Prince Edward Island, in Queens County, Prince Edward Island, Canada
- Pownal, Maine, United States, a New England town
- Pownal, Vermont, United States, a New England town
  - Pownal (CDP), Vermont, United States, village within the town

== See also ==
- Pownall (disambiguation)
