= William Humphries Stephens =

British sculptor

William Humphries Stephens (1739 – c.1820) was an 18th/19th century British sculptor.

== Life ==
He was born in 1739 the son of Joseph Stephens, a stonecutter in Worcester. He was apprenticed to his father in 1751 and became a Freeman mason in 1760. He initially in partnership with a Mr Bott and early works are signed Bott & Stephens.

Around 1787 his son Joseph Stephens joined as an apprentice and became a junior partner around 1794.

== Works ==
=== Under Apprenticeship ===
Tomb of Thomas Parker in Longden (1751)

=== Bott & Stephens ===
- Memorial to Richard Carwardine at St John's Church in Bedwardine (1763)

=== Stephens & Co ===
- Monument to William Hankins at Dymock (1771)
- Monument to Thomas Dunn in All Saints Church in Evesham (1777)
- Memorial to Arthur Charlett in Fladbury (1779)
- Monument to Robert Bateson in Bourton-on-the-Water (1779)
- Monument to Robert Woodward in Worcester Cathedral (1780)
- Monument to Sarah Hall in Ledbury (1780)
- Monument to Mary Astley in Worcester Cathedral (1782)
- Monument to William Bach in Leominster (1785)
- Memorial to Rev Hudson Boyce at Fladbury (1786)
- Monument to Patience Turner in All Saints Church in Worcester (1786)
- Monument to Rev James Gyles at Powick (1792)
- Monument to Mary and Richard Clarke in Gloucester Cathedral (1792)
- Monument to Jonathan Green in Ashford Bowdler (1792)
- Monument to John Williams in All Saints Church in Worcester (1793)
- Memorial to Mary Hall in Worcester Cathedral (1794)
- Monument to Rev George Martin in Overbury (1796)
- Monument to Daniel Ellis in Elmore, Gloucestershire (1797)
- Monument to Joseph Berwick in St Nicholas Church in Worcester (1798)
- Memorial to Bishop Hurd in Worcester Cathedral (1808)
- Memorial to Lord Somers at Eastnor, Herefordshire (1808)
