= Lords Justices appointed during the absence of King George I in 1719 =

The Lords Justices were appointed by George I while he was away, in Germany, in the capacity of Elector of Hanover.

- William Wake, Archbishop of Canterbury;
- Evelyn Pierrepont, 1st Duke of Kingston-upon-Hull, Lord President of the Council;
- Henry Grey, 1st Duke of Kent, Lord Privy Seal;
- John Campbell, 2nd Duke of Argyll, Lord Steward of the Household;
- Thomas Pelham-Holles, 1st Duke of Newcastle, Lord Chamberlain;
- Charles Paulet, 2nd Duke of Bolton;
- John Churchill, 1st Duke of Marlborough, Captain General;
- John Ker, 1st Duke of Roxburghe, Secretary of State for Scotland;
- Charles Spencer, 3rd Earl of Sunderland, First Commissioner of the Treasury and Groom of the Stool;
- James Berkeley, 3rd Earl of Berkeley, First Commissioner of the Admiralty;
- James Stanhope, 1st Earl Stanhope, Secretary of State for the Northern Department;
- James Craggs the Younger, Secretary of State for the Southern Department.
