= John Pownall =

British office holder and politician

John Pownall (1724–1795) was a British office holder and politician who sat in the House of Commons in 1775-76.

== Early life ==
Pownall was baptised at Lincoln in 1724. He was the second surviving son of William Pownall and his second wife Sarah Burniston, daughter of John Burniston, deputy governor of Bombay. He was educated at Lincoln Grammar School. He married Mary Lillingston, daughter of Bowden Lillingston of Ferriby, Yorkshire.

== Administrative career ==
Pownall became Clerk of the Board of Trade in 1741 and became solicitor and clerk of reports in 1745. He was joint secretary in 1753 and became secretary in 1758, remaining until May 1776. He was under-secretary of state at the American department from January 1768 to May 1776. He was also a naval officer in Jamaica from 1755 to 1771 when he became provost marshal general of the Leeward Islands. He was for many years Deputy Lieutenant and Justice of the Peace for Lincolnshire.

== Political career ==
In November 1775, Pownall was returned as Member of Parliament for St Germans by Edward Eliot in a by-election on 23 November 1775. He probably saw a parliamentary seat as a stepping stone to a profitable post, as in 1776 he was appointed Commissioner of Excise and resigned his seat in May.

== Later life and legacy ==
Pownall's post as provost marshal general of the Leeward Islands was also confirmed for life in 1776. In 1785 he became Commissioner of Customs, instead of Excise. He retired from all public posts in 1788 except as a magistrate. He was a Fellow of the Society of Antiquaries and published several articles on archaeology.

Pownall died on 17 July 1795, at Great George Street, Westminster, aged 70. His eldest son Sir George Pownall became a member of the legislative council in Quebec.

== Publications ==
- Account of a Roman Tile discovered at Reculver Archaeologia, vol. VIII. p. 79
- Some Sepulchral Antiquities discovered at Lincoln Archaeologia vol. X. p. 345
- Admeasurements of the Keeps of Canterbury and Chilham Castles The Gentleman's Magazine 1794, vol. LX1V. p. 999

Parliament of Great Britain
| Preceded by Edward Eliot; Benjamin Langlois | Member of Parliament for St Germans; 1775–1776; With: Benjamin Langlois | Succeeded by John Peachey; Benjamin Langlois |
