= Hester Santlow =

18th-century British dancer and actress

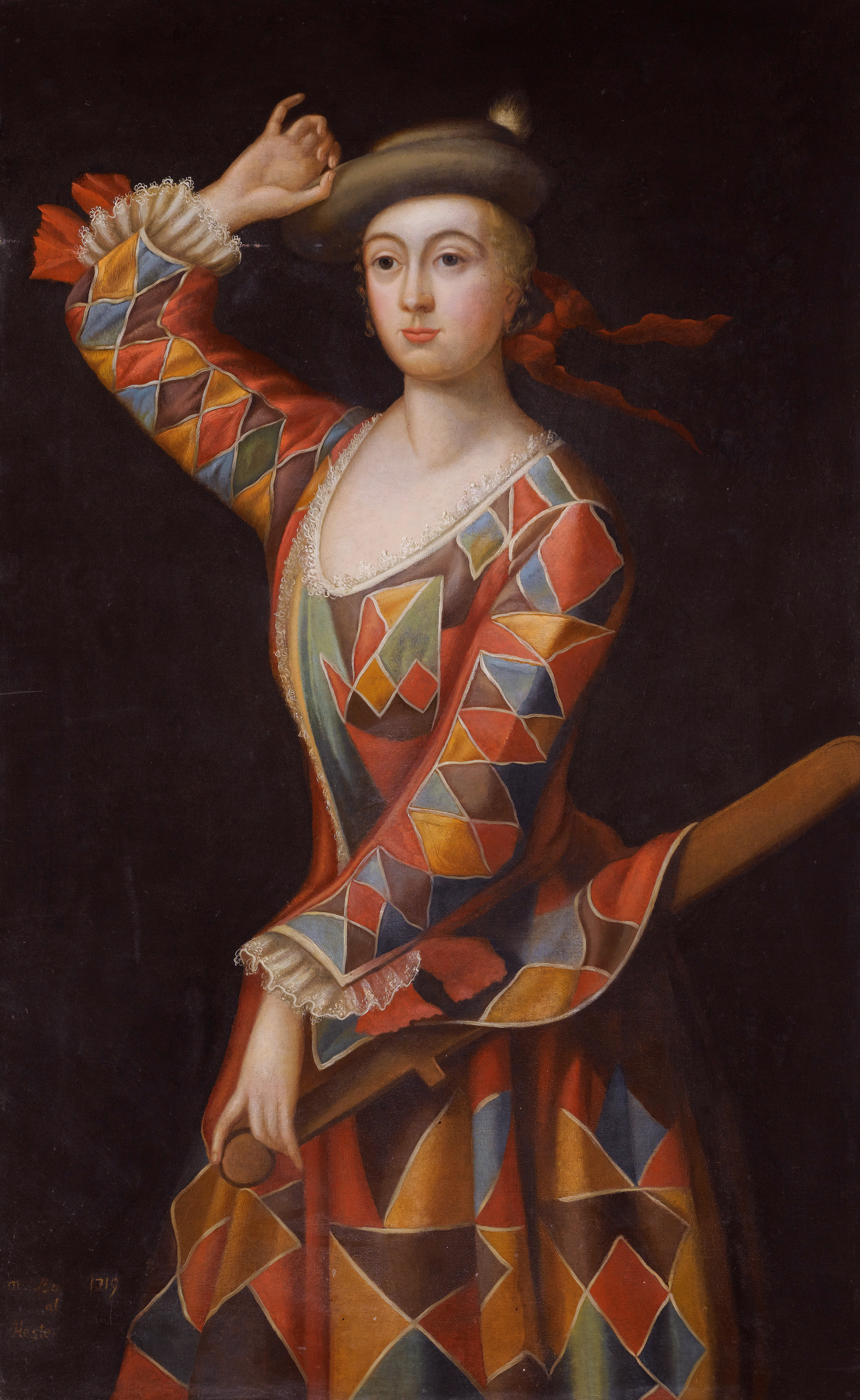
- Mrs Hester Booth, nee Santlow (circa 1690–1773) dressed as a harlequin, attributed to John Ellys
- Born: Hester Santlow; 1690
- Died: 1773 (aged 82–83)
- Occupation: actress
- Spouse(s): James Craggs , Barton Booth
- Children: Harriot Craggs

Hester Santlow (married name Hester Booth; c. 1690 – 1773) was a British ballerina and actress, who has been called "England's first ballerina". She was influential in many spheres of theatrical life.

== Life ==
Hester Santlow was born circa 1690.

=== Career ===
In 1706, Santlow made her first appearance as a dancer at Drury Lane, and three years later as an actress on the London stage. Some of her earliest roles included Harlequin, for which she earned a considerable boost in her reputation.

John Essex, in the preface of The Dancing Master (1728), his translation of Pierre Rameau's Le Maître à danser, writes:

WE have had a great many Women attempt to be Theatrical Dancers, but none ever arrived to that Height and Pitch of Applause as the incomparable Mrs. Booth, in whom Art and Nature are so beautifully wove together, that the whole Web is of a Piece so exquisitely formed to Length and Breadth, that the Produce of the many different Characters she represents is the Wonder and Admiration of the present Age, and will scarce be credited by the Succeeding. I shall beg leave to mention the Chaconne, Saraband, Menuet, in all which she appears with that Grace, Softness, and Address none can look on but with Attention, Pleasure, and Surprise. She far excels all that went before her, and must be the just Subject of Imitation to all that dare attempt to copy after her. Besides all these, the Harlequin is beyond Description, and the Hussar another opposite Character in which she has no Rival. All which shew how many extensive as well as extraordinary Qualifications must concentre in one Person to form so bright a Genius: A Subject becoming the most elevated Wit to describe, and the politest Taste to contemplate.

Around 1717, a notable incident occurred which was reported by Colley Cibber and which appeared in Apology for the Life of Colley Cibber (1740) and The Palmy Days of Nance Oldfield.

"About the year 1717," writes Cibber, "[Hester Santlow], a young actress of a desirable person, sitting in an upper box at the Opera, [Montague], a military gentleman thought this a proper opportunity to secure a little conversation with her, the particulars of which were probably no more worth repeating than it seems the Damoiselle then thought them worth listening to; for, notwithstanding the fine things he said to her, she rather chose to give the Musick the preference of her attention. This indifference was so offensive to his high heart, that he began to change the Tender into the Terrible, and, in short, proceeded at last to treat her in a style too grossly insulting for the meanest female ear to endur unresented. Upon which, being beaten too far out of her discretion, she turn'd hastily upon him with an angry look and a reply which seem'd to set his merit in so low a regard, that he thought himself oblig'd in honour to take his time to resent it.

"This was the full extent of her crime, which his glory delay'd no longer to punish than 'till the next time she was to appear upon the stage. There, in one of her best parts, wherein she drew a favourable regard and approbation from the audience, he, dispensing with the respect which some people think due to a polite assembly, began to interrupt her performance with such loud and various notes of mockery, as other young men of honour in the same place had sometimes made themselves undauntedly merry with. Thus, deaf to all murmurs or entreaties of those about him, he pursued his point, even to throwing near her such trash as no person can be suppos'd to carry about him unless to use on so particular an occasion.

"A gentlemen then behind the scenes, [James Craggs the Younger], being shock'd at his unmanly behaviour, was warm enough to say, that no man but a fool or a bully could be capable of insulting an audience or a woman in so monstrous a manner. The former valiant gentleman, to whose ear the words were soon brought by his spies, whom he had plac'd behind the scenes to observe how the action was taken there, came immediately from the pit in a heat, and demanded to know of the author of those words if he was the person that spoke them? to which he calmly reply'd, that though he had never seen him before, yet since he seem'd so earnest to be satisfy'd, he would do him the favour to own, that indeed the words were his, and that they would be the last words he should chuse to deny whoever they might fall upon.

"To conclude, their dispute was ended the next morning in Hyde Park, where the determin'd combatant who first ask'd for satisfaction was obliged afterwards to ask his life too; whether he mended it or not, I have not yet heard; but his antagonist in a few years afterwards died in one of the principal posts of the Government."

=== Private life ===
In 1713 she produced an illegitimate daughter named Harriet; the father was James Craggs. Harriet married

- firstly in 1726 Richard Eliot, having nine children, including Edward Craggs-Eliot, 1st Baron Eliot,
- secondly in 1749 to John Hamilton, by whom she had a son, John Hamilton, 1st Marquess of Abercorn.

In 1719, at Chipping Ongar, she married Barton Booth, an actor-manager. Booth died in 1733, but Santlow continued on the London stage for many years. She died at her home on 15 January 1773 leaving considerable sums to her four grandchildren.
