= William Hussey (died 1813) =

English businessman and politician

William Hussey (c.1724 – 26 January 1813) was an English businessman and politician who sat in the House of Commons for 48 years from 1765 to 1813.

== Early life ==
Hussey was baptised on 1 January 1725, the son of John Hussey, Mayor of Salisbury in 1737. On his father's death in 1739 he inherited property in Wiltshire and Dorset and became a successful clothier in Salisbury. He married firstly Mary Eyre, the daughter of John Eyre of Landford Lodge, Wiltshire, on 9 October 1752. She died on 21 May 1754. In 1755 he was elected a councillor for the city of Salisbury, becoming an alderman in 1756 and mayor in 1759. He married secondly Jane Marsh, daughter of Robert Marsh, a London merchant and Governor of the Bank of England on 5 April 1758.

== Political career ==
Hussey was returned as Member of Parliament (MP) for St Germans at a by-election on 11 June 1765. At the 1768 general election he was returned as MP for Hindon. He was elected for Salisbury in the 1774 general election and held the seat to his death. In 1784 he was a member of the St. Alban's Tavern group which tried to bring Fox and Pitt together.

Hussey died on 26 January 1813. He had a daughter by his first wife Mary. By his second wife Jane, he had a son and a daughter Mary who married William Drake (junior), MP. In his will he divided most of his property between his great-nephews Ambrose Hussey of Salisbury and John Hussey (1789-1849) of Salisbury and Lyme Regis.

Parliament of Great Britain
Preceded by Edward Eliot; Philip Stanhope	Member of Parliament for St Germans; 1765–1768; With: Edward Eliot	Succeeded by Edward Eliot; Samuel Salt
Preceded by Professor William Blackstone; Edward Morant	Member of Parliament for Hindon; 1768–1774; With: John St Leger Douglas	Succeeded by Richard Smith; Thomas Brand Hollis
Preceded by Viscount Folkestone; Hon. Stephen Fox	Member of Parliament for Salisbury; 1774–1813; With: Viscount Folkestone 1774-1776; Hon. William Henry Bouverie 1776-1802; Viscount Folkestone 1802-1813	Succeeded by Viscount Folkestone; George Purefoy-Jervoise
