= George Jennings (MP) =

British politician

George Jennings (c.1721 – 9 June 1790) was a British politician.

He was elected as a Member of Parliament (MP) for the borough of Whitchurch in Hampshire at a by-election in March 1757. He was returned for Whitchurch at the 1761 general election, and held the seat until the 1768 general election.

He was elected as an (MP) for the borough of St Germans in Cornwall at a by-election in March 1768, and held the seat until the 1774 general election. At the 1784 general election he was returned as an MP for Thetford. He held that seat until the 1790 general election.

Parliament of Great Britain
Preceded by William Powlett; Thomas Townshend	Member of Parliament for Whitchurch; 1757–1768; With: Thomas Townshend	Succeeded by Hon. Henry Wallop; Thomas Townshend
Preceded by Edward Eliot; Samuel Salt	Member of Parliament for St Germans; 1768–1774; With: Benjamin Langlois	Succeeded by Edward Eliot; Benjamin Langlois
Preceded by Earl of Euston; Richard Hopkins	Member of Parliament for Thetford; 1784–1790; With: Sir Charles Kent, Bt	Succeeded by Robert John Buxton; Joseph Randyll Burch
