= Benjamin Langlois =

British administrator and politician

Benjamin Langlois (1727–1802) was a British administrator and politician who sat in the House of Commons between 1768 and 1780.

== Early life ==
Langlois was the fourth son of Peter L’Anglois, and his wife Julie de Monceau, daughter of Major-General Isaac de Monceau de la Melonière and was born on 7 January 1727. His father was a Huguenot refugee who was naturalized in 1707, and later became a merchant at Livorno. Langlois matriculated at Christ Church, Oxford on 23 March 1745. There he was a contemporary of Lord Stormont and subsequently went with him to Warsaw in June 1756 in an unofficial capacity. In 1759, by the request of Duchess of Portland, he travelled with Marquess of Titchfield later Duke of Portland through Germany to Italy, spent a year in Turin, and went on to Florence, Italy.

When Lord Stormont was appointed ambassador to Vienna in 1763, Langlois went with him as secretary of the embassy and in Stormont's absence was in charge. But he felt unsure about his future writing to Mitchell on Feb. 1768, 'I am steering in this wide world without a compass and know no more what my fate is to be, than I did at my first step in life'.

His sister Elizabeth Langlois married Anthony Lefroy, their grandchildren included Thomas Langlois Lefroy, a possible love interest of Jane Austen.

== Political career ==
Another of Langlois' old friend who came to his assistance was Edward Eliot, who had an interest in six parliamentary seats. He offered Langlois the seat at St Germans where he had a vacancy to fill in 1768. Langlois was returned as Member of Parliament for St. Germans at the 1768 general election but did not sit in Parliament until he left Vienna in 1771 due to lack of travel funds. Langlois gratitude towards his friend was recorded in his letters to him "Had I time I would paint to you all the distress of my mind before the happy event, that you might judge my gratitude to you for so suddenly changing my prospect by what you have done"

Lady Mary Coke wrote from Vienna "Mr. Langlois, the secretary, sets out for England the end of this week. He is a sensible amiable man, and much esteemed here. He talks of returning in spring".

He, was given the post of Clerk of the Deliveries of the Ordnance in 1773. At the 1774 general election he was returned again for St Germans. In 1778 he was promoted to Storekeeper of the Ordnance and when Stormont was appointed secretary of state for the Northern Department in October 1779, joined him as under-secretary of state. He held his place at the Ordnance until September 1780, when he was made a Lord of Trade. He complained about the loss of income and was dropped by Eliot at the 1780 general election. However he kept both offices even though he was not in Parliament. He stopped attending the Board of Trade at the end of April 1781 and left it in January 1782. He lost his place at the Northern Department on the fall of the North Government in March 1782.

== Later years ==
In later years Langlois was staying with 3rd Duke of Portland much of the time at Welbeck Abbey. Sir Gilbert Elliot described him in 1788 as ”the same diplomatic, old-fashioned coxcomb as ever, and favoured us with a good deal of prose, of and concerning himself and his own consequence; but he is, with all this, an inoffensive and polite man.” Sir Egerton Brydges described him as “a good and benevolent old man, with much diplomatic experience, but most fatiguingly ceremonious, with abilities not much above the common”. Langlois died unmarried on 20 November 1802 leaving £22,000

== In Media ==
In Becoming Jane (2007), Benjamin Langlois was portrayed by Ian Richardson.

Parliament of Great Britain
Preceded by Edward Eliot; Samuel Salt	Member of Parliament for St Germans; 1768–1780; With: George Jennings 1768-1774; Edward Eliot 1774-1775; John Pownall 1775-1776; John Peachey 1776-1780	Succeeded by Edward James Eliot; Dudley North
Political offices
Preceded by Sir Charles Cocks, Bt	Clerk of the Deliveries of the Ordnance; 1773–1778	Succeeded by Henry Strachey
Preceded by Andrew Wilkinson	Storekeeper of the Ordnance; 1778–1780	Succeeded by Henry Strachey
