= Gibbs Crawfurd =

British politician

Gibbs Crawfurd (1732 – 13 October 1793) was a British Member of Parliament and administrator.

He was the eldest son of John Crawfurd, a barrister from Ardmillan in Ayrshire. He attended Eton College in 1748 and married Anna Payne of Newick and East Grinstead on 23 December 1760, with whom he had two sons and two daughters. He succeeded his father in 1762 and took over the Saint Hill estate near East Grinstead, which his father had purchased in 1715.

Crawfurd eventually followed his father into the legal profession, joining Lincoln's Inn in 1770. He served as solicitor of stamp duties from 1771 to June 1790 and as clerk of Ordnance from April 1782 to April 1783, and from December 1783 to his death in October 1793. He owed his position at the Board of Ordnance to Charles Lennox, 3rd Duke of Richmond, the then Master-General of the Ordnance.

It was at the Duke of Richmond's behest that he was put forward for the position of Member of Parliament for the rotten borough of Queenborough in 1790. Needing only a small number of firmly controlled votes, his election was a formality; he owed his position to the Board of Ordnance's need to protect its interests in Parliament and moved the estimates for the Ordnance in February 1791. He was otherwise a 'silent' member and held the position of MP until his death.

Crawfurd was succeeded in 1793 by his son Charles, for whom he obtained the office of deputy paymaster of widows' pensions and a yearly pension of £350, as well as the inheritance of the Saint Hill estate.

Parliament of Great Britain
| Preceded by John Clater Aldridges | Member of Parliament for Queenborough; 1790–1793; With: Richard Hopkins | Succeeded by Augustus Rogers |
Political offices
| Preceded by Humphrey Minchin | Clerk of the Ordnance; 1790–1793 | Succeeded by John Sargent |
