= George Pownall =

English official and politician

Sir George Pownall

Member of the Legislative Council of Lower Canada
- In office 1792–1834

Personal details
- Born: 1755 Lincolnshire, England
- Died: 17 October 1834 (aged 78–79) Brighton, England
- Relations: John Pownall, father; Thomas Pownall, uncle

Sir George Pownall (1755 – 17 October 1834) was an English official and politician who served in Lower Canada from 1775.

Pownall was the eldest son of John Pownall of Lincolnshire, England, and his wife Mary Lillingston, daughter of Bowden Lillingston of Ferriby, Yorkshire. His father was in government office and was under-secretary of state at the American department Pownall was appointed secretary and registrar of the province of Quebec in 1775. He arrived in Quebec on 15 June 1776 and was appointed to the Council for the Affairs of the Province of Quebec in 1775 and to the Legislative Council of Lower Canada in 1792.

Pownall later became provost marshal general of the Leeward Islands. He was made a Knight of the Order of the Bath on 6 April 1796 .

Pownall died unmarried at Brighton on 17 October 1834.
