= St Germans (constituency) =

Former rotten borough in Cornwall, England

- Former borough constituency for the House of Commons

1562–1832
- Seats: Two
- Replaced by: East Cornwall

St Germans was a rotten borough in Cornwall which returned two Members of Parliament to the House of Commons in the English and later British Parliament from 1562 to 1832, when it was abolished by the Great Reform Act.

== History ==
The borough consisted of part of St Germans parish in South-East Cornwall, a coastal town too small to have a mayor and corporation, where the chief economic activity was fishing. Like most of the Cornish boroughs enfranchised or re-enfranchised during the Tudor period, it was a rotten borough from the start.

The right to vote rested in theory with all (adult male) householders, but in practice only a handful (who called themselves freemen) exercised the right; there were only seven voters in 1831. The Eliot family had exercised complete control over the choice of MPs for many years, as was also true at nearby Liskeard.

In 1831, the borough had a population of 672, and 99 houses. The boundaries excluded part of the town, which consisted of 124 houses in total, but this was still far too small to justify its retaining its representation, and St Germans was disfranchised by the Reform Act in 1832. The decision, however, was controversial: the whole parish (of which the town made up only a fraction) had a population in the 1821 census of 2,404, and the initial proposal was that St Germans should lose only one of its two MPs. But the borough covered only 40 acres (160,000 m^{2}), and the town 50, in a parish of more than 9,000 acres (36 km^{2}). The Whig government decided that the availability in a surrounding parish of sufficient population should not save a borough from disfranchisement, unless a substantial part of that population was already within the borough boundaries. The bill's schedules were amended so as to extinguish both of the St Germans MPs, saving instead the second MP at Penryn (where the boundaries had been extended to take in the neighbouring town of Falmouth). The Tory opposition attacked the decision as politically motivated (St Germans was a Tory borough), and the vote in the Commons was one of the narrowest in the entire reform bill debates.

== Members of Parliament ==
=== MPs 1563–1629 ===
Parliament	First member	Second member
Parliament of 1563–1567	William Mohun	William Hyde
Parliament of 1571	Charles Glemham	Thomas Cosgrave
Parliament of 1572–1581	Thomas Ayshe	Richard Eliot
Parliament of 1584–1585	George Carew	Henry Denny
Parliament of 1586–1587	Thomas Bodley	Edward Barker
Parliament of 1588–1589	William Barrington	William Langham
Parliament of 1593	Sampson Lennard	John Glanville
Parliament of 1597–1598	Robert Hatchman	John Chamberlain
Parliament of 1601	(Sir) George Carew	John Osborne
Parliament of 1604–1611	(Sir) George Carew	John Trott
Addled Parliament (1614)	Sir John Eliot	John Trott
Parliament of 1621–1622	Richard Tisdale	Sir Richard Buller
Happy Parliament (1624–1625)	(Sir) John Coke	Sir John Stradling
Useless Parliament (1625)	(Sir) John Coke	Sir Henry Marten
Parliament of 1625–1626	Sir John Eliot	Sir Henry Marten
Parliament of 1628–1629	Thomas Cotton	Benjamin Valentine
No Parliament summoned 1629–1640

=== MPs 1640–1832 ===
Year	First member	First party	Second member	Second party
April 1640	William Scawen		John Eliot	
November 1640	Benjamin Valentine	Parliamentarian	John Moyle	Parliamentarian
December 1648	Benjamin Valentine	Parliamentarian	Moyle excluded in Pride's Purge – seat vacant	
1652	Valentine died 1652 – seat vacant		Moyle excluded in Pride's Purge – seat vacant	
1653	St Germans was unrepresented in the Barebones Parliament and the First and Second Parliaments of the Protectorate			
January 1659	John Glanville		John St Aubyn	
May 1659	Not represented in the restored Rump			
1660	John Eliot		Richard Knightley	
1661	John Eliot		Edward Eliot	
1679	Daniel Eliot		Richard Eliot	
1685	Daniel Eliot		Sir Thomas Higgons	
1689	Daniel Eliot		Sir Walter Moyle	
1690	Daniel Eliot		Henry Fleming	
1698	Daniel Eliot		John Tanner	
1700	Daniel Eliot		Henry Fleming	
January 1701	John Speccot		Henry Fleming	
April 1701	Daniel Eliot		Henry Fleming	
December 1701	Richard Edgcumbe	Whig	Henry Fleming	
1702	John Anstis		Henry Fleming	
May 1705	Samuel Rolle		Henry Fleming	
December 1705	Edward Eliot		Henry Fleming	
1708	Edward Eliot		Francis Scobell	Tory
1710	Edward Eliot		John Knight	Whig
January 1715	Waller Bacon		John Knight	Whig
May 1715	Lord Stanhope	Whig	John Knight	Whig
1722	Lord Binning		Philip Cavendish	
1727	Sir Gilbert Heathcote	Whig	Sidney Godolphin	
January 1733	Sir Gilbert Heathcote	Whig	Richard Eliot	
March 1733	Dudley Ryder		Richard Eliot	
1734	The Lord Baltimore		Charles Montagu	
1741	John Hynde Cotton		James Newsham	
1747	Richard Eliot		Thomas Potter	
1748	Edward Eliot	Whig	Thomas Potter	
1754	Edward Eliot	Whig	Anthony Champion	
1761	Edward Eliot	Whig	Philip Stanhope	
1765	Edward Eliot	Whig	William Hussey	
March 1768	Edward Eliot	Whig	Samuel Salt	
December 1768	George Jennings		Benjamin Langlois	
1774	Edward Eliot	Whig	Benjamin Langlois	
1775	John Pownall		Benjamin Langlois	
1776	John Peachey		Benjamin Langlois	
1780	Edward James Eliot		Dudley Long	Whig
1784	John Hamilton	Tory	Abel Smith	
1788	John Hamilton	Tory	Samuel Smith	
February 1790	Sir Charles Hamilton		Samuel Smith	
June 1790	The Marquess of Lorne	Whig	Hon. Edward James Eliot	
1791	The Marquess of Lorne	Whig	Hon. William Eliot	Tory
1796	Lord Grey	Whig	Hon. William Eliot	Tory
1802	Lord Binning	Tory	James Langham	
1806	Sir Joseph Yorke	Tory	Matthew Montagu	Tory
1810	Charles Philip Yorke	Tory	Matthew Montagu	Tory
1812	William Henry Pringle	Tory	Henry Goulburn	Tory
1818	Hon. Seymour Thomas Bathurst	Tory	Charles Arbuthnot	Tory
1826	Charles Ross	Tory	Charles Arbuthnot	Tory
1827	Charles Ross	Tory	James Loch	Whig
July 1830	Charles Ross	Tory	Sir Henry Hardinge	Tory
December 1830	Charles Ross	Tory	Winthrop Mackworth Praed	Tory
1832	Constituency abolished			
