= Richard Hopkins (died 1799) =

English politician

Richard Hopkins (1728?–1799), of Oving, Buckinghamshire, was an English politician.

He was the eldest son of Edward Hopkins of Coventry, whom he succeeded in 1736, and was educated at Lincoln's Inn (1739) and Queens' College, Cambridge (1746).

He was a member of parliament (MP) for Dartmouth on 7 February 1766 – 1780 and 1784–1790; for Thetford in 1780–1784; for Queenborough in 1790–1796; and for Harwich in 1796 – 19 March 1799.

He was a Clerk of the Green Cloth (1767–1777), a Lord of the Admiralty (1782–1783 and 1784–1791) and a Lord of the Treasury (1791–1797).

He died unmarried on 18 March 1799 and was buried in the Parish Church of St. Michael, Coventry, as were his parents and paternal grandparents. The church contained plaques commemorating these family members, and flat stones marked their burial places. As Coventry Cathedral, the church was destroyed during World War II.

Parliament of Great Britain
| Preceded by John Jeffreys; Hon. Richard Howe | Member of Parliament for Dartmouth; 1766–1780; With: Hon. Richard Howe | Succeeded by Hon. Richard Howe; Arthur Holdsworth |
| Preceded by Hon. Charles FitzRoy; Charles FitzRoy-Scudamore | Member of Parliament for Thetford; 1780–1784; With: Charles FitzRoy-Scudamore to 1782; Earl of Euston 1782–84 | Succeeded by George Jennings; Sir Charles Kent, Bt |
| Preceded by George Bowyer; John Clater Aldridge | Member of Parliament for Queenborough; 1784–1796; With: Gibbs Crawfurd 1790–93; Augustus Rogers 1793–94; John Sargent | Succeeded by John Sargent; Evan Nepean |
| Preceded by Thomas Orde; John Robinson | Member of Parliament for Harwich; 1796–1799; With: John Robinson | Succeeded by Henry Dillon-Lee; John Robinson |
