= James Craggs the Younger =

English Whig politician (1686–1721)

The Right Honourable James Craggs
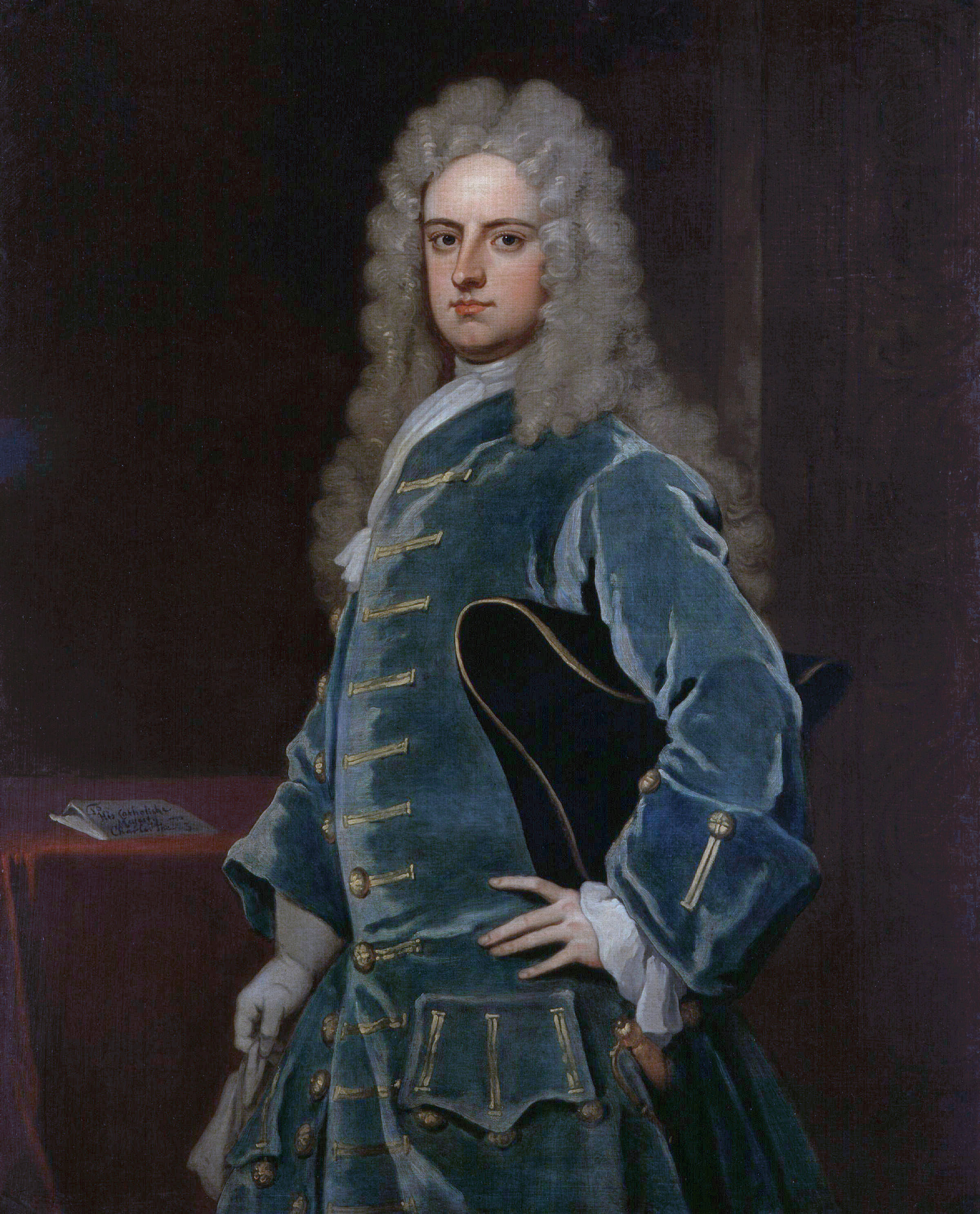
- Portrait by Sir Godfrey Kneller, c. 1708

Secretary at War
- In office 1717–1718
- Preceded by: William Pulteney
- Succeeded by: The Viscount Castlecomer

Secretary of State for the Southern Department
- In office 1718–1721
- Preceded by: Joseph Addison
- Succeeded by: The Lord Carteret

Personal details
- Born: 9 April 1686
- Died: 16 February 1721 (aged 34)

James Craggs the Younger PC (9 April 1686 – 16 February 1721), was an English Whig politician. He was briefly the British envoy to Spain in 1711. Craggs received influential appointments in government following the Hanoverian succession, serving as both Secretary at War and Secretary of State for the Southern Department before his premature death in 1721. Craggs had a colourful private life and was involved in several extramarital affairs, scandals and duels.

== Early life ==
Craggs was born at Westminster, the second but eldest surviving son of James Craggs the Elder. He was educated at Monsieur le Fevre’s school in Chelsea, London. In 1703 he was sent to Turin with his father's friend, Richard Hill of Hawkstone, where he "degenerated into waywardness and extravagance". By September 1704, Craggs had been sent home in disgrace.

In early 1706, Craggs was trusted to undertake another educational trip and traveled to the Low Countries and Germany. He spent time in Hanover where he became embroiled in a disagreement with the British envoy, Emanuel Howe, possibly as a result of Craggs forming a brief intimate relationship with Sophia von Kielmansegg. Nonetheless, through this relationship Craggs was introduced to George Louis, Elector of Hanover.

In April 1708 Craggs was appointed secretary to the British envoy in Spain, James Stanhope, eventually becoming Stanhope's deputy. In March 1711, Craggs was briefly appointed full envoy to Spain, but was not in favour with the Tory Harley ministry in London; he was soon replaced by John Campbell, 2nd Duke of Argyll. In March 1711 he fought a duel with a Captain Montagu following an argument at a theatre. In November 1711, he lost permanently the favour of his father's patron, Sarah Churchill, Duchess of Marlborough, having been accused of the rape of one of her servants while staying with the Duchess in St Albans.

== Political career ==
In April 1713 Craggs contested a by-election for Tregony, but was defeated. He was, however, returned as a member of parliament for the seat at the 1713 British general election. He was recorded in two subsequent lists of the house as a Whig.

He became a leading figure of the Hannover Club and participated in the publication and distribution of Whig propaganda, such as Richard Steele's The Crisis in early 1714. Craggs' willingness to speak during debates on the most significant political issues helped to establish his position as a leading figure in the parliamentary party. In the Commons, he gave speeches in favour of the Hanoverian succession and accused the Tory government of Jacobitism in a debate on 15 April 1714.

On 31 July 1714, Craggs was entrusted by the Privy Council of Great Britain to travel to Hanover and inform Elector George of Queen Anne's imminent demise. By the time Craggs arrived on 4/5 August, the Queen was dead. Craggs was rewarded for his service to the Hanoverians by being appointed cofferer to the Prince of Wales.

In April 1717 he was brought into government as Secretary at War and in the following year Secretary of State for the Southern Department. In government, Craggs was generally well regarded, with Arthur Onslow commenting that he acted "with a sufficinecy that amazed those who knew him". On 17 March 1718, he was sworn of the Privy Council and 1719 he was made one of the Lords Justices. Craggs was implicated in the South Sea Bubble, but not so deeply as his father. In early 1721, his name began to feature in a Commons' investigation into the procurement of stock for the king's mistress, Melusine von der Schulenburg, Duchess of Kendal. However, Craggs contracted small pox and died on 16 February 1721, aged 34, before he could be formally implicated.

== Personal life ==
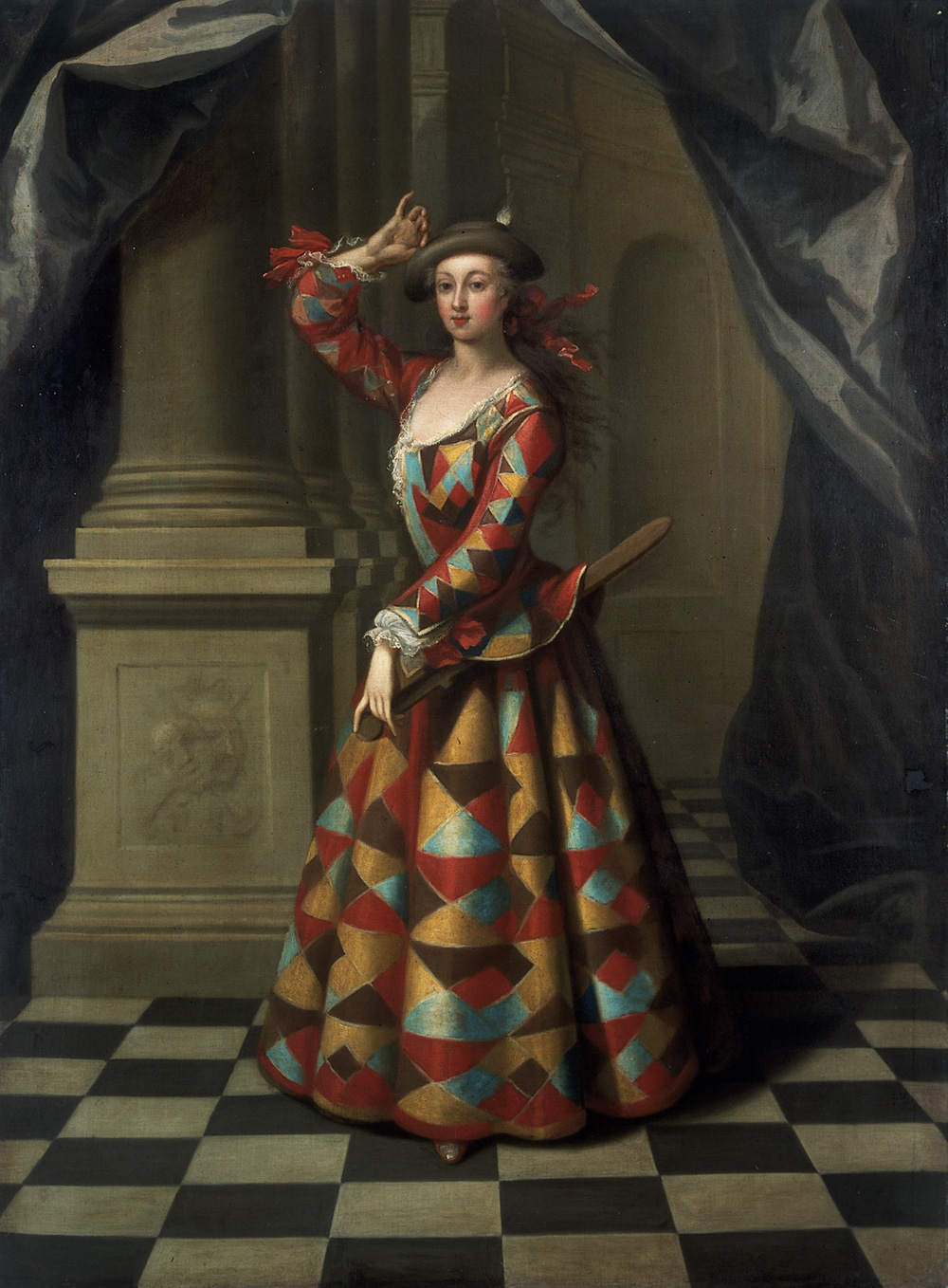
Craggs had an intimate relationship with the famous ballerina, Hester Santlow, with whom he had an illegitimate daughter

James Craggs left an illegitimate daughter, Harriot Craggs, by the noted dancer and actress Hester Santlow. Harriot was probably born in February 1713 and she was married firstly in 1726 to Richard Eliot, having nine children including Edward Craggs-Eliot, 1st Baron Eliot and secondly in 1749 to John Hamilton by whom she had a son.

James Craggs also left two illegitimate sons, each named James, by different mothers; reference to these may be found in the will of his uncle, Michael Richards, who left bequests to Harriot and to each of the sons. One of the sons died at sea in 1740 as a lieutenant in the Royal Navy under the name James Smith, but noted as being the natural son of the late Secretary Craggs.

In 1719 he was one of the original backers of the Royal Academy of Music, establishing a London opera company which commissioned numerous works from Handel, Bononcini and others. Among Craggs's friends were Alexander Pope (who wrote the epitaph on his monument in Westminster Abbey), Joseph Addison and John Gay.

Parliament of Great Britain
Preceded by Edward Southwell; George Robinson	Member of Parliament for Tregony; 1713–1721; With: Sir Edmund Prideaux, Bt 1713–1720; Charles Talbot 1720–1721	Succeeded by Charles Talbot; Daniel Pulteney
Political offices
Preceded by William Pulteney	Secretary at War; 1717–1718	Succeeded by The Viscount Castlecomer
Preceded by Joseph Addison	Secretary of State for the Southern Department; 1718–1721	Succeeded by The Lord Carteret
