= James Newsham =

English politician (1715–1769)

James Newsham of Chadshunt, Warwickshire (18 October [O.S. 7 October] 1715 – November 1769) was an British politician. He sat as MP for St Germans from 1741 till 1747 and St Mawes from 10 December 1754 till 1761.

He was the oldest son of John Newsham of Chadshunt by his second wife. He was educated privately under David Mallet. He went on a Grand Tour in 1735. He died unmarried. He succeeded to estates at Chadshunt in 1724, to the Kentish property of his mother in 1756, and to the property of his aunt Elizabeth Eliot in 1765.
