= Anthony Champion =

English poet and politician (1725 – 1801)

Anthony Champion (5 February 1725 – 22 February 1801) was an English lawyer and politician. A volume of his poetry and other writings was published after his death.

== Life ==
Champion was the son of Peter Champion, and his wife Catherine. Peter Champion, a merchant, was a member of a family long resident in the parish of St Columb in Cornwall. Anthony was born in Croydon in 1725; he was first educated at Cheam School, then in 1739 was sent to Eton College, where he was captain of the oppidans in 1742. He matriculated at St Mary Hall, Oxford on 28 February 1742/3, where his tutor was Walter Harte. After two years he left without taking his degree, and entered as a student at the Middle Temple. He became a bencher of the Inn in 1779 and a reader in 1785, and continued to reside within its precincts until his death.

He was twice returned to parliament for a Cornish borough, on both occasions through the influence of the Eliot family. His first constituency was St. Germans (22 April 1754), the second was Liskeard (30 March 1761). In the House of Commons he sat, like Edward Gibbon, who also represented the latter constituency, a mute observer of the scene, and although he dabbled in poetry, his writings remained unpublished until after his death.

Champion died on 22 February 1801 at the Middle Temple, and was buried at Temple Church. He was unmarried, and his bequests totalled more than £30,000. He left £1,000 to the Middle Temple; to his lifelong friend William Henry, Lord Lyttelton he left £5,000 and his large collection of books and papers. In 1801 Lord Lyttelton published Miscellanies in verse and prose, English and Latin, by the late Anthony Champion.
