= List of MPs elected in the 1774 British general election =

1774–1780 Parliament of Great Britain
←	1768–1774 Parliament	1780–1784 Parliament	→

Overview
- Legislative body: Parliament of Great Britain
- Meeting place: Palace of Westminster
- Term: 30 November 1774 – 8 July 1780
- Election: 1774 British general election
- Government: North ministry

House of Commons
- Members: 558
- Speaker: The Lord Grantley
- Leader: The Lord North

House of Lords
- Lord Chancellor: The Earl Bathurst
- Leader: The Earl of Suffolk

Crown-in-Parliament King George III

Sessions
- 1st: 30 November 1774 – 26 May 1775
- 2nd: 26 October 1775 – 23 May 1776
- 3rd: 31 October 1776 – 6 June 1777
- 4th: 18 November 1777 – 3 June 1778
- 5th: 28 November 1778 – 3 July 1779
- 6th: 25 November 1779 – 8 July 1780

List of MPs elected in the 1774 British general election

12th Parliament	(1761)
13th Parliament	(1768)
14th Parliament	(1774)
15th Parliament	(1780)
16th Parliament	(1784)

This is a list of the 558 MPs or members of Parliament elected to the 314 constituencies of the Parliament of Great Britain in 1774, the 14th Parliament of Great Britain and their replacements returned at subsequent by-elections, arranged by constituency.

Table of contents:

A B C D E F G H I J K L M N O P Q R S T U V W X Y Z By-elections Changes

== A ==
Aberdeen Burghs (seat 1/1)	Thomas Lyon – resigned Replaced by Adam Drummond 1779	Pro-Admin Whig
Aberdeenshire (seat 1/1)	Alexander Garden	Independent
Abingdon (seat 1/1)	John Mayor – void election, re-elected 1775	
Aldborough (seat 1/2)	Charles Wilkinson – became insane Replaced by William Baker 1777	
Aldborough (seat 2/2)	Abel Smith –- resigned Replaced by Hon. William Hanger 1778	Whig.
Aldeburgh (seat 1/2)	Thomas Fonnereau –- died Replaced by Martyn Fonnereau 1779	
Aldeburgh (seat 2/2)	Richard Combe	
Amersham (seat1/2)	William Drake, Jr.	Tory
Amersham (seat 2/2)	William Drake, Sr.	Tory
Andover (seat 1/2)	Benjamin Lethieullier	
Andover (seat 2/2)	Sir John Griffin	
Anglesey (seat 1/1)	The Viscount Bulkeley	
Anstruther Easter Burghs (seat 1/1)	Philip Anstruther II – resigned Replaced by Hon. George Damer 1778	
Appleby (seat 1/2)	George Johnstone	
Appleby (seat 2/2)	Philip Honywood	
Argyllshire (seat 1/1)	Adam Livingston	
Arundel (seat 1/2)	Thomas Brand	
Arundel (seat 2/2)	George Newnham	
Ashburton (seat 1/2)	Robert Palk	
Ashburton (seat 2/2)	Charles Boone	
Aylesbury (seat 1/2)	Anthony Bacon	
Aylesbury (seat 2/2)	John Aubrey	
Ayr Burghs (seat 1/1)	Sir George Macartney – took post Replaced by Frederick Stuart 1776	
Ayrshire (seat 1/1)	Sir Adam Fergusson	
== B ==
Banbury (seat 1/1)	Frederick North, Lord North	Tory
Banffshire (seat 1/1)	James Duff	
Barnstaple (seat 1/2)	William Devaynes	
Barnstaple (seat 2/2)	John Clevland	Whig
Bath (seat 1/2)	Abel Moysey	
Bath (seat 2/2)	John Smith – died replaced by Sir John Sebright, 6th Baronet 1775	
Beaumaris (seat 1/1)	Sir Hugh Williams, 8th Baronet	
Bedford (seat 1/2)	Sir William Wake, 8th Baronet	
Bedford (seat 2/2)	Robert Sparrow – unseated on petition Replaced by Samuel Whitbread 1775	
Bedfordshire (seat 1/2)	John FitzPatrick, 2nd Earl of Upper Ossory	Whig
Bedfordshire (seat 2/2)	Robert Ongley	Tory
Bere Alston (seat 1/2)	Sir Francis Drake, 5th Baronet	
Bere Alston (seat 2/2)	Hon. George Hobart	
Berkshire (seat 1/2)	Christopher Griffith – died replaced by Winchcombe Henry Hartley 1776	
Berkshire (seat 2/2)	John Elwes	
Berwickshire (seat 1/1)	James Pringle – resigned replaced by Sir John Paterson, Bt 1779	
Berwick-upon-Tweed (seat 1/2)	Jacob Wilkinson	
Berwick-upon-Tweed (seat 2/2)	Hon. John Vaughan	
Beverley (seat 1/2)	George Tufnell	
Beverley (seat 2/2)	Sir James Pennyman, Bt	
Bewdley (seat 1/1)	William Henry Lyttelton	
Bishops Castle (seat 1/2)	George Clive – died replaced by William Clive 1779	
Bishops Castle (seat 2/2)	Henry Strachey – took office Replaced by Alexander Wedderburn 1778 – took office Replaced by Henry Strachey1780	
Bletchingley (seat 1/2)	Frederick Standert	
Bletchingley (seat 2/2)	Sir Robert Clayton	
Bodmin (seat 1/2)	James Laroche	
Bodmin (seat 2/2)	George Hunt	
Boroughbridge (seat 1/2)	Anthony Eyre	
Boroughbridge (seat 2/2)	Charles Mellish – sat for Pontefract. Replaced by William Phillips, 1775	
Bossiney (seat 1/2)	John Stuart, Lord Mountstuart – ennobled Replaced by Hon. Charles Stuart	
Bossiney (seat 2/2)	Henry Lawes Luttrell	
Boston (seat 1/2)	Lord Robert Bertie	
Boston (seat 2/2)	Charles Amcotts – died Replaced by Humphrey Sibthorp 1777	
Brackley (seat 1/2)	William Egerton	
Brackley (seat 2/2)	Timothy Caswall	
Bramber (seat 1/2)	Thomas Thoroton	
Bramber (seat 2/2)	Sir Henry Gough	
Brecon (seat 1/1)	Charles Van – died Replaced by Charles Gould, 1778	
Breconshire (seat 1/1)	Charles Morgan	
Bridgnorth (seat 1/2)	The Lord Pigot – died Replaced by Hugh Pigot 1778	
Bridgnorth (seat 2/2)	Thomas Whitmore	
Bridgwater (seat 1/2)	Hon. Anne Poulett	
Bridgwater (seat 2/2)	Benjamin Allen	
Bridport (seat 1/2)	Lucius Ferdinand Cary	
Bridport (seat 2/2)	Thomas Coventry	
Bristol (seat 1/2)	Henry Cruger	
Bristol (seat 2/2)	Edmund Burke	
Buckingham (seat 1/2)	Richard Grenville	Grenvillite
Buckingham (seat 2/2)	James Grenville	Grenvillite
Buckinghamshire (seat 1/2)	Ralph Verney, Earl Verney	
Buckinghamshire (seat 2/2)	George Grenville – succeeded to peerage Replaced by Thomas Grenville 1779	
Bury St Edmunds (seat 1/2)	Sir Charles Davers, Bt	
Bury St Edmunds (seat 2/2)	Augustus John Hervey – succeeded to peerage Replaced by Henry Seymour Conway 1775	
Buteshire (seat 1/1)	James Stuart II	
== C ==
Caernarvon Boroughs (seat 1/1)	Glyn Wynn	
Caernarvonshire (seat 1/1)	Thomas Assheton Smith	
Caithness (seat 0/0)	Alternating seat with Bute-shire. No representation in 1774	
Callington (seat 1/2)	John Dyke Acland – died Replaced by George Stratton 1778	
Callington (seat 2/2)	William Skrine	
Calne (seat 1/2)	John Dunning	
Calne (seat 2/2)	Isaac Barré	
Cambridge (seat 1/2)	Soame Jenyns	
Cambridge (seat 2/2)	Charles Sloane Cadogan – ennobled Replaced by Benjamin Keene	
Cambridgeshire (seat 1/2)	Sir Sampson Gideon, Bt	
Cambridgeshire (seat 2/2)	Sir John Hynde Cotton, Bt	
Cambridge University (seat 1/2)	Richard Croftes	
Cambridge University (seat 2/2)	Charles Manners, Marquess of Granby – succeeded to peerage Replaced by James Mansfield, 1779	
Camelford (seat 1/2)	John Amyand	
Camelford (seat 2/2)	Francis Herne – died Replaced by Sir Ralph Payne 1776	
Canterbury (seat 1/2)	Richard Milles	
Canterbury (seat 2/2)	Sir William Mayne	
Cardiff Boroughs (seat 1/1)	Herbert Mackworth	
Cardigan Boroughs (seat 1/1)	Sir Robert Smyth, Bt – unseated on petition Replaced by Thomas Johnes, 1775 – resigned Replaced by John Campbell 1780	
Cardiganshire (seat 1/1)	Viscount Lisburne	
Carlisle (seat 1/2)	Fletcher Norton – sat for Guildford; Replaced by Walter Spencer-Stanhope	
Carlisle (seat 2/2)	Anthony Morris Storer	
Carmarthen (seat 1/1)	John Adams	
Carmarthenshire (seat 1/1)	George Rice – died replaced by John Vaughan 1779	
Castle Rising (seat 1/2)	Alexander Wedderburn – sat for Okehampton; Replaced by Hon. Charles Finch 1775 – resigned Replaced by John Chetwynd Talbot 1777	
Castle Rising (seat 2/2)	Robert Mackreth	
Cheshire (seat 1/2)	John Crewe	Whig
Cheshire (seat 2/2)	Samuel Egerton – died Replaced by Sir Robert Salusbury Cotton, Bt, 1779	
Chester (seat 1/2)	Richard Wilbraham-Bootle	
Chester (seat 2/2)	Thomas Grosvenor	
Chichester (seat 1/2)	William Keppel	
Chichester (seat 2/2)	Thomas Conolly	
Chippenham (seat 1/2)	Sir Edward Bayntun-Rolt	
Chippenham (seat 2/2)	Samuel Marsh	
Chipping Wycombe (seat 1/2)	Hon. Thomas Fitzmaurice	
Chipping Wycombe (seat 2/2)	Robert Waller	
Christchurch (seat 1/2)	Thomas Villiers, Lord Hyde	
Christchurch (seat 2/2)	James Harris	Whig
Cirencester (seat 1/2)	James Whitshed	
Cirencester (seat 2/2)	Samuel Blackwell	
Clackmannanshire (seat 1/1)	Ralph Abercromby	
Clitheroe (seat 1/2)	Thomas Lister	
Clitheroe (seat 2/2)	Assheton Curzon	
Cockermouth (seat 1/2)	George Johnstone, RN – sat for Appleby; Replaced by Ralph Gowland 1775	
Cockermouth (seat 2/2)	Fletcher Norton – sat for Guildford; Replaced by James Adair 1775	
Colchester (seat 1/2)	Charles Gray	Tory
Colchester (seat 2/2)	Isaac Martin Rebow	Whig
Corfe Castle (seat 1/2)	John Bond	
Corfe Castle (seat 2/2)	John Jenkinson	
Cornwall (seat 1/2)	Sir John Molesworth, Bt – died Replaced by Edward Eliot 1775	
Cornwall (seat 2/2)	Sir William Lemon, Bt	
Coventry (seat 1/2)	Edward Roe Yeo	
Coventry (seat 2/2)	Walter Waring – died replaced by John Baker Holroyd, 1780	
Cricklade (seat 1/2)	William Earle – died replaced by Samuel Peach 1775 – void election double return Replaced by John Dewar 1776	
Cricklade (seat 2/2)	Arnold Nesbitt – died replaced by John Macpherson 1779	
Cromartyshire (seat 1/1)	William Pulteney	
Cumberland (seat 1/2)	Henry Fletcher	
Cumberland (seat 2/2)	James Lowther, 1st Earl of Lonsdale	
== D ==
Dartmouth (seat 1/2)	Richard Hopkins	
Dartmouth (seat 2/2)	Richard Howe, Viscount Howe	
Denbigh Boroughs (seat 1/1)	Richard Myddelton	
Denbighshire (seat 1/1)	Sir Watkin Williams-Wynn, 4th Baronet	
Derby (seat 1/2)	Lord Frederick Cavendish	
Derby (seat 2/2)	Wenman Coke – sat for Norfolk; Replaced by John Gisborne 1775 – unseated on petition Replaced by Daniel Coke 1776	
Derbyshire (seat 1/2)	Lord George Cavendish	Whig
Derbyshire (seat 2/2)	Godfrey Bagnall Clarke –- died Replaced by Hon. Nathaniel Curzon 1775	Tory;
Devizes (seat 1/2)	James Sutton	
Devizes (seat 2/2)	Charles Garth	
Devon (seat 1/2)	John Parker	
Devon (seat 2/2)	Sir Richard Bampfylde, Bt – died Replaced by John Rolle Walter 1776 – died Replaced by John Rolle 1780	
Dorchester (seat 1/2)	John Damer	
Dorchester (seat 2/2)	William Ewer	
Dorset (seat 1/2)	Humphrey Sturt	
Dorset (seat 2/2)	Hon. George Pitt	
Dover (seat 1/2)	John Henniker	
Dover (seat 2/2)	John Trevanion	
Downton (seat 1/2)	Thomas Duncombe – unseated on petition Replaced by John Cooper 1775 – died Replaced by Thomas Duncombe 1779 – died Replaced by Hon. Bartholomew Bouverie 1779 – unseated on petition Replaced by Robert Shafto 1780	
Downton (seat 2/2)	Thomas Dummer – unseated on petition Replaced by Sir Philip Hales 1775	
Droitwich (seat 1/2)	Thomas Foley junior – succeeded to peerage Replaced by Sir Edward Winnington, Bt 1777	
Droitwich (seat 2/2)	Andrew Foley	
Dumfries Burghs (seat 1/1)	William Douglas	
Dumfriesshire (seat 1/1)	Robert Laurie	
Dunbartonshire (seat 1/1)	Sir Archibald Edmonstone, 1st Baronet	Tory
Dunwich (seat 1/2)	Miles Barne – resigned Replaced by Barne Barne 1777	
Dunwich (seat 2/2)	Gerard Vanneck	
Durham (City of) (seat 1/2)	John Tempest	
Durham (City of) (seat 2/2)	John Lambton	
Durham (County) (seat 1/2)	Sir Thomas Clavering, 7th Baronet	
Durham (County) (seat 2/2)	Sir John Eden, Bt	
Dysart Burghs (seat 1/1)	John Johnstone	
== E ==
East Grinstead (seat 1/2)	Lord George Germain	
East Grinstead (seat 2/2)	John Irwin	
East Looe (seat 1/2)	Sir Charles Whitworth – resigned Replaced by Thomas Graves 1775 – resigned Replaced by William Graves 1775	
East Looe (seat 2/2)	John Buller	
East Retford (seat 1/2)	Sir Cecil Wray, 13th Baronet	
East Retford (seat 2/2)	Lord Thomas Pelham-Clinton – sat for Westminster; Replaced by William Hanger 1775 – resigned Replaced by Lord John Pelham-Clinton 1778	
Edinburgh (seat 1/1)	Sir Lawrence Dundas	Pro-Admin Whig
Edinburghshire (seat 1/1)	Henry Dundas	
Elgin Burghs (seat 1/1)	Staats Long Morris	
Elginshire (seat 1/1)	Arthur Duff – resigned Replaced by Lord William Gordon 1779	
Essex (seat 1/2)	John Luther	
Essex (seat 2/2)	John Conyers – died Replaced by William Harvey 1775 – died Replaced by Thomas Berney Bramston 1779	
Evesham (seat 1/2)	Henry Seymour	
Evesham (seat 2/2)	John Rushout	
Exeter (seat 1/2)	Sir Charles Warwick Bampfylde	
Exeter (seat 2/2)	John Rolle Walter – resigned Replaced by John Baring 1776	
Eye (seat 1/2)	Richard Burton Phillipson	
Eye (seat 2/2)	John St John	
== F ==
Fife (seat 1/1)	John Scott – died Replaced by James Townsend Oswald 1776 – took office Replaced by Robert Skene 1779 – unseated on petition Replaced by John Henderson 1780	
Flint Boroughs (seat 1/1)	Sir John Glynne, Bt – died Replaced by Watkin Williams 1777	
Flintshire (seat 1/1)	Sir Roger Mostyn, Bt	
Forfarshire (seat 1/1)	William Maule, Earl Panmure	
Fowey (seat 1/2)	Philip Rashleigh	
Fowey (seat 2/2)	Molyneaux Shuldham	
== G ==
Gatton (seat 1/2)	Sir William Mayne – sat for Canterbury; Replaced by Robert Mayne 1774	
Gatton (seat 2/2)	Robert Scott – sat for Wootton Bassett; Replaced by William Adam 1774	
Glamorganshire (seat 1/1)	George Venables-Vernon	
Glasgow Burghs (seat 1/1)	Lord Frederick Campbell	
Gloucester (seat 1/2)	George Augustus Selwyn	
Gloucester (seat 2/2)	Charles Barrow	
Gloucestershire (seat 1/2)	Edward Southwell – succeeded to peerage Replaced by William Bromley-Chester 1776	
Gloucestershire (seat 2/2)	Sir William Guise, Bt	
Grampound (seat 1/2)	Hon. Sir Joseph Yorke	
Grampound (seat 2/2)	Richard Neville	
Grantham (seat 1/2)	Sir Brownlow Cust – ennobled Replaced by Peregrine Cust 1776	
Grantham (seat 2/2)	Lord George Manners-Sutton	
Great Bedwyn (seat 1/2)	James Stopforth – resigned Replaced by Viscount Cranborne 1774	
Great Bedwyn (seat 2/2)	Paul Methuen	
Great Grimsby (seat 1/2)	Francis Evelyn Anderson	
Great Grimsby (seat 2/2)	Joseph Mellish	
Great Marlow (seat 1/2)	William Clayton	
Great Marlow (seat 2/2)	Sir John Borlase Warren	
Great Yarmouth (seat 1/2)	Charles Townshend	
Great Yarmouth (seat 2/2)	Hon. Richard Walpole	
Guildford (seat 1/2)	Sir Fletcher Norton	
Guildford (seat 2/2)	George Onslow	
== H ==
Haddington Burghs (seat 1/1)	John Maitland – died Replaced by Francis Charteris, 1780	
Haddingtonshire (seat 1/1)	Sir George Suttie, Bt – resigned Replaced by William Hamilton Nisbet 1777	
Hampshire (seat 1/2)	Sir Henry St John, Bt	
Hampshire (seat 2/2)	Sir Simeon Stuart, Bt – died Replaced by Jervoise Clarke Jervoise 1779	
Harwich (seat 1/2)	Edward Harvey – died Replaced by George Augustus North, 1778	
Harwich (seat 2/2)	John Robinson	
Haslemere (seat 1/2)	Thomas More Molyneux -died Replaced by Peter Burrell 1776	
Haslemere (seat 2/2)	Sir Merrick Burrell, Bt	
Hastings (seat 1/2)	Henry Temple, Lord Palmerston	
Hastings (seat 2/2)	Charles Jenkinson	
Haverfordwest (seat 1/1)	William Edwardes	
Hedon (seat 1/2)	Sir Charles Saunders – died Replaced by Hon. Lewis Watson 1776	
Hedon (seat 2/2)	Beilby Thompson	
Helston (seat 1/2)	Marquis of Carmarthen – unseated on petition Replaced by Francis Cockayne-Cust 1775	
Helston (seat 2/2)	Francis Owen – unseated on petition Replaced by Philip Yorke 1775	
Hereford (seat 1/2)	Richard Symons	
Hereford (seat 2/2)	John Scudamore	
Herefordshire (seat 1/2)	Thomas Foley snr – ennobled Replaced by Thomas Harley 1776	
Herefordshire (seat 2/2)	Sir George Cornewall, Bt	
Hertford (seat 1/2)	John Calvert	
Hertford (seat 2/2)	Paul Feilde	
Hertfordshire (seat 1/2)	William Plumer	
Hertfordshire (seat 2/2)	Thomas Halsey	
Heytesbury (seat 1/2)	William Ashe-à Court	
Heytesbury (seat 2/2)	Hon. William Gordon	
Higham Ferrers (seat 1/1)	Frederick Montagu	
Hindon (seat 1/2)	Richard Smith – void election, writ suspended 1775 – Reelected 1776	
Hindon (seat 2/2)	Thomas Brand Hollis – void election, writ suspended 1775; Replaced by Henry Dawkins 1776	
Honiton (seat 1/2)	Sir George Yonge, Bt	
Honiton (seat 2/2)	Laurence Cox	
Horsham (seat 1/2)	Jeremiah Dyson -died Replaced by Earl of Drogheda 1775	
Horsham (seat 2/2)	James Wallace	
Huntingdon (seat 1/2)	George Wombwell	
Huntingdon (seat 2/2)	Hon. William Augustus Montagu – died Replaced by Constantine John Phipps 1776	
Huntingdonshire (seat 1/2)	Viscount Hinchingbrooke	
Huntingdonshire (seat 2/2)	The Earl Ludlow	
Hythe (seat 1/2)	Sir Charles Farnaby	
Hythe (seat 2/2)	William Evelyn	
== I ==
Ilchester (seat 1/2)	Peregrine Cust – void election Replaced by Nathaniel Webb 1775	
Ilchester (seat 2/2)	William Innes void election Replaced by Owen Salusbury Brereton	
Inverness Burghs (seat 1/1)	Sir Hector Munro	
Inverness-shire (seat 1/1)	Simon Fraser	
Ipswich (seat 1/2)	William Wollaston	
Ipswich (seat 2/2)	Thomas Staunton	
== K ==
Kent (seat 1/2)	Hon. Charles Marsham Bt	
Kent (seat 2/2)	Thomas Knight, junior	
Kincardineshire (seat 1/1)	Lord Adam Gordon	
King's Lynn (seat 1/2)	Thomas Walpole	
King's Lynn (seat 2/2)	Crisp Molineux	
Kingston upon Hull (seat 1/2)	Lord Robert Manners	
Kingston upon Hull (seat 2/2)	David Hartley	
Kinross-shire (seat 0/0)	Alternating seat with Clackmannanshire. No representation in 1774	
Kirkcudbright Stewartry (seat 1/1)	William Stewart	
Knaresborough (seat 1/2)	Robert Boyle-Walsingham	
Knaresborough (seat 2/2)	Sir Anthony Abdy, Bt – resigned Replaced by Lord George Cavendish 1775	
== L ==
Lanarkshire (seat 1/1)	Andrew Stuart	
Lancashire (seat 1/2)	Lord Stanley – succeeded to peerage Replaced by Thomas Stanley I 1776 –died Replaced by Thomas Stanley II 1780	
Lancashire (seat 2/2)	Sir Thomas Egerton	
Lancaster (seat 1/2)	Sir George Warren	
Lancaster (seat 2/2)	Lord Richard Cavendish	
Launceston (seat 1/2)	John Buller	
Launceston (seat 2/2)	Humphry Morice	
Leicester (seat 1/2)	Hon. Booth Grey	
Leicester (seat 2/2)	John Darker	
Leicestershire (seat 1/2)	Sir John Palmer, Bt	
Leicestershire (seat 2/2)	Thomas Noel – succeeded to peerage Replaced by John Peach-Hungerford 1775	
Leominster (seat 1/2)	Thomas Hill – died Replaced by Frederick Cornewall 1776	
Leominster (seat 2/2)	John Bateman, Viscount Bateman	
Lewes (seat 1/2)	Sir Thomas Miller, Bt	
Lewes (seat 2/2)	Thomas Hay	
Lichfield (seat 1/2)	Thomas Gilbert	
Lichfield (seat 2/2)	George Adams (later Anson)	
Lincoln (seat 1/2)	The Viscount Lumley	
Lincoln (seat 2/2)	Robert Vyner	
Lincolnshire (seat 1/2)	Lord Brownlow Bertie – succeeded to peerage Replaced by John Thorold 1779	
Lincolnshire (seat 2/2)	Charles Anderson-Pelham	
Linlithgow Burghs (seat 1/1)	Sir James Cockburn, Bt	
Linlithgowshire (seat 1/1)	Sir William Cunynghame	
Liskeard (seat 1/2)	Edward Gibbon	
Liskeard (seat 2/2)	Samuel Salt	
Liverpool (seat 1/2)	Sir William Meredith, Bt	
Liverpool (seat 2/2)	Richard Pennant	
London (City of) (seat 1/4)	Richard Oliver	
London (City of) (seat 2/4)	Frederick Bull	
London (City of) (seat 3/4)	John Sawbridge	
London (City of) (seat 4/4)	George Hayley	
Lostwithiel (seat 1/2)	Viscount Fairford	
Lostwithiel (seat 2/2)	Charles Brett – resigned Replaced by Thomas Potter 1776	
Ludgershall (seat 1/2)	Lord George Gordon	
Ludgershall (seat 2/2)	Peniston Lamb	
Ludlow (seat 1/2)	Viscount Villiers	
Ludlow (seat 2/2)	The Lord Clive	
Lyme Regis (seat 1/2)	Hon. Henry Fane	
Lyme Regis (seat 2/2)	Henry Fane (of Worsley) – died Replaced by Francis Fane 1777	
Lymington (seat 1/2)	Edward Morant	
Lymington (seat 2/2)	Harry Burrard – resigned Replaced by Henry Goodricke 1778	
== M ==
Maidstone (seat 1/2)	Sir Horatio Mann	
Maidstone (seat 2/2)	Lord Guernsey – succeeded to peerage Replaced by Hon. Charles Finch, 1777	
Maldon (seat 1/2)	John Strutt	Tory
Maldon (seat 2/2)	Hon. Richard Savage Nassau – died Replaced by Eliab Harvey 1780	
Malmesbury (seat 1/2)	Hon. Charles James Fox	Whig
Malmesbury (seat 2/2)	William Strahan	Tory
Malton (seat 1/2)	Savile Finch	
Malton (seat 2/2)	Edmund Burke – sat for Bristol; Replaced by William Weddell 1775	Whig
Marlborough (seat 1/2)	Sir James Long, Bt	
Marlborough (seat 2/2)	Hon. James Brudenell	
Merionethshire (seat 1/1)	Evan Lloyd Vaughan	
Middlesex (seat 1/2)	John Wilkes	Radical
Middlesex (seat 2/2)	John Glynn – died Replaced by Thomas Wood 1779	
Midhurst (seat 1/2)	Herbert Mackworth – sat for Cardiff; Replaced by Hon. Henry Seymour-Conway 1774	
Midhurst (seat 2/2)	Clement Tudway – sat for Wells; Replaced by John Ord 1774	
Milborne Port (seat 1/2)	Hon. Temple Luttrell	
Milborne Port (seat 2/2)	Captain Charles Wolseley	
Minehead (seat 1/2)	Henry Fownes Luttrell – resigned Replaced by Thomas Pownall 1774	
Minehead (seat 2/2)	John Fownes Luttrell	
Mitchell (seat 1/2)	John Stephenson	
Mitchell (seat 2/2)	James Scawen –- sat for Surrey; Replaced by Hon. Thomas Howard 1774 – succeeded to peerage Replaced by Francis Hale 1779	
Monmouth Boroughs (seat 1/1)	John Stepney	
Monmouthshire (seat 1/2)	John Morgan	
Monmouthshire (seat 2/2)	John Hanbury	
Montgomery (seat 1/1)	Whitshed Keene	
Montgomeryshire (seat 1/1)	William Mostyn Owen	
Morpeth (seat 1/2)	Francis Eyre – unseated on petition Replaced by Hon. William Byron 1775 – died Replaced by Gilbert Elliot 1776 – resigned Replaced by John William Egerton 1777	
Morpeth (seat 2/2)	Peter Delmé	
== N ==
Nairnshire (seat 1/1)	Cosmo Gordon – took office Replaced by John Campbell 1777	
Newark (seat 1/2)	George Manners-Sutton	
Newark (seat 2/2)	Henry Clinton	
Newcastle-under-Lyme (seat 1/2)	George Hay – died Replaced by George Leveson-Gower, Viscount Trentham 1779	
Newcastle-under-Lyme (seat 2/2)	George Waldegrave, Viscount Chewton	
Newcastle-upon-Tyne (seat 1/2)	Sir Walter Calverley Blackett – died Replaced by Sir John Trevelyan, Bt, 1777	
Newcastle-upon-Tyne (seat 2/2)	Sir Matthew White Ridley, Bt	
Newport (Cornwall) (seat 1/2)	Humphry Morice – sat for Launceston; Replaced by John Frederick 1775	
Newport (Cornwall) (seat 2/2)	Richard Bull	
Newport (Isle of Wight) (seat 1/2)	Sir Richard Worsley	
Newport (Isle of Wight) (seat 2/2)	Hans Sloane	
New Radnor Boroughs (seat 1/1)	John Lewis – unseated on petition Replaced by Edward Lewis 1775	
New Romney (seat 1/2)	Sir Edward Dering, Bt	
New Romney (seat 2/2)	Richard Jackson	
New Shoreham (seat 1/2)	Charles Goring	
New Shoreham (seat 2/2)	Sir John Shelley	
Newton (Lancashire) (seat 1/2)	Anthony James Keck	
Newton (Lancashire) (seat 2/2)	Robert Vernon Atherton Gwillym	
Newtown (Isle of Wight) (seat 1/2)	Sir John Barrington, Bt – resigned Replaced by Edward Meux Worsley 1775	
Newtown (Isle of Wight) (seat 2/2)	Harcourt Powell – resigned Replaced by Charles Ambler 1775	
New Windsor (seat 1/2)	Augustus Keppel	
New Windsor (seat 2/2)	John Montagu	
New Woodstock (seat 1/2)	John Skynner –- took office Replaced by Viscount Parker 1777	
New Woodstock (seat 2/2)	William Eden	
Norfolk (seat 1/2)	Sir Edward Astley, Bt	
Norfolk (seat 2/2)	Wenman Coke – died Replaced by Thomas Coke 1776	
Northallerton (seat 1/2)	Daniel Lascelles	
Northallerton (seat 2/2)	Henry Peirse (younger)	
Northampton (seat 1/2)	Sir George Robinson	
Northampton (seat 2/2)	Wilbraham Tollemache	
Northamptonshire (seat 1/2)	Lucy Knightley	
Northamptonshire (seat 2/2)	Thomas Powys	
Northumberland (seat 1/2)	Lord Algernon Percy	
Northumberland (seat 2/2)	Sir William Middleton, Bt	
Norwich (seat 1/2)	Harbord Harbord	
Norwich (seat 2/2)	Edward Bacon	
Nottingham (seat 1/2)	Colonel the Hon. (Sir) William Howe	
Nottingham (seat 2/2)	Sir Charles Sedley, Bt – died Replaced by Abel Smith 1778 – -died Replaced by Robert Smith 1779	
Nottinghamshire (seat 1/2)	Thomas Willoughby – succeeded to peerage Replaced by Lord Edward Bentinck 1775	
Nottinghamshire (seat 2/2)	Earl of Lincoln – died Replaced by Charles Medows (Charles Pierrepont) 1778	
== O ==
Okehampton (seat 1/2)	Richard Vernon	
Okehampton (seat 2/2)	Alexander Wedderburn – took office Replaced by Humphrey Minchin 1778	
Old Sarum (seat 1/2)	Pinckney Wilkinson	
Old Sarum (seat 2/2)	Thomas Pitt (the younger)	
Orford (seat 1/2)	Viscount Beauchamp	
Orford (seat 2/2)	Hon. Robert Seymour-Conway	
Orkney and Shetland (seat 1/1)	Thomas Dundas	
Oxford (seat 1/2)	Lord Robert Spencer	
Oxford (seat 2/2)	Captain the Hon. Peregrine Bertie	
Oxfordshire (seat 1/2)	Lord Charles Spencer	Whig
Oxfordshire (seat 2/2)	Viscount Wenman	
Oxford University (seat 1/2)	Francis Page	
Oxford University (seat 2/2)	Sir Roger Newdigate, Bt	
== P ==
Peeblesshire (seat 1/1)	James William Montgomery – took office Replaced by Adam Hay 1775 –- died Replaced by Sir Robert Murray-Keith, 1775	
Pembroke Boroughs (seat 1/1)	Hugh Owen [III]	Whig
Pembrokeshire (seat 1/1)	Hugh Owen	
Penryn (seat 1/2)	Sir George Osborn	
Penryn (seat 2/2)	William Chaytor	
Perth Burghs (seat 1/1)	George Dempster	
Perthshire (seat 1/1)	James Murray	
Peterborough (seat 1/2)	Richard Benyon	
Peterborough (seat 2/2)	Matthew Wyldbore	Whig
Petersfield (seat 1/2)	William Jolliffe	
Petersfield (seat 2/2)	Sir Abraham Hume	
Plymouth (seat 1/2)	The Viscount Barrington – resigned Replaced by Viscount Lewisham 1778	
Plymouth (seat 2/2)	Admiral Sir Charles Hardy – died Replaced by Sir Frederick Leman Rogers 1780	
Plympton Erle (seat 1/2)	Sir Richard Philipps, Bt – resigned Replaced by William Fullarton 1779	
Plympton Erle (seat 2/2)	Paul Henry Ourry – took office Replaced by John Durand 1775	
Pontefract (seat 1/2)	Sir John Goodricke, Bt.	
Pontefract (seat 2/2)	Charles Mellish	
Poole (seat 1/2)	Joshua Mauger	
Poole (seat 2/2)	Sir Eyre Coote	
Portsmouth (seat 1/2)	Sir Edward Hawke –- ennobled Replaced by Maurice Suckling 1776 – died Replaced by Hon. Robert Monckton 1778	
Portsmouth (seat 2/2)	Peter Taylor – died Replaced by Sir William Gordon 1777	
Preston (seat 1/2)	John Burgoyne	
Preston (seat 2/2)	Sir Harry Hoghton, Bt	
== Q ==
Queenborough (seat 1/2)	Sir Charles Frederick	
Queenborough (seat 2/2)	Sir Walter Rawlinson	
== R ==
Radnorshire (seat 1/1)	Chase Price –- died Replaced by Thomas Johnes 1777 – died Replaced by Thomas Johnes	
Reading (seat 1/2)	John Dodd	
Reading (seat 2/2)	Francis Annesley	
Reigate (seat 1/2)	Charles Cocks	
Reigate (seat 2/2)	John Yorke	
Renfrewshire (seat 1/1)	John Craufurd	
Richmond (Yorkshire) (seat 1/2)	Thomas Dundas – sat for Stirlingshire; Replaced by William Norton 1775	
Richmond (Yorkshire) (seat 2/2)	Sir Lawrence Dundas, Bt – sat for Edinburgh; Replaced by Charles Dundas 1775	
Ripon (seat 1/2)	William Aislabie	
Ripon (seat 2/2)	Charles Allanson – died Replaced by William Lawrence 1775	
Rochester (seat 1/2)	George Finch-Hatton	
Rochester (seat 2/2)	Robert Gregory	
Ross-shire (seat 1/1)	James Stuart-Mackenzie	
Roxburghshire (seat 1/1)	Sir Gilbert Elliot, Bt – died Replaced by Sir Gilbert Elliot 1777	
Rutland (seat 1/2)	Thomas Noel	
Rutland (seat 2/2)	George Bridges Brudenell	
Rye (seat 1/2)	Middleton Onslow – resigned Replaced by Hon. Thomas Onslow 1775	
Rye (seat 2/2)	Rose Fuller – died Replaced by William Dickinson 1777	
== S ==
St Albans (seat 1/2)	Richard Sutton	
St Albans (seat 2/2)	John Radcliffe	
St Germans (seat 1/2)	Edward Eliot – resigned Replaced by John Pownall 1775 – took office Replaced by John Peachey 1776	Whig.
St Germans (seat 2/2)	Benjamin Langlois	
St Ives (seat 1/2)	William Praed – void election Replaced by Thomas Wynn 1775	
St Ives (seat 2/2)	Adam Drummond – resigned Replaced by Philip Dehany 1778	
St Mawes (seat 1/2)	Viscount Clare	
St Mawes (seat 2/2)	Hugh Boscawen	
Salisbury (seat 1/2)	Viscount Folkestone – succeeded to peerage Replaced by Hon. William Henry Bouverie 1776	
Salisbury (seat 2/2)	William Hussey	
Saltash (seat 1/2)	Grey Cooper	
Saltash (seat 2/2)	Thomas Bradshaw –died Replaced by Sir Charles Whitworth 1775 – died Replaced by Henry Strachey 1778 –- resigned Replaced by Paul Wentworth	
Sandwich (seat 1/2)	Philip Stephens	
Sandwich (seat 2/2)	William Hey – took office Replaced by Charles Brett 1776	
Scarborough (seat 1/2)	Earl of Tyrconnell	
Scarborough (seat 2/2)	Sir Hugh Palliser, Bt – resigned Replaced by Charles Phipps 1779	
Seaford (seat 1/2)	William Gage, Viscount Gage	
Seaford (seat 2/2)	George Medley	
Selkirkshire (seat 1/1)	John Pringle	
Shaftesbury (seat 1/2)	Thomas Rumbold – unseated on petition seat declared vacant 1775; By-election George Rous 1776	
Shaftesbury (seat 2/2)	Francis Sykes – unseated on petition Replaced by Hans Winthrop Mortimer 1775	
Shrewsbury (seat 1/2)	Charlton Leighton – unseated on petition Replaced by William Pulteney 1775	
Shrewsbury (seat 2/2)	Robert Clive, Baron Clive – died Replaced by John Corbet 1775	Tory
Shropshire (seat 1/2)	Noel Hill	
Shropshire (seat 2/2)	Charles Baldwyn	
Somerset (seat 1/2)	Edward Phelips	
Somerset (seat 2/2)	Richard Hippisley Coxe	
Southampton (seat 1/2)	Hans Stanley – died Replaced by John Fuller 1780	
Southampton (seat 2/2)	John Fleming	
Southwark (seat 1/2)	Nathaniel Polhill	
Southwark (seat 2/2)	Henry Thrale	
Stafford (seat 1/2)	Hugo Meynell	
Stafford (seat 2/2)	Richard Whitworth	
Staffordshire (seat 1/2)	William Bagot	
Staffordshire (seat 2/2)	Sir John Wrottesley, Bt	
Stamford (seat 1/2)	Henry Cecil	
Stamford (seat 2/2)	Sir George Howard	
Steyning (seat 1/2)	Thomas Edwards-Freeman	
Steyning (seat 2/2)	Filmer Honywood	
Stirling Burghs (seat 1/1)	Archibald Campbell	
Stirlingshire (seat 1/1)	Sir Thomas Dundas	Pro-Admin Whig
Stockbridge (seat 1/2)	Captain the Hon. John Luttrell – resigned Replaced by Lieutenant the Hon. James Luttrell 1775	
Stockbridge (seat 2/2)	The Lord Irnham	
Sudbury (seat 1/2)	Thomas Fonnereau – unseated on petition Replaced by Sir Patrick Blake, 1st Baronet 1775	
Sudbury (seat 2/2)	Philip Champion Crespigny – unseated on petition Replaced by Walden Hanmer 1775	
Suffolk (seat 1/2)	Sir Charles Bunbury, Bt	
Suffolk (seat 2/2)	Rowland Holt	
Surrey (seat 1/2)	James Scawen	
Surrey (seat 2/2)	Sir Francis Vincent, Bt – died Replaced by Sir Joseph Mawbey, Bt 1775	
Sussex (seat 1/2)	Sir Thomas Wilson, Bt	
Sussex (seat 2/2)	Lord George Lennox	
Sutherland (seat 1/1)	James Wemyss	
== T ==
Tain Burghs (seat 1/1)	James Grant	
Tamworth (seat 1/2)	Thomas de Grey	
Tamworth (seat 2/2)	Edward Thurlow –- ennobled Replaced by Anthony Chamier 1778	
Taunton (seat 1/2)	Hon. Edward Stratford – unseated on petition Replaced by John Halliday 1775	
Taunton (seat 2/2)	Nathaniel Webb – unseated on petition Replaced by Alexander Popham 1775	
Tavistock (seat 1/2)	Richard Rigby	Whig
Tavistock (seat 2/2)	Hon. Richard Fitzpatrick	
Tewkesbury (seat 1/2)	Joseph Martin -– died Replaced by James Martin 1776	
Tewkesbury (seat 2/2)	Sir William Codrington, Bt	Tory
Thetford (seat 1/2)	Hon. Charles FitzRoy	
Thetford (seat 2/2)	Charles FitzRoy-Scudamore	
Thirsk (seat 1/2)	Thomas Frankland	
Thirsk (seat 2/2)	Sir Thomas Frankland, Bt	
Tiverton (seat 1/2)	Nathaniel Ryder – ennobled Replaced by John Eardley Wilmot 1776	
Tiverton (seat 2/2)	John Duntze	
Totnes (seat 1/2)	Philip Jennings	
Totnes (seat 2/2)	James Amyatt	
Tregony (seat 1/2)	Hon. George Lane Parker	
Tregony (seat 2/2)	Alexander Leith	
Truro (seat 1/2)	George Boscawen	
Truro (seat 2/2)	Bamber Gascoyne	
== W ==
Wallingford (seat 1/2)	John Cator	
Wallingford (seat 2/2)	Sir Robert Barker	
Wareham (seat 1/2)	William Gerard Hamilton	
Wareham (seat 2/2)	Christopher D'Oyly	
Warwick (seat 1/2)	Hon. Charles Greville	
Warwick (seat 2/2)	Hon. Robert Fulke Greville	
Warwickshire (seat 1/2)	Sir Charles Holte, Bt	
Warwickshire (seat 2/2)	Thomas Skipwith, Bt	
Wells (seat 1/2)	Robert Child	
Wells (seat 2/2)	Clement Tudway	
Wendover (seat 1/2)	Joseph Bullock – resigned Replaced by Thomas Dummer 1775	
Wendover (seat 2/2)	John Adams – sat for Carmarthen; Replaced by Henry Drummond 1774	
Wenlock (seat 1/2)	Henry Bridgeman	
Wenlock (seat 2/2)	George Forester	
Weobley (seat 1/2)	Sir William Lynch – resigned Replaced by Andrew Bayntun-Rolt 1789	
Weobley (seat 2/2)	John St Leger Douglas	
Westbury (seat 1/2)	Hon. Thomas Wenman	
Westbury (seat 2/2)	Nathaniel Bayly – resigned Replaced by Samuel Estwick 1779	
West Looe (seat 1/2)	Sir William James	
West Looe (seat 2/2)	Charles Ogilvie – resigned Replaced by John Rogers 1775	
Westminster (seat 1/2)	Lord Thomas Pelham-Clinton	
Westminster (seat 2/2)	Baron Warkworth (Earl Percy) – succeeded to peerage Replaced by Viscount Petersham 1776 – succeeded to peerage Replaced by Viscount Malden 1779	
Westmorland (seat 1/2)	Sir James Lowther – sat for Cumberland; Replaced by James Lowther	
Westmorland (seat 2/2)	Sir Michael le Fleming	
Weymouth and Melcombe Regis (seat 1/4)	Welbore Ellis	
Weymouth and Melcombe Regis (seat 2/4)	John Purling	
Weymouth and Melcombe Regis (seat 3/4)	William Chaffin Grove	
Weymouth and Melcombe Regis (seat 4/4)	John Tucker – resigned Replaced by Gabriel Steward 1778	
Whitchurch (seat 1/2)	The Viscount Midleton	
Whitchurch (seat 2/2)	Thomas Townshend	Whig
Wigan (seat 1/2)	George Byng	
Wigan (seat 2/2)	Beaumont Hotham – took office Replaced by John Morton 1775 -– died Replaced by Henry Simpson Bridgeman 1780	
Wigtown Burghs (seat 1/1)	William Norton – unseated on petition Replaced by Henry Watkin Dashwood 1775	
Wigtownshire (seat 1/1)	Keith Stewart	
Wilton (seat 1/2)	Henry Herbert	
Wilton (seat 2/2)	Hon. Nicholas Herbert – died Replaced by Charles Herbert 1775	
Wiltshire (seat 1/2)	Charles Penruddocke	
Wiltshire (seat 2/2)	Ambrose Goddard	
Winchelsea (seat 1/2)	Arnold Nesbitt – sat for Cricklade; Replaced by William Nedham 1775	
Winchelsea (seat 2/2)	Charles Wolfran Cornwall	
Winchester (seat 1/2)	Henry Penton	
Winchester (seat 2/2)	Lovell Stanhope	
Wootton Bassett (seat 1/2)	Hon. Henry St John	
Wootton Bassett (seat 2/2)	Robert Scott	
Worcester (seat 1/2)	John Walsh	
Worcester (seat 2/2)	Thomas Bates Rous	
Worcestershire (seat 1/2)	Edward Foley	
Worcestershire (seat 2/2)	William Dowdeswell – died Replaced by William Lygon	
== Y ==
Yarmouth (Isle of Wight) (seat 1/2)	Edward Meux Worsley – resigned Replaced by James Worsley 1775	
Yarmouth (Isle of Wight) (seat 2/2)	Jervoise Clarke – resigned Replaced by Captain Robert Kingsmill 1779	
York (seat 1/2)	Charles Turner	
York (seat 2/2)	Lord John Cavendish	
Yorkshire (seat 1/2)	Edwin Lascelles	
Yorkshire (seat 2/2)	Sir George Savile	

== By-elections ==
- List of Great Britain by-elections (1774–90)

== See also ==
- 1774 British general election
- List of parliaments of Great Britain
- Unreformed House of Commons
