= Fonnereau =

Fonnereau is a surname, and may refer to:

- Claude Fonnereau (1677–1740), a French Huguenot refugee who settled in Ipswich, England and became a prominent merchant

- Thomas Fonnereau (1699–1779), merchant and politician, son of Claude
- Zachary Philip Fonnereau (1706–1778), merchant and politician, son of Claude

- Philip Fonnereau (1739–1797), merchant and politician, son of Zachary Philip
- Martyn Fonnereau (1741–1817), merchant and Director of the Bank of England, son of Zachary Philip

- Thomas George Fonnereau (1789–1850), author and artist, grandson of Zachary Philip
