= Claude Fonnereau =

French Huguenot refugee

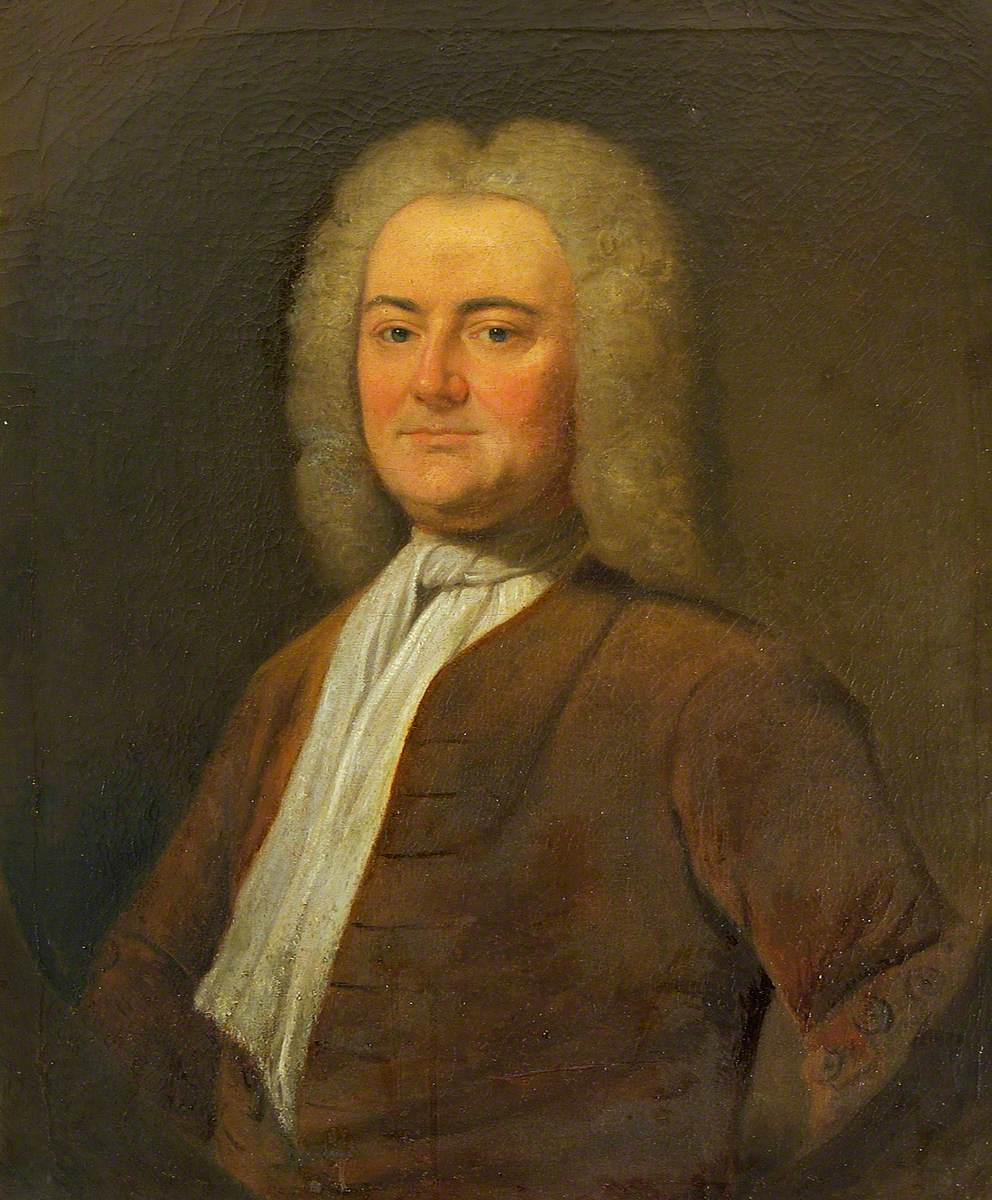
- Portrait of Fonnereau, British School, c. 1725
- Born: 22 March 1677; La Rochelle, Aunis, France
- Died: 5 April 1740 (aged 63); Hoddesdon, Hertfordshire
- Spouse: Elizabeth Bureau
- Children: Thomas Fonnereau, Zachary Philip Fonnereau
- Relatives: Sir Claude Champion de Crespigny, 1st Baronet (grandson); Philip Champion de Crespigny (grandson); Philip Fonnereau (grandson); Martyn Fonnereau (grandson)

Claude Fonnereau (22 March 1677, – 5 April 1740) was a French Huguenot refugee who settled in England and became a prominent merchant. He was the founding father of the Fonnereau family in England.

== Early life ==
Fonnereau was born on 22 March 1677 at La Rochelle. He was the son of Zacharie Fonnereau and Marguerite Chataigner.

== Career ==
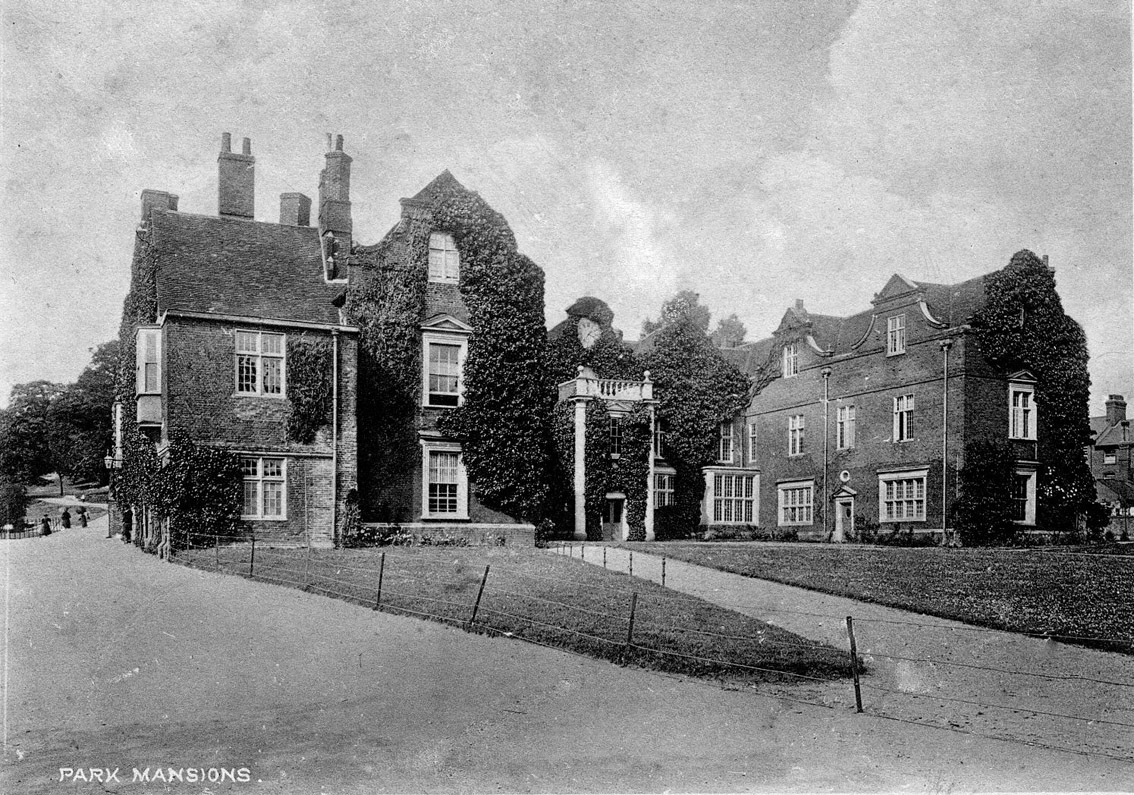
Christchurch Mansion, Ipswich c. 1890

From 1738 to 1740, he was a Director of the Bank of England.

In 1735 he purchased Christchurch Mansion in Ipswich, Suffolk, from Price Devereux, 10th Viscount Hereford.

== Personal life ==
He married Elizabeth Bureau, also a Huguenot, the daughter of Anne Bureau, and had several children:

- Thomas Fonnereau (1699–1779), a merchant and politician, who inherited his father's estates, including Christchurch Mansion.
- Claudius "Claude" Fonnereau (1701–1785), a doctor who inherited Christchurch Mansion on his elder brother's death.
- Elizabeth Frances Fonnereau (b. 1702), who married Jacques "James" Benezet, also from a Huguenot family, who had settled in London.
- Abel Fonnereau (1703–1753)
- Anne Fonnereau (b. 1704), who married Philip Champion de Crespigny, proctor of the Admiralty court, also from a Huguenot family, who had settled in Camberwell.
- Zachary Philip Fonnereau (1706–1778), a merchant and politician who married Margaret Martyn.
- Peter Fonnereau (1709–1743)
- Marie Anne Fonnereau (b. 1711), who married John Martyn.
- Elizabeth Fonnereau (b. 1712), who married Mr. De Hauteville

Fonnereau died on 5 April 1740 at Hoddesdon.

=== Descendants ===
Through his daughter Anne, he was a grandfather of Sir Claude Champion de Crespigny, 1st Baronet, and Philip Champion de Crespigny, MP for Sudbury and Aldeburgh.

Through his son Zachary, he was a grandfather of Philip Fonnereau and Martyn Fonnereau (both MPs for Aldeburgh) and great-grandfather of author and artist Thomas George Fonnereau.
