= John Martyn (botanist) =

British botanist (1699–1768)

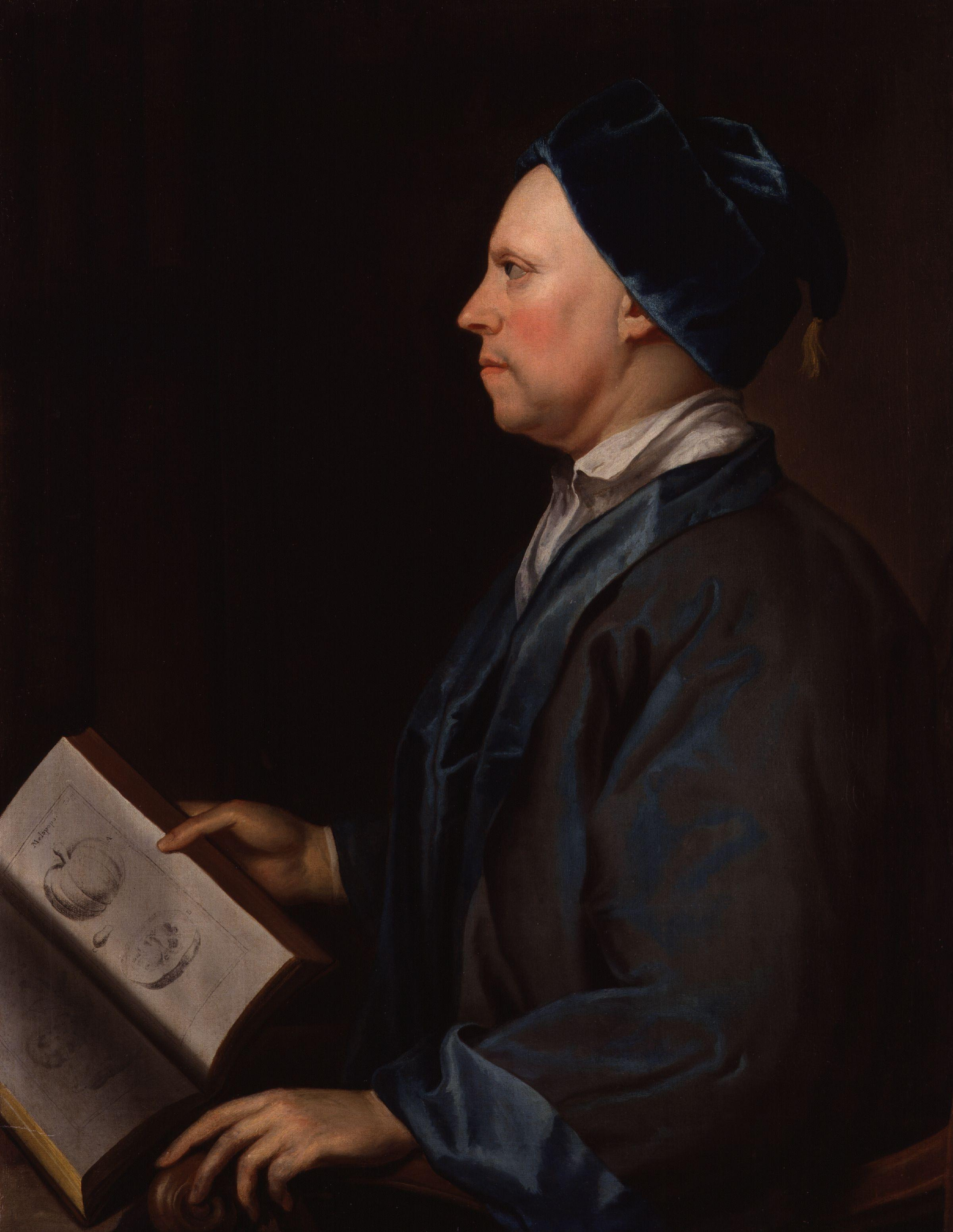
- Born: 12 September 1699; London
- Died: 29 January 1768 (aged 68); Chelsea, London
- Other name: Joannes Martyn
- Known for: Historia Plantarum Rariorum
- Spouse(s): Eulalia King, Mary Anne Fonnereau
- Children: Thomas Martyn (son)
- Relatives: John King (father-in-law), Claude Fonnereau (second father-in-law)
- Scientific career
- Fields: Botany, medicine
- Institutions: Cambridge University
- Author abbrev. (botany): J.Martyn

John Martyn or Joannes Martyn (12 September 1699 – 29 January 1768) was an English botanist.

== Career ==
Martyn was born in London, the son of a merchant. He attended a school in the vicinity of his home, and when he turned 16, worked for his father, intending to follow a business career. He married Marie Anne Fonnereau, daughter of Claude Fonnereau, a Huguenot refugee who had settled in England and become a successful merchant. Martyn abandoned his business pursuits in favour of medical and botanical studies. His interest in botany came from his acquaintance with an apothecary, John Wilmer, and Dr. Patrick Blair, a surgeon-apothecary from Dundee who practiced in London. Martyn gave some botanical lectures in London in 1721 and 1726, and in 1727 was elected a Fellow of the Royal Society of London.

Martyn was one of the founders together with Johann Jacob Dillenius and others, as well as the secretary of a botanical society which met for a few years in the Rainbow coffee-house, Watling Street. In 1732 he was appointed Professor of Botany at Cambridge University, but, finding little encouragement and hampered by a lack of equipment, he soon ceased lecturing. He retained his professorship, however, until 1768, when he resigned in favour of his son Thomas. On resigning the botanical chair at Cambridge he presented the university with a number of his botanical specimens and books.

John Martyn married Eulalia King, daughter of John King (1652–1732), rector of Pertenhall in Bedfordshire and Chelsea in London. Their son, Thomas Martyn (1735–1825) was also an eminent botanist, author of Flora rustica (1792–1794). After the death of his first wife, John Martyn married Mary Anne Fonnereau, daughter of Claude Fonnereau, merchant of London and Christchurch Mansion, Ipswich, and the brother of Thomas Fonnereau.

Although he had not taken a medical degree, he long practised as a physician at Chelsea, which is where he died in 1768.

His son Thomas wrote a memoir of his father in 1770. An expanded version of this memoir was prepared and published by George Gorham in 1830.

== Historia Plantarum Rariorum ==
Martyn is best known for his Historia Plantarum Rariorum written between 1728 and 1737 with illustrations by Jacob van Huysum. Martyn is also known for his translation, with valuable agricultural and botanical notes, of the 1749 Eclogues and the 1741 Georgics by Virgil. Editions continued to be issued after his death.

== Royal Academy of Sciences at Paris ==
With Ephraim Chambers, author of the famous Cyclopaedia, or an Universal Dictionary of Arts and Sciences, Martyn abridged and translated the Philosophical History and Memoirs of the Royal Academy of Sciences at Paris, which was published in 1742. He also started the Grub Street Journal, a weekly satirical review, which lasted from 1730 to 1737.

== Publications ==
- Martyn, John (1820) [1749]. P. Virgilii Maronis Bucolicorum eclogæ decem: The Bucolicks of Virgil, with an English translation and notes (4th ed.). London: G. and W.B. Whittaker. (see also, Bucolics)
  - 1st ed 1749
  - 2nd ed 1749
  - 1829 edition

For a full list, see Gorham p. 78

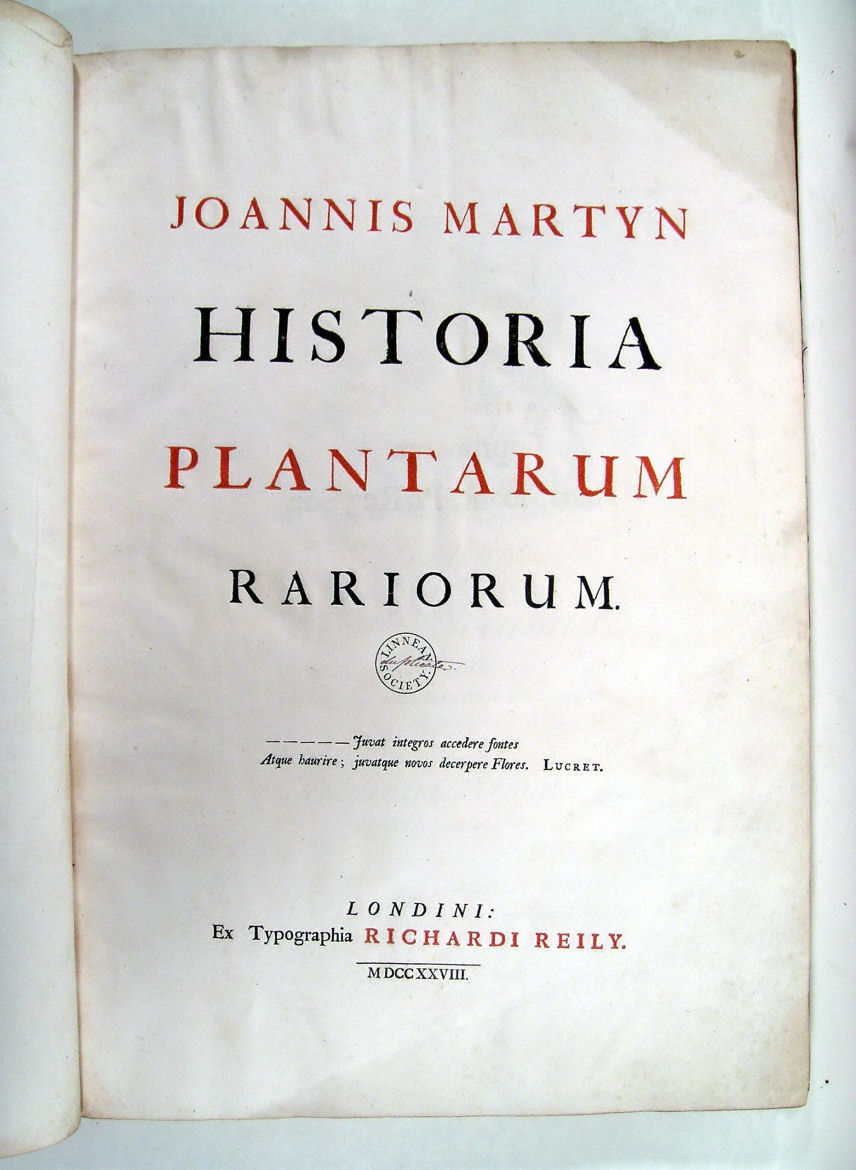

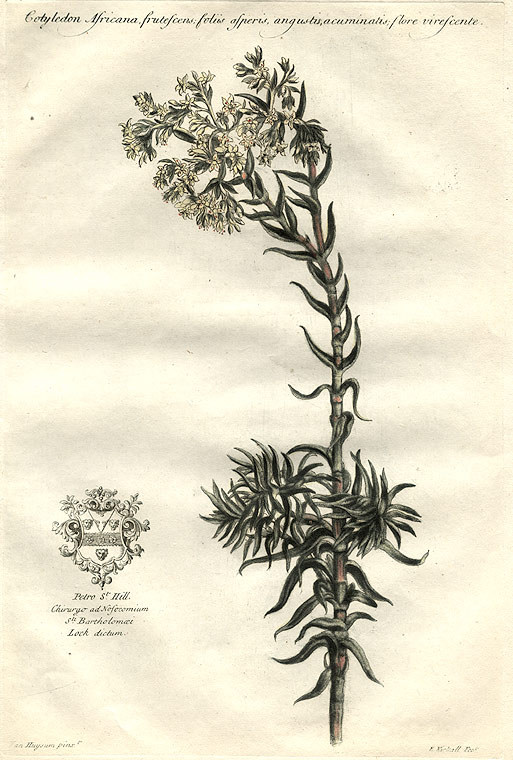
Cotyledon africana Burm.f. ex Steud.
from Historia plantarum rariorum

== Bibliography ==
- Gorham, George Cornelius (1830). Memoirs of John Martyn and of Thomas Martyn. Professors of Botany in the University of Cambridge. Hatchard and son.
