= Hanmer baronets of Hanmer (2nd creation, 1774) =

Escutcheon of the Hanmer baronets of Hanmer

The Hanmer baronetcy, of Hanmer in the County of Flint, was created in the Baronetage of Great Britain on 21 May 1774 for Walden Hanmer, Member of Parliament for Sudbury.

The 3rd Baronet represented Shrewsbury, Kingston upon Hull and Flint in Parliament. On 1 October 1872 he was raised to the Peerage of the United Kingdom as Baron Hanmer, of Hanmer, and of Flint, both in the County of Flint. The barony became extinct when he died childless on 8 March 1881 while he was succeeded in the baronetcy by his younger brother, the 4th Baronet.

The 6th Baronet was High Sheriff of Flintshire in 1902. The 8th Baronet was High Sheriff of Clwyd in 1977 and Deputy Lieutenant of the region in 1978.

== Hanmer baronets, of Hanmer (1774) ==
- Sir Walden Hanmer, 1st Baronet (1717–1783)
- Sir Thomas Hanmer, 2nd Baronet (1747–1828)
- Sir John Hanmer, 3rd Baronet (1809–1881) (created Baron Hanmer in 1872)

== Barons Hanmer (1872) ==
- John Hanmer, 1st Baron Hanmer (1809–1881)

== Hanmer baronets, of Hanmer (1774; reverted) ==
- Sir Wyndham Edward Hanmer, 4th Baronet (1810–1887)
- Sir Edward John Henry Hanmer, 5th Baronet (1843–1893)
- Sir Wyndham Charles Henry Hanmer, 6th Baronet (1867–1922)
- Sir (Griffin Wyndham) Edward Hanmer, 7th Baronet (1893–1977)
- Sir John Wyndham Edward Hanmer, 8th Baronet (1928–2008)
- Sir Wyndham Richard Guy Hanmer, 9th Baronet (born 1955)

The heir apparent is the present holder's eldest son Thomas Wyndham William Hanmer (born 1989).

== Extended family ==
Job Hanmer, second son of the 1st Baronet, was a commander in the Royal Navy; and his son Job Thomas Syer Hanmer was a captain in the Royal Navy. His son John Graham Job Hanmer was a rear-admiral in the Royal Navy; and Patrick William Talgai Hanmer, great-grandson of William Hanmer, sixth son of the 2nd Baronet, was a captain in the Royal Navy.

Harry Ivan Hanmer (1893–1984), grandson of the Rev. Henry Hanmer, brother of the 3rd and 4th Baronets, was a group captain in the Royal Air Force. John Michael Hanmer (1907–1977), another grandson of Reverend Henry Hanmer, was a brigadier in the British Army.

== Notes ==
Baronetage of Great Britain
Preceded by Edmonstone baronets	Hanmer baronets of Hanmer; 21 May 1774	Succeeded by Symons baronets
