= William Windham (of Earsham, junior) =

British landowner and politician

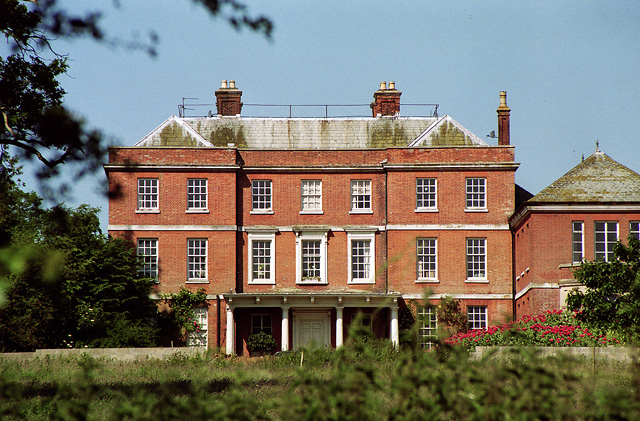
Earsham Hall

William Windham (c. 1706 – 1789) was a British landowner and politician.

The eldest son of William Windham of Earsham (died 1730) and Anne Tyrrell, he came of an old Norfolk family. He is sometimes called William Windham Ashe, a misnomer according to the History of Parliament. On his father's death he inherited Earsham Hall in Earsham, Norfolk.

He served as sub-governor to Prince William, Duke of Cumberland in 1731 and was afterwards Comptroller of the Duke's Household till the Duke's death in 1765. He was elected a Fellow of the Royal Society in 1749 although his fellowship lapsed after only two years.

He entered Parliament for the nearby borough of Aldeburgh in 1747, for which he sat until 1761. He briefly returned to Parliament for Helston from 1766 to 1768.

Upon his death in 1789, Earsham Hall went to his nephew, Joseph Wyndham-Bower. In April 1734, he had married Mary, Dowager Countess of Deloraine (d. 1744), daughter of Capt. Charles Howard and granddaughter of Col. Philip Howard, but the two had no children.

Parliament of Great Britain
Preceded by William Conolly; Richard Plumer	Member of Parliament for Aldeburgh; 1747–1761; With: Zachary Philip Fonnereau	Succeeded by Zachary Philip Fonnereau; Philip Fonnereau
Preceded by Francis Godolphin; Sir John Evelyn, Bt	Member of Parliament for Helston; 1766–1768; With: Sir John Evelyn, Bt 1766–1767; William Evelyn 1767–1768	Succeeded by William Evelyn; The Earl of Clanbrassil
