= John King (rector of Chelsea) =

John King (1 May 1652, St Columb Major, Cornwall – 30 May 1732, Chelsea, London) was an English churchman, patron of the Church of Pertenhall in Bedfordshire.

The son of John King of Manaccan, Cornwall, he matriculated at Exeter College, Oxford, as a poor scholar on 7 July 1674. He graduated BA in 1678 and proceeded MA in 1681. He took the degree of Doctor in Divinity in 1698 at St Catharine's College, Cambridge, where his friend Sir William Dawes was master. He had the curacy of Bray in Berkshire, by his second wife he acquired the patronage of Pertenhall in Bedfordshire, and was instituted in that rectory in June 1690. In 1694 he exchanged to Chelsea. in 1731 he was collated to the prebend of Wighton in York Cathedral by Sir William Dawes, now an Archbishop.

King died at Church Lane, Chelsea, on 30 May 1732, and was buried in the chancel of Pertenhall church on 13 June; a large mural monument was erected to his memory. His wife died at Chelsea on 22 June 1727, aged sixty-one, and was also buried at Pertenhall. King was survived by three sons, among them the classical scholar and physician John King (1696–1728), and three daughters, one of whom, Eulalia, was married to John Martyn (1699–1768), the botanist and author of the Historia plantarum rariorum. The patronage of Pertenhall passed from the King to the Martyn family.

The family of Dr King bears the same arms with Robert King, the first Bishop of Oxford, of whom there is a curious full-length portrait in Christ Church Cathedral, Oxford: a lion rampant crowned and three croplets or, in a field sable with the motto "Atavis Regibus"

Some of his poems and other manuscripts are among the Sloane collection in the British Museum. Additionally a manuscript survives of King's occasional observations about the parish, recorded on and off between 1694 and 1732, which has been of valuable use to local historians. Kept at the rectory until the late 19th century, it is now held by Kensington & Chelsea local studies and archives together with a typewritten transcript.

== Works ==
- Sermon on the 30th of January, being the day on which that sacred martyr, King Charles I, was murdered.
- Sermon preached at the funeral of Sir Willoughby Chamberlain, Kt. who died at his house at Chelsea, December 6 and was interred at the parish church of St. James Garlick Hith, London, December 12, 1697
- Animadversions on a pamphlet, intituled : A letter of advice to the churches of the nonconformists in the English nation, 1701
- The case of John Atherton, Bishop of Waterford in Ireland, 1711
- Tolando-Pseudologo-Mastrix, or a Curry-comb for a lying Coxcomb. Being an answer to a late piece of Mr. Toland's, called Hypatia, 1721
