= Philip Champion de Crespigny =

British lawyer and politician

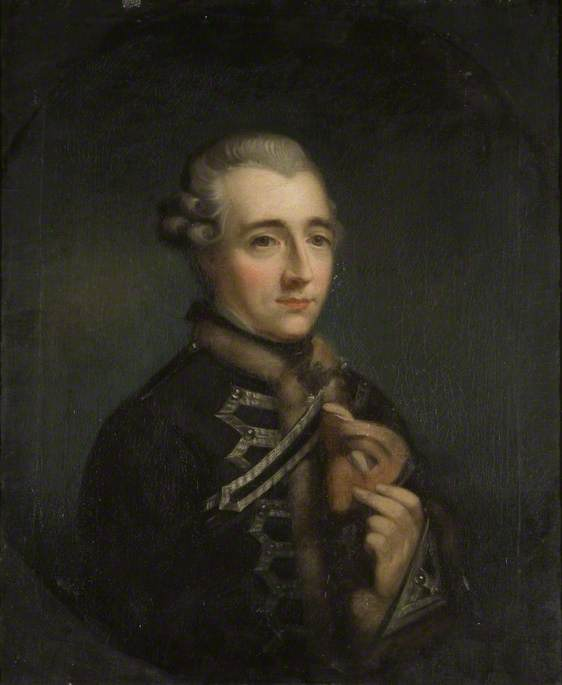
- Portrait of Champion de Crespigny by John Russell

Member of Parliament for Aldeburgh
- In office 1780–1790 Serving with Martyn Fonnereau, Samuel Salt
- Preceded by: Martyn Fonnereau; Richard Combe
- Succeeded by: Lord Grey of Groby; Thomas Grenville

Member of Parliament for Sudbury
- In office 1780–1781 Serving with (Sir) Patrick Blake
- Preceded by: (Sir) Patrick Blake (Sir) Walden Hanmer
- Succeeded by: (Sir) Patrick Blake; Sir James Marriott
- In office 1774–1775 Serving with Thomas Fonnereau
- Preceded by: (Sir) Patrick Blake (Sir) Walden Hanmer
- Succeeded by: (Sir) Patrick Blake (Sir) Walden Hanmer

Personal details
- Born: 1 April 1738 London, England
- Died: 3 January 1803 (aged 64) Bath, Somerset
- Relations: Claude Fonnereau (grandfather)
- Parent(s): Philip Champion de Crespigny; Anne Fonnereau

Philip Champion de Crespigny (1 April 1738 – 1 January 1803) was a British lawyer and politician who sat in the House of Commons between 1774 and 1790.

== Early life ==
Champion de Crespigny was born in London on 1 April 1738. He was of Huguenot descent, the son of Philip Champion de Crespigny (1704–1765), proctor of the Admiralty court, and his wife Anne Fonnereau, daughter of Claude Fonnereau of Christchurch Mansion in Ipswich, Suffolk. His elder brother Claude was made a baronet in 1805.

Crespigny was likely educated at Eton College in 1748, and was an advocate of Doctors' Commons in 1759.

== Career ==
In 1768, he became King's Proctor and held the post until 1784.

In 1774, he was elected as a Member of Parliament for Sudbury on the Fonnereau interest after a contest, but lost his seat on petition. In 1780, he was returned unopposed at Aldeburgh, also on the Fonnereau interest, as well as at Sudbury after a contest. He held both seats until 1781, when he lost Sudbury on petition, and continued to sit for Aldeburgh. The English Chronicle wrote in 1781 that “his hauteur is so distinguished, that he is generally characterised ... by the profane, though very applicable appellation, of God Almighty”. He was returned unopposed at Aldeburgh in 1784, but did not stand in the 1790 election. He was a member of the Whig club.

== Personal life ==
Champion de Crespigny was married four times and had thirteen children. His first marriage was on 24 November 1762 to Sarah Cocksedge, daughter of Thomas Cocksedge of Thetford, Norfolk and Lydia Burgess. Before her death, they were the parents of:

- Thomas c. 1763–1799), MP for Sudbury from 1790 to 1796; he married Augusta Charlotte Thellusson, a daughter of merchant Peter Thellusson and granddaughter of Genevan banker and diplomat Isaac de Thellusson.
- Philip (1765–1851)
- Jane (1766–1785)
- Anne (1768–1844) married Hugh Owen Barlow

His second marriage, in about 1771, was to Betsy Hodges, who died 1772. Together, they were the parents of a son, Charles, who died as an infant.

His third marriage was to Clarissa Sarah Brooke, daughter of James Brooke, on 1 July 1774. Before her death on 15 May 1782, they were the parents of:

- Clarissa (about 1775 – 1836) who married Edward Toker
- Maria (1776–1858), who married John Horsley in 1804.
- Harry (1777 – ?) died young
- Frances (1779–1865)

His fourth marriage was to Dorothy Scott, daughter of Richard Scott of Betton, Shropshire, on 20 February 1783. They were the parents of:

- George (1783–1813) killed in Spain
- Eliza (1784–1831), who married Hussey Vivian, 1st Baron Vivian, in 1804.
- Charles James Fox (1785–1875), who married Eliza Julia Trent in 1813.
- Dorothea (1800–1800) born and died in Bath

He died on 1 January 1803 at Bath, Somerset. His obituary in The Gentleman's Magazine described him as “very much a man of fashion in his person and demeanour, full of anecdote, and with a turn for satirical humour that rendered him a very amusing companion”. After his death, his widow married Sir John Keane, 1st Baronet in 1804.

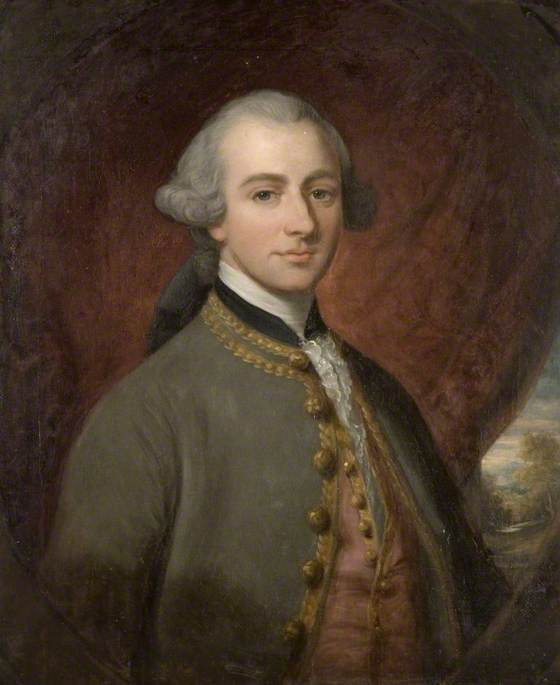
Brother, Sir Claude Champion de Crespigny, 1st Bt, painting by anonymous artist

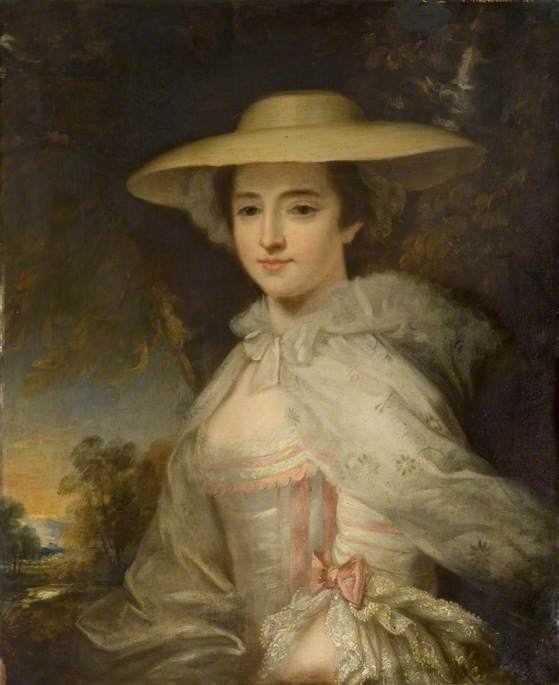
Sister, Susan Champion de Crespigny, painting by anonymous artist from the circle of George Romney

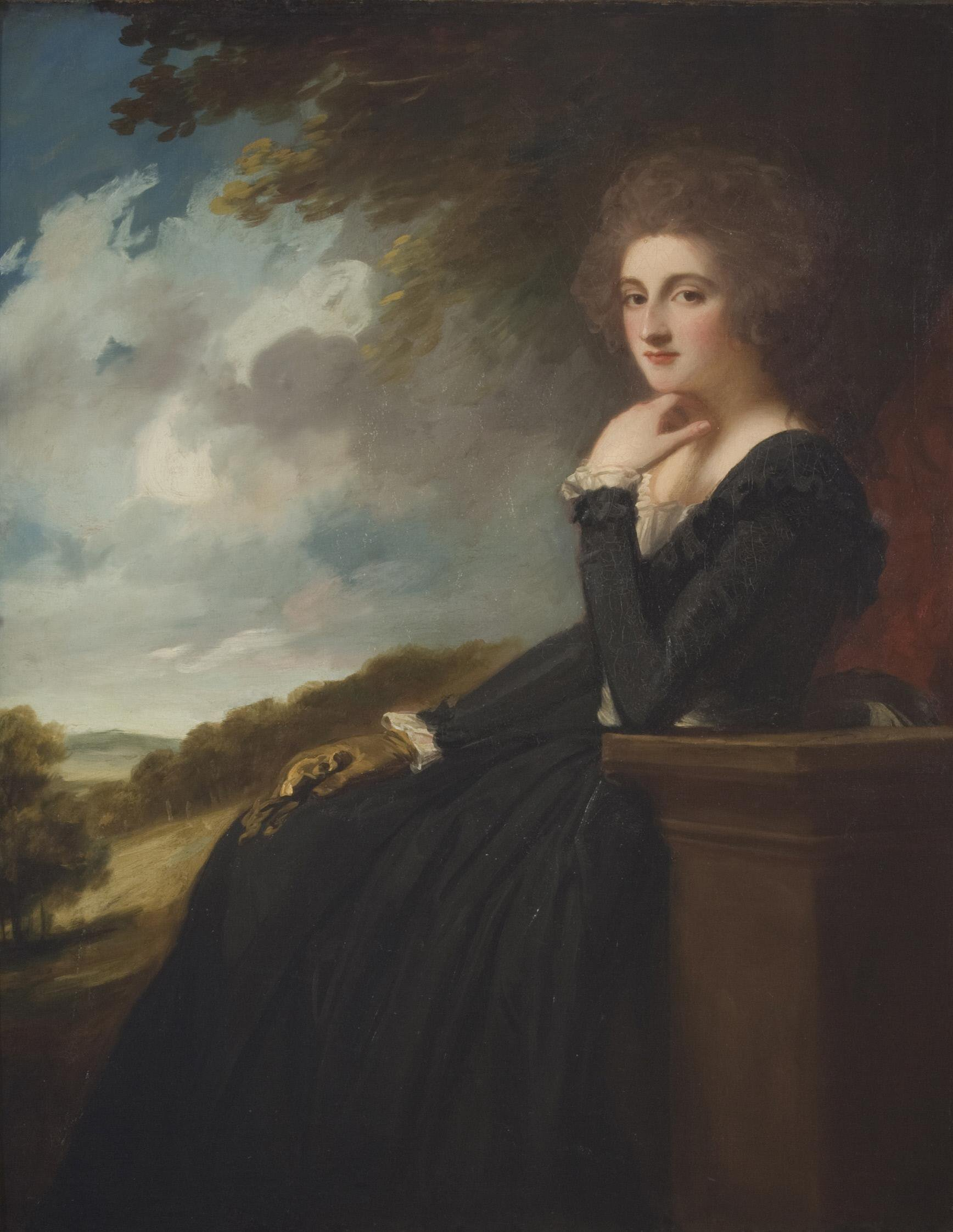
The fourth wife, Dorothy Scott, painting by George Romney, 1786–1790.

Parliament of Great Britain
Preceded by (Sir) Patrick Blake (Sir) Walden Hanmer	Member of Parliament for Sudbury; 1774–1775; With: Thomas Fonnereau	Succeeded by (Sir) Patrick Blake (Sir) Walden Hanmer
Preceded by (Sir) Patrick Blake (Sir) Walden Hanmer	Member of Parliament for Sudbury; 1780–1781; With: (Sir) Patrick Blake	Succeeded by (Sir) Patrick Blake; Sir James Marriott
Preceded by Martyn Fonnereau; Richard Combe	Member of Parliament for Aldeburgh; 1780–1790; With: Martyn Fonnereau; Samuel Salt	Succeeded by Lord Grey of Groby; Thomas Grenville
