= Zachary Philip Fonnereau =

British politician

Zachary Philip Fonnereau (31 January 1706 – 15 August 1778) was a British businessman and politician.

== Early life ==
Fonnereau was born in London on 31 January 1706, the fourth son of Claude Fonnereau of Christchurch Mansion, Ipswich, a London merchant of Huguenot extraction.

== Career ==
Fonnereau played a prominent role in financing the Seven Years' War, and served as a director of the East India Company in 1753 and 1754.

He was returned as the Member of Parliament for Aldeburgh at the 1747 election on the interest of his brother, Thomas Fonnereau, who had developed an independent interest in the borough at the expense of the Government (which had formerly controlled it by patronage). However, Zachary consistently voted in support of Government when in Parliament.

== Personal life ==
By his marriage to Margaret Martyn, he left five children, two of whom also served as Members of Parliament for Aldeburgh:

- Philip Fonnereau (1739–1797), MP for Aldeburgh from 1761 to 1768 who married Mary Parker, a daughter of Armstead Parker, MP for Peterborough.
- Martyn Fonnereau (1741–1817), MP for Aldeburgh from 1779 to 1784
- Charlotte Fonnereau (1742–1806)
- Fanny Fonnereau (1744–1827), who married George Stainforth Jr., in 1777 at Cornhill, died childless
- Thomas Fonnereau (1746–1788), who married Harriet Hanson in 1786 and left children, including the author and artist Thomas George Fonnereau

Parliament of Great Britain
| Preceded by William Conolly; Richard Plumer | Member of Parliament for Aldeburgh; 1747–1774; With: William Windham 1747–1761; Philip Fonnereau 1761–1768; Nicholas Linwood 1768–1773; Thomas Fonnereau 1773–1774 | Succeeded by Thomas Fonnereau; Richard Combe |
