= Richard Combe (MP) =

British politician

Richard Combe (?1728-1780), of Earnshill House, near Langport, Somerset, was a British politician.

== Biography ==
Combe was a member (MP) of the parliament of England for Milborne Port 7 April – 22 May 1772 (replaced on petition 1772 by George Prescott and for Aldeburgh 1774 – 1780.

== Notes ==
Parliament of Great Britain
Preceded by Earl of Catherlough; Edward Walter	Member of Parliament for Milborne Port; April–May 1772; With: Edward Walter	Succeeded by Edward Walter; George Prescott
Preceded by Thomas Fonnereau; Zachary Philip Fonnereau	Member of Parliament for Aldeburgh; 1774 – 1780; With: Thomas Fonnereau to 1779; Martyn Fonnereau from 1779	Succeeded by Martyn Fonnereau; Philip Champion Crespigny
