= Richard Symons =

British politician (c.1743–1797)

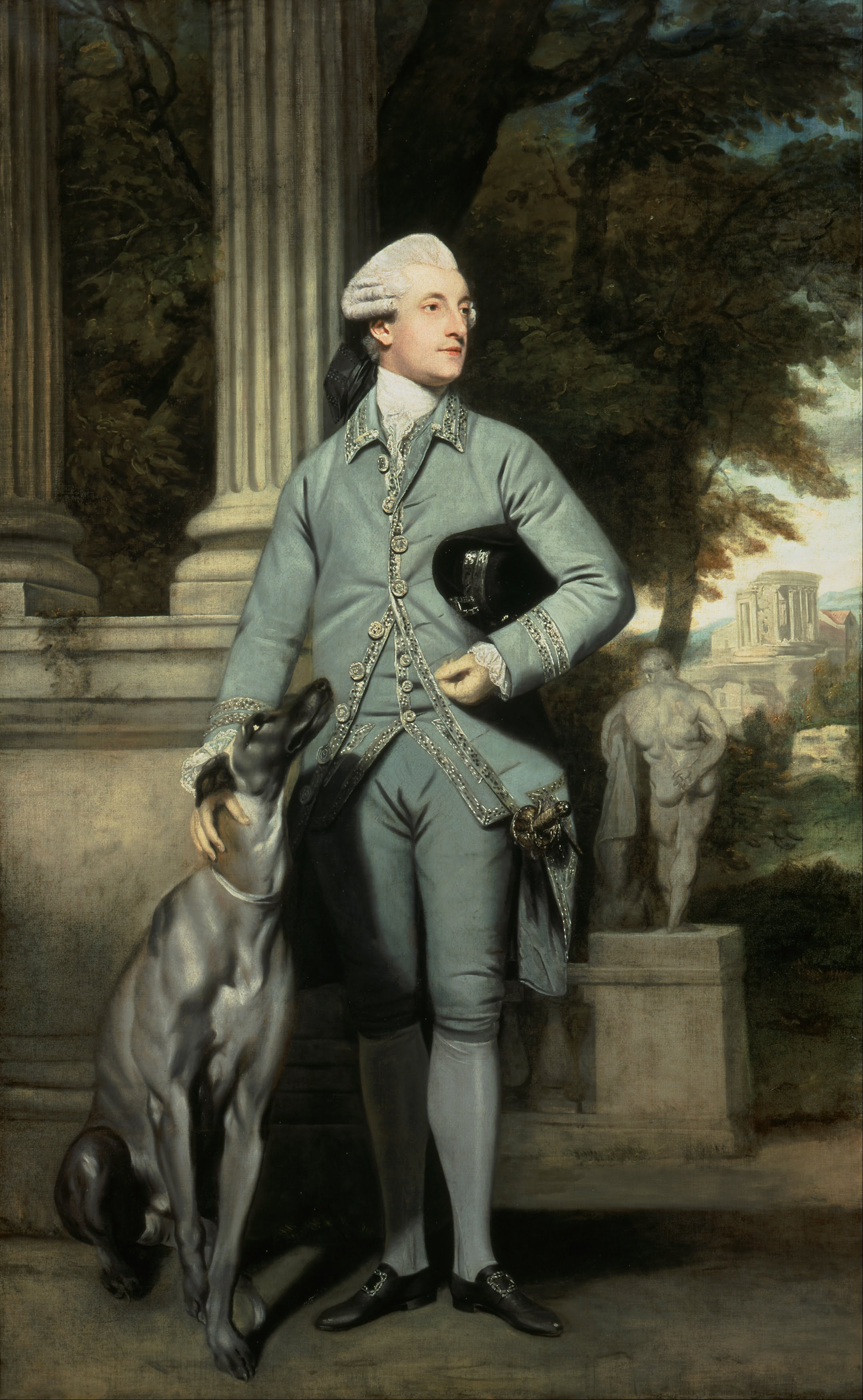
Painting by Joshua Reynolds, 1770-1771

Sir Richard Symons, 1st Baronet (c. 1743 – 4 July 1797), was a British politician.

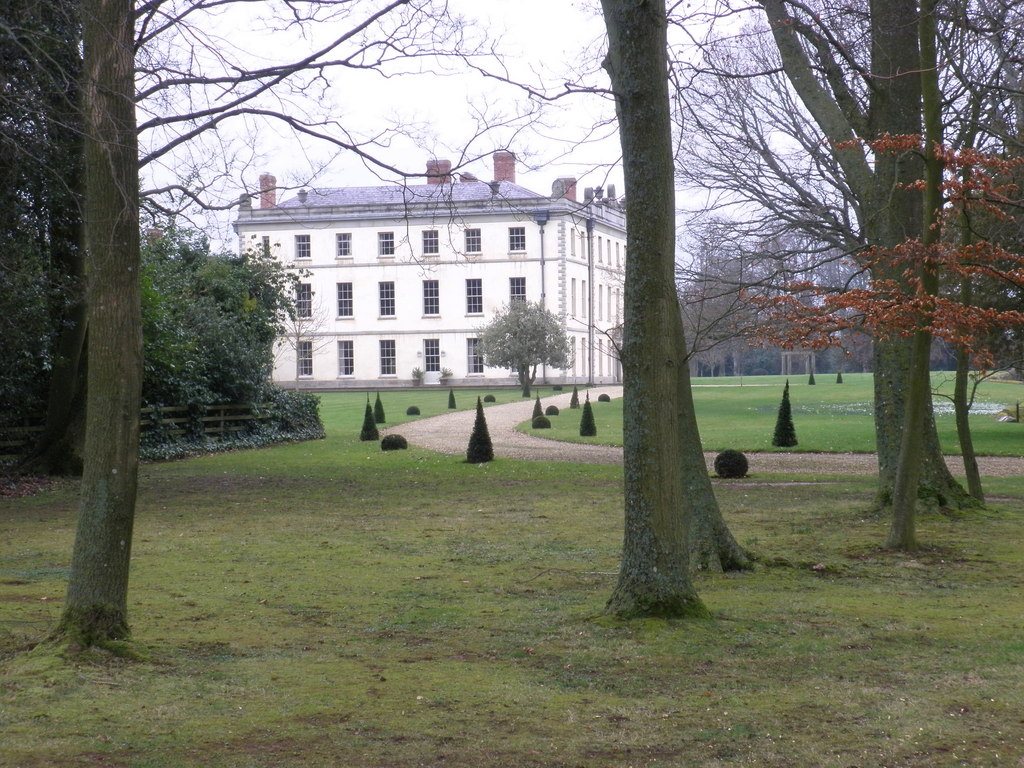
The Mynde, Herefordshire

Born Richard Peers, he was the only son of Alderman Richard Peers, of London, by Anna Sophia Symons, daughter of Richard Symons, originally of London, who had purchased The Mynde Park estate in Much Dewchurch, Herefordshire.

According to the will of his maternal grandfather, he inherited The Mynde estate in 1764 following the death of his uncle John Symons, MP for Hereford and assumed the surname of Symons in lieu of his patronymic.

From 1768 to 1784 Symons sat as Member of Parliament for Hereford. In 1774 he was created a baronet, of The Mynde in the County of Hereford.

Escutcheon of the Symons baronets of the Mynde

Symons never married. When he died in July 1797 the baronetcy became extinct. By his grandfather’s will, Mynde Park devolved to Thomas Raymond, the grandson of his grandfather's sister Ann, who also assumed the surname of Symons.

His mother and father had died in 1756 and 1772 respectively and were buried in Croydon Minster. His nephew was Charles Richard Blunt.

Parliament of Great Britain
Preceded by Charles FitzRoy-Scudamore; John Scudamore	Member of Parliament for Hereford; 1768–1784; With: John Scudamore	Succeeded by John Scudamore; Earl of Surrey
Baronetage of Great Britain
New creation	Baronet (of The Mynde); 1774–1796	Extinct
Preceded by Hanmer baronets	Symons baronets of The Mynde; 23 May 1774	Succeeded by Lemon baronets
