= Sir Patrick Blake, 1st Baronet =

British politician

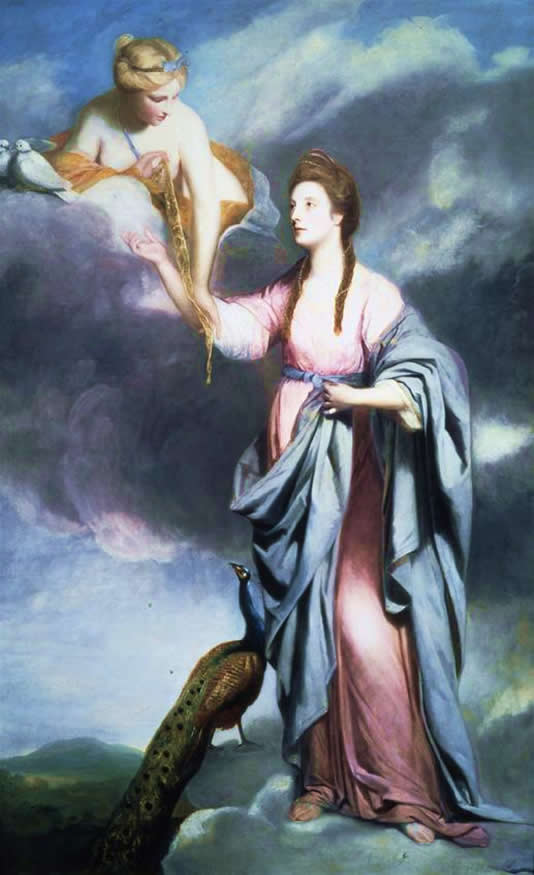
Annabella, Lady Blake, as Juno Receiving the Cestus from Venus by Joshua Reynolds, c.1769.

Sir Patrick Blake, 1st Baronet (c. 1742–1784) was a British politician who sat in the House of Commons between the year 1768 and 1784

Blake was the eldest son of Andrew Blake of St. Kitts and Montserrat and his wife Marcella French of Ireland. He succeeded to the considerable property of his grandfather Patrick Blake of St. Kitts in 1745 but later was left only a shilling by his father. He was educated at Eton College from the year 1758 to 1760 and was admitted at St. John’s College, Cambridge on 18 August 1760, aged 18. He married Annabella Bunbury, daughter of Rev. Sir William Bunbury, 5th Baronet on 14 April 1762.

In 1768, Blake was returned in a contest as Member of Parliament for Sudbury. He was created baronet on 8 October 1772. He was defeated at the 1774 general election but was returned for Sudbury on petition on 22 March 1775. In 1776, his wife Annabelle quit the marriage for France with George Boscawen and the Blakes became divorced in 1778. He topped the poll at Sudbury at the 1780 general election but did not stand in 1784.

Blake died on 1 July 1784.

Through his daughter Annabella Blake, he was the grandfather of Henry John Adeane, Member (MP) of the Parliament of the United Kingdom for Cambridgeshire.

Parliament of Great Britain
Preceded by Thomas Fonnereau; John Henniker	Member of Parliament for Sudbury; 1768–1774; With: (Sir) Walden Hanmer	Succeeded by Thomas Fonnereau; Philip Champion Crespigny
Preceded by Thomas Fonnereau; Philip Champion Crespigny	Member of Parliament for Sudbury; 1775–1784; With: Sir Walden Hanmer; Philip Champion Crespigny; Sir James Marriott	Succeeded by William Smith; John Langston
Baronetage of Great Britain
New creation	Baronet (of Langham); 1772–1784	Succeeded by Patrick Blake
