= John Henniker, 1st Baron Henniker =

British merchant and Member of Parliament

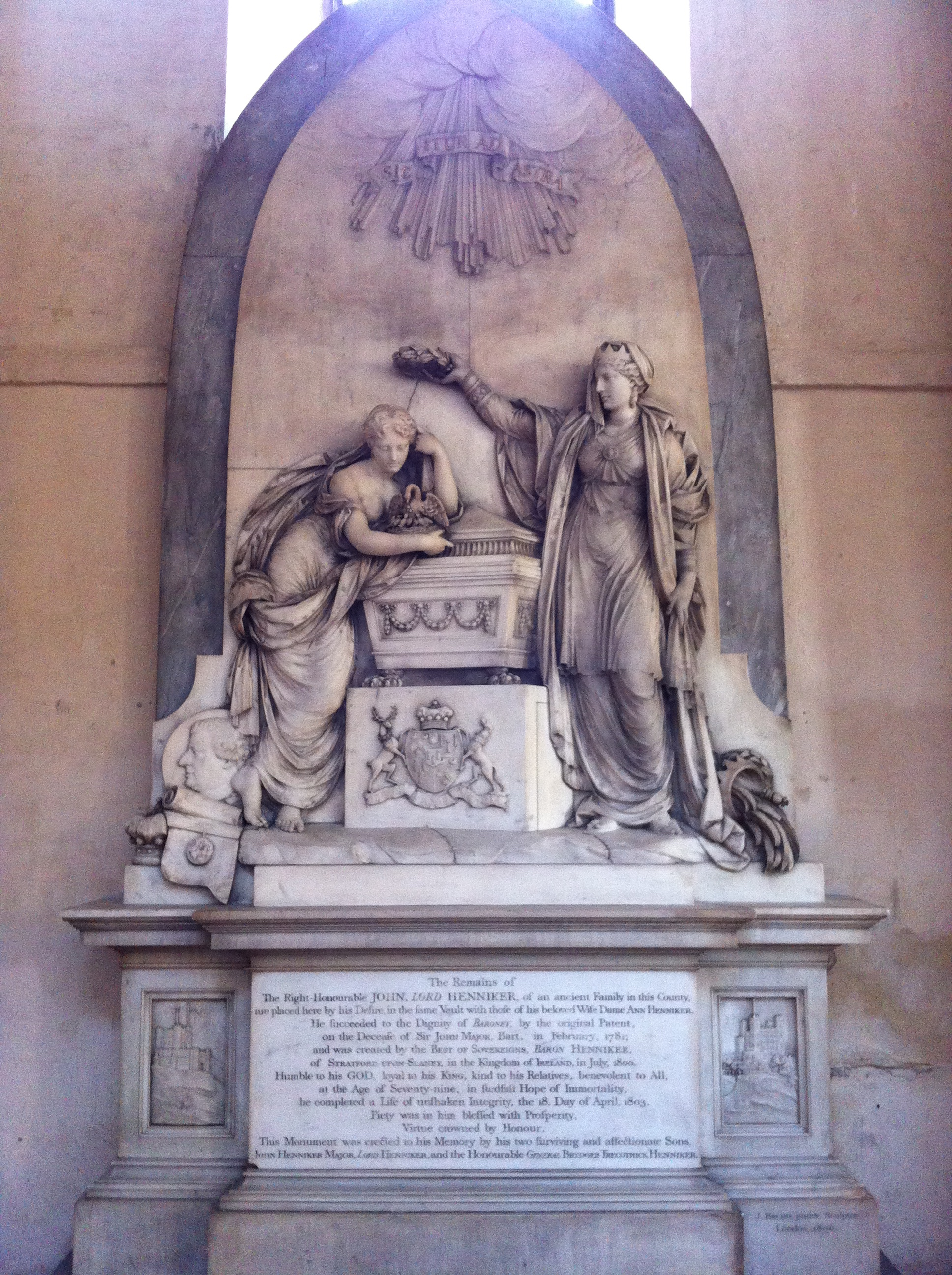
Memorial in Rochester Cathedral

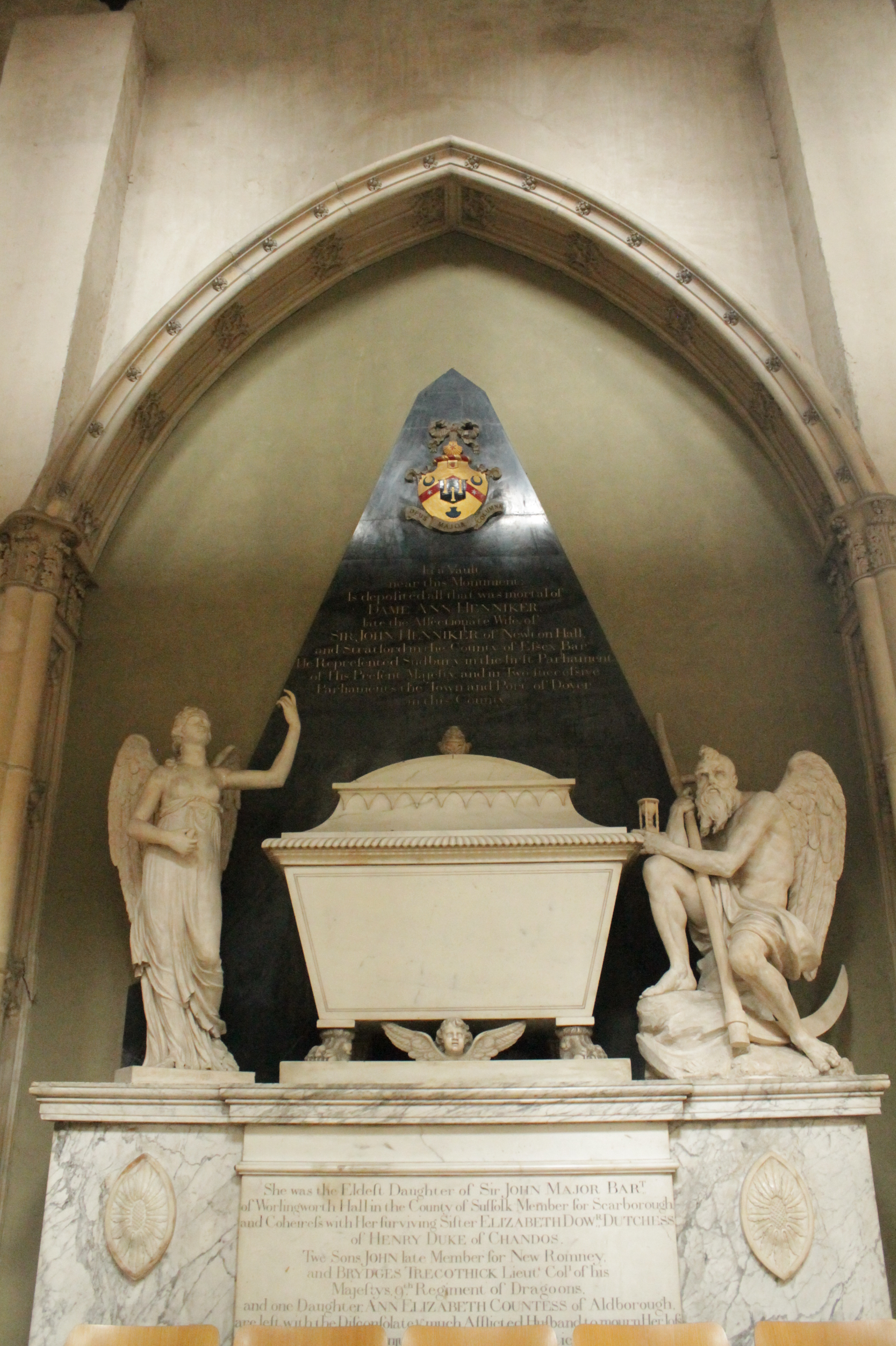
Memorial to Anne Major (Lady John Henniker), Rochester Cathedral

John Henniker, 1st Baron Henniker (15 June 1724 – 18 April 1803), known previously as John Henniker then as Sir John Henniker, 2nd Baronet, from 1782 to 1800, was a British merchant and Member of Parliament.

== Life ==
He was the son of John Henniker, of London, a Russian merchant and Freeman of Rochester.

Henniker too became a merchant dealing in leather and furs. He was a supporter of the slave trade. He was also involved in politics and was appointed High Sheriff of Essex for 1758 before being elected to the House of Commons for Sudbury in 1761, an expensive contest which needed £5,500 from the Duke of Newcastle's funds to secure his election. He held that seat until 1768, and then represented Dover from 1774 to 1784. He was elected a Fellow of the Royal Society in 1779.

He married Anne Major, daughter of Sir John Major, 1st Baronet.

In 1782, Henniker succeeded his father-in-law as second Baronet of Worlingsworth Hall according to a special remainder. In 1800 he was raised to the Peerage of Ireland as Baron Henniker, of Stratford-upon-Slaney in the County of Wicklow.

Lord Henniker died in April 1803, aged 78, and was buried in Rochester Cathedral. The very large monument is by John Bacon.

He was succeeded in his titles by his eldest son John. His youngest son, the Hon. Sir Brydges Trecothick Henniker, became a Lieutenant-General in the Army and was created a Baronet in 1813. His daughter Anne married Edward Stratford, 2nd Earl of Aldborough.

The town of Henniker, New Hampshire in the United States, was named after Lord Henniker.

== See also ==
- Henniker Baronets of Newton Hall

== Notes ==
Parliament of Great Britain
Preceded by Thomas Fonnereau; Thomas Walpole	Member of Parliament for Sudbury; 1761–1768; With: Thomas Fonnereau	Succeeded by Patrick Blake; Walden Hanmer
Preceded by Sir Joseph Yorke; Thomas Barret	Member of Parliament for Dover; 1774–1784; With: John Trevanion	Succeeded by Robert Preston; James Luttrell
Peerage of Ireland
New title	Baron Henniker; 1800–1803	Succeeded by John Henniker-Major
Baronetage of Great Britain
Preceded by John Major	Baronet (of Worlingsworth Hall); 1782–1803	Succeeded by John Henniker-Major
