= John Scudamore (1727–1796) =

John Scudamore (1727–1796), was a British politician who sat in the House of Commons for 32 years from 1764 to 1796.

Scudamore was the eldest son of Richard Scudamore of Rowlstone and his wife Joan and was baptized on 30 October 1727. He entered Lincoln's Inn in 1746. He married Sarah Westcombe, daughter and heiress of Daniel Westcombe of Enfield, on 26 August 1756. In 1761 he was Lieutenant-colonel in the Herefordshire militia.

In 1741 he succeeded to both the Rowlstone estate of his father and that of his cousin William Scudamore of Kentchurch Court.

The Scudamore family was one of the oldest in Herefordshire and had an interest both in the county and in the borough of Hereford. In a by-election in 1764, Scudamore was returned as Member of Parliament for Hereford after a contest. He was returned unopposed in all his subsequent elections to 1796.

Scudamore died on 4 July 1796 from a chill after a strenuous hunt in his park, soon after his re-election in the 1796 general election. The Gentleman's Magazine said of him “as a useful and disinterested Member of Parliament, and an active magistrate, he was deservedly respected”.

He left 2 sons and a daughter.

Parliament of Great Britain
Preceded by Charles Fitzroy Scudamore; John Symons	Member of Parliament for Hereford; 1764–1796; With: Charles Fitzroy Scudamore (Sir) Richard Symons; Earl of Surrey; Robert Philipps; James Walwyn	Succeeded by James Walwyn; John Scudamore, junior
