= Philip Fonnereau =

Philip Fonnereau (17 June 1739 – 17 February 1797) was a British merchant and banker, the eldest son of Zachary Philip Fonnereau.

He belonged to a wealthy Huguenot merchant family, and was a Director of the Bank of England. Fonnereau served as a member of parliament for the borough of Aldeburgh.

He had at least two daughters:

- Mary Anne Fonnereau (d. 1844) married George Woodford Thellusson (d. 1811), on 3 April 1791.
- Elizabeth Margaret Fonnereau married George Hibbert (1757–1837) on 30 August 1784.

Parliament of Great Britain
Preceded by William Windham; Zachary Philip Fonnereau	Member of Parliament for Aldeburgh; 1761–1768; With: Zachary Philip Fonnereau	Succeeded by Zachary Philip Fonnereau; Nicholas Linwood
