= Sir Walden Hanmer, 1st Baronet =

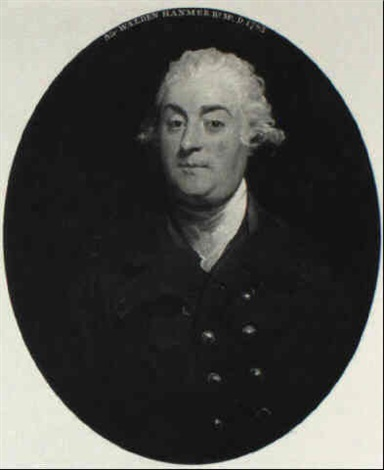
Sir Walden Hanmer

Sir Walden Hanmer, 1st Baronet (1717–1783) was a British lawyer and politician who sat in the House of Commons between 1768 and 1780.

== Early life ==
Hanmer was the only son of Job Hanmer, bencher of Lincoln's Inn and his wife Susanna Walden, daughter of Thomas Walden of Simpson, Buckinghamshire, and was baptised on 19 March 1717. He was educated at Eton College and entered Lincoln's Inn in 1732. He matriculated at Balliol College, Oxford on 12 June 1736. In 1739 he succeeded his father. He was called to the bar in 1741. He married Anne Graham, daughter of Henry Vere Graham of Holbrook, Suffolk, sometime before 1747. In 1758 he became a bencher of Lincolns Inn He retired early from practice as a barrister and became a magistrate in several counties.

== Political career ==
Hanmer first stood for Parliament in 1761 at Bedford but withdrew after the first day's polling. He applied for a Welsh judgeship in 1766 but was unsuccessful. After considering standing for Bedford again in 1768 he stood instead at Sudbury where he was returned as Member of Parliament after a contest. In 1773 he succeeded to Hanmer estates in Flintshire on the death of his cousin Humphrey Hanmer, and was created baronet on 21 May 1774. He stood again at Sudbury at the 1774 general election but was defeated in a contest. He was then seated on petition on 22 March 1775. He did not stand in the 1780 general election

== Later life ==
Hanmer died on 20 October 1783. He was succeeded in the baronetcy by his son Thomas.

Parliament of Great Britain
Preceded by Thomas Fonnereau; John Henniker	Member of Parliament for Sudbury; 1768–1774; With: (Sir) Patrick Blake	Succeeded by Thomas Fonnereau; Philip Champion Crespigny
Preceded by Thomas Fonnereau; Philip Champion Crespigny	Member of Parliament for Sudbury; 1775–1780; With: (Sir) Patrick Blake	Succeeded by (Sir) Patrick Blake; Philip Champion Crespigny
Baronetage of Great Britain
New creation	Baronet (of Hanmer); 1774-1783	Succeeded by Thomas Hanmer
