= Thomas George Fonnereau =

English author and artist

Thomas George Fonnereau (1789–1850) was an English writer and artist.

Fonnereau was the second and posthumous son of Thomas Fonnereau (1745–1788), son of Margaret Fonnereau née Martyn (1717–1778) and Zachary Philip Fonnereau (1706–1778), the descendant of an ancient family from the neighbourhood of La Rochelle, which settled in England at the Edict of Nantes and realised a fortune in the linen trade; and of Harriet, daughter of John Hanson of Reading, Berkshire. His father died at Topsham, Devonshire, on 26 December 1788; his mother survived until 2 February 1832.

== Early life and education ==
Thomas George Fonnereau was born at Reading on 25 August 1789. After practising as an attorney in partnership with John Gregson at 8 Angel Court, Throgmorton Street, from 1816 to 1834, he succeeded, by the death of a relation, into property and devoted himself for the rest of his life to his books and his friends. His political opinions leaned to conservatism, and he published in 1831 a 'Practical View of the Question of Parliamentary Reform', which was subsequently printed in two editions. It was written mainly to prove that a purely democratic government is inappropriate to the circumstances of England, and that the existing system was 'founded on a concentration of the various interests of the country in the House of Commons'.

== Career ==
While still a lawyer he occupied chambers in The Albany, and as a 'great lover and liberal patron of art' entertained a distinguished set of artists and wits at 'choice little dinners', which are recorded in the pages of Planché's 'Recollections'. With one of these friends he travelled in Italy circa 1840 and, on his return, there were printed for private distribution a few copies of 'Mems. of a Tour in Italy, from Sketches by T. G. F., inspired by his friend and fellow-traveller, C. S., esq., R.A.' (probably Clarkson Stanfield), containing thirteen sketches of scenery. Printing was at the expense of D. Colnaghi. On inheriting his fortune he realised a long held ambition, building 'a bachelor's kennel', with the assistance of his friend, Decimus Burton. It was his own design of 'an Italian villa with colonnade and campanile', which arose at Haydon Hill, near Bushey, Hertfordshire.

== Death and legacy ==
Fonnereau died in this building on 13 November 1850, and was buried in a vault in Aldenham churchyard, with many members of the Hibbert family, his nearest relatives. His was later remembered because of his work for private circulation, printed in 1849, called 'The Diary of a Dutiful Son, by H. E. O.' (the second letters of his three names). A copy accidentally came into the hands of Lockhart, who inserted numerous extracts from its pages into the 'Quarterly Review', lxxxvi. 449–63 (1850). The introduction to the volume sets out that his father urged him to keep a diary of the remarks which he heard in the house of a distant relation, 'a literary man in affluent circumstances', and that some little time afterwards he showed the diary as a proof that he had adopted the suggestion.

A concluding paragraph reveals that this was an imposition, as the conversations were the product of his own inventive powers. They contained many original and acute observations, from a thinker not dissatisfied with the world, and not anxious for much change, on poetry, philosophy, and political economy, and they present in style and substance an accurate representation of his talk. Lockhart suggested its publication to the world, and a copy, evidently prepared for the press, was found among Fonnereau's papers after his death. This was published by John Murray in 1864.
