= Martyn Fonnereau =

Martyn Fonnereau (19 March 1741 – 18 May 1817) was the second son of Zachary Philip Fonnereau, a British merchant and banker of Huguenot extraction.

He was a Director of the Bank of England from 1771 to 1783.

He and his younger brother Thomas were named in the will of Jane (Poyntz) Malcher, which prompted the precedential case Fonnereau v. Poyntz in 1785.

Parliament of Great Britain
Preceded by Thomas Fonnereau; Richard Combe	Member of Parliament for Aldeburgh; 1779–1784; With: Richard Combe 1779–1780; Philip Champion Crespigny 1780–1784	Succeeded by Philip Champion Crespigny; Samuel Salt
