= Thomas Fonnereau =

British merchant and politician

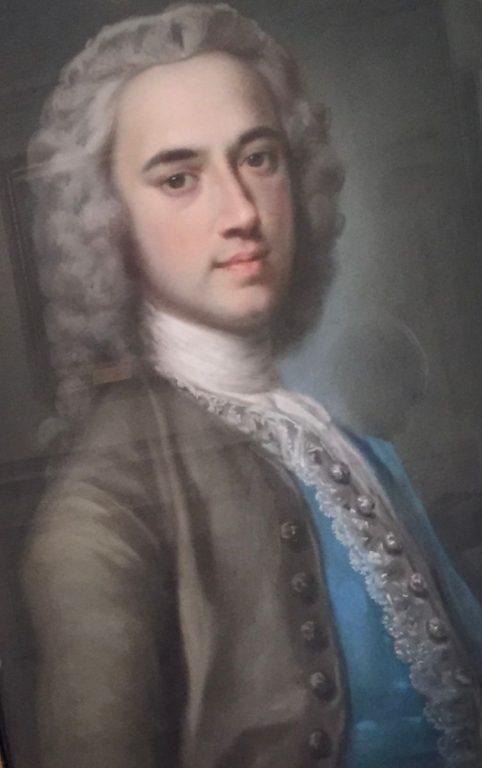

Thomas Fonnereau (27 October 1699, in London – 20 March 1779) was a British merchant and politician who sat in the House of Commons between 1741 and 1779.

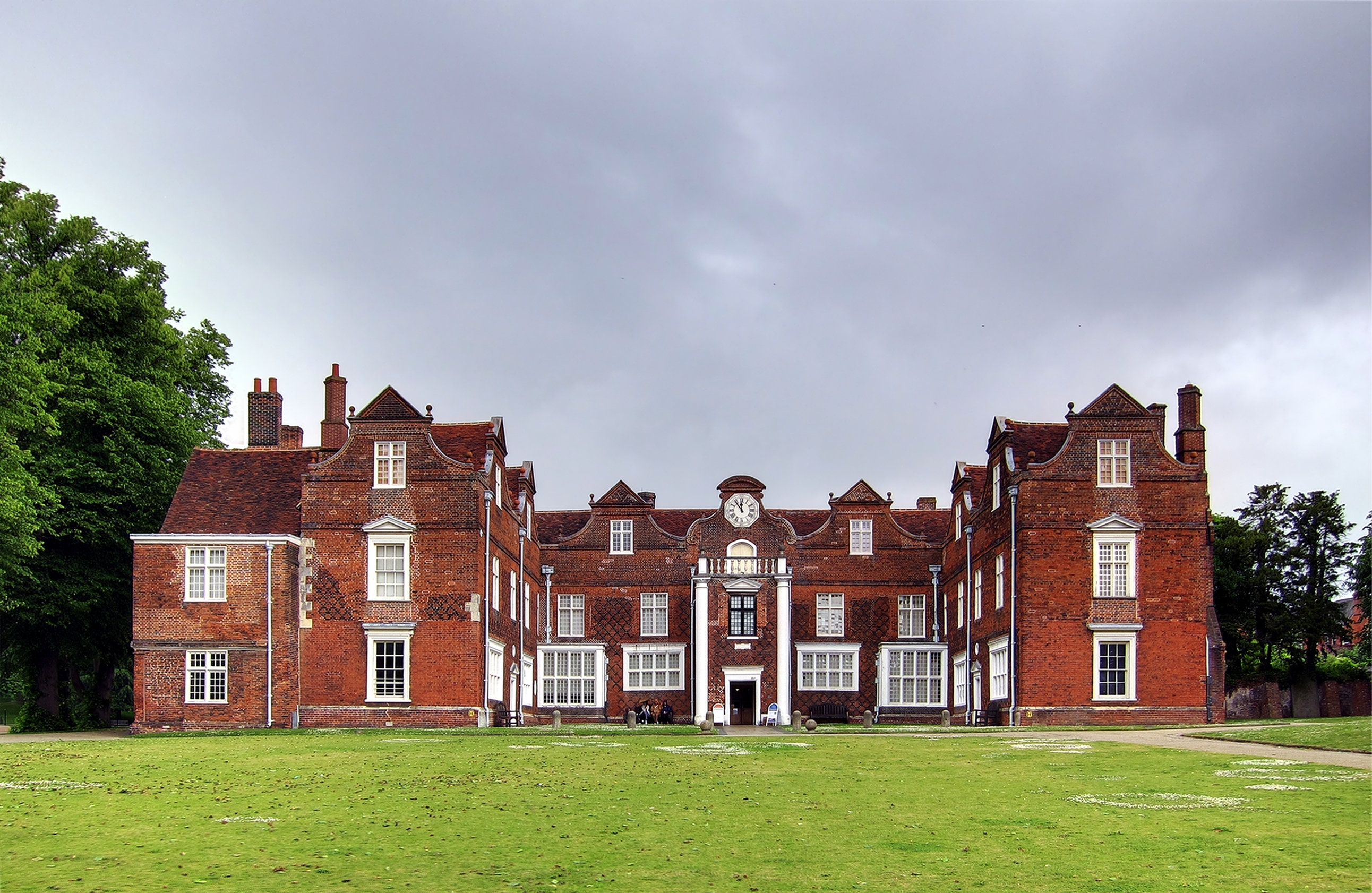
Christchurch mansion, Ipswich

Fonnrereau was the eldest son of Claude Fonnereau, a wealthy Huguenot merchant who had settled in Ipswich. He succeeded his father in 1740, inheriting his estates, which included Christchurch Mansion in Ipswich.

Returned for Sudbury in 1741, he continued to sit for that constituency until 1768, several of those years in conjunction with Thomas Walpole, a business connection. However, he retained interests in Suffolk and was a member of the Free British Fishery Society, as well as MP for the constituency of Aldeburgh at the end of his life, serving briefly alongside his brother, Zachary Philip Fonnereau.

He died unmarried in 1779 and was succeeded by his brother, Dr. Claudius Fonnereau (1701–1785).

Parliament of Great Britain
Preceded by Richard Price; Edward Stephenson	member of parliament for Sudbury; 1741–1768; With: Carteret Leathes 1741–1747; Richard Rigby 1747–1754; Thomas Walpole 1754–1761; John Henniker 1761–1768	Succeeded by Sir Patrick Blake, Bt; Walden Hanmer
Preceded by Zachary Philip Fonnereau; Nicholas Linwood	member of parliament for Aldeburgh; 1773–1779; With: Zachary Philip Fonnereau 1773–1774; Richard Combe 1774–1779	Succeeded by Richard Combe; Martyn Fonnereau
