= Charles Stanhope =

Charles Stanhope may refer to:

- Sir Charles Stanhope, 2nd Baron Stanhope (1595–1675), English landowner, courtier, and writer of marginalia
- Charles Stanhope (1708–1736), British MP for Derby 1730–6
- Charles Stanhope (1673–1760), British MP for Milborne Port 1717–1722 and Aldborough 1734–5
- Charles Stanhope, 3rd Earl Stanhope (1753–1816), British statesman and scientist
- Charles Stanhope, 3rd Earl of Harrington (1753–1829), Commander-in-Chief, Ireland 1806–1812
- Charles Stanhope, 4th Earl of Harrington (1780–1851)
- Charles Stanhope, 7th Earl of Harrington (1809–1881)
- Charles Stanhope, 8th Earl of Harrington (1844–1917), polo player
- Charles Stanhope, 10th Earl of Harrington (1887–1929)
- Charles Stanhope, 12th Earl of Harrington, (born 1945), 210th in the Sunday Times Rich List 2004
