= William Stanhope, 11th Earl of Harrington =

British peer (1922–2009)

The Right Honourable The Earl of Harrington
- Coat of arms of the Earls of Harrington

Member of the House of Lords
- Lord Temporal
- In office 16 November 1929 – 11 November 1999
- Preceded by: The 10th Earl of Harrington
- Succeeded by: Seat abolished (Note: Pursuant to the House of Lords Act 1999.)

Personal details
- Born: William Henry Leicester Stanhope; 24 August 1922
- Died: 12 April 2009 (aged 86)
- Spouses: Eileen Foley Grey (m. 1942; div. 1947); Ann Theodora Chute (m. 1947; div. 1962); Priscilla Margaret Cubitt (after 1964)
- Children: Lady Jane Cameron; Lady Avena Maxwell; Charles Stanhope, 12th Earl of Harrington; Lady Trina Stanhope; Hon. Steven Stanhope; Lady Sarah Barry; Hon. John Stanhope; Isabella Campbell, Countess Cawdor
- Parents: Charles Stanhope, 10th Earl of Harrington; Margaret Trelawney Seaton
- Occupation: Peer and officer

William Henry Leicester Stanhope, 11th Earl of Harrington (24 August 1922 – 12 April 2009), was a British army captain and peer.

== Early life and education ==
Stanhope was the son of Charles Stanhope, 10th Earl of Harrington, and Margaret Trelawney Seaton. He succeeded in the earldom on the death of his father on 16 November 1929. He was educated at Eton and the Royal Military College, Sandhurst.

In 1967, the 11th Earl also succeeded as 8th Viscount Stanhope of Mahon and 8th Baron Stanhope of Elvaston, following the death of his distant relative James Stanhope, 7th Earl Stanhope. He inherited these titles (but not the Stanhope earldom) by a special remainder in the latter's patent which allowed these titles to be inherited by the male heirs of John Stanhope, father of the first Earl of Harrington.

== Military service ==
Lord Harrington fought in the Second World War. He gained the rank of captain in the service of the 15th/19th King's Royal Hussars (Royal Armoured Corps).

== Personal life ==
Lord Harrington married three times and had eight children, seventeen grandchildren and nine great-grandchildren. He married, firstly, Eileen Foley Grey, daughter of Sir John Foley Grey, 8th Baronet, and Jean Jessie May de Sales la Terrière, on 5 February 1942. He and Eileen Foley Grey were divorced in 1947. They had three children, six grandchildren and nine great-grandchildren:

- Lady Jane Stanhope (25 November 1942 – January 1974), she married Anthony Cameron on 29 September 1965. They had two children and five grandchildren:
  - James Cameron (born 28 March 1967), he married Miriam Nugent on 17 July 1997. They have two sons and a daughter:
    - Jack Cameron (born 13 October 2000)
    - Conn Cameron (born 20 December 2001)
    - Abigail Cameron
  - Henrietta Cameron (born 1970), she married Austin Power on 30 December 1997. They have one daughter and one son:
    - Zoey Jane Power (born 17 May 2001)
    - David Power
- Lady Avena Margaret Clare Stanhope (born 29 March 1944), she married Adrian James Maxwell on 12 July 1969. They have two daughters:
  - Sacha Jane Maxwell (born 1974)
  - Kerry Alice Maxwell (born 1978)
- Charles Henry Leicester Stanhope, 12th Earl of Harrington (born 20 July 1945), he married Virginia Freeman-Jackson on 14 September 1966 and they were divorced in 1983. They have two children and four grandchildren. He remarried Anita Fuglesang in 1984.
  - Hon. William Henry Leicester Stanhope (born 14 October 1967), he married Candida Bond (born 1973) in 2001. They have two children:
    - Tirkana Stanhope (born 1 August 2003)
    - Augustus Stanhope (born 26 September 2005)
  - Serena Stanhope (born 1 March 1970), she married David Armstrong-Jones, 2nd Earl of Snowdon (born 1961), nephew of Queen Elizabeth II, in 1993. They have two children:
    - Charles Patrick Inigo Armstrong-Jones, Viscount Linley (born 1 July 1999)
    - Lady Margarita Elizabeth Rose Alleyne Armstrong-Jones (born 14 May 2002)

Lord Harrington married, secondly, Ann Theodora Chute, daughter of Major Richard Arenbourg Blennerhassett Chute, on 24 January 1947. He and Ann Theodora Chute were divorced in 1962. They had three children and five grandchildren:

- Lady Trina Maria Stanhope (born 30 December 1947)
- Hon. Steven Francis Lincoln Stanhope (born 12 December 1951), he married Maureen Cole in 1978. They have two children:
  - Ben Stanhope (born 1978)
  - Tara Stanhope (born 1979)
- Lady Sarah Sue Stanhope (born 12 December 1951), she married Robert Barry on 11 August 1970. They have three sons:
  - Mark Barry (born 1972)
  - Tristran Barry (born 1975)
  - Guy Barry (born 1975)

Lord Harrington married, thirdly, Priscilla Margaret Cubitt, daughter of Major Hon. Archibald Edward Cubitt (son of the 2nd Baron Ashcombe) and Sibell Margaret Norman, on 14 October 1964. They had two children and six grandchildren:

- Hon. John Fitzroy Stanhope (born 20 August 1965), he married Arporn Tongkaew on 19 May 2007. They have two children:
  - Kirati Leicester James Stanhope (born 2007)
  - Kiattiya Arabella Stanhope (born 2012)
- Lady Isabella Rachel Stanhope (born 1 October 1966), she married Colin Campbell, 7th Earl Cawdor, on 21 October 1994. They have four children:
  - Lady Jean Campbell (born 1997)
  - James Chester Campbell, Viscount Emlyn (born 1998)
  - Lady Eleanor Campbell (born 2000)
  - Lady Beatrice Campbell (born 2004)

In 2003, Lord Harrington lived at The Glen, Ballingarry, County Limerick, Ireland.

On 12 April 2009, Lord Harrington died at the age 86 at Ballingarry, in County Limerick, Ireland.

== Notes ==
Peerage of Great Britain
Preceded by Charles Stanhope	Earl of Harrington; 1929–2009; Member of the House of Lords (1929–1999)	Succeeded by Charles Stanhope
Preceded by Charles Stanhope	Baron Harrington; 1929–2009	Succeeded by Charles Stanhope
Preceded by James Stanhope	Viscount Stanhope; 1967–2009	Succeeded by Charles Stanhope
Preceded by James Stanhope	Baron Stanhope; 1967–2009	Succeeded by Charles Stanhope
