= Sydney Stanhope, 6th Earl of Harrington =

English peer

Sydney Seymour Hyde Stanhope, 6th Earl of Harrington
- 6th Earl of Harrington
- Arms of the Earls of Harrington
- Tenure: 1862–1866
- Predecessor: Leicester Stanhope, 5th Earl of Harrington (Father)
- Successor: Charles Wyndham Stanhope, 7th Earl of Harrington (1st Cousin)
- Other titles: Viscount Petersham; Baron Harrington
- Born: Sydney Seymour Hyde Stanhope; 27 September 1845; Ashburnham House, Little Dean's Yard, Westminster, London
- Died: 22 February 1866 (aged 20)
- Residence: Elvaston Castle; Harrington House
- Issue: Died without Issue
- Parents: Leicester Stanhope, 5th Earl of Harrington; Elizabeth Green, daughter of William Green and Ann Rose Hall, both of Jamaica.

Sydney Seymour Hyde Stanhope, 6th Earl of Harrington (27 September 1845 – 22 February 1866) was an English peer.

Born Mr Sydney Seymore Hyde Stanhope at Ashburnham House in Westminster, London, Stanhope was the second son of Leicester Stanhope, 5th Earl of Harrington and Elizabeth Williams Green, and only became heir to his father's peerage following the premature death of his brother Algernon Russell Gayleard Stanhope (1838–1847).

Stanhope inherited the Earldom in 1862, at the age of 16, following the death of his father.

Lord Harrington died 22 February 1866, aged 20; unmarried and without issue.

He was succeeded by his first cousin Charles Wyndham Stanhope, 7th Earl of Harrington.

Peerage of Great Britain
Preceded by Leicester Stanhope	Earl of Harrington; 1862–1866	Succeeded by Charles Stanhope
Preceded by Leicester Stanhope	Baron Harrington; 1862–1866	Succeeded by Charles Stanhope
