= Charles Stanhope, 8th Earl of Harrington =

British peer and polo player (1844–1917)

Charles Augustus Stanhope, 8th Earl of Harrington
- 8th Earl of Harrington
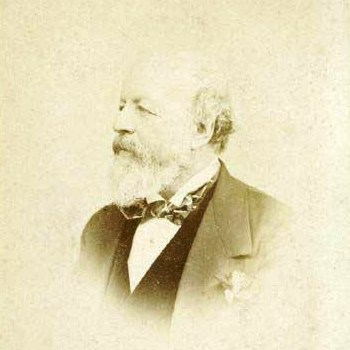
- A studio portrait of the 8th Earl
- Tenure: 1881–1917
- Predecessor: Charles Stanhope, 7th Earl of Harrington (father)
- Successor: Dudley Stanhope, 9th Earl of Harrington (younger brother)
- Other titles: Viscount Petersham; Baron Harrington
- Born: Charles Augustus Stanhope; 9 January 1844; Dublin, Ireland
- Died: 5 February 1917 (aged 73); Elvaston Castle, Derbyshire
- Residence: Elvaston Castle; Harrington House
- Spouses: The Hon. Eva Elizabeth Carrington, daughter of Robert Carrington, 2nd Baron Carrington.
- Issue: No issue
- Parents: Charles Stanhope, 7th Earl of Harrington; Elizabeth Still de Pearsall (daughter of Robert Lucas de Pearsall of Wartensee Castle, Switzerland)
- Occupation: Peer, polo player

Charles Augustus Stanhope, 8th Earl of Harrington (9 January 1844 – 5 February 1917), known as Viscount Petersham from 1866 to 1881, was a British peer and successful polo player.

== Biography ==
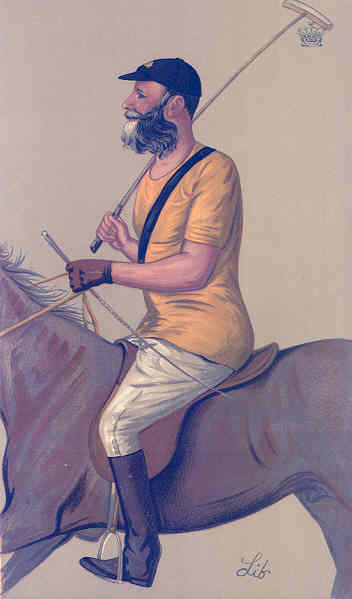
"Yeoman-like Polo" As depicted by "Lib" (Libero Prosperi) in Vanity Fair, 19 September 1891

== Early life ==
Harrington was the son of Charles Stanhope, 7th Earl of Harrington, and Elizabeth Still de Pearsall.

== Polo ==
He learned polo in Malta while in the Cheshire Yeomanry, a regiment of which he became lieutenant-colonel in command from 1899 to 1905 and Honorary Colonel thereafter. In 1885 he played at the back in the Gloucestershire team that won the County Cup. Harrington won the Hurlingham Champion Cup in 1892 with Sussex County and the Rugby Open Cup with Cheshire. His rotund figure and flowing beard were a memorable image on British polo grounds and an obvious choice for caricature in Vanity Fair. Harrington was the inventor of the papier-mâché goal posts and was president of the County Polo Association and the first president of the Polo Pony Society. He was responsible for the establishment of the Polo Pony Stud book. He played at the Staffordshire Polo Club, based at Ingestre Hall, founded by Charles Chetwynd-Talbot, 20th Earl of Shrewsbury, in 1895.

== Other sports ==
The then Viscount Petersham also took part in tilting competitions at the Wenlock Olympian Society Annual Games in 1881, when he came a joint second in flat tilting. He was invited by the games' founder, William Penny Brookes, to be President of the games for 1882, by which time he had succeeded to his Earldom. In the same games he was the only President to also participate; he competed in the flat tilting, but did not take a ring, and took part in a tent-pegging demonstration. In 1883 he donated a prize to the Society for flat tilting.

He was also Master of the Harrington Fox Hounds which hunted in south Nottinghamshire, and a prominent member of the National Hunt Committee.

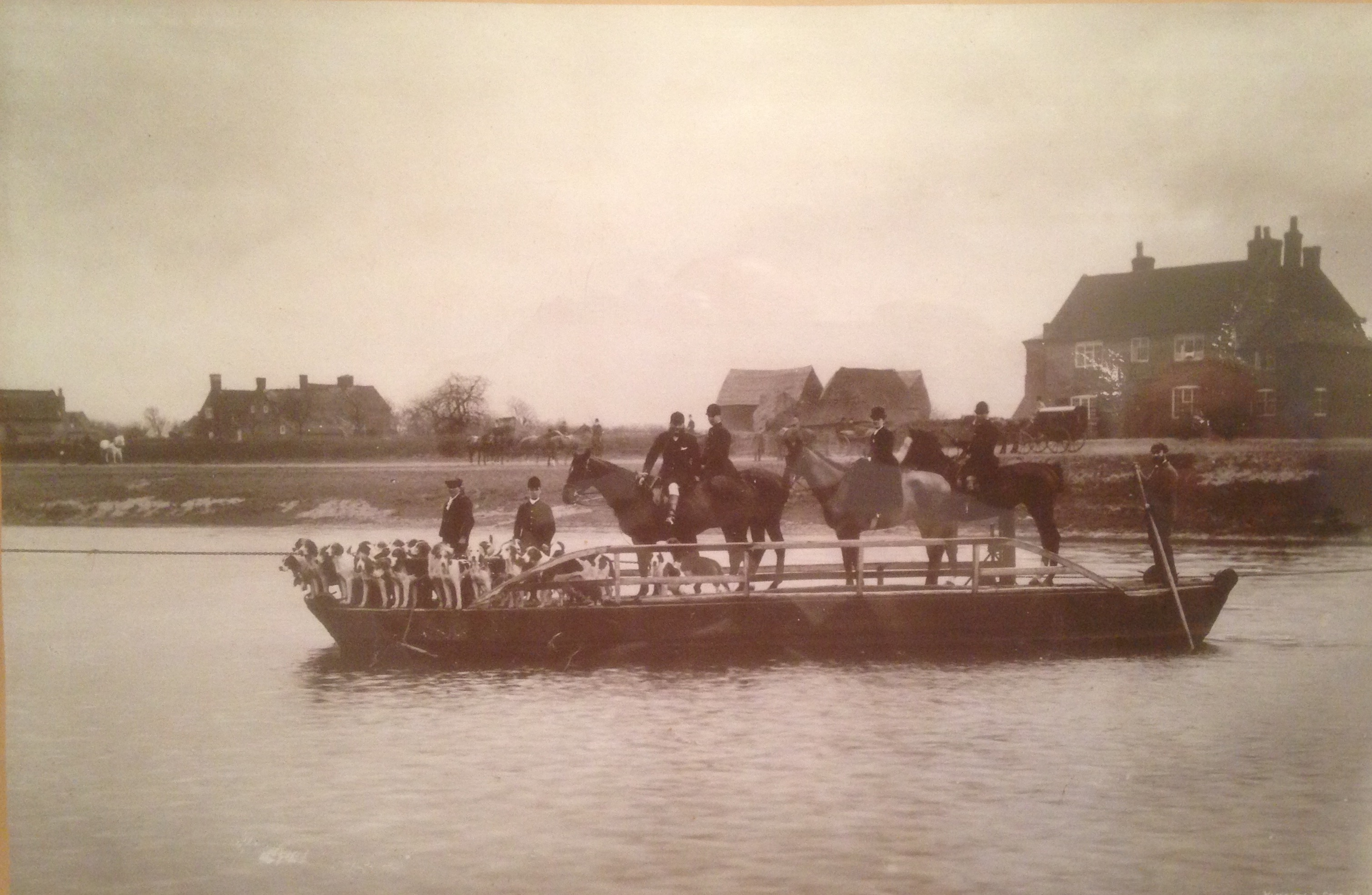
The 8th Earl crossing the River Trent with the South Notts Hounds – picture dated 19 April 1890

Coat of Arms of the Earls of Harrington

== Other offices ==
He was appointed a deputy lieutenant of Derbyshire on 26 January 1917. Harrington served as aide-de-camp to King Edward VII between 1907 and 1910,> and to King George V thereafter.

== Family ==
Lord Harrington's main family homes in 1883 were Elvaston Castle, Derbyshire, and Gawsworth Old Hall, Cheshire.

Lord Harrington married the Honourable Eva Elizabeth Carrington, daughter of Robert Carrington, 2nd Baron Carrington, in 1869. He died in February 1917, aged 73, at Elvaston Castle, of blood poisoning caused by burns sustained at his engineer's workshop, and was buried at Elvaston parish church. He was succeeded in his titles by his younger brother Dudley. Lady Harrington died in 1919.

== Notes ==
Peerage of Great Britain
Preceded by Charles Stanhope	Earl of Harrington; 1881–1917	Succeeded by Dudley Stanhope
Preceded by Charles Stanhope	Baron Harrington; 1881–1917	Succeeded by Dudley Stanhope
