= Charles Stanhope, 7th Earl of Harrington =

English peer

Charles Wyndham Stanhope, 7th Earl of Harrington
- 7th Earl of Harrington
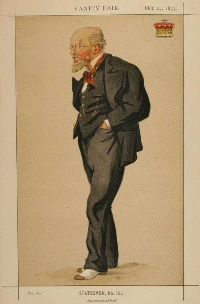
- Tenure: 1866–1881
- Predecessor: Sydney Stanhope, 6th Earl of Harrington (1st Cousin)
- Successor: Charles Augustus Stanhope, 8th Earl of Harrington (Son)
- Other titles: Viscount Petersham; Baron Harrington
- Born: Charles Wyndham Stanhope; 16 August 1809
- Died: 26 June 1881 (aged 71)
- Residence: Elvaston Castle; Harrington House
- Spouses: Elizabeth Still de Pearsall (daughter of Robert Lucas de Pearsall of Wartensee Castle, Switzerland, and Marie Henriette Elizabeth Hobday)
- Issue: Caroline Marguerite Stanhope; Leicester Philippa Stanhope; Charles Stanhope, 8th Earl of Harrington; Fitzroy William Whitbread Stanhope; Fanny Joanna Stanhope; Lincoln Edwin Stanhope; Wyndham Edward Campbell Stanhope; Jane Harriet Charlotte Stanhope; Gerald Louis Stanhope; Dudley Stanhope, 9th Earl of Harrington; Blanche Georgina Stanhope; Charlotte Augusta Stanhope
- Parents: Rev. Hon. Fitzroy Henry Richard Stanhope, son of Charles Stanhope, 3rd Earl of Harrington; Caroline Wyndham, illegitimate daughter of Hon. Charles Wyndham.

Charles Wyndham Stanhope, 7th Earl of Harrington (16 August 1809 – 26 June 1881) was an English peer.

Charles was the son of the Rev. Hon. Fitzroy Henry Richard Stanhope (24 Apr 1787 – 11 Apr 1864), son of Charles Stanhope, 3rd Earl of Harrington, and Caroline Wyndham (d. 11 Feb 1876), illegitimate daughter of Hon. Charles Wyndham.

Charles inherited his titles in 1866, following the death of his childless 1st cousin, Sydney Seymour Hyde Stanhope, 6th Earl of Harrington.

Lord Harrington died 26 June 1881 and was succeeded by his son: Charles Stanhope, 8th Earl of Harrington

== Family ==
On 16 February 1839, in Paris, France, Charles married Elizabeth Still de Pearsall (b. 8 Mar 1821 d. 6 Feb 1912 aged 89), daughter of Robert Lucas de Pearsall of Wartensee Castle, Switzerland (formerly of Willesbridge House, Gloucestershire), and Marie Henriette Elizabeth Hobday.

Children of Elizabeth and Charles:

- Caroline Marguerite Stanhope (b. 28 January 1840, d. 7 Aug 1906). Married James Penrose Ingham, son of Sir James Taylor Ingham.
- Leicester Philippa Stanhope (b. 1842, bpt. 31 July 1842 Gawsworth, Cheshire, d. 20 Jul 1920). She married William Sharp Waithman (died 1922), of Merlin Park, County Galway, on 6 September 1883.
- Charles Augustus Stanhope, later 8th Earl of Harrington (9 January 1844 – 5 February 1917)
- Fitzroy William Whitbread Stanhope (25 Dec 1845 – 9 Dec 1913). Married 1st, Jessie Marion Hawkins Hamilton, adopted daughter of J.H. Gell; 2nd, Ethel Chapman, daughter of Peter Godfrey Chapman. No Issue.
- Fanny Joanna Stanhope (b. 29 December 1846)
- Lieutenant Lincoln Edwin Stanhope (6 Apr 1849 – 1 June 1902: accidentally drowned). Married Helene de Bravura, daughter of Leon de Bravura and Countess de Galve. Lieutenant of the 7th Dragoon Guards. No Issue.
- Wyndham Edward Campbell Stanhope (17 June 1851 – 27 July 1883). Married Camille Caroline Reyloff, daughter of Edward Reyloff. No Issue.
- Jane Harriet Charlotte Stanhope (29 Jul 1853 – 8 Sep 1889). Married Errol Augustus Joseph Henry Blake, 4th Baron Wallscourt.
- Gerald Louis Stanhope (6 July 1855 – 19 May 1866). No Issue
- Dudley Henry Eden Stanhope, later 9th Earl of Harrington (13 Jan 1859 – 13 Nov 1928).
- Blanche Georgina Stanhope (b. 22 June 1861, d. Feb 1939)
- Charlotte Augusta Stanhope (b. 11 November 1863)

Peerage of Great Britain
Preceded by Sydney Stanhope	Earl of Harrington; 1866–1881	Succeeded by Charles Stanhope
Preceded by Sydney Stanhope	Baron Harrington; 1866–1881	Succeeded by Charles Stanhope
