= Charles Stanhope, 10th Earl of Harrington =

British captain and peer

Charles Joseph Leicester, 10th Earl of Harrington
- 10th Earl of Harrington
- Arms of the Earls of Harrington
- Tenure: 1928–1929
- Predecessor: Dudley Stanhope, 9th Earl of Harrington (elder brother)
- Successor: William Stanhope, 11th Earl of Harrington (son)
- Other titles: Viscount Petersham; Baron Harrington
- Born: Charles Joseph Leicester Stanhope; 9 November 1887
- Died: 16 November 1929 (aged 42)
- Residence: Elvaston Castle; Harrington House
- Spouse: Margaret Trelawney Seaton (daughter of Major H. H. D. Seaton)
- Parents: Dudley Stanhope, 9th Earl of Harrington; Kathleen Wood
- Occupation: Peer and Captain (Deputy Lieutenant)

Charles Joseph Leicester Stanhope, 10th Earl of Harrington MC, DL (9 October 1887 – 16 November 1929), was a British captain and peer.

He was the son of Dudley Stanhope, 9th Earl of Harrington, and Kathleen Wood. He succeeded in the earldom on the death of his father on 13 November 1928.

Harrington was a captain in the 15th Hussars, Reserve of Officers and was awarded the Military Cross. He also served as a Deputy Lieutenant of Derbyshire.

== Family ==
Harrington married Margaret Trelawney Seaton, daughter of Major H. H. D. Seaton, on 23 April 1919. They had two children:

- Charles Stanhope (19 January 1921 – 23 January 1921)
- William Henry Leicester Stanhope, 11th Earl of Harrington (24 August 1922 – 12 April 2009)

Lord Harrington died on 16 November 1929 at age 42.

Peerage of Great Britain
| Preceded by Dudley Stanhope | Earl of Harrington; 1928–1929 | Succeeded by William Stanhope |
| Preceded by Dudley Stanhope | Baron Harrington; 1928–1929 | Succeeded by William Stanhope |
