= Leicester Stanhope, 5th Earl of Harrington =

English peer and soldier (1784–1862)

Leicester FitzGerald Charles Stanhope, 5th Earl of Harrington, CB (2 September 1784 – 7 September 1862), styled The Honourable Leicester Stanhope until 1851, was an English peer and soldier.

== Early life ==
Leicester Stanhope was born in Dublin in 1784, the third son of Charles Stanhope, 3rd Earl of Harrington, and Jane Stanhope, Countess of Harrington (née Fleming).

== Career ==
Stanhope became a Cornet and Sublieutenant in the 1st Regiment of Life Guards on 1 October 1799. He was promoted lieutenant on 20 October 1802. He exchanged into the 9th Regiment of Foot on 19 March 1803, and on 2 April 1803 purchased a captaincy in the 10th (Prince of Wales's Own) Regiment of (Light) Dragoons. On 9 November 1803, he exchanged into the Carabiniers (6th Dragoon Guards), and on 27 January 1813, into the 17th Regiment of Light Dragoons. In 1807 he served in South America, and was present at the attack on Buenos Aires. Promoted major, he was appointed Deputy Adjutant-General in the East Indies on 29 June 1815, as a brevet lieutenant-colonel. He exchanged into the 47th Regiment of Foot while serving there and was appointed Deputy Quartermaster-General on 24 April 1817.

From late 1817 to 1818, Stanhope and his regiment took part in the Third Anglo-Maratha War. On 14 October 1818, he was appointed a Companion of the Bath for his service in the conflict. He resigned as quartermaster on 29 March 1821 and purchased an unattached lieutenant-colonelcy on 26 June 1823. He was brevetted colonel on 10 January 1837.

He is known as a worker with Lord Byron in the cause of Greek independence, although while he was in Greece in 1823 and 1824 his relations with Byron were not altogether harmonious. He wrote A Sketch of the History and Influence of the Press in British India (1823), and Greece, in 1823 and 1824.

== Personal life and death ==
On 23 April 1831, at St James's Church, Piccadilly, he married Elizabeth Green, daughter of William Green and Ann Rose Hall, both of Jamaica. They had four children:

- Lady Anna Caroline Stanhope (16 July 1832 – 9 April 1913), married Edward Sacheverell Chandos-Pole and had issue, including Reginald Chandos-Pole.
- Algernon Russell Gayleard Stanhope (1838–1847)
- Lady Geraldine Evelyn Stanhope (26 January 1841 – 5 January 1914), married Edward Leeson, 6th Earl of Milltown, without issue
- Sydney Stanhope, 6th Earl of Harrington (1845–1866)

In 1851, he inherited the earldom from his brother, Charles Stanhope, 4th Earl of Harrington.

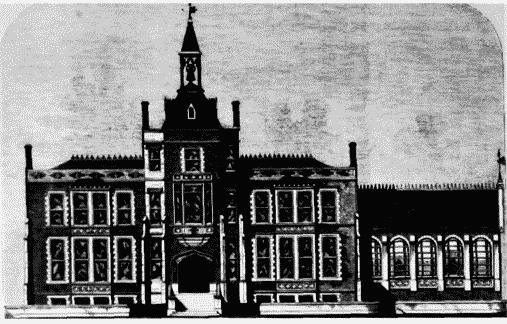
Front View of Harrington House, 1852

In 1852 Stanhope acquired a plot of land formerly belonging to the kitchen garden of Kensington Palace: he constructed Harrington House (or No. 13 Kensington Palace Gardens), which was built in his favourite gothic style, at the cost of £15,000. Harrington House was owned by the family until the First World War; Since 1930 Harrington House has been home to the Russian Embassy. The exterior of the house was designed by Decimus Burton, following plans sketched by the Earl. Works were carried under the supervision of Charles James Richardson, who was the surveyor to the Earl's extensive South Kensington estate. Details and the final plans are thought to have been left to Richardson; he did, however, acknowledge the "great measure" the Earl was involved in the design. The house's unorthodox architecture was widely criticised, including by Richardson; Lord Harrington, however, thought it to be "a house without a fault".

Stanhope died 7 September 1862, aged 78, at Harrington House.
He was succeeded by his son: Sydney Seymour Hyde Stanhope, 6th Earl of Harrington

Peerage of Great Britain
Preceded by Charles Stanhope	Earl of Harrington; 1851–1862	Succeeded by Sydney Stanhope
Preceded by Charles Stanhope	Baron Harrington; 1851–1862	Succeeded by Sydney Stanhope
