= James Stanhope, 7th Earl Stanhope =

British Earl and politician

The Right Honourable The Earl Stanhope KG DSO MC PC
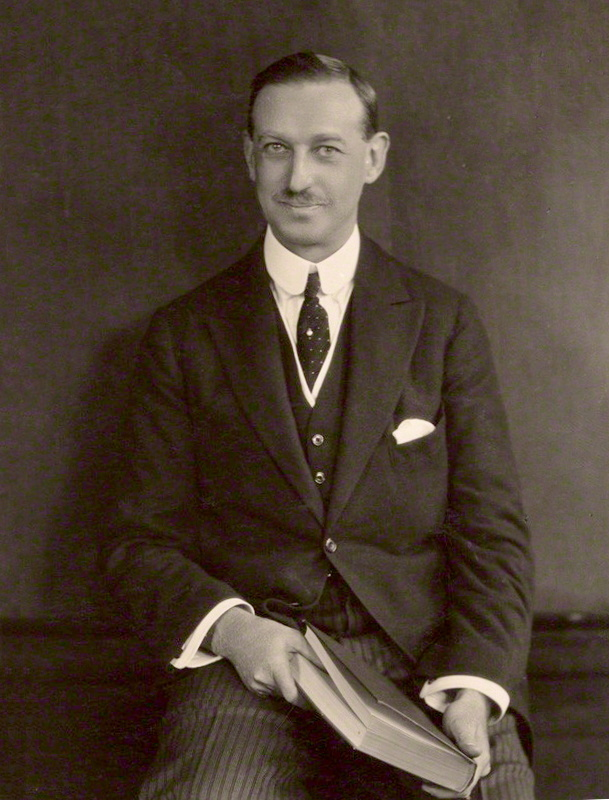

Leader of the House of Lords
- In office 21 February 1938 – 14 May 1940
- Prime Minister: Neville Chamberlain
- Preceded by: The Viscount Halifax
- Succeeded by: The Viscount Caldecote

Lord President of the Council
- In office 3 September 1939 – 10 May 1940
- Prime Minister: Neville Chamberlain
- Preceded by: The Viscount Runciman of Doxford
- Succeeded by: Neville Chamberlain

First Lord of the Admiralty
- In office 27 October 1938 – 3 September 1939
- Prime Minister: Neville Chamberlain
- Preceded by: Duff Cooper
- Succeeded by: Winston Churchill

President of the Board of Education
- In office 28 May 1937 – 27 October 1938
- Prime Minister: Neville Chamberlain
- Preceded by: Hon. Oliver Stanley
- Succeeded by: The Earl De La Warr

First Commissioner of Works
- In office 16 June 1936 – 27 May 1937
- Prime Minister: Stanley Baldwin
- Preceded by: Hon. William Ormsby-Gore
- Succeeded by: Sir Philip Sassoon, Bt

Parliamentary Under-Secretary of State for Foreign Affairs
- In office 18 January 1934 – 16 June 1936
- Prime Minister: Ramsay MacDonald; Stanley Baldwin
- Preceded by: Anthony Eden
- Succeeded by: Viscount Cranborne

Parliamentary Under-Secretary of State for War
- In office 10 November 1931 – 18 January 1934
- Prime Minister: Ramsay MacDonald
- Preceded by: The Lord Marley
- Succeeded by: The Lord Strathcona and Mount Royal

Parliamentary and Financial Secretary to the Admiralty
- In office 24 August 1931 – 10 November 1931
- Prime Minister: Ramsay MacDonald
- Preceded by: Charles Ammon
- Succeeded by: Lord Stanley

Civil Lord of the Admiralty
- In office 11 November 1924 – 7 June 1929
- Prime Minister: Stanley Baldwin
- Preceded by: Frank Hodges
- Succeeded by: George Hall

Parliamentary Secretary to the War Office
- In office 14 December 1916 – 10 January 1919
- Prime Minister: David Lloyd George
- Preceded by: Position established
- Succeeded by: Position abolished

Member of the House of Lords
- Lord Temporal
- In office 20 April 1905 – 15 August 1967
- Preceded by: The 6th Earl Stanhope
- Succeeded by: The 11th Earl of Harrington (Note: As Viscount Stanhope of Mahon. He was already a member of the House of Lords as Earl of Harrington.)

Personal details
- Born: James Richard Stanhope; 11 November 1880
- Died: 15 August 1967 (aged 86)
- Party: Conservative
- Spouse(s): Lady Eileen Browne (1889–1940)
- Parent(s): Arthur Stanhope, 6th Earl Stanhope; Evelyn Pennefather

James Richard Stanhope, 7th Earl Stanhope, 13th Earl of Chesterfield (11 November 1880 – 15 August 1967), styled Viscount Mahon until 1905, was a British Conservative politician.

== Background ==
Stanhope was the eldest son of Arthur Stanhope, 6th Earl Stanhope, and Evelyn Henrietta (née Pennefather), daughter of Richard Pennefather of Knockeevan, County Tipperary, and Lady Emily Butler, daughter of the 1st Earl of Glengall. The Hon. Edward Stanhope and Philip Stanhope, 1st Baron Weardale, were his uncles.

Lord Mahon was commissioned a second lieutenant in the Grenadier Guards on 5 January 1901, and went with his battalion to serve in South Africa during the Second Boer War. Following the end of this war in June 1902, he returned with a large contingent of men from the guards regiments on board the SS Lake Michigan, which arrived in Southampton in October 1902.

== Political career ==
Stanhope entered the House of Lords on the death of his father in 1905, and made his maiden speech in November 1909. He held his first office as Parliamentary Secretary to the War Office under David Lloyd George between 1918 and 1919. In 1924 he was appointed Civil Lord of the Admiralty under Stanley Baldwin, a post he held until the Conservatives lost power in 1929. The latter year he was also sworn of the Privy Council. After the formation of the National Government in 1931 he served under Ramsay MacDonald as Parliamentary and Financial Secretary to the Admiralty in 1931, as Under-Secretary of State for War between 1931 and 1934 and as Under-Secretary of State for Foreign Affairs, the last year under the premiership of Stanley Baldwin. In 1934 he was made a Knight Companion of the Garter.

He entered the cabinet in June 1936 when Baldwin appointed him First Commissioner of Works. When Neville Chamberlain became Prime Minister in May 1937 Stanhope was made President of the Board of Education, and in February 1938 he also succeeded Edward Wood, 3rd Viscount Halifax, as Leader of the House of Lords. In October 1938 he became First Lord of the Admiralty while continuing as Leader of the House of Lords. After the outbreak of the Second World War in September 1939, he was succeeded as First Lord of the Admiralty by Winston Churchill and appointed Lord President of the Council. He remained as Leader of the House of Lords and Lord President until Churchill became Prime Minister in 1940. However, he did not serve in the Churchill coalition government and never returned to ministerial office. He made his last speech in the House of Lords in December 1960.

In July 1940, Stanhope and several other national politicians—including Baldwin and Chamberlain—were targeted in the polemic Guilty Men. This publication accused these men of failing to prepare Britain for the looming war, and of appeasing Nazi Germany during the 1930s. The accusations made in Guilty Men have subsequently been questioned by some critics.

== Family ==
Lord Stanhope married Lady Eileen Browne (1889–1940), the eldest daughter of George Browne, 6th Marquess of Sligo, and Agatha Stewart Hodgson, granddaughter of William Forsyth. They had no children. She died in September 1940, aged 51. With the death of Edward Scudamore-Stanhope, 12th Earl of Chesterfield, in 1952, Lord Stanhope inherited the peerage titles Earl of Chesterfield and Baron Stanhope, but did not apply for a writ of summons for the more senior Earldom of Chesterfield, and continued to be known as the Earl Stanhope. Stanhope died in August 1967, aged 86. On his death both earldoms and the barony of Stanhope became extinct, whereas the viscountcy of Stanhope of Mahon and the barony of Stanhope of Elvaston passed to his nearest heir, William Stanhope, 11th Earl of Harrington. Lord Stanhope left his country seat Chevening to the nation.

== Arms ==
Coat of arms of James Stanhope, 7th Earl Stanhope
Coronet A Coronet of an Earl Crest A Tower Azure issuant from the battlements a Demi Lion Or ducally crowned Gules holding between the paws a Grenade fired proper Escutcheon Quarterly Ermine and Gules Supporters Dexter: a Wolf Or ducally crowned Gules; Sinister: a Talbot Ermine Motto A Deo et rege (Latin for 'From God and the King') Orders Order of the Garter

== Notes ==
Political offices
Preceded by Frank Hodges	Civil Lord of the Admiralty; 1924–1929	Succeeded by George Hall
Preceded by Charles Ammon	Parliamentary and Financial Secretary to the Admiralty; 1931	Succeeded by Lord Stanley
Vacant	Under-Secretary of State for War; 1931–1934	Succeeded by The Lord Strathcona and Mount Royal
Preceded by Anthony Eden	Under-Secretary of State for Foreign Affairs; 1934–1936; With: Viscount Cranborne 1935–1936	Succeeded by The Earl of Plymouth
Preceded by Hon. William Ormsby-Gore	First Commissioner of Works; 1936–1937	Succeeded by Sir Philip Sassoon, Bt
Preceded by Hon. Oliver Stanley	President of the Board of Education; 1937–1938	Succeeded by The Earl De La Warr
Preceded by The Viscount Halifax	Leader of the House of Lords; 1938–1940	Succeeded by The Viscount Caldecote
Preceded by Duff Cooper	First Lord of the Admiralty; 1938–1939	Succeeded by Winston Churchill
Preceded by The Viscount Runciman of Doxford	Lord President of the Council; 1939–1940	Succeeded by Neville Chamberlain
Party political offices
Preceded by The Viscount Halifax	Leader of the Conservative Party in the House of Lords; 1938–1940	Succeeded by The Viscount Caldecote
Peerage of England
Preceded by Edward Scudamore-Stanhope	Earl of Chesterfield; 1952–1967	Extinct
Peerage of Great Britain
Preceded by Arthur Stanhope	Earl Stanhope; 1905–1967	Extinct
Preceded by Arthur Stanhope	Viscount Stanhope of Mahon; 1905–1967	Succeeded by William Stanhope
