= Earl Stanhope =

Earldom in the Peerage of Great Britain

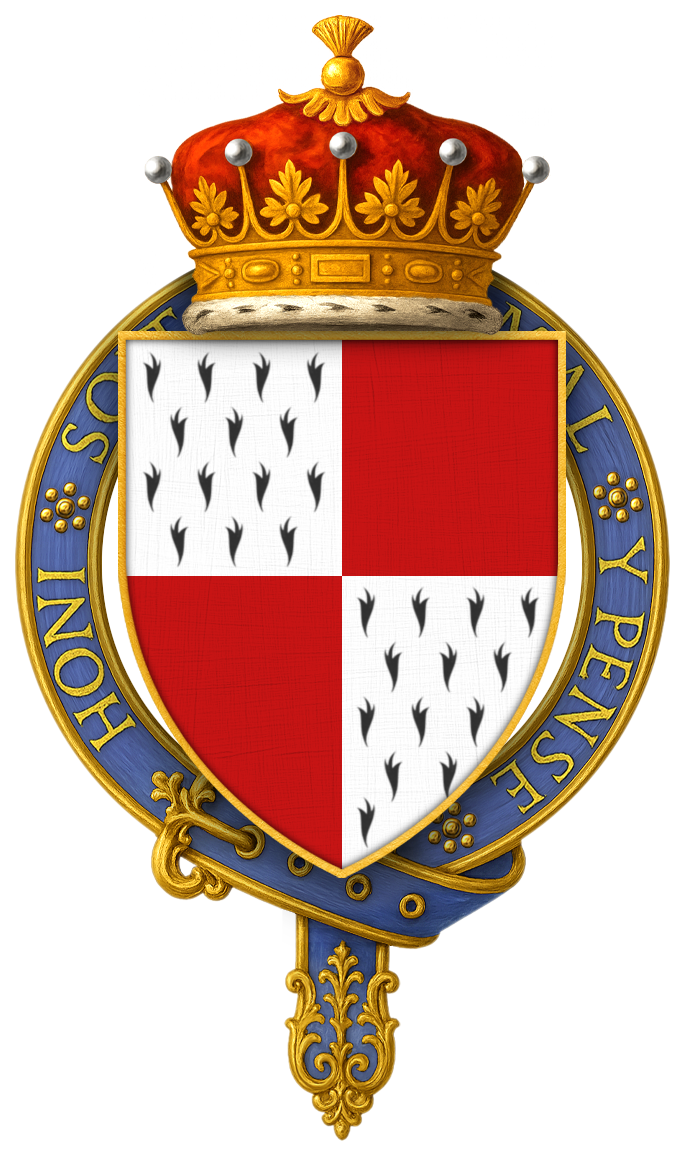
The coat of arms of James Stanhope, 7th Earl Stanhope, the final holder of the title, who died in 1967.

Earl Stanhope (/ˈstænʊp/) was a title in the Peerage of Great Britain. The earldom was created in 1718 for Major General James Stanhope, a principal minister of King George I, with remainder to the heirs male of his body. He was the son of the Hon. Alexander Stanhope, fifth and youngest son of Philip Stanhope, 1st Earl of Chesterfield. In 1717, James Stanhope had been raised to the peerage as Viscount Stanhope, of Mahón in the Island of Minorca, and Baron Stanhope, of Elvaston in the County of Derby, with special remainder, failing heirs male of his body, to his second cousin John Stanhope of Elvaston (who was the father of William Stanhope, 1st Earl of Harrington) and the heirs male of his body. These titles were also in the Peerage of Great Britain. The heir apparent of the Earls Stanhope used Viscount Mahon as a courtesy title.

== Subsequent history ==
The first Earl's grandson, the third Earl, was a politician and scientist, known as "Citizen Stanhope" because of his sympathy for the French Revolution. He was succeeded by his son, the fourth Earl. He represented several constituencies in the House of Commons but is chiefly remembered for his involvement in the Kaspar Hauser case. His son, the fifth Earl, was a Tory politician and historian. He served as Parliamentary Under-Secretary of State for Foreign Affairs and also published a biography on William Pitt the Younger. Upon his death, the titles passed to his son, the sixth Earl. He was a Conservative politician and served briefly as a Lord of the Treasury from 1874 to 1875 in Benjamin Disraeli's second administration. In addition, the sixth Earl was Lord Lieutenant of Kent.

His son, the seventh Earl, was also a Conservative politician and notably served as President of the Board of Education, as Leader of the House of Lords and as First Lord of the Admiralty. In 1952, the seventh Earl succeeded his distant relative Edward Scudamore-Stanhope, 12th Earl of Chesterfield, as thirteenth Earl of Chesterfield and 13th Baron Stanhope. However, he never applied for a writ of summons to the House of Lords in these titles and continued to be known as the Earl Stanhope. On his death in 1967, the earldoms of Stanhope and Chesterfield and the barony of Stanhope became extinct. However, he was succeeded in the viscountcy of Stanhope of Mahon and the barony of Stanhope of Elvaston according to the special remainder by his distant kinsman, William Stanhope, 11th Earl of Harrington.

Philip Stanhope, 1st Baron Weardale, was a younger son of the fifth Earl.

== Viscounts Stanhope, of Mahon (1717) ==
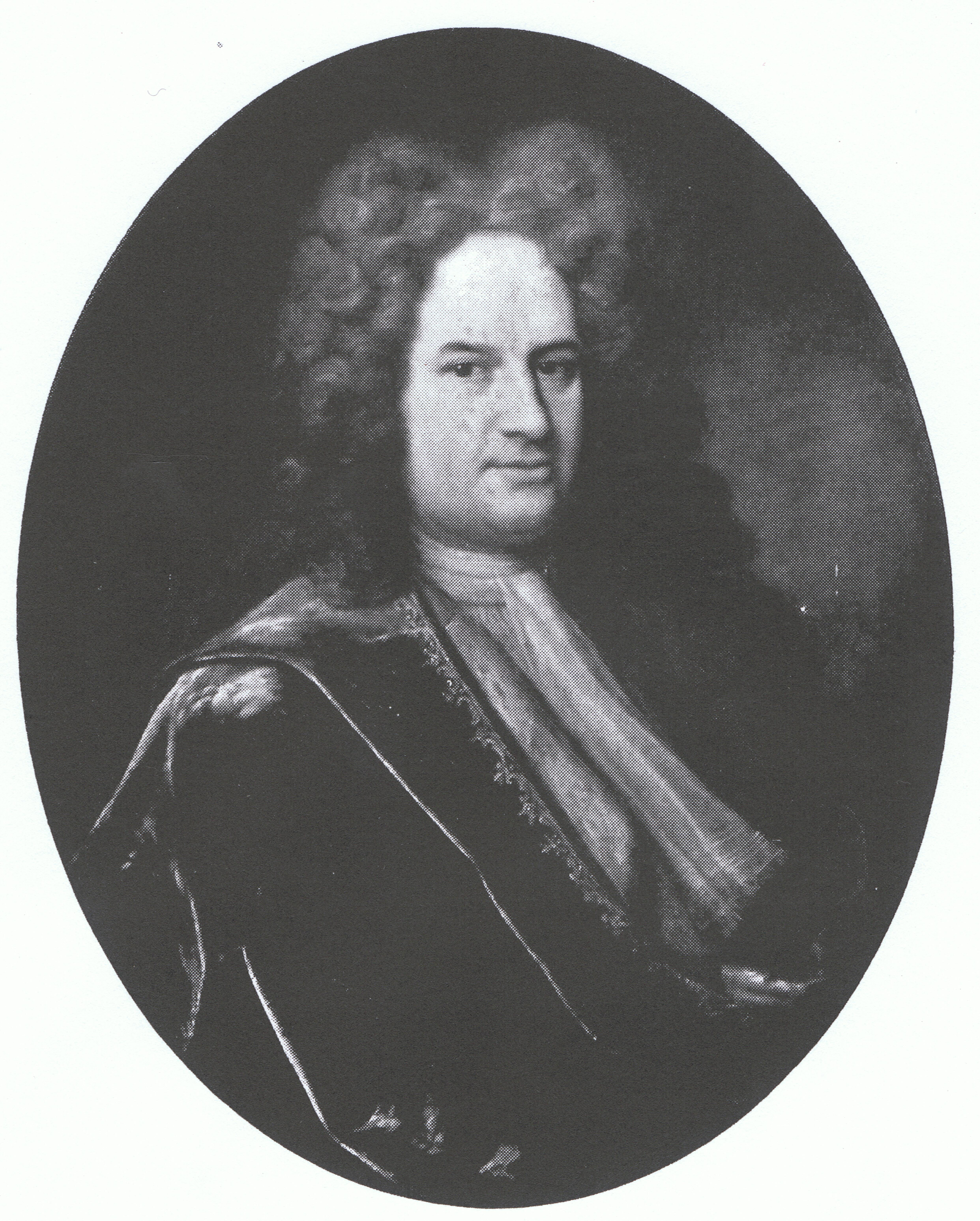
James Stanhope, 1st Earl Stanhope, from a portrait by Denner at Chevening.

- James Stanhope, 1st Viscount Stanhope (1673–1721) (created Earl Stanhope in 1718)

=== Earls Stanhope (1718) ===
- James Stanhope, 1st Earl Stanhope (1673–1721)
- Philip Stanhope, 2nd Earl Stanhope (1714–1786)
  - Philip Stanhope, Viscount Mahon (1746–1763)
- Charles Stanhope, 3rd Earl Stanhope (1753–1816)
- Philip Henry Stanhope, 4th Earl Stanhope (1781–1855)
- Philip Henry Stanhope, 5th Earl Stanhope (1805–1875)
- Arthur Philip Stanhope, 6th Earl Stanhope (1838–1905)
- James Richard Stanhope, 13th Earl of Chesterfield, 7th Earl Stanhope (1880–1967)

=== Viscount Stanhope, of Mahon (1717; reverted) ===
Following the death of the 7th Earl Stanhope and the extinction of that earldom, the titles Viscount Stanhope of Mahon and Baron Stanhope of Elvaston passed by a special remainder to his distant relative, William Stanhope, 11th Earl of Harrington.

- William Henry Leicester Stanhope, 11th Earl of Harrington, 8th Viscount Stanhope (1922–2009)
- Charles Henry Leicester Stanhope, 12th Earl of Harrington, 9th Viscount Stanhope (born 1945), son of the 11th Earl

The heir apparent is the present holder's son, William Henry Leicester Stanhope, Viscount Petersham (born 1967).
The heir apparent's heir apparent is his son, the Hon. Augustus Stanhope (born 2005).

=== Title succession chart ===
Title succession chart, Barons Stanhope, Viscounts Stanhope, and Earls Stanhope.

Baron Stanhope; Viscount Stanhope; Earl Stanhope
James Stanhope; 1st Earl Stanhope; 1673–1721
Philip Stanhope; 2nd Earl Stanhope; 1714–1786
Philip Stanhope; Viscount Mahon; 1746–1763 | Charles Stanhope; 3rd Earl Stanhope; 1753–1816
Philip Stanhope; 4th Earl Stanhope; 1781–1855
Philip Stanhope; 5th Earl Stanhope; 1805–1875
Baron Weardale
Arthur Stanhope; 6th Earl Stanhope; 1838–1905 | Hon. Edward Stanhope; 1840–1893 | Hon. Henry Stanhope; 1845–1933 | Philip Stanhope; 1st Baron Weardale; 1847–1923
Barony extinct
Inherited the earldom of Chesterfield
James Stanhope; 7th Earl Stanhope; 13th Earl of Chesterfield; 1880–1967 | Capt. Hon. Richard Stanhope; 1885–1916
Both earldoms extinct, viscountcy and barony inherited by the 11th Earl of Harrington

== Seats ==
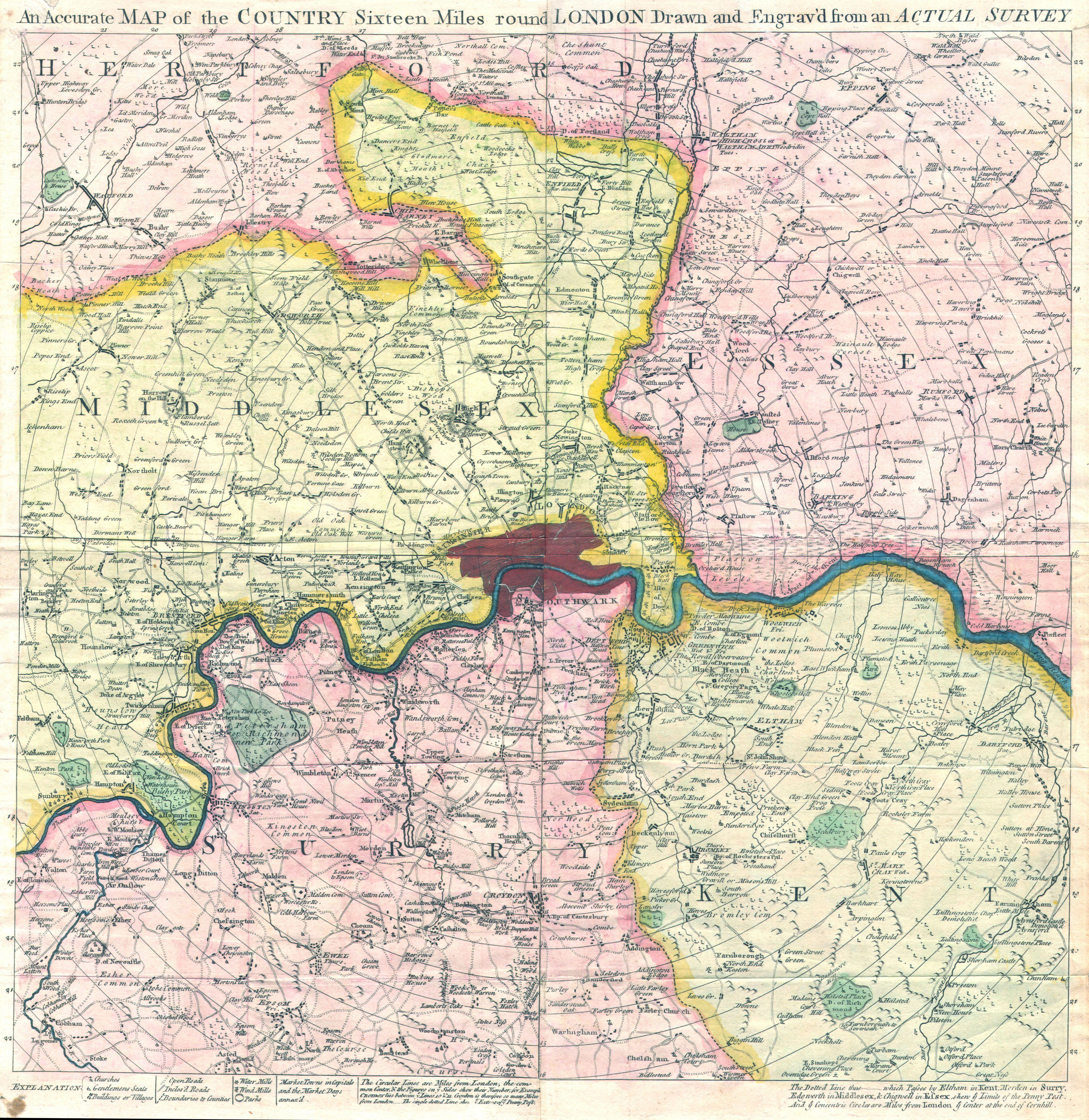
Extract from Gentleman's Magazine, Sixteen Miles Round London, 1764 (map). The words 'E. Stanhope' and 'Chevening Place' can be seen near the bottom.

Properties owned and occupied by the earls ('noble seats') included:

- Elvaston Castle, Derbyshire
- Chevening, Kent (in early years known as Chevening Place; bought by the first Earl in 1717 and left to public ministerial/recent Royal benefit by the last Earl tabling the Chevening Estate Bill 1959)

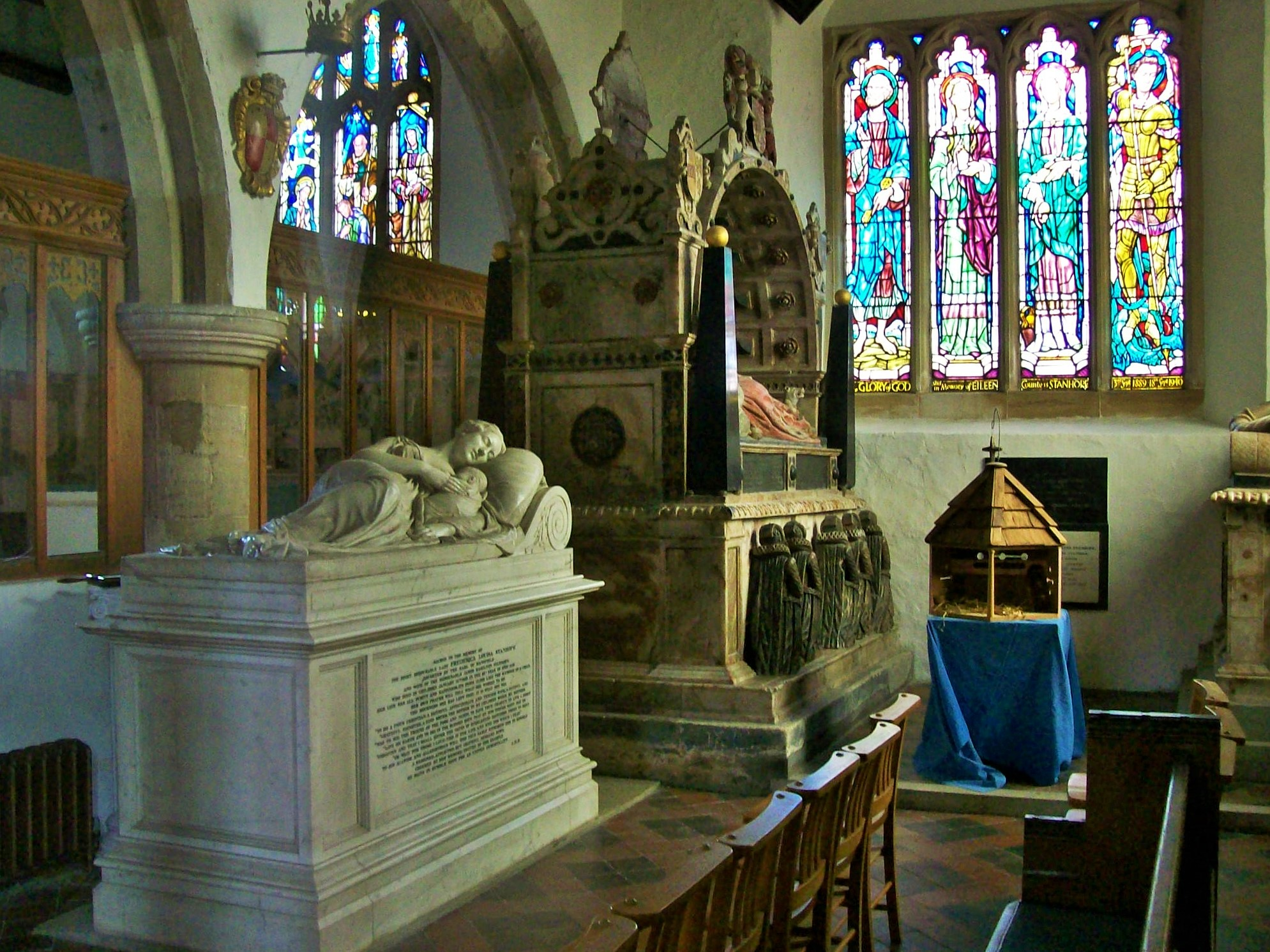
Stanhope Chapel at St Botolph's Parish Church, Chevening, Kent

The traditional burial place of the Earls Stanhope was the Stanhope Chapel in the parish church of St Botolph, Chevening, Kent.

== See also ==
- Baron Weardale
- Earl of Chesterfield
- Earl of Harrington
