= Dudley Stanhope, 9th Earl of Harrington =

British peer

- Earl of Harrington
- Coat of arms of the Earls of Harrington
- Tenure: 1917–1928
- Predecessor: Charles Stanhope, 8th Earl of Harrington (elder brother)
- Successor: Charles Stanhope, 10th Earl of Harrington (son)
- Other titles: Viscount Petersham; Baron Harrington
- Born: Dudley Henry Eden Stanhope; 13 January 1859
- Died: 13 November 1928 (aged 69)
- Residence: Elvaston Castle
- Spouse: Kathleen Wood (daughter of Joseph Carter Wood)
- Parents: Charles Stanhope, 7th Earl of Harrington; Elizabeth Still de Pearsall (daughter of Robert Lucas de Pearsall of Wartensee Castle, Switzerland)

Dudley Henry Eden Stanhope, 9th Earl of Harrington (13 January 1859 – 13 November 1928), was a British peer.

He was the son of Charles Stanhope, 7th Earl of Harrington, and Elizabeth Still de Pearsall. He succeeded in the earldom on the death of his childless brother Charles on 5 February 1917.

== Family ==
Lord Harrington married Kathleen Wood, daughter of Joseph Carter Wood, on 26 April 1883. They had three children:

- Lady Kathleen Florence Mary Stanhope
- Charles Joseph Leicester Stanhope, 10th Earl of Harrington (9 October 1887 – 16 November 1929)
- Lieutenant Talbot FitzRoy Eden Stanhope (23 November 1896 – 9 May 1915)

Lord Harrington died on 13 November 1928 at age 69.

Peerage of Great Britain
Preceded by Charles Stanhope	Earl of Harrington; 1917–1928	Succeeded by Charles Stanhope
Preceded by Charles Stanhope	Baron Harrington; 1917–1928	Succeeded by Charles Stanhope
