= Lady Margarita Armstrong-Jones =

British jewelry designer and relative of the royal family (born 2002)

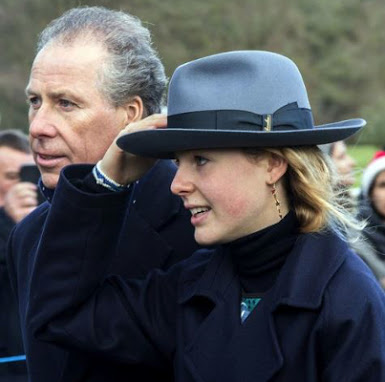
- Margarita and her father in 2017
- Born: Margarita Elizabeth Rose Alleyne Armstrong-Jones; 14 May 2002 (age 24); Portland Hospital, London, England
- Education: Garden House School; St Mary's School Ascot; Tudor Hall School; Oxford Brookes University; Haute École de Joaillerie
- Parents: David Armstrong-Jones, 2nd Earl of Snowdon (father); Serena Stanhope (mother)
- Family: Armstrong-Jones (paternal); Stanhope (maternal)

Lady Margarita Elizabeth Rose Alleyne Armstrong-Jones (born 14 May 2002) is a member of the British royal family. She is the granddaughter of Princess Margaret and the grandniece of Queen Elizabeth II. As of 2026, she is 29th in the line of succession to the British throne. Armstrong-Jones was a bridesmaid at the wedding of Prince William and Catherine Middleton in 2011 and accompanies other members of the royal family to public events. She is a jewellery designer and the creator of the bespoke jewellery label Matita. In 2023, she was the cover girl for the May issue of Tatler.

== Early life and family ==
Margarita Elizabeth Rose Alleyne Armstrong-Jones was born on 14 May 2002 at the Portland Hospital in London. She is the daughter of David Armstrong-Jones, 2nd Earl of Snowdon, who was styled as Viscount Linley at the time of her birth, and the Honourable Serena Stanhope. On her father's side, she is the granddaughter of Princess Margaret, Countess of Snowdon, and Antony Armstrong-Jones, 1st Earl of Snowdon, and a great-granddaughter of King George VI. On her mother's side, she is the granddaughter of Charles Stanhope, 12th Earl of Harrington, and a descendant of Charles II. She was named after her paternal grandmother and great-grandmother, Queen Elizabeth the Queen Mother.

Armstrong-Jones grew up at her family's three homes: a flat in Chelsea, London, a cottage on the grounds of the Daylesford Estate in Gloucestershire; and the Château d'Autet in France. As a member of the British royal family, she spends Christmases at Sandringham House and summers at Balmoral Castle.

Her father succeeded his father as Earl of Snowdon in 2017, which entitled her to use the title Lady. Armstrong-Jones's parents separated in 2020.

== Education ==
Armstrong-Jones was first educated at Garden House School, a private school in the Royal Borough of Kensington and Chelsea, before attending St Mary's School Ascot, a Catholic all-girls boarding school. She later transferred to Tudor Hall School, an all-girls boarding school in Oxfordshire, where she studied art history, jewellery design, and photography for her A-levels.

In 2020, she studied photography at Oxford Brookes University, switching for her second year to event management after the university moved its courses online due to the COVID-19 pandemic in the United Kingdom in her first year. Armstrong-Jones took life drawing, pottery, and watercolour painting courses at a small art school in Oxford.

In September 2022, Armstrong-Jones enrolled as a student at La Haute École de Joaillerie in Paris to study jewellery design, stonesetting, and wax carving.

== Public role and royal appearances ==
In 2008, Armstrong-Jones attended the wedding of Peter Phillips, son of the Princess Royal, to Autumn Kelly at St George's Chapel, Windsor, and appeared with the royal family for photographs the following day. That same year, she accompanied her aunt, Lady Sarah Chatto, to the 60th birthday brunch for Charles, Prince of Wales (later King Charles III) at the Goring Hotel.

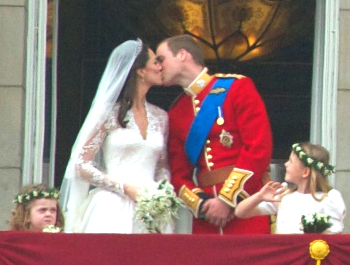
Armstrong-Jones (far right) on the balcony of Buckingham Palace after the wedding of Prince William and Catherine Middleton

In 2011, Armstrong-Jones served as a bridesmaid at the wedding of Prince William and Catherine Middleton alongside Lady Louise Windsor, Eliza Lopes, and Grace van Cutsem. Her elder brother, Charles, served as a page of honour to Elizabeth II. During the festivities, she was guided by Pippa Middleton, whom she accompanied in the carriage ride to the abbey and sat with during the church service.

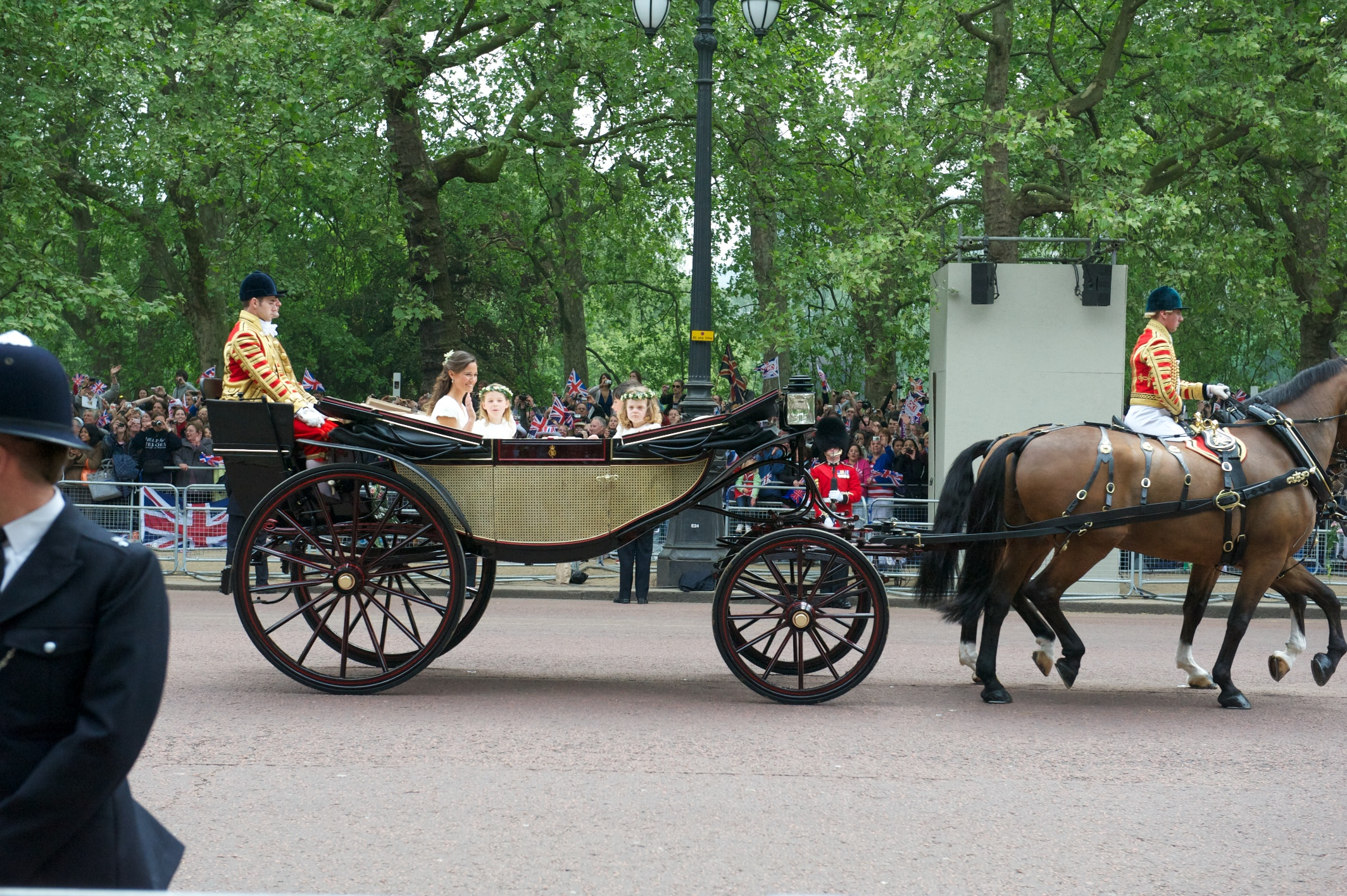
Armstrong-Jones (middle) on her way to Westminster Abbey for the wedding of Prince William and Catherine Middleton

On 30 March 2012, she attended a Service of Thanksgiving for the Queen Mother and Princess Margaret at St George's Chapel.

In 2018, Armstrong-Jones attended the wedding of Prince Harry and Meghan Markle and the wedding of Princess Eugenie and Jack Brooksbank.

Along with other members of the extended royal family, she attended the funeral of Prince Philip, Duke of Edinburgh, in 2021 and the state funeral of Elizabeth II in 2022.

Armstrong-Jones was present at the Coronation of Charles III and Camilla on 6 May 2023.

She also attends the annual Trooping the Colour, having accompanied Elizabeth II in the past.

She attends Christmas services with the royal family at St Mary Magdalene Church, Sandringham, and attended the annual Queen's Christmas Lunch at Buckingham Palace.

== Career ==
Armstrong-Jones made her modelling debut in 2011 for Kids Company. In 2022, she worked at Fiona Finds, an interior design shop on Lowndes Street, for five months. In 2023, she was the May cover girl of Tatler, photographed by Luc Braquet, and was featured in a spread in the magazine modelling couture gowns.

She is the founder and designer of Matita, a bespoke jewellery brand based in Paris. She is also a photographer and runs a photography brand called Atira.

== Personal life ==
In September 2022, Armstrong-Jones moved to Paris, renting a flat near the Bastille where she lives with her two best friends. She is a prominent socialite and attends various society events, including Tatler's annual Little Black Book party.

As of 2026, she is 29th in the line of succession to the British throne.

Lady Margarita Armstrong-Jones Born: 14 May 2002
Lines of succession
Preceded by Viscount Linley	Line of succession to the British throne 29th in line	Succeeded by Lady Sarah Chatto
