= Charles Stanhope, 12th Earl of Harrington =

Earl of Harrington in Great Britain

The Right Honourable The Earl of Harrington
- Tenure: 12 April 2009 – present
- Predecessor: William Stanhope, 11th Earl of Harrington
- Other titles: Viscount Petersham
- Born: Charles Henry Leicester Stanhope; 20 July 1945 (age 81)
- Net worth: £250 million
- Spouses: Virginia Freeman-Jackson (m. 1966; div. 1983) Anita Fuglesang (m. 1984)
- Issue: William Stanhope, Viscount Petersham; Serena Armstrong-Jones, Countess of Snowdon
- Parents: William Stanhope, 11th Earl of Harrington; Eileen Foley Grey

Charles Henry Leicester Stanhope, 12th Earl of Harrington (born 20 July 1945), styled as Viscount Petersham from birth until his father's death in 2009, is the son of William Stanhope, 11th Earl of Harrington, and his wife, Eileen Grey.

== Early life ==
Charles Henry Leicester Stanhope was born 20 July 1945 to William Stanhope, 11th Earl of Harrington, and Eileen Grey, daughter of Sir John Foley Grey, 8th Baronet. He had two older sisters, the elder of whom was Lady Jane Stanhope (1942–1974), who married Anthony Cameron and was killed in a motor accident in 1974. His second sister is Lady Avena Margaret Clare Stanhope (b. 1944), who married Adrian Maxwell.

He was educated at Aysgarth School, Newton-le-Willows, and Eton College.

== Wealth ==
He was ranked 325th in the Sunday Times Rich List 2008 with an estimated wealth of £250 million. He is the owner of some prime land in London. Though the net assets of his two main companies, Elvaston Investments and Stanhope Gardens, came in at about £5 million in 2005, his total land holdings have been valued recently at about £250 million.

== Personal life ==
He married, firstly, Virginia Freeman-Jackson (born 1939), the daughter of Captain Harry Freeman-Jackson and Dorothy d'Aubigny d'Engelbronner, on 14 September 1966, and they were divorced in 1983. They had two children and four grandchildren:

- William Henry Leicester Stanhope, Viscount Petersham and Stanhope (born 14 October 1967), who married Candida Bond on 28 April 2001. They have two children:
  - The Honourable Tirkana Stanhope (1 August 2003)
  - The Honourable Augustus Henry Stanhope (26 September 2005), Elizabeth II's second page of honour from 2015 to 2019
- Serena Armstrong-Jones, Countess of Snowdon (born 1 March 1970), who married David Armstrong-Jones, Viscount Linley (later the 2nd Earl of Snowdon), on 8 October 1993. They have two children:
  - Charles Armstrong-Jones, Viscount Linley (1 July 1999)
  - Lady Margarita Armstrong-Jones (14 May 2002)

He married, secondly, the photographer Anita Fuglesang, formerly the wife of Michael Howard, 21st Earl of Suffolk.

Peerage of Great Britain
Preceded by William Stanhope	Earl of Harrington; 2009–present	Incumbent; Heir apparent: William Stanhope, Viscount Petersham
Preceded by William Stanhope	Baron Harrington; 2009–present	Incumbent; Heir apparent: William Stanhope, Viscount Petersham
Preceded by William Stanhope	Viscount Stanhope; 2009–present	Incumbent; Heir apparent: William Stanhope, Viscount Petersham
Preceded by William Stanhope	Baron Stanhope; 2009–present	Incumbent; Heir apparent: William Stanhope, Viscount Petersham
