= Earl of Harrington =

Earldom in the Peerage of Great Britain

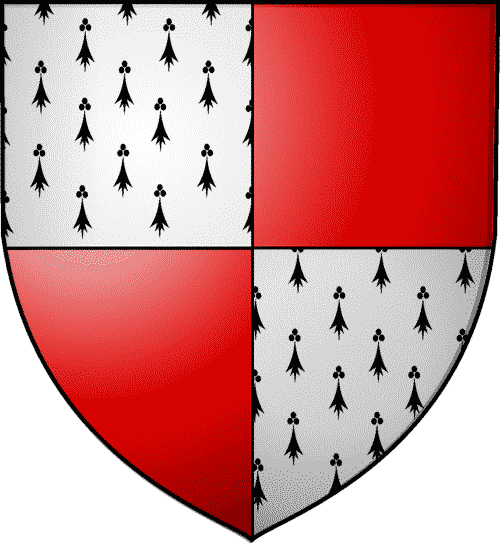
- Arms of Stanhope: Quarterly ermine and gules
- Creation date: 9 February 1742
- Created by: King George II
- Peerage: Peerage of Great Britain
- First holder: William Stanhope, 1st Baron Harrington
- Present holder: Charles Stanhope, 12th Earl of Harrington
- Heir apparent: William Stanhope, Viscount Petersham
- Remainder to: the first Earl's heirs male of the body lawfully begotten
- Subsidiary titles: Viscount Petersham; Viscount Stanhope, of Mahon; Baron Harrington; Baron Stanhope, of Elvaston
- Former seats: Elvaston Castle; Harrington House; Gawsworth Hall
- Motto: A Deo et rege (Latin for 'From God and the King')

Earl of Harrington is a title in the Peerage of Great Britain that was created in 1742.

== History ==
The earldom of Harrington was granted in 1742 to William Stanhope, 1st Baron Harrington, the former Secretary of State and then Lord President of the Council. He was made Viscount Petersham at the same time. In 1730, he had been created Baron Harrington, of Harrington in the County of Northampton. These titles were also in the Peerage of Great Britain. Lord Harrington was the son of John Stanhope of Elvaston and the great-grandson of Sir John Stanhope of Elvaston, younger half-brother of Philip Stanhope, 1st Earl of Chesterfield (who was the grandfather of James Stanhope, 1st Earl Stanhope).

Lord Harrington was succeeded by his son William, the second Earl. He was a general in the Army and also represented Bury St Edmunds in the House of Commons. His son, the third Earl, was also a general in the Army and sat as Member of Parliament for Thetford and Westminster. His elder son, the fourth Earl, and younger son, the fifth Earl, were both Colonels in the Army.

The line of the fifth Earl failed in 1866 upon the early death of his son, the sixth Earl. The latter was succeeded by his first cousin, the seventh Earl. He was the son of the Very Reverend and Hon. FitzRoy Henry Richard, fourth son of the third Earl. His elder son, the eighth Earl, was a successful polo player. He was succeeded by his younger brother, the ninth Earl. His grandson, the eleventh Earl, succeeded his father in 1929.

In 1967, the eleventh Earl also succeeded as eighth Viscount Stanhope (of Mahon) and eighth Baron Stanhope (of Elvaston) upon the death of his distant relative James Stanhope, 7th Earl Stanhope, by a special remainder in these titles' patent that allowed them to be inherited by the male heirs of the aforementioned John Stanhope, father of the first Earl of Harrington. As of 2016, the titles are held by the eleventh Earl's son, the twelfth Earl, who succeeded his father in 2009.

The former family seat was Elvaston Castle, in Derbyshire. The house and grounds are currently owned by Derbyshire County Council, which has opened the gardens as a country park. The 5th Earl had a London townhouse built on land formerly belonging to Kensington Palace – Harrington House remained in the family until the First World War. It is currently home to the Russian Embassy.

Serena Armstrong-Jones, Countess of Snowdon, wife of the 2nd Earl of Snowdon, nephew of Queen Elizabeth II and a member of the extended British royal family, is the daughter of the 12th Earl of Harrington.

== Baron Harrington (1730) ==
- William Stanhope, 1st Baron Harrington (1683–1756) (created Earl of Harrington in 1742)

=== Earl of Harrington (1742) ===
- William Stanhope, 1st Earl of Harrington (1683–1756)
- William Stanhope, 2nd Earl of Harrington (1719–1779), son of the 1st Earl
- Charles Stanhope, 3rd Earl of Harrington (1753–1829), son of the 2nd Earl
- Charles Stanhope, 4th Earl of Harrington (1780–1851), son of the 3rd Earl
  - Charles Stanhope, Viscount Petersham (1831–1836)
- Leicester FitzGerald Charles Stanhope, 5th Earl of Harrington (1784–1862), brother of the 4th Earl, son of the 3rd Earl
- Sydney Seymour Hyde Stanhope, 6th Earl of Harrington (1845–1866), son of the 5th Earl
- Charles Wyndham Stanhope, 7th Earl of Harrington (1809–1881), first cousin of the 6th Earl, grandson of the 3rd Earl
- Charles Augustus Stanhope, 8th Earl of Harrington (1844–1917), son of the 7th Earl
- Dudley Henry Eden Stanhope, 9th Earl of Harrington (1859–1928), brother of the 8th Earl, son of the 7th Earl
- Charles Joseph Leicester Stanhope, 10th Earl of Harrington (1887–1929), son of the 9th Earl
- William Henry Leicester Stanhope, 11th Earl of Harrington (1922–2009), son of the 10th Earl
- Charles Henry Leicester Stanhope, 12th Earl of Harrington (born 1945), son of the 11th Earl

The heir apparent is the present holder's son, William Henry Leicester Stanhope, Viscount Petersham (born 1967).
Lady Petersham (Candida Bond) is a Deputy Lieutenant of Aberdeenshire. The heir apparent's heir apparent is his son, the Hon. Augustus Stanhope (born 2005).

=== Title succession chart ===
Title succession chart, Barons Harrington and Earls of Harrington.

Baron Harrington; Earl of Harrington
William Stanhope; 1st Earl of Harrington; 1st Baron Harrington; 1683–1756
William Stanhope; 2nd Earl of Harrington; 1719–1779
Charles Stanhope; 3rd Earl of Harrington; 1753–1829
Charles Stanhope; 4th Earl of Harrington; 1780–1851	Maj.Gen. Hon. Lincoln Stanhope; 1781–1840	Leicester Stanhope; 5th Earl of Harrington; 1784–1862	Hon. William Stanhope; 1785–1786	Rev. Hon. FitzRoy Stanhope; 1787–1864
Charles Stanhope; Viscount Petersham; 1831–1836	Algernon Stanhope; 1838–1847	Sydney Stanhope; 6th Earl of Harrington; 1845–1866	Charles Stanhope; 7th Earl of Harrington; 1809–1881
Charles Stanhope; 8th Earl of Harrington; 1844–1917	Hon. FitzRoy Stanhope; 1845–1913	Hon. Lincoln Stanhope; 1849–1902	Hon. Wyndham Stanhope; 1851–1883	Dudley Stanhope; 9th Earl of Harrington; 1859–1928
Charles Stanhope; 10th Earl of Harrington; 1887–1929
Charles Stanhope; 1921–1921	William Stanhope; 11th Earl of Harrington; 1922–2009
Charles Stanhope; 12th Earl of Harrington born 1945
William Stanhope; Viscount Petersham born 1967
Augustus Stanhope born 2005

== Gallery ==
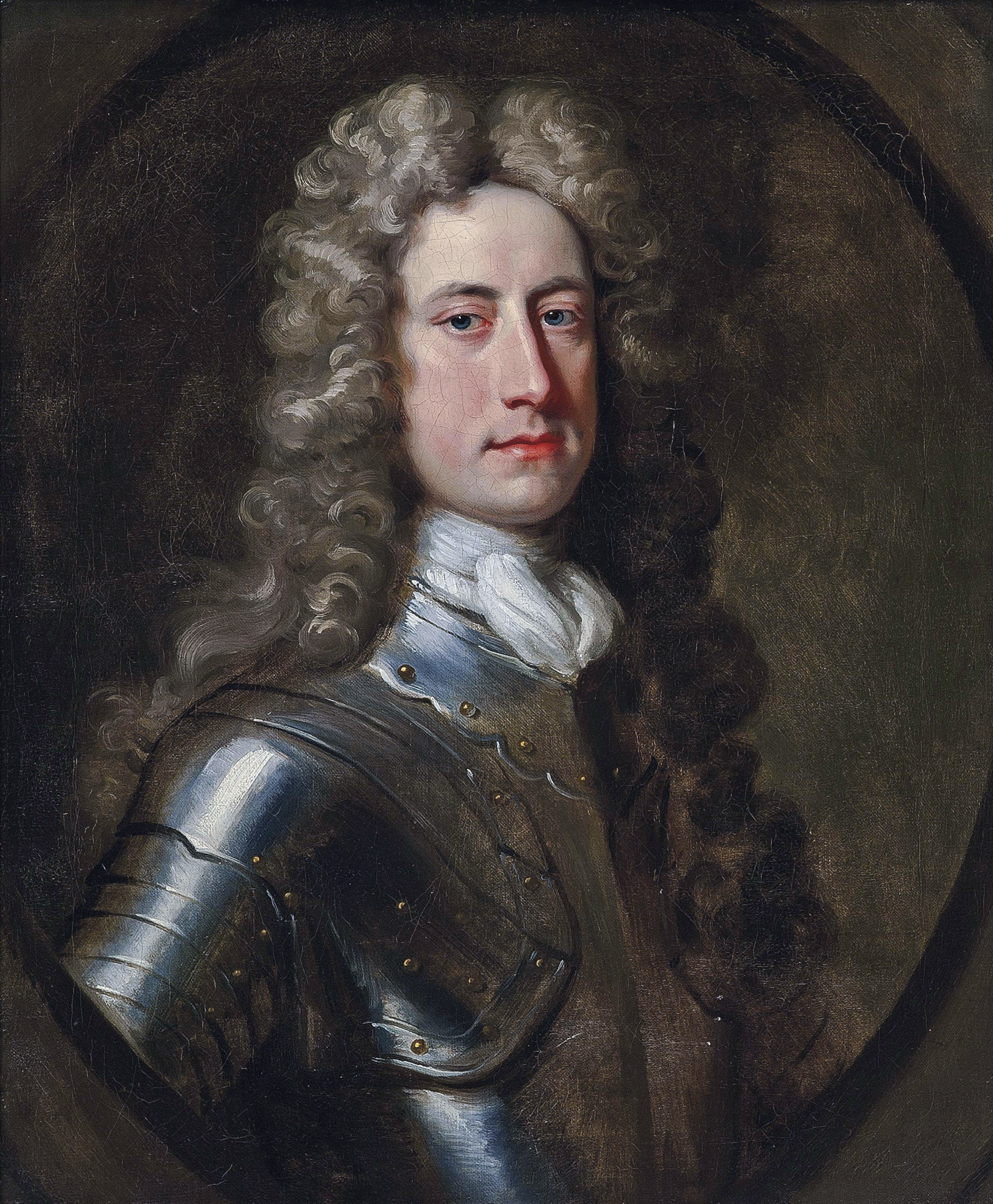
William Stanhope, 1st Earl of Harrington

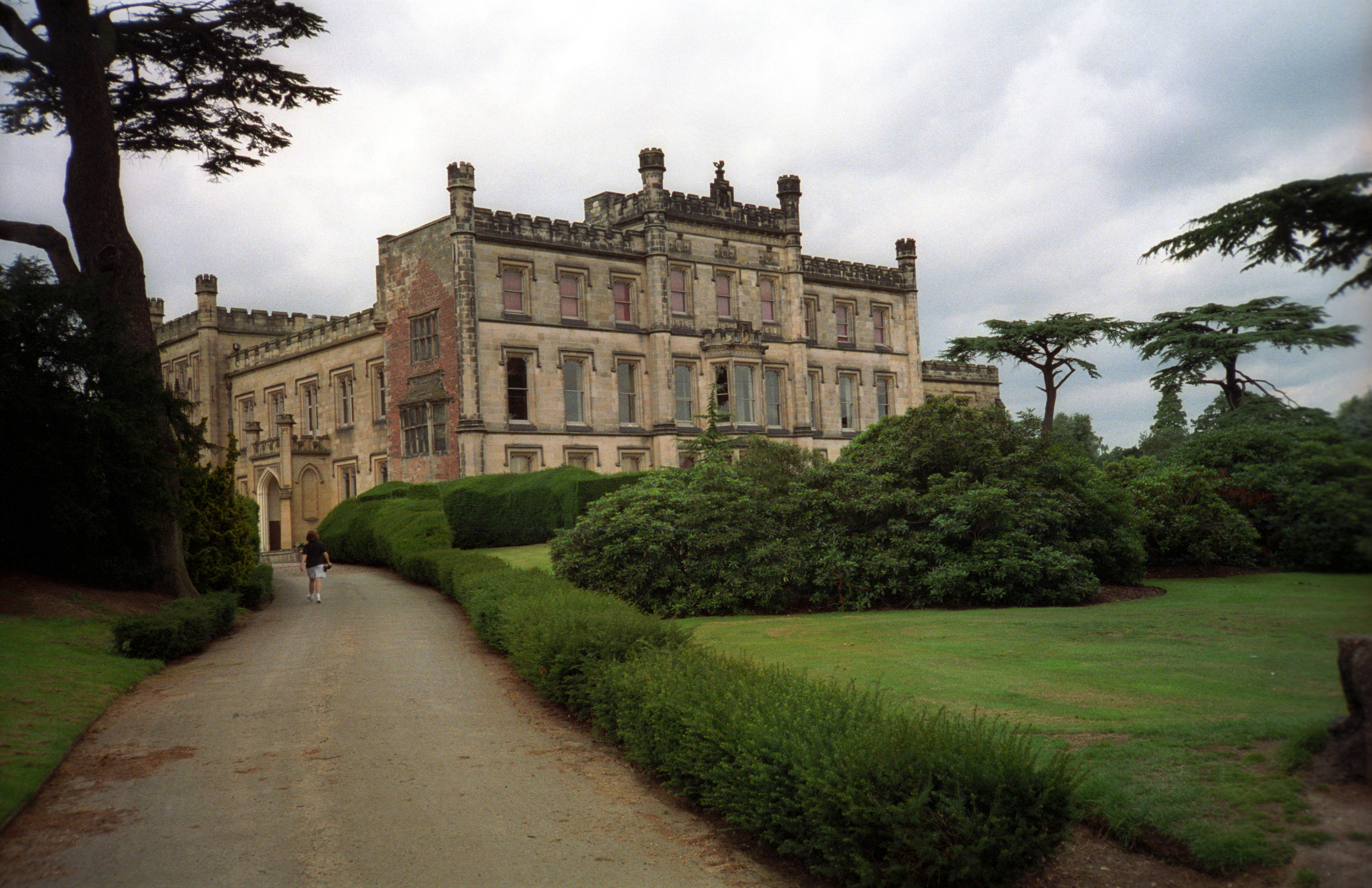
Elvaston Castle in 1992

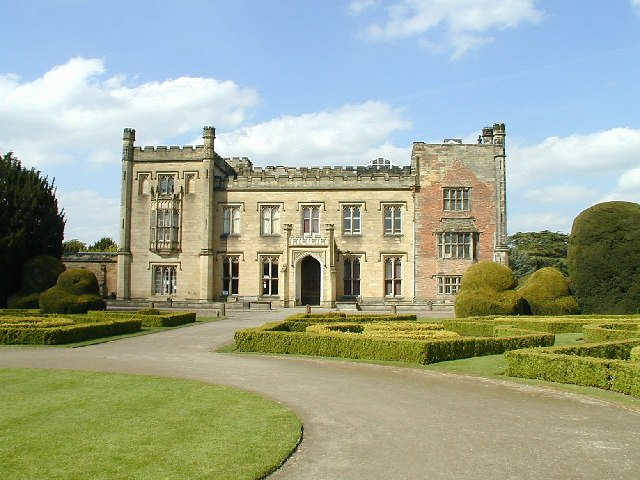
Elvaston Castle in 2005

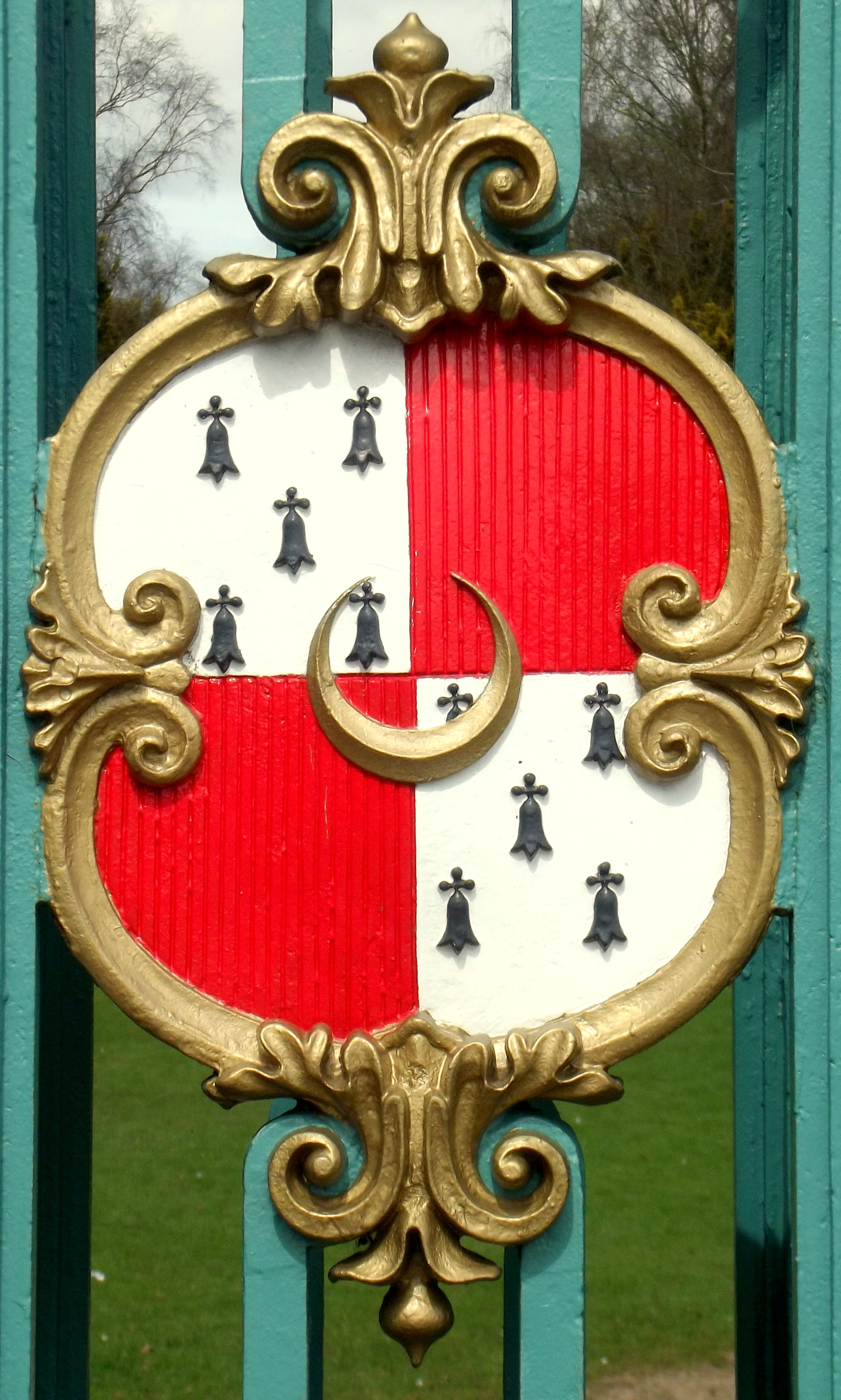
Arms of Stanhope, Earls of Harrington (with a crescent or for difference), displayed on the gates of Elvaston Castle

== See also ==
- Earl of Chesterfield
- Earl Stanhope
- Baron Stanhope
