= Lyall Street =

Street in Belgravia, London

Coordinates: 51.4959°N 0.1543°W

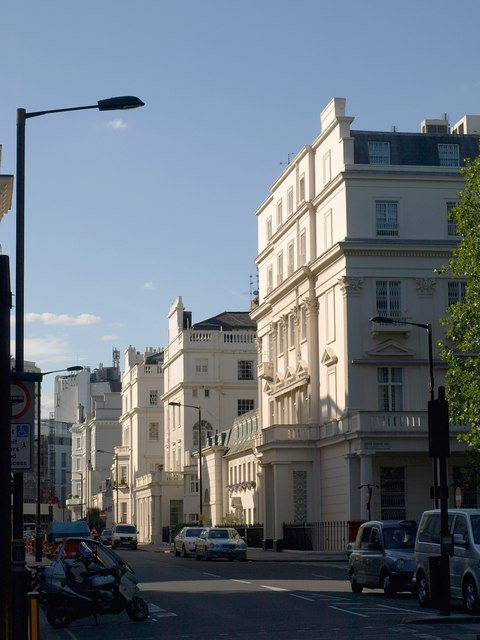
The north side of the street, seen here from across Eaton Square

Lyall Street is a street in Belgravia, London, in the City of Westminster.

It runs south from Chesham Place to Eaton Square, where it continues as Elizabeth Street and is part of the Grosvenor Estate, built on land owned by the Duke of Westminster.

Lyall Street was built in 1838 by master builder Thomas Cubitt, who had his headquarters at 3-4 Lyall Street. It was named after Charles Lyall, trustee of the Lowndes Estate.

John Aspinall lived at No. 1 Lyall Street.
