= Serena Armstrong-Jones, Countess of Snowdon =

British aristocrat, former daughter-in-law to Princess Margaret

The Right Honourable The Countess of Snowdon
- Born: Serena Alleyne Stanhope; 1 March 1970 (age 56); Limerick, Ireland
- Noble family: Stanhope (by birth)
- Spouse: David Armstrong-Jones, 2nd Earl of Snowdon (m. 1993; sep. 2020)
- Issue: Charles Armstrong-Jones, Viscount Linley; Lady Margarita Armstrong-Jones
- Parents: Charles Stanhope, 12th Earl of Harrington; Virginia Freeman-Jackson
- Education: St Mary's School, Wantage

Serena Alleyne Armstrong-Jones, Countess of Snowdon (née Stanhope; born 1 March 1970) is a British aristocrat. She is the estranged wife of David Armstrong-Jones, 2nd Earl of Snowdon.

== Early life and education ==
She was born The Honourable Serena Alleyne Stanhope in Limerick, Ireland, the daughter of the then Viscount Petersham and his wife Virginia Freeman-Jackson, a socialite and daughter of Captain Harry Freeman-Jackson and Dorothy Alleyne d'Aubigny d'Engelbronner. Her parents divorced when she was 13 years old. She has one elder brother. Through her father she is a descendant of Henry FitzRoy, 1st Duke of Grafton, an illegitimate son of King Charles II of England.

She spent most of her childhood between Chelsea (with her father and his girlfriend, later wife, Anita Howard, Countess of Suffolk) and Monaco (with her mother). She went to St Mary's School, Wantage, where she was described as being "more interested in lacrosse than Latin". After leaving St Mary's School, she went on to study art in Italy. She also attended a finishing school in Switzerland.

== Career ==
In 1989, Armstrong-Jones joined Sotheby's as a trainee. She then worked as a publicist for Giorgio Armani until August 1993, two months before her wedding. She subsequently had her own shop called 'Serena Linley Provence'. The store closed in 2014.

== Marriage and children ==
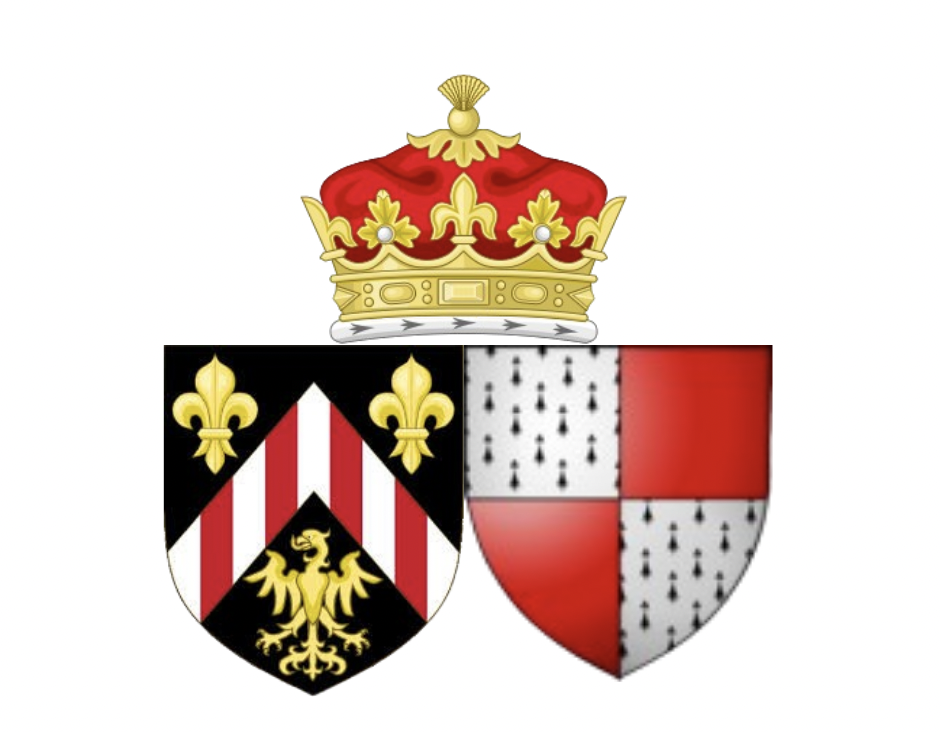
Coat of arms of David Armstrong-Jones, 2nd Earl of Snowdon & Serena Armstrong-Jones, Countess of Snowdon

On 8 October 1993, she married David Armstrong-Jones (then known as Viscount Linley), – the only son of Princess Margaret, a nephew of Queen Elizabeth II, and first cousin of King Charles III – at St Margaret's Church, Westminster. They had met when her father commissioned Linley to design a walnut dining table for his Chelsea house.

There were 650 guests in attendance at the wedding, including Elton John, Jerry Hall, the Aga Khan, and Constantine II of Greece. In addition, there were an estimated 5,000 spectators in the streets. She wore a $9,000 dress designed by Bruce Robbins, noted for its resemblance to Princess Margaret's 1960 Norman Hartnell wedding dress, and the 'Lotus Tiara', which was on loan from her mother-in-law, Princess Margaret. Her going-away outfit was designed by Robinson Valentine.

They have two children together:

- Charles Patrick Inigo Armstrong-Jones, Viscount Linley (born 1 July 1999 at Portland Hospital in London), a former page of honour to Queen Elizabeth II.
- Lady Margarita Elizabeth Rose Alleyne Armstrong-Jones (born 14 May 2002 at Portland Hospital in London).

When Viscount Linley became the Earl of Snowdon on the death of his father in 2017, she became the Countess of Snowdon.

In February 2020, she and the Earl of Snowdon separated.

== Bibliography ==
- Montague-Smith, P. (editor). (1979). Debrett's Peerage and Baronetage

Orders of precedence in the United Kingdom
Preceded by The Duchess of Gloucester	Ladies; The Countess of Snowdon	Succeeded by Princess Michael of Kent
