= William Stanhope, 1st Earl of Harrington =

British army officer, politician and diplomat

General The Right Honourable The Earl of Harrington PC
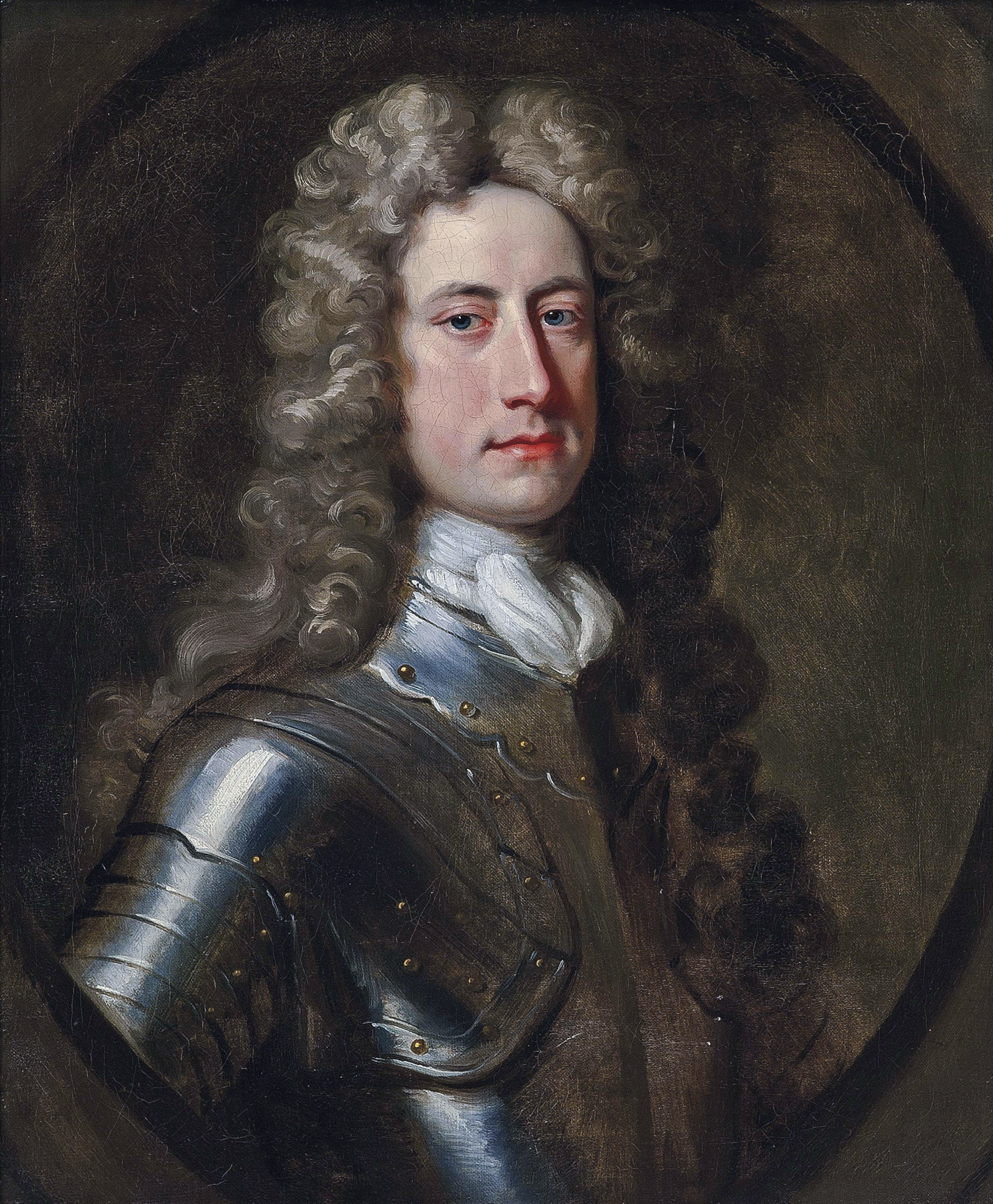
- Portrait by Sir Godfrey Kneller

Secretary of State for the Northern Department
- In office 24 November 1744 – 29 October 1746
- Monarch: George II
- Prime Minister: Henry Pelham
- Preceded by: The Earl Granville
- Succeeded by: The Earl of Chesterfield
- In office 19 June 1730 – 12 February 1742
- Monarch: George II
- Prime Minister: Robert Walpole
- Preceded by: The Viscount Townshend
- Succeeded by: The Lord Carteret

Lord Lieutenant of Ireland
- In office 15 November 1746 – 15 December 1750
- Monarch: George II
- Prime Minister: Henry Pelham
- Preceded by: The Earl of Chesterfield
- Succeeded by: The Duke of Dorset

Lord President of the Council
- In office 13 February 1742 – 3 January 1745
- Monarch: George II
- Prime Minister: The Earl of Wilmington; Henry Pelham
- Preceded by: The Earl of Wilmington
- Succeeded by: The Duke of Dorset

Personal details
- Born: William Stanhope c. 1683 Elvaston, Derbyshire
- Died: 8 December 1756 (aged 72–73) London, England
- Spouse: Anne Griffith
- Parent(s): John Stanhope; Dorothy Agard

William Stanhope, 1st Earl of Harrington (c. 1683 – 8 December 1756), was a British army officer, politician and diplomat.

== Life ==
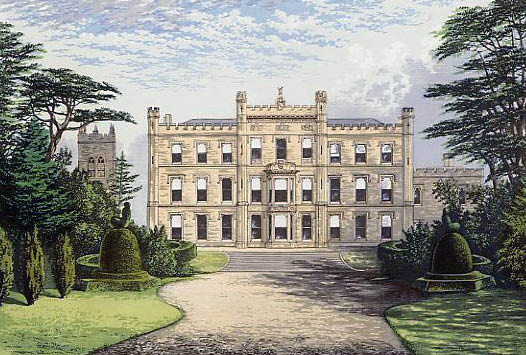
Family home in Elvaston, Derbyshire, late 19th century

William Stanhope was born in 1683 at the family home in Elvaston, Derbyshire, third surviving son of John Stanhope and Dorothy Agard. His elder brother Charles Stanhope (1673–1760) was also a politician and deeply involved in the South Sea Company financial scandal, while his cousin James Stanhope (1673–1721) is considered an alternative candidate to Robert Walpole for the title of Britain's first Prime Minister.

He married Anne Griffiths, who died in 1719 giving birth to twin sons, William, 2nd Earl of Harrington (1719–1779), and Thomas (1719–1743).

== Career ==
Educated at Eton College, Stanhope was commissioned in 1703 as a lieutenant in the 2nd Foot Guards during the War of the Spanish Succession, before transferring to the 3rd Foot Guards in Spain. By 1710, he was a lieutenant-colonel and missed the December 1710 Battle of Brihuega, when the British rearguard under his cousin James Stanhope was cut off and forced to surrender. In March 1711, he became Colonel of the former Lepells Regiment, which was disbanded in November 1712 as the army was cut back in the run-up to the 1713 Peace of Utrecht.

Stanhope was serving as a diplomat in Spain when the War of the Quadruple Alliance began in 1719 and joined the French army under the Duke of Berwick as a volunteer. He accompanied Berwick's army during its successful Siege of San Sebastian. When the war ended in 1720, Stanhope was appointed British ambassador to Spain and given the Colonelcy of the 13th Light Dragoons, later 13th Hussars; he retained this position until the Anglo-Spanish War began in March 1727, having built up his reputation as a diplomatist during a difficult period.

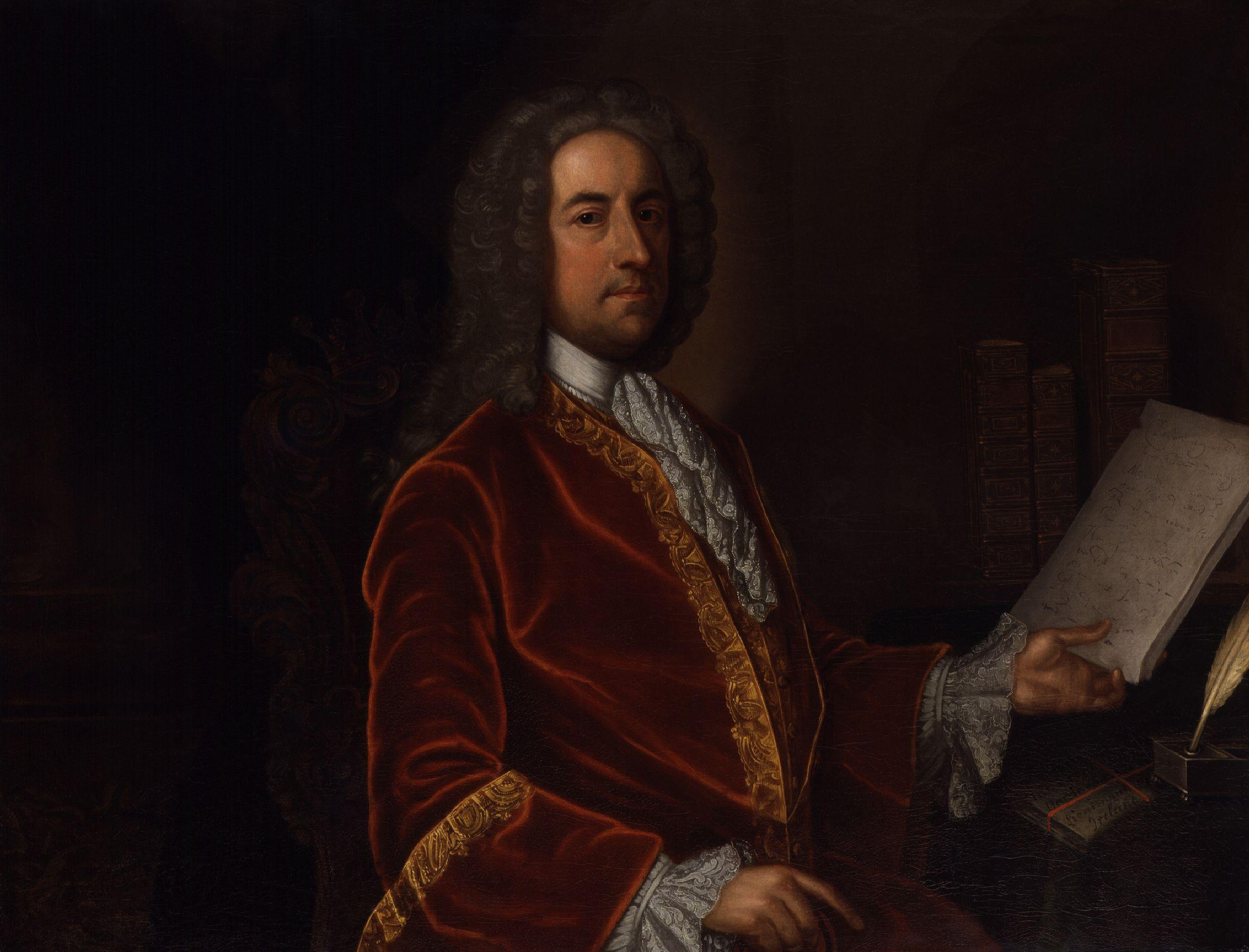
William Stanhope, 1st Earl of Harrington

As a reward for his part in negotiating the 1729 Treaty of Seville that ended the war, he was created Baron Harrington in January 1730. Later the same year, he replaced Lord Townshend as Secretary of State for the Northern Department under Robert Walpole. Despite policy differences over British involvement in the 1734–1735 war, he kept his position until Walpole's fall in 1742, when he became Lord President of the Council and created Earl of Harrington and Viscount Petersham.

With the support of his political ally the Duke of Newcastle, he was restored as Secretary of State in 1744 but resigned in October 1746 over his preference for an immediate end to the 1740–1748 War of the Austrian Succession. He was made Lord Lieutenant of Ireland from 1747 to 1751 and while his active military career finished in 1720, he received a number of promotions, ending a full General in 1747. He died in London on 8 December 1756.

Coat of arms of the Earl of Harrington

== Sources ==
- Adjutant General's Office (1842). Historical Records of the British Army; History of the 13th Light Dragoons. John W Parker.
- Pearce, William (2007). The Great Man: Sir Robert Walpole: Scoundrel, Genius and Britain's First Prime Minister. Jonathan Cape. ISBN 978-0224071819.
- Woodfine, Philip (2004). "Stanhope, William, first earl of Harrington". Oxford Dictionary of National Biography (online ed.). Oxford University Press. doi:10.1093/ref:odnb/26257. (Subscription, Wikipedia Library access or UK public library membership required.)

Parliament of Great Britain
Preceded by Edward Mundy; Nathaniel Curzon	Member of Parliament for Derby; 1715–1722; With: Lord James Cavendish	Succeeded by Lord James Cavendish; Thomas Bayley
Preceded by John Gumley; Marquess of Carnarvon	Member of Parliament for Steyning; 1727; With: John Gumley	Succeeded by The Viscount Vane; Thomas Bladen
Preceded by Lord James Cavendish; Thomas Bayley	Member of Parliament for Derby; 1727–1730; With: Lord James Cavendish	Succeeded by Lord James Cavendish; Charles Stanhope
Military offices
Preceded by Sir Robert Rich	Colonel of Harrington's Regiment of Dragoons; 1725–1730	Succeeded by Henry Hawley
Diplomatic posts
Vacant War of the Quadruple Alliance Title last held by John Chetwynd	British Ambassador to Spain; 1721–1727	Succeeded by Benjamin Keene
Political offices
Preceded by Thomas Coke	Vice-Chamberlain of the Household; 1727–1730	Succeeded by Lord Hervey
Preceded by The Duke of Devonshire	Northern Secretary; 1730–1742	Succeeded by The Lord Carteret
Preceded by The Earl of Wilmington	Lord President of the Council; 1742–1745	Succeeded by The Duke of Dorset
Preceded by The Lord Carteret	Northern Secretary; 1744–1746	Succeeded by The Earl of Chesterfield
Preceded by The Earl of Chesterfield	Lord Lieutenant of Ireland; 1746–1751	Succeeded by The Duke of Dorset
Peerage of Great Britain
New creation	Earl of Harrington; 1742–1756	Succeeded by William Stanhope
New creation	Baron Harrington; 1730–1756	Succeeded by William Stanhope
