= 13 Kensington Palace Gardens =

Former London townhouse of the Earls of Harrington

- Official Residence of the Russian Ambassador to the United Kingdom
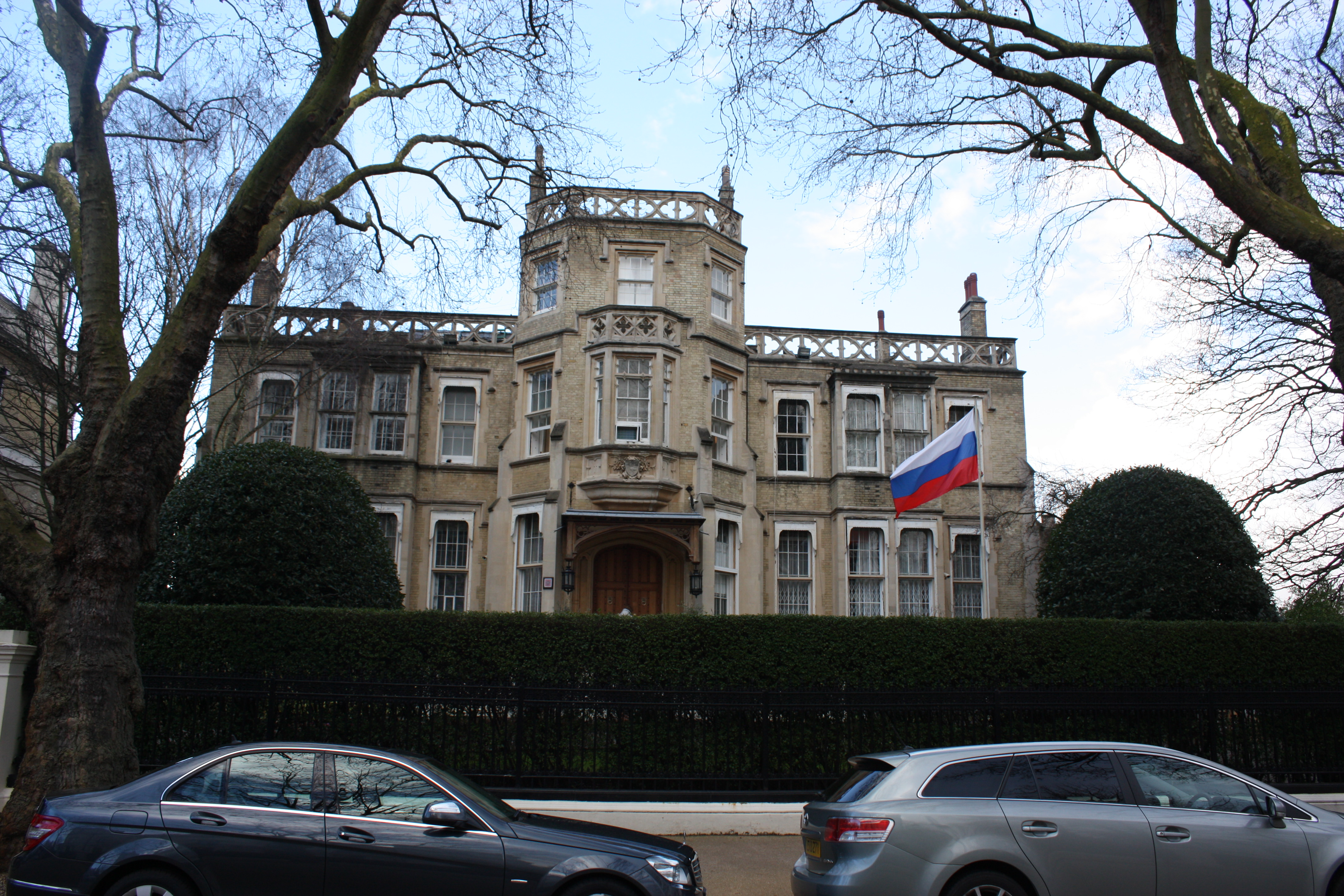
- View of the house in 2014

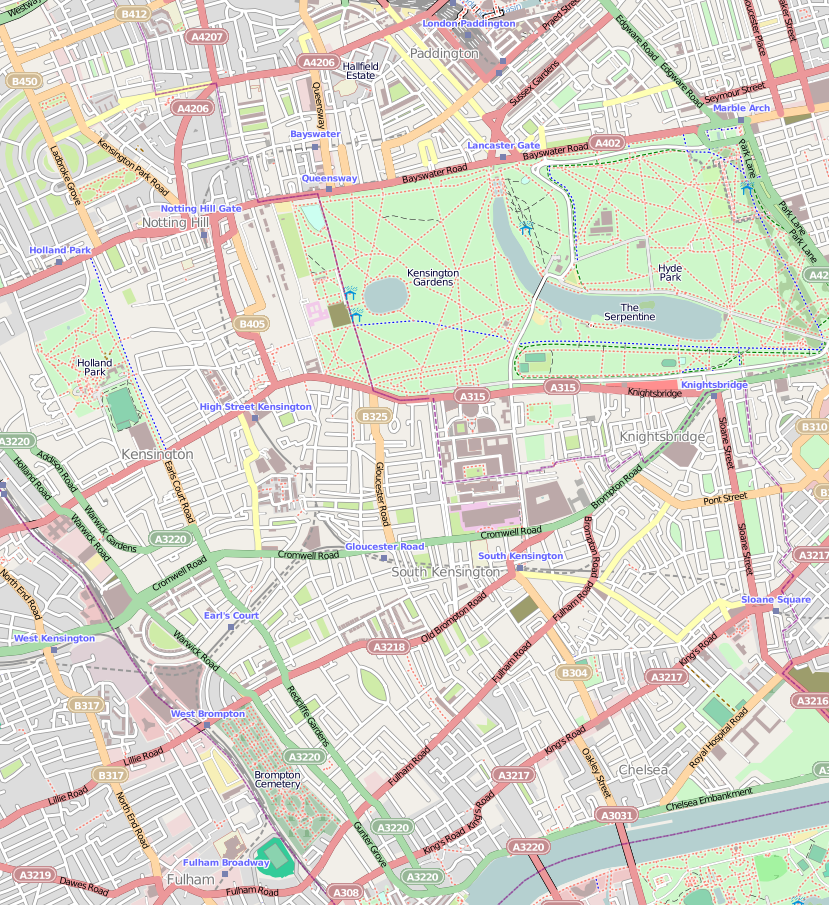
- Location within Kensington
- Former names: Harrington House

General information
- Architectural style: Unconventional Gothic
- Location: 13 Kensington Palace Gardens, Kensington, London, United Kingdom
- Coordinates: 51.507127°N 0.190638°W
- Current tenants: Russian Ambassador
- Construction started: 1851
- Renovated: 1924
- Cost: Original construction cost: £15,000 (c.1850s)
- Renovation cost: £25,000 (c.1924)
- Client: Leicester Stanhope, 5th Earl of Harrington
- Owner: The Crown

13 Kensington Palace Gardens, also known as Harrington House, is the former London townhouse of the Earls of Harrington. It is now the official residence of the Russian Ambassador. There were earlier Harrington Houses in London, located at Craig's Court, Charing Cross and at Stable Yard, St James's.

== Earls of Harrington ==
=== Construction ===
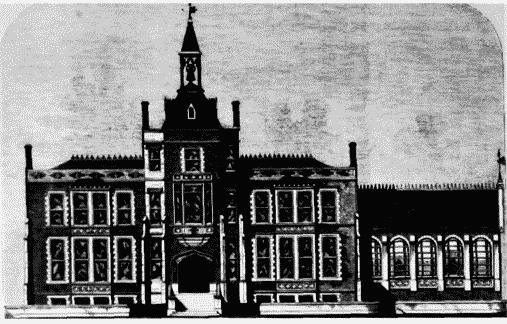
Front view of Harrington House, 1852

The land on which Harrington House is constructed previously belonged to the gardens of Kensington Palace. In 1841, an Act of Parliament allowed 28 acres of the palace's kitchen garden to be divided from the palace's gardens; two rows of "rich private residences" were then constructed on this street, which would come to be known as Kensington Palace Gardens.

No. 13, Harrington House, was constructed for Leicester Stanhope, 5th Earl of Harrington, who is described as "an important landowner in South Kensington". Lord Harrington had applied for permission to build in March 1851. He was granted the lease of the plot until 1942 (91 years), for a rent of £147 a year, on condition that before January 1853, he construct a house costing no less than £6,000. Construction began in October 1851 and by July 1853, the Earl was living at the house.

=== Critical appraisal ===
Harrington House was one of the largest houses on the road and was constructed in the Earl's favourite Gothic style; it cost around £15,000 to construct. The exterior of the house was designed by Decimus Burton, following plans sketched by the Earl. Works were carried out under the supervision of Charles James Richardson, who was the surveyor to the Earl's South Kensington estate. Details and the final plans are thought to have been left to Richardson; he did, however, acknowledge the "great measure" the Earl was involved in the design.

Richardson was not entirely complimentary of the Earl's contributions, pointing out that the flat outline of the building and low roofs were not usually part of the Gothic style. He also criticised the windows, complaining they were "more eccentric than beautiful" and blasting the use of "common sash frames". Richardson also moaned that despite the Earl spending over double what he was required to, he spent as little as possible on decoration, leading to an interior that was "very plain".

Richardson's criticisms were by no means isolated; contemporary publications lambasted the house for being "by no means elegant" and "somewhat German in character". One particularly harsh criticism stated: "Were I to express my opinion of it without reserve, I should be compelled to make use of language and epithets which, however justly merited, would be deemed as illiberal as they would be disagreeable... Instead of "repose" we have actual torture — the very thumbscrew of design."

Richardson did however defend the building's "convenience, comfort and complete suitability for all domestic purposes". Lord Harrington seems to have been happy with his house, thanking Richardson for building him "a house without a fault".

=== Appearance and layout ===
The house is built using "buff-coloured bricks with Bath stone dressings" and has a symmetrical front facade. The house has two principal stories, a ground level "part storey" (which originally contained the female servants' quarters), and a 14-foot high fireproof basement which extended under the courtyard to the rear of the house. The front entrance of the house is a three-storey tower, originally topped with a bell-turret demolished in the 1920s. Above the front entrance is an oriel window and quatrefoil parapet. To the south, the house has a conservatory.

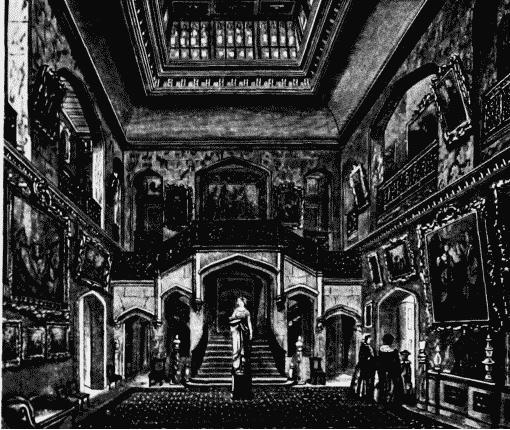
The saloon, 1870

From the front door there was a small entrance hall, with a library and dining room either side. The entrance hall led to the saloon, at the centre of the house, which was two storeys high and topped by a skylight incorporating "embossed and coloured glass" featuring "shields, coats of arms, mottoes and monograms". The saloon originally contained a stone staircase which was replaced with a double oak one in 1924. Also in 1924, the saloon was redecorated in oak panelling, and cantilevered landings added around three sides of the second storey of the room. The saloon was flanked by a serving room (adjacent to the dining room), a dressing room, the second (servants') staircase, and a waiting room.

The saloon led onto a large picture gallery at the back of the house, which was flanked either side by two drawing rooms, one of which gave access through to the conservatory.

With the exception of the saloon, the rooms were "very plain", the only design features being Gothic cornices. None of the original decorations survive in the principal rooms, however.

The basement was 14 feet tall and extended underneath the courtyard to the south of the house: this contained the kitchen, scullery, pastry-room, stillroom, dairy, wash-house, laundry, butler's pantry, steward's room, servants' hall, men's cellars, dust-pit and closets.

The property remained with the Stanhope family (Earls of Harrington) until the First World War. The inscription "Harrington House" remained over the door until the Soviet Embassy took possession, at which time it was painted over and replaced with the number 13.

== Current use ==
For 50 years prior to the United Kingdom suspending its relations with the USSR in May 1927, the Russian Embassy had been located at Chesham House, close to Belgrave Square at the corner of Chesham Place and Lyall Street. With the reestablishment of diplomatic relations with the Soviet Union in 1929, a new home was needed.

In 1924, Sir Lewis Richardson, a South African millionaire businessman, acquired Harrington House. Following designs by Sidney Parvin, Sir Lewis spent over £25,000 altering the house. These alterations including the demolition of the house's bell-turret, changing the windows of the conservatory, and replacing the original sloping roof with a flat one. Sir Lewis also made "considerable changes" inside the house. Despite the work he undertook, Sir Lewis offered the house to the United Kingdom in 1930 for use as the Soviet Embassy, donating the house to the British Crown.

The Russian Embassy is currently located further down the road, at numbers 4–5 Kensington Palace Gardens (consular department) and numbers 6–7 (the Chancery). Harrington House (number 13) is currently used as the official residence of the Russian Ambassador. The Soviet Diplomatic Mission previously also occupied numbers 10, 16 and 18, but these have since been returned to private use.

In 1991, the British government extended the Russian government's lease on the house for 99 years. The Russian government pays a token rent of £1 per year for the house; in return, Britain pays a token rent of one ruble per year for the British ambassador's residence in Moscow, the Kharitonenko Mansion at 14 Sofiyskaya Embankment.
