= Peerage of Great Britain =

System of British noble titles from 1707 to 1800

The Peerage of Great Britain comprises all extant peerages created in the Kingdom of Great Britain between the Acts of Union 1707 and the Acts of Union 1800. It replaced the Peerage of England and the Peerage of Scotland, but was itself replaced by the Peerage of the United Kingdom in 1801.

The ranks of the Peerage of Great Britain are Duke, Marquess, Earl, Viscount and Baron. Until the passage of the House of Lords Act 1999, all peers of Great Britain could sit in the House of Lords.

Some peerages of Great Britain were created for peers in the Peerage of Scotland and Peerage of Ireland as they did not have an automatic seat in the House of Lords until the Peerage Act 1963 which gave Scottish Peers an automatic right to sit in the Lords.

In the following table of peers of Great Britain, holders of higher or equal titles in the other peerages are listed. Those peers who are known by a higher title in one of the other peerages are listed in italics.

== Ranks ==
The ranks of the peerage are Duke, Marquess, Earl, Viscount, and Baron.

== Titles ==
Marquesses, earls, viscounts and barons are all addressed as 'Lord X', where 'X' represents either their territory or surname pertaining to their title. Marchionesses, countesses, viscountesses and baronesses are all addressed as 'Lady X'. Dukes and duchesses are addressed just as 'Duke' or 'Duchess' or, in a non-social context, 'Your Grace'.

== Creation of peers ==
The last non-royal dukedom of Great Britain was created in 1766, and the last marquessate of Great Britain was created in 1796. Creation of the remaining ranks ceased when the United Kingdom of Great Britain and Ireland was formed; subsequent creations of peers were in the Peerage of the United Kingdom.

The last 8 (6 non-royal and two royal) people who were created hereditary peers (from 1798 to 1800) were:

Grantee	Date of creation	Title(s)	Noted for
Sir Horatio Nelson	6 October 1798 (extinct)	Baron Nelson	Military peerage–Navy
Prince Edward	23 April 1799 (extinct)	Duke of Kent and Strathearn; Earl of Dublin	Fourth son of King George III
Prince Ernest Augustus	23 April 1799 (suspended)	Duke of Cumberland and Teviotdale; Earl of Armagh	Fifth son of King George III
Sir John Scott	18 July 1799	Baron Eldon	He was the incumbent Lord Chief Justice of the Common Pleas.
John FitzGibbon, 1st Earl of Clare	31 August 1799 (extinct)	Baron FitzGibbon	He was the incumbent Lord High Chancellor of Ireland. Also he had an imperial peerage in the House of Lords as Irish Peers were not allowed to sit in the Lords.
Alexander Hood, 1st Baron Bridport	16 June 1800	Viscount Bridport	Military peerage–Navy
Charles Cadogan, 3rd Baron Cadogan	27 December 1800	Earl Cadogan; Viscount Chelsea	
James Harris, 1st Baron Malmesbury	29 December 1800	Earl of Malmesbury; Viscount FitzHarris	

== Lists of peers ==
- 30 dukes: see List of dukes in the peerages of Britain and Ireland
- 34 marquesses: see List of marquesses in the peerages of Britain and Ireland
- 191 earls and countesses: see List of earls in the peerages of Britain and Ireland
- 111 viscounts: see List of viscounts in the peerages of Britain and Ireland
- 1,187 barons: see List of barons in the peerages of Britain and Ireland
- Women: see List of peerages created for women and List of peerages inherited by women

== Lists of extant peerages ==
=== Extant dukedoms ===
- Subsidiary title.
- Imperial peerage created for peers of Scotland and Ireland to have an automatic seat in the House of Lords until 1963 for Scotland and 1999 for Ireland.

Shield	Title	Creation	Grantee	Reason	Monarch
	Duke of Brandon; Baron Dutton	10 September 1711	(Kingdom of Scotland) James Hamilton, Duke of Hamilton (Note: Scottish Representative Peer)	His descendants sat in the House of Lords until 1963. (Note: Current peerage with special remainder.)	Queen Anne
	Duke of Manchester	28 April 1719	(Kingdom of England) Charles Montagu, Earl of Manchester		King George I
	Duke of Northumberland; Earl Percy	22 October 1766	(Kingdom of Great Britain) Hugh Percy, Earl of Northumberland	Former Viceroy of Ireland.	King George III
	Duke of Cumberland and Teviotdale; Earl of Armagh	24 April 1799	Prince Ernest Augustus	Currently suspended	King George III

=== Extant marquessates ===
- Subsidiary title.
- Imperial peerage created for peers of Scotland and Ireland to have an automatic seat in the House of Lords until 1963 for Scotland and 1999 for Ireland.

Shield	Title	Creation	Grantee	Reason	Monarch
	Marquess of Lansdowne; Earl Wycombe; Viscount Calne and Calston	6 December 1784	(Kingdom of Ireland) William Petty, Earl of Shelburne	Former Prime Minister.	King George III
	Marquess of Stafford	1 March 1786	Duke of Sutherland (United Kingdom).		King George III
	Marquess Townshend	31 October 1787	(Kingdom of England) George Townshend, Viscount Townshend	Military peerage–Army.	King George III
	Marquess of Salisbury	18 August 1789	(Kingdom of England) James Cecil, Earl of Salisbury	Incumbent Lord Chamberlain of the Household.	King George III
	Marquess of Bath	24 August 1789	(Kingdom of England) Thomas Thynne, Viscount Weymouth	Incumbent Groom of the Stool.	King George III
	Marquess of Abercorn	15 October 1790	Duke of Abercorn in the Peerage of Ireland.		King George III
	Marquess of Hertford; Earl of Yarmouth	5 July 1793	(Kingdom of Great Britain) Francis Seymour-Conway, Earl of Hertford	Former Lord Chamberlain of the Household.	King George III
	Marquess of Bute; Earl of Windsor; Viscount Mounting	21 March 1796	(Kingdom of Scotland) John Stuart, Earl of Bute	—	King George III

=== Extant earldoms ===
- Subsidiary title.
- Imperial peerage created for peers of Scotland and Ireland to have an automatic seat in the House of Lords until 1963 for Scotland and 1999 for Ireland.

Shield	Title	Creation	Grantee	Reason	Monarch
	Earl Ferrers; Viscount Tamworth	3 September 1711	(Kingdom of England) Robert Shirley, Baron Ferrers of Chartley	—	Queen Anne
	Earl of Dartmouth; Viscount Lewisham	5 September 1711	(Kingdom of England) William Legge, Baron Dartmouth	Former cabinet minister.	Queen Anne
	Earl of Tankerville	19 October 1714	(Kingdom of England) Charles Bennet, Baron Ossulston	—	King George I
	Earl of Aylesford	19 October 1714	(Kingdom of England) Heneage Finch, Baron Guernsey	Former cabinet minister.	King George I
	Earl of Bristol	19 October 1714	Marquess of Bristol (United Kingdom).		King George I
	Earl of Macclesfield; Viscount Parker	15 November 1721	(Kingdom of Great Britain) Thomas Parker, Baron Parker	Incumbent Lord High Chancellor of Great Britain.	King George I
	Earl Graham of Belford; Baron Graham	23 May 1722	Held by the Duke of Montrose in the Peerage of Scotland since 1742.		King George I
	Earl Waldegrave; Viscount Chewton	13 September 1729	(Kingdom of England) James Waldegrave, Baron Waldegrave	Incumbent Ambassador of the Holy Roman Empire	King George II
	Earl of Harrington; Viscount Petersham	9 February 1742	(Kingdom of Great Britain) William Stanhope, Baron Harrington	Incumbent cabinet minister.	King George II
	Earl of Portsmouth	11 April 1743	(Kingdom of Great Britain) John Wallop, Viscount Lymington	—	King George II
	Earl Brooke	7 July 1746	(Kingdom of England) Francis Greville, Baron Brooke	—	King George II
	Earl Gower; Viscount Trentham	8 July 1746	Duke of Sutherland (United Kingdom).		King George II
	Earl of Buckinghamshire	5 September 1746	(Kingdom of Great Britain) John Hobart, Baron Hobart	—	King George II
	Earl of Northumberland; Baron Warkworth	2 October 1749	Held by the Duke of Northumberland (Great Britain) since 1766.		King George II
	Earl of Hertford; Viscount Beauchamp	3 August 1750	Marquess of Hertford (Great Britain).		King George II
	Earl of Guilford	8 April 1752	(Kingdom of England) Francis North, Baron Guilford	—	King George II
	Earl of Hardwicke; Viscount Royston	2 April 1754	(Kingdom of Great Britain) Philip Yorke, Baron Hardwicke	Incumbent Lord High Chancellor of Great Britain.	King George II
	Earl of Ilchester	17 June 1756	(Kingdom of Great Britain) Stephen Fox-Strangways, Baron Ilchester and Stavordale		King George II
	Earl of Warwick	30 November 1759	Held by the Earl Brooke (Great Britain) since 1759.		King George II
	Earl De La Warr; Viscount Cantelupe	18 March 1761	(Kingdom of England) John West, Baron De La Warr	—	King George III
	Earl of Radnor; Baron Pleydell-Bouverie	31 October 1765	(Kingdom of Great Britain) William Bouverie, Viscount Folkestone		King George III
	Earl Spencer; Viscount Althorp	1 November 1765	(Kingdom of Great Britain) John Spencer, Viscount Spencer	—	King George III
	Earl Bathurst	27 August 1772	(Kingdom of Great Britain) Allen Bathurst, Baron Bathurst	—	King George III
	Earl of Hillsborough; Viscount Fairford	28 August 1772	Marquess of Downshire in the Peerage of Ireland.		King George III
	Earl of Ailesbury	10 June 1776	Marquess of Ailesbury (United Kingdom).		King George III
	Earl of Clarendon	14 June 1776	(Kingdom of Great Britain) Thomas Villiers, Baron Hyde	Incumbent cabinet minister.	King George III
	Earl of Mansfield	31 October 1776	(Kingdom of Great Britain) William Murray, Baron Mansfield	Incumbent Lord Chief Justice of the King's Bench.	King George III
	Earl of Abergavenny; Viscount Nevill	17 May 1784	Marquess of Abergavenny (United Kingdom).		King George III
	Earl of Uxbridge	19 May 1784	Marquess of Anglesey (United Kingdom).		King George III
	Earl Talbot; Viscount Ingestre	3 July 1784	Held by the Earl of Shrewsbury in the Peerage of England since 1858.		King George III
	Earl Grosvenor; Viscount Belgrave	5 July 1784	Duke of Westminster (United Kingdom).		King George III
	Earl Camden; Viscount Bayham	13 May 1786	Marquess Camden (United Kingdom).		King George III
	Earl of Mount Edgcumbe	31 August 1789	(Kingdom of Great Britain) George Edgcumbe, Viscount Mount Edgcumbe and Valletort	—	King George III
	Earl Fortescue; Viscount Ebrington	1 September 1789	(Kingdom of Great Britain) Hugh Fortescue, Baron Fortescue	—	King George III
	Earl of Beverley	2 November 1790	Held by the Duke of Northumberland (Great Britain) since 1865.		King George III
	Earl of Mansfield	1 August 1792	Held by the Earl of Mansfield (Great Britain) since 1843.		King George III
	Earl of Carnarvon	3 July 1793	(Kingdom of Great Britain) Henry Herbert, Baron Porchester	—	King George III
	Earl Cadogan; Viscount Chelsea	27 December 1800	(Kingdom of Great Britain) Charles Cadogan, Baron Cadogan	—	King George III
	Earl of Malmesbury; Viscount FitzHarris	29 December 1800	(Kingdom of Great Britain) James Harris, Baron Malmesbury	—	King George III

=== Extant viscountcies ===
- Subsidiary title.
- Imperial peerage created for peers of Scotland and Ireland to have an automatic seat in the House of Lords until 1963 for Scotland and 1999 for Ireland.

Shield	Title	Creation	Grantee	Reason	Monarch
	Viscount Bolingbroke; Baron St John of Lydiard Tregoze	7 July 1712	The Rt Hon. Henry St John, MP	Incumbent cabinet minister.	Queen Anne
	Viscount St John; Baron St John of Battersea	2 July 1716	Held by the Viscount Bolingbroke (Great Britain) since 1751.		King George I
	Viscount Stanhope; Baron Stanhope of Elvaston	2 July 1717	Held by the Earl of Harrington (Great Britain) since 1967.		King George I
	Viscount Cobham; Baron Cobham	23 May 1718	(Kingdom of Great Britain) Richard Temple, Baron Cobham	Military peerage–Army.	King George I
	Viscount Falmouth; Baron Boscawen-Rose	9 June 1720	Hugh Boscawen, Esq, MP	Former Member of Parliament for the Whig Party.	King George I
	Viscount Lymington; Baron Wallop	11 June 1720	Earl of Portsmouth (Great Britain).		King George I
	Viscount Torrington; Baron Byng	21 September 1721	The Rt Hon. Sir George Byng, Bt., MP	Military peerage–Navy.	King George I
	Viscount Leinster	21 February 1747	Duke of Leinster in the Peerage of Ireland.		King George II
	Viscount Folkestone; Baron Longford	29 June 1747	Earl of Radnor (Great Britain).		King George II
	Viscount Spencer; Baron Spencer of Althorp	3 April 1761	Earl Spencer (Great Britain).		King George III
	Viscount Mount Edgcumbe and Valletort	5 March 1781	Earl of Mount Edgcumbe (Great Britain).		King George III
	Viscount Hamilton	8 August 1786	Duke of Abercorn in the Peerage of Ireland.		King George III
	Viscount Hood	1 June 1796	(Kingdom of Ireland) Samuel Hood, Baron Hood, MP	Military peerage–Navy.	King George III
	Viscount Lowther; Baron Lowther	26 October 1796	Earl of Lonsdale (United Kingdom).		King George III

=== Extant baronies ===
- Subsidiary title.
- Imperial peerage created for peers of Scotland and Ireland to have an automatic seat in the House of Lords until 1963 for Scotland and 1999 for Ireland.

Shield	Title	Creation	Grantee	Reason	Monarch
	Baron Boyle of Marston	5 September 1711	(Kingdom of Ireland) Charles Boyle, Earl of Orrery, also held with the Earl of Cork since 1753.	His descendants sat in the House of Lords until 1999.	Queen Anne
	Baron Hay	31 December 1711	Held by the Earl of Kinnoull in the Peerage of Scotland since 1719.		Queen Anne
	Baron Bathurst	1 January 1712	Earl Bathurst (Great Britain).		Queen Anne
	Baron Middleton	1 January 1712	Sir Thomas Willoughby, Bt., MP	Former Member of Parliament for Nottinghamshire and Newark.	Queen Anne
	Baron Parker	10 March 1716	Earl of Macclesfield (Great Britain).		King George I
	Baron Onslow	19 June 1716	Earl of Onslow (United Kingdom).		King George I
	Baron Romney	22 June 1716	Earl of Romney (United Kingdom).		King George I
	Baron Newburgh	10 July 1716	Marquess of Cholmondeley (United Kingdom).		King George I
	Baron Cadogan	8 May 1718	Earl Cadogan (Great Britain).		King George I
	Baron Percy	21 January 1722	Held by the Duke of Northumberland (Great Britain) since 1957.		King George I
	Baron Walpole	1 June 1723	Robert Walpole, Esq.		King George I
	Baron Hobart	28 May 1728	Earl of Buckinghamshire (Great Britain).		King George II
	Baron Monson	28 May 1728	Sir John Monson, Bt., MP	Former Member of Parliament for Lincolnshire, Castle Rising and Cricklade.	King George II
	Baron Harrington	6 January 1730	Earl of Harrington (Great Britain).		King George II
	Baron Hardwicke	23 November 1733	Earl of Hardwicke (Great Britain).		King George II
	Baron Talbot of Hensol	5 December 1733	Earl of Shrewsbury in the Peerage of England.		King George II
	Baron Ilchester	11 May 1741	Earl of Ilchester (Great Britain).		King George II
	Baron Strangways	11 May 1741	Earl of Ilchester (Great Britain).		King George II
	Baron Edgcumbe	20 April 1742	Earl of Mount Edgcumbe (Great Britain).		King George II
	Baron Bruce	17 April 1746	Marquess of Ailesbury (United Kingdom).		King George II
	Baron Fortescue	5 July 1746	Earl Fortescue (Great Britain).		King George II
	Baron Ilchester and Stavordale	12 January 1747	Earl of Ilchester (Great Britain).		King George II
	Baron Ponsonby of Sysonby	12 June 1749	(Kingdom of Ireland) Brabazon Ponsonby, Earl of Bessborough, MP	His descendants sat in the House of Lords until 1999.	King George II
	Baron Vere of Hanworth	28 March 1750	Held by the Duke of St Albans in the Peerage of England since 1787.		King George II
	Baron Hyde	3 June 1756	Earl of Clarendon (Great Britain).		King George II
	Baron Walpole	4 June 1756	Held by the Baron Walpole (Great Britain) since 1931.		King George II
	Baron Harwich	17 November 1756	Marquess of Downshire in the Peerage of Ireland.		King George II
	Baron Wycombe	17 May 1760	Marquess of Lansdowne (Great Britain).		King George II
	Baron Mount Stuart of Wortley	3 April 1761	Marquess of Bute (Great Britain).		King George III
	Baron Grosvenor	8 April 1761	Duke of Westminster (United Kingdom).		King George III
	Baron Scarsdale	9 April 1761	Held by the Viscount Scarsdale (United Kingdom) since 1911.		King George III
	Baron Boston	10 April 1761	Sir William Irby, Bt.	Former Member of Parliament for Launceston and Bodmin.	King George III
	Baron Pelham of Stanmer	4 May 1762	Earl of Chichester (United Kingdom).		King George III
	Baron Vernon	12 May 1762	George Venables-Vernon, Esq, MP	Former Member of Parliament for Lichfield and Derby.	King George III
	Baron Ducie	27 April 1763	Earl of Ducie (United Kingdom).		King George III
	Baron Camden	17 July 1765	Marquess Camden (United Kingdom).		King George III
	Baron Digby	19 August 1765	(Kingdom of Ireland) Henry Digby, Baron Digby, MP	His descendants sat in the House of Lords until 1999.	King George III
	Baron Sundridge	22 December 1766	Held by the Duke of Argyll in the Peerage of Scotland since 1770.		King George III
	Baron Apsley	24 January 1771	Held by the Earl Bathurst (Great Britain) since 1775.		King George III
	Baron Brownlow	20 May 1776	Sir Brownlow Cust, Bt., MP	Former Member of Parliament for Lincolnshire and Stamford.	King George III
	Baron Cardiff	20 May 1776	Marquess of Bute (Great Britain).		King George III
	Baron Cranley	20 May 1776	Earl of Onslow (United Kingdom).		King George III
	Baron Foley	20 May 1776	Thomas Foley, Esq, MP	Former Member of Parliament for Stafford.	King George III
	Baron Hamilton of Hameldon	20 May 1776	Held by the Duke of Argyll in the Peerage of Scotland since 1806.		King George III
	Baron Harrowby	20 May 1776	Earl of Harrowby (United Kingdom).		King George III
	Baron Hawke	20 May 1776	The Rt. Hon. Sir Edward Hawke, MP	Military peerage–Navy.	King George III
	Baron Southampton	17 September 1780	Charles FitzRoy, Esq.	Military peerage–Army.	King George III
	Baron Bagot	12 October 1780	Sir William Bagot, Bt.	Former Member of Parliament for the Staffordshire.	King George III
	Baron Dynevor	17 October 1780	(Kingdom of Great Britain) William Talbot, Earl Talbot	Incumbent Lord Steward of the Household.	King George III
	Baron Porchester	17 October 1780	Earl of Carnarvon (Great Britain).		King George III
	Baron Walsingham	17 October 1780	The Rt. Hon. Sir William de Grey	Former Lord Chief Justice of the Common Pleas.	King George III
	Baron Grantley	9 April 1782	The Rt. Hon. Sir Fletcher Norton, MP	Former Speaker of the House of Commons.	King George III
	Baron Rodney	19 June 1782	Sir George Brydges Rodney, Bt., MP	Military peerage–Navy.	King George III
	Baron Lovaine	28 January 1784	Duke of Northumberland (Great Britain).		King George III
	Baron Somers	17 May 1784	Sir Charles Cocks, Bt.	Former Member of Parliament for Reigate.	King George III
	Baron Boringdon	18 May 1784	Earl of Morley (United Kingdom).		King George III
	Baron Eliot	13 June 1784	Earl of St Germans (United Kingdom).		King George III
	Baron Carleton	21 August 1786	(Kingdom of Ireland) Richard Boyle, Earl of Shannon, MP	His descendants sat in the House of Lords until 1999.	King George III
	Baron Suffield	21 August 1786	Sir Harbord Harbord, Bt., MP	Former Member of Parliament for the Whig Party.	King George III
	Baron Tyrone	21 August 1786	Marquess of Waterford in the Peerage of Ireland.		King George III
	Baron Kenyon	9 June 1788	The Rt. Hon. Sir Lloyd Kenyon, Bt., MP	Incumbent Lord Chief Justice of the King's Bench.	King George III
	Baron Howe	19 August 1788	Earl Howe (United Kingdom).		King George III
	Baron Braybrooke	5 September 1788	(Kingdom of England) John Griffin, Baron Howard de Walden	Military peerage–Army.	King George III
	Baron Malmesbury	19 September 1788	Earl of Malmesbury (Great Britain).		King George III
	Baron Fisherwick	3 July 1790	Marquess of Donegall in the Peerage of Ireland.		King George III
	Baron Verulam	6 July 1790	Earl of Verulam (United Kingdom).		King George III
	Baron Gage	1 November 1790	(Kingdom of Ireland) William Gage, Viscount Gage, MP	His descendants sat in the House of Lords until 1999.	King George III
	Baron Thurlow	11 June 1792	(Kingdom of Great Britain) Edward Thurlow, Baron Thurlow	Incumbent Lord High Chancellor of Great Britain.	King George III
	Baron Auckland	22 May 1793	(Kingdom of Ireland) William Eden, Baron Auckland, MP	His descendants sat in the House of Lords until 1999.	King George III
	Baron Bradford	13 August 1794	Earl of Bradford (United Kingdom).		King George III
	Baron Clive	13 August 1794	Earl of Powis (United Kingdom).		King George III
	Baron Curzon	13 August 1794	Earl Howe (United Kingdom).		King George III
	Baron Dundas	13 August 1794	Marquess of Zetland (United Kingdom).		King George III
	Baron Lyttelton	13 August 1794	Held by the Viscount Cobham (Great Britain) since 1889.		King George III
	Baron Mendip	13 August 1794	Held by the Earl of Normanton in the Peerage of Ireland since 1974.		King George III
	Baron Mulgrave	13 August 1794	Marquess of Normanby (United Kingdom).		King George III
	Baron Yarborough	13 August 1794	Earl of Yarborough (United Kingdom).		King George III
	Baron Hood	27 May 1795	Viscount Hood in Peerage of Great Britain.		King George III
	Baron Loughborough	31 October 1795	Earl of Rosslyn (United Kingdom).		King George III
	Baron Rous	28 May 1796	Earl of Stradbroke (United Kingdom).		King George III
	Baron Brodrick	1 June 1796	(Kingdom of Ireland) George Brodrick, Viscount Midleton, MP	His descendants sat in the House of Lords until 1999.	King George III
	Baron Stuart	4 June 1796	(Kingdom of Scotland) Francis Stuart, Earl of Moray	His descendants sat in the House of Lords until 1963.	King George III
	Baron Stewart of Garlies	6 June 1796	(Kingdom of Scotland) John Stewart, Earl of Galloway, MP	His descendants sat in the House of Lords until 1963.	King George III
	Baron Saltersford	7 June 1796	(Kingdom of Ireland) James Stopford, Earl of Courtown	His descendants sat in the House of Lords until 1999.	King George III
	Baron Harewood	18 June 1796	Earl of Harewood (United Kingdom).		King George III
	Baron Cawdor	21 June 1796	Earl Cawdor (United Kingdom).		King George III
	Baron Bolton	20 October 1797	The Rt. Hon. Thomas Orde-Powlett	Former cabinet minister.	King George III
	Baron Carrington	20 October 1797	(Kingdom of Ireland) Robert Smith, Baron Carrington, MP	His descendants sat in the House of Lords until 1999.	King George III
	Baron Minto	20 October 1797	Earl of Minto (United Kingdom).		King George III
	Baron Lilford	26 October 1797	Thomas Powys, Esq.	Former Member of Parliament for Northamptonshire.	King George III
	Baron Wodehouse	26 October 1797	Earl of Kimberley (United Kingdom).		King George III
	Baron Eldon	18 July 1799	Earl of Eldon (United Kingdom).		King George III

== Extinct peerages since the passage of the House of Lords Act 1999 ==
=== Extinct baronies ===
Shield	Title	Creation	Extinct	Grantee	Reason	Monarch
	Baron King	29 May 1725	31 January 2018	Sir Peter King	Incumbent Lord High Chancellor of Great Britain.	King George I
	Baron Lovel and Holland	7 May 1762	6 November 2011	(Kingdom of Ireland) John Perceval, Earl of Egmont, MP	His descendants sat in the House of Lords until 1999.	King George III

== Current titles without heirs ==
=== Current peers of Great Britain ===
Title	Monarch
Barons
Baron Brownlow	King George III
Baron Hawke	King George III

=== Current Scottish and Irish peers with British titles ===
Currently none

== See also ==
- British nobility
- Dukes in the United Kingdom
- History of the British peerage
- Marquesses in the United Kingdom
- Peerage of England
- Peerage of Scotland
- Peerage of Ireland
- Peerages in the United Kingdom
