= Moorish Temple at Elvaston Castle =

A summerhouse in the gardens of Elvaston Castle

The Moorish Temple at Elvaston Castle
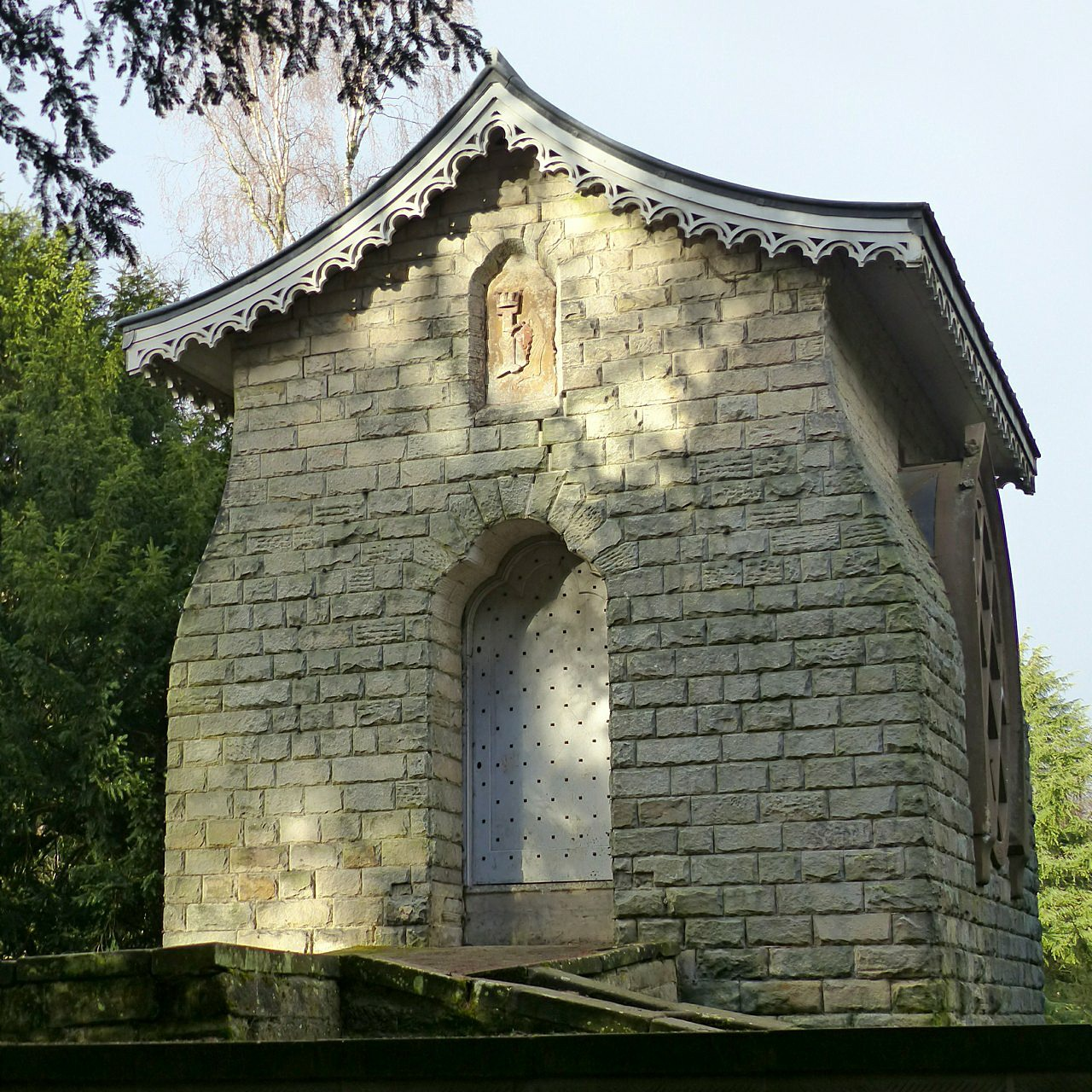
- Back side of the Temple, including the terrace

- Location within Derbyshire

General information
- Type: Victorian Summerhouse
- Architectural style: Gothic-Sino-Moorish
- Classification: Grade II listed
- Location: Elvaston, Derbyshire, England, United Kingdom
- Coordinates: 52.8911°N 1.3964°W 52.89117302595765, -1.3964184258577712
- Year built: (c. 1846)
- Renovated: 2011
- Client: Lord Charles Stanhope, 4th Earl of Harrington
- Owner: Derbyshire County Council

Design and construction
- Architect: L. N. Cottingham

The Moorish Temple is a summerhouse in the gardens of Elvaston Castle, a stately home in Elvaston, Derbyshire. The temple and gardens are owned by Derbyshire County Council as a country park known as Elvaston Castle Country Park. The temple's design is accredited to architect Lewis Cottingham. It was built as a summerhouse for the 4th Earl of Harrington (c.1846). The design has inspirations from Gothic Revival, Traditional-Sino, and Moorish architecture. The building consists of a main two-storey house, with a connected terrace. Historic England has given the temple a Grade II listing. Despite a restoration in 2011, the temple is in a neglected condition with the interior closed off from the public. In 2017, The Elvaston Castle and Gardens Trust was created; it is are responsible for the upkeep of the temple, terrace and surrounding gardens.

== History ==
The temple was designed for the eccentric Lord Petersham (4th Earl of Harrington) around 1846, by architect Lewis Nockalls Cottingham.

=== Lewis Cottingham (architect) ===
Cottingham was one of the originators of the Gothic Revival, noted to have "played a notable part in the development of the Early Gothic Revival". Cottingham is accredited with many architectural works, including Tower House in Suffolk, Hereford Cathedral in Herefordshire, and the restoration of Snelston Hall in Derbyshire.

=== Charles Stanhope, 4th Earl of Harrington ===
Lord Petersham (Charles Stanhope, 4th Earl of Harrington), inventor of the eponymous overcoat and close friends with King George IV, is said to have owned around 365 snuff boxes. Because of this, he hired Cottingham to design a trendy Anglo-Chinois style summerhouse for him to smoke his cigars and "Keep out the riff-raff". Thus, Cottingham designed the Moorish Temple as we see it today.

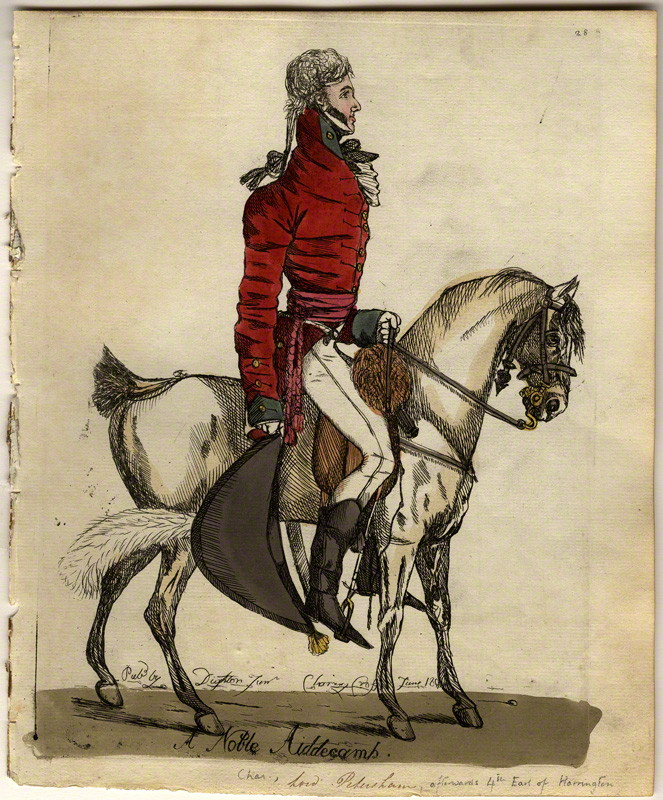
Charles Stanhope, 4th Earl of Harrington

=== William Barron (Head Gardener) ===
Cottingham worked closely with lead gardener William Barron to design the building. Barron lined the attached terrace with trees and planted a stately garden in front of the Temple.

== Restoration ==
For decades, the temple was heavily neglected, leading to it being heavily vandalised and left to ruin. It is noted that Lord Petersham "would be apologetic if he saw the state of it". The Temple was restored in 2011.

=== Bats ===
It had been known for many years that there were multiple bat roosts in the Temple. Because of this, Derbyshire County Council commissioned a local consultancy firm, Baker Consultants, to carry out a bat survey. They performed dusk/dawn surveys in which they found a total of seven bat roosts in the building, including a maternity roost and a hibernation roost. Due to these roosts, the restoration of the Temple had to be conducted extremely carefully and using hand tools as to not disturb the bats. No bats were knowingly disturbed during the restoration.

=== Restoration ===
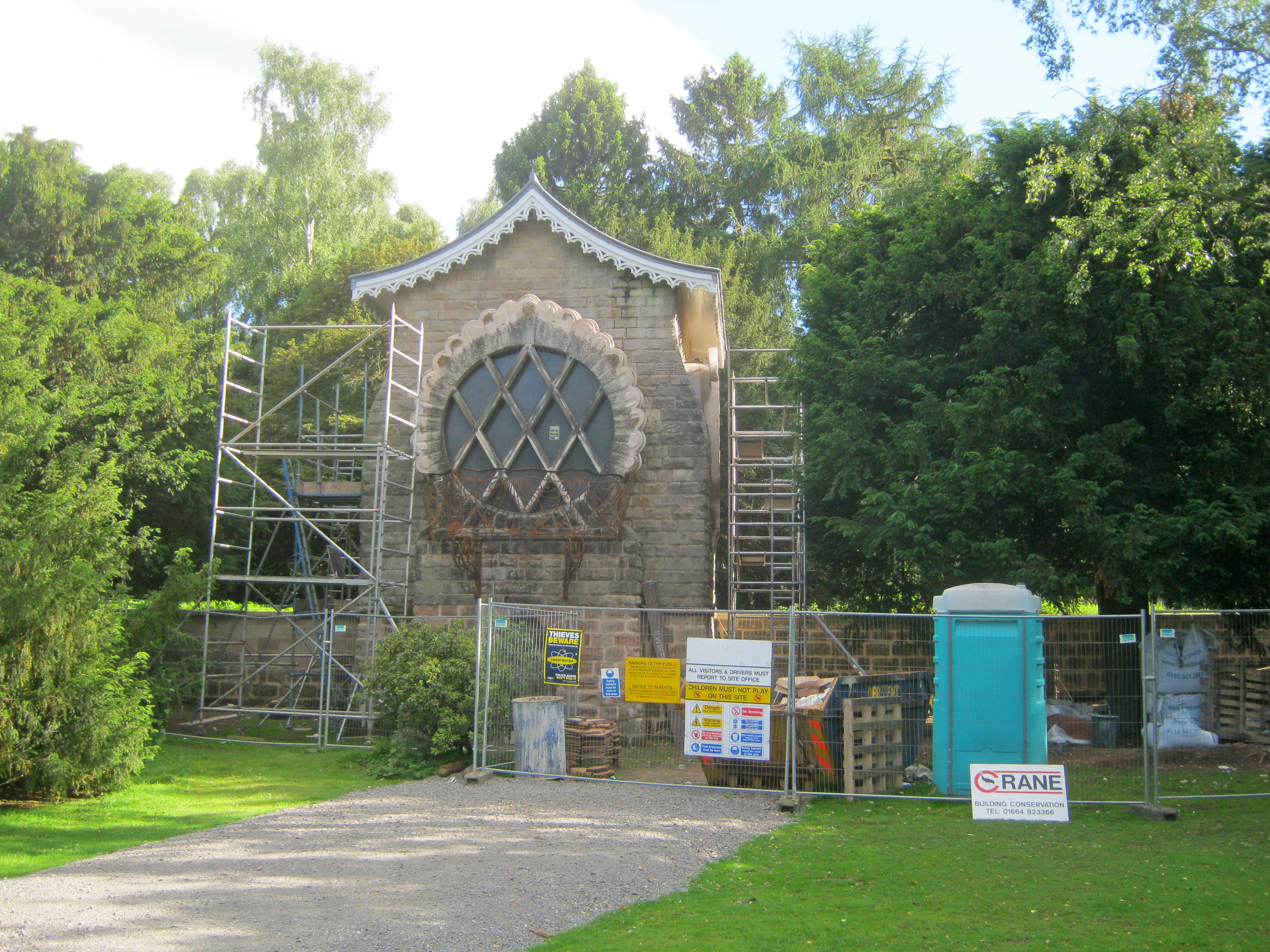
The Moorish Temple undergoing restoration

With help from English Heritage and South Derbyshire District Council, Derbyshire County Council granted the restoration of the Moorish Temple in 2011. Led by Simpson & Brown Architects, the construction firm, C.R. Crane and Sons., performed as much of the restoration as possible using hand tools, in order to comply with the Wildlife and Countryside Act 1981. During the restoration, the entire roof was removed and replaced with a restored roof, as well as the eastern window.

== Recent years ==
=== 2021 planning proposal ===
In 2021, Planning & Design Practice Ltd. proposed a £35 million restoration and transformation project for the entire site, including the Moorish Temple and surrounding gardens. Nothing has come of this proposal.

=== Current condition ===
The condition of the Temple is much better than it was before 2011, and it is fully intact. However, it is visibly still fairly neglected, with the interior closed to the public. Every window is boarded up with black boards, and the doors are sealed shut. The wooden doors, particularly the southern door that connects to the terrace, has many carvings of people's names. The iron balcony is in satisfactory condition, but slightly rusted. The surrounding gardens and terrace are all nicely kept by The Elvaston Castle and Gardens Trust, but they differ from Barron's original design.

The Moorish Temple was featured in the 1969 Ken Russell film 'Women In Love' in which Glenda Jackson appears on the balcony of the Temple.

== See also ==
- Elvaston Castle
- Charles Stamhope, 4th Earl of Harrington
- Lewis Nockalls Cottingham
- William Barron (gardener)
