= Elvaston Castle =

Stately home in Elvaston, Derbyshire, England

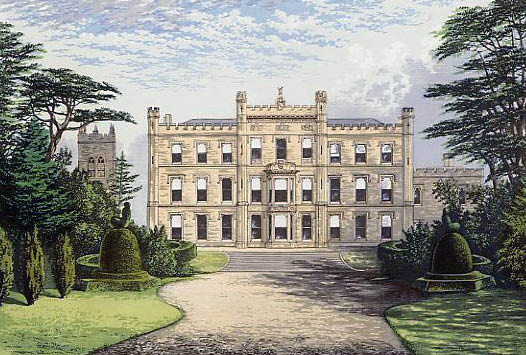
- Elvaston Castle in the late 19th century

- Location within Derbyshire

General information
- Architectural style: Gothic Revival
- Location: Elvaston, Derbyshire, England, United Kingdom
- Coordinates: 52°53′34″N 1°23′43″W
- Construction started: 1815–1829 (Extended and Remodeled)
- Completed: 1836 & then in 1860 further works were undertaken where there were extensive alterations including re-modeling of the east wing to correspond to the south front, whereby the entire wing was to be raised an additional story
- Owner: Earl of Harrington; Derbyshire County Council

Design and construction
- Architects: James Wyatt, Robert Walker, Lewis Nockalls Cottingham

Listed Building – Grade II*
- Designated: 2 September 1952 - House; 4 August 1984 - Park
- Reference no.: 1334604 - Country House; 1000404 - Park and Garden

Listed Building – Grade II
- Number of Listings: 14 including Boat House, Coach House, Grotto and Moorish Temple

Elvaston Castle is a stately home in Elvaston, Derbyshire, England. The Gothic Revival castle and surrounding parkland is run and owned by Derbyshire County Council as a country park known as Elvaston Castle Country Park. The country park has 200 acres (0.81 km^{2}) of woodlands, parkland and formal gardens.

The centrepiece of the estate is the Grade II* Listed Elvaston Castle. The castle has been neglected and is in need of restoration. Due to its condition, the building is not open to the public, and since 2008 has been listed on the Buildings at Risk Register. Derbyshire County Council estimates the castle and estate requires significant investment for both restoration and to support its longer-term maintenance. In 2017, The Elvaston Castle and Gardens Trust was created to manage the estate once these works, which are already underway, are completed.

== History ==
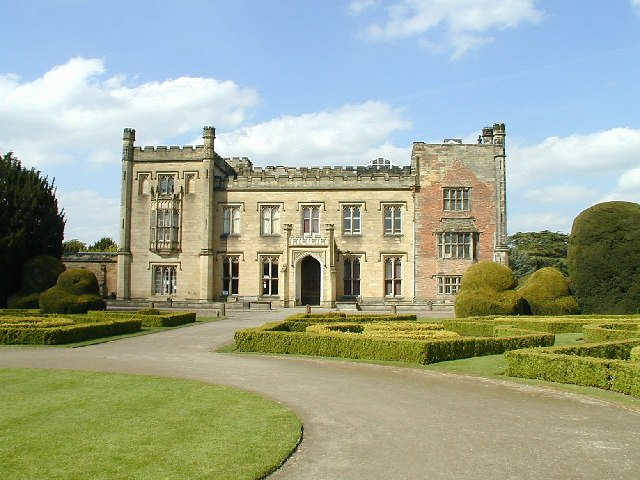
Elvaston Castle today

Until the 16th century the estate was held by the Shelford Priory. After the Dissolution of the Monasteries the Crown sold the priory and its estates in 1538 to Sir Michael Stanhope of Rampton, Nottinghamshire. Sir John Stanhope (died 1611) granted the estate to his second son, also Sir John Stanhope (d .1638), High Sheriff of Derbyshire, in 1629.

The manor house was built for the latter Sir John in 1633. This Elizabethan-style house was redesigned and extended in a grand Gothic Revival style by James Wyatt in the early 19th century for Charles Stanhope, 3rd Earl of Harrington. Wyatt designed a new wing, a new great hall, and most of the interiors of the castle, but died before work was completed. His designs were carried out by Robert Walker between 1815 and 1829.

Further modifications were made in the 1836 by the architect Lewis Nockalls Cottingham; this work was on the Elizabethan-styled south front which was remodelled to match the rest of the now Gothic-styled castle.

In 1860–1861 there were further alterations. The Earl of Harrington contracted alterations carried out by Robert Bridgart's building company of Friar Gate Derby under the direction of Messrs Giles & Brookhouse, architects. Both newspaper articles have lengthy descriptions of all the alterations. Robert Bridgart died in 1860 during the alterations and his son (Robert Bridgart of Derby) took over the building works.

During World War II, the house was turned into a teacher training college after the original college in Derby was evacuated.

The college vacated the house in 1947, after which time it remained mostly empty for the next two decades until its sale, starting a steady decline that continues to this day.

=== Gardens ===
Detail from painting of William Barron in Derby Museum

The 3rd Earl approached Capability Brown to remodel the grounds of the Castle. He turned down the commission due to the flatness of the estate, which he described as having 'no capability'. In 1830, Charles Stanhope, 4th Earl of Harrington commissioned landscape gardener William Barron to redesign the gardens. The Fourth Earl caused scandal by marrying an actress 17 years his junior: Maria Foote. Maria and Charles were described as "inseparable and besotted"; the Earl wanted the gardens to be a "private and secluded oasis of great beauty" for himself and the love of his life. Barron would spend the next 20 years working on the gardens; he even brought in full-grown trees using a tree planting machine he had designed (an example of which is on display at Kew Gardens) to try to give instant gratification to the Earl.

The Fourth Earl and his Countess valued their garden for the romantic seclusion it afforded them, however following the death of their only son aged 4, the couple isolated themselves at the castle, never leaving and forbidding anyone from entering the grounds. (Some sources claim it was the Earl that instigated the seclusion and forbade his wife from leaving) Following the Fourth Earl's death in 1851, his brother, Leicester Stanhope, 5th Earl of Harrington, opened the gardens to the public. They became renowned as "a Gothic paradise", and are Grade II Listed.

The estate contains over 50 structures, including stables, kennels, a walled garden, a home farm, several cottages, gatelodges, an ice house and a boathouse. The gardens are listed Grade II* on the Register of Historic Parks and Gardens.

== Country park ==
Following the Countryside Act 1968, the estate was sold in 1969 by William Stanhope, 11th Earl of Harrington to Derbyshire County Council. By The Countryside Act proposed the creation of "country parks", "for the enjoyment of the countryside by the public". The council opened the estate to the public in 1970 and have operated it since then, as Elvaston Castle Country Park. In 1969, Elvaston was also used as a location for Ken Russell's film adaptation of the D.H. Lawrence novel Women in Love.

== Today ==
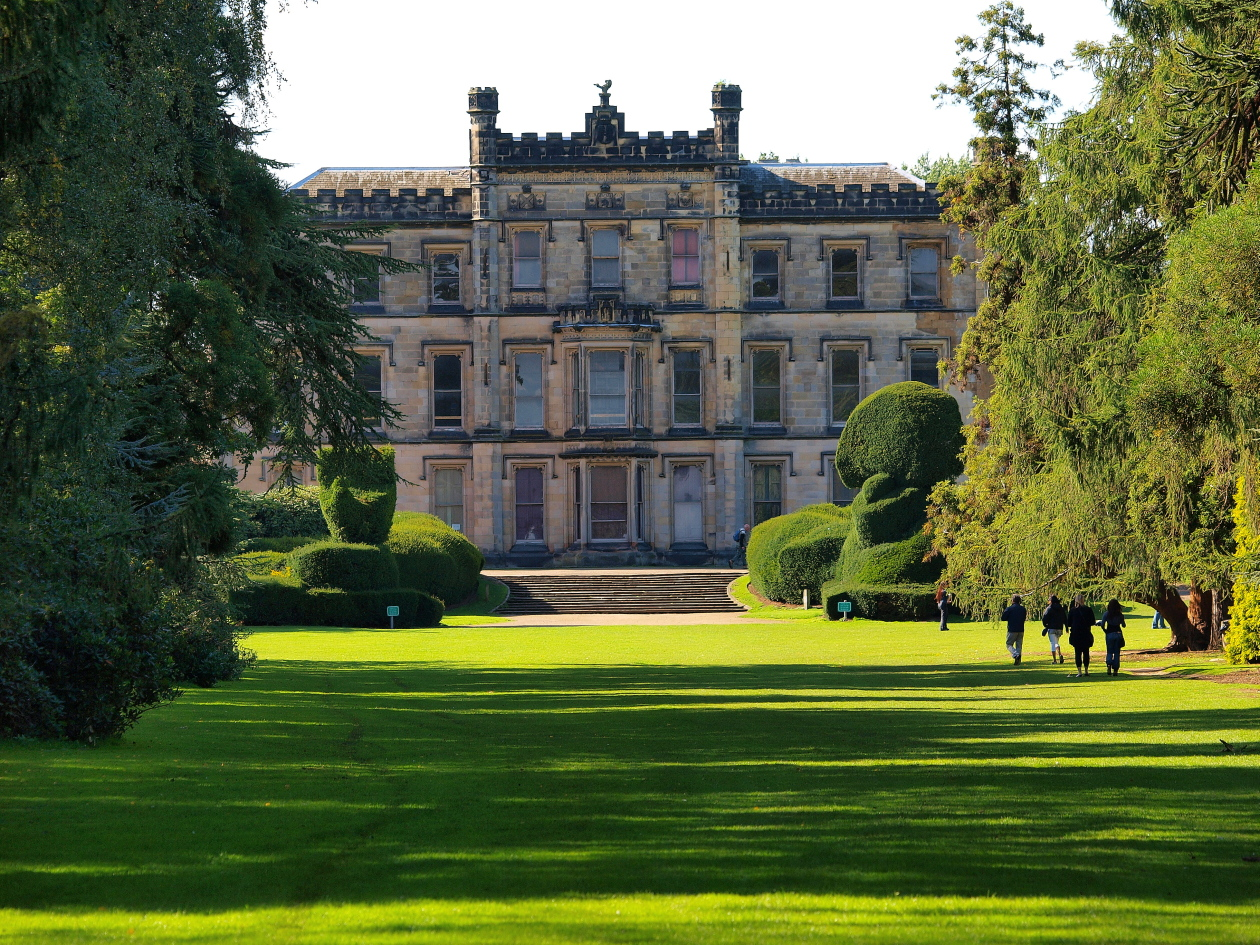
Elvaston Castle, 2010

The deterioration of the castle and estate which started after World War II continued until the 1970s. Although restoration work was carried out and the gardens and park brought back into good heart, the operating costs were significant. With dwindling public funds available, and priorities elsewhere by 1990 the castle was considered unsafe and was closed to visitors. In 2000, the council estimated the country park's running costs were £500,000 a year, and that they were facing a backlog of restoration work which would cost £3,000,000. In 2006, Derbyshire County Council commissioned a report, which estimated the castle and estate required at least £6.1 million of work and materials in essential repairs. Whilst development partners were interested in the Castle, a combination of public opposition and difficulty creating a plan which would achieve a suitable balance of development and access meant that these plans fell through. The castle is thought by the credulous to be haunted and inspired a gothic "novel" entitled "Elvingstone" by J.P Reedman. In 2013 The County Council asked The National Trust for help to create a future vision for the estate. This led, in 2015, to the County Council recruiting a Project Development Board to help it shape a future for the Estate as a charitable enterprise, further developing the Masterplan and exploring options for a sustainable future. This led to the formation of a totally independent board of Trustees in 2017 - The Elvaston Castle and Gardens Trust - and to the beginning of a new era for the estate. As of March 2025 due to rising costs and much needed restoration works Derbyshire County Council announced that the Castle and Grounds were to be put up for sale, the grounds still remain open to the public at this time.

== See also ==
- Grade II* listed buildings in South Derbyshire
- Listed buildings in Elvaston, Derbyshire
- Earl of Harrington
