= William Barron (gardener) =

British landscape gardener and designer

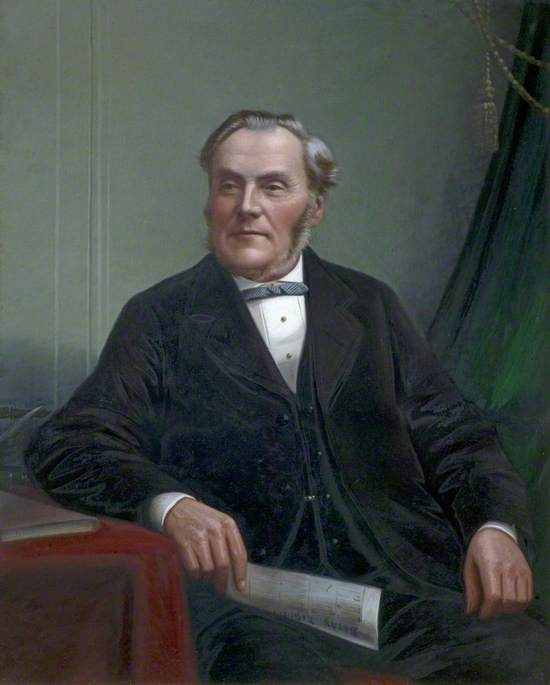
- Born: 2 October 1805; Eccles, Berwickshire, Scotland
- Died: 8 April 1891 (aged 85); Borrowash, Derbyshire, England
- Resting place: Borrowash Cemetery
- Occupations: Landscape gardener, nurseryman, park and garden designer
- Employer(s): Charles Stanhope, 4th Earl of Harrington, Leicester Stanhope, 5th Earl of Harrington
- Organization(s): W. Barron and Son
- Known for: Work at Elvaston Castle, tree transplanting techniques
- Notable work: The British Winter Garden: A Practical Treatise on Evergreens
- Spouse(s): Sarah née Allester (m. 1841, d. 1858), Elizabeth Ashby
- Children: John Barron, Frances Barron
- Parents: John Barron (father); Betty née Johnston (mother)

William Barron (2 October 1805–8 April 1891) was a British landscape gardener, nurseryman and park and garden designer. His work in the grounds at Elvaston Castle established his reputation as one of the most respected landscape gardeners of his time.

== Early life ==
Barron was born on 2 October 1805 in Eccles in Berwickshire, the son of John Barron, a gardener, and his wife Betty née Johnston. After serving a three-year gardening apprenticeship at Blackadder in Berwickshire, he joined the Royal Botanic Garden Edinburgh where he quickly found himself in charge of the glasshouses. He then went to Syon House in Middlesex where he was involved in planting the new conservatory for Syon Park. In March 1830 Barron was appointed head gardener to Charles Stanhope, 4th Earl of Harrington, at Elvaston Castle, where he was instructed to create a new garden. Barron was to remain here for the next 32 years.

== Elvaston Castle ==
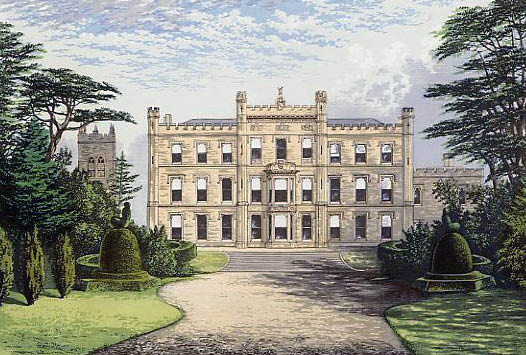
Elvaston Castle in 1880

At Elvaston Castle Barron worked on the surrounding gardens, woodlands and pleasure grounds, where he introduced many innovative designs and techniques. Among these were architectural topiary and intricate drainage methods. At Elvaston his:

... hugely ambitious tree-transplanting, propagating and grafting, transformed a largely featureless site into one of the most celebrated gardens in Europe and North America. Hundreds of trees, including very large and mature specimens, were moved across Derbyshire and adjacent counties, whilst the grounds, and especially the pinetum and Barron's British Winter Garden, promoted the use of evergreens in public and private spaces, helping to drive the new fashion in British, European and American gardens. Barron came to be regarded as one of the leading British arboricultural experts...

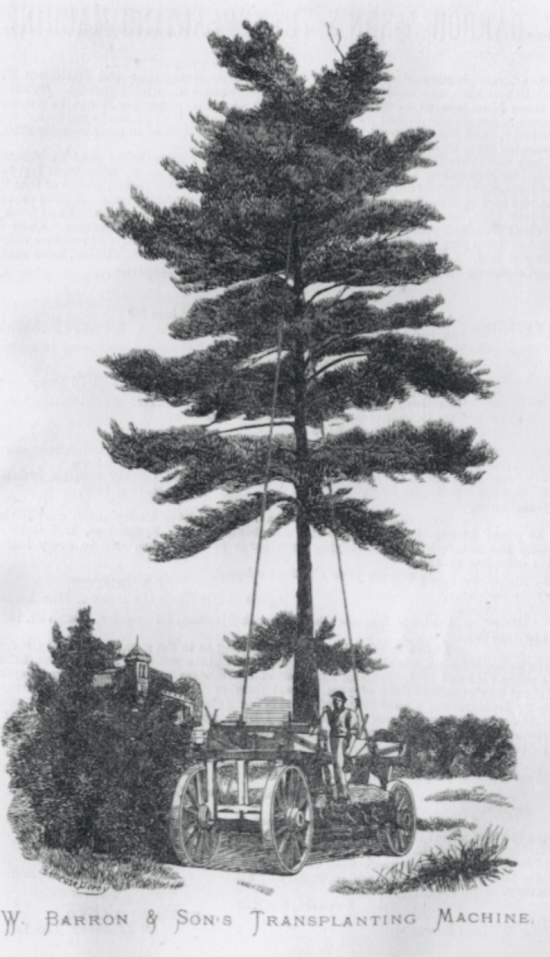
William Barron's transplanting machine c1867

In 1831 Barron became an expert at removing and transferring mature trees - a development largely born out of the Earl's impatience at wanting to see his gardens in full splendour. Barron described his method of tree planting in his book, The British Winter Garden: A Practical Treatise on Evergreens (1852).

In it he wrote:

In pointing out to my noble employer the utter impossibility of accomplishing his object ... and witnessing his disappointment ... I told him that if he would risk his trees, and would support me in forming a system that would answer, I would risk my character, which was all that I could afford ... I then set about conquering the mechanical difficulty . . .

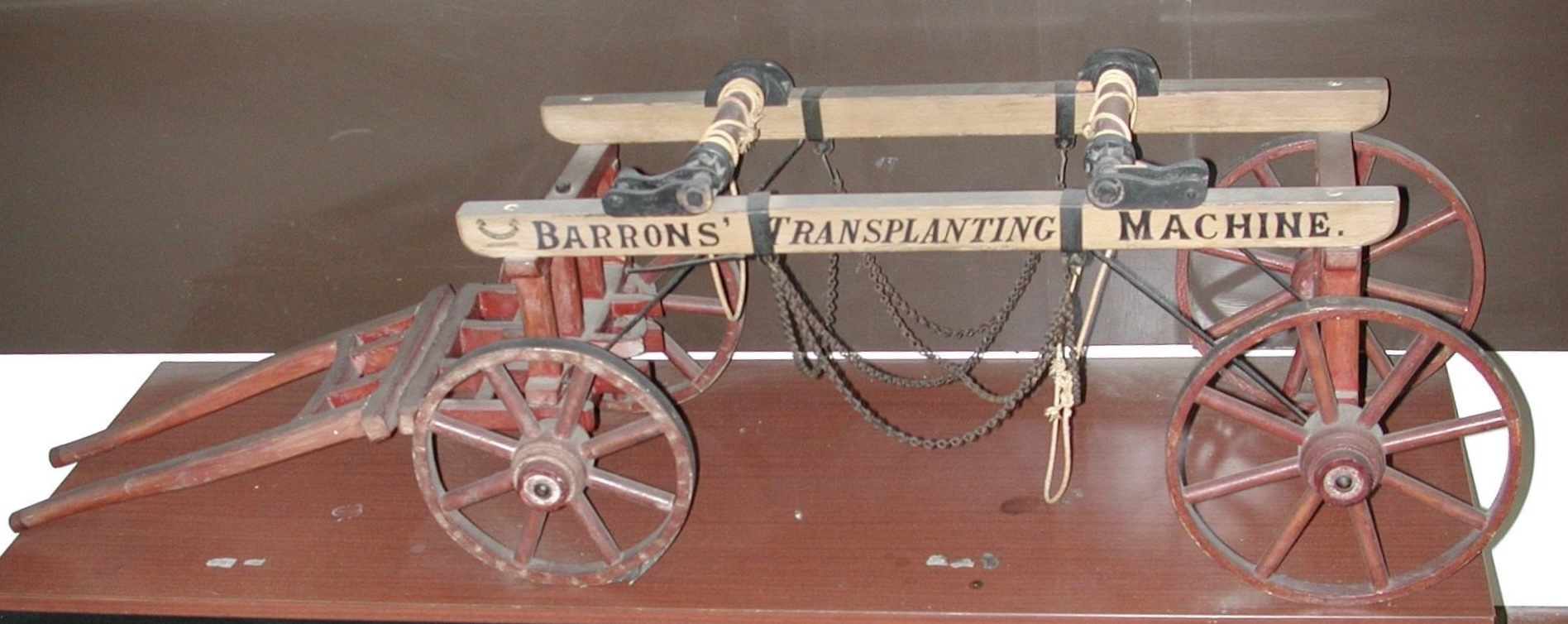
A scale model of Barron's tree transplanting machine at Kew Gardens

Barron was able to reduce the time for transplanting a large tree from two years to three months. Among the trees moved by Barron to Elvaston was a large yew which was used an arbour, which was about a hundred years old and which was transported 25 miles. Barron's method was not to move the trees horizontally, which lost a lot of branches and roots and which could damage the tree; but rather to move them vertically without needing to remove much of the foliage. In order to remove the tree from its original location tunnels would be bored under the trunk and heavy wooden beams inserted to support the tree while it was levered up before it was carried to its new location. In 1871 Barron relocated a cedar tree which stood at 43 feet in height with branches 48 feet wide, using his transplanter pulled by six horses and about half a dozen men.

== Tree transplanting ==
When Queen Victoria heard of Barron's transplanting success she engaged his services to transplant a silver fir at Osborne House on the Isle of Wight to replace one which had died. The replacement was lifted together with its root ball weighing half a ton, and hauled to Osborne House where it was successfully replanted.

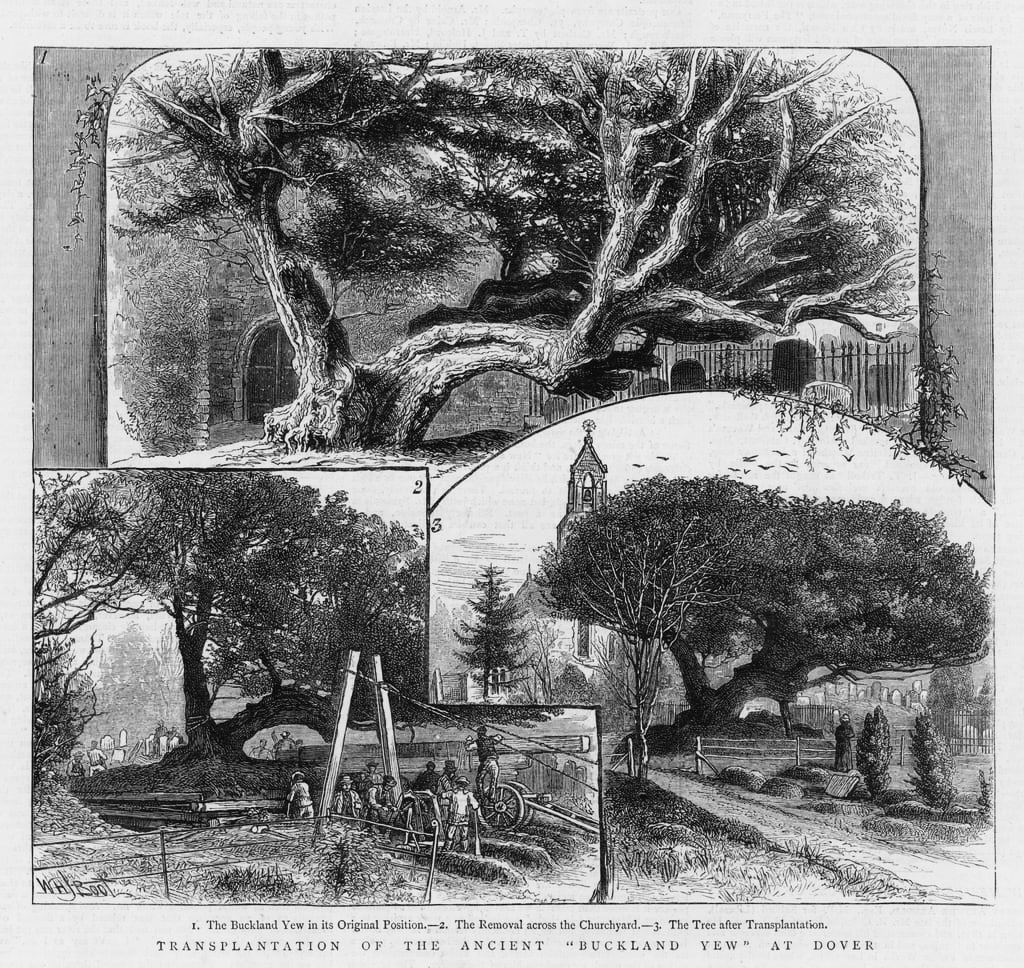
Transplanting the 800-year old Buckland Yew - The Graphic, 10 July 1880

Another tree moved by Barron's "ponderous" machine was the 800-year old Buckland Yew, which was moved fifty-six feet across the churchyard of St Andrew's church in Buckland in Dover in 1880 to make way for an extension to the church. The event was depicted in The Graphic and described in Barron's obituary in The Gardeners' Chronicle in April 1891. A surviving Barron transplanter is displayed at Kew Gardens.

== W. Barron and Son ==
On the death of the 4th Earl of Harrington in 1851 Barron was instructed by Leicester Stanhope, the 5th Earl of Harrington, to construct a commercial nursery in the garden at Elvaston. Stanhope was inclined to make money out of the estate rather than to spend more on it. When the 5th Earl died in 1862 Barron bought 40 acres for a nursery site in nearby Borrowash, and moved there in 1865. Here, in addition to plant sales, Barron offered tree transplanting and landscape gardening. By 1867 he had been joined in partnership by his son, John Barron (1844-1906), who had trained abroad in landscape gardening, and the firm became 'W. Barron and Son', which became one of the most successful landscape gardening and nursery companies in Victorian Britain.

Barron's work at Elvaston Castle became famous when the gardens were opened to the public in the 1850s, leading to a topiary revival. As a result, he received numerous public and private commissions for parks, cemeteries and green spaces, including at Stancliffe Hall in Matlock; Nottingham Road Cemetery in Derby; Impney Hall in Droitwich; Craig-y-Nos Castle in Wales; Belper Cemetery in Derbyshire; Locke Park in Barnsley; Peel Park in Macclesfield (1854); Brunswick Park in Wednesbury; People's Park in Grimsby (1883), and, his most famous work after Elvaston Castle itself, Abbey Park, Leicester (between 1877 and 1882).

== Later years ==
Barron retired in 1881 but came out of retirement for a commission at Welbeck Abbey in 1886. In 1887 he was the first witness called before the select commission on forestry. He was noted for his prodigious memory, he was deeply religious, and he was a staunch supporter of and advocate for temperance.

His first wife, Sarah née Allester, died in 1858 aged 25 years of age, on 30 November 1841 at Elvaston in Derbyshire. Barron was listed as 'Widower.' He married Elizabeth Ashby, with whom he had a son, John Barron (1844-1906) and a daughter, Frances Barron (born 1842).

William Barron died at Borrowash in Derbyshire in April 1891. The family business continued into the inter-war years. He is buried in the small village cemetery in Borrowash.

== Legacy ==
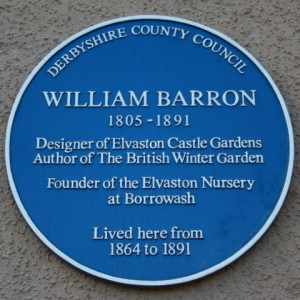
The blue plaque on the former home of William Barron in Borrowash

In 2012 a Derbyshire County Council blue plaque was unveiled on his former home on Nottingham Road in Borrowash where he lived from 1864 to 1891. His biography, William Barron, The Victorian Landscape Gardener by Tamsin Liddle and Peter Robinson was published by Amberley Publishing in 2022.
