= Charles Stanhope, 3rd Earl of Harrington =

British Army general

General The Right Honourable The Earl of Harrington GCH PC PC (Ire)
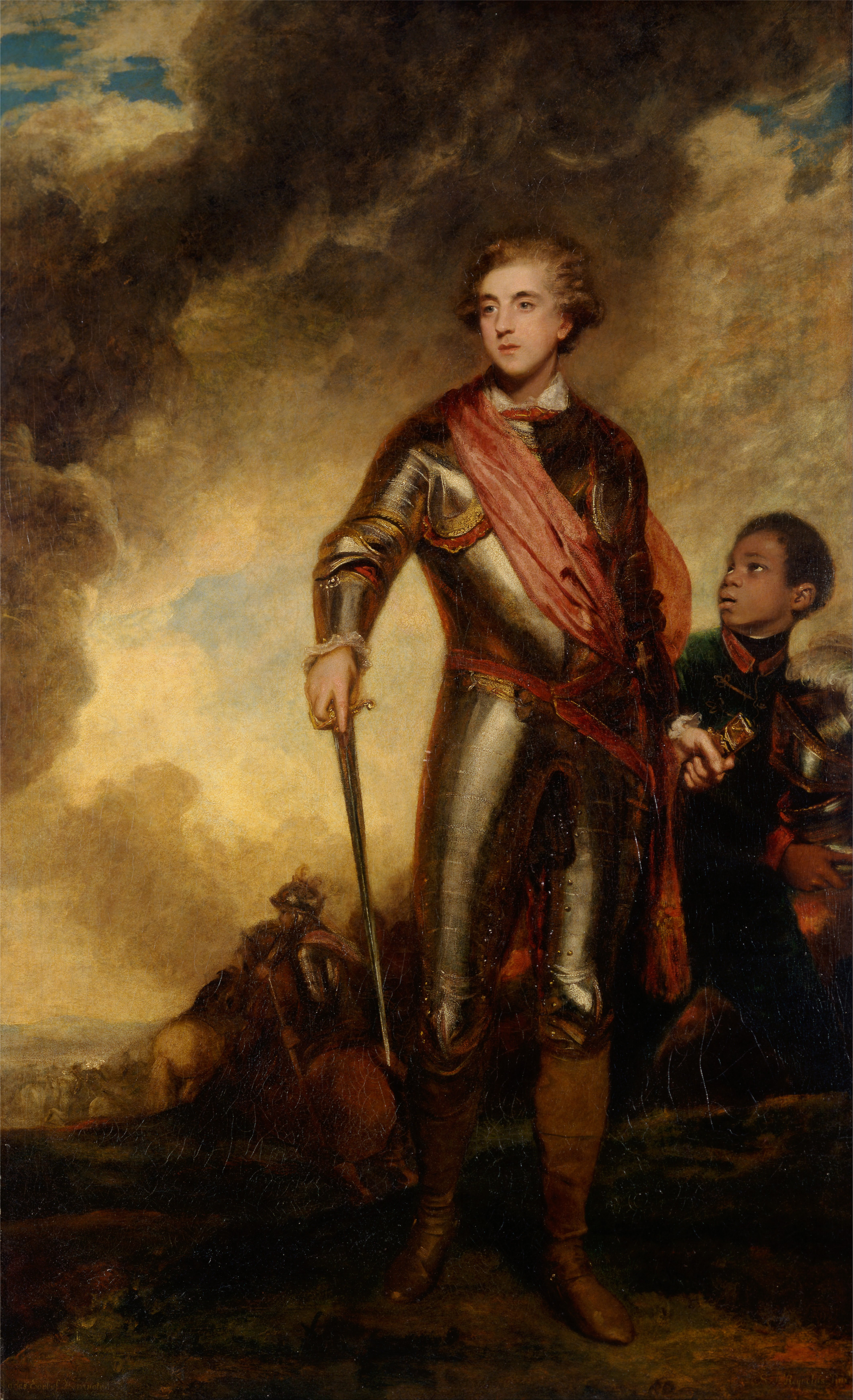
- Charles Stanhope, 3rd Earl of Harrington, by Joshua Reynolds, c. 1782
- Tenure: 1779–1829
- Predecessor: William Stanhope
- Successor: Charles Stanhope
- Other titles: Viscount Petersham; Baron Harrington; Knight Grand Cross, Royal Guelphic Order
- Born: Charles Stanhope; 17 March 1753
- Died: 5 September 1829 (aged 76); Brighton, East Sussex, England
- Buried: Elvaston, Derbyshire
- Residence: Elvaston Castle
- Wars and battles: American Revolutionary War
- Offices: Colonel of the 1st Regiment of Life Guards; Commander-in-Chief, Ireland; Constable and Governor of Windsor Castle; Member of Parliament for Thetford (1774); Member of Parliament for Westminster (1776–1779); Member of Her Majesty's Most Honourable Privy Council, Member of the Privy Council of Ireland
- Spouse: Jane Fleming (m. 1778; died 1824)
- Issue Detail: Charles Stanhope, 4th Earl of Harrington; Lincoln Edwin Robert Stanhope; Anna Russell, Duchess of Bedford; Leicester Stanhope, 5th Earl of Harrington; William Sefton George Stanhope; FitzRoy Henry Richard Stanhope; Francis Charles Stanhope; Henry William Stanhope; Caroline Anne Stanhope; Charlotte Augusta Stanhope; Augustus Henry Edward Stanhope
- Parents: William Stanhope, 2nd Earl of Harrington; Lady Caroline FitzRoy
- Occupation: Peer, soldier

General Charles Stanhope, 3rd Earl of Harrington, GCH, PC, PC (Ire) (17 March 1753 – 5 September 1829), styled Viscount Petersham until 1779, was a British Army officer and politician who sat in the House of Commons between 1774 and 1779 when he succeeded to the peerage as Earl of Harrington.

== Early life ==
Coat of Arms of the Earl of Harrington

Stanhope was the son of William Stanhope, 2nd Earl of Harrington, and Lady Caroline FitzRoy, daughter of Charles FitzRoy, 2nd Duke of Grafton, and Lady Henrietta Somerset, daughter of Charles Somerset, Marquess of Worcester, and Rebecca Child. He was educated at Eton.

== Military career ==
Stanhope was commissioned into the Coldstream Guards in 1769. During the Saratoga campaign of the American Revolutionary War as Viscount Petersham, he commanded the 29th Regiment of Foot's Grenadier company and was an aide-de-camp to General John Burgoyne.

He was Colonel of the 85th Regiment of Foot (1778–1783), the 65th Regiment of Foot (1783–1788) and the 29th Regiment of Foot (1788–1792). He was finally Colonel of the 1st Life Guards from 1792 to his death. He was promoted full general in 1803 and made GCH in 1821. From 1805 to 1812 he was Commander-in-Chief, Ireland, and he was sent on diplomatic errands to Vienna and to Berlin.

Viscount Petersham can be seen in the famous painting "The Burial of General Fraser at Saratoga" standing above Simon Fraser.

== Parliamentary career ==
He was briefly elected to serve as Member of Parliament for Thetford in 1774 and then sat from 1776 to 1779 as one of the members for Westminster.

== Family ==
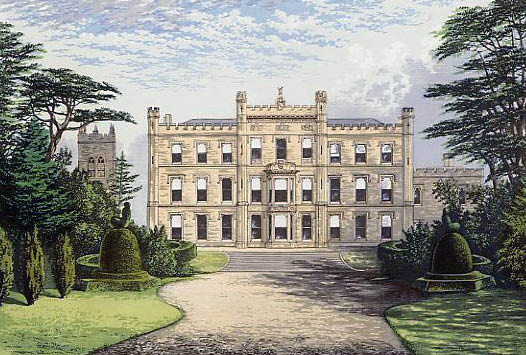
Elvaston Castle

Lord Harrington was married to Jane Fleming, daughter of Sir John Fleming, 1st Baronet, in 1778. She was an heiress of £100,000 and later became a Lady of the Bedchamber to Queen Charlotte. Lord and Lady Harrington had eleven children:

- Charles Stanhope, 4th Earl of Harrington (8 April 1780 – 3 March 1851). He was married to Maria Foote, daughter of Samuel Foote.
- Maj-Gen. Hon. Lincoln Edwin Robert Stanhope (26 November 1781 – 29 February 1840).
- Anna Maria Stanhope, Duchess of Bedford (3 September 1783 – 3 July 1857). She was married to Francis Russell, 7th Duke of Bedford.
- Leicester FitzGerald Charles Stanhope, 5th Earl of Harrington (2 September 1784 – 7 September 1862). He married Elizabeth Green, daughter of William Green and Ann Rose Hall.
- Hon. William Sefton George Stanhope (29 December 1785 – February 1786)
- Rev. Hon. FitzRoy Henry Richard Stanhope (24 April 1787 – 11 April 1864). Dean of St Buryan, Cornwall, and rector of Catton and of Wressle in Yorkshire. He married Caroline Wyndham, illegitimate daughter of the Hon. Charles Wyndham. They were parents of Charles Stanhope, 7th Earl of Harrington, his younger brother Percy Stanhope and of several other children.
- Maj. Hon. Sir Francis Charles Stanhope (29 September 1788 – 9 October 1862). He had three children by Hannah Wilson, daughter of James Wilson of Parsonstown Manor, County Meath.
- Rev. Hon. Henry William Stanhope (2 August 1790 – 21 June 1872). Rector of Gawsworth.
- Lady Caroline Anne Stanhope (20 November 1791 – 25 November 1853), married Edward Ayshford Sanford on 21 June 1841.
- Lady Charlotte Augusta Stanhope (15 February 1793 – 15 February 1859), married Augustus FitzGerald, 3rd Duke of Leinster, on 16 June 1818. They were parents to Charles FitzGerald, 4th Duke of Leinster, and another three children, including Lord Otho FitzGerald.
- Hon. Augustus Henry Edward Stanhope (25 March 1794 – 8 December 1831). On 8 May 1813, he married Jane Baldwin in the Parish Church of St John, Hampstead, under the name "Edward Stanhope" and disguised as a groom or labourer. The marriage was annulled in 1822 by reason of undue publication of banns (26 Geo. 2 c. 33).

Parliament of Great Britain
Preceded by Henry Seymour Conway; John Drummond	Member of Parliament for Thetford; 1774; With: Henry Seymour Conway	Succeeded by Charles FitzRoy; Charles FitzRoy-Scudamore
Preceded by Earl Percy; Lord Thomas Pelham-Clinton	Member of Parliament for Westminster; 1776–1779; With: Lord Thomas Pelham-Clinton	Succeeded by Lord Thomas Pelham-Clinton; Viscount Malden
Military offices
Preceded by The Viscount Cathcart	Commander-in-Chief, Ireland; 1806–1812	Succeeded by The Earl of Hopetoun
Preceded by The Lord Dover	Colonel of the 1st Regiment of Life Guards; 1792–1829	Succeeded by The Viscount Combermere
Preceded by William Tryon	Colonel of the 29th (Worcestershire) Regiment of Foot; 1788–1792	Succeeded by William Cathcart, 1st Earl Cathcart
Honorary titles
Preceded by The Earl of Cardigan	Constable and Governor of Windsor Castle; 1812–1829	Succeeded by The Marquess Conyngham
Peerage of Great Britain
Preceded by William Stanhope	Earl of Harrington; 1779–1829	Succeeded by Charles Stanhope
Preceded by William Stanhope	Baron Harrington; 1779–1829	Succeeded by Charles Stanhope
