= Jane Stanhope, Countess of Harrington =

British society hostess and heiress

The Right Honourable The Countess of Harrington
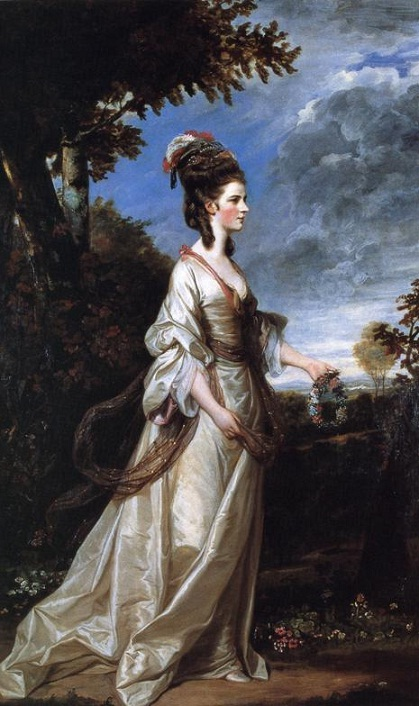
- The stylish Lady Harrington walking in pastoral nature by Joshua Reynolds c. 1775. Now at Harewood House
- Born: Jane Fleming; 23 May 1755
- Died: 3 February 1824 (aged 68)
- Noble family: Fleming (by birth); Stanhope (by marriage)
- Spouse: Charles Stanhope, 3rd Earl of Harrington (m. 1778)
- Issue: Charles Stanhope, 4th Earl of Harrington; Anna Russell, Duchess of Bedford; Leicester Stanhope, 5th Earl of Harrington
- Father: Sir John Fleming, 1st Baronet
- Mother: Jane Coleman
- Occupation: Socialite

Jane Stanhope, Countess of Harrington (née Fleming; 23 May 1755 – 3 February 1824), was a society hostess and heiress who served as a lady of the Bedchamber to the British queen Charlotte of Mecklenburg-Strelitz.

== Early life ==
Jane Fleming was the eldest of five children of Sir John Fleming, 1st Baronet, and his wife Jane (née Coleman), as well as the elder sister of the scandalous Seymour Dorothy Fleming. The death of her father in 1763 left her and her sisters co-heiresses to an enormous fortune of £100,000. At the age of 23, Jane Fleming became engaged to the two years older Charles Stanhope, Viscount Petersham, a war hero who had recently returned from North America to England. His father, the 2nd Earl of Harrington, was deeply indebted, however, and the legal negotiations between the two families led to the postponement of the marriage. By October 1778, rumours began circulating that the match would never actually take place. Lord Petersham became Earl of Harrington on his father's death the following April, and the marriage took place in at St Marylebone in London on 23 May.

== Marriage ==
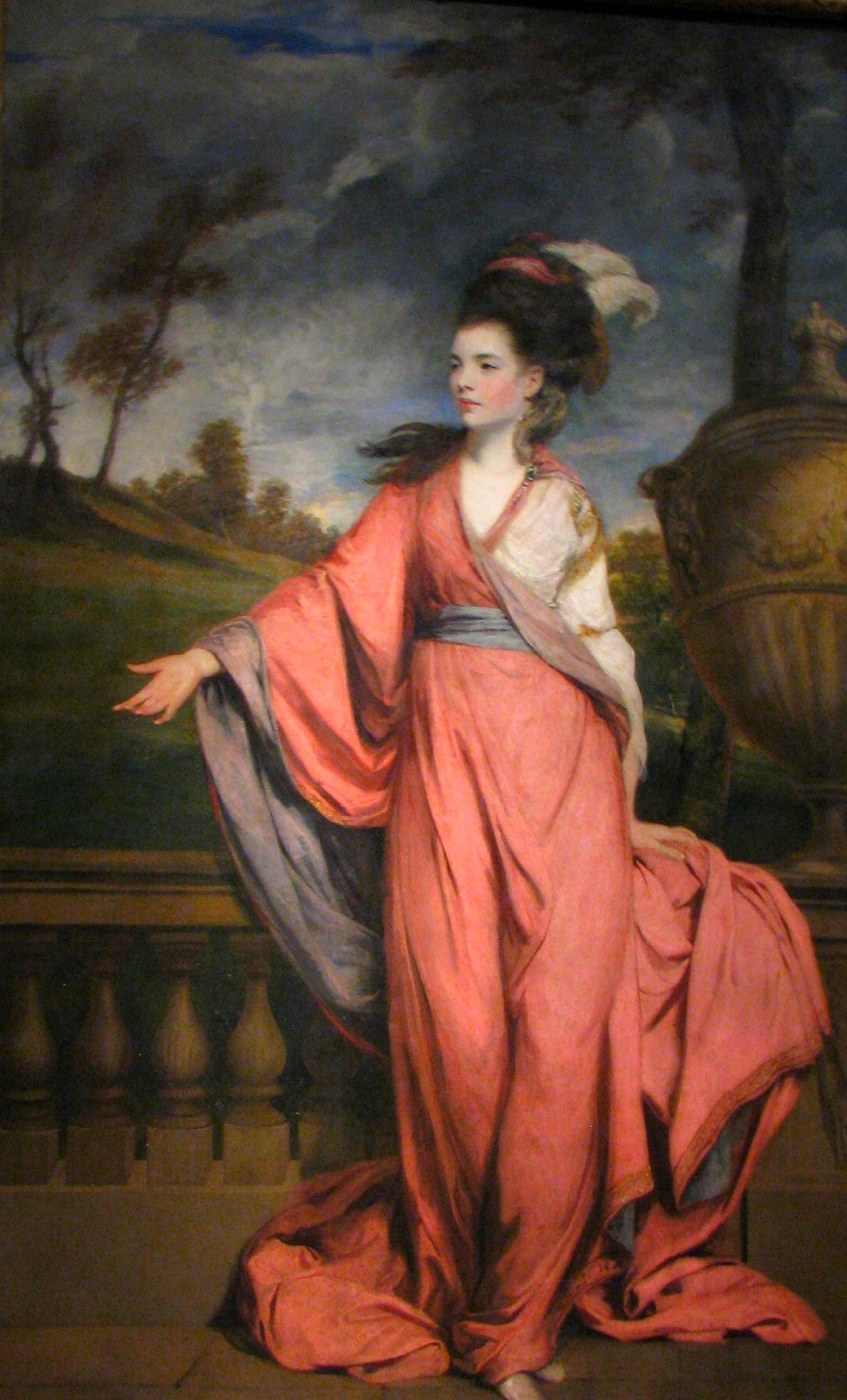
Countess of Harrington displaying an "air of icy self-confidence", as depicted by Sir Joshua Reynolds in c. 1778–1779.

The new Countess of Harrington was soon praised for generosity, as she immediately settled the debts her husband had inherited from her father-in-law and funded the re-purchase of Stable Yard House in St James's. The money she brought into the marriage also enabled Lord Harrington to raise an infantry regiment, with which the couple departed for Jamaica in 1780. When they returned the next year, Lady Harrington became noted for her fashion sense and physical attractiveness; she and Georgiana Cavendish, Duchess of Devonshire, were singled out as "the best dressed ladies" at an all-night party held by the Duchess in September 1782.

Although she became a gambler like many of her class, Lady Harrington was "blessed with domestic happiness, a lovely progeny, and every endearment that can make life desirable." Surrounded by aristocracy of generally loose morals, she was considered an epitome of virtue, while her younger sister scandalised the society by reportedly having sexual relations with 27 men other than her husband. She was often contrasted with her mother-in-law, Caroline Stanhope, Countess of Harrington, who was seen as a "fallen woman". A somewhat talented painter, Lady Harrington helped establish John Glover's career as art instructor in the early 1790s, and may have taken lessons from him. She was well acquainted with Sir Joshua Reynolds, who painted two famous portraits of her, as well as portraits of her mother, sister and brother-in-law Sir Richard Worsley. In 1794, she became a lady of the Bedchamber to Charlotte of Mecklenburg-Strelitz, wife of King George III. Much favoured by Queen Charlotte, Lady Harrington served as lady of the Bedchamber until the Queen's death in 1818.

== Old age ==
Lord and Lady Harrington maintained their popularity into their old age. "Their sempiternal occupation of tea-drinking" was noted by one of their contemporaries, who found that "neither in Nankin, Pekin, nor Canton was the teapot more assiduously and constantly replenished" than in their home. Lady Harrington predeceased her husband, dying at St James's Palace on 3 February 1824. She was buried at the Westminster Abbey on 12 February."

== Issue ==
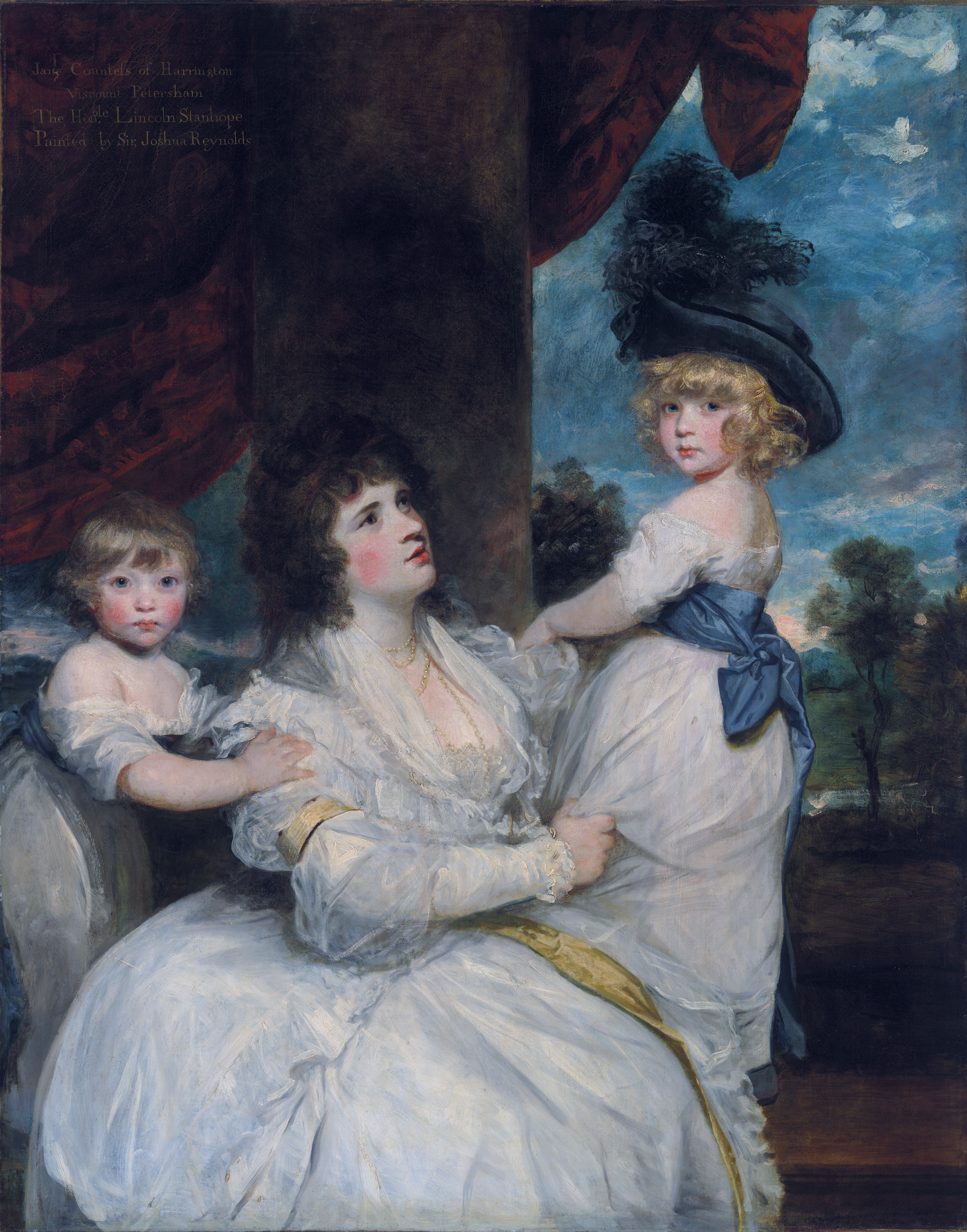
Lady Harrington with her sons, by Sir Joshua Reynolds.

- Charles Stanhope, 4th Earl of Harrington (8 April 1780 – 3 March 1851). He was married to Maria Foote, daughter of Samuel Foote.
- Maj-Gen. Hon. Lincoln Edwin Robert Stanhope (26 November 1781 – 29 February 1840).
- Anna Maria Stanhope, Duchess of Bedford (3 September 1783 – 3 July 1857). She was married to Francis Russell, 7th Duke of Bedford.
- Leicester FitzGerald Charles Stanhope, 5th Earl of Harrington (2 September 1784 – 7 September 1862). He married Elizabeth Green, daughter of William Green and Ann Rose Hall. His parents-in-law were residents of Jamaica.
- Rev. Hon. FitzRoy Henry Richard Stanhope (24 April 1787 – 11 April 1864). Dean of St Buryan, Cornwall, and Rector of Catton and of Wressle in Yorkshire. He married Caroline Wyndham, illegitimate daughter of the Hon. Charles Wyndham. They were parents of Charles Stanhope, 7th Earl of Harrington, his younger brother Percy Stanhope and of several other children.
- Maj. Hon. Sir Francis Charles Stanhope (29 September 1788 – 9 October 1862). He had three children by Hannah Wilson, daughter of James Wilson of Parsonstown Manor, County Meath.
- Rev. Hon. Henry William Stanhope (2 August 1790 – 21 June 1872). Rector of Gawsworth.
- Lady Caroline Anne Stanhope (20 November 1791 – 25 November 1853). She was married to Edward Ayshford Sanford.
- Lady Charlotte Augusta Stanhope (15 February 1793 – 15 February 1859). She was married to Augustus Frederick FitzGerald, 3rd Duke of Leinster. They were parents to Charles William FitzGerald, 4th Duke of Leinster, and another three children.
- Hon. Augustus Stanhope (25 March 1794 – 8 December 1831).
