= St Bartholomew's Church, Elvaston =

St Bartholomew’s Church, Elvaston
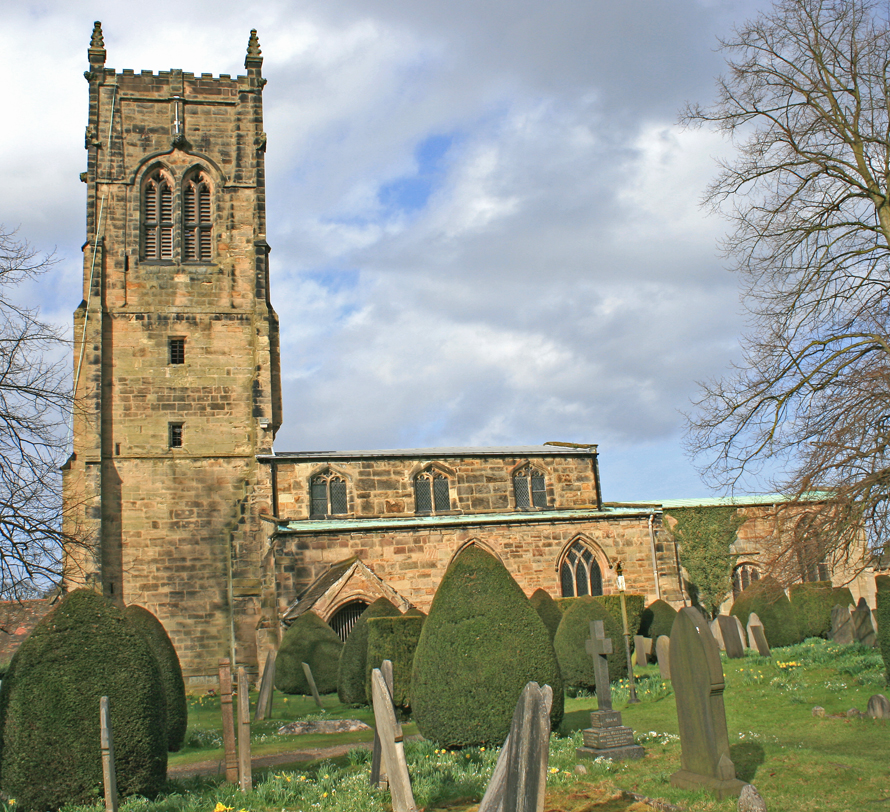
- St Bartholomew’s Church, Elvaston
- St Bartholomew’s Church, Elvaston
- 52°53′34″N 1°23′46″W
- Location: Elvaston, Derbyshire
- Country: England
- Denomination: Church of England

History
- Dedication: St Bartholomew

Architecture
- Heritage designation: Grade I listed

Administration
- Diocese: Diocese of Derby
- Archdeaconry: Derby
- Deanery: Melbourne
- Parish: Elvaston-cum-Thulston-cum-Ambaston

St Bartholomew's Church, Elvaston is a Grade I listed parish church in the Church of England in Elvaston, Derbyshire.

== History ==
The church dates from the 13th century, and was completed in 1474 with funding from Walter Blount, 1st Baron Mountjoy. The chancel was restored and lengthened by 11 feet (3.4 m) in 1904 by George Frederick Bodley. Some of the tombs and memorials were moved to give a better view of the altar. The new chancel has no window at the east end, but a large reredos of carved white clunch filled the whole end, which was richly carved with subjects and figures, and effectively lit by two new traceried windows of three lights each in the north and south walls of the sanctuary. The pavements of the sanctuary and chancel were laid with black and white marble. The floor of the nave was laid with wooden blocks, and the aisles with slate and white stone. The plaster was removed from the walls. The roofs and various parts of the walls were decorated with gold and blue, with monograms of "B" for St Bartholomew.

== Parish status ==
The church is in a joint parish with

- All Saints’ Church, Aston-upon-Trent
- St Wilfrid's Church, Barrow-upon-Trent
- St Andrew’s Church, Twyford
- St James’ Church, Swarkestone
- St James Church, Shardlow
- St Mary the Virgin’s Church, Weston-on-Trent

== Memorials ==
The church contains memorials to:

- Henry and Margaret Robinson (d. 1829)
- Elizabeth, Countess of Harrington (d. 1912)
- John Stanhope (d. 1638)
- Charles Stanhope, 3rd Earl of Harrington (d. 1829) by Antonio Canova
- Leicester Stanhope, 5th Earl of Harrington (d. 1862)
- Sydney Stanhope, 6th Earl of Harrington (d. 1866)
- Lieutenant Talbot FitzRoy Eden Stanhope (1896 – 1915)
- Algernon Russell Gayleard Stanhope (1838 – 1847)

== Organ ==
The church has a pipe organ by Eustace Ingram dating from 1904. A specification of the organ can be found on the National Pipe Organ Register.

== See also ==
- Grade I listed churches in Derbyshire
- Grade I listed buildings in Derbyshire
- Listed buildings in Elvaston, Derbyshire

== Sources ==
- Pevsner, Nikolaus; Williamson, Elizabeth (1978). Williamson, Elizabeth (ed.). Derbyshire. The Buildings of England (2nd ed.). Pevsner Architectural Guides. ISBN 978-0140710083.
