= Daniel Fleming =

Daniel Fleming may refer to:

- Sir Daniel Fleming, 5th Baronet (c. 1785–1821), of the Fleming baronets
- Daniel Fleming (antiquary) (1633–1701), English antiquary
- Daniel Fleming (rugby league) (born 1992), Welsh international
- Daniel E. Fleming (born 1957), American biblical scholar and Assyriologist
