= Listed buildings in Elvaston, Derbyshire =

Elvaston is a civil parish in the South Derbyshire district of Derbyshire, England. The parish contains 28 listed buildings that are recorded in the National Heritage List for England. Of these, one is listed at Grade I, the highest of the three grades, one is at Grade II*, the middle grade, and the others are at Grade II, the lowest grade. The parish contains the village of Elvaston and the surrounding area, including the country house Elvaston Castle, which is listed, together with associated structures and buildings in its grounds. The other listed buildings are houses and cottages, a church and associated structures, two mileposts, a former school and schoolmaster's house, and a war memorial.

== Key ==
Grade	Criteria
I	Buildings of exceptional interest, sometimes considered to be internationally important
II*	Particularly important buildings of more than special interest
II	Buildings of national importance and special interest

== Buildings ==
Name and location	Photograph	Date	Notes	Grade
St Bartholomew's Church; 52.89273°N 1.39647°W		13th century	The church has been altered and extended through the centuries, and the chancel was restored and extended in 1904–05 by G. F. Bodley. The church is built in stone, and has copper roofs, and consists of a nave with a clerestory, a south aisle, a south porch, a north chapel, a chancel with a north vestry and a west tower. The tower has three stages, chamfered bands, clasping buttresses, and a west doorway with a moulded surround and a four-centred arch, above which is a three-light window. The bell stage has pilaster strips, two-light bell openings, and an ogee-headed hood mould with a gargoyle finial. At the top is an embattled parapet with crocketed corner pinnacles and gargoyles.	I
Elvaston Castle; 52.89293°N 1.39527°W		17th century	A country house that has been altered and extended, particularly by James Wyatt in 1815–20, and by L. N. Cottingham in 1859–60. It is mainly in stone, with some red brick and some rendering, and has coved eaves, embattled parapets, and slate roofs. There are two and three storeys, and fronts of nine and seven bays. The south front has a central range of two storeys and five bays, and flanking three-storey bays. In the centre is a projecting porch with a four-centred arched doorway flanked by buttresses rising to embattled turrets, and rectangular windows with hood moulds. The left bay is flanked by octagonal turrets, and contains a three-light mullioned window in the ground floor, a canted oriel window above, and small windows in the top floor. The right bay is in brick, and has an octagonal turret on the right. It contains a two-storey canted bay window in front of which is a sundial, and above it is a mullioned and transomed window.	II*
Kiosk Cottage; 52.88316°N 1.39299°W		Early 18th century	A pair of cottages later combined into a house, in red brick with dentilled eaves bands, and a tile roof. There are two storeys, three bays, and a single-storey bay to the south. On the front is a gabled porch and a segmental-headed doorway, and to its left is a blocked segmental-headed doorway, In the ground floor are horizontal-sliding sash windows, and the upper floor contains casement windows. Inside, there is an inglenook fireplace.	II
Thurlaston Grange; 52.88113°N 1.38632°W		Early 18th century	A house that was later extended, in red brick, with a sill band, and a hipped roof in tile at the front and Welsh slate at the rear. There are two storeys, a T-shaped plan, and a front range of six bays. On the front is a Tuscan doorcase with a fanlight and a pediment. The windows are sashes with rusticated wedge lintels and double keystones. In the roof are three flat-roofed dormers containing casements.	II
Boat House, Elvaston Castle; 52.89302°N 1.39161°W		Mid 18th century	The boat house at the east end of the lake is in red brick, and has a tile roof with overhanging eaves and gables with decorative bargeboards. There are two storeys and a single bay. The lakeside front is open, and has a timber lintel with a central wooden pier, above which is a segmental-headed window. At the rear are pilaster strips, and a doorway with a window above, both with segmental heads.	II
Gate Piers and walls west of the Service Court, Elvaston Castle; 52.89324°N 1.39778°W		18th century	The gate piers are the older, with the walls dating from the 19th century. There are two piers 12 feet (3.7 m) high, and each has a moulded base, the west face is rusticated and has a carved frieze and a shield, and it has a moulded cornice and a large ball finial. The walls have ridgeback copings, and are ramped up towards the piers.	II
Golden Gates and walls, Elvaston Castle; 52.88917°N 1.39637°W		18th century	The gates were moved from Paris to the present site in the 19th century, and the outer railings were made to match, all in wrought iron. The gates and the flanking posts have scrolled panels, and the posts are surmounted by lanterns. Between the posts is an ornate overthrow with a coronet finial and an inscribed circle. The railings are on a stone plinth, and end in piers clad in marble, carrying statues of Hercules.	II
Gardens Farmhouse; 52.89029°N 1.39091°W		Mid 18th century	The farmhouse is in red brick with painted stone dressings, floor bands, an eaves band, and a tile roof. There are two storeys and attics, and three bays. The central doorway and the windows, which are sashes, have wedge lintels.	II
Ambaston Grange Farmhouse; 52.88211°N 1.35697°W		Late 18th century	The farmhouse is in red brick with a sawtooth eaves band and a tile roof. There are two storeys and attics, a main range of three bays, and a long rear range. In the centre is a gabled porch with bargeboards, and a doorway with a fanlight. The windows are casements with cambered heads, and there is a later roof light.	II
Nursery Garden walls and outbuildings, Elvaston Castle; 52.89098°N 1.38991°W		Late 18th century	The walls are in red brick with brick and stone dressings, and they enclose two rectangular areas. The earlier walls have stone copings, and the later walls are hollow to allow hot air to be pumped through. The west wall has an opening with wrought iron gates. The outbuildings have slate roofs, those to the north with two storeys, and contain a doorway, a bay window and horizontally-sliding sash windows. The central outbuildings have a single storey, and to the west is a tower-like structure.	II
Churchyard walls and curtain wall 52.89280°N 1.39596°W		Early 19th century	The wall along the west side of the churchyard is low, on a tapering plinth, with ridgeback copings. It contains a pair of stone piers, a flight of steps, and 18th-century wrought iron gates. The curtain wall is at right angles, and was designed by James Wyatt. It contains a chamfered pointed arch with machicolated embattled parapets, to the east is a two-storey tower with an embattled parapet, then a recessed section of walling, and a tower with an embattled corner turret. Following this is more walling containing a depressed pointed arch, and four-centred arched doorways.	II
Coach house and attached buildings, Elvaston Castle; 52.89309°N 1.39621°W		Early 19th century	The coach house, designed by James Wyatt in Tudor style, is in red brick and stone on a plinth, with embattled parapets and hipped Welsh slate roofs. In the centre is a rendered timber framed clock tower, containing a pointed arch over which is a three-light window. This is flanked by buttresses, and lower two-storey bays with blind pointed arches and two-light windows. Outside these are lower two-storey three-bay ranges, and all the windows have hood moulds.	II
Grotto, Elvaston Castle; 52.89424°N 1.39357°W		Early 19th century	The grotto is in stone and brick covered by tufa boulders. It has a large artificial mound with a viewing platform on the top, and a series of niches on the front. On each side are irregular arcades.	II
Information Centre and Shop, Elvaston Castle; 52.89297°N 1.39662°W		Early 19th century	A stable block later used for other purposes, it is in red brick with stone dressings, on a plinth, with a hipped slate roof. There are two storeys and seven bays, the middle five bays projecting, and a single-storey, single-bay wing on the east. The central bay and the recessed bays each contains a doorway with a four-centred arch, incised spandrels, and hood moulds. The windows in the ground floor are cross windows, and in the upper floor are two-light mullioned windows.	II
Pump house, Elvaston Castle; 52.89294°N 1.39180°W		Early 19th century	The pump house is in red brick on a stone plinth, with stone dressings, and a red tile roof with curving parapets rising to a point over the front gable. There is a single storey and a single bay. On the front is a doorway with a chamfered surround and a trefoil head, above which is a cinquefoil-headed niche containing a letter "H" and a coronet. To the east is an iron waterwheel surrounded by a brick wall with iron railings.	II
Sheep dip, Elvaston Castle; 52.89322°N 1.39660°W		Early 19th century	The sheep dip is in the service court. It consists of two curving red brick walls with stone dressings and low piers at the ends. Between the walls is a deep trough with 20th-century paving.	II
Stables west of the Coach House, Elvaston Castle; 52.89314°N 1.39705°W		Early 19th century	The stable range, later used for other purposes, is in brick with stone dressings, dentilled eaves, and roofs of tile and slate. There are 14 bay, the centre bay and a bay to the east with two storeys, and a single storey elsewhere. The central bay contains a segmental arch, and a segmental-arched opening and vents above. To the east is a four-centred arched doorway with incised spandrels and a hood mould, at the west is an extension with semicircular-arched doorways and a pedimented bay, and most of the other openings have segmental heads.	II
London Road Lodge entrance gates 52.88212°N 1.39846°W		Early 19th century	The entrance is in red brick with stone dressings. The iron gates are flanked by octagonal piers with molding cornices. Outside these are walls with string courses, and embattled parapets with ridgeback copings. Each wall contains a doorway with a chamfered surround, a hood and a gate. At the ends of the walls are projecting lodges with embattled parapets and containing mullioned windows.	II
Milepost at SK 399 321; 52.88563°N 1.40781°W	—	Early 19th century	The milepost is by a roundabout on Shardlow Road. It is in cast iron, and of the bobbin type, with a narrow cylindrical stem, and a wider cylindrical head with a moulded top. The stem is inscribed with the maker's name and the top with the distances to London and Derby.	II
Milepost at SK 414 315; 52.87944°N 1.38629°W	—	Early 19th century	The milepost is on the south side of the B5010 road. It is in cast iron, and of the bobbin type, with a narrow cylindrical stem, and a wider cylindrical head with a moulded top. The stem is inscribed with the maker's name and the top with the distances to London and Derby.	II
Springthorpe Cottage, Elvaston Castle; 52.89334°N 1.39766°W		c. 1840	A lodge cottage in red brick on a stone plinth, with stone dressings and a slate roof with curving parapets rising to a point over the front gable. There is a single storey, and a single bay with a lean-to. On the front is a doorway with a chamfered surround and a trefoil head, flanked by cinquefoil-headed windows. Above the doorway is a cinquefoil-headed niche containing a letter "H" and a coronet. There are cinquefoil-headed windows on the other fronts, and a trefoil-headed doorway at the rear.	II
Farmbuildings west of St Bartholomew's Church; 52.89281°N 1.39743°W		Mid 19th century	A group of farm buildings, later used for other purposes, in red brick and some stone, with dentilled eaves and hipped tile roofs. They are mainly in a single storey, with parts in two storeys, and they form a U-shaped plan. Most of the openings have segmental arches, and attached to the west is a four-bay range of cow sheds.	II
The Kennels, Elvaston Castle; 52.89266°N 1.39927°W		Mid 19th century	Two cottages and kennels, later used for other purposes, in red brick with stone dressings, and slate roofs with decorative bargeboards. The buildings surround a courtyard, which is closed by a wall on the south. The ranges have single storeys, with cottages at the north corners that have a single storey and attics, and two bays each. Attached to the eastern cottage is a pavilion with five horseshoe open arches on colonnettes, and a central iron column carrying a pyramidal roof. Most of the openings in the cottages and ranges have segmental-arched heads.	II
Village Hall and house 52.88931°N 1.39301°W		1852	Originally a school and schoolmaster's house, it is in red brick with yellow brick headers and stone dressings, on a plinth, and has a tile roof with pierced bargeboards. There is a single storey, with a three-bay former school at the left, the house on the right is at right angles, and between them is a three-storey tower with an embattled parapet. The middle bay of the school has a gable containing a moulded plaque with a crest, and a mullioned and transomed window, and the windows in the outer bays are mullioned.	II
Moorish Temple and Terrace, Elvaston Castle; 52.89117°N 1.39643°W		c. 1860	A garden pavilion in stone with dressings in concrete and tile, and a swept felted roof with overhanging eaves and decorative bargeboards. There is a single storey on a basement, and a single bay. The basement is tapering, and the side walls curve towards the top. On the north front is a niche in the basement, above is a large circular window with diagonal tracery, and in front is an iron balcony with shell motifs. The east and west fronts contain oval windows with diagonal tracery. On the south side is a raised terrace, and steps lead to a doorway with a trefoil head, above which is a niche with a large "H" and a coronet.	II
The Clock House; 52.88897°N 1.39196°W		c. 1860	The house, built as flats, is in red brick with stone dressings, bands, and slate roofs with coped gables, moulded kneelers, and crested ridge tiles. There are two storeys and attics, and three bays. The main front has a central doorway with a moulded surround, a four-centred arched head with incised spandrels, a large lintel, and a hood mould. The outer bays contain two-storey bay windows, and above the doorway are single-light windows and a coat of arms. The attics contain half-dormers; in the middle bay with a tall shaped gable and a flame finial, and the outer bays with simple gables. The front facing the street has three gables, a central doorway with a moulded surround, and mullioned windows. Below the central attic window is a clock face.	II
Stable Block east of The Kennels, Elvaston Castle; 52.89288°N 1.39813°W		1870	The stable range is in red brick with dressings in blue and yellow brick, dentilled eaves, and slate roofs. There is a single storey and three bays. The central bay is gabled and flanked by pilaster strips, and contains a round-arched doorway with a fanlight, above which is a datestone and a small circular opening. The outer lean-to bays each contains a segmental-arched doorway and a stable door.	II
War memorial 52.88744°N 1.39152°W		1923	The war memorial is in a hedged enclosure by a road junction. It is in stone, and consists of a rough-hewn Celtic wheel cross on a tapering shaft, on a three-stage octagonal base. The front has an inscription and the names of those lost in the First World War, and on the base are the names of those lost in the Second World War.	II
