= Fleming baronets =

Set index for Fleming baronets

There have been three baronetcies created for persons with the surname Fleming, one in the Baronetage of Nova Scotia, one in the Baronetage of England and one in the Baronetage of Great Britain. As of 2026 one creation is extant.

- Fleming baronets of Farme (1661)
- Fleming, later le Fleming baronets, of Rydal (1705): see le Fleming baronets
- Fleming baronets of Brompton Park (1763): see Sir John Fleming, 1st Baronet (c. 1701–1763)
