= Sir John Fleming, 1st Baronet =

Irish baronet

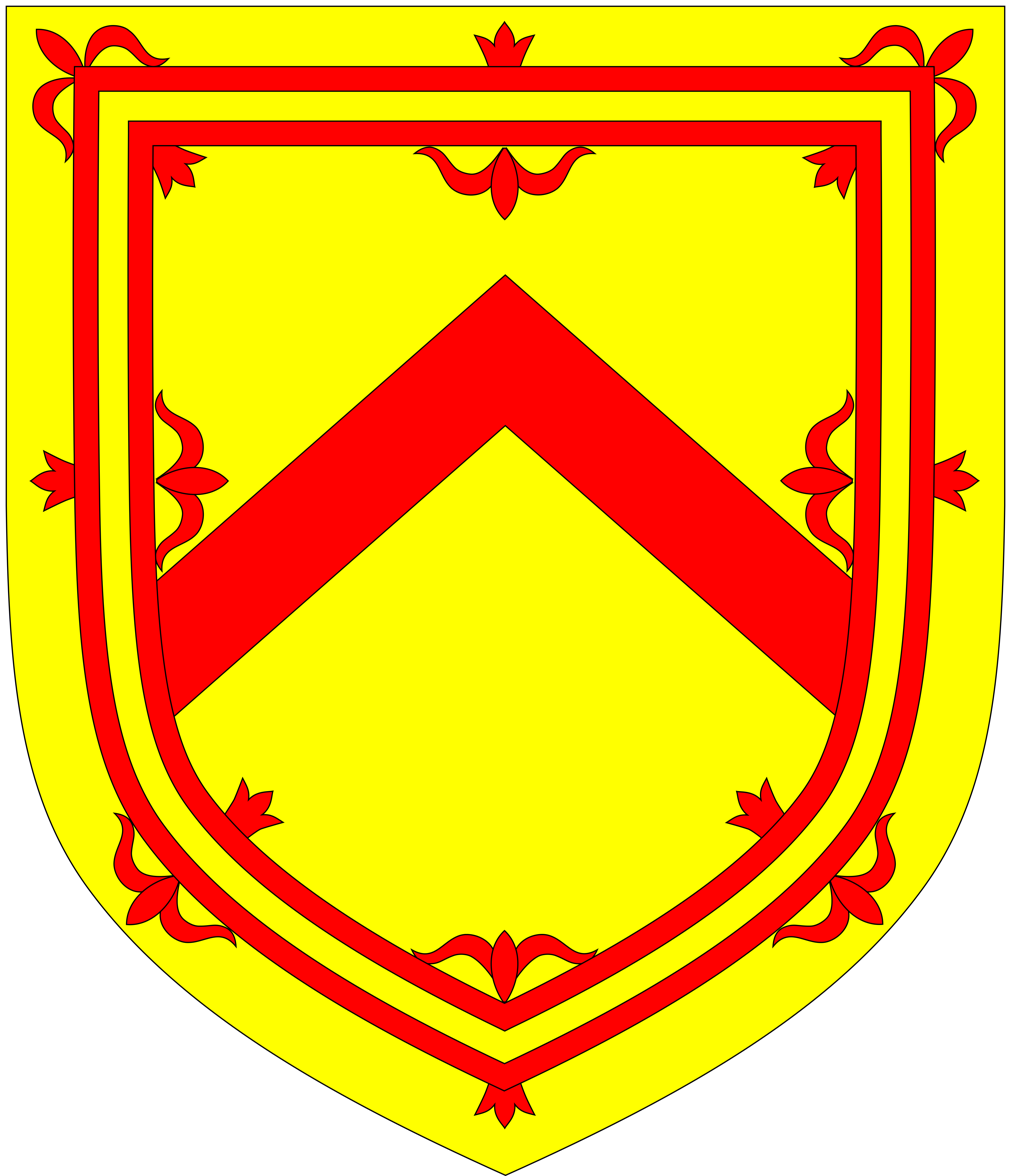
Arms of Fleming: (Baron Fleming (or Baron Slane)): Or, a chevron within a double tressure flory counter-flory gules. These arms were borne as an inescutcheon of pretence by Charles Harrington, 3rd Earl Harrington, husband of the 1st baronet's daughter and co-heiress Jane Harrington

Sir John Fleming, 1st Baronet (born c.1730, died 6 November 1763) was an Anglo-Irish baronet, created first Baronet Fleming. of Brompton Park in the County of Middlesex in the Baronetage of Great Britain on 22 April 1763.

He married Jane Coleman, daughter of William Coleman and Jane Seymour, in 1753. His elder daughter Jane married Charles Stanhope, 3rd Earl of Harrington. His younger daughter Seymour Dorothy Fleming (1758–1818) was involved in a scandalous separation from her husband Sir Richard Worsley. Lady Fleming remarried in 1770 to a rich sexagenarian born in Barbados, Edwin Lascelles, 1st Baron Harewood.

Baronetage of Great Britain
New creation	Baronet (of Brompton Park); 1763	Extinct
Preceded by Blakiston baronets	Fleming baronets of Brompton Park; 22 April 1763	Succeeded by Mayne baronets
