= People's Park, Grimsby =

Park in Grimsby, England

Coordinates: 53°33′23″N 0°05′04″W

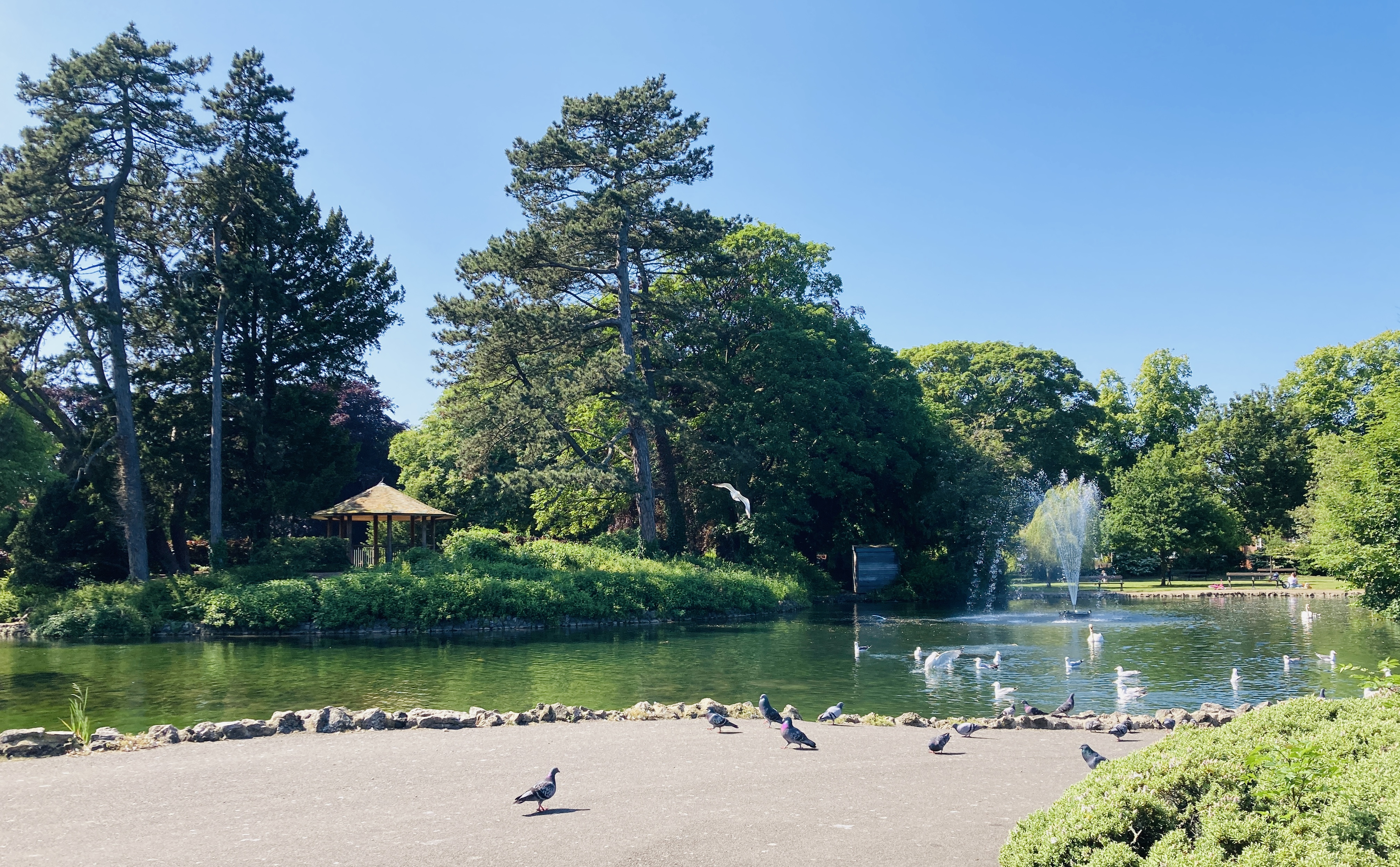
People's Park in Grimsby in 2023

People's Park is a late 19th-century public park in Grimsby, Lincolnshire, England laid out in a residential area south of the town centre. The park is Grade II* listed as, although enhanced, the park's design is essentially unchanged from its original layout of the early 1880s.

== History ==
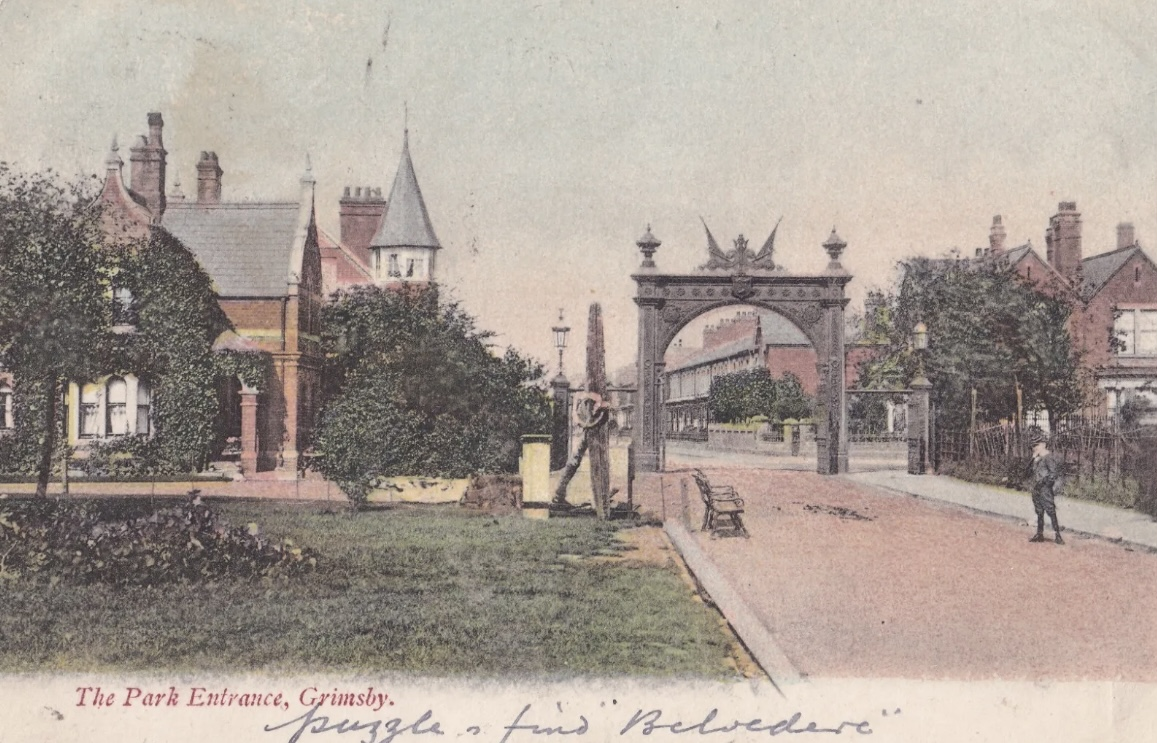
The gates were erected in 1884 and taken down in 1943

In 1881 Edward Heneage offered land between Welholme Road and Weelsby Road in Grimsby for the purpose of establishing a public park in Grimsby. In 1882 a Park Committee commissioned the planting of a double avenue of trees around the park. In 1883 a competition was held for the design of People's Park, which was won by the gardener, nurseryman and landscape gardener William Barron (1805–1891). His design, 'Semper Paratus' ('Always Ready'), laid out strong axis and curvilinear paths. The Park was opened by the Duke and Duchess of Connaught on 17 August 1883 during which they planted a tree, an event pictured in The Illustrated London News.

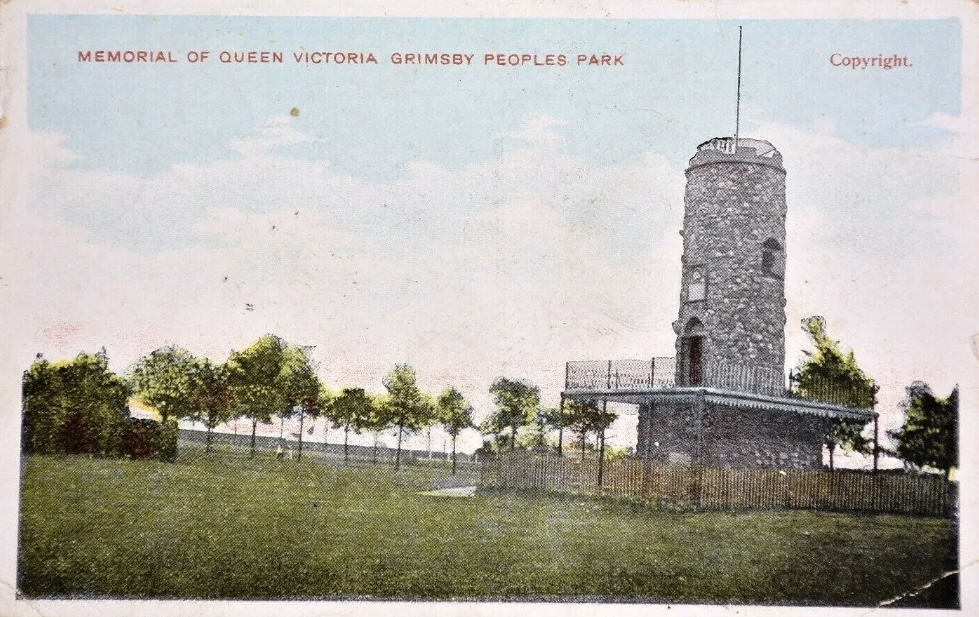
The Observatory commemorated the 80th birthday of Queen Victoria

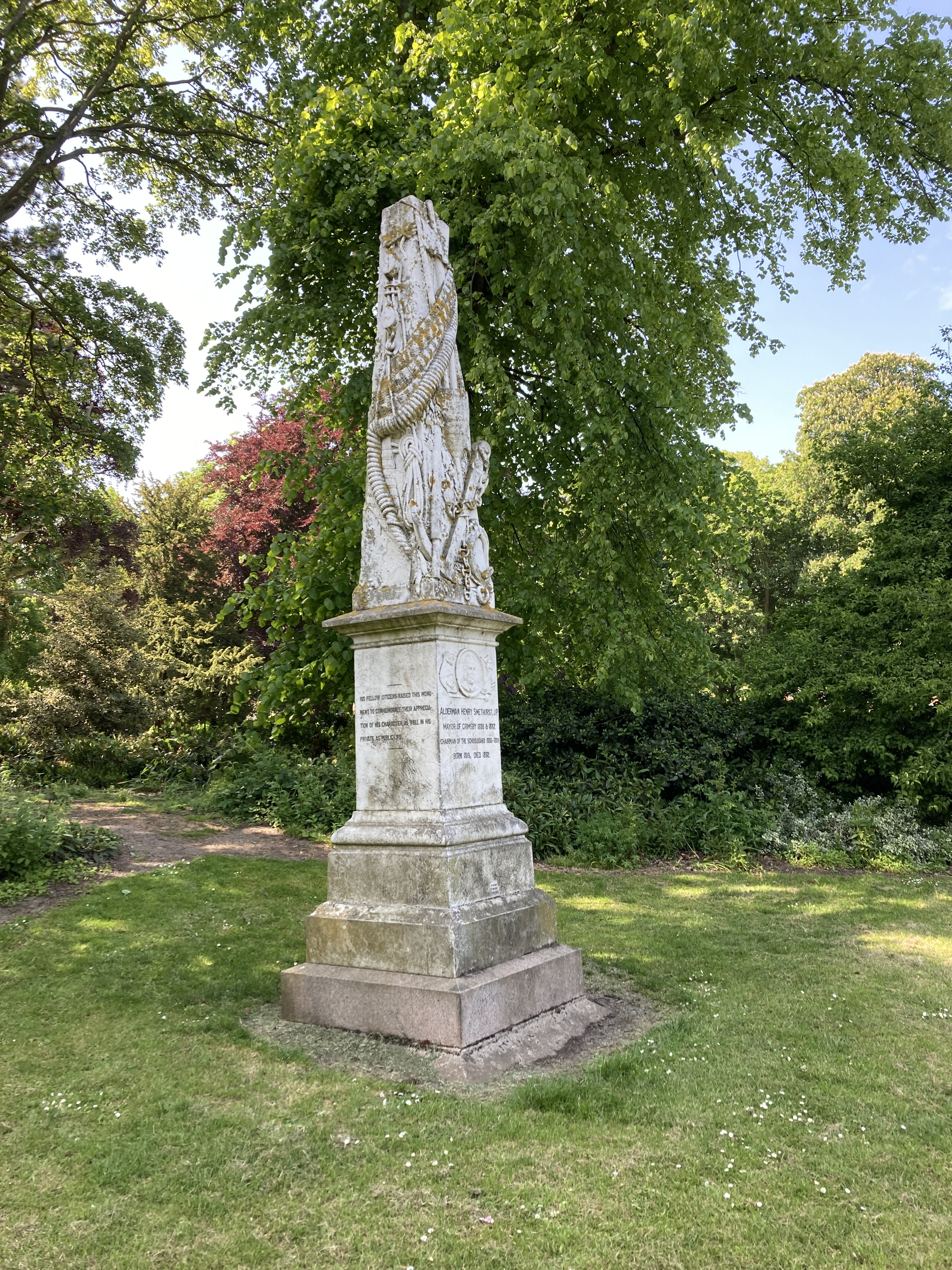
The Smethurst Memorial of 1894 in 2023

In 1884 two large arched entrance gates at the two junctions to Park Drive and Welholme Road were erected with a plaque detailing the gift of the land by Heneage. These dramatic entrance features were built be Young & Akridd of Hull for £150 per set in 1884. The gates unfortunately were removed in 1943 due to the war effort. It is believed the gates were a standard design produced by Grahamston Iron Company Ltd, Falkirk, Scotland. The entrance gates provided a grand entrance to the houses built facing the park and gave a feeling of privacy to the residents. In 1887 a Glass House was built, which today has been replaced by the Floral Hall, while in 1889 a drinking fountain was installed, paid for by public subscription. In 1894 the Smethhurst Memorial was unveiled. This commemorates Alderman Henry Smethurst (1819–1892), Mayor of Grimsby in 1886 and 1887. The monument is Grade II listed.

In 1900 the Observatory was built to commemorate the 80th birthday of Queen Victoria; this was demolished in 1949. In 1911 a Commemorative Avenue was planted in honour of the coronation of George V, which is largely intact today, while in 1918 the original Aviary was built. The current Aviary is a replacement.

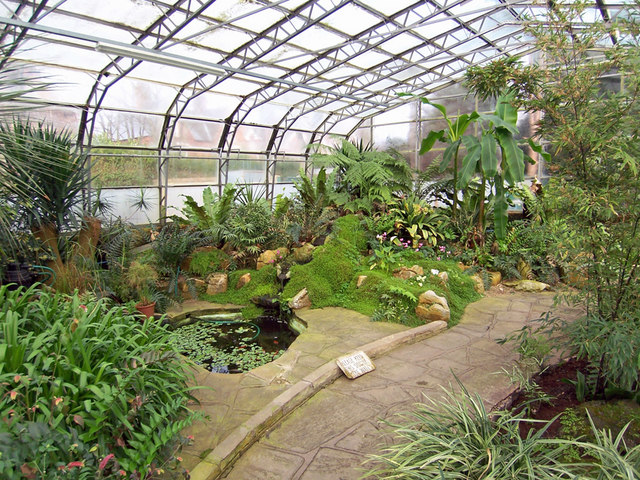
The Floral Hall

From 1919 to 1930 a World War I tank was displayed in the Park, and in 1928 whale jawbones were installed near one of the entrances; this feature was subsequently lost. In 1973 a new fountain was installed in the lake, and in 1975 the new Floral Halls were built containing tropical, temperate and cool sections. In 1980 the Circular Garden was made into a play area, and in 1990 a new bandstand was erected on the site of the old rustic timber one. In 1992 the old lodge (built in about 1885–89) by the gate was demolished and was replaced by a chalet for the use of the park keeper.

== Design ==
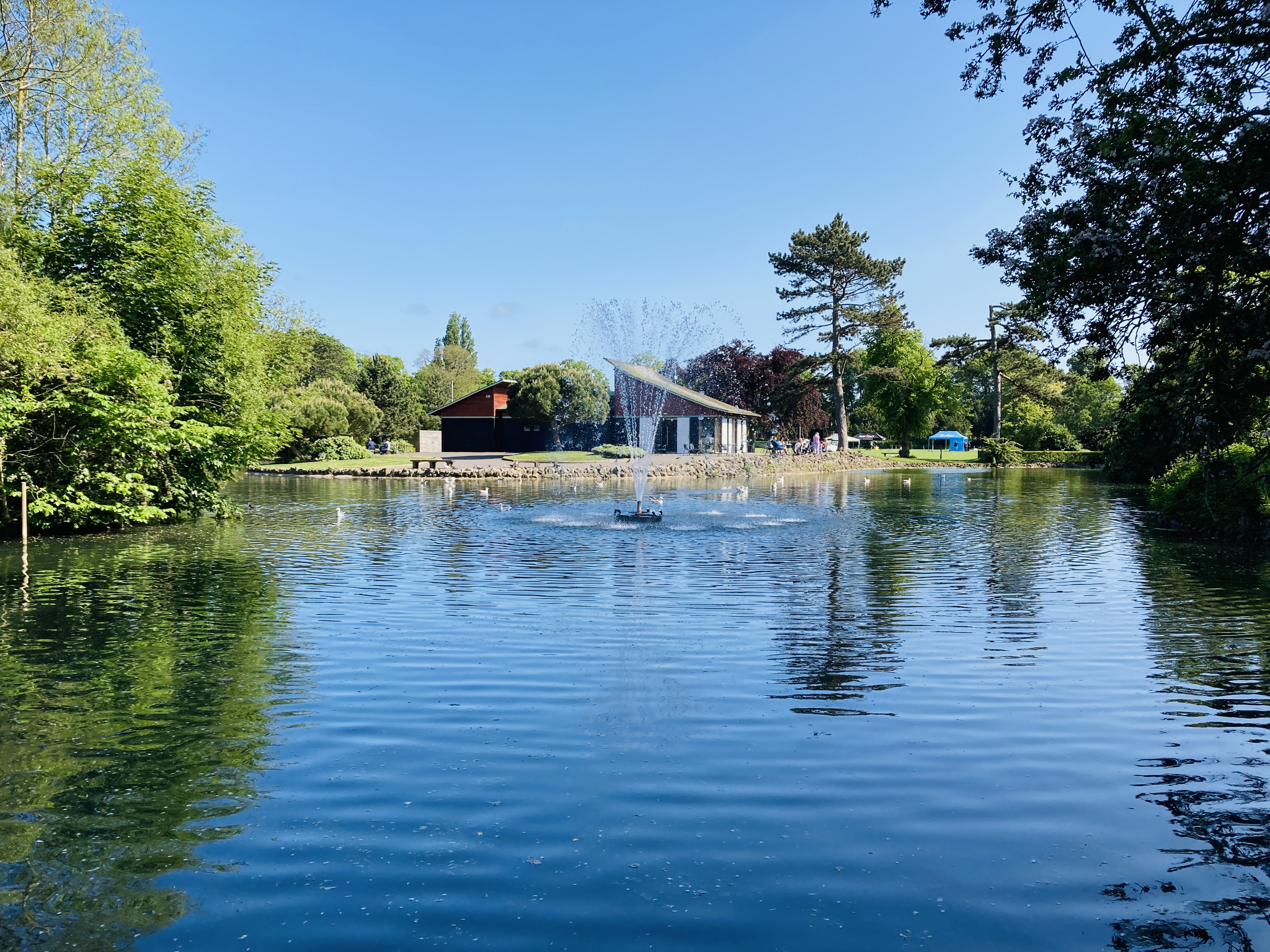
View across the lake in People's Park in Grimsby (2023)

The idea of a public park in Grimsby was first proposed in about 1860, and in 1869 the 'Great Grimsby Improvement Act' was set up. Mr Billing, the Superintendent of Grimsby Cemetery, was responsible for organising the planting of about 700 trees, including about 120 elm trees, about 240 lime trees, about 120 sycamore trees, and about 120 chestnut trees. These trees had been purchased and planted before the winning design to lay out the new park had been decided. Of the 24 designs submitted the winning design was that of William Barron and Son of the Elvaston Nurseries in Derbyshire, who was awarded the contract in June 1882. William Barron's design was a figure of eight with the top loop in the north containing the lake and various mounds, made with the soil dug out to create the lake, together with clusters of trees and shrubs. The loop in the south was rather more flat and provided areas for the cricket pitch and other sporting and recreational facilities. The lake contains mallard, coot, moorhen and geese.

The park opened in August 1883 and is located within an older residential area in south Grimsby where the houses date from the 1890s to the 1930s. Its area is about 9.3 hectares (23 acres). In 1883 a Mr Bennie of Hull received instructions to install iron railings around the main body of the park, and the 1889 Ordnance Survey map shows that railings were put up along the northern side of the park, separating the park from the road. Today, the park's perimeter is almost totally open, with the exception of a fence and hedge running along the north-east perimeter of the park for about 130 metres to protect the Aviary and Floral Hall.
