= Charles Stanhope, 4th Earl of Harrington =

English peer

- 4th Earl of Harrington
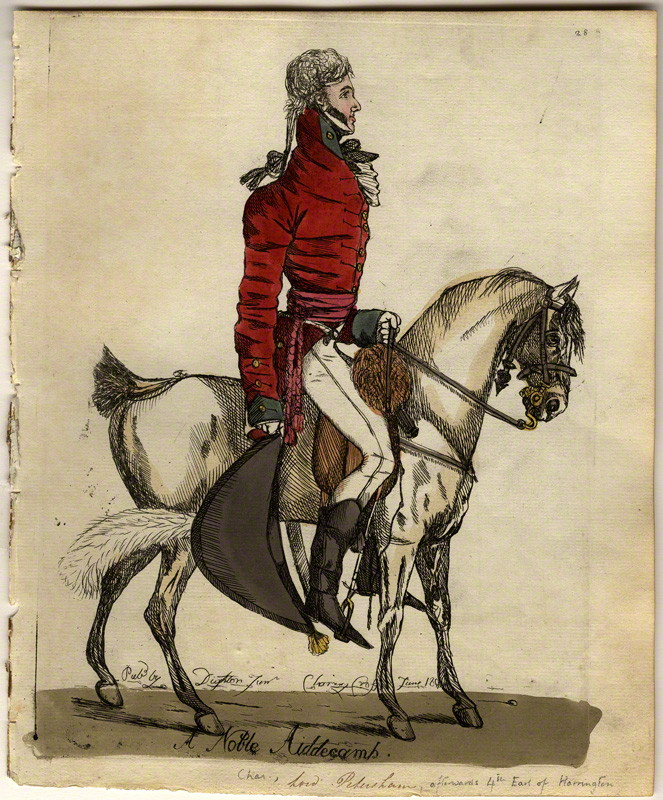
- "A noble aiddecamp", a contemporary etching of Charles Stanhope, 4th Earl of Harrington
- Tenure: 1829–1851
- Predecessor: Charles Stanhope, 3rd Earl of Harrington
- Successor: Leicester Stanhope, 5th Earl of Harrington
- Other titles: Viscount Petersham; Baron Harrington
- Born: Charles Stanhope; 8 April 1780
- Died: 3 March 1851 (aged 70)
- Residence: Elvaston Castle
- Spouse: Maria Foote
- Issue: Charles Stanhope, Viscount Petersham; Lady Jane St. Maur Blanche Stanhope
- Parents: Charles Stanhope, 3rd Earl of Harrington; Jane Fleming
- Occupation: Peer, soldier

Major-General Charles Stanhope, 4th Earl of Harrington (8 April 1780 – 3 March 1851), styled Viscount Petersham until 1829, was an English peer and man of fashion.

Petersham, the 3rd Earl of Harrington's eldest son, was a Regency era buck. He was educated at Eton from 1793 until 1795 on 7 December of that year, on 10 March 1812, he was appointed a Gentleman of the Bedchamber to King George III. He continued to serve in that post under King George IV until 1820. The family home in London was Harrington House.

Viscount Petersham spoke with a kind of lisp. Never seen in public before 6:00 pm, 'Beau' Petersham was a trendsetter. He attracted the attention and friendship of the then Prince regent who emulated his clothes, his tea drinking and his addiction to snuff. Lord Petersham's sitting room contained a variety of teas and snuff. He owned 365 snuff boxes and used a different one on each day of the year.

Tall and handsome, Lord Petersham was said to resemble Henry IV; he emphasised the likeness by growing a small pointed beard and dressing like Henry. He designed many of his own clothes and his fashions were quickly copied. He gave his name to the Harrington hat and Petersham overcoat. The Prince Regent ordered an overcoat in the Petersham style for each day of the week. Viscount Petersham was famous for the brown colour of his coach, clothing, and his servant's livery.

Petersham was almost fifty when he acceded to the Stanhope family title. He finally married, in 1831, Maria Foote, the Covent Garden actress, seventeen years his junior. Their affair had met with the old Earl's disapproval and had been the gossip of London and Derbyshire for several years. The 4th Earl of Harrington had William Barron landscape the park at Elvaston Castle, his father's Gothic confection by James Wyatt. Lewis Cottingham redecorated Wyatt's original entrance hall. Renamed the Hall of the Fair Star it was dedicated to the chivalrous pursuit of love. The new Countess was in her element in this make-believe world of chivalry.

The 4th Earl and Maria had two children:

- Charles Stanhope, Viscount Petersham (13 December 1831 – 8 April 1836)
- Lady Jane St. Maur Blanche Stanhope (14 May 1833 – 28 November 1907), married George Conyngham, 3rd Marquess Conyngham. They were the maternal grandparents of John Combe.

Upon his death, the earl was succeeded by his brother, Leicester Stanhope, 5th Earl of Harrington.

Australian tea company The Devotea has offered a tea named after him since 2010. 'Lord Petersham' is their biggest selling blend in North America. They also named one after his sister Anna Russell, the Duchess of Bedford.

Coat of Arms of the Earls of Harrington

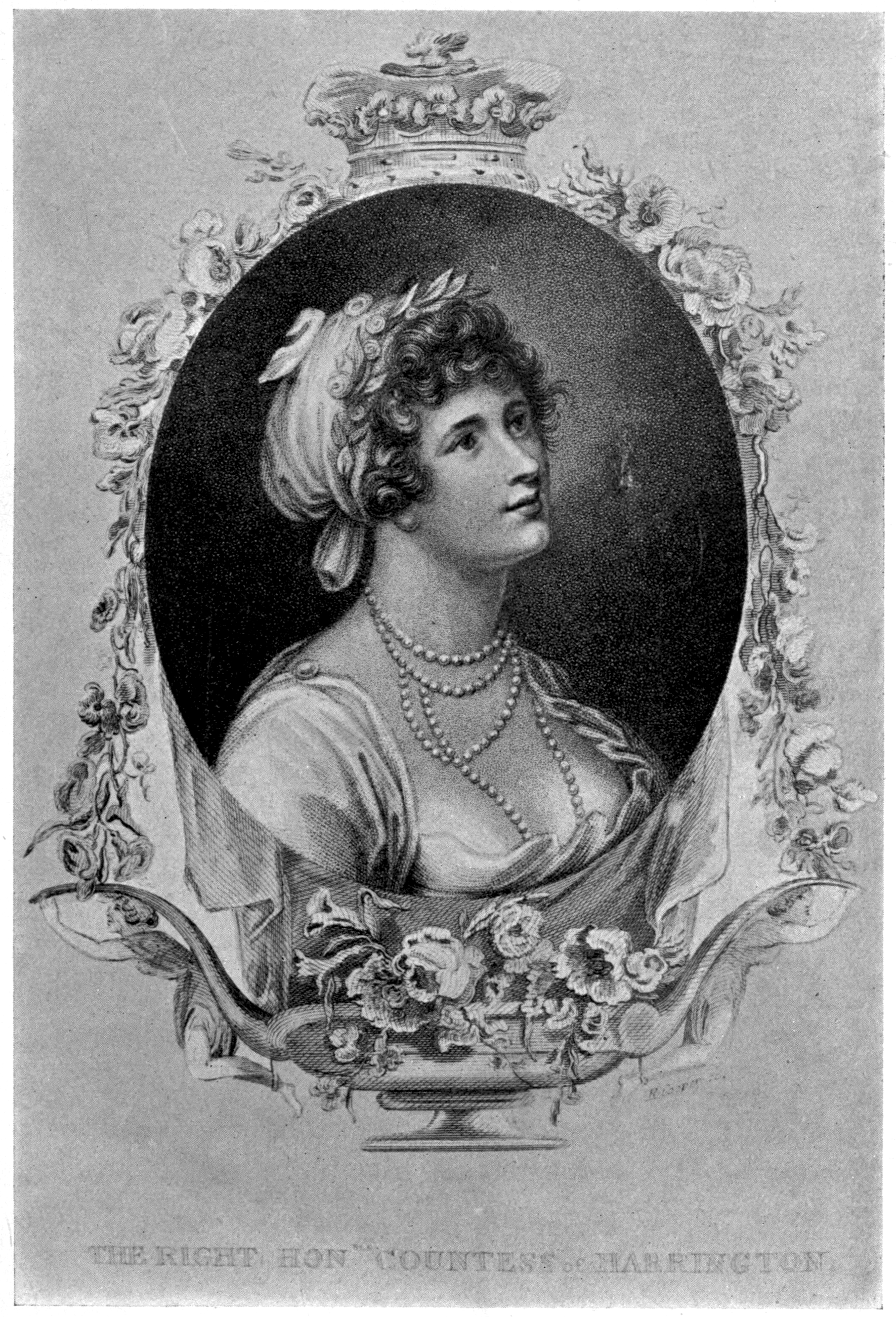
Maria Foote, afterwards Countess of Harrington; From an engraved portrait in the collection of A. M. Broadley, Esq.

Peerage of Great Britain
Preceded by Charles Stanhope	Earl of Harrington; 1829–1851	Succeeded by Leicester Stanhope
Preceded by Charles Stanhope	Baron Harrington; 1829–1851	Succeeded by Leicester Stanhope
