= Fleming baronets of Farme (1661) =

Escutcheon of the Fleming baronets of Farme

The Fleming baronetcy, of Farme in the County of Glasgow, was created in the Baronetage of Nova Scotia on 25 September 1661 for Archibald Fleming, Commissary of Glasgow in 1637. The title became either extinct or dormant on the death of the 7th Baronet in 1764.

== Fleming baronets, of Farme (1661) ==
- Sir Archibald Fleming, 1st Baronet (died 1662)
- Sir William Fleming, 2nd Baronet (1639–1707)
- Sir Archibald Fleming, 3rd Baronet (died 1714)
- Sir Archibald Fleming, 4th Baronet (died 1738)
- Sir Gilbert Fleming, 5th Baronet (died c. 1740)
- Sir William Fleming, 6th Baronet (1699–1746)
- Sir Collingwood Fleming, 7th Baronet (died 1764)
