= Lewis Nockalls Cottingham =

British architect

Lewis Nockalls Cottingham (1787 – 13 October 1847) was a British architect who pioneered the study of Medieval Gothic architecture. He was a restorer and conservator of existing buildings. He set up a Museum of Medieval Art in Waterloo Road, London with a collection of artefacts from demolished buildings and plaster casts of the medieval sculpture.

== Biography ==
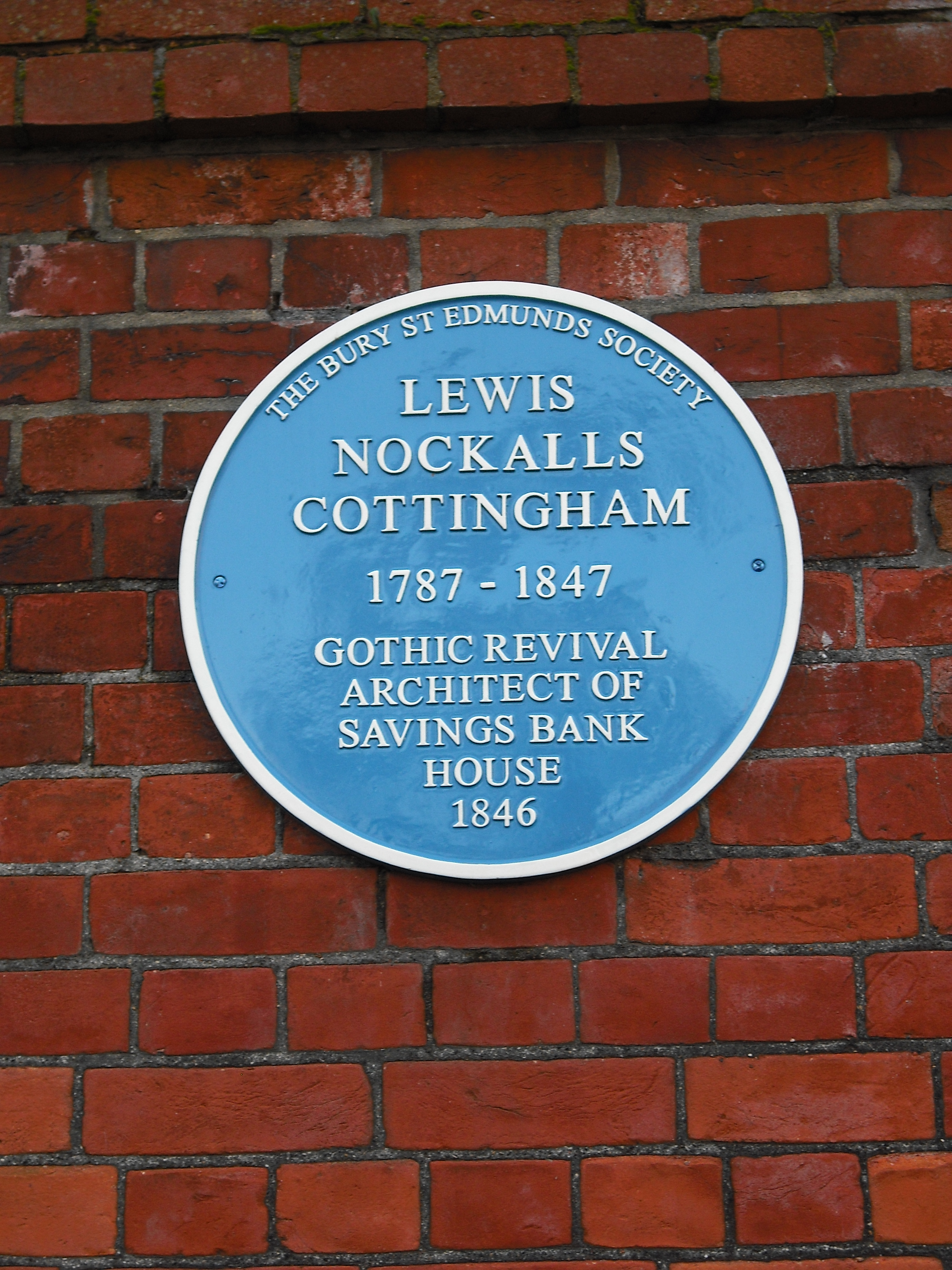
Plaque to Cottingham at Bury St Edmunds.

Cottingham was born in 1787 at Laxfield in Suffolk of a respectable family. He showed a talent for science and the arts early and he was apprenticed to a builder at Ipswich. After several years he moved to London and there placed himself with an architect and surveyor. He commenced his professional career in 1814 at his residence near Lincoln's Inn Fields. Cottingham's first public appointment was as architect and surveyor to the Cooks Company in 1822. Soon after this he erected a mansion in the perpendicular style of Gothic architecture for John Harrison at Snelston Hall in Derbyshire. In 1825 he became architect to Rochester Cathedral.

Between 1814 and 1822, he published several works illustrating medieval English architecture, including a set of plans of Westminster Hall (1822) and a larger work on Henry VII's Chapel. Charles Locke Eastlake described his working drawings of Gothic ornaments as "ill-selected and coarse in execution, but curious as being perhaps the first full-size illustrations of Mediaeval carving published in this form".

Cottingham won a competition to remodel the interior of the Chapel of Magdalen College, Oxford; work started in July 1829 and lasted at least six years; in the course of the restoration, a great deal of seventeenth and eighteenth century work was stripped away.

George Truefitt studied with Cottingham as an apprentice from 1839 to 1844, after which he worked briefly for two other members of the profession. Calvert Vaux became in 1843, an articled pupil of Cottingham, who was one of the elders of the English Gothic Revival, had supervised the sometimes overzealous restoration of a number of important medieval churches. Cottingham planned new streets and designed many urban dwellings in the Waterloo Bridge Road area on the Surrey side of London (where he built his own house); erected banks (the one in Bury St. Edmund's of 1844-1846 was most admired), hotels, and other commercial buildings; and published a book on Greek and Roman architecture.

He also supervised repairs at Hereford Cathedral, St Albans Abbey, and the Church of St James at Louth.

== Works and restorations ==
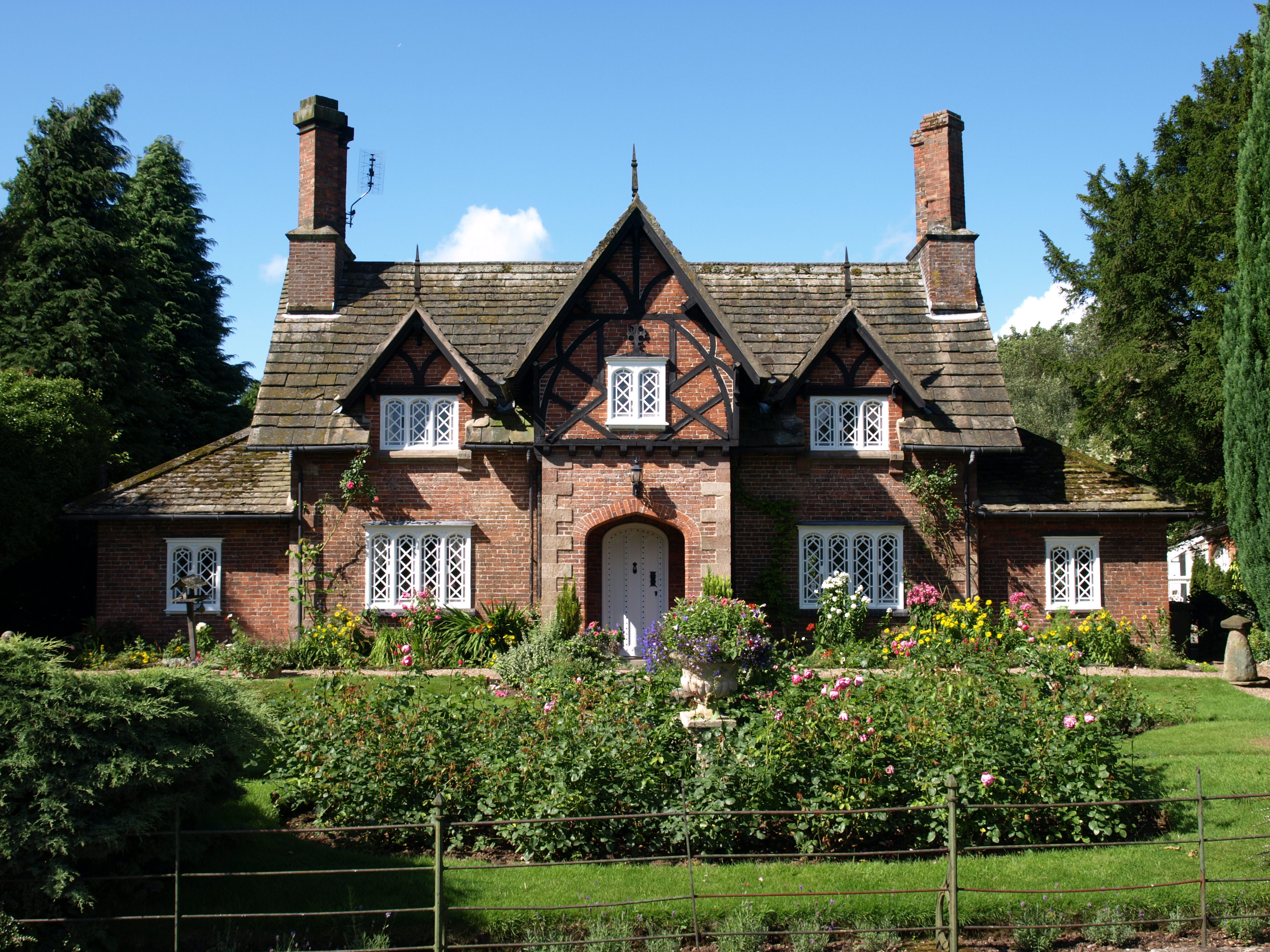
Bailiff's Cottage, Snelston

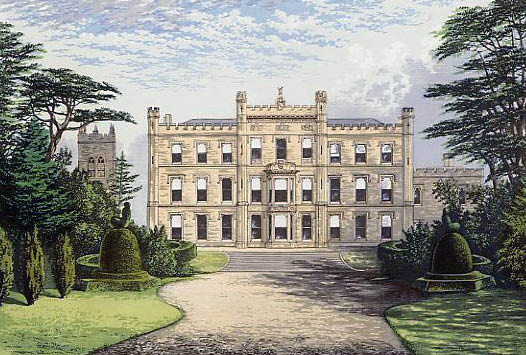
Elvaston Castle in the late 19th century.

- 1822-30 Snelston Hall, Derbyshire (demolished 1951)
- 1822-30 Snelston domestic houses
- 1824-33 Estate at Waterloo Bridge Road, London
- 1825-30 Rochester Cathedral
- 1829-33 refitted Magdalen College Chapel, Oxford
- 1830-47 Brougham Hall, Westmorland
- 1831 Elvaston Castle, Derbyshire
- 1832-33 St Albans Abbey (now the Cathedral and Abbey Church of St Alban)
- 1833–41 St Patrick's Cathedral, Armagh
- 1836-?? Theberton, Suffolk
- 1841 St Oswald's Church, Ashbourne Derbyshire
- 1841 Parish Church Great Chesterford, Essex
- 1841 Parish Church Horningsheath, Suffolk
- 1841-47 Hereford Cathedral
- 1842 Parish Church Milton Bryan
- 1842-47 St. Mary's Church, Bury St. Edmunds
- 1843-44 St. Mary's Church, Nottingham - tower restoration
- 1843-48 The Norman Tower, Bury St Edmunds - restoration
- 1844 St. James Church, Louth, Lincolnshire - spire restoration
- 1846 St. Mary's Church, Clifton, Nottinghamshire
- 1845 - 47 St Helen's Church, Thorney, Nottinghamshire. New church.
- 1846 The former Savings Bank, Crown Street, Bury St Edmunds
- 1846 Tuddenham School, Suffolk
- 1846 Great Chesterford School, Essex
- 1846 - 47 Parish Church Theberton, Suffolk
- 1846 - 47 Parish Church Barrow, Suffolk
- 1846 - 47 Parish Church Roos, Yorkshire
- 1846 - 47 Brougham Chapel, Westmorland
- 1847 Kilpeck, Herefordshire church restoration
- 1847 Ledbury, Herefordshire church restoration

== Family ==
He married Sophia Cotton on 24 January 1821. They had 4 children.

- Nockalls Johnson Cottingham (1823–1854) who was also an architect. Nockalls Johnson was lost in the wreck of the SS Arctic on its way to New York City.
- Edwin Cotton Cottingham (1825–1876)
- Sophia Anne Cottingham (1827-1827)
- Sophia Sarah Jane Cottingham (1830–1867)

== Literature ==
- L.N.Cottingham (1787–1847): Architect of the Gothic Revival by Janet Myles ISBN 978-0-85331-678-7
