= Maria Foote =

British actress and peeress

The Right Honourable The Countess of Harrington
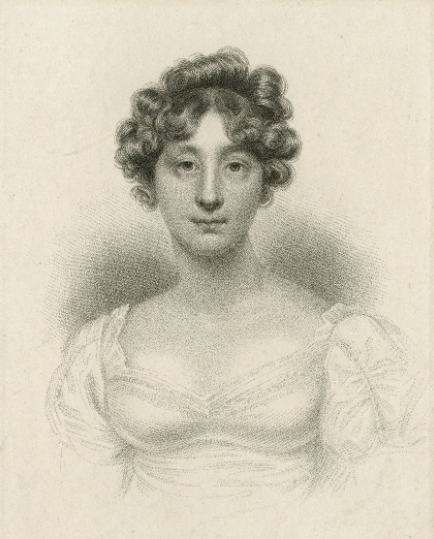
- Born: 24 July 1797; Plymouth
- Died: 27 December 1867 (aged 70); Richmond-terrace, Whitehall, London
- Occupation: Actress
- Term: 1831-1867

Maria Stanhope, Countess of Harrington (24 July 1797? - 27 December 1867), better known as Maria Foote, was a British actress and peeress in the nineteenth century.

== Early life ==
Foote was born 24 July 1797(?) at Plymouth. Her father, Samuel T. Foote (1761–1840), who claimed to be a descendant of Samuel Foote, sold out of the army, became manager of the Plymouth theatre, and married a Miss Hart. In July 1810 Miss Foote appeared as Juliet in Romeo and Juliet at her father's theatre, where she also played as Susan Ashfield in Thomas Morton's Speed the Plough, and as Emily Worthington in George Colman's Poor Gentleman.

In 1813, her father took over the Royal Clarence Hotel in Exeter. On 26 May 1814, she appeared at Covent Garden Theatre as Amanthis in the Child of Nature by Elizabeth Inchbald. In this part, which suited her, she made a great success. Her second appearance was at the same theatre in the same character in the following season, 14 September 1814. On 6 December she was the original Ulrica in The King and the Duke, or Which is Which?, attributed to Robert Francis Jameson.

== Career actress ==
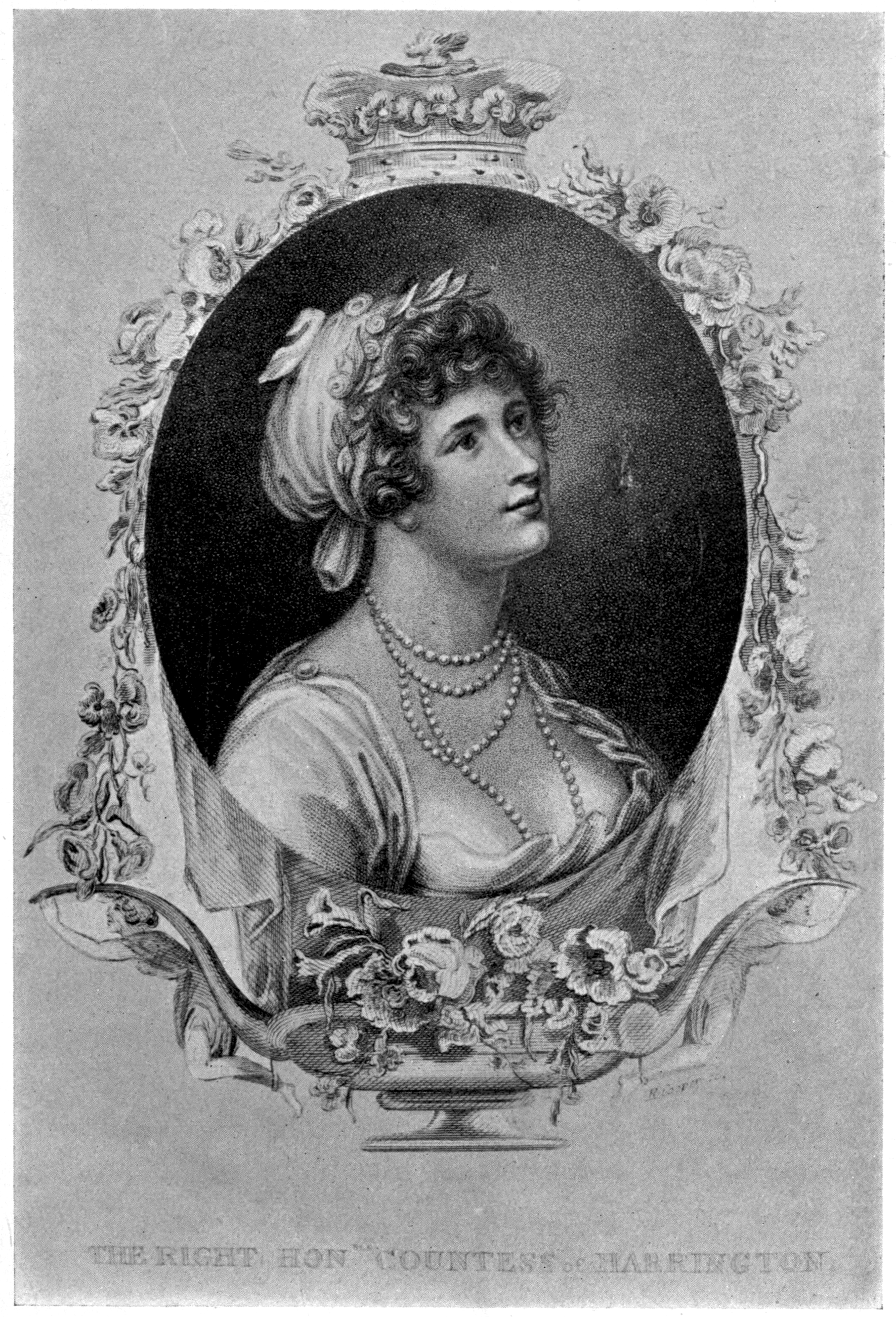
Maria Foote, afterwards Countess of Harrington; From an engraved portrait in the collection of A. M. Broadley, Esq.

On 2 January 1815 she played Miranda in The Tempest, and 17 April 1815 was the original Adela in the Fortune of War, attributed to James Kenney. For her benefit, 6 June 1815, she appeared as Statira in Alexander the Great, William Henry West Betty acting, for that occasion only, Alexander. This was her first appearance in tragedy. Fanny in The Clandestine Marriage, Hippolita in an alteration of The Tempest, Lady Percy in King Henry IV, Helena in the Midsummer Night's Dream, and many other parts, chiefly secondary, in old pieces and new, then followed.

Her abilities proved to be limited. She had, however, a reputation for beauty sufficient to secure her constant engagements at the patent theatres and in the country. She played with success in both Ireland and Scotland, and accompanied John Liston, Tyrone Power, and other actors to Paris, where they all acted with unsatisfactory results. In 1816 she formed at Cheltenham a relationship with Colonel William Berkeley, by whom she had two children. An alleged promise of marriage made by him was not kept. Joseph 'Pea Green' Hayne then proposed to her and was accepted. He retracted, however, his offer, and as the result of an action for breach of promise of marriage had to pay £3,000 damages. These proceedings gave rise to pamphlet warfare, through which and through some opposition on the stage Miss Foote retained a measure of public sympathy.

At Covent Garden she played every season up to 1824-5 inclusive, frequently in subordinate parts, but taking occasionally characters such as Miss Letitia Hardy in the Belle's Stratagem, Miss Hardcastle and, for her benefit, Lady Teazle.

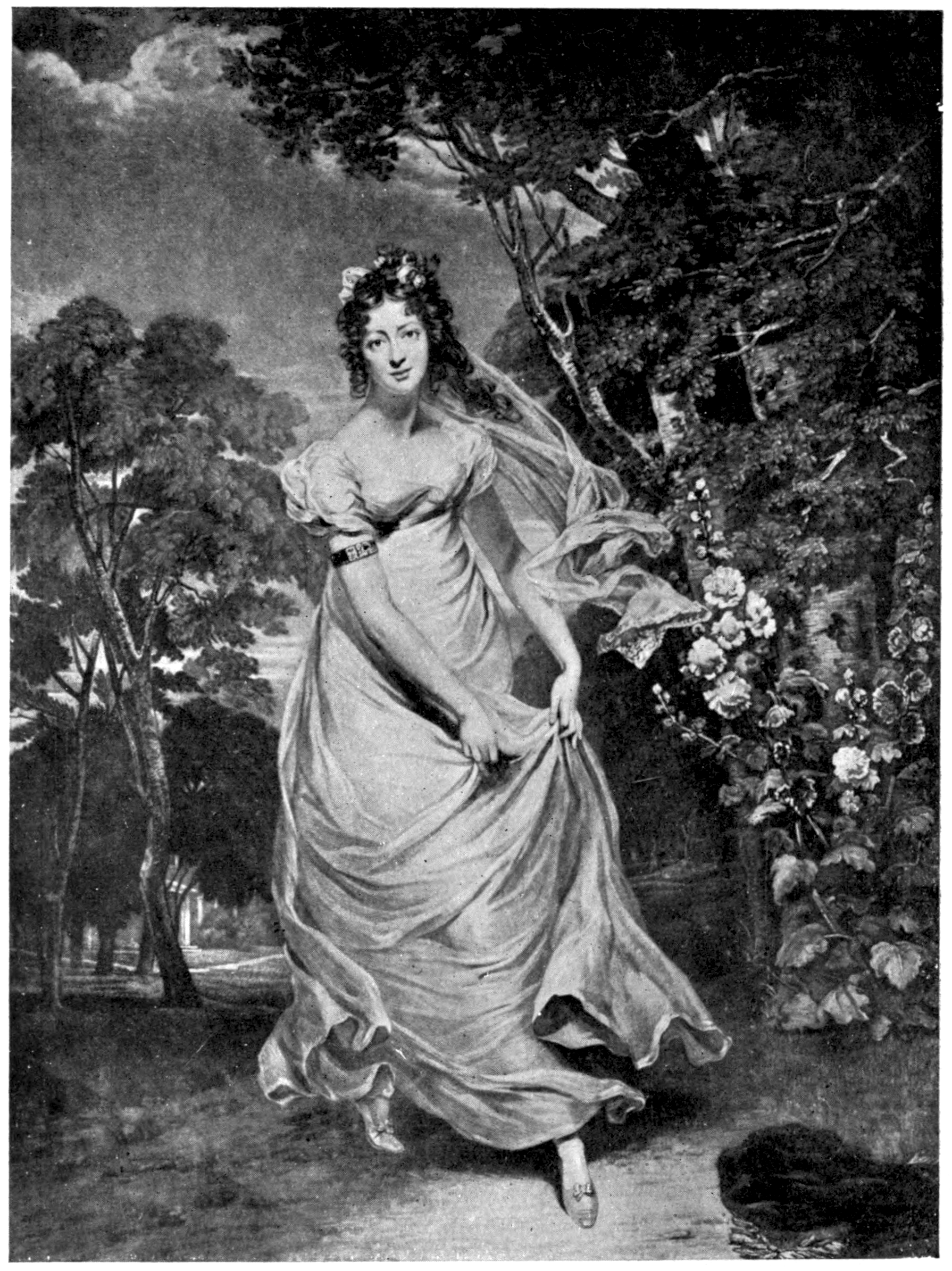
Maria Foote, afterwards Countess of Harrington, as Maria Darlington in the farce of "A Rowland for an Oliver" (1824) —frontispiece, Devonshire Characters and Strange Events, Baring-Gould, S.

She was the original Isidora in Barry Cornwall's Mirandola.

At Bath on 13 and 14 January 1826 she was the object of hostile demonstrations on the part of a portion of the audience. On 9 March 1826 she made as Letitia Hardy her first appearance at Drury Lane Theatre, where also she played Violante in The Wonder, Rosalind, Virginia, Maria in A Roland for an Oliver, Imogen, and Maggy in The Highland Reel.

Her singing and dancing and her way of accompanying herself on the harp, guitar, and pianoforte added to her popularity. She is said to have traversed England, Ireland, and Scotland every year for five years, in course of which she posted twenty-five thousand miles.

== Later life ==
Her theatrical career closed at Birmingham on 11 March 1831, and on 7 April of the same year she married Charles Stanhope, 4th Earl of Harrington. They had two children:

Charles Stanhope, Viscount Petersham (13 December 1831 – 8 April 1836) and Lady Jane St. Maur Blanche Stanhope (14 May 1833 – 28 November 1907), who married George Conyngham, 3rd Marquess Conyngham.

Maria died 27 December 1867.

== Reputation ==
She was of medium height, her face oval, and her features expressive. She had an abundance of light brown hair. By those most under her influence the character of her acting was described as fascinating.

John Genest wrote that

she was a very pretty woman and a very pleasing actress, but she never would have travelled about as a star if it had not been for circumstances totally unconnected with the stage (Account of the Stage, ix. 358-9).

A writer in the New Monthly Magazine for March 1821, variously stated to be Thomas Noon Talfourd, Thomas Campbell, and Horace Smith, wrote warmly concerning 'the pure and innocent beauty with which she has enriched our imaginations,' and, referring to her then anticipated departure, asks rhapsodically, 'Is comedy entirely to lose the most delicate and graceful of its handmaidens and tragedy the loveliest of its sufferers?' Talfourd speaks highly of the grace of her movements, and specially commends her singing of the song 'Where are you going, my pretty maid?'

A whole-length portrait by George Clint of Miss Foote as Maria Darlington was sold in June 1847, with the effects of Thomas Harris, lessee of Covent Garden.

== See also ==
- List of entertainers who married titled Britons
