= Elvaston, Derbyshire =

Village in Derbyshire, England

Coordinates: 52.890°N 1.388°W

Elvaston
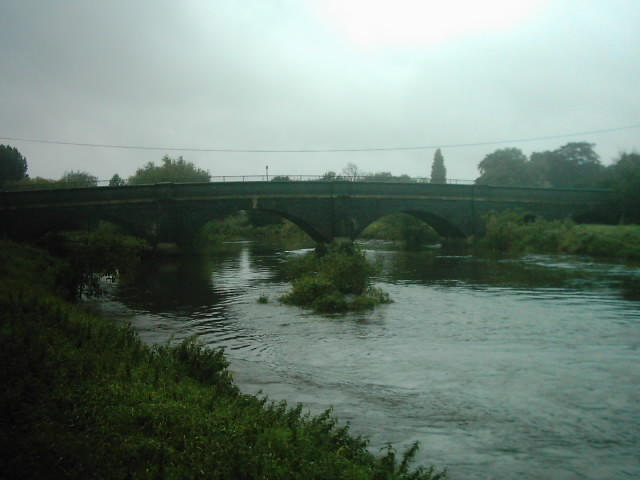
- The bridge that connects Elvaston to Borrowash

- Location within Derbyshire
- Population: 1,801 (2011)
- OS grid reference: SK412326
- District: South Derbyshire
- Shire county: Derbyshire
- Region: East Midlands
- Country: England
- Sovereign state: United Kingdom
- Post town: DERBY
- Postcode district: DE72
- Police: Derbyshire
- Fire: Derbyshire
- Ambulance: East Midlands
- UK Parliament: South Derbyshire

Elvaston is a small village and civil parish in Derbyshire, England. The parish also includes two hamlets, Ambaston and Thulston, and a modern housing estate, Boulton Moor. The population of the civil parish taken at the 2011 Census was 1,801.

Located to the south-east of Derby, Elvaston itself is dominated by Elvaston Castle, a country house which is currently in the ownership of Derbyshire County Council, who plan to lease the site to a private company. The move has proved controversial, attracting a petition of 60,000 signatures against the proposals collected by the Elvaston Castle Estate Trust, who want to keep the site in public ownership. At the present time the Castle is rarely open to the public and has been somewhat neglected, while the grounds are open throughout the summer.

St Bartholomew's Church, Elvaston is a Grade I listed building that dates from the 13th century.

== History ==
In 1086, the Domesday Book says:

”The land of Geoffrey Alselin
In Alvaston and Ambaston Thulston and Elvaston Toki had ten carucates of land to the geld. There Geoffrey Alselin has now two ploughs in demesne; and a certain knight of his one plough. There 32 villans have 15 ploughs. There is one priest and a church and a mill rendering 12 shillings and one smith and 52 acres (210,000 m^{2}) of meadow and a little scrubland. TRE worth twelve pounds now ten pounds. “

== Notable residents ==
- Anthony Blackwall was a vicar here
- William Stanhope, 1st Earl of Harrington 1683–1756
- John Buller (1823–1967), was born here
- Geoffrey S. Dawes, physiologist lived in Thurleston Grange as a boy
- William Darwin Fox, introduced his second cousin Charles Darwin to the study of insects, was born near here in 1805

== Ambaston ==
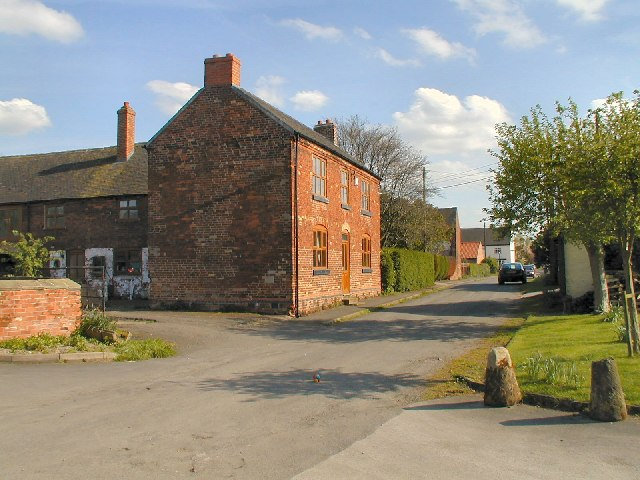
A farmhouse at Ambaston

The hamlet of Ambaston is located about one mile east of Elvaston close to the River Derwent.

== Thulston ==
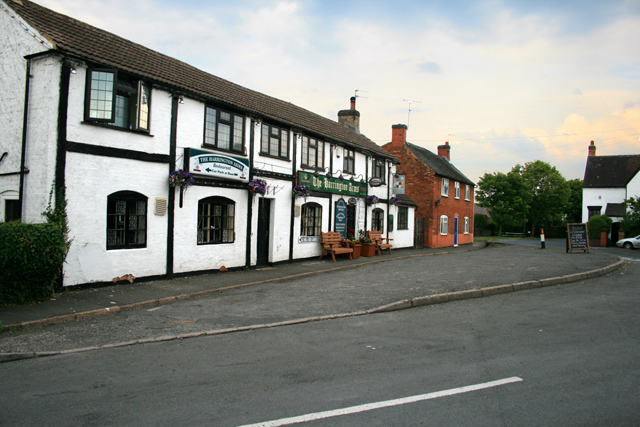
The Harrington Arms public house, Thulston

The hamlet of Thulston is immediately south of Elvaston on the B5010 road. The Harrington Arms is the only public house in the parish and is a local landmark in Thulston.

== See also ==
- Listed buildings in Elvaston, Derbyshire
