= Henrietta Grosvenor =

English aristocrat (c. 1745-1828)

The Right Honourable The Lady de Hochepied
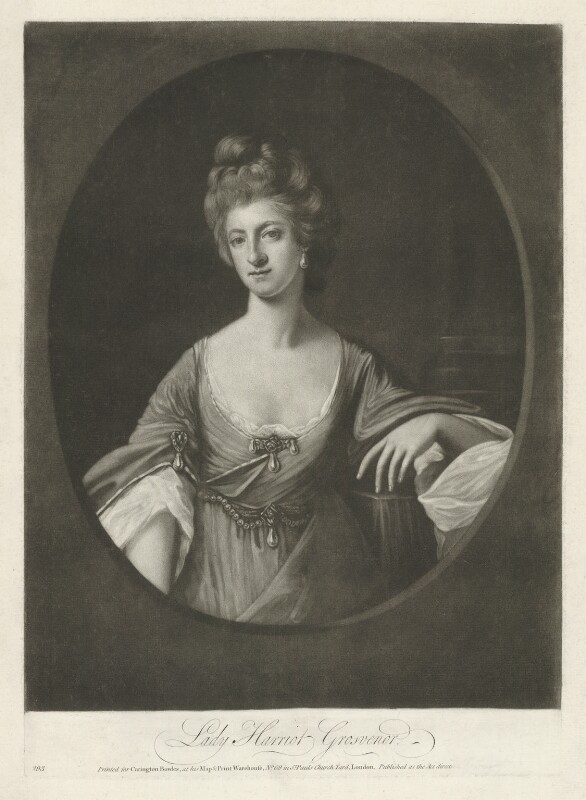
- Born: Henrietta Vernon c. 1745
- Died: 1828 (aged 82–83); Ealing, West London, England
- Other name: The Lady Grosvenor
- Spouses: Richard Grosvenor, 1st Earl Grosvenor (m. 1764; died 1802) George Porter (m. 1802)
- Children: 4, including Robert Grosvenor, 1st Marquess of Westminster
- Parent(s): Henry Vernon; Lady Henrietta Wentworth
- Relatives: Thomas Wentworth, 1st Earl of Strafford (grandfather)

Henrietta de Hochepied, Baroness de Hochepied (née Vernon; formerly Baroness Grosvenor, c. 1745 – 1828) was an English aristocrat, socialite, and courtesan.

== Early life ==
She was one of four daughters born to Lady Henrietta (née Wentworth) Vernon (third daughter of Thomas Wentworth, 1st Earl of Strafford) and Henry Vernon of Hilton Hall, former Member of Parliament for Lichfield and Newcastle-under-Lyme.

== New Female Coterie ==
After her separation from the Baron Grosvenor (who was made Earl Grosvenor in 1784), Henrietta lived in Paris and London in the subsequent years, with the emotional and financial support of several men, and the press continued to report on her lovers and her appearances at social occasions for decades. She was a member of the social club for the 'demi-reps' nicknamed the New Female Coterie by the English press, whose members comprised fellow elite women publicly shamed for infidelity such as Caroline Stanhope, Countess of Harrington and Seymour Fleming. Janine Barchas suggests that the legacy of the scandals attached to Henrietta Vernon may have inspired Jane Austen in writing her early epistolary novel Lady Susan, which centres on the charming and flirtatious Lady Susan Vernon.

== Personal life ==
On 19 July 1764, she married Richard Grosvenor, 1st Baron Grosvenor, later Earl Grosvenor (1731–1802) at St George's Church, Hanover Square. They had four sons, including:

- Robert Grosvenor (1767–1845), who married Eleanor Egerton, the only child of Thomas Egerton, 1st Earl of Wilton, in 1794.

In 1769, Lady Grosvenor was discovered in flagrante delicto with the Duke of Cumberland, brother of King George III. Their affair became a national scandal when her husband sued the duke on the grounds of 'criminal conversation' with his wife, and the lovers' correspondence was published in the press as part of the trial reports. The jury awarded the baronet damages of £10,000 in recognition of the damage to his marital property.

Lady Grosvenor prevented the baron from securing a divorce on the grounds of her adultery by gathering evidence of his own extensive sexual misconduct, personally 'going into bawdy houses [...] to search and procure witnesses'. The diarist and artist Joseph Farington dubbed Lord Grosvenor as 'one of the most profligate men of his age, in what relates to women'. This wealth of evidence meant that the baron could not be granted an annulment, and was obliged to support his wife for the rest of his life. The couple's legal separation in 1771 included yearly maintenance payments of £1200 to Lady Grosvenor.

=== Second marriage ===
On 1 September 1802 Lady Grosvenor married her longtime companion, the Whig MP George Porter, the son of the British diplomat Sir James Porter. George later inherited the Hungarian title of Baron de Hochepied through his mother's line, making Henrietta the Baroness de Hochepied. She died in 1828 in Ealing.
