= Richard Grosvenor, 1st Earl Grosvenor =

English landowner, politician and peer (1731–1802)

The Right Honourable The Earl Grosvenor
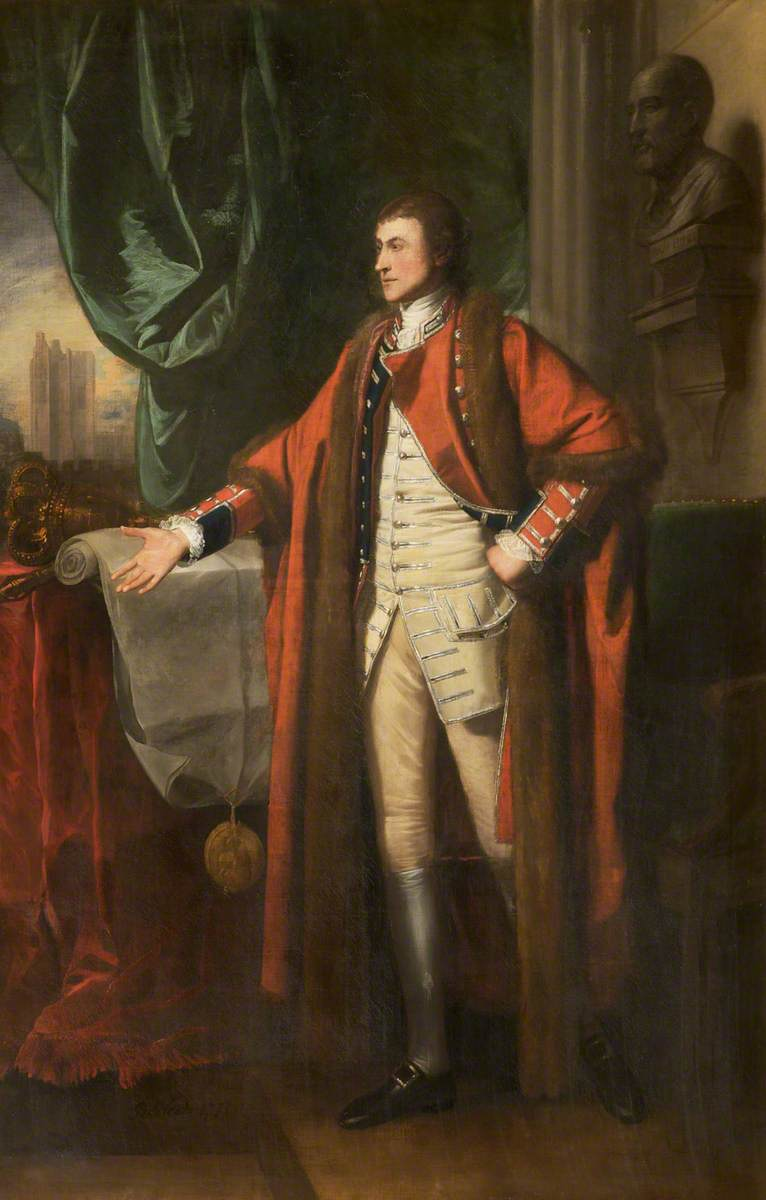

Personal details
- Born: 18 June 1731 Eaton Hall, Cheshire, England
- Died: 5 August 1802 (aged 71)
- Resting place: St Mary's Church, Eccleston, Cheshire, England
- Party: Tory
- Spouse: Henrietta Vernon
- Children: 4, including Robert
- Parent(s): Sir Robert Grosvenor, 6th Baronet (father); Jane Warre (mother)

Richard Grosvenor, 1st Earl Grosvenor (/ˈɡroʊvənər/ GROH-vən-ər; 18 June 1731 – 5 August 1802) was an English landowner, Tory politician and peer who sat in the British House of Commons representing the parliamentary constituency of the City of Chester from 1754 to 1761.

== Early life ==
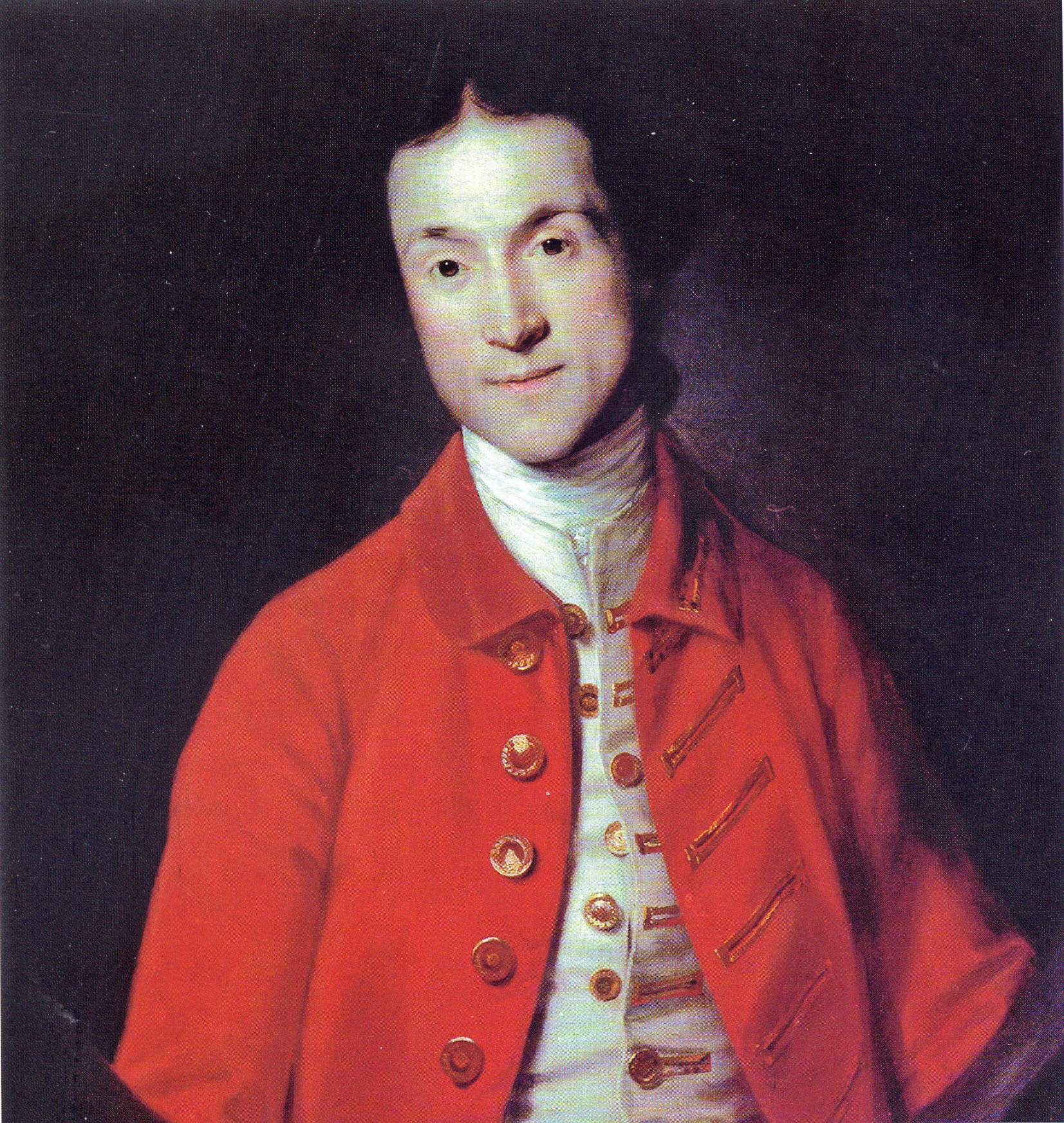
A portrait of Grosvenor attributed to Sir Joshua Reynolds

Richard Grosvenor was born at Eaton Hall, Cheshire, the elder son of Sir Robert Grosvenor, 6th Baronet and Jane Warre. He was educated at Oriel College, Oxford, graduating MA in 1751 and DCL in 1754.

== Political career ==
He became Member of Parliament for Chester in 1754 and continued to represent the city until 1761, when he became Baron Grosvenor and was elevated to the House of Lords. He was mayor of Chester in 1759 and in 1769 he paid for the building of the Eastgate in the city. Grosvenor extended his estate by the purchase of the village of Belgrave, and the manor of Eccleston in 1769. He succeeded as 7th baronet on the death of his father in 1755.

Initially, Grosvenor was, like his father, a Tory, but later he came to support the ideas of William Pitt the Elder. In 1758 he declared himself in favour of the Pitt–Newcastle ministry and following this he was created Baron Grosvenor in 1761. However, when the Tory Earl of Bute became Prime Minister the following year, Grosvenor changed his allegiance. Then, when Pitt was returned to power in the Chatham Ministry of 1766–1768, Grosvenor returned to support him. During the 1770s he supported Lord North during the American War of Independence. He voted against Fox's India Bill in 1783 and was rewarded by William Pitt the Younger with title of Earl Grosvenor the following year.

== Personal life ==
Grosvenor was interested in the acquisition of art, as well as Thoroughbred horse racing and horse breeding. He bred several Thoroughbred racehorses, including Medley (1776 – 1792), whom Grosvenor subsequently sold to Sir John Lade; he also purchased the racehorses and stallions Gimcrack in 1771, and Potoooooooo ("Pot-8-Os") in 1778, the latter at the 1200 Guineas Stakes. Grosvenor also owned the racehorses Mambrino (born 1768), Protector (born 1770), Sweet William (born 1768), and Sweetbriar (born 1769), as well as bred Rhadamanthus (born 1787), who was sold to William Frisby by 1795; Daedalus (born 1791), whom Grosvenor sold to a "Mr. A. Bayton" at the end of 1794; et al.

He was also the principal patron of the satirist and journalist William Gifford. For his art collection he acquired works from Italy, and also bought paintings from Benjamin West (including his painting of The Death of General Wolfe), Thomas Gainsborough, Richard Wilson and George Stubbs. In 1788 a collection of literary pieces composed at Eaton was published as The Eaton Chronicle, or The Salt-Box. Grosvenor was appointed as a Fellow of the Royal Society in 1777. To breed his race horses Grosvenor established studs at Wallasey and at Eaton. His horses won the Derby on three occasions and the Oaks six times. His racing silks were yellow, with a black cap.

In the 1760s, Grosvenor occupied Aubrey House, in the Campden Hill area of Holland Park. A London County Council blue plaque commemorates Grosvenor and other residents of the house.

== Family and death ==
On 19 July 1764 Grosvenor married Henrietta Vernon, daughter of Henry Vernon of Hilton Park, Staffordshire; they had four sons. However, the marriage was not happy, and Henrietta had an affair with Henry, Duke of Cumberland, the younger brother of George III. The couple were discovered in flagrante delicto in 1769, which led to Grosvenor bringing an action against the Duke for "criminal conversation" (that is, adultery). He was awarded damages of £10,000, which together with costs, amounted to an award of £13,000 (£1,480,000 in 2015). But Grosvenor was also known to be guilty of adultery himself, regularly seeking out prostitutes around Leicester Square, so he could not sue for divorce. The couple separated and he settled an annual allowance of £1,200 (£140,000 in 2015) on his estranged wife, who entered the demi-monde and was a leading member of The New Female Coterie.

Grosvenor died at Earls Court in 1802 and was buried in the family vault at St Mary's Church, Eccleston. His assets amounted to "under £70,000" (£4,270,000 in 2015), but his debts were "over £100,000" (£6,100,000 in 2015). In 1799 he (or his immediate family benefit trust) was estimated the wealthiest small family unit in Britain by a margin of 49%, owning £6.25M (equivalent to £617,200,000 in 2025). He was succeeded at Eaton Hall by his eldest son Robert.

== Horses ==
Thoroughbred racehorses bred or owned by Lord Grosvenor include:

- Gimcrack (born 1760), sold to Lord Grosvenor by Sir Charles Bunbury, 6th Baronet in 1769 at the age of 9.
- Mambrino (born 1768), sold to Lord Grosvenor in 1775 at the age of 7.
- Sweet William (born 1768), sold to Lord Grosvenor in 1772 at age 4, and painted by George Stubbs in 1779.
- Sweetbriar (born 1769), bred by either Thomas Meredith or Lord Grosvenor, and also painted by George Stubbs.
- Protector (born 1770), bred by Frederick St John, 2nd Viscount Bolingbroke; sold by Sir Charles Bunbury, 6th Baronet to Lord Grosvenor.
- Potoooooooo ("Pot-8-Os") (born 1773), sold to Lord Grosvenor in 1778 at the age of 5 for 1,500 guineas.
- Medley (born 1776), bred by Lord Grosvenor, and subsequently sold to Sir John Lade. Exported to Virginia.
- Messenger (born 1780), bred by Lord Grosvenor, per some sources, and sired by Mambrino. Exported to Pennsylvania.
- Alexander (born 1782), a son of Eclipse owned by Lord Grosvenor. Famous broodmare and dam sire.
- Meteor (born 1783), bred by Lord Grosvenor. A son of Eclipse named for the 1783 Great Meteor.
- Rhadamanthus (born 1787), bred by Lord Grosvenor, and sold to William Frisby by 1795.
- John Bull (born 1789), bred and owned by Lord Grosvenor. Sired over 35 foals at Grosvenor's stud farm.
- Daedalus (born 1791), bred by Lord Grosvenor, and sold to a "Mr. A. Bayton" at the end of 1794, after an unsuccessful career.

Parliament of Great Britain
Preceded by Sir Robert Grosvenor; Philip Henry Warburton	Member of Parliament for the City of Chester; 1754–1761; With: Sir Robert Grosvenor 1754–1755; Thomas Grosvenor 1755–1761	Succeeded by Thomas Grosvenor; Richard Wilbraham-Bootle
Peerage of Great Britain
New creation	Earl Grosvenor; 1784–1802	Succeeded by Robert Grosvenor
New creation	Baron Grosvenor; 1761–1802	Succeeded by Robert Grosvenor
Baronetage of England
Preceded by Robert Grosvenor	Baronet (of Eaton); 1755–1802	Succeeded by Robert Grosvenor
