= The New Female Coterie =

Eighteenth-century London ladies' social club

The New Female Coterie was an 18th-century London social club.

The club's exact founding date is unknown, though it is assumed to be circa 1770, when Caroline Stanhope, Countess of Harrington was blackballed from joining the Female Coterie, a club for aristocrats.

The New Female Coterie became a social outlet for "demi-reps," a word Henry Fielding coined in 1749 in his novel Tom Jones to refer to a woman ‘who intrigues with every Man she likes, under the Name and Appearance of Virtue.’ The members came to include high-status women who had been publicly shamed for promiscuity or adultery, such as Henrietta Grosvenor, Seymour Dorothy Fleming, Penelope Ligonier, Lady Margaret Adams, Lady Derby, Lady Ann Cork, and the Honorable Catherine Newton. Meetings took place at the exclusive brothel on King's Place run by Sarah Pendergast, a friend of the Stanhopes, and included supper and gambling as well as a forum for discussion, an outlet for disgraced women who would otherwise have been ostracised from their 'respectable' female family and friends.

The journalist Thomas Robertson attended several of their meetings, and reported on them in the Rambler's Magazine. He wrote that the topics under discussion at these meetings included the moral and philosophical implications of sexual relationships as well as their pleasures, ranging from inequality of men and women within marriage, to the ethical nuances of adultery. In another of his articles, the members were satirised under aliases for their lascivious discussions.
