= Portrait of Lady Worsley =

Painting by Joshua Reynolds

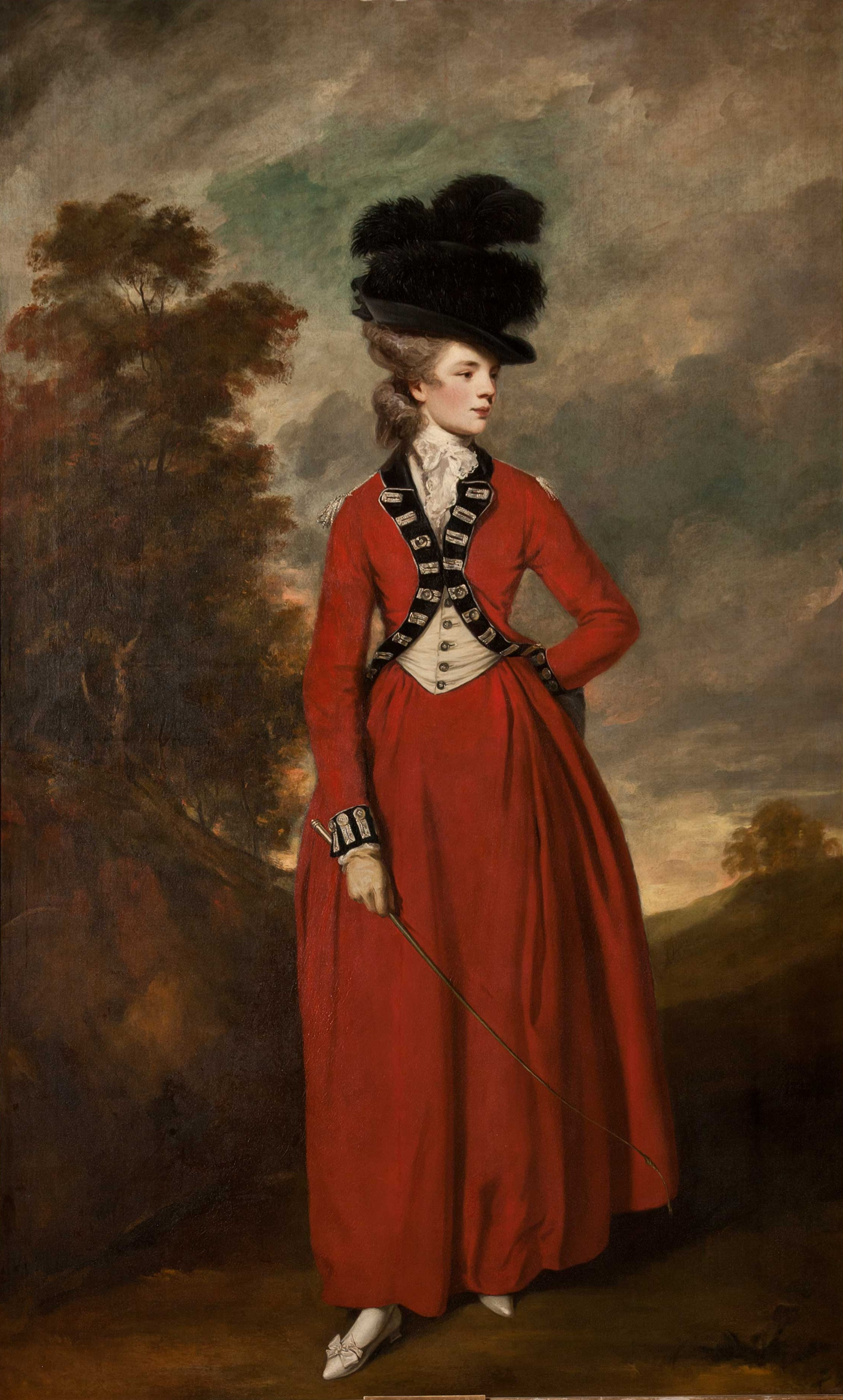
- Artist: Joshua Reynolds
- Year: 1779
- Type: Oil on canvas, portrait painting
- Dimensions: 236 cm × 144 cm (93 in × 57 in)
- Location: Harewood House, West Yorkshire

Portrait of Lady Worsley is a 1779 portrait painting by the British artist Joshua Reynolds depicting Seymour, Lady Worsley. Worsley was the wife of Sir Richard Worsley, 7th Baronet, who she had married in 1775. She is shown in a riding habit customised to resemble the uniform of the South Hampshire Militia of which her husband was colonel. At the time there was a patriotic outburst following the entry of France and Spain into the American War of Independence. In the year of the painting, a Franco-Spanish fleet threatened an invasion of England known as the Armada of 1779. Reynolds spotted Lady Worsley wearing her riding costume at Coxheath military camp near Maidstone in Kent. The painting was intended to complement a 1775 portrait of Sir Richard wearing his uniform. She later became involved in a notorious scandal in 1782 when she ran off with her lover, who was sued by her husband for criminal conversation.

In the painting she holds a riding crop in her right hand, an allusion to her skill at horsemanship. Reynolds was the first President of the Royal Academy and he displayed the work at the Royal Academy Exhibition of 1780 at Somerset House. The painting was last purchased by American businessman Stephen Schwarzman from the collection of Harewood House in Yorkshire for £25 million.

== Controversy Over Sale ==
As a result of the sale, Marcia Pointon, Professor Emerita in History of Art, University of Manchester, UK, wrote to the Financial Times Newspaper on January 31, 2025, which was published under the title 'Reynolds sale should irk Britain’s art-loving public.'

In the article Pointon condemned the painting's sale and demanded assurances that the painting would not be exported.

== Bibliography ==
- Cruickshank, Dan. The Secret History of Georgian London: How the Wages of Sin Shaped the Capital. Random House, 2010.
- Esposito, Donato. Sir Joshua Reynolds: The Acquisition of Genius. Sansom, 2009.
- McCreery, Cindy. The Satirical Gaze: Prints of Women in Late Eighteenth-century England. Clarendon Press, 2004.
- Rubenhold, Hallie. Lady Worsley's Whim: An Eighteenth-Century Tale of Sex, Scandal and Divorce. Random House, 2011.
- Gapper, John (24 January 2025). "Blackstone's Schwarzman stirs London art market with record purchases". Financial Times.
