= Prince Henry, Duke of Cumberland and Strathearn =

British prince (1745–1790)

Prince Henry
- Duke of Cumberland and Strathearn
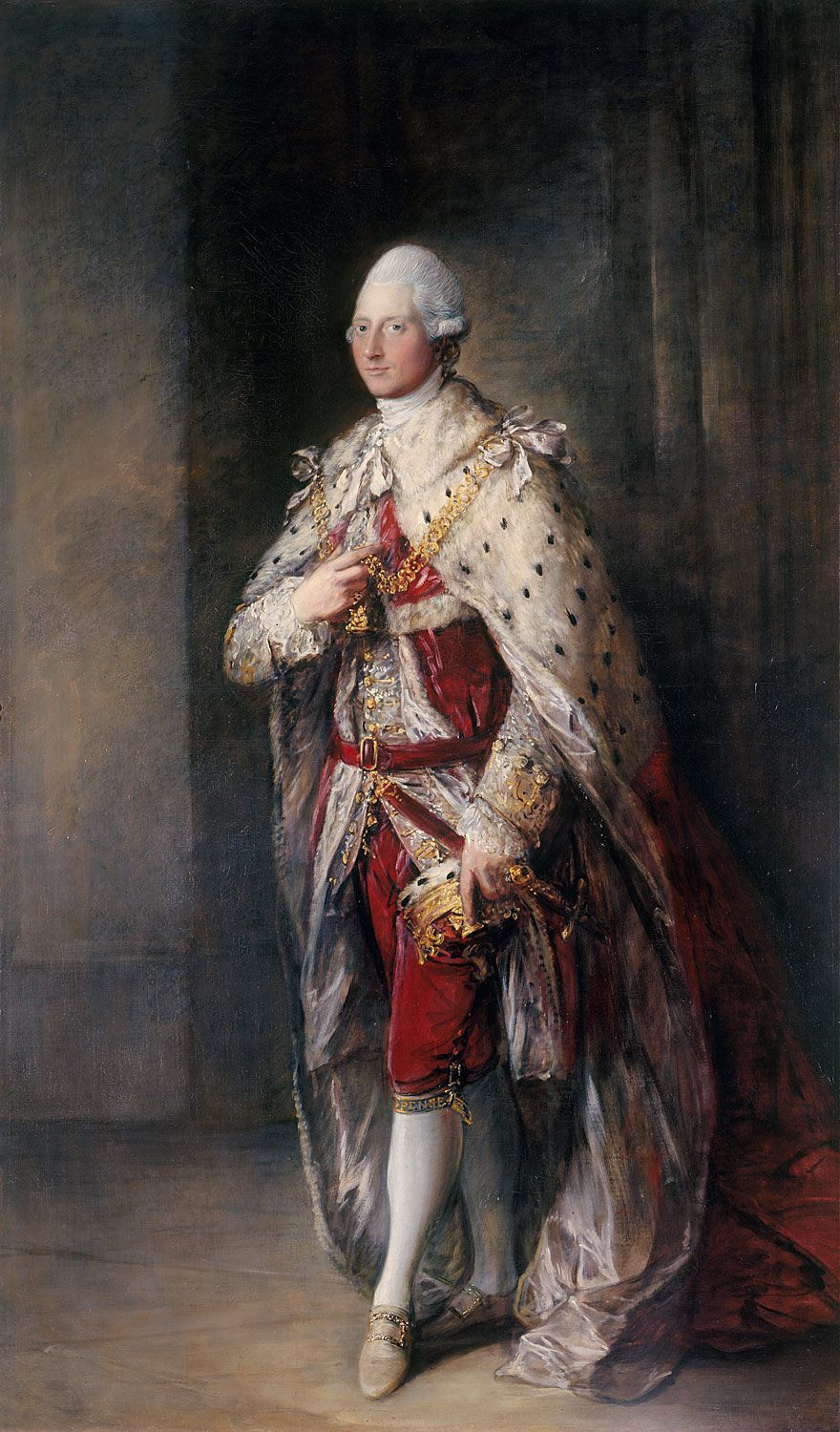
- Portrait by Thomas Gainsborough, 1777
- Born: 27 October 1745; Leicester House, London
- Died: 18 September 1790 (aged 44); Cumberland House, London
- Burial: 28 September 1790; Westminster Abbey
- Spouse: Anne Horton (m. 1771)
Names
- Henry Frederick
- House: Hanover
- Father: Frederick, Prince of Wales
- Mother: Princess Augusta of Saxe-Gotha
- Military career
- Allegiance: Great Britain
- Branch: Royal Navy
- Service years: 1768–1790
- Rank: Admiral of the White

Prince Henry, Duke of Cumberland and Strathearn (Henry Frederick; 7 November [O.S. 27 October] 1745 – 18 September 1790) was the sixth child and fourth son of Frederick, Prince of Wales, and Princess Augusta of Saxe-Gotha, and a younger brother of George III. His 1771 marriage to a commoner against the King's wishes prompted the Royal Marriages Act 1772.

== Early life ==
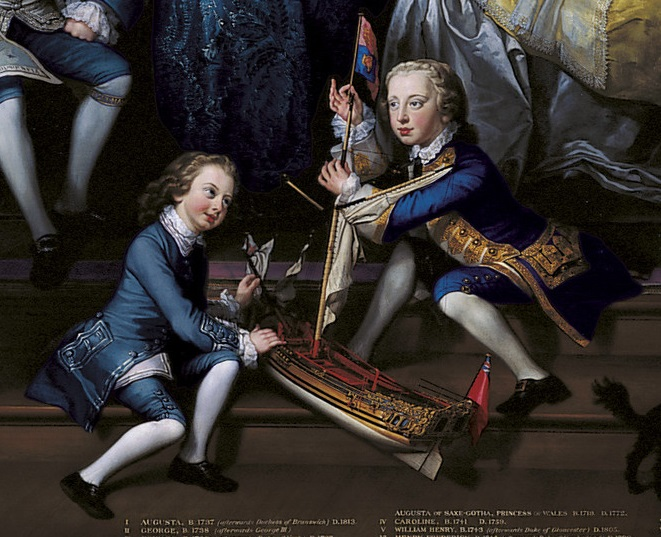
Henry (right) with his brother William Henry, from a family group portrait of 1751.

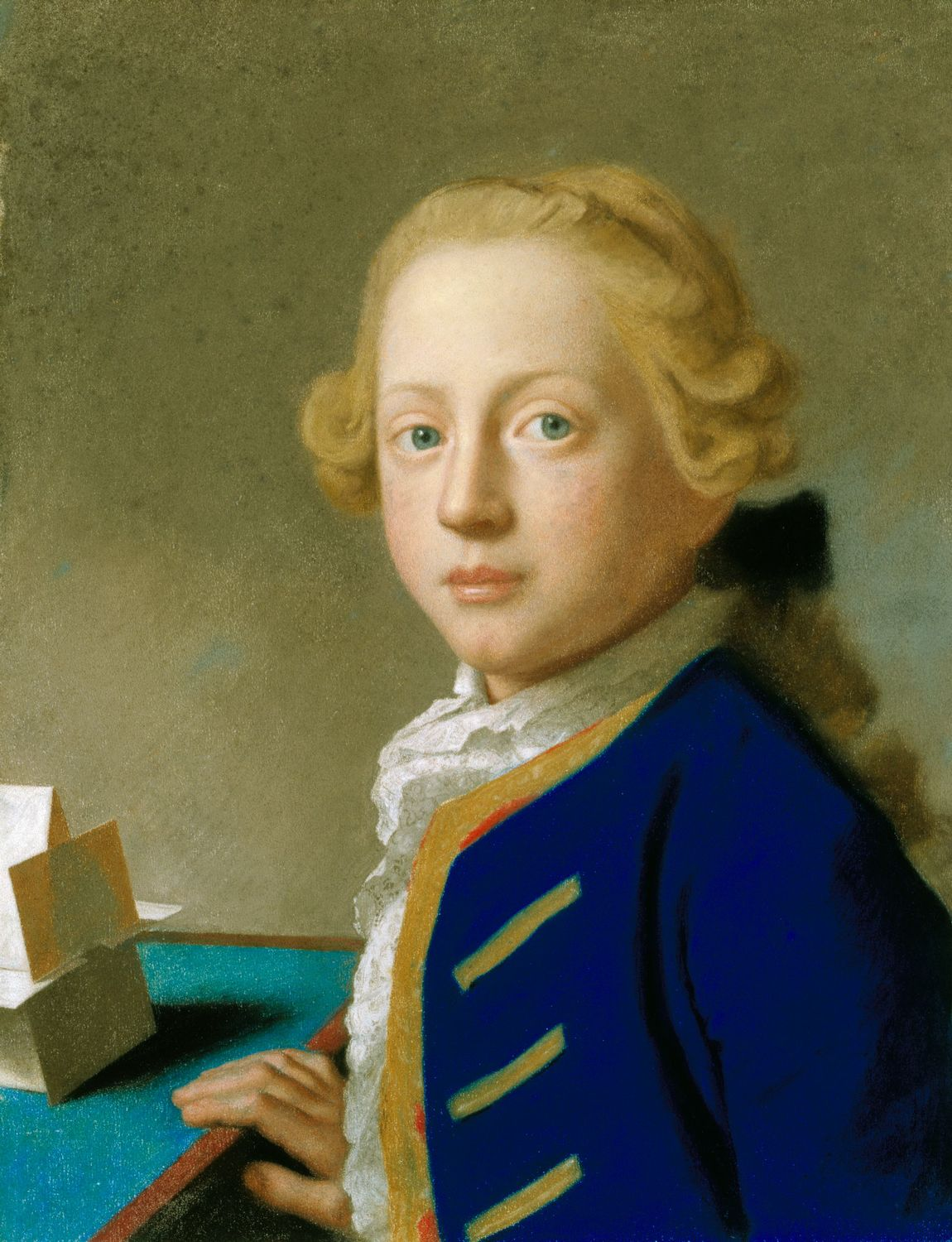
Prince Henry, aged 9, by Liotard

Henry was born on 27 October 1745 at Leicester House, London, to Frederick, Prince of Wales, son of George II and Caroline of Ansbach, and his wife Augusta, the Princess of Wales.

== Royal Dukedom ==
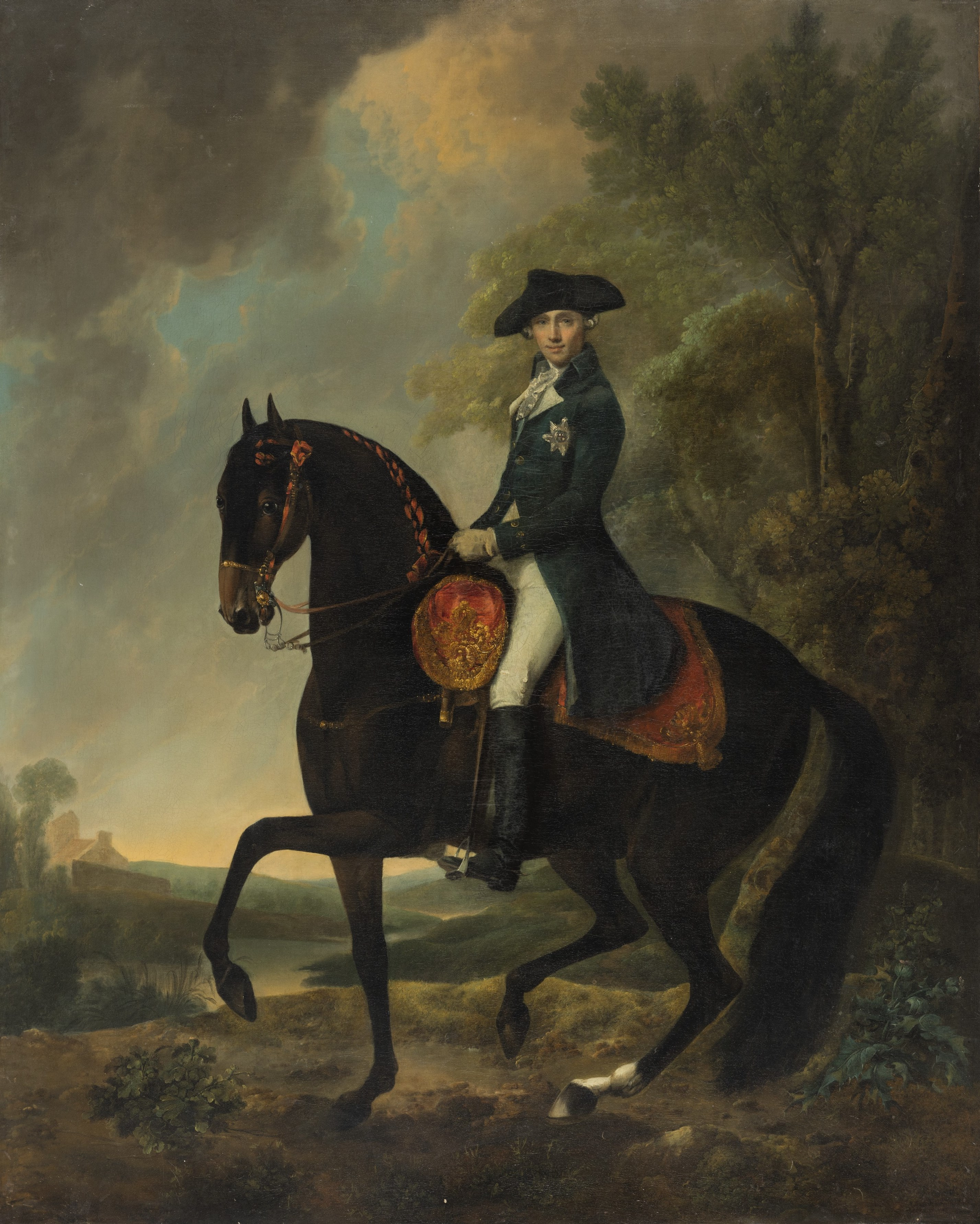
Equestrian portrait by David Morier around 1765

On 22 October 1766, just prior to his twenty-first birthday, Henry was created Duke of Cumberland and Strathearn and Earl of Dublin. He was Ranger of Windsor Forest and Great Park, from 1766 to 1790. He became a Privy Councillor in 1766 and was appointed Knight of the Garter the following year (1767).

== Allegations ==
On 4 March 1767, the Duke of Cumberland allegedly married Olive Wilmot (later Mrs Payne), a commoner, in a secret ceremony. There reportedly was one child, Olivia Wilmot (1772–1834), from this relationship, though the duke's paternity was never proven, and a jury found unanimously that Olivia Wilmot had forged the evidence. A landscape painter and novelist, Olivia Wilmot married John Thomas Serres (1759–1825) and later, controversially, assumed the title of "Princess Olivia of Cumberland".

Cumberland's mistresses included Ann Elliot who had been an actress before another had taken her off the stage. Cumberland set her up in a house in Greek Street in Soho where she died after an illness in 1769. Cumberland arranged for her burial and memorial and gave a large sum to her estate.

In 1769, the Duke of Cumberland was sued by Lord Grosvenor for "criminal conversation" (that is, adultery) after the Duke and Lady Grosvenor were discovered in flagrante delicto. Lord Grosvenor was awarded damages of £10,000, which together with costs amounted to an award of £13,000 (equivalent to £2,050,000 in 2025).

== Royal Navy ==
In 1768, at the fairly late age of 22, the Duke entered the Royal Navy as a midshipman and was sent to Corsica in HMS Venus. However, he returned in September when the ship was recalled following the French invasion of the Corsican Republic. He was promoted to Rear-Admiral the following year and Vice-Admiral in 1770.

== Marriage ==
On 2 October 1771, the Duke married Anne Horton (1743–1808), daughter of Irish peer and British MP Simon Luttrell, 1st Earl of Carhampton (then Lord Irnham), and the widow of Christopher Horton of Catton Hall. The marriage caused a rift with the King, who considered it a mismatch, and was the catalyst for the Royal Marriages Act 1772, which forbade any descendant of George II to marry without the monarch's permission.

The marriage between Anne Horton and the Duke of Cumberland was described as a "conquest at Brighthelmstone" (now Brighton) by Mrs. Horton, "who", Horace Walpole says, "had for many months been dallying with his passion, till she had fixed him to more serious views than he had intended". Anne was however generally thought one of the great beauties of the age (even Walpole found her green eyes "enchanting"), and Thomas Gainsborough painted her several times.

== Later life and death ==
In 1775, the Duke established the Cumberland Fleet, which would later become the Royal Thames Yacht Club. He was promoted vice-admiral of the White in 1776, admiral of the Blue in 1778, and admiral of the White in 1782, though he was forbidden from assuming any command. The Duke was also instrumental in the development of Brighton as a popular resort. He had first visited in 1771, and in 1783, the Prince of Wales visited his uncle there.

The Duke of Cumberland died in London on 18 September 1790, aged 44. His widow died in 1808.

== Titles, styles, honours and arms ==
=== Titles ===
- 27 October 1745 – 22 October 1766: His Royal Highness Prince Henry
- 22 October 1766 – 18 September 1790: His Royal Highness The Duke of Cumberland and Strathearn

The prince's full style, as recited by Garter King of Arms at his funeral, was the "Most High, Most Mighty and Illustrious Prince Henry Frederick, Duke of Cumberland and Strathearn, Earl of Dublin, Knight of the Most Noble Order of the Garter".

=== Arms ===
Henry was granted use of the arms of the kingdom, differenced by a label argent of five points, the centre bearing a cross gules, the other points each bearing a fleur-de-lys azure.

== Ancestors ==
Ancestors of Prince Henry, Duke of Cumberland and Strathearn

8. George I of Great Britain
4. George II of Great Britain
9. Duchess Sophia Dorothea of Brunswick-Celle
2. Frederick, Prince of Wales
10. John Frederick, Margrave of Brandenburg-Ansbach
5. Princess Caroline of Brandenburg-Ansbach
11. Princess Eleonore Erdmuthe of Saxe-Eisenach
1. Prince Henry, Duke of Cumberland and Strathearn
12. Frederick I, Duke of Saxe-Gotha-Altenburg
6. Frederick II, Duke of Saxe-Gotha-Altenburg
13. Princess Magdalena Sibylle of Saxe-Weissenfels
3. Princess Augusta of Saxe-Gotha
14. Charles, Prince of Anhalt-Zerbst
7. Princess Magdalena Augusta of Anhalt-Zerbst
15. Princess Sophia of Saxe-Weissenfels

== Citations ==
Prince Henry, Duke of Cumberland and Strathearn House of Hanover Cadet branch of the House of Welf Born: 7 November 1745 Died: 18 September 1790
Masonic offices
Preceded by The Duke of Manchester	Grand Master of the Premier Grand Lodge of England; 1782–1790	Succeeded by The Earl of Moira (as Acting Grand Master)
