= Caroline Stanhope, Countess of Harrington =

18th-century British demimonde

Caroline Stanhope
- Countess of Harrington
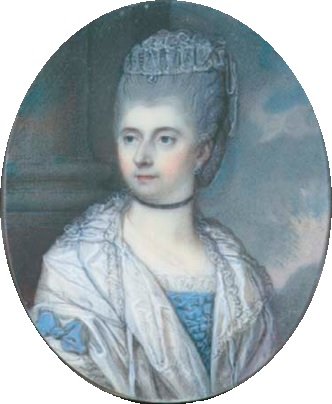
- Portrait of Lady Caroline FitzRoy by Richard Cosway
- Born: Caroline FitzRoy; 8 April 1722
- Died: 26 June 1784 (aged 62)
- Noble family: FitzRoy (by birth); Stanhope (by marriage)
- Spouse: William Stanhope, 2nd Earl of Harrington (m. 1746; died 1779)
- Issue: Isabella Molyneux, Countess of Sefton; Charles Stanhope, 3rd Earl of Harrington
- Father: Charles FitzRoy, 2nd Duke of Grafton
- Mother: Lady Henrietta Somerset
- Occupation: Socialite, demimondaine

Caroline Stanhope, Countess of Harrington (née FitzRoy; 8 April 1722 – 26 June 1784) was a British socialite and demimondaine. Through her father, she was a great-granddaughter of Charles II. After being blackballed by the English social group The Female Coterie, she founded The New Female Coterie, a social club of courtesans and "fallen women" that met in a brothel. Known for her infidelity and bisexuality, she was nicknamed the "Stable Yard Messalina" due to her adulterous lifestyle. Her "colourful" life is often contrasted with that of her daughter-in-law, Jane Stanhope, Countess of Harrington, who was viewed as a respectable member of British high society.

== Family ==
Lady Caroline was born on 8 April 1722, the fifth child of Charles FitzRoy, 2nd Duke of Grafton and Lady Henrietta Somerset, the daughter of Charles Somerset, Marquess of Worcester.

Lady Caroline married William Stanhope, 2nd Earl of Harrington on 11 August 1746. Together they had seven children, including Isabella Molyneux, Countess of Sefton and Charles Stanhope, 3rd Earl of Harrington. Lady Caroline and her husband were both notorious for their extramarital affairs, but they chose to stay married to prevent the scandal of divorce. Lady Caroline was reportedly bisexual and had male and female lovers.

== The New Female Coterie ==
Due to her rather scandalous reputation in society, Lady Caroline was blackballed from the Female Coterie, an elite social group, affiliated with Almack's, for members of London's high society. Lady Caroline instead founded her own group, The New Female Coterie, which included other members of the British upper class who were shunned by high society due to their reputations, particularly for women who had been guilty of committing adultery. The meetings were held in a brothel owned by Sarah Prendergast. Seymour Fleming, Lady Worsley, the sister of Lady Caroline's daughter-in-law, was among the members of the new club.

Lady Caroline was nicknamed "Stable Yard Messalina" by the press. The nickname was a reference to Empress Messalina, the controversial wife of Roman Emperor Claudius, and to the Harrington home in St James's Park, located near the stable yard. Town & Country published a story accusing her of having affairs with all echelons of society "from a monarch down to a hairdresser."

== Legacy ==
Lady Caroline is a subject in the books In Bed with the Georgians: Sex, Scandal & Satire in the 18th Century by Mike Rendell, The Lady in Red: An Eighteenth-Century Tale of Sex, Scandal, and Divorce by Hallie Rubenhold, and Through the Keyhole: Sex, Scandal and the Secret Life of the Country House by Susan Law.
