= Sir Richard Worsley, 7th Baronet =

English Baronet and politician

The Right Honourable Sir Richard Worsley Bt FRS FSA
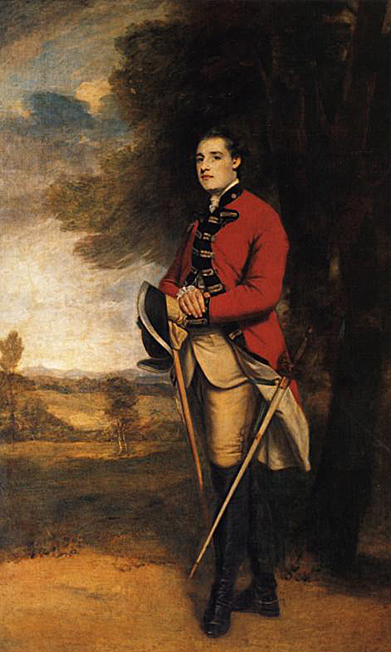
- by Joshua Reynolds (1775/1776)

Comptroller of the Household
- In office 1779–1782
- Preceded by: The Earl of Onslow
- Succeeded by: The Earl Ludlow

Personal details
- Born: 13 February 1751
- Died: 8 August 1805 (aged 54)
- Spouse: Seymour Fleming

Sir Richard Worsley, 7th Baronet, PC, FRS, FSA (13 February 1751 – 8 August 1805), of Appuldurcombe House, Wroxall, Isle of Wight, was a British politician who sat in the House of Commons between 1774 and 1801. He was a noted collector of antiquities.

== Early life ==
Worsley was born on 13 February 1751, at Appuldurcombe, the son of Sir Thomas Worsley, 6th Baronet (1726–1768), by his wife Lady Elizabeth Boyle (1731–1800), the daughter of John Boyle, 5th Earl of Cork, and Lady Henrietta Hamilton, his first wife. He succeeded to his father's baronetcy on 23 September 1768.

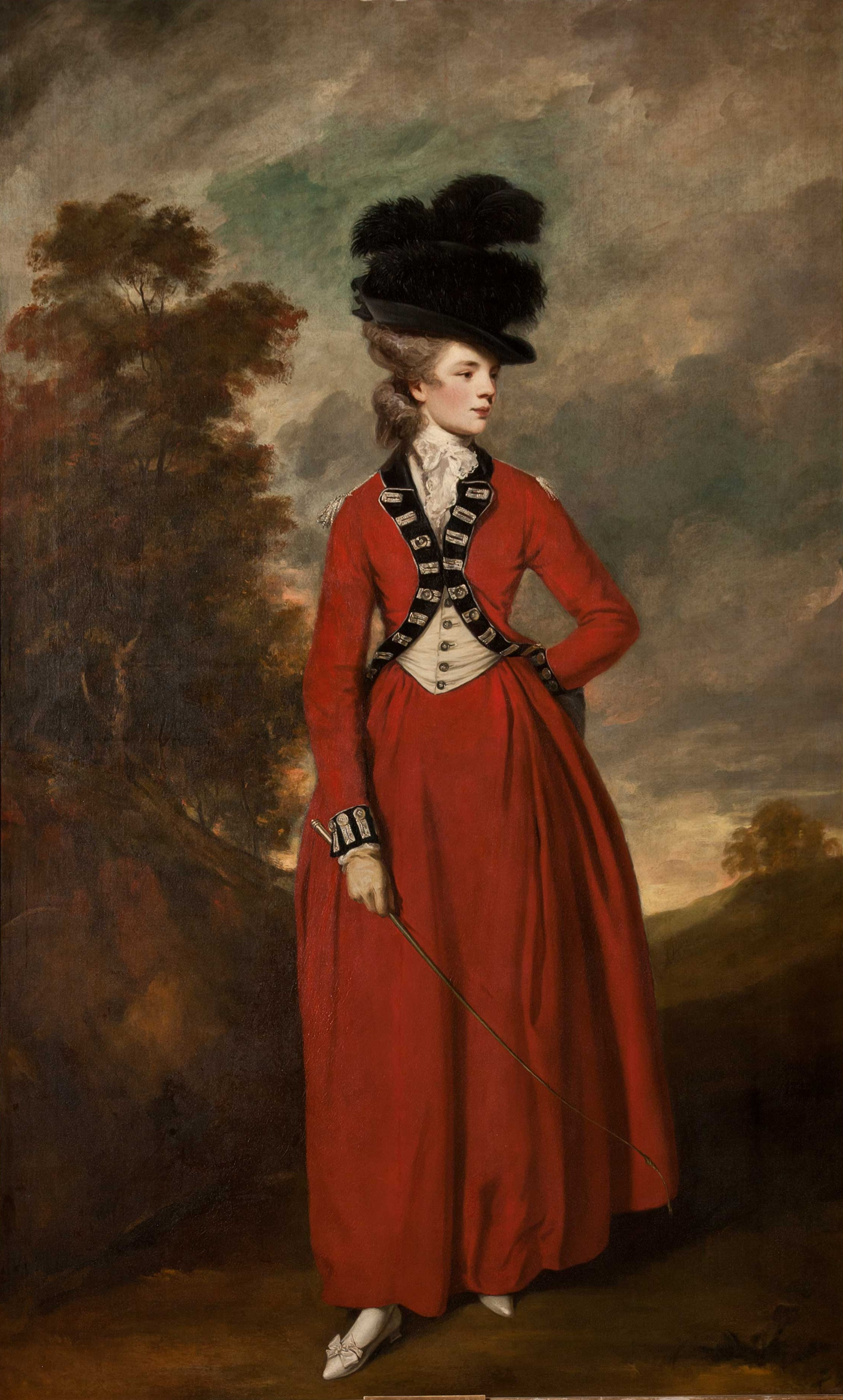
Portrait of Lady Worsley by Joshua Reynolds, 1779. The counterpart painting of Lady Worsley in a riding habit adapted from the uniform of her husband's regiment

Educated at Winchester College, Worsley spent about two years in Naples with his parents from 1765 to 1767, before matriculating at Corpus Christi College, Oxford, on 9 April 1768. Instead of taking a degree, he decided to complete his education with a continental Grand Tour from 1769 to 1770, being tutored by Georges Deyverdun, who was a contact of Edward Gibbon, a family friend.

== Political career ==
After his return to Britain Worsley served as High Sheriff of Hampshire for 1773–1774 and then entered the House of Commons in 1774 for the constituency of Newport. A supporter of the Lord North government, he was appointed a clerk comptroller of the board of green cloth in 1777, comptroller of the king's household (1779–1782), privy councillor (from 1780) and Governor of the Isle of Wight (1780–1782). In 1775 he married.

He was the Major of the South Hampshire Militia (formerly commanded by his father) when it was embodied in 1778 in response to the threat of invasion. He became Colonel of the regiment the following year, and retained the command until his death.

=== 1779–1788 ===
Worsley failed to win a seat at the Hampshire by-election of December 1779 and lost all his offices when the North administration fell in 1782. Scandals involving his wife further damaged his political career. Worsley left for Spain, Portugal, and France (1783–1784, quitting his parliamentary seat after his departure) and wintered in Rome. After further travels, he returned to England in 1788.

=== 1790–1805 ===
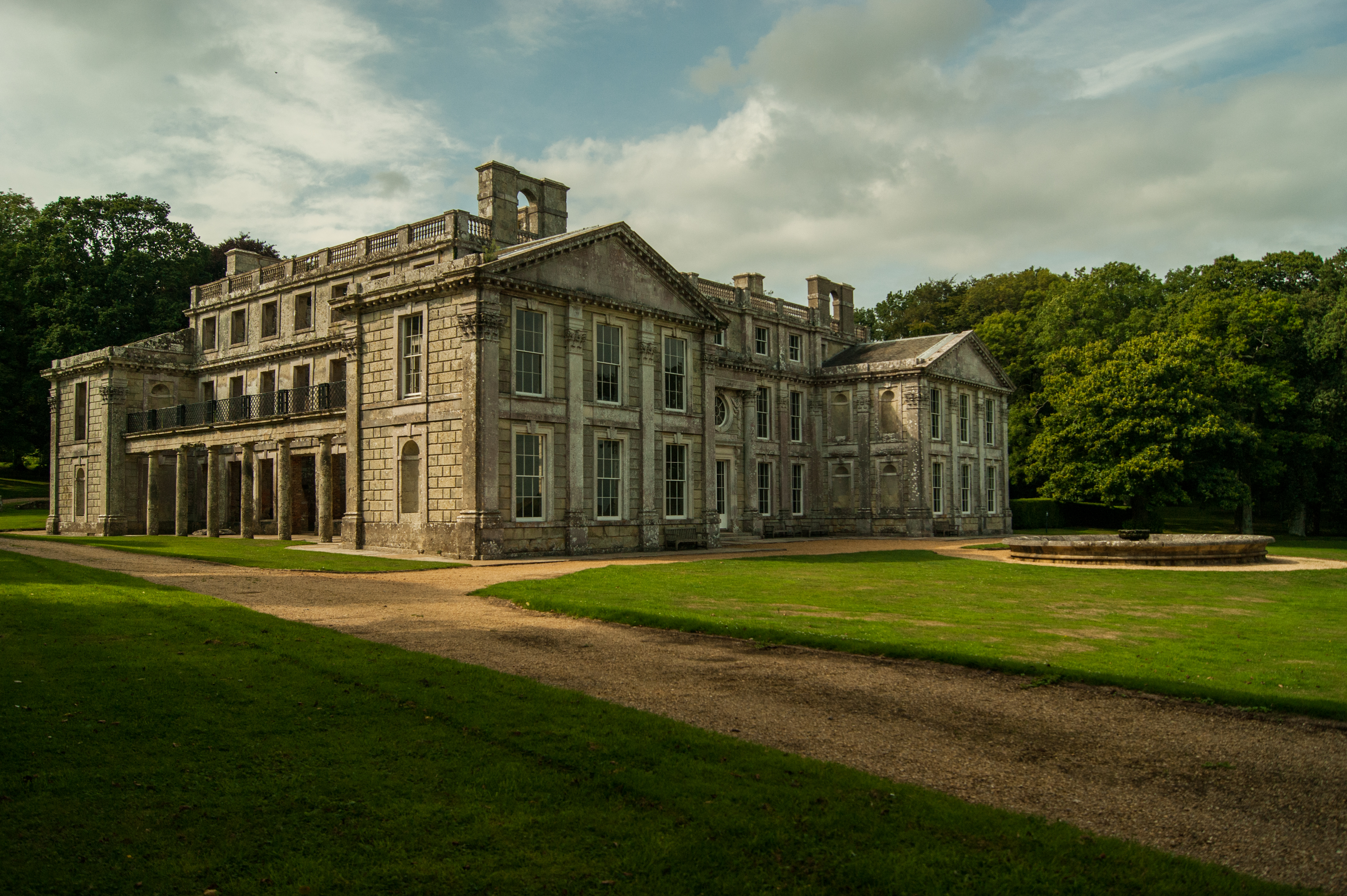
Appuldurcombe House

Worsley re-entered Parliament as MP for Newtown, Isle of Wight, from 1790 to 1793. He became British ambassador to the Republic of Venice from 1794 until Venice's annexation by France in 1797. In the latter post he continued collecting antiquities (the French Revolutionary Wars keeping prices low at the time) and worked hard to keep France's ambassador from taking advantage of Venice's neutrality. He managed to escape Venice when the French invaded, transferring soon after his departure from a civilian convoy to a 14-gun Royal Navy sloop, leaving his art collections from Venice on the convoy with instructions to stay at Fiume to await a more peaceful situation in which to continue to England. He landed in England in mid-September 1797 and received a £600 annuity from the crown for his services.

Having been re-elected in absentia for Newtown in 1796, Worsley held that seat until Pitt the Younger resigned in February 1801, ending his participation in public life.

== Antiquarian and collector ==
In 1778 Worsley was elected a Fellow of both the Society of Antiquaries of London and the Royal Society.

In February 1785 he left Rome for the Levant with Willey Reveley as draughtsman. He visited Athens (from 1785), the Greek interior, Rhodes, Cairo, Constantinople, Sigeion (1786), Troy (1786) and the Crimea. During his travels he built up a collection of gems, paintings, sculpture and reliefs. He lost the paintings when the collection was interned in Portugal during his return from the east to Britain via Rome in 1787–88. In Rome he bought more antiquities from Thomas Jenkins and Giovanni Battista Piranesi, and became a friend of the Spanish ambassador, Jose Nicolas de Azara, and the antiquary Ennio Quirino Visconti (who would later write the text for Worsley's publication of his collections (1794–1805)).

On his return Worsley arranged the collection at his house at Appuldurcombe, where he had the grounds landscaped by Capability Brown. His was the most extensive collection of ancient Greek sculpture in Britain, before the arrival of the Elgin Marbles.

Worsley went into seclusion, principally at Sea Cottage (later known as Marine Villa), which he built in the early 1790s near St Lawrence, in the Undercliff of the Isle of Wight, adding small classical temples in its grounds and making a failed attempt to add a vineyard. In 1801 he received news from a British government agent that a French privateer had brought the ship carrying his art treasures into Málaga and that the paintings onboard had been bought up cheaply by Lucien Bonaparte. Only the antiquities remained, which he reacquired by paying the French bounty on them.

== Last years and death ==
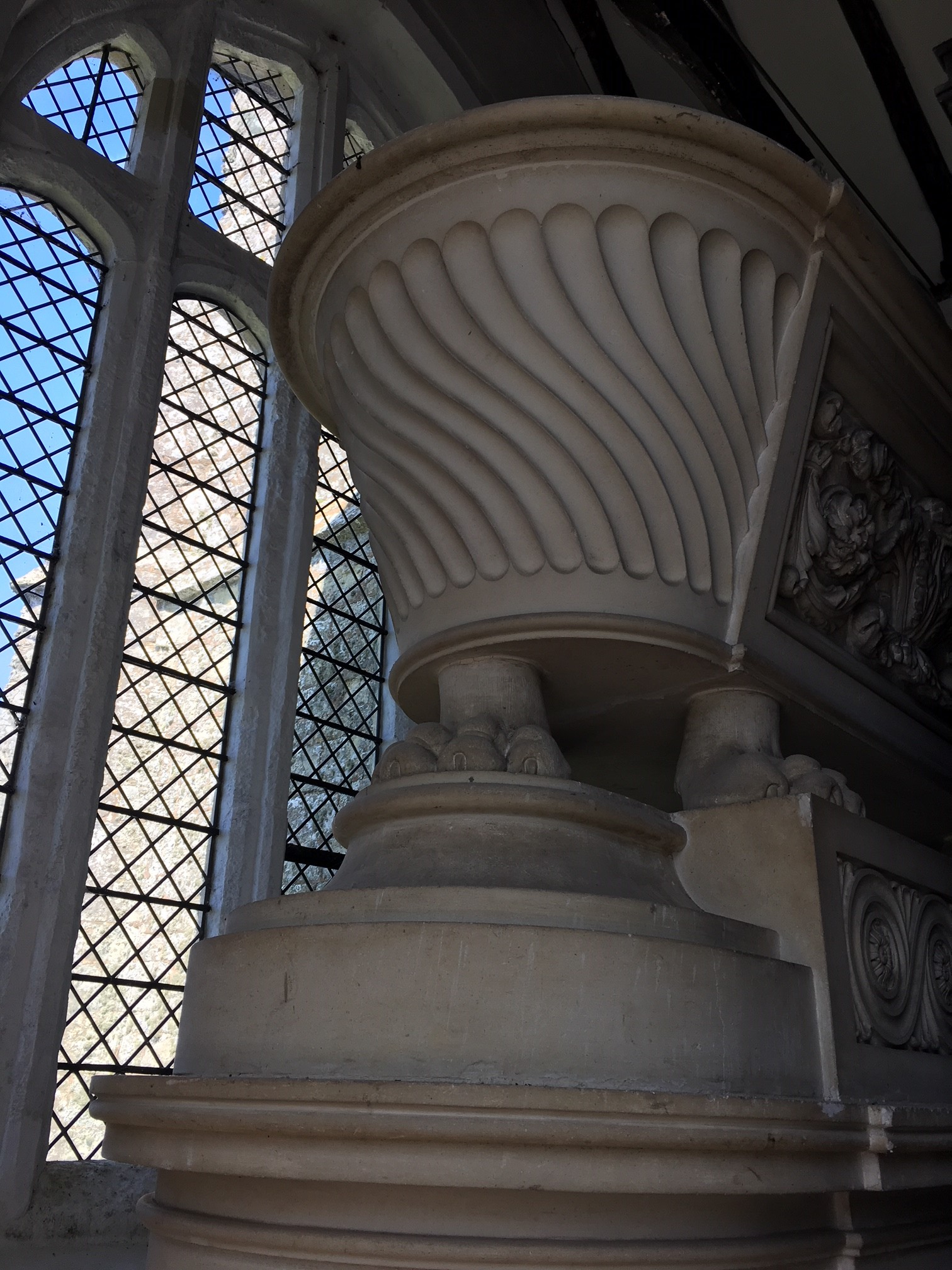
Memorial to Sir Richard Worsley, 7th Baronet, in All Saints' Church, Godshill, Isle of Wight

Poor health prevented Worsley from taking part in defending the Isle of Wight against the Napoleonic invasion threat, but he carried on collecting until his death. He died of apoplexy on 8 August 1805 at Appuldurcombe House and was buried at the parish church at Godshill. Most of Worsley's collections went to Brocklesby Hall.

== Works ==
- Completion of a History of the Isle of Wight by his father and grandfather, 1781
- Museum Worsleianum, or, A collection of antique basso relievos, bustos, statues and gems, with views of places in the Levant taken on the spot in the year MDCCLXXXV, VI and VII. (2 vols., London: From the Shakespeare Press by W. Bulmer & Co., 1794) [This catalogue of his collection has the date 1794 on both title-pages, but was issued serially in six fascicles] – part one issued 1798 (costing £2,887 4s), part one issued 1802. This work was written jointly with Ennio Quirino Visconti.
- Catalogue Raisonné of the Principal Paintings at Appuldurcombe (1804, privately printed)

== Family ==
On 20 September 1775 Worsley married Seymour Fleming, the younger daughter and coheir of Sir John Fleming, 1st Baronet, of Brompton Park, Middlesex, and his wife, Lady Jane Fleming (died 1811). Seymour Fleming brought £52,000 to the marriage, which soon became unhappy. They had one legitimate son, Robert Edwin (1776–1795) and he claimed the paternity of Seymour's daughter, Jane Seymour Worsley, even though he knew her to be the daughter of Seymour's lover, Maurice George Bisset. Bisset was a Hampshire militia officer who lived near them, and was encouraged by Worsley to pursue relations with his wife to experience cuckolding, a long-held amusement of his (but not hers) for the duration of his marriage. This was done to avoid scandal, allowing the affair to remain a secret.

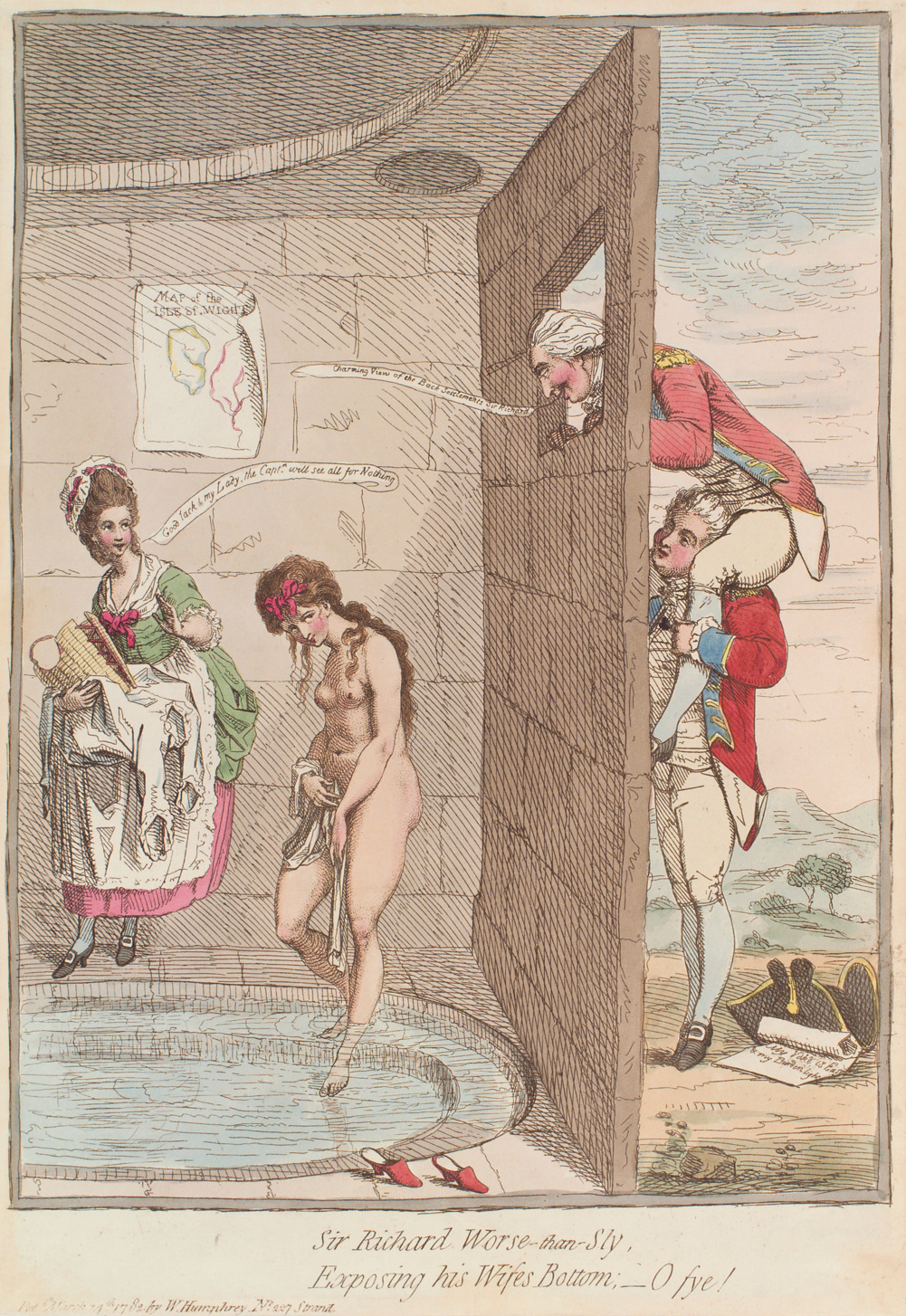
James Gillray cartoon - "Sir Richard Worse-than-sly, exposing his wife's bottom; - o fye!"

His wife was rumoured to have 27 lovers, and in 1782 Worsley brought a criminal conversation case for £20,000 against Bisset. The jury decided that Worsley had connived in the adultery and awarded him only one shilling in damages. In 1788 he and his estranged wife entered into articles of separation. After the separation, she reverted to her birth name, Fleming. Worsley began an affair with a Mrs Sarah Smith, which lasted until his death.

The baronetcy passed to Worsley's fourth cousin, Henry Worsley-Holmes. Fleming's £70,000 jointure reverted to her, and just over a month later, on 12 September, she married John Lewis Cuchet at Farnham.

Worsley left the estate saddled with heavy debts. Appuldurcombe passed to his niece, Henrietta Anna Maria Charlotte (daughter of John Bridgeman Simpson), who married the Hon. Charles Anderson-Pelham, later first earl of Yarborough, in 1806.

Parliament of Great Britain
Preceded by Hon John St John; Hans Sloane	Member of Parliament for Newport; 1774–1784; With: Hans Sloane 1774–1780; Hon John St John 1780–1784	Succeeded by Edward Rushworth; Hon. Hugh Seymour-Conway
Preceded by George Canning; John Barrington	Member of Parliament for Newtown; 1796–1801; With: Charles Shaw Lefevre	Succeeded by Parliament of the United Kingdom
Parliament of the United Kingdom
Preceded by Parliament of Great Britain	Member of Parliament for Newtown; 1801; With: Charles Shaw Lefevre	Succeeded by Sir Edward Law; Charles Shaw Lefevre
Political offices
Preceded by The Earl of Onslow	Comptroller of the Household; 1779–1782	Succeeded by The Earl Ludlow
Diplomatic posts
Preceded by Francis Drake	British Minister Resident to the Republic of Venice; 1793–1797	Abolished
Honorary titles
Preceded by Hans Stanley	Governor of the Isle of Wight; 1780–1782	Succeeded by The Duke of Bolton
Preceded by Hans Stanley	Vice-Admiral of the Isle of Wight; 1780–1791	Succeeded by Thomas Orde
Baronetage of England
Preceded by Thomas Worsley	Baronet (of Appuldurcombe); 1768–1805	Succeeded by Henry Worsley-Holmes
