= Henry Vernon (1718–1765) =

English Member of Parliament

Henry Vernon (13 September 1718 – 25 May 1765), of Hilton Park, Staffordshire, was an English Member of Parliament.

== Early life ==
Vernon was born on 13 September 1718. He was the eldest son of Henry Vernon, MP of Hilton Park by Penelope Philips, daughter and co-heiress of Robert Philips of Newton Regis.

His first cousin was Henry Vernon, an MP for Staffordshire and Newcastle-under-Lyme.

== Career ==
He was a Member (MP) of the Parliament of England for Lichfield from 29 January 1754 to 8 April 1754 and 1761 to December 1762, and for Newcastle-under-Lyme 15 January 1755 to 1761.

From December 1762 until his death, he was Commissioner of Excise.

== Personal life ==
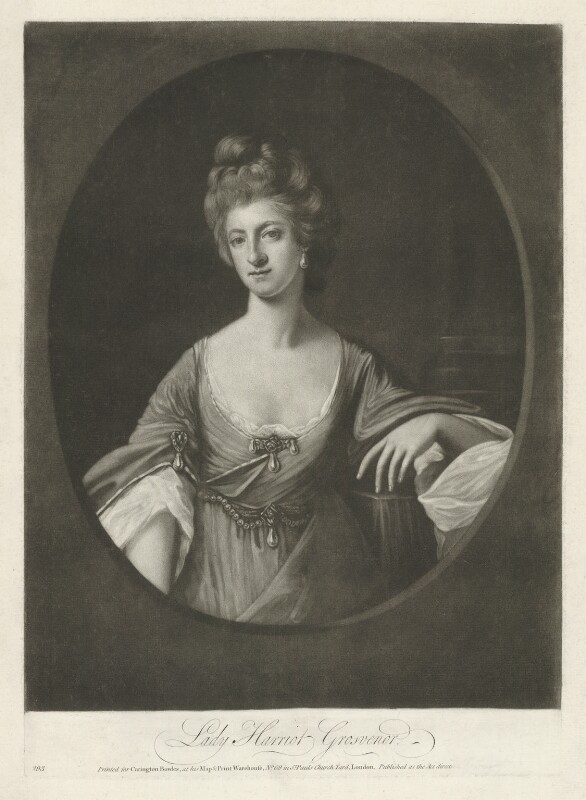
His daughter, Henrietta Grosvenor

In December 1743, Vernon married Lady Henrietta Wentworth, a daughter of Thomas Wentworth, 1st Earl of Strafford (1672–1739). Together, they were the parents of three sons and five daughters, including:

- Henrietta Vernon (c. 1745–1828), who married Richard Grosvenor, 1st Baron Grosvenor. After their divorce, she married George de Hochepied, 6th Baron de Hochepied.
- Henry Vernon (c. 1748–c. 1814), who married Penelope Graham, a daughter of Arthur Graham.
- Anna Vernon (1748–1797), who married Noel Hill, 1st Baron Berwick.
- Leveson Vernon
- Lucy Vernon
- Caroline Vernon
- Jane Vernon

Vernon died on 25 May 1765.
