= Thomas Grosvenor (1734–1795) =

British politician (1734–1795)

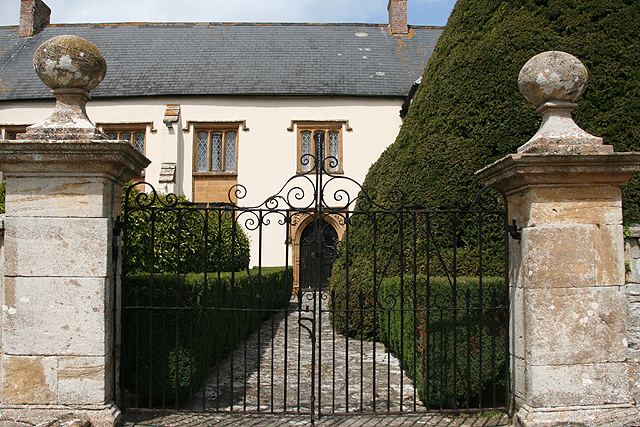
Swell Court, Somerset

Thomas Grosvenor (March 1734 – 12 February 1795) was a British politician who sat in the House of Commons for 40 years from 1755 to 1795.

== Background ==
Grosvenor was the second son of Sir Robert Grosvenor, 6th Baronet, and Jane, daughter and heiress of Thomas Warre of Swell Court, Somerset. Richard Grosvenor, 1st Earl Grosvenor, was his elder brother.

== Political career ==
Grosvenor sat as Member of Parliament for Chester from 1755 to 1795. In 1784 he was the leader of the St. Alban's Tavern group who tried to bring Fox and Pitt together.

== Family ==
Grosvenor died in February 1795, aged 60.

Grosvenor had married Deborah, daughter of Stephen Skynner, in 1758. They lived at Swell Court in Somerset and had four sons and two daughters. Their eldest surviving son Richard Erle-Drax-Grosvenor was a Member of Parliament while their third son Thomas Grosvenor was a distinguished military commander.

Parliament of Great Britain
Preceded by Sir Robert Grosvenor; Richard Grosvenor	Member of Parliament for Chester; 1755–1795; With: Richard Grosvenor 1755–1761; Richard Wilbraham-Bootle 1761–1790; Viscount Belgrave 1790–1795	Succeeded by Viscount Belgrave; Thomas Grosvenor
