= William Almack =

English valet, merchant and tavern owner

Portrait of Almack from the 1870s.

William Almack (1741–1781) was an English valet, merchant and tavern owner, who became the founder of fashionable clubs and assembly-rooms. His Almack's Coffee House was bought in 1774 and became the gentlemen's club, Brooks's.

== Biography ==
According to one account he was descended from a Yorkshire family of Quakers; he came to London at an early age as the valet of the James Douglas-Hamilton, 5th Duke of Hamilton. Towards the middle of the eighteenth century Almack became proprietor of the Thatched House Tavern in St. James's Street. Before 1763 he opened a gaming-club in Pall Mall, which was known as Almack's Club, and from that date till his death he was the leading caterer for the amusement of the fashionable world of London. Among the twenty-seven original members of Almack's Club were the Duke of Portland and Charles James Fox, and it was subsequently joined by Edward Gibbon, William Pitt, and very many noblemen. Brooks's, one of London's most exclusive gentlemen's clubs, was founded in 1764 by 27 men, including four dukes. Its original premises in Pall Mall were managed by the famous William Almack who also set up the iconic Almack's Assembly Rooms in nearby Duke Street. The club is named after Almack's successor Brooks, who only survived its rebuilding by three years.

Almack's was noted for its high play, and Horace Walpole wrote of it in 1770: ‘The gaming of Almack's, which has taken the pas of White's, is worthy of the decline of our empire.’ The club passed subsequently into other hands, and still survives as ‘Brooks's.’ In 1764 Almack erected, from the designs of Milne, out of the profits acquired in his previous speculations, the large assembly-rooms in King Street, St. James's, by which he is chiefly known. They were opened on 20 February 1765, before they were quite completed; and at Almack's inaugural reception, among the visitors, who were not very numerous, were the Duke of Cumberland and Horace Walpole. The weather was bitterly cold, and Horace Walpole writes that, to induce his patrons to attend on the opening day, ‘Almack advertised that the new assembly-room was built with hot bricks and boiling water.’ Gilly Williams, in a letter descriptive of the ceremony addressed to George Selwyn, says: ‘Almack's Scotch face in a bagwig waiting at supper would divert you, as would his lady in a sack, making tea and curtseying to the duchesses.’

The success of the new rooms was rapidly assured. Under the direction of the leaders of London society, weekly subscription-balls were held there for more than seventy-five years during twelve weeks of each London season. The distribution of tickets, which were sold at ten guineas each, was in the hands of a committee of lady-patronesses—‘a feminine oligarchy less in number but equal in power to the Venetian Council of Ten’. At the beginning of the nineteenth century admission to Almack's was described as ‘the seventh heaven of the fashionable world,’ and its high reputation did not decline before 1840. Many other clubs—including the Dilettanti Society and a club of both sexes on the model of that of White's—met at Almack's rooms soon after they were opened.

Almack is said to have lived at Hounslow in his later years, and to have amassed great wealth. He died on 3 January 1781. The assembly-rooms he bequeathed to a niece, the wife of a Mr. Willis, after whom the rooms are now called. He married Elizabeth, elder daughter of William Cullen, of Sanches, Lanarkshire, who was waiting-maid to the Duchess of Hamilton, and sister of Dr. Cullen, the celebrated physician; Almack had by her two children, William, a barrister, who died on 27 October 1806, and Elizabeth, who married David Pitcairn, physician extraordinary to the Prince of Wales.

== See also ==
- The Female Coterie
