= Robert Grosvenor, 1st Marquess of Westminster =

British politician and noble

The Most Honourable The Marquess of Westminster KG
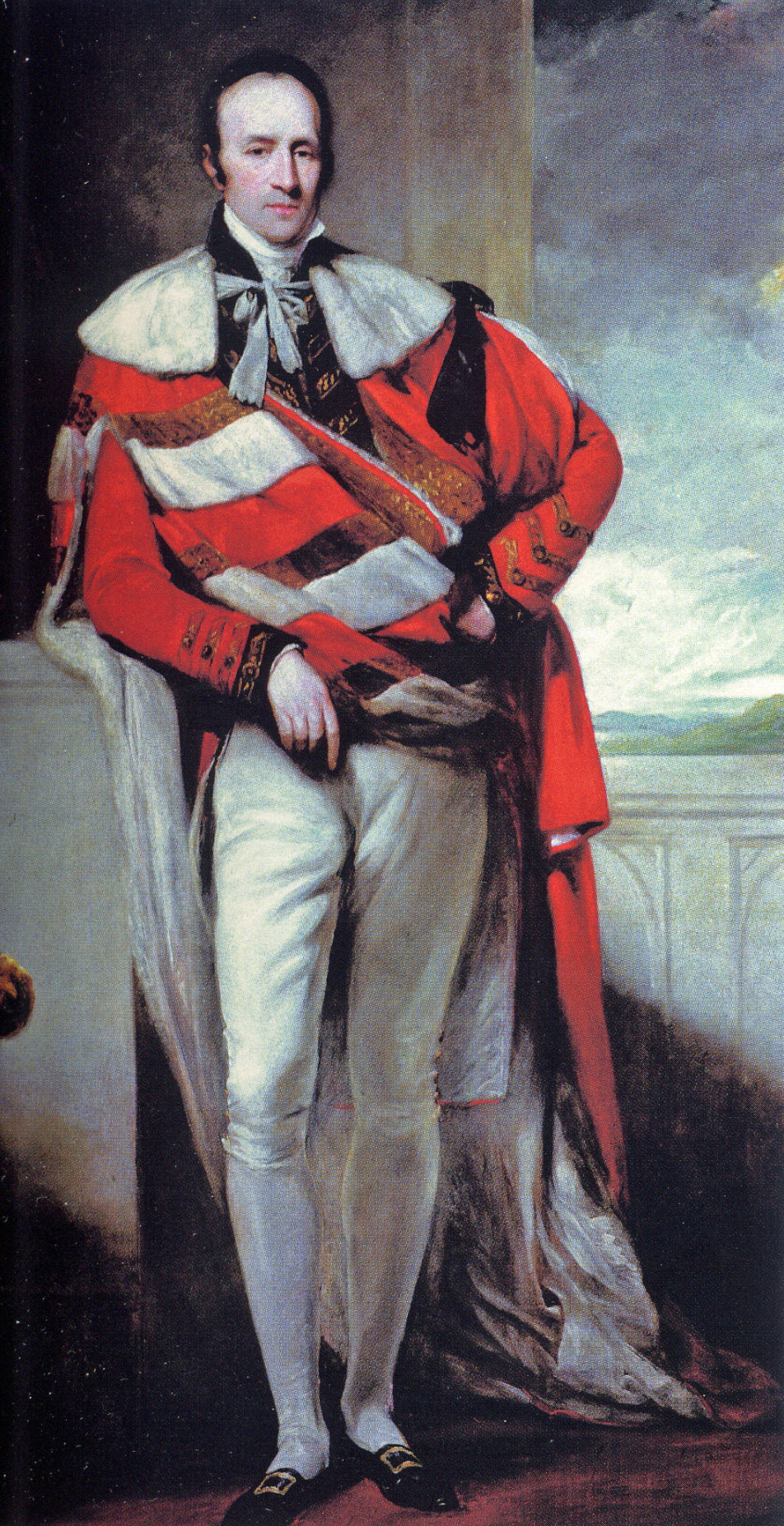
- The Marquess of Westminster by John Jackson

Personal details
- Born: 22 March 1767 St George Hanover Square, London, England
- Died: 17 February 1845 (aged 77) Eaton Hall, Cheshire, England
- Resting place: St Mary's Church, Eccleston, Cheshire
- Party: Tory, then Whig
- Spouse: Eleanor Egerton
- Children: Richard, 2nd Marquess of Westminster; Thomas, 2nd Earl of Wilton; Robert, 1st Baron Ebury
- Parents: Richard Grosvenor, 1st Earl Grosvenor; Henrietta, Lady Grosvenor
- Education: Westminster School; Harrow School; Trinity College, Cambridge

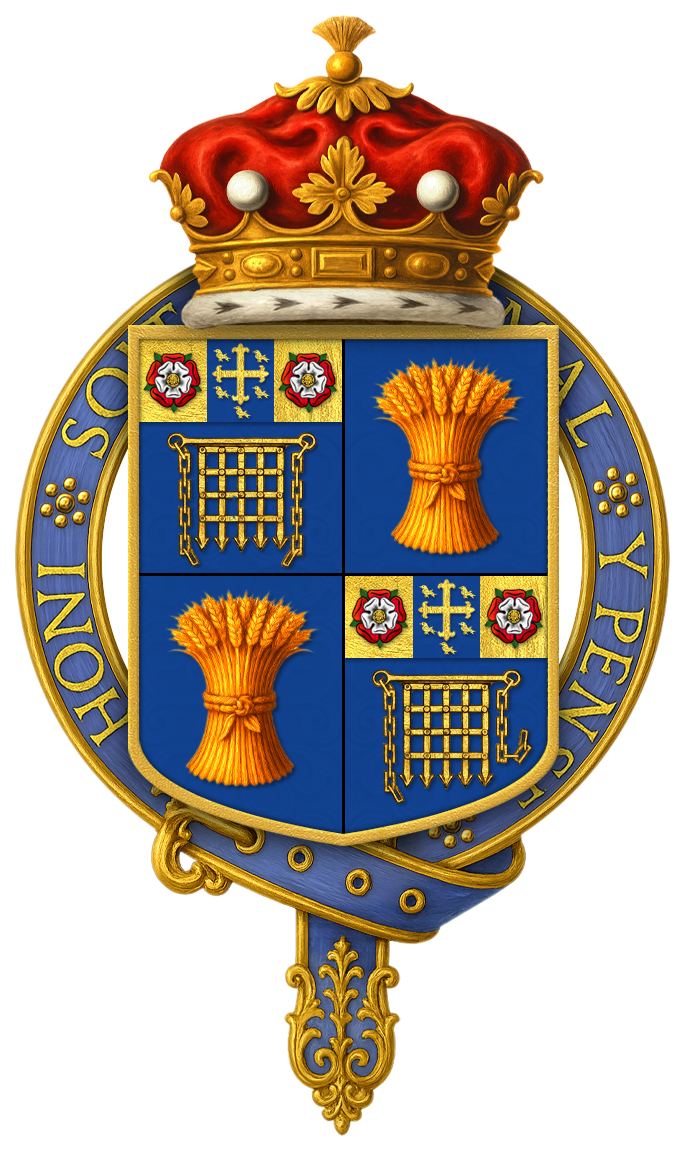
Quartered arms of Robert Grosvenor, 1st Marquess of Westminster, KG

Robert Grosvenor, 1st Marquess of Westminster, KG (22 March 1767 – 17 February 1845) was the son of the 1st Earl Grosvenor, whom he succeeded in 1802 as 2nd Earl Grosvenor. He was created Marquess of Westminster in 1831. He was an English Member of Parliament (MP) and an ancestor of the modern-day Dukes of Westminster. Grosvenor continued to develop the family's London estates, he rebuilt their country house, Eaton Hall in Cheshire where he also restored the gardens, and built a new London home, Grosvenor House. He maintained and extended the family interests in the acquisition of works of art, and in horse racing and breeding racehorses.

== Personal life ==
Robert Grosvenor was born on 22 March 1767 in the parish of St George Hanover Square, London. He was the third son and the only surviving child of Richard Grosvenor, 1st Earl Grosvenor and Henrietta, Lady Grosvenor, and was initially known as Viscount Belgrave. He was educated at Westminster School, Harrow School, and Trinity College, Cambridge, where he graduated MA in 1786. In addition to his formal education, William Gifford acted as his private tutor. Gifford accompanied Grosvenor when the latter undertook his Grand Tour between 1786 and 1788. Gifford described him as a "most amiable" and "accomplished" pupil.

On 28 April 1794 Grosvenor married Eleanor, the only child of Sir Thomas Egerton (later the 1st Earl Wilton). They had four children; in 1795 Richard, Lord Belgrave, who succeeded his father; in 1799 Thomas, who became the 2nd Earl of Wilton on the death of his grandfather; in 1801 Robert, later the 1st Baron Ebury; and finally a daughter, Amelia, who died in her early teenage years.

== Political and public life ==
Grosvenor was elected as MP for East Looe in 1788 and served this constituency until 1790; during this time he was appointed a Lord of the Admiralty. His first speech in the House of Commons of Great Britain contained a quotation from the ancient Greek orator Demosthenes, which led to the satirist Peter Pindar calling him "the lord of Greek". In 1790 he was elected as MP for Chester and continued to serve in this seat until 1802. Between 1793 and 1801 he was a commissioner of the Board of Control. He raised a regiment of volunteers from the city of Westminster to fight against France and in 1798 was appointed its major-commandant. When his father died on 5 August 1802 he became the 2nd Earl Grosvenor. Grosvenor was Mayor of Chester in 1807–08, and was responsible for the building of Thomas Harrison's Northgate in the city in 1810. He served as Lord Lieutenant of Flintshire from 1798 to 1845.

When Grosvenor entered parliament, he continued the family tradition of being a Tory and supporting William Pitt the Younger. However, after Pitt's death in 1806, he changed his allegiance and became a Whig. This led to his support for the victims of the Peterloo massacre, for Catholic Emancipation, for the abolition of the Corn Laws, and his voting for the Reform Bill. He was a man of principle; he championed Queen Caroline and is reputed to have thrown either a Bible or a Prayer Book at the head of King George IV. And when the Duke of Wellington was presented with the freedom of the city of Chester, Grosvenor refused to allow the town hall to be used for the event. In 1819, Grosvenor purchased the parliamentary borough of Shaftesbury in Dorset for £60,000, acquiring roughly 400 voting properties to secure the return of his chosen candidates. During the 1830 general election, his political control of the town was challenged by the radical reformer Francis Knowles, sparking election riots and protests against Grosvenor's local agents. Although Grosvenor's nominees won the contest after the returning officer—who also served as Grosvenor's agent—rejected 24 votes cast for Knowles, Grosvenor ordered his agents to carry out "exemplary punishments" against defiant voters, resulting in 33 tenants being served with eviction notices. The relations between Grosvenor and the king later improved, and in the coronation honours of 1831 he was created Marquess of Westminster. He participated in the coronation of Queen Victoria in 1837. On 11 March 1841 he was received as a Knight of the Garter.

== Development of the estate ==
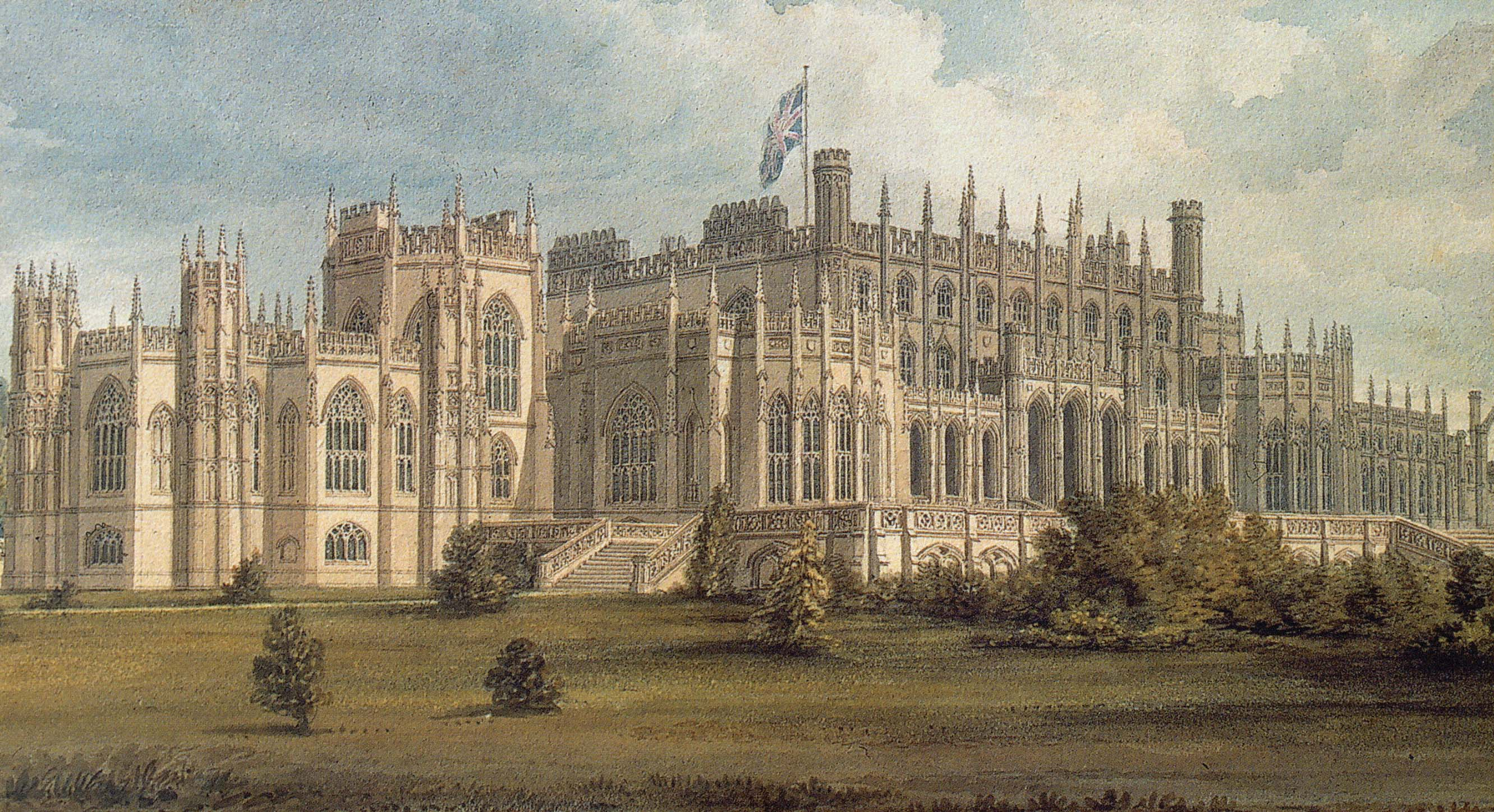
Porden's Eaton Hall

Soon after Robert Grosvenor inherited the Eaton estate, he rebuilt the country house at Eaton Hall in Cheshire, and he also developed the London estate, creating the areas now known as Belgravia and Pimlico. Eaton had become "an unfashionable and run-down estate". The existing country house had been built for his great-grandfather, Sir Thomas Grosvenor, 3rd Baronet and designed by William Samwell. He appointed William Porden as architect, who had previously surveyed his London estate. The original plan was for the new house to cost £10,000 (equivalent to £890,000 as of 2025), and for it to take two years to build. In the event, it took just under ten years and cost over £100,000 (equivalent to £6,000,000 as of 2025). The previous house was encased and surrounded by "every possible permutation of the gothic style". It included turrets, pinnacles, arched windows, octagonal towers, and buttresses (both regular and flying). Four new wings were added to the house. When the future Queen Victoria visited in 1832 at the age of 13, she wrote in her journal: "The house is magnificent". However, others described it as being "as extravagant and opulent as the very latest upholsterer-decorators could make it". It was described as "the most gaudy concern I ever saw" and "a vast pile of mongrel gothic which ... is a monument of wealth, ignorance and bad taste".

To restore the gardens and grounds, Grosvenor employed John Webb, a pupil of William Emes, who had been the previous designer of the landscaping around the house. New terrace walls were created on the east side of the house. Belgrave Avenue, the approach to the house from the west, was levelled and drained, and 130,000 trees were planted along it. The paths along the approach, which was 1.75 miles (3 km) long, were made between 18 feet (5 m) and 20 feet (6 m) wide, so that they would be suitable for the use of carriages. On the east side of the house, a serpentine lake was created on the near side of the River Dee. By the 1820s, formal garden beds were becoming fashionable and William Andrews Nesfield was employed to design formal parterres around the house. He added more terracing, balustraded walls, and flower beds surrounded by box edging.

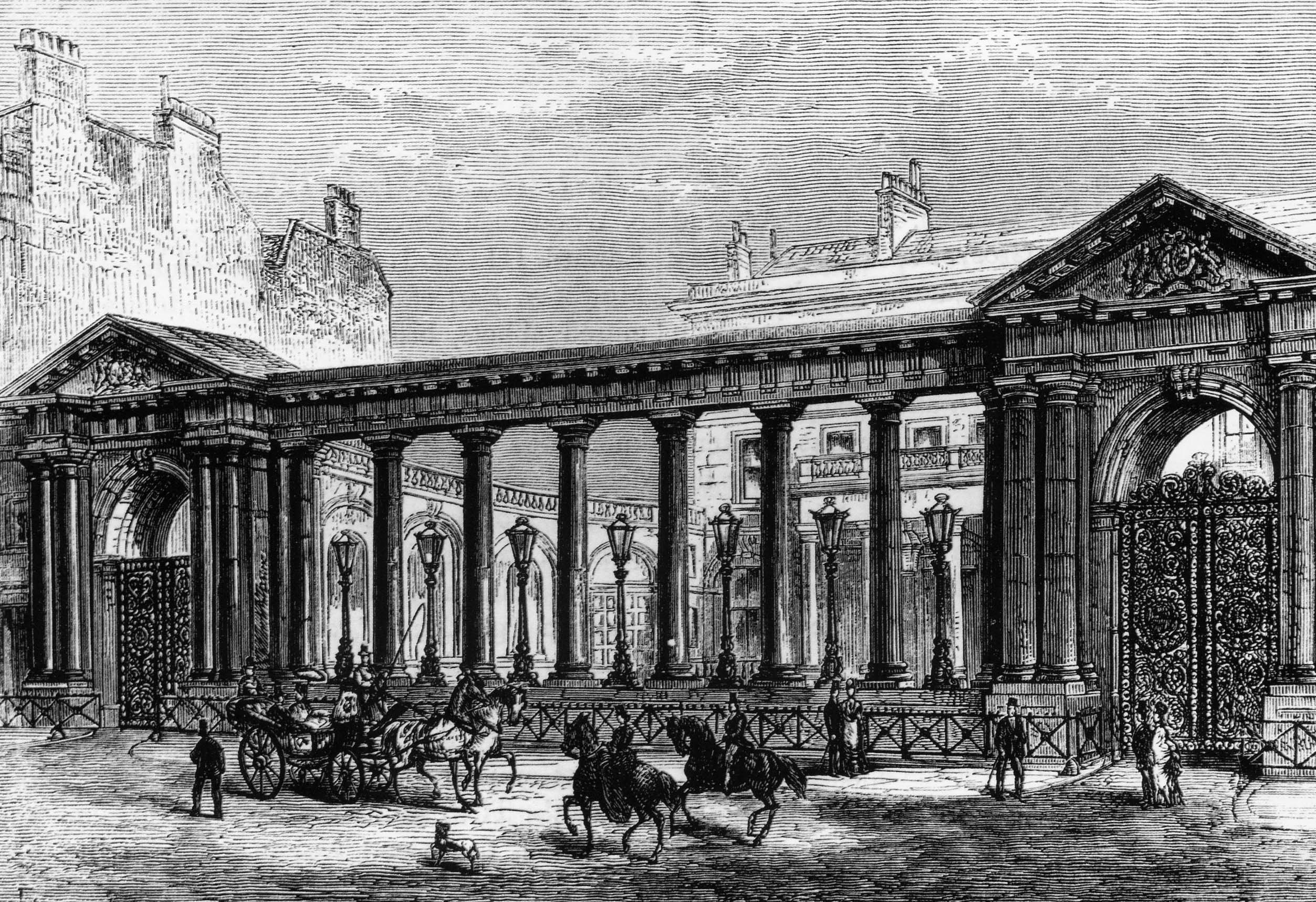
Grosvenor House, showing the new entrance

For the London estate, Grosvenor created a "fashionable new residential quarter" near Buckingham House (later Buckingham Palace). He appointed Thomas Cundy as architect and surveyor, and Thomas Cubitt as builder. The entry in the Oxford Dictionary of National Biography states: "This urban development was to make the Grosvenors one of the richest families in Britain". He also bought more property in Cheshire, at Shaftesbury in Dorset, and at Stockbridge in Hampshire. The family's London house had been in Millbank, but in 1806 Grosvenor bought a house in Upper Grosvenor Street and greatly extended it; this was to become Grosvenor House. He added an art gallery to the Park Lane side of the house in 1827 and built a new entrance in Upper Grosvenor Street consisting of a Doric screen between large pedimented gateways that separated a cour d'honneur from the street in the Parisian manner in 1843.

== Personal interests ==
Grosvenor continued the family's interests in art and horse racing. He added to the art collection; his acquisitions included four paintings by Rubens for which he paid £10,000, and he paid £100 for Gainsborough's The Blue Boy. To develop the facilities for horse racing, he expanded the Eaton Stud. The finest horse produced by the stud during Grosvenor's time was Touchstone. This horse won 16 of the 21 races for which it was entered, including the St Leger, and on two occasions, the Ascot Gold Cup and the Doncaster Cup. After retirement, the horse sired 323 winners of over 700 races.

== Death ==
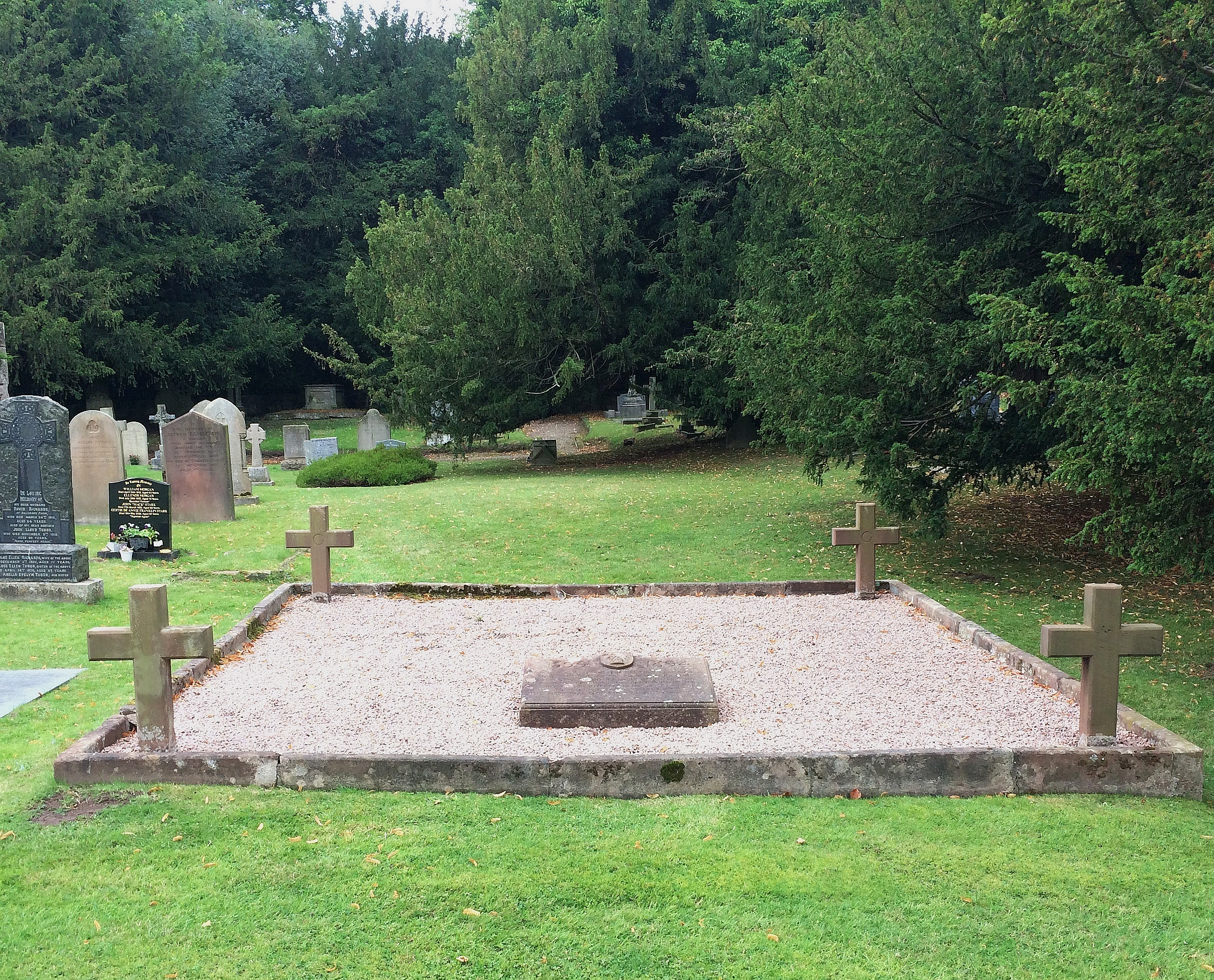
St Mary's Church, Eccleston: the enclosure which marks the site of the Grosvenor family vault within the demolished old church

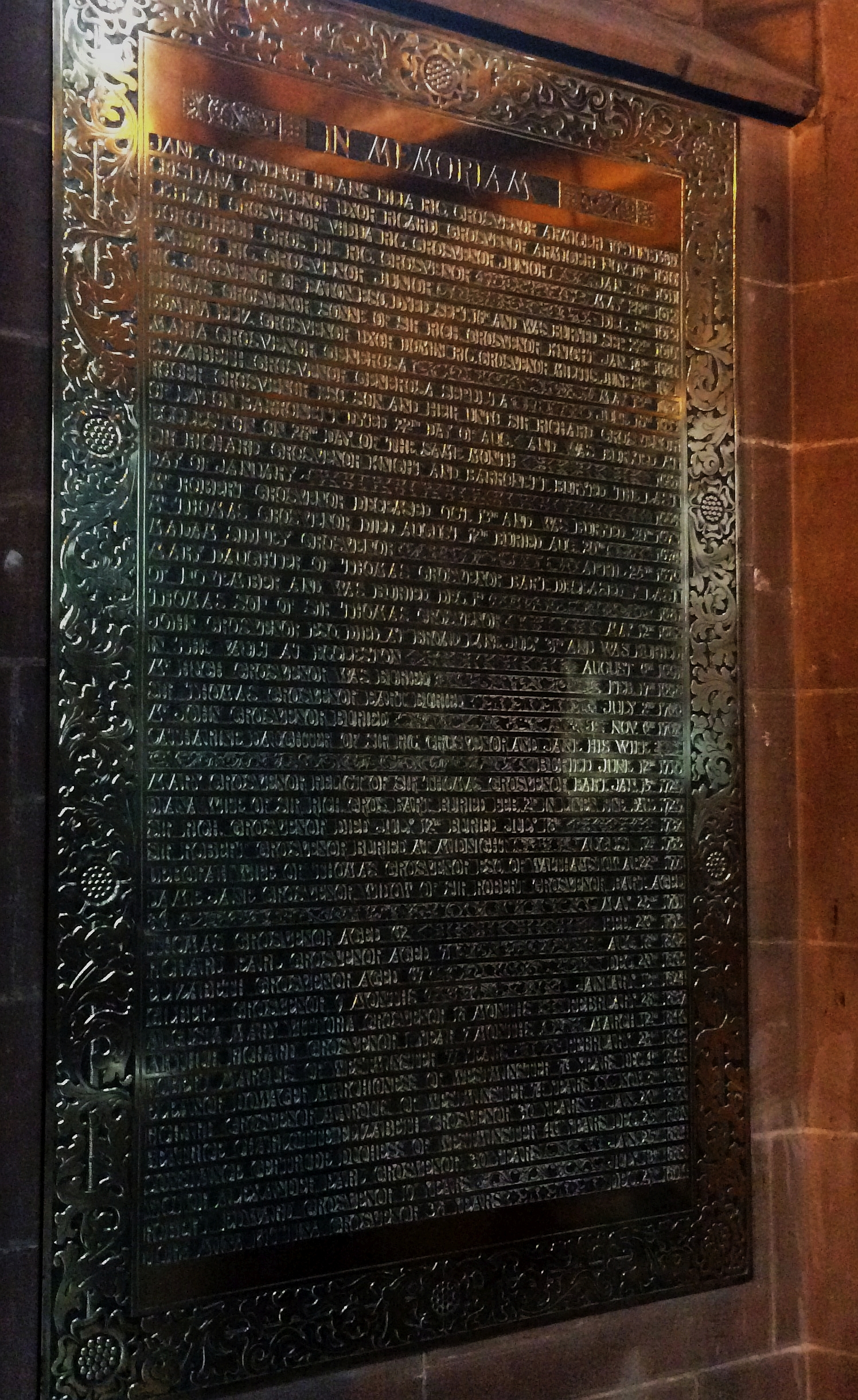
St Mary's Church, Eccleston: the tablet in the new church which lists the Grosvenors buried in the demolished old church

Grosvenor died at Eaton Hall on 17 February 1845 and was buried in the family vault at St Mary's Church, Eccleston. He was succeeded by his eldest son, Richard Grosvenor, 2nd Marquess of Westminster. In 1998 a statue of Grosvenor, by Jonathan Wylder, was erected in Belgrave Square, London. On the statue is a quotation by Ruskin that reads "When we build let us think we build for ever".

Parliament of Great Britain
Preceded by Alexander Irvine; Richard Grosvenor	Member of Parliament for East Looe; 1788–1790; With: Alexander Irvine 1788–1790; The Earl of Carysfort 1790	Succeeded by Hon. William Wellesley-Pole; Robert Wood
Preceded by Richard Wilbraham-Bootle; Thomas Grosvenor	Member of Parliament for Chester; 1790–1801; With: Thomas Grosvenor 1790–1795; Thomas Grosvenor 1795–1801	Succeeded by Parliament of the United Kingdom
Parliament of the United Kingdom
Preceded by Parliament of Great Britain	Member of Parliament for Chester; 1801–1802; With: Thomas Grosvenor	Succeeded by Thomas Grosvenor; Richard Erle-Drax-Grosvenor
Honorary titles
Preceded by The Lord Kenyon	Lord Lieutenant of Flintshire; 1798–1845	Succeeded by Sir Stephen Glynne, Bt
Preceded by The Lord Kenyon	Custos Rotulorum of Flintshire; 1802–1845	Succeeded by Sir Stephen Glynne, Bt
Peerage of the United Kingdom
New creation	Marquess of Westminster; 1831–1845	Succeeded by Richard Grosvenor
Peerage of Great Britain
Preceded by Richard Grosvenor	Earl Grosvenor; 1802–1845	Succeeded by Richard Grosvenor
