= The Female Coterie =

Group of "ladies of quality" in 18th century London

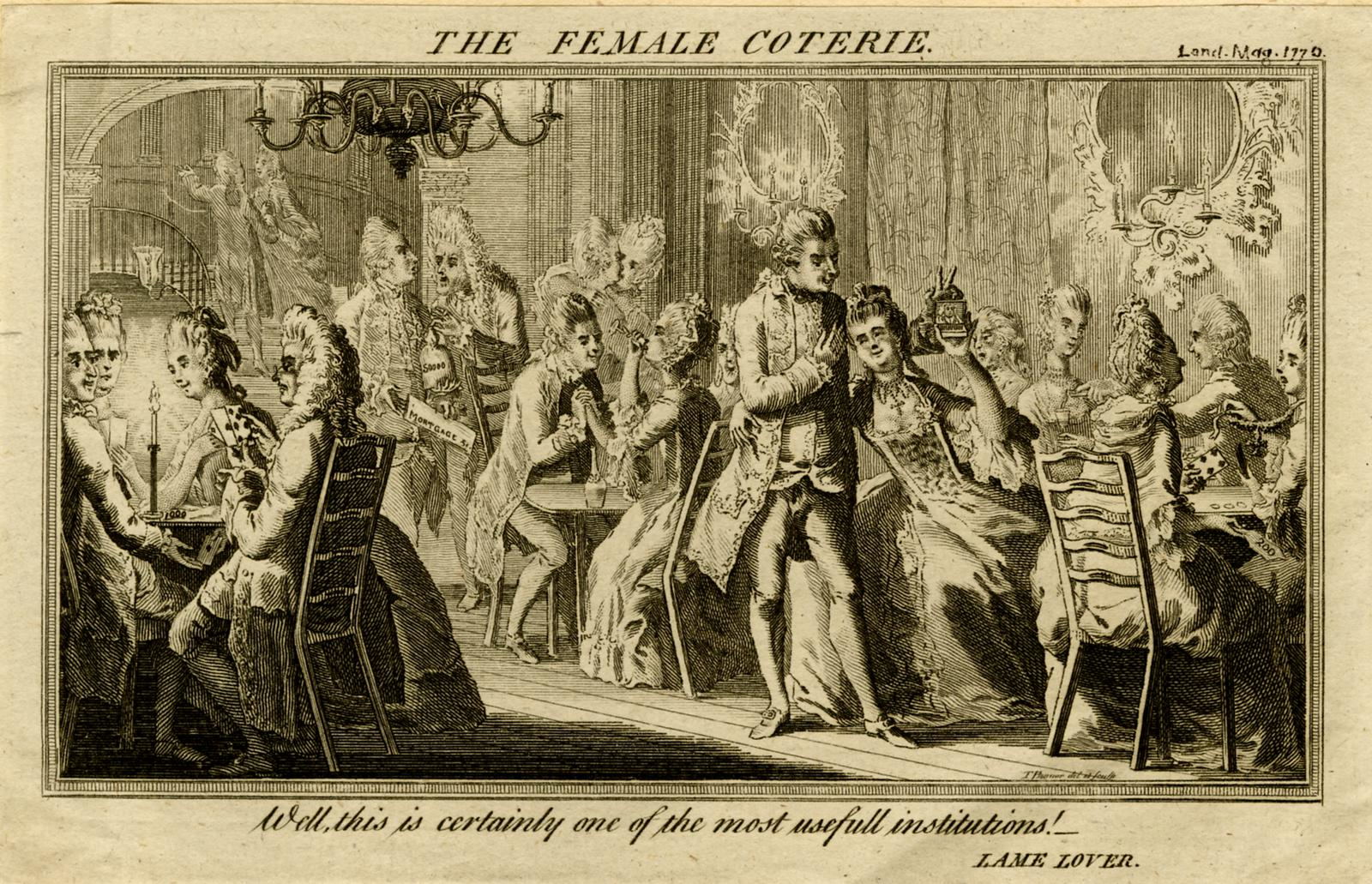
Satire on the Coterie, presumably the one about which Horace Walpole wrote to George Montague on 6 May 1770.

The Female Coterie was the title given to a group of "ladies of quality" in 18th century London. Horace Walpole described their activities as meeting every morning "either to play cards, chat or do whatever else they please". Dinner and supper were provided, followed by the card game loo. The founding members were Mrs Fitzroy, Lady Pembroke, Mrs Meynell, Lady Molyneux, Miss Pelham and Miss Lloyd.

== History ==
The society was founded in 1769 by William Almack, already proprietor of the clubs later to become Boodle's and Brooks's, then based at his houses in Nos. 49 and 50 Pall Mall, and of the famous Assembly Rooms on King Street. The society first met on 17 December 1769 and soon attracted a great deal of attention. On 6 May 1770 Horace Walpole recorded that:

"There is a new institution that begins to make, and if it proceeds, will make a considerable noise. It is a club of both sexes to be erected at Almack's, on the model of that of the men of White's...I am ashamed to say I am of so young and fashionable a society; but as they are people I live with, I choose to be idle rather than morose. I can go to a young supper without forgetting how much sand is run out of the hour-glass." The most important rules were that all members were admitted by ballot and 'the ladies shall ballot for men, and men for ladies'; thus 'no lady can exclude a lady, or gentleman a gentleman'. The subscription was five guineas; dinner was to be on the table at halfpast four in the afternoon, price eight shillings "exclusive of the wine, which the men are to pay". Members met "every morning, either to play cards, chat, or do whatever else they please. An ordinary is provided for as many as choose to dine, and a supper to be constantly on the table by eleven at night; after supper they play loo..."

By September 1770 this very exclusive club possessed 123 members, including five dukes. It is not certain in which of Almack's two houses in Pall Mall it met; Mrs. Elizabeth Harris placed it at Boodle's (No. 50) but an undated letter of the Hon. Mrs. Boscawen says that it met 'for the present, at certain rooms of Almack's, who for another year is to provide a private house . .' By December 1771 it had moved to Albemarle Street; it remained there under the management of Robert Sutton until 1775, when it moved to Arlington Street under the management of James Cullen. The last meeting of the club was held on 4 December 1777. Cullen was left heavily in debt and the Chancery suit which he subsequently brought against certain members contains valuable information about the way in which such short-lived proprietary clubs were managed.

=== The New Female Coterie ===
The New Female Coterie was founded by Caroline Stanhope, Countess of Harrington, who had been blackballed by the founders of the original Female Coterie. This group of demimondaines, which included Seymour Dorothy Fleming (whose sister was the Countess of Harrington's daughter-in-law, Jane Stanhope), met in a brothel owned by Sarah Pendergast.
