= Criminal conversation =

Tort arising from adultery

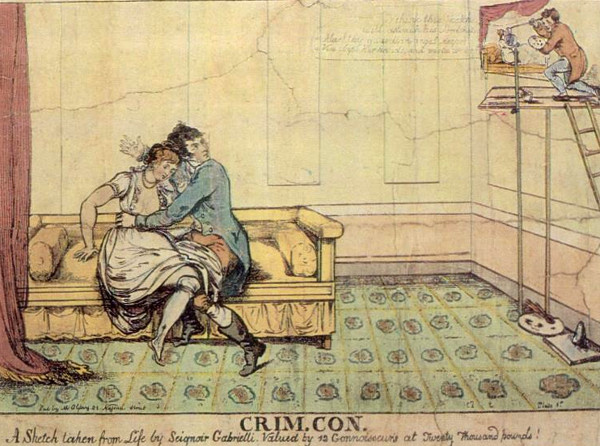
Crim. Con, a cartoon of Sir John Piers and Lady Cloncurry witnessed in an embrace by the painter Gaspare Gabrielli. The caption claims that the sketch "has been valued by 12 Connoisseurs at Twenty Thousand pounds!", a satirical allusion to the sum awarded to Lord Cloncurry by the jury in the ensuing criminal conversation court case of 1807.

At common law, criminal conversation, often abbreviated as crim. con., is a tort arising from adultery. "Conversation" is an old euphemism for sexual intercourse that is obsolete except as part of this term.

It is similar to breach of promise, a tort involving a broken engagement against the betrothed, and alienation of affections, a tort action brought by a spouse against a third party, who interfered with the marriage relationship. These torts have been abolished in most jurisdictions. The tort of criminal conversation was abolished in England and Wales in 1857; in Northern Ireland in 1939; in Australia in 1975; and in the Republic of Ireland in 1981. Prior to its abolition, a husband could sue any man who had intercourse with his wife, regardless of whether she consented – unless the couple was already separated, in which case the husband could only sue if the separation was caused by the person he was suing.

Criminal conversation still exists in parts of the United States, but the application has changed. At least 29 states have abolished the tort by statute and another four have abolished it judicially. The tort of criminal conversation seeks damages for the act of sexual intercourse outside marriage, between the spouse and a third party. Each act of adultery can give rise to a separate claim for criminal conversation.

== History ==
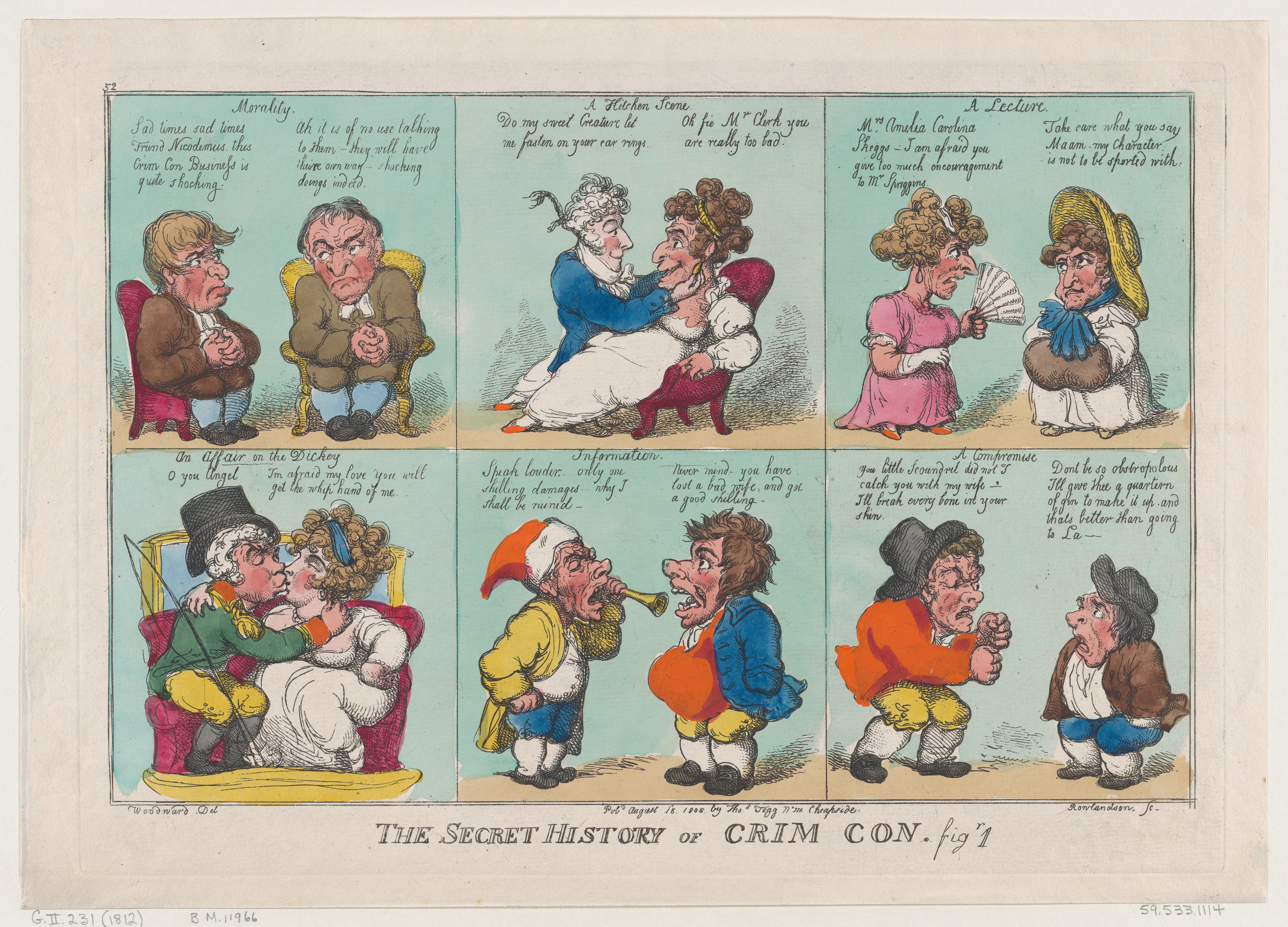
The Secret History of Crim Con., 1808 etching by Thomas Rowlandson, lampooning various aspects of adulterous affairs

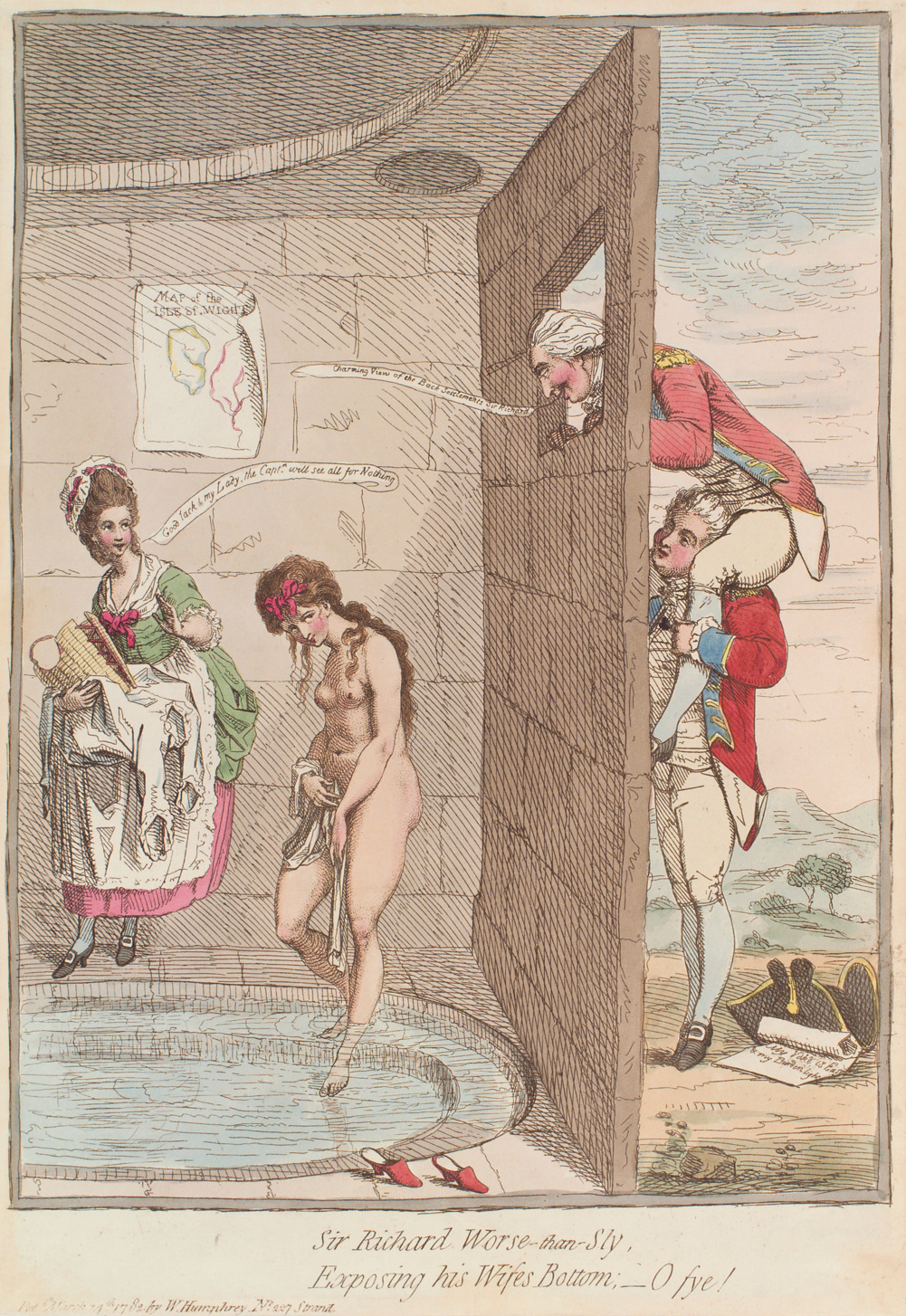
1782 cartoon by James Gillray, depicting Sir Richard Worsley helping George Bisset view his wife, Seymour Fleming, naked in a bath-house. The caption reads: "Sir Richard Worse-than-Sly / Exposing his Wifes Bottom; – O fye!"

=== England and Wales ===
Initially, criminal conversation was an action brought by a husband for compensation for the breach of fidelity with his wife. Only a husband could be the plaintiff, and only the "other man" could be the defendant.

Suits for criminal conversation reached their height in late 18th- and early 19th-century England, where large sums, often between £10,000 and £20,000 (worth upwards of £1–2 million in today's terms), could be demanded by the plaintiff for the debauching of his wife. These suits were conducted at the Court of the King's Bench in Westminster Hall, and were highly publicised by publishers such as Edmund Curll and in the newspapers of the day. Although neither the plaintiff, defendant, nor the wife accused of the adultery was permitted to take the stand, evidence of the adulterous behaviour was presented by servants or observers.

The specific tort of criminal conversation (although not the principle that a cuckolded husband was entitled to compensation from his adulterer) was abolished under the Matrimonial Causes Act 1857.

==== Notable cases ====
A number of sensational cases involving members of the aristocracy gained public notoriety in the 18th and early 19th centuries.

- In the 1769 case of Grosvenor v Cumberland, Lord Grosvenor sued the King's brother, the Duke of Cumberland, for criminal conversation with his wife, and was awarded damages of £10,000.
- In the 1782 case of Worsley v Bisset, Sir Richard Worsley won a technical victory against George Bisset, but was awarded the derisory sum of only one shilling damages. The fact of adultery was not contested, but it was found that he had colluded in his own dishonour by showing his friend his wife, Seymour Dorothy Fleming, naked in a bath-house.
- In 1796, the Earl of Westmeath was awarded £10,000 against his wife's lover, Augustus Cavendish-Bradshaw.
- In 1807, Lord Cloncurry brought a much-publicized action for criminal conversation against his former friend Sir John Piers, and was awarded damages of £20,000.
- In 1836, George Chapple Norton sued Lord Melbourne, the Whig Prime Minister, for criminal conversation with his wife, Caroline, who had left him. The jury threw out the claim, but the negative publicity almost brought down the government.

=== Australia ===
In the state of New South Wales, the tort of criminal conversation was abolished by section 92 of the Matrimonial Causes Act 1899 (NSW). In the state of Victoria, the tort of criminal conversation was abolished by section 146 of the Marriage Act 1915 (Vic), although that act also provided for a husband to seek damages from a man guilty of adultery with his wife as part of divorce proceedings (sections 147–149). In Tasmania, action for criminal conversation was abolished in 1860 by the Matrimonial Causes Act (24 Vic, No 1), section 50.

It was abolished under Commonwealth law by section 44(5) of the Matrimonial Causes Act 1959 (Cth), which was restated by section 120 of the Family Law Act 1975 (Cth).

== Current usage: United States ==
The tort is still recognized in a number of states in the United States, although it has been abolished either legislatively or judicially in most.

The tort has seen particular use in North Carolina. In the case of Cannon v. Miller, 71 N.C. App. 460, 322 S.E.2d 780 (1984), the North Carolina Court of Appeals (the state's intermediate appellate court) abolished the tort of criminal conversation, as well as the tort of alienation of affections, in the state. However, the North Carolina Supreme Court summarily vacated the Court of Appeals' decision shortly thereafter, saying in a brief opinion that the Court of Appeal had improperly sought to overrule earlier decisions of the Supreme Court. Cannon v. Miller, 313 N.C. 324, 327 S.E.2d 888 (1985). In 2009, the General Assembly approved legislation which placed some limits on such lawsuits. The bill was signed into law by Governor Bev Perdue on August 3, 2009, and is codified under Chapter 52 of the North Carolina General Statutes:

§ 52-13. Procedures in causes of action for alienation of affection and criminal conversation.

1. No act of the defendant shall give rise to a cause of action for alienation of affection or criminal conversation that occurs after the plaintiff and the plaintiff's spouse physically separate with the intent of either the plaintiff or plaintiff's spouse that the physical separation remain permanent.
2. An action for alienation of affection or criminal conversation shall not be commenced more than three years from the last act of the defendant giving rise to the cause of action.
3. A person may commence a cause of action for alienation of affection or criminal conversation against a natural person only.

Each of the three limitations arose from a recent North Carolina legal case involving the tort. In Jones v. Skelley, 195 N.C. App. 500, 673 S.E.2d 385 (2009), the North Carolina Court of Appeals had held that the tort applies even to legally separated spouses. In Misenheimer v. Burris, 360 N.C. 620, 637 S.E.2d 173 (2006), the North Carolina Supreme Court held that the statute of limitations commences when the affair should have been discovered rather than when it occurred. In Smith v. Lee, 2007 U.S. Dist. LEXIS 78987, the Federal District Court for the Western District of North Carolina noted that the question of whether an employer could be held liable for an affair conducted by an employee on a business trip was still unsettled in North Carolina.
