= Seymour Fleming =

18th-century British noblewoman

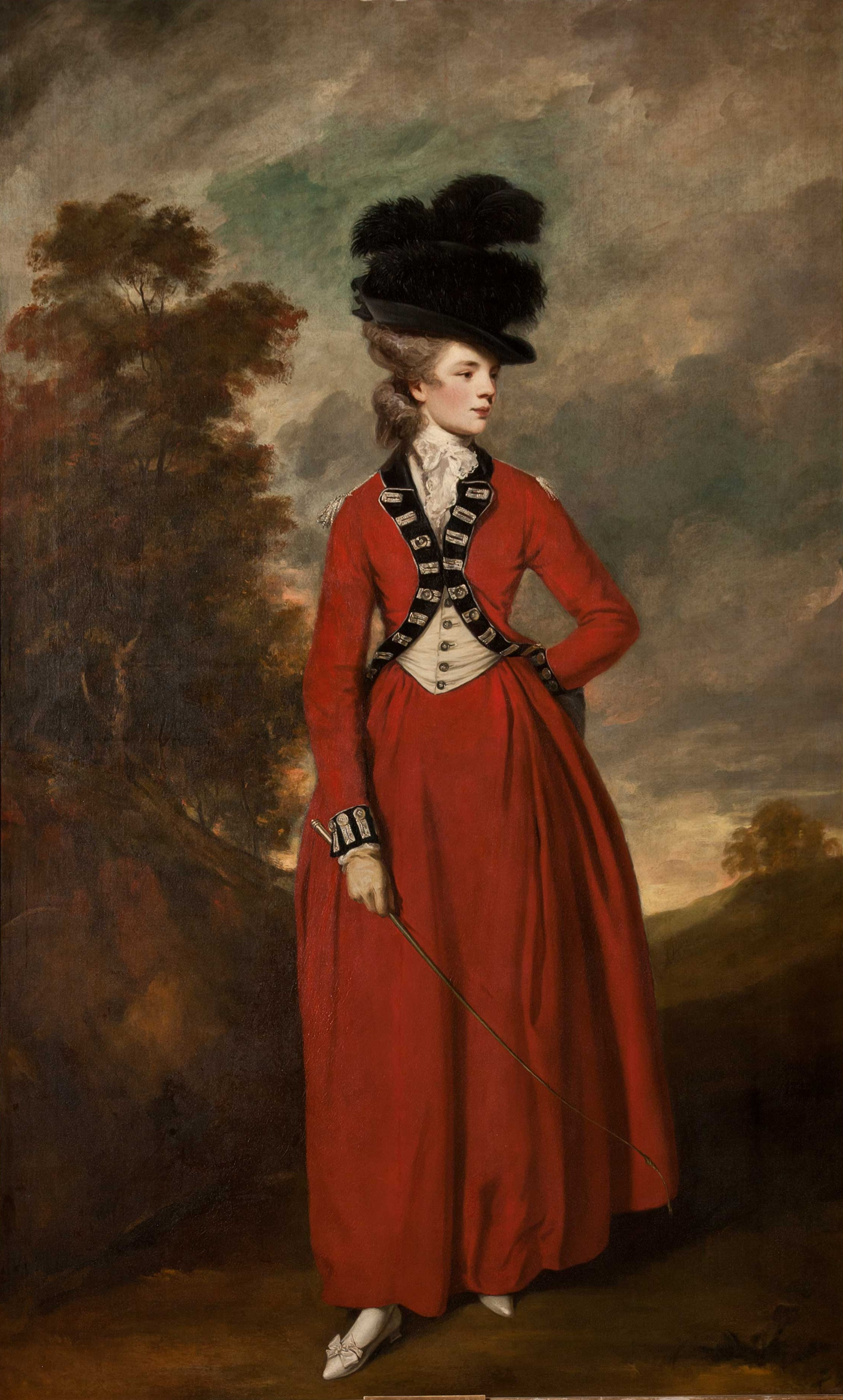
- Portrait of Lady Worsley by Joshua Reynolds, 1779. She is shown in a riding habit adapted from the uniform of her husband's regiment; now at Harewood House
- Born: Seymour Dorothy Fleming; 5 October 1758; Middlesex, England
- Died: 9 September 1818 (aged 59); Passy, Paris, France
- Burial place: Père Lachaise Cemetery, Paris, France
- Spouses: Sir Richard Worsley, 7th Baronet (m. 1775; died 1805) John Lewis Cuchet (m. 1805)
- Children: Charlotte Dorothy Hammond (née Cochard) with Worsley: Robert Edwin Worsley with Maurice George Bisset: Jane Seymour Worsley (ill.)
- Parent(s): Sir John Fleming, 1st Baronet; Jane Coleman
- Relatives: Jane Stanhope, Countess of Harrington (sister)

Seymour Dorothy Fleming (5 October 1758 – 9 September 1818), styled Lady Worsley from 1775 to 1805, was a member of the British gentry, notable for her involvement in a high-profile criminal conversation trial.

== Early life and family ==
Fleming was the younger daughter and coheir of the Irish-born Sir John Fleming, 1st Baronet (d. 1763), of Brompton Park (aka Hale House, Cromwell House), Middlesex, and his wife, Jane Coleman (d. 1811). She was probably named after her maternal grandmother, Jane Seymour, elder sister of Edward Seymour, 8th Duke of Somerset. They were younger children of Sir Edward Seymour, 5th Baronet, who was a direct descendant of Edward Seymour, 1st Duke of Somerset (c.1500–1552), the eldest brother of Jane Seymour, the third wife of King Henry VIII.

Her father and two of her sisters died when she was five, and she and her surviving sister were then brought up by their mother, who married in 1770 Edwin Lascelles, 1st Baron Harewood, a rich sexagenarian whose wealth derived from sugar plantations in the West Indies. Her elder sister, Jane Stanhope, Countess of Harrington, was noted for being an "epitome of virtue".

== Marriage to Worsley ==
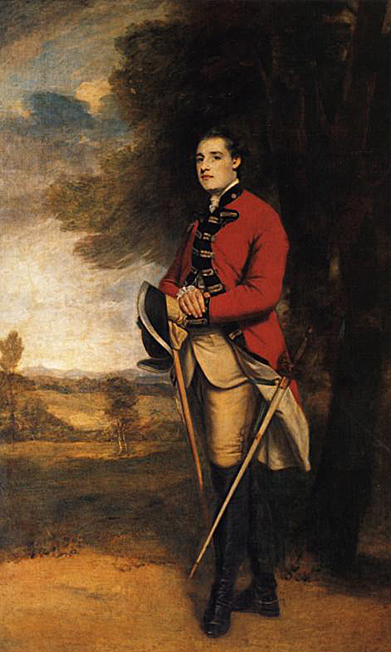
The counterpart (or pendant) painting of her husband Sir Richard Worsley, 7th Baronet

On 20 September 1775, at the age of 17, Seymour Fleming married Sir Richard Worsley, 7th Baronet of Appuldurcombe House, Isle of Wight, and was styled Lady Worsley until his death. She was rumoured to have been worth £70,000 upon her marriage, but in truth brought £52,000 to the union (equivalent to £7,262,800 in 2025).

The couple were badly suited to each other, and the marriage began to fall apart shortly after it began. In 1776, they had one child, a son named Robert Edwin who died young. In August 1781 Seymour bore a second child, Jane Seymour Worsley, fathered by Maurice George Bisset but claimed by Worsley as his own to avoid scandal. Bisset, a captain in the South Hampshire militia, had been Worsley's close friend and neighbour at Knighton Gorges on the Isle of Wight.

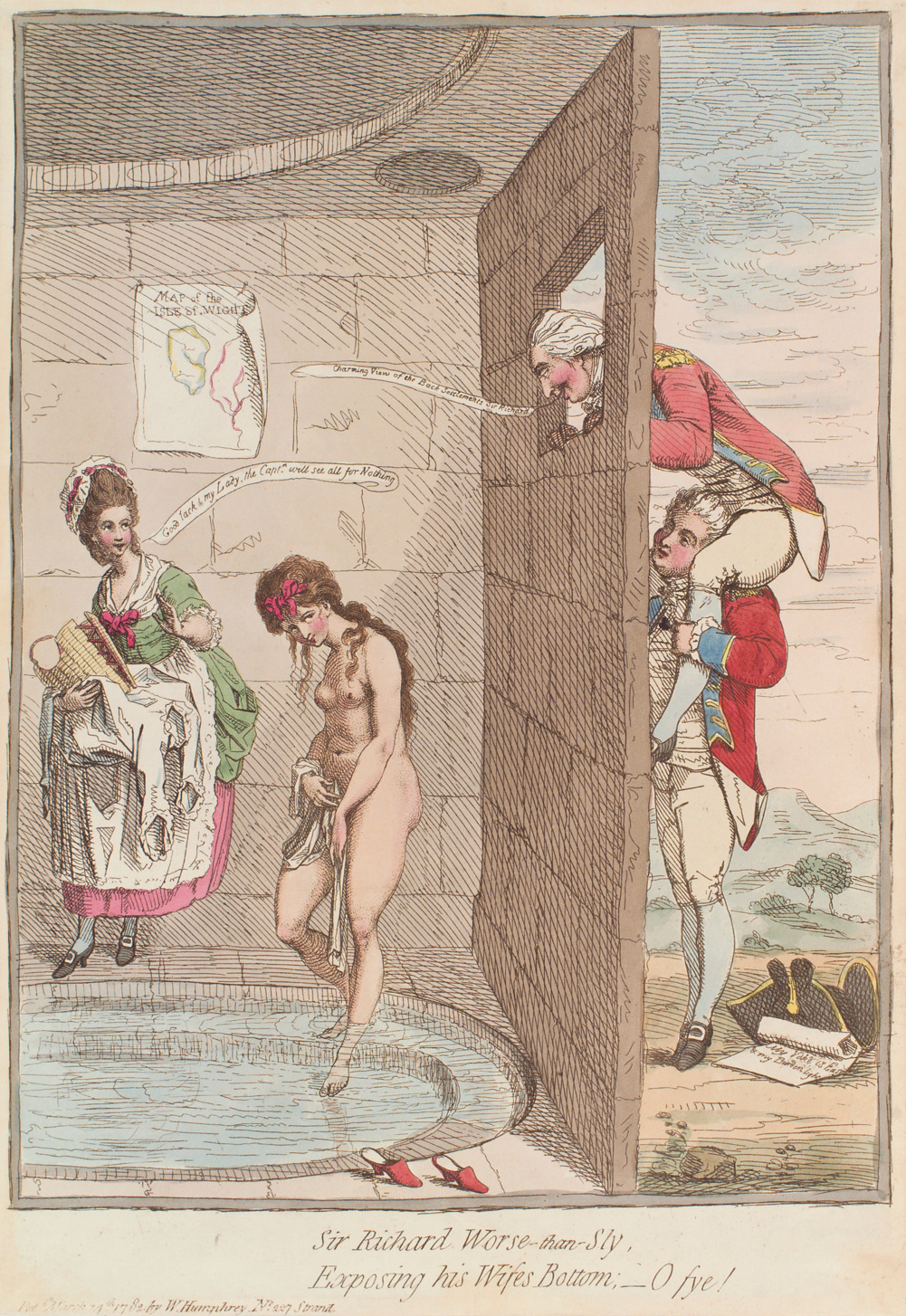
Cartoon by James Gillray: "Sir Richard Worse-than-sly, exposing his wife's bottom; – o fye!"

Lady Worsley was rumoured to have had 27 lovers. In November 1781 she ran off with Bisset, and in February 1782 Worsley brought a criminal conversation case against Bisset for £20,000 (equivalent to £2,918,500 in 2025). Lady Worsley turned the suit in her favour with scandalous revelations and the aid of past and present lovers; and questioned the legal status of her husband. She included a number of testimonies from her lovers and her doctor, William Osborn, who related that she had suffered from a venereal disease which she had contracted from the Marquess of Graham. It was alleged that Worsley had displayed his wife naked to Bisset at the bath house in Maidstone. This testimony destroyed Worsley's suit and the jury awarded him only one shilling (2015: £5.28) in damages.

Bisset eventually left Lady Worsley when it became apparent that Worsley was seeking separation rather than divorce, meaning Seymour could not remarry until Worsley's death. Seymour was forced to become a professional mistress or demimondaine and live off the donations of rich men in order to survive, joining other upper-class women in a similar position in the New Female Coterie. She had two more children: another by Bisset after he left her in 1783, whose fate is unknown; and a fourth, Charlotte Dorothy Hammond (née Cochard), who she sent to be raised by a family in the Ardennes.

Lady Worsley later left for Paris in order to avoid her debts. In 1788, she and her new lover, the biracial composer, conductor and champion fencer Joseph Bologne, the Chevalier de Saint-Georges, returned to England, and her estranged husband entered into articles of separation, on the condition she spend four years in exile in France. Eight months before the expiration of this exile, she was unable to leave France because of the events of the French Revolution and she was probably imprisoned during the Reign of Terror, meaning she was abroad on the death of her and Worsley's son in 1795. In early 1797, she returned to England, and she then suffered a severe two-month illness. Owing to the forgiveness of her mother, her sister and her sister's husband, the Earl of Harrington, she was then able to move into Brompton Park, her previous home, but which the laws on property prevented her from officially holding.

== Later life ==
On Worsley's death in 1805, her £70,000 jointure reverted to her and just over a month later, on 12 September, at the age of 47 she married 26-year-old newfound lover John Lewis Cuchet (d. 1836) at Farnham. Also that month, by royal licence, she officially resumed her maiden name of Fleming, and her new husband also took it. After the armistice of 1814 ended the War of the Sixth Coalition, the couple moved to a villa at Passy, Paris where she died in 1818, aged 59. She is buried at the Père Lachaise Cemetery in Paris.

== In popular culture ==
In the 2015 BBC2 television film, The Scandalous Lady W, based upon Hallie Rubenhold's book Lady Worsley's Whim, she was played by Natalie Dormer.

== Bibliography ==
- Lysons, Daniel (1795). "Kensington". The Environs of London: Volume 3, County of Middlesex. London: T Cadell and W Davies. pp. 170–230.
- Rubenhold, Hallie (2011). Lady Worsley's Whim. London: Random House. ISBN 9781446449691.
- Sheppard, F H W, ed. (1975). "Estates and houses before 1851: The Harrington-Villars Estate". Survey of London: Volume 38, South Kensington Museums Area. University of London for the London County Council. pp. 3–8.
- Walker, Dave (7 August 2014). "Down Brompton Lane: more houses and stories". The Library Time Machine.
