= Stanhope (name) =

Stanhope is an English surname of medieval origins, meaning 'a dweller on a stony ridge'. It has also been used as a given name.

== List ==
Notable people with the name include:

=== Surname ===
- Alexander Stanhope (1638–1707), English envoy in Madrid
- Arthur Stanhope (1627–1694), English politician who sat in the House of Commons
- Arthur Stanhope, 6th Earl Stanhope (1838–1905), British Conservative Party politician
- Charles Stanhope (disambiguation), multiple people
- Doug Stanhope (born 1967), American stand-up comedian
- Edward Stanhope (1840–1893), British Conservative Party politician
- Elizabeth Stanhope (disambiguation), multiple people
- Ferdinando Stanhope (died 1643), English politician who sat in the House of Commons
- George Stanhope (1660–1728), clergyman of the Church of England
- George Stanhope (disambiguation), multiple people
- Henry Stanhope (disambiguation), multiple people
- Lady Hester Stanhope (1776–1839), British socialite, adventurer and traveler
- James Stanhope (disambiguation), multiple people
- John Stanhope (disambiguation), multiple people
- Jon Stanhope (born 1951), Australian politician
- Leicester Stanhope, 5th Earl of Harrington (1784–1862), English peer and soldier
- Louisa Stanhope (fl. 1806–1827), English novelist
- Katherine Stanhope, Countess of Chesterfield (1609–1667), English governess and Postmaster General
- Mark Stanhope (born 1952), British Royal Navy officer
- Michael Stanhope (disambiguation), multiple people
- Philip Stanhope (disambiguation), multiple people
- Richard Stanhope (born 1957), British Olympic rower
- Rosamund Stanhope (1919–2005), British poet and teacher
- Sydney Stanhope, 6th Earl of Harrington (1845–1866), English peer
- Thomas Stanhope (1540–1596), English Member of Parliament for Nottinghamshire
- Will Stanhope (1986–2026), Canadian rock climber and professional rock guide
- William Stanhope (disambiguation), multiple people
- Stanhope (Middlesex cricketer), cricketer from 1787 to 1798

=== Given name ===
- Stanhope Aspinwall (1713–1771), British diplomat
- Stanhope Forbes (1857–1947), Irish-British artist and founder of a school of painters
- Stanhope Wood Nixon (1894–1958), vice president of Nixon Nitration Works during the company's 1924 disaster

== See also ==
- Earl of Chesterfield, hereditary title created in 1628
- Earl Stanhope, hereditary title held by seven people since 1718
- Baron Stanhope, hereditary title created in 1605
- Spencer-Stanhope family, family of British landed gentry
- Scudamore-Stanhope, surname
