= Countess of Chesterfield =

Countess of Chesterfield (indicating the wife of the Earl of Chesterfield) may refer to:

- Catherine Stanhope, Countess of Chesterfield (d. 1636), first wife of Philip Stanhope, 1st Earl of Chesterfield.
- Anne Stanhope, Countess of Chesterfield (d. 1667), second wife of Philip Stanhope, 1st Earl of Chesterfield.
- Elizabeth Stanhope, Countess of Chesterfield (d. 1665), second wife of Philip Stanhope, 2nd Earl of Chesterfield.
- Elizabeth Stanhope, Countess of Chesterfield (d. 1677), third wife of Philip Stanhope, 2nd Earl of Chesterfield.
- Elizabeth Stanhope, Countess of Chesterfield (d. 1708), wife of Philip Stanhope, 3rd Earl of Chesterfield.
- Melusina von der Schulenburg, Countess of Walsingham and Chesterfield, wife of Philip Stanhope, 4th Earl of Chesterfield.
- Anne Stanhope (Anne Thistlethwaite), Countess of Chesterfield (1759–1798), first wife of Philip Stanhope, 5th Earl of Chesterfield.
- Henrietta Stanhope, Countess of Chesterfield, second wife of Philip Stanhope, 5th Earl of Chesterfield.
- Anne Stanhope, Countess of Chesterfield (1802–1885), wife of George Stanhope, 6th Earl of Chesterfield.
- Dorothea Scudamore-Stanhope, Countess of Chesterfield, wife of Henry Edwyn Chandos Scudamore-Stanhope, 9th Earl of Chesterfield.
- Enid Scudamore-Stanhope, Countess of Chesterfield, wife of Edwyn Francis Scudamore-Stanhope, 10th Earl of Chesterfield.
- Angela Scudamore-Stanhope, Countess of Chesterfield, second wife of Edward Henry Scudamore-Stanhope, 12th Earl of Chesterfield.

The title was also held suo jure by Katherine Stanhope, Countess of Chesterfield (d. 1667), widow of Henry Stanhope, Lord Stanhope, who in 1660 was created Countess of Chesterfield for life.

== See also ==
- Earl of Chesterfield
