= Scudamore =

Scudamore is a surname. Notable people with the surname include:

- Barnabas Scudamore (1609–1651), English soldier who commanded Royalist troops in the English Civil War
- Berkeley Lionel Scudamore Dallard (1889–1983), New Zealand accountant, senior public servant and prison administrator
- Brian Scudamore, of 1-800-GOT-JUNK?, a junk removal company with franchises in Canada, the United States and Australia
- Charles FitzRoy-Scudamore (1713–1782), British politician
- Claude Scudamore Jarvis CMG OBE (1879–1953), British colonial governor, Arabist and naturalist noted for his rapport with the desert Bedouin
- Dave Scudamore, the 1997 US Marathon champion
- Edward Scudamore-Stanhope, 12th Earl of Chesterfield (1889–1952), son of Henry Edwyn Chandos Scudamore-Stanhope, 9th Earl of Chesterfield
- Edwyn Scudamore-Stanhope, 10th Earl of Chesterfield KG, GCVO, PC (1854–1933), styled Lord Stanhope between 1883 and 1887, a British peer and courtier
- Enid Scudamore-Stanhope, Countess of Chesterfield, born 10 September 1878 at Marske Hall in Yorkshire, died 30 November 1957
- Francis (Frank) Scudamore (1859-1939), well known war correspondent with The Times, The Daily News (UK)
- Frank Ives Scudamore, (1823–1884) Receiver and accountant general of the British Post Office, responsible for the Post Office acquiring the telegraph system
- Henry Scudamore, 3rd Duke of Beaufort (1707–1745), the elder son of Henry Somerset, 2nd Duke of Beaufort and his second wife, Rachel Noel
- Henry Scudamore-Stanhope, 11th Earl of Chesterfield (1855–1935), the second son of Henry Edwyn Chandos Scudamore-Stanhope, 9th Earl of Chesterfield
- Henry Scudamore-Stanhope, 9th Earl of Chesterfield, DL, JP, (1821–1887), the first son of four of Sir Edwyn Francis Scudamore-Stanhope, 2nd Baronet
- James Scudamore (courtier) (also spelled Skidmore, Skidmur or Skidmuer) (1568–1619), gentleman usher at the court of Queen Elizabeth I
- James Scudamore (1624–1668) (1624–1668), English politician
- James Scudamore, 3rd Viscount Scudamore (1684–1716), English politician
- James Scudamore (author) (born 1976), author
- James Scudamore (veterinarian), the Chief Veterinary Officer (CVO) of the United Kingdom from April 1997 until he retired March 2004
- John Scudamore, 1st Viscount Scudamore (1601–1671), English diplomat and politician who sat in the House of Commons at various times between 1621 and 1629
- John Scudamore (courtier), (1542–1623), the eldest son of William Scudamore
- John Scudamore (landowner), 15th century English landowner from Herefordshire
- Margaret Scudamore (1884–1958), English actress who began in ingenue roles
- Mary Scudamore (née Shelton) (1550–1603), courtier and the daughter of Sir John Shelton of Shelton Hall, Norfolk
- Michael Scudamore Redgrave, CBE (1908–1985), English stage and film actor, director, manager and author
- Peter Scudamore (born 1958), known universally as 'Scu', a former jockey and trainer in National Hunt racing
- Richard Scudamore, currently Chief Executive of the F.A. Premier League, a position he has held since November 1999
- Tom Scudamore (born 1982), third-generation British flat and steeplechase jockey
- Viscount Scudamore, title in the Peerage of Ireland

== See also ==
- Fifield Scudamore, also known as Fifield Bavant, a very small village and former civil parish in Wiltshire, England
- Upton Scudamore, village in Wiltshire, England, located about a mile north of the town of Warminster
- Cudmore (disambiguation)
- Scott damore
