= Scudamore-Stanhope =

Scudamore-Stanhope is a surname. Notable people with the surname include:

- Edward Scudamore-Stanhope, 12th Earl of Chesterfield (1889–1952), the only son of The Honorable Evelyn Theodore Scudamore-Stanhope
- Edwyn Scudamore-Stanhope, 10th Earl of Chesterfield Bt KG GCVO PC (1854–1933), styled Lord Stanhope between 1883 and 1887, British peer and courtier
- Enid Scudamore-Stanhope, Countess of Chesterfield (1878–1957), British heiress and racehorse breeder
- Henry Scudamore-Stanhope, 11th Earl of Chesterfield (1855–1935), the second son of Henry Edwyn Chandos Scudamore-Stanhope
- Henry Scudamore-Stanhope, 9th Earl of Chesterfield, Bt DL JP (1821–1887), the first son of four of Sir Edwyn Francis Scudamore-Stanhope
- Berkeley Scudamore-Stanhope MA, Archdeacon of Hereford from 1887 to 1910
