= Henry Scudamore-Stanhope =

Henry Scudamore-Stanhope may refer to:

- Henry Scudamore-Stanhope, 9th Earl of Chesterfield (1821–1887), English nobleman
- Henry Scudamore-Stanhope, 11th Earl of Chesterfield (1855–1935), English nobleman

== See also ==
- Henry Scudamore, 3rd Duke of Beaufort
- Henry Stanhope (disambiguation)
