= Stanhope =

Stanhope may refer to:

== In arts and entertainment ==
- Stanhope essay prize, at Oxford University
- Stanhope College, a fictional college attended by Supergirl
- Captain Stanhope, a character in R.C. Sherriff's Journey's End

== People ==
- Stanhope (name), a surname and given name
- Earl Stanhope, a hereditary title held by seven people since 1718
- Spencer-Stanhope family, a family of British landed gentry
- Earl of Harrington, a title in the Peerage of Great Britain

== Places ==
=== Australia ===
- Stanhope, Victoria, Australia
- Stanhope Gardens, New South Wales, Australia

=== Canada ===
- Stanhope, Prince Edward Island, Canada
- Stanhope, Quebec, Canada
- Stanhope, Newfoundland and Labrador, Canada

=== UK ===
- Stanhope, County Durham, England
- Stanhope, Kent, England
- Stanhope, Peeblesshire, Scotland

=== United States ===
- Stanhope, Iowa
- Stanhope, Kentucky
- Stanhope, New Jersey
- Stanhope, Ohio
- Stanhope, a Mississippi landmark
- Stanhope Hotel, in New York City

== In transportation ==
- Stanhope (carriage), any of several carriage designs by Hon. Fitzroy Stanhope
- Stanhope (railways), third class passenger vehicles on early British railways
- Stanhope body, a car body style
  - Stanhope, an automobile manufactured from 1904 to 1906 by the Twyford Motor Car Company

== Other uses ==
- Stanhope (optical bijou), a type of photographic lens used in novelty collectibles
- Stanhopea, a genus of the orchid family
- Stanhope plc, English property developer
- Stanhope press, an early cast iron printing press
- First Stanhope–Sunderland Ministry, in British history
- Second Stanhope–Sunderland Ministry, in British history

== See also ==
- Stanhope Gardens (disambiguation)
