= Philip Stanhope =

Philip Stanhope may refer to:

- Philip Stanhope (Royalist officer) (died 1645), English Civil War Royalist colonel
- Philip Stanhope, 1st Earl of Chesterfield (1584–1656), English peer
- Philip Stanhope, 2nd Earl of Chesterfield (1634–1714), English peer, grandson of the 1st Earl
- Philip Stanhope, 3rd Earl of Chesterfield (1673–1726), English peer, son of the 2nd Earl
- Philip Stanhope, 4th Earl of Chesterfield (1694–1773), English peer, son of the 3rd Earl
- Philip Stanhope (diplomat) (1732–1768), illegitimate son of the 4th Earl of Chesterfield and recipient of his Letters
- Philip Stanhope, 5th Earl of Chesterfield (1755–1815), British Ambassador to Spain, 1784–1786, and Master of the Mint, 1789–1790, adopted son of the 4th Earl
- Philip Stanhope, 2nd Earl Stanhope (1714–1786), son of the 1st Earl
- Philip Henry Stanhope, 4th Earl Stanhope (1781–1855), English politician
- Philip Stanhope, 5th Earl Stanhope (1805–1875), English historian, son of the 4th Earl
- Philip Stanhope, 1st Baron Weardale (1847–1923), British Liberal politician
