= John Gerald Potter =

English wallpaper manufacturer and art patron (1829–1908)

John Gerald Potter (1829–1908) was an English wallpaper manufacturer, known also as a patron of James McNeill Whistler.

== Background ==
The printing of calico was introduced to Darwen in Lancashire by James Greenway, in 1776. John Potter (1773–1838), a Manchester merchant, married his daughter Sarah, and had a family of four sons and five daughters, of whom two died young. The sons included Charles Potter (1802–1872) and his brothers Alfred (born 1804), Harold (born 1806), and Edwin (born 1810). Of the daughters, Sarah Jane (born 1799) married the Hon. Anthony Oliver Molesworth of the Royal Artillery, and Julia (born 1817) married Nathaniel James Merriman and was mother of John X. Merriman.

James Greenway set up the Dob Meadow Print Works for calico in 1808. He was joined in the business by John Potter, and William Maude, another son-in-law. Charles Potter, John's son, came to work there in the 1820s. In 1831, however, John Potter and William Maude were bankrupted. Charles Potter and William Ross, in 1832, set up a new partnership, Potter & Ross, printing calico.

Potter & Co., wallpaper manufacturer in Darwen, was founded by Charles Potter, Harold Potter and Edwin Potter in 1840, spun out of the calico printers Potter & Ross. The new business depended on Patent No. 8302 of 1839, obtained by Harold Potter, adapting a calico printing technique to wallpaper.

Edmund Potter, another calico printer, was a nephew of John Potter (1773–1838), the son of his brother James. There was therefore a family connection between the wallpaper Potters and Beatrix Potter, granddaughter of Edmund Potter. She showed she was aware of it, in a letter about a frieze of some of her characters.

== Life ==
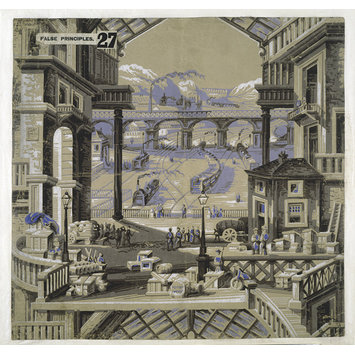
Wallpaper section from 1853 by Potters of Darwen

John Gerald Potter was the only son of Charles Potter (1802–1872) and his wife Grace Gordon, born at Dinting, Derbyshire in July 1829. He became a partner in Potter & Co., wallpaper manufacturers, in 1849.

In 1854, with Robert Mills, Potter took out a patent for carpet manufacture improvements. A family partnership, "The Darwen Carpet Company", was dissolved in 1858. In 1862 Potter gave evidence to the Children's Employment Commission. In 1864 he replaced his father as senior partner of the wallpaper firm.

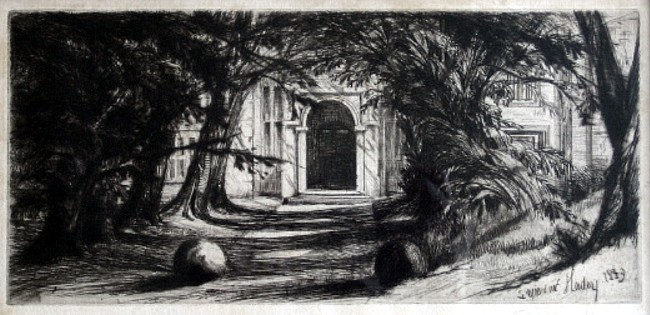
Mytton Hall, 1859 etching

Having lived in Earnsdale, Potter came to live at Mytton Hall, in Whalley. The connection with Whistler came through his brother-in-law George Chapman, a minor artist and school friend of Whistler. Potter was the first owner of Symphony in White, No. 2: The Little White Girl, an 1864 picture by Whistler. He also came to own Nocturne: Blue and Silver – Cremorne Lights of 1872, now in the Tate collection; and other paintings. In the 1890s Whistler took offence when Potter resold The Little White Girl for a profit.

Three times an unsuccessful Liberal Party candidate for Blackburn, Potter contested the constituency first in 1865. According to the diary of Charles Tiplady, he was encouraged to do so by Ernest King, who owned the Blackburn Times. He stood again in 1868. In the resulting 1869 by-election, he stood with John Morley. He stood for a last time in 1885, for Darwen, when he had the support of Edward Stanley, 15th Earl of Derby, who had left the Conservatives to become a Liberal.

From 1884 Potter lived in London. In 1885 he was a director of the Omaha Cattle Company. In later life, he lived on the continent of Europe.

== Family ==
Potter married in 1851 Eliza Adelaide Chapman, daughter of James Chapman, R.N.. They had three sons and three daughters; John Charles Potter (1854–1920) was the eldest son. The eldest daughter Grace married in 1878 James Mellor. The youngest daughter, Julia Dasha, married Evelyn Scudamore, son of Henry Scudamore-Stanhope, 9th Earl of Chesterfield, and was mother of Edward Scudamore-Stanhope, 12th Earl of Chesterfield.

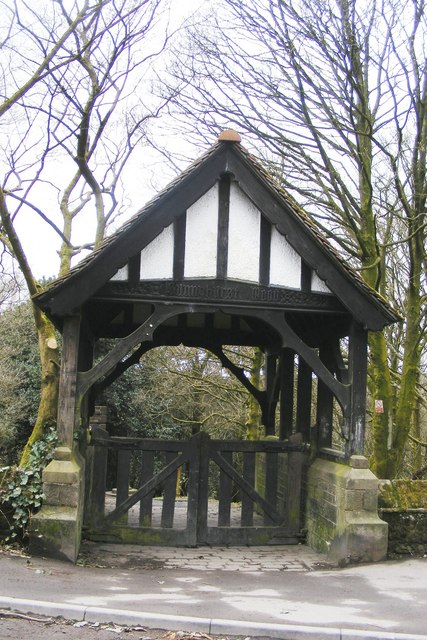
Lych-gate at the entrance to Sunnyhurst Woods, memorial to Charles and John Gerald Potter, given by John Charles Potter

During the Lancashire Cotton Famine years 1862–3, Eliza Potter was an organiser of "mothers' kitchens" in Blackburn, providing meals for nursing mothers. She also set up an orphanage.
