= George Stanhope (disambiguation) =

George Stanhope (1660–1728) was a Church of England clergyman.

George Stanhope may also refer to:

- George Stanhope, 6th Earl of Chesterfield (1805–1866), British Tory politician, courtier and race horse owner
- George Stanhope, 7th Earl of Chesterfield (1831–1871), British soldier and Conservative politician
- George Stanhope, 8th Earl of Chesterfield (1822–1883)
