= Letter to Chesterfield =

1755 letter from Samuel Johnson

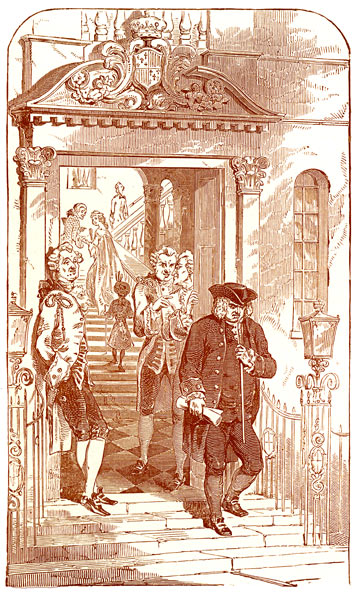
Illustration of Dr Johnson leaving Lord Chesterfield's residence.

On 7 February 1755, Samuel Johnson sent a letter to Lord Chesterfield in response to what some believed to be Chesterfield's opportunistic endorsement of his A Dictionary of the English Language. Although Chesterfield was patron of the Proposal for the Dictionary, he made no moves to further the progress of the Dictionary until seven years after his original investment into the project. Suddenly, Chesterfield wrote two "puff" pieces to promote the Dictionary, which prompted Johnson to write a letter accusing Chesterfield of only providing help when it was least needed.

Some claim that the letter caused a minor furore in the contemporary literary world when Johnson made it public and it has been the subject of critical comment ever since; it has been described as literature's "declaration of independence". However, Chesterfield's reaction to the letter was quite different, and he praised Johnson's intellect and ability to write after reading it for the first time. Johnson could not believe that Chesterfield would ever react favourably towards the letter, and it was not until years later that Chesterfield and Johnson would finally reconcile.

== Background ==
Johnson began work on his Dictionary in 1746 and although the consortium of booksellers that commissioned the work provided him with £1,575 as expenses, Johnson also sought subscriptions from literary patrons among the aristocracy. One of those to receive a request for patronage was Lord Chesterfield, a noted patron of the arts. Johnson visited Chesterfield but, according to Johnson's account, he was kept waiting for a long time and was treated dismissively by Chesterfield when they eventually met. Chesterfield sent Johnson £10 but offered no greater support to Johnson through the seven further years it took him to compile the Dictionary. A degree of genteel mutual antipathy thereafter existed between the two men, Chesterfield regarding Johnson as a "respectable Hottentot, who throws his meat anywhere but down his throat" and as "uncouth in manners". Johnson, in turn, was disparaging of both Chesterfield's nobility and his intellect: "This man, I thought, had been a Lord among wits; but I find he is only a wit among Lords."

== Letter ==
After seven years from first meeting Johnson to go over the work, Chesterfield wrote two anonymous essays in The World that recommended the Dictionary. He complained that the English language was lacking structure and argued:

We must have recourse to the old Roman expedient in times of confusion, and choose a dictator. Upon this principle, I give my vote for Mr Johnson to fill that great and arduous post.

However, Johnson did not appreciate the tone of the essay, and he felt that Chesterfield did not complete his job as the work's patron. In a letter, Johnson explained his feelings about the matter:

Seven years, my lord, have now past since I waited in your outward rooms or was repulsed from your door, during which time I have been pushing on my work through difficulties of which it is useless to complain, and have brought it at last to the verge of publication without one act of assistance, one word of encouragement, or one smile of favour. Such treatment I did not expect, for I never had a patron before. . . . Is not a patron, my lord, one who looks with unconcern on a man struggling for life in the water, and when he has reached ground, encumbers him with help? The notice which you have been pleased to take of my labours, had it been early, had been kind: but it has been delayed till I am indifferent and cannot enjoy it; till I am solitary and cannot impart it; till I am known and do not want it.

Chesterfield was not offended by the letter, but instead impressed by the language. After receiving it, he displayed it on a table for visitors to read, and, according to Robert Dodsley, said "This man has great powers" and then he "pointed out the severest passages, and observed how well they were expressed." William Adams told Johnson what was said, and Johnson responded, "That is not Lord Chesterfield; he is the proudest man this day", to which Adams responded, "No, there is one person at least as proud; I think, by your own account, you are the prouder man of the two." Johnson, finishing, said, "But mine, was defensive pride." Years later, the two reconciled, and a letter from Chesterfield "melted the Heart of the Writer of that epistolary Philippic."

== Critical commentary ==
The letter has continued to be commented on by some of the most noted critics and authors since its publication to the present day. In 1853, Thomas Carlyle, in an early biographical essay on Johnson proclaimed its significance:

Listen, once again, to that far-famed Blast of Doom, proclaiming into the ear of Lord Chesterfield, and, through him, of the listening world, that patronage should be no more!

In the twentieth century, Alvin Kernan wrote that the letter

...still stands as the Magna Carta of the modern author, the public announcement that the days of courtly letters were at last ended, that the author was the true source of his work and that he and it were no longer dependent on patron or the social system he represented.

However, to think that the letter was written out of anger or a response to neglect would be wrong. Instead, they claim that Johnson was forced into a fake status "of a man who was soon to declare, in a Preface perhaps already written, that his great work had been written, without the 'patronage of the great." In essence, an outsider would think that Chesterfield was patronising the work continually.
