= Elizabeth Stanhope =

Elizabeth Stanhope may refer to:

- Elizabeth Stanhope, Countess of Chesterfield (1640–1665), second wife of Philip Stanhope, 2nd Earl of Chesterfield
- Elizabeth Lyon, Countess of Strathmore (1663–1723), daughter of above
- Elizabeth Stanhope, Countess of Chesterfield (d. 1677), third wife of Philip Stanhope, 2nd Earl of Chesterfield
- Elizabeth Stanhope, Countess of Chesterfield (d. 1708), wife of Philip Stanhope, 3rd Earl of Chesterfield
