= Sun Castle =

British-bred Thoroughbred racehorse

- Sire: Hyperion
- Grandsire: Gainsborough
- Dam: Castle Gay
- Damsire: Buchan
- Sex: Stallion
- Foaled: 1938
- Country: United Kingdom
- Colour: Bay
- Breeder: Enid Scudamore-Stanhope, Countess of Chesterfield
- Owner: Wyndham Portal, 1st Viscount Portal
- Trainer: Cecil Boyd-Rochfort
- Record: 6:2-0-1 (incomplete)

Major wins
- New St Leger (1941)

Sun Castle (1938 – March 1942) was a British Thoroughbred racehorse who raced during World War II and was best known for winning the classic St Leger in 1941. After showing promise as a two-year-old he finished third in the 2000 Guineas the following spring but ran poorly when strongly-fancied for the New Derby. He won a race at Newbury in August before taking the substitute New St Leger at Manchester Racecourse. He died in the following spring after contacting tetanus.

== Background ==
Sun Castle was a good-looking bay horse bred at Beningbrough Hall stud in Yorkshire by Enid Scudamore-Stanhope, Countess of Chesterfield. He was sired by Hyperion, who won The Derby and the St Leger Stakes in 1933 and went on to become an internationally significant sire: Sun Castle's successes enabled Hyperion to claim the second of his six sires' championships in 1945. Sun Castle's dam, Castle Gay, was a moderate racehorse, winning one minor race, but was a half-sister of the Eclipse Stakes winner Loaningdale.

Sun Castle was scheduled to be sold at as a yearling at Doncaster in 1939 but was withdrawn from the sale when Wyndham Portal, 1st Viscount Portal bought a half share in the horse. Lord Portal, who owned Sun Castle throughout his racing career sent the colt to be trained at the Freemason Lodge stable in Newmarket, Suffolk by Cecil Boyd-Rochfort.

Sun Castle's racing career took place during World War II during which horse racing in Britain was subject to many restrictions. Several major racecourses, including Epsom and Doncaster, were closed for the duration of the conflict, either for safety reasons, or because they were being used by the military. Many important races were rescheduled to new dates and venues, often at short notice, and all five of the Classics were usually run at Newmarket. Wartime austerity also meant that prize money was reduced: Sun Castle's St Leger was worth £3,550 compared to the £10,465 earned by Scottish Union in 1939.

== Racing career ==
Sun Castle failed to win in two races as a two-year-old but showed promising form in defeat and was rated the fourth-best juvenile of the year in the Free Handicap.

On 30 April 1941, Sun Castle contested the 133rd running of the 2000 Guineas which was run over the July course at Newmarket rather than its traditional home on the Rowley Mile. He started at odds of 14/1 and finished third of the nineteen runners, beaten two lengths and one and a half lengths by Lambert Simnel and Morogoro. with the favourite Owen Tudor in fifth.

In the New Derby, run over one and a half miles at the same course on 18 June, Sun Castle started joint-second favourite behind Lambert Simnel in a twenty-runner field. He never looked likely to win and finished sixteenth behind Owen Tudor. At the end of August, Sun Castle won the St Simon Stakes (not the current race of the same name) at Newbury Racecourse, beating Devonian and Masarin.

Doncaster Racecourse, the traditional home of the St Leger was unavailable for racing in 1941 and a substitute "New St Leger" was run over one mile six furlongs at Manchester Racecourse in September. Ridden by Georges Bridgland, Sun Castle started at odds of 10/1 in a field of sixteen runners which also included Owen Tudor, Lambert Simnel and the 1000 Guineas winner Dancing Time. Sun Castle won by a head from Chateau Larose with Dancing Time a length away in third place. At the end of the year, he was rated the second-best three-year-old in Britain, four pounds behind Owen Tudor.

It was intended that Sun Castle would be kept in training in 1942 with the major staying races as his objectives. In March 1942, however he was destroyed after contracting tetanus as a result of a foot injury.

== Assessment ==
In their book A Century of Champions, based on a modified version of the Timeform system, John Randall and Tony Morris rated Sun Castle an "average" winner of the St Leger.

== Pedigree ==
Pedigree of Sun Castle (GB), bay colt, 1938
Sire Hyperion (GB) 1930	Gainsborough; 1915	Bayardo	Bay Ronald
Sire Hyperion (GB) 1930	Gainsborough; 1915	Bayardo	Galicia
Sire Hyperion (GB) 1930	Gainsborough; 1915	Rosedrop	St Frusquin*
Sire Hyperion (GB) 1930	Gainsborough; 1915	Rosedrop	Rosaline
Sire Hyperion (GB) 1930	Selene (GB); 1919	Chaucer	St Simon*
Sire Hyperion (GB) 1930	Selene (GB); 1919	Chaucer	Canterbury Pilgrim
Sire Hyperion (GB) 1930	Selene (GB); 1919	Serenissima	Minoru
Sire Hyperion (GB) 1930	Selene (GB); 1919	Serenissima	Gondolette
Dam Castle Gay (GB) 1928	Buchan (GB); 1916	Sunstar	Sundridge
Dam Castle Gay (GB) 1928	Buchan (GB); 1916	Sunstar	Doris
Dam Castle Gay (GB) 1928	Buchan (GB); 1916	Hamoaze	Torpoint
Dam Castle Gay (GB) 1928	Buchan (GB); 1916	Hamoaze	Maid of the Mist
Dam Castle Gay (GB) 1928	Perfection (GB); 1918	Orby	Orme
Dam Castle Gay (GB) 1928	Perfection (GB); 1918	Orby	Rhoda B.
Dam Castle Gay (GB) 1928	Perfection (GB); 1918	Zenith	Lesterlin
Dam Castle Gay (GB) 1928	Perfection (GB); 1918	Zenith	Stella (Family 22-a)

* Sun Castle is inbred 5S x 4S to the stallion St Simon, meaning that he appears fifth generation (via St Frusquin) and fourth generation on the sire side of his pedigree.
