= Cudmore =

Cudmore may refer to:

== People ==
- Alexander Cudmore (1888–1944), American soccer player
- Arthur Cudmore (1870–1951), Australian surgeon and professor
- Collier Cudmore (1885–1971), Australian lawyer, politician and Olympic rower
- Daniel Cudmore (born 1981), Canadian actor
- Daniel Cudmore (businessman) (1811–1891), early settler in South Australia
- Harold Cudmore (born 1944), Irish sailor
- Jamie Cudmore (born 1978), Canadian former rugby union player
- Richard Cudmore (1787–1840), English violinist

== Other uses ==
- Cudmore National Park, Queensland, Australia
- Cudmore Creek, Ontario, Canada
