= William Stanhope =

William Stanhope may refer to:

- William Stanhope (1626–1703), MP for Nottingham
- William Stanhope, 1st Earl of Harrington (c. 1690–1756), British statesman and diplomat
- William Stanhope, 2nd Earl of Harrington (1719–1779), English politician, soldier and nobleman
- William Stanhope, 11th Earl of Harrington (1922–2009), British captain and peer
- William Stanhope (1702–1772), British Member of Parliament for Buckinghamshire and Lostwithiel

== See also ==
- Will Stanhope (1986–2026), Canadian rock climber and professional rock guide
