= John Stanhope =

John Stanhope may refer to:

- John Stanhope, 1st Baron Stanhope (1545?–1621), English courtier and politician
- Sir John Stanhope (1559–1611), English landowner
- John Stanhope (MP) (1705–1748), British politician
- John Stanhope Collings-Wells (1880–1918), British recipient of the Victoria Cross
- John Spencer Stanhope (1787–1873), English landowner and antiquarian
- John Roddam Spencer Stanhope (1829–1908), English artist, son of John Spencer Stanhope
- Rear Admiral John Stanhope (1744–1800) Royal Navy commander
- Jon Stanhope (born 1951), Australian politician
