= Henry Stanhope =

Henry Stanhope may refer to:

- Henry Stanhope, Lord Stanhope (died 1634), English nobleman and politician
- Henry Edwyn Stanhope (1754–1814), Royal Navy officer

== See also ==
- Henry Scudamore-Stanhope (disambiguation)
