= George Stanhope, 8th Earl of Chesterfield =

George Philip Stanhope (29 November 1822 – 19 October 1883) was the 8th Earl of Chesterfield, succeeding to the title on the death of his third cousin, the 7th Earl, in 1871.

He was the son of George Charles Stanhope and Jane Galbraith. Stanhope married, firstly, Marianne Roche, daughter of William Roche, on 8 April 1856. Secondly, he married Catherine Jane Jarvis Bond, daughter of John Hildebrand Bond, on 7 March 1877. Thirdly, he married Agnes Payne, daughter of James Payne, on 7 December 1882.

In 1841 George Philip Stanhope, 8th Earl of Chesterfield gained the rank of ensign in the 29th (Worcestershire) Regiment of Foot and was promoted lieutenant in April 1842. He succeeded to the title of 8th Earl of Chesterfield on 7 July 1873. He lived at Rockwood, Strabane, County Tyrone, Ireland. His only child was Philip Laurence John Stanhope (8 December 1857 – 1 September 1860).

George Stanhope, 8th Earl of Chesterfield, died on 19 October 1883, aged 60, at Killendarragh, Lifford, County Donegal, Ireland, without surviving issue. His will was probated on 22 March 1884 at Derry, County Londonderry, Ireland, at under £4,500. He was succeeded to the title Earl of Chesterfield by Henry Scudamore-Stanhope, his fourth cousin once removed.

Peerage of England
Preceded by George Philip Cecil Arthur Stanhope	Earl of Chesterfield; 1871–1883	Succeeded by Henry Edwyn Chandos Scudamore-Stanhope
