= Earl of Chesterfield =

Title in the Peerage of England

- Arms of Stanhope: Quarterly, ermine and gules
- Creation date: 4 August 1628
- Created by: Charles I
- Peerage: Peerage of England
- First holder: James Stanhope, 1st Earl Stanhope
- Last holder: James Richard Stanhope, 13th Earl of Chesterfield, 7th Earl Stanhope
- Subsidiary titles: Baron Stanhope; Stanhope (later Scudamore-Stanhope) baronets, of Stanwell
- Status: Extinct
- Seat: Bretby Hall

Earl of Chesterfield, in the County of Derby, was a title in the Peerage of England. It was created in 1628 for Philip Stanhope, 1st Baron Stanhope. He had been created Baron Stanhope, of Shelford in the County of Nottingham, in 1616, also in the Peerage of England. Stanhope's youngest son, the Hon. Alexander Stanhope, was the father of James Stanhope, 1st Earl Stanhope, while his half-brother Sir John Stanhope of Elvaston was the great-grandfather of William Stanhope, 1st Earl of Harrington.

== Subsequent history ==
Lord Chesterfield's great-great-grandson, the fourth Earl, was a politician and man of letters and notably served as Lord Lieutenant of Ireland and as Secretary of State for the Northern Department. He also achieved posthumous renown for his Letters to his Son. He was succeeded by his third cousin once removed, the fifth Earl. He was the son of Arthur Charles Stanhope, son of the Reverend Michael Stanhope, grandson of the Hon. Arthur Stanhope, younger son of the first Earl. Lord Chesterfield was Ambassador to Spain and also served under William Pitt the Younger as Master of the Mint and Postmaster General. His son, the sixth Earl, was a Tory politician and served as Master of the Buckhounds from 1834 to 1835 in Sir Robert Peel's first administration. His son, the seventh Earl, represented Nottinghamshire South in the House of Commons.

He never married and was succeeded by his third cousin, the eighth Earl. He was grandson of Rear-Admiral John Stanhope, son of Ferdinand Stanhope, younger son of the aforementioned Reverend Michael Stanhope. On his death in 1883 this line of the family also failed and he was succeeded by his fourth cousin Sir Henry Edwyn Chandos Scudamore-Stanhope, 3rd Baronet, of Stanwell, who became the ninth Earl (for earlier history of the baronetcy, see below). His eldest son, the tenth Earl, was a prominent Liberal politician and notably served as Captain of the Yeomen of the Guard from 1894 to 1895. On his death the titles passed to his younger brother, the eleventh Earl. He was a Captain in the Royal Navy. He died unmarried and was succeeded by his nephew, the twelfth Earl. He was the son of the Hon. Evelyn Theodore Scudamore-Stanhope, younger son of the ninth Earl. He had no sons and on his death in 1952 the baronetcy became extinct.

However, he was succeeded in the earldom and barony by his distant relative James Richard Stanhope, 7th Earl Stanhope, who became the thirteenth Earl of Chesterfield and thirteenth Baron Stanhope. However, he never petitioned for a writ of summons to the House of Lords in these titles and continued to be known as the Earl Stanhope. On his death in 1967 the earldoms of Stanhope and Chesterfield and barony of Stanhope became extinct. He was succeeded in the junior titles attached to the earldom of Stanhope – the viscountcy of Stanhope (of Mahon) and barony of Stanhope (of Elvaston) – by his kinsman, the eleventh Earl of Harrington.

The Stanhope baronetcy, of Stanwell in the County of Middlesex, was created in the Baronetage of the United Kingdom in 1807 for Henry Stanhope. He was the grandson of Charles Stanhope, younger brother of the aforementioned the Reverend Michael Stanhope and grandson of the Hon. Arthur Stanhope, younger son of the first Earl of Chesterfield. His son, the second Baronet, assumed by Royal licence the additional surname of Scudamore in 1827. His son, the third Baronet, succeeded his fourth cousin as ninth Earl of Chesterfield in 1883. For further history of the baronetcy, see above.

Katherine, Lady Stanhope, widow of Henry Stanhope, Lord Stanhope, the eldest son of the first Earl of Chesterfield and father of the second Earl, was created Countess of Chesterfield for life in 1660.

The ancestral seat of the Earls of Chesterfield was Bretby Hall at Bretby, Derbyshire.

== Earls of Chesterfield (1628) ==
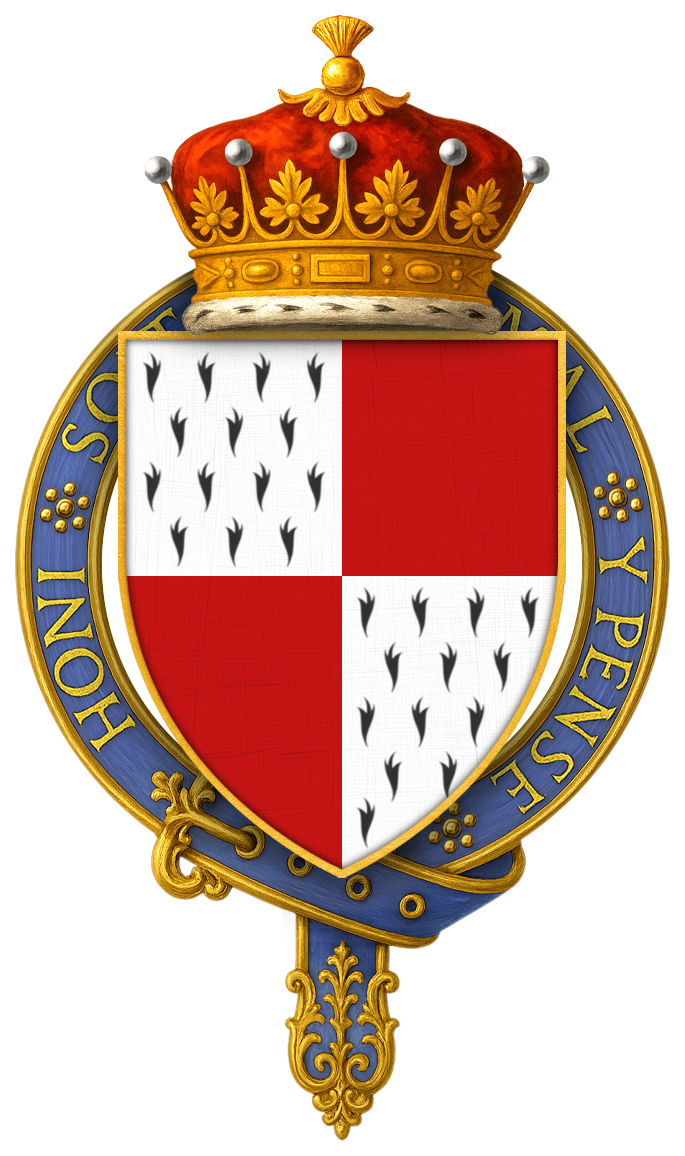
Coat of arms of Philip Stanhope, 5th Earl of Chesterfield

- Philip Stanhope, 1st Earl of Chesterfield (1584–1656)
  - Henry Stanhope, Lord Stanhope (d. 1634)
- Philip Stanhope, 2nd Earl of Chesterfield (1634–1714)
- Philip Stanhope, 3rd Earl of Chesterfield (1672–1726)
- Philip Dormer Stanhope, 4th Earl of Chesterfield (1694–1773)
- Philip Stanhope, 5th Earl of Chesterfield (1755–1815)
- George Stanhope, 6th Earl of Chesterfield (1805–1866)
- George Philip Cecil Arthur Stanhope, 7th Earl of Chesterfield (1831–1871)
- George Philip Stanhope, 8th Earl of Chesterfield (1822–1883)
  - Philip Laurence John Stanhope (1857–1860)
- Henry Edwyn Chandos Scudamore-Stanhope, 9th Earl of Chesterfield (1821–1887)
- Edwyn Francis Scudamore-Stanhope, 10th Earl of Chesterfield (1854–1933)
- Henry Athole Scudamore-Stanhope, 11th Earl of Chesterfield (1855–1935)
- Edward Henry Scudamore-Stanhope, 12th Earl of Chesterfield (1889–1952)
- James Richard Stanhope, 13th Earl of Chesterfield, 7th Earl Stanhope (1880–1967)

== Countess of Chesterfield (1660) ==
- Katherine Stanhope, Countess of Chesterfield (d. 1667)

== Stanhope (later Scudamore-Stanhope) baronets, of Stanwell (1807) ==
- Sir Henry Edwyn Stanhope, 1st Baronet (1754–1814)
- Sir Edwyn Scudamore-Stanhope, 2nd Baronet (1793–1874)
- Sir Henry Edwyn Chandos Scudamore-Stanhope, 3rd Baronet (1821–1887), succeeded as 9th Earl of Chesterfield in 1883

== Arms ==
Coat of arms of Earl of Chesterfield
Crest A tower Azure issuant therefrom a demi-lion rampant Or ducally crowned Gules and holding between the paws a bomb fired Proper. Escutcheon Quarterly Ermine and Gules. Supporters Dexter a wolf ducally crowned Or, sinister a talbot Ermine. Motto A Deo Et Rege (Latin for "From God and the King"); Depicted: Exitus Acta Probat (Latin for "The end justifies the means")

== See also ==
- Countess of Chesterfield (disambiguation)
- Earl Stanhope
- Earl of Harrington
- Baron Stanhope, of Harrington

Baronetage of the United Kingdom
Preceded by Burrard baronets	Stanhope baronets of Stanwell; 13 November 1807	Succeeded by Blomefield baronets
