= James Stanhope =

James Stanhope may refer to:

- James Stanhope, 1st Earl Stanhope (c. 1673–1721), British statesman and soldier
- James Stanhope, 7th Earl Stanhope (1880–1967), British politician
- James Hamilton Stanhope (1788–1825), British soldier and MP
- James Stanhope (MP) (1821–1904), Member of Parliament for North Lincolnshire, 1852–1868
