= Michael Stanhope =

Michael Stanhope may refer to:

- Sir Michael Stanhope (died 1552) (bef. 1508–1552), Member of Parliament (MP) for Nottinghamshire
- Sir Michael Stanhope (died c. 1621) (1549–c. 1621), MP for Ipswich, Orford and Castle Rising, son of above
- Michael Stanhope (Royalist) (died 1648), colonel killed at the battle at Willoughby Field, Nottinghamshire
- Michael Stanhope (priest) (died 1737), Canon of Windsor
