= Richard Cudmore =

English instrumentalist and composer

Richard Cudmore (1787 – 29 December 1840) was an English musician. Primarily a violinist, he also played cello and piano, and was a composer.

== Life ==
Cudmore was born in Chichester in 1787. He developed a talent for music at a very early age. His first instructor was James Forgett, a local organist, under whom he learnt the violin, acquiring such proficiency that at the age of nine he played a solo at a concert in Chichester. About 1797 he was placed under Joseph Reinagle, and shortly afterwards became a pupil of Johann Peter Salomon, with whom he studied the violin for two years. In 1799 he led the band at the Chichester theatre, and in the same year was engaged as a first violin in the orchestra at Italian Opera in London.

He returned soon afterwards to Chichester, where he remained until 1808; in that year he moved to London, studied the piano under Joseph Woelfl, and appeared as a solo pianist and violinist at the principal concerts. He also became a member of the Philharmonic Society orchestra. Shortly afterwards Cudmore settled in Manchester, where for many years he led the Gentlemen's Concerts. He was also often engaged at Liverpool, where on one occasion he played at a concert a violin concerto by Pierre Rode, a piano concerto by Friedrich Kalkbrenner and a cello concerto by Giacobbe Cervetto.

He was known for his ability in sight-reading; he also was in some repute as a composer of concertos and other works, for his various instruments. His most notable work was an oratorio, The Martyr of Antioch, on Henry Milman's poem of the same name. Selections from this were performed at Birmingham and Manchester, and the work was published by subscription. Cudmore died at Wilton Street, Oxford Road, Manchester, on 29 December 1840. He left a widow and family.
