= Stanhope, Ohio =

Unincorporated community in Ohio, U.S.

Coordinates: 41°29′54″N 80°36′14″W

Stanhope is an unincorporated community in Ashtabula and Trumbull counties, in the U.S. state of Ohio.

== History ==
A post office was established at Stanhope in 1891, and remained in operation until 1893. The community has the name of one Captain Stanhope.
