= Philip Stanhope, 4th Earl of Chesterfield =

British politician, diplomat and writer (1694–1773)

The Right Honourable The Earl of Chesterfield KG PC
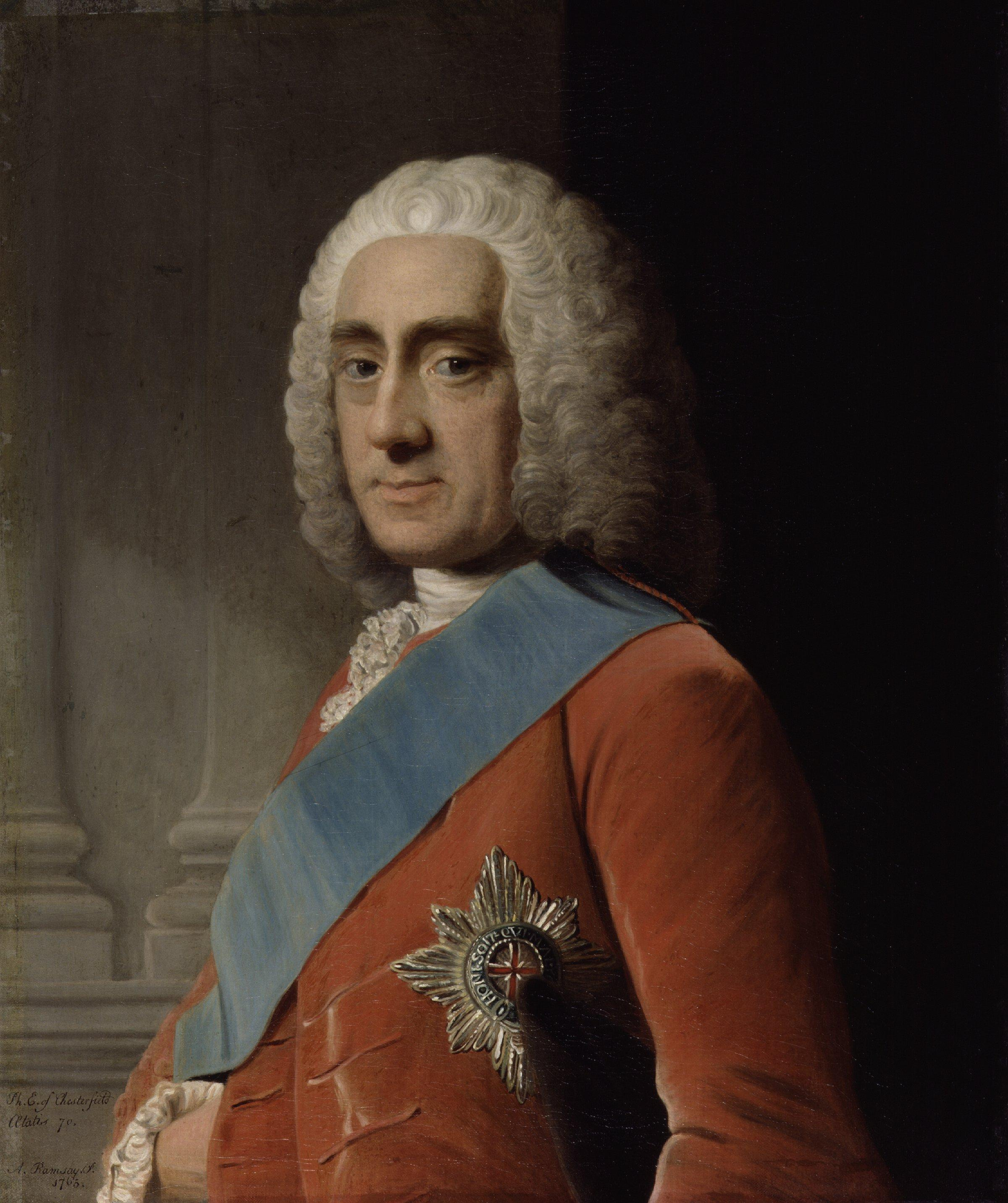
- Portrait by Allan Ramsay, 1765

Secretary of State for the Northern Department
- In office 29 October 1746 – 6 February 1748
- Monarch: George II
- Prime Minister: Henry Pelham
- Preceded by: The Earl of Harrington
- Succeeded by: The Duke of Newcastle

Lord Lieutenant of Ireland
- In office 8 January 1745 – 29 October 1746
- Monarch: George II
- Prime Minister: Henry Pelham
- Preceded by: The Duke of Devonshire
- Succeeded by: The Earl of Harrington

Lord Steward of the Household
- In office 19 June 1730 – 13 April 1733
- Monarch: George II
- Prime Minister: Robert Walpole
- Preceded by: The Duke of Dorset
- Succeeded by: The Duke of Devonshire

Captain of the Yeomen of the Guard
- In office 1723–1725
- Monarch: George I
- Prime Minister: Robert Walpole
- Preceded by: The Earl of Derby
- Succeeded by: The Earl of Leicester

Personal details
- Born: 22 September 1694 London, England
- Died: 24 March 1773 (aged 78) Chesterfield House, Westminster, London, England
- Spouse: Melusina von der Schulenburg (m. 1733)
- Children: Philip (illegitimate)
- Parent(s): Philip Stanhope, 3rd Earl of Chesterfield; Lady Elizabeth Savile

Philip Dormer Stanhope, 4th Earl of Chesterfield (22 September 1694 – 24 March 1773) was a British politician, diplomat and writer.

== Early life ==
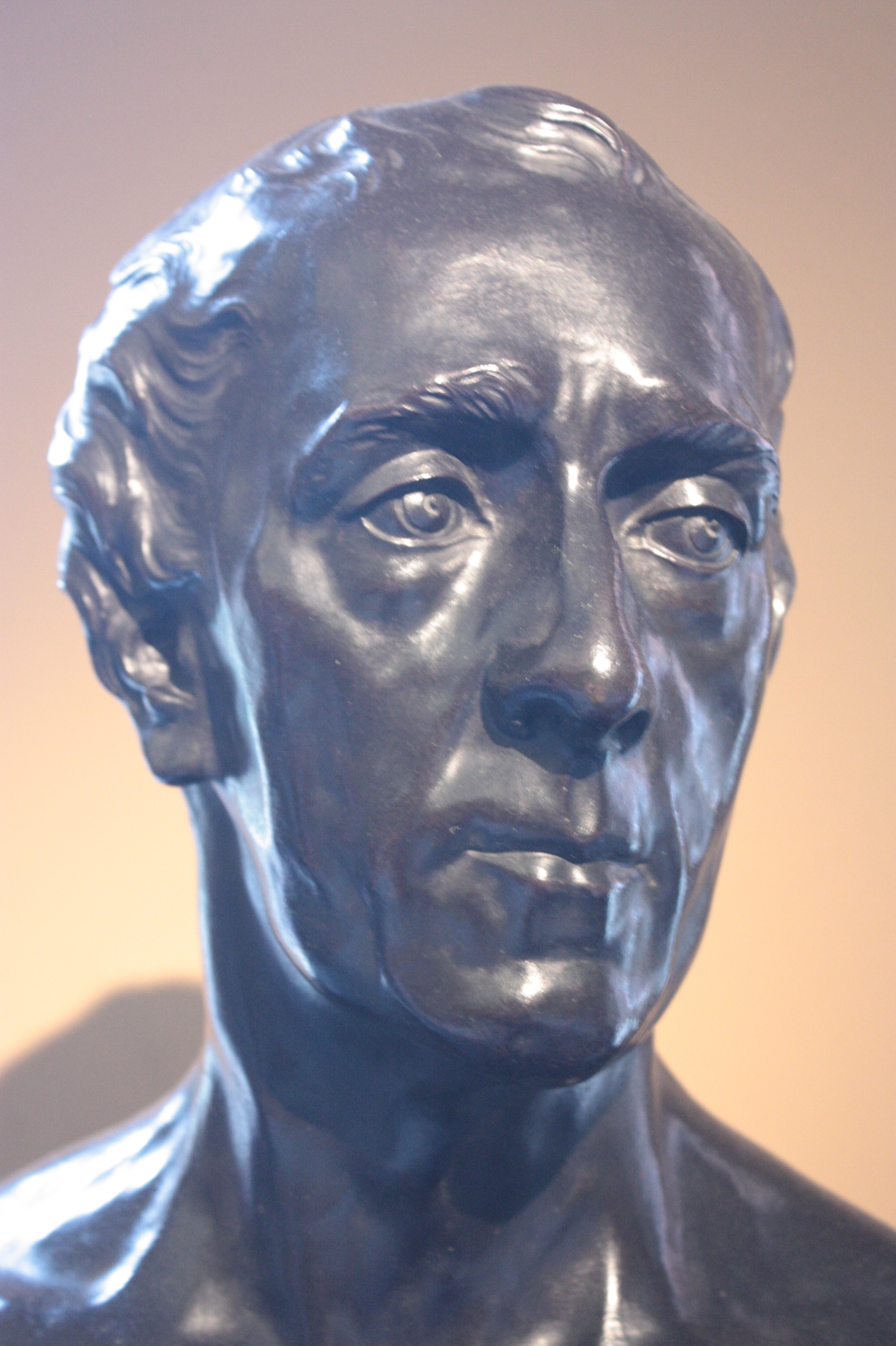
1745 bust of Chesterfield by Roubiliac

He was born in London to Philip Stanhope, 3rd Earl of Chesterfield, and Lady Elizabeth Savile, and known by the courtesy title of Lord Stanhope until the death of his father in 1726. Following the death of his mother in 1708, Stanhope was raised mainly by his grandmother, the Marchioness of Halifax. Educated at Trinity Hall, Cambridge, he left just over a year into his studies, after focusing on languages and oration. He subsequently embarked on the Grand Tour, to complete his education as a nobleman, by exposure to the cultural legacies of Classical antiquity and the Renaissance, and to become acquainted with his aristocratic counterparts and the polite society of Continental Europe.

In the course of his tour, the death of Queen Anne and accession of King George I in 1714 opened a political career for Stanhope, and he quickly returned to England. A supporter of the Whig party, he entered government service as a courtier to the King, through the mentorship of his relative, James Stanhope (later 1st Earl Stanhope), the King's favourite minister, who procured his appointment as Lord of the Bedchamber to the Prince of Wales.

== Political career ==
In 1715, Stanhope entered the House of Commons as Lord Stanhope of Shelford and as member for St Germans. Later, when the impeachment of James Butler, 2nd Duke of Ormonde came before the House, he used the occasion (5 August 1715) to try out the result of his rhetorical studies. His maiden speech was fluent and dogmatic, but upon its conclusion, another member, after first complimenting the speech, reminded the young orator that he was still six weeks short of his age of majority and consequently liable to a fine of £500 for speaking in the House. Lord Stanhope left with a low bow, and set out for the Continent.

While in Paris, he sent the government valuable information about the developing Jacobite plot. In 1716, he returned to Britain, resumed his Commons seat and became known as a skilled yet tactful debater. When George I quarrelled with the Prince of Wales the same year, Lord Stanhope remained politically faithful to the Prince but was careful not to break with the King's party. However, his continued friendly correspondence with the Prince's mistress, Henrietta Howard, earned Chesterfield the personal hatred of the Prince's wife, Princess Caroline of Ansbach. In 1723, he was appointed Captain of the Gentlemen Pensioners. In January 1725, on the revival of the Order of the Bath, the red ribbon was offered to him, but Stanhope declined the honour.

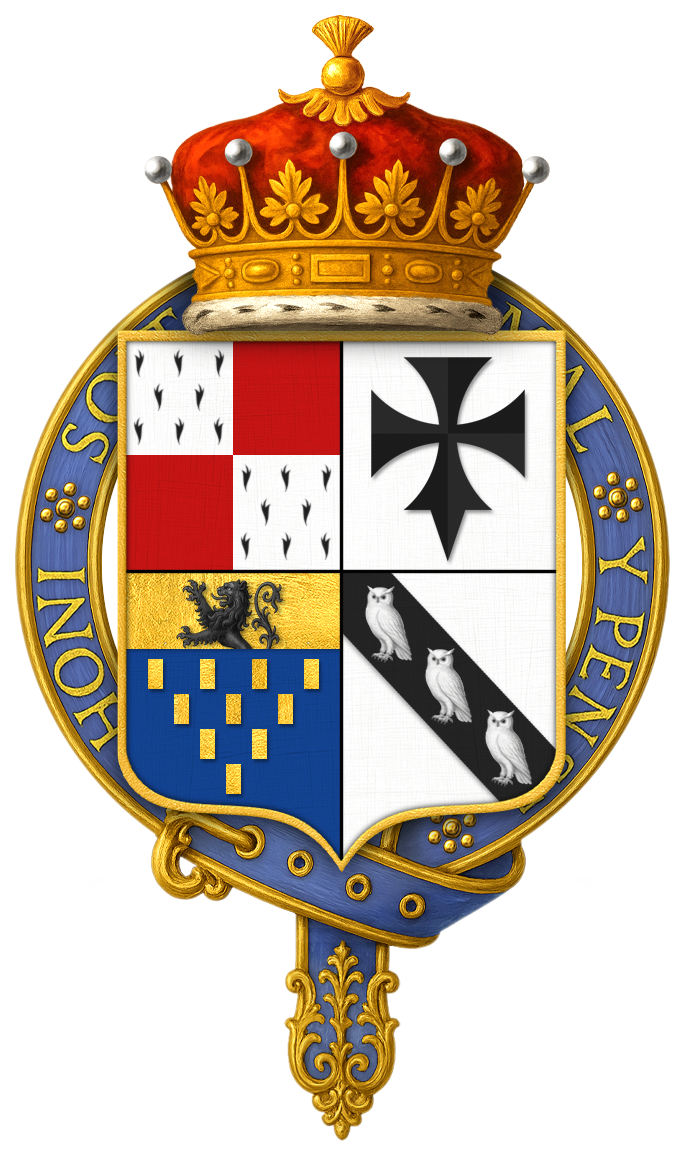
Chesterfield's coat of arms

Upon his father's death in 1726, Stanhope became the 4th Earl of Chesterfield and assumed his seat in the House of Lords. His inclination towards oration, often seen as ineffective in the House of Commons because of its polish and lack of force, was met with appreciation in the House of Lords, and won many to his side. In 1727 the Prince of Wales succeeded his father, becoming King George II. In 1728, in service to the new king, Chesterfield was sent to the Hague as ambassador to The Netherlands, where his gentle tact and linguistic dexterity served him well. As a reward for his diplomatic service, Chesterfield received the Order of the Garter in 1730, the position of Lord Steward, and the friendship of Robert Walpole, the de facto head of the government. While a British envoy in the Hague, he helped negotiate the second Treaty of Vienna (1731), which signalled the collapse of the Anglo-French Alliance, and the beginning of the Anglo-Austrian Alliance. In 1732, Madelina Elizabeth du Bouchet, a French governess, gave birth to his illegitimate son, Philip for whom Chesterfield wrote the Letters to his Son giving advice on life. In 1731, while at The Hague, Chesterfield initiated the Grand Duke of Tuscany (later to become Francis I, Holy Roman Emperor) from the House of Habsburg-Lorraine into Freemasonry, which was at the time being used as an intelligence network by the British Whigs. By the end of 1732, ill health and financial troubles caused Chesterfield's return to Britain and his resignation as ambassador.

In 1733, Chesterfield married Melusina von der Schulenberg, the Countess of Walsingham, who was the illegitimate daughter of Melusine von der Schulenburg, Duchess of Kendal by George I. After recuperating from his illness, Chesterfield resumed his seat in the House of Lords, where he was now one of the acknowledged leaders. He supported the ministry and leadership of Robert Walpole, but withheld the blind fealty that Walpole preferred of his followers. Lord Chesterfield strongly opposed the Excise Bill, the Whig Party leader's measure, in the House of Lords, and his brothers also argued against it in the House of Commons. Even though Walpole eventually succumbed to the political opposition to the bill and abandoned the measure, Chesterfield was summarily dismissed from his stewardship. For the next two years, he led the opposition in the Upper House to effect Walpole's downfall. During that time, he resided in Grosvenor Square and became involved in the creation of a new charity called the Foundling Hospital of which he was a founding governor.

In 1741, Chesterfield signed the protest calling for Walpole's dismissal and then went abroad on account of his health; after visiting Voltaire in Brussels, he went to Paris where he associated with writers and men of letters, including Crebillon the Younger, Fontenelle and Montesquieu. In 1742, Walpole's fall from political power was complete, but although he and his administration had been overthrown in no small part by Chesterfield's efforts, the new ministry did not count Chesterfield either in its ranks or among its supporters. He remained in opposition and distinguished himself by the courtly bitterness of his attacks on George II, who began to hate him violently.

In 1743, Chesterfield began writing under the name of "Jeffrey Broadbottom" for pamphlets and a new journal, Old England; or, the Constitutional Journal, which appeared (broad bottom being a term for a government with cross-party appeal). In parallel with the journal, Chesterfield and George Bubb Dodington also patronised paired opposition histories: William Guthrie’s A General History of England (planned to 1688) and James Ralph’s The History of England, During the Reigns of King William, Queen Anne, and King George I (1744–46). A number of pamphlets, with which Chesterfield had the help of Edmund Waller, followed. His energetic campaign against the King and his government won the gratitude of the Dowager Duchess of Marlborough, who left him £20,000 as a mark of her appreciation. In 1744, the King was compelled to abandon Lord Carteret, the successor to Walpole, and the coalition for a "Broad Bottom" party, led by Chesterfield and Pitt, came into office in coalition with the Pelhams. In the troubled state of European politics, the Earl's calm conduct and diplomatic experience were more useful abroad than at home, and he was sent to The Hague for a second time as ambassador. The object of his mission this time was to persuade the Dutch to join in the War of the Austrian Succession and to arrange the details of their assistance. Success was quickly achieved, and on his return a few weeks afterwards, he received the Lord-Lieutenancy of Ireland, which he had long coveted.

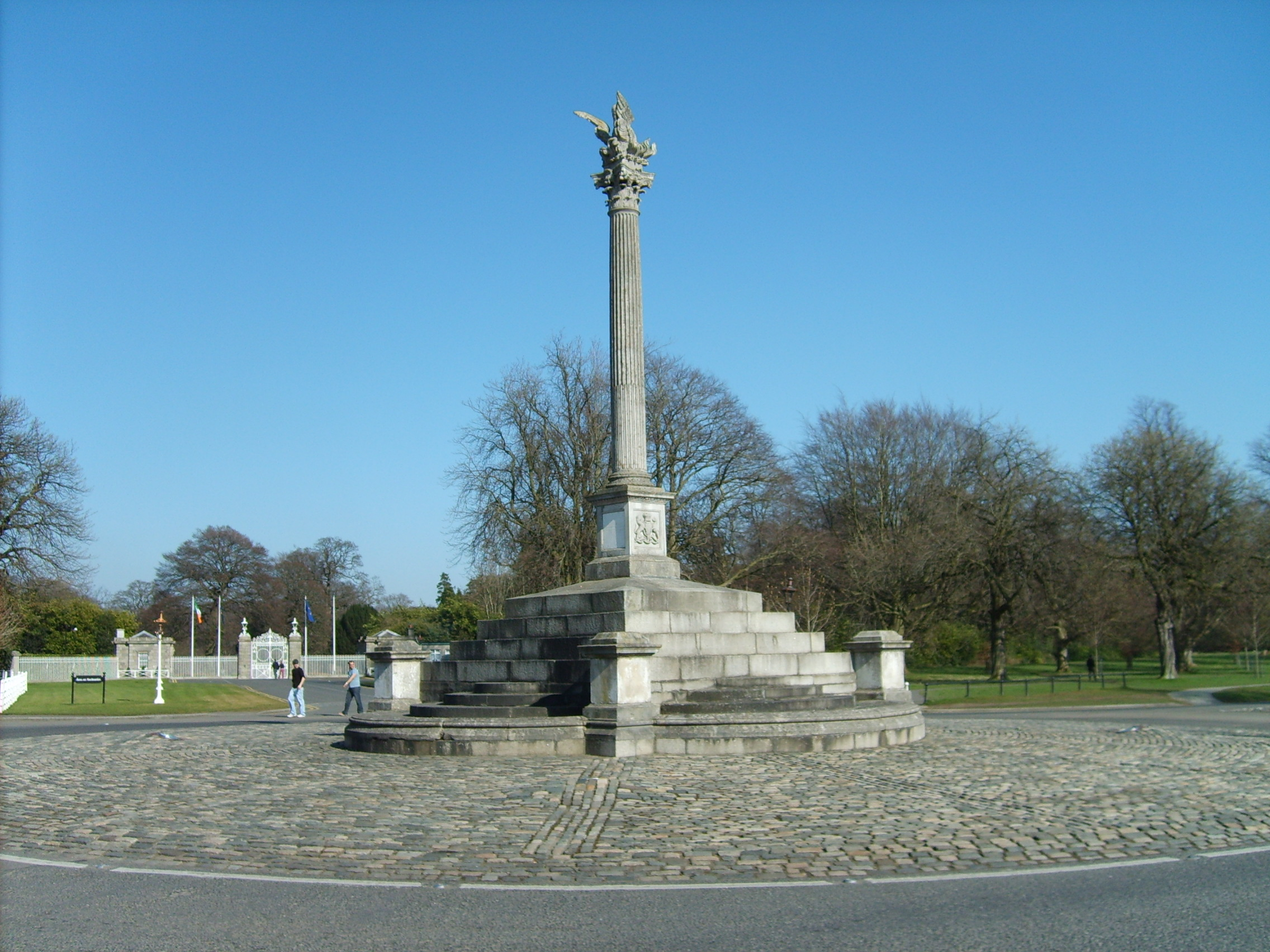
Chesterfield's "Phoenix Monument" (1746) in Phoenix Park, Dublin

Chesterfield's short administration (January 1745 – November 1746) in Ireland was effective, as he repressed the corruption traditional to the office, and established schools and factories. He was the first official to allow Dubliners to roam in Phoenix Park, and installed the central "Phoenix Monument", a phoenix bird on a Corinthian column (the 2.8 mi main road through the park is still known as Chesterfield Avenue). He worked with, and pacified, both the Protestant Orange Order and Roman Catholic Jacobite factions; as a result, Irish Jacobites did not assist the Jacobite rising of 1745. Anecdotally, upon being roused for a false alarm of an Irish rebellion and being told that "the papists in Ireland are all up!", he replied: "I am not surprised at it, why, it is ten o'clock, I should have been up too, had I not overslept myself".

In 1746, however, he had to exchange the Lord-Lieutenancy for the post of Secretary of State. Chesterfield had hoped to retain a hold over the King through the influence of Lady Yarmouth, by then George II's mistress, but John Montagu, 4th Earl of Sandwich and Thomas Pelham-Holles, 1st Duke of Newcastle, combined forces against him, and in 1748, he resigned the ministerial seal and returned to his books and playing cards with the admirable composure that was one of his most striking characteristics. Despite his denials, Chesterfield is speculated to have at least helped to write "Apology for a late Resignation", in a Letter from an English Gentleman to his Friend at The Hague, which ran to four editions in 1748.

== Later years ==
While continuing to attend and participate in the Upper House's proceedings, Chesterfield turned down the dukedom offered to him by George II, whose wrath had melted in the face of Chesterfield's diplomacy and rhetoric. In 1751, seconded by George Parker, 2nd Earl of Macclesfield, the president of the Royal Society, and the mathematician James Bradley, Chesterfield greatly distinguished himself in the debates on establishing a definitive calendar for Britain and the Commonwealth. With the Calendar (New Style) Act 1750, he successfully established the Gregorian calendar and a calendar year that began on 1 January for Great Britain, which had lagged behind other European countries in adopting the Gregorian calendar. Informally, the Act was also known as the "Chesterfield's Act". After this, he gradually started to withdraw from politics and society because of his growing deafness.

In 1755, he and Samuel Johnson had a dispute over A Dictionary of the English Language. Eight years previously, Johnson had sent Chesterfield an outline of his Dictionary, along with a business offer for promoting the proposed work; Chesterfield agreed and invested £10. Although Chesterfield wrote two anonymous articles for World magazine shortly before the dictionary's publication praising both Johnson's exhaustive editorial work and the dictionary itself, Johnson was disappointed at the lack of interest in the project from Chesterfield during compilation of the dictionary. Upset with what he saw as a lack of support from an avowed man of letters and patron of literature, Johnson wrote the Letter to Chesterfield, which dealt with the dynamics of the patron–artist relationship. Chesterfield was not offended by the letter but, rather, was impressed by its language. After receiving it, he displayed it on a table for visitors to read and, according to Robert Dodsley, said "This man has great powers" and then he "pointed out the severest passages, and observed how well they were expressed". Adams told Johnson what was said, and Johnson responded, "That is not Lord Chesterfield; he is the proudest man this day". Adams responded, "No, there is one person at least as proud; I think, by your own account, you are the prouder man of the two". Johnson, finishing, said, "But mine, was defensive pride".

In the 1760s, Chesterfield offered a cogent critique of the Stamp Act 1765 passed through Parliament by George Grenville's ministry. In a letter to his friend, the Duke of Newcastle, Chesterfield noted the absurdity of the Stamp Act because it could not be properly enforced, but if made effective, the Act would anyway generate a revenue no greater than £8,000 per year, but the annual cost of reduced trade from the American colonies would be about £1,000,000.

== Letters to His Son ==
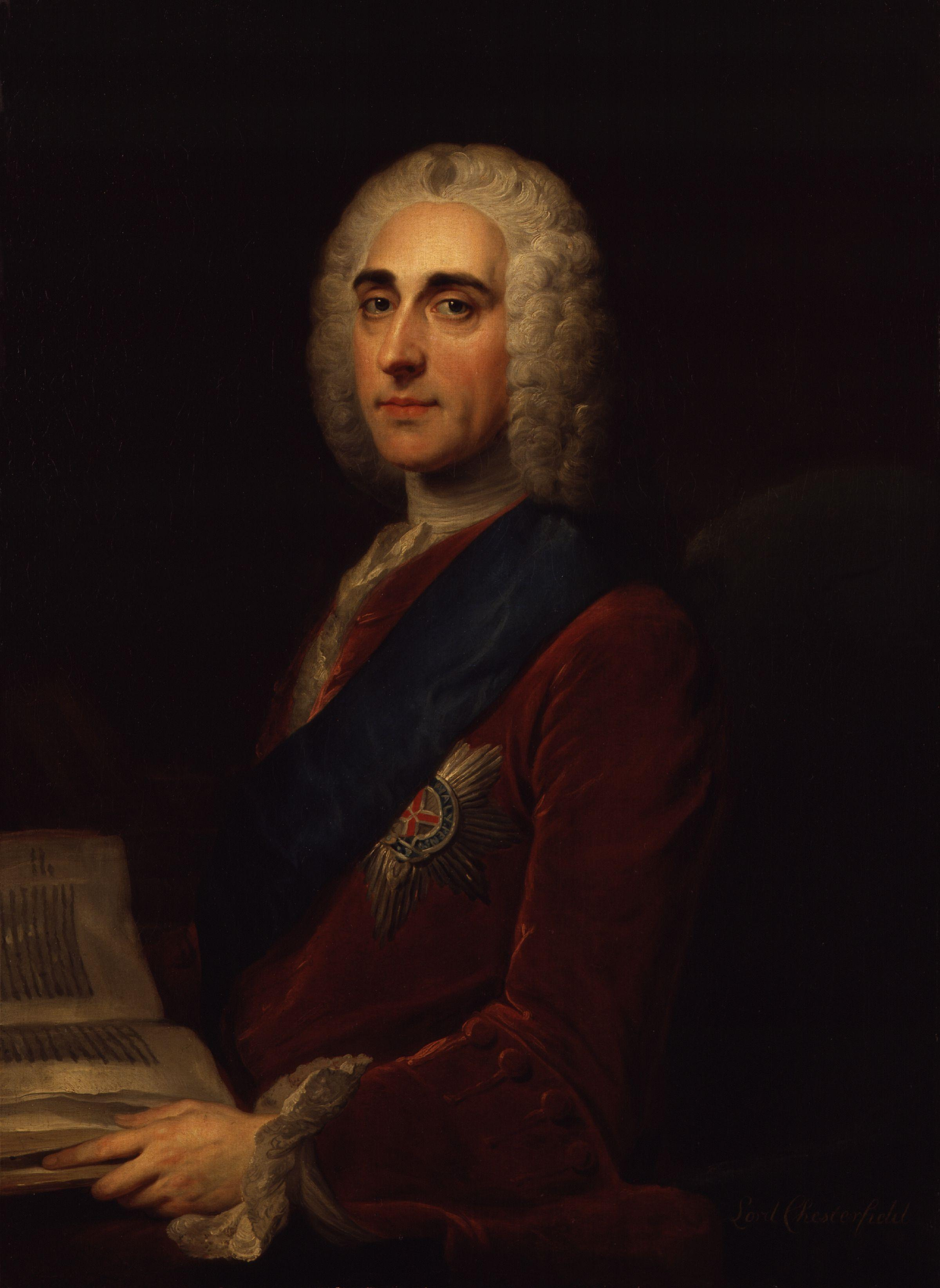
Portrait of Chesterfield by William Hoare

Eugenia Stanhope, the impoverished widow of Chesterfield's illegitimate son, Philip Stanhope, was the first to publish the book Letters to His Son on the Art of Becoming a Man of the World and a Gentleman (1774), which comprises a thirty-year correspondence in more than 400 letters. Begun in 1737 and continued until the death of his son in 1768, Chesterfield wrote mostly instructive communications about geography, history, and classical literature, with later letters focusing on politics and diplomacy. The letters were written in French, English and Latin to refine his son's grasp of the languages.

As a handbook for social conduct in the 18th century, Letters to His Son offers advice on etiquette and good manners:

... However frivolous a company may be, still, while you are among them, do not show them, by your inattention, that you think them so; but rather take their tone, and conform in some degree to their weakness, instead of manifesting your contempt for them. There is nothing that people bear more impatiently, or forgive less, than contempt; and an injury is much sooner forgotten than an insult. If, therefore, you would rather please than offend, rather be well than ill spoken of, rather be loved than hated; remember to have that constant attention about you which flatters every man's little vanity; and the want of which, by mortifying his pride, never fails to excite his resentment, or at least his ill will....

Samuel Johnson said of the letters that "they teach the morals of a whore, and the manners of a dancing-master" as a means for getting on in the world, implying that Chesterfield promoted good manners as a method of advancement rather than because of their inherent moral value.

Despite having been an accomplished essayist and epigrammatist in his time, Lord Chesterfield's literary reputation today derives almost entirely from Letters to His Son on the Art of Becoming a Man of the World and a Gentleman (1774) and Letters to His Godson (1890), books of private correspondence and paternal and avuncular advice that he never intended for publication.

== Need for legitimate heir ==
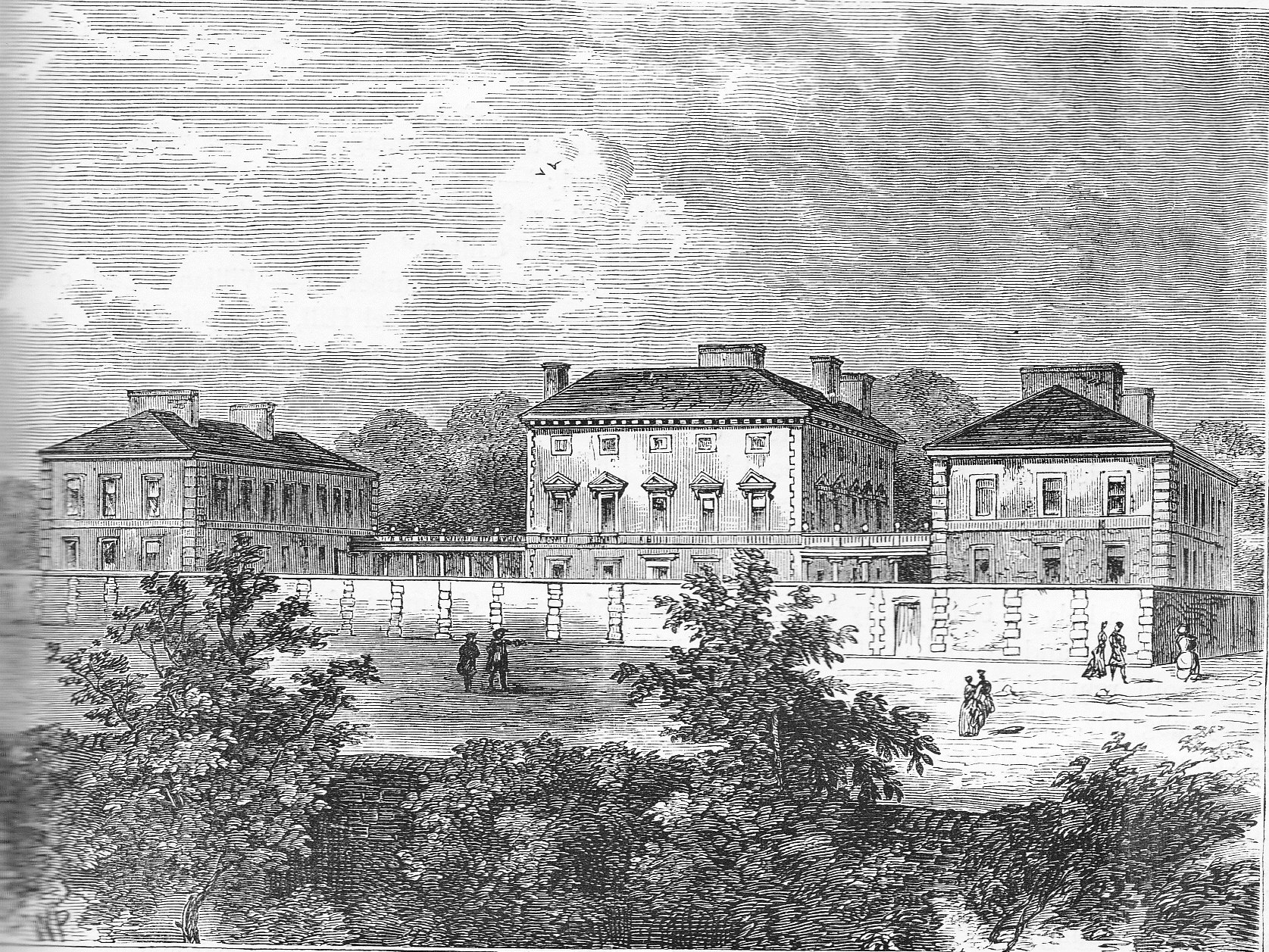
Chesterfield House in 1760 (Old & New London, 1878)

In 1768 Chesterfield's illegitimate son, Philip Stanhope, died in France of dropsy, leaving his widow Eugenia Stanhope and their two illegitimate sons, Charles and Philip. Despite his short life, the privileged education provided by his father had enabled for Philip a career in the diplomatic service, despite being handicapped as a nobleman's illegitimate son. The grieving Chesterfield was disappointed to learn of Philip's long and mostly secret relationship (they married the year before his death) with Eugenia, a woman of a humble social class, since that was a topic that he had covered at length in the Letters to his Son. However, Lord Chesterfield bequeathed an annuity of £100 to each of his grandsons, Charles Stanhope (1761–1845) and Philip Stanhope (1763–1801), and a further £10,000 for them both, but left no pension for Eugenia. It was that lack of funds that led her to sell the Letters to his Son to a publisher.

Left without a legitimate heir to his lands and property (he and his wife had no children together) Lord Chesterfield acted to protect his hereditary interests by adopting his distant cousin and godson, Philip Stanhope (1755–1815), a descendant of the 1st Earl of Chesterfield, as his heir and successor to the title of Earl of Chesterfield.

== Death ==
Chesterfield died on 24 March 1773, at Chesterfield House, Westminster, his London townhouse. His godson and adopted heir then became Philip Stanhope, 5th Earl of Chesterfield.

== Legacy ==
=== In literature ===
Decades after his death, Lord Chesterfield appears as a character in William Makepeace Thackeray's novel The Virginians (1857). He is also mentioned in Charles Dickens' novel Barnaby Rudge (1841), wherein the foppish Sir John Chester says that Lord Chesterfield is the finest English writer:

Shakespeare was undoubtedly very fine in his way; Milton good, though prosy; Lord Bacon deep, and decidedly knowing; but the writer who should be his country's pride, is my Lord Chesterfield.

=== Places ===
In the UK, Chesterfield gave his name to Chesterfield Street, Mayfair, London, which runs from Curzon Street, site of the former Chesterfield House; in the US, his name has been given to Chesterfield County, Virginia, Chesterfield County, South Carolina and Chesterfield, New Hampshire. There is also a Chesterfield Road in the West Oakland neighbourhood of Pittsburgh filled with rowhouses, formerly known for its punk subculture.

=== Furniture ===
The first leather Chesterfield sofa, with its distinctive deep-buttoned, quilted leather upholstery and lower seat base, is believed to have been commissioned by Lord Chesterfield. Consequently, in the UK, the word chesterfield now describes such a sofa, with arms and back of the same height. In Canada, chesterfield used to be the predominant term for any type of couch, but has been decreasing in popularity among the younger generations.

=== Other ===
Vincent La Chapelle, a French master cook, wrote The Modern Cook while in the employ of Lord Chesterfield, and lived abroad with him in The Hague. After leaving Chesterfield's service, La Chapelle went on to cook for – among others – William IV, Prince of Orange, John V of Portugal, and Madame de Pompadour (mistress of Louis XV).

Chesterfield coats, popularized by the 6th Earl, are woollen overcoats with velvet on the collar for both men and women.

D. G. Yuengling & Son of Pottsville, Pennsylvania, produces a beer named Lord Chesterfield Ale after the 4th Earl of Chesterfield.

Parliament of Great Britain
Preceded by John Knight; Waller Bacon	Member of Parliament for St Germans; 1715–1722; With: John Knight	Succeeded by Lord Binning; Philip Cavendish
Preceded by Marquess of Hartington; John Newsham	Member of Parliament for Lostwithiel; 1722–1724; With: Marquess of Hartington	Succeeded by Sir Orlando Bridgeman; Henry Parsons
Political offices
Preceded by The Earl of Derby	Captain of the Yeomen of the Guard; 1723–1725	Succeeded by The Earl of Leicester
Preceded by The Duke of Dorset	Lord Steward; 1730–1733	Succeeded by The Duke of Devonshire
Preceded by The Duke of Devonshire	Lord Lieutenant of Ireland; 1745–1746	Succeeded by The Earl of Harrington
Preceded by The Earl of Harrington	Northern Secretary; 1746–1748	Succeeded by The Duke of Newcastle
Peerage of England
Preceded by Philip Stanhope	Earl of Chesterfield; 1726–1773	Succeeded by Philip Stanhope
