= Philip Stanhope, 3rd Earl of Chesterfield =

English peer

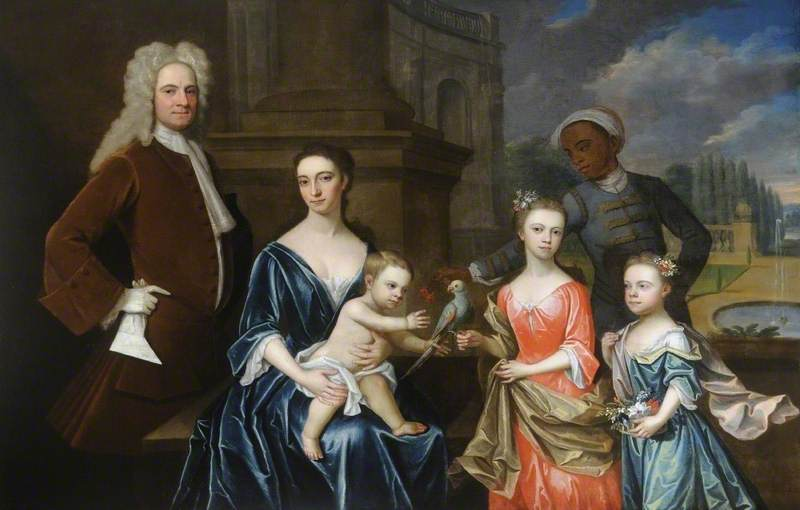
c. 1695 portrait of Chesterfield and his wife Elizabeth, three of his children and a Black servant

Philip Stanhope, 3rd Earl of Chesterfield (3 February 1673 – 27 January 1726) was an English peer. He was the eldest son of Philip Stanhope, 2nd Earl of Chesterfield, by his third wife, Lady Elizabeth Stanhope. In 1692, Stanhope married Lady Elizabeth Savile, daughter of George Savile, 1st Marquess of Halifax. He was succeeded by his son, Philip Stanhope, 4th Earl of Chesterfield. His second son was Sir William Stanhope, a politician.

Peerage of England
Preceded by Philip Stanhope	Earl of Chesterfield; 1714–1726	Succeeded by Philip Stanhope
