= Edward Scudamore-Stanhope, 12th Earl of Chesterfield =

English nobleman

Edward Henry Scudamore-Stanhope, 12th Earl of Chesterfield (9 February 1889 – 2 August 1952), was an English nobleman.

== Life ==
He was the only son of The Honorable Evelyn Theodore Scudamore-Stanhope, the fifth and youngest son of Henry Scudamore-Stanhope, 9th Earl of Chesterfield, and his wife Julia Dasha Potter, daughter of John Gerald Potter. He succeeded as 12th earl in 1935 after two of his uncles had succeeded his grandfather as tenth and eleventh earls respectively. Both had died without issue and were predeceased by their younger brothers.

He died on 2 August 1952.

== Family ==
He married first Lorna Marie Lever (daughter of Mr. William Henry Lever of Wellington, New Zealand), on 17 September 1915. Through this marriage he had his only child, a daughter, Evelyn Patricia Mary Scudamore-Stanhope, born 7 May 1917 in Kuala Lumpur where he was growing tea.

The marriage was dissolved in 1925 and the Earl of Chesterfield went on to marry Angela Domatilla Hopkins, daughter of Francis Patrick Hopkins.

Peerage of England
| Preceded by Henry Scudamore-Stanhope | Earl of Chesterfield; 1935–1952 | Succeeded by James Stanhope |
Baronetage of the United Kingdom
| Preceded by Henry Scudamore-Stanhope | Baronet (of Stanwell); 1935–1952 | Extinct |
