= Elizabeth Stanhope, Countess of Chesterfield (d. 1708) =

English noblewoman

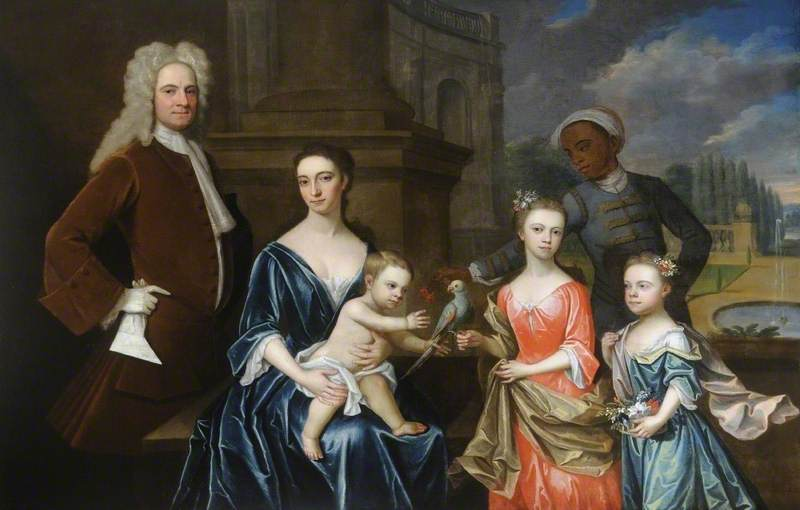
A c. 1695 portrait of Elizabeth, her husband Philip, three of their children and a Black servant

Elizabeth Stanhope, Countess of Chesterfield (c. 1677 – c. 1708) was an English noblewoman who was the wife of Philip Stanhope, 3rd Earl of Chesterfield and the daughter of George Savile, 1st Marquess of Halifax. Her mother was probably Gertrude Pierrepont, Halifax's second wife. It was to Elizabeth that her father addressed a work entitled The Lady’s New Year's Gift: or Advice to a Daughter. She married Philip Stanhope in 1692. They had one son, Philip Dormer Stanhope, 4th Earl of Chesterfield.
