= Enid Scudamore-Stanhope, Countess of Chesterfield =

British heiress and racehorse breeder

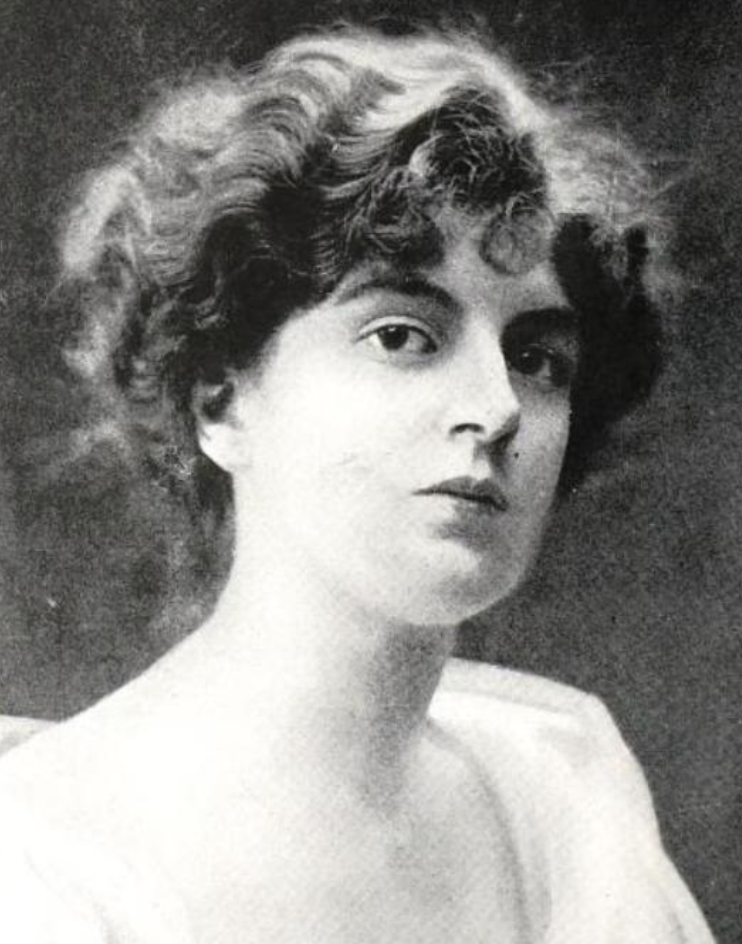
Enid Scudamore-Stanhope, Countess of Chesterfield, from a 1904 publication

Enid Edith Scudamore-Stanhope, Countess of Chesterfield (10 September 1878 – 30 November 1957) was a British heiress and racehorse breeder. Born at Marske Hall in Yorkshire, she was the fourth child of Charles Wilson, 1st Baron Nunburnholme, and Florence Wellesley, daughter of Col. William Wellesley and great-niece to Arthur, Duke of Wellington.

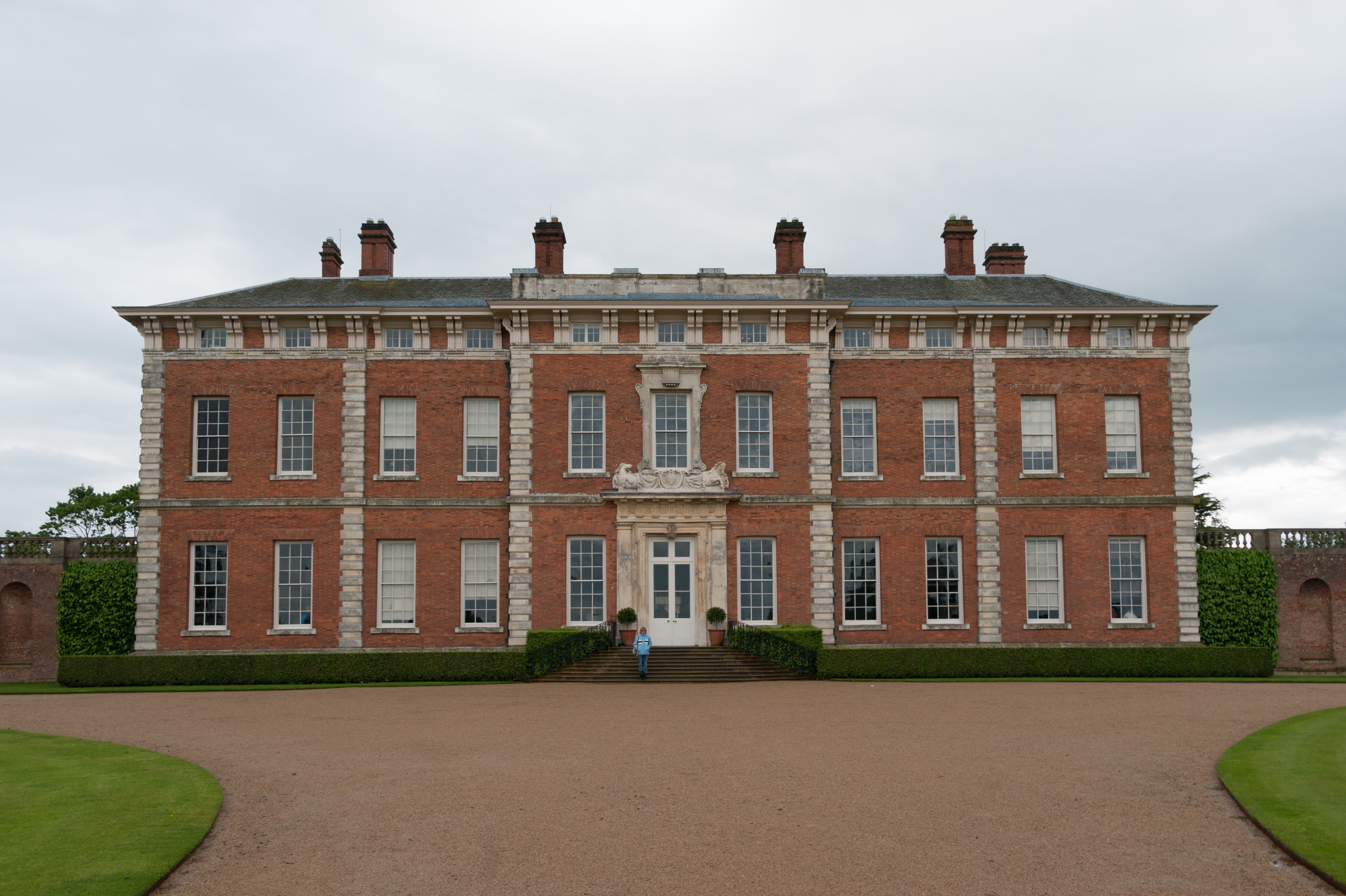
Beningbrough Hall, North Yorkshire

On 15 February 1900, at the age of 21, she married in London Edwyn Scudamore-Stanhope, 10th Earl of Chesterfield, an eligible bachelor more than twice her age. They lived at Beningbrough Hall in Yorkshire, a property which her mother bought for the couple as a belated wedding present. In the early 1920s Lady Chesterfield set up a stud farm at Beningbrough Hall and bred thoroughbred racehorses, one of which called Sun Castle won the 1941 St Leger Stakes.

She was the last person to live at Beningbrough Hall where she was from 1917 until her death as a widow in 1957. Her husband the Earl had died in 1933. The couple had no children and Beningbrough was then acquired by the National Trust in lieu of death duties.
