= Edwyn Scudamore-Stanhope, 10th Earl of Chesterfield =

British peer and courtier

The Right Honourable The Earl of Chesterfield KG GCVO PC
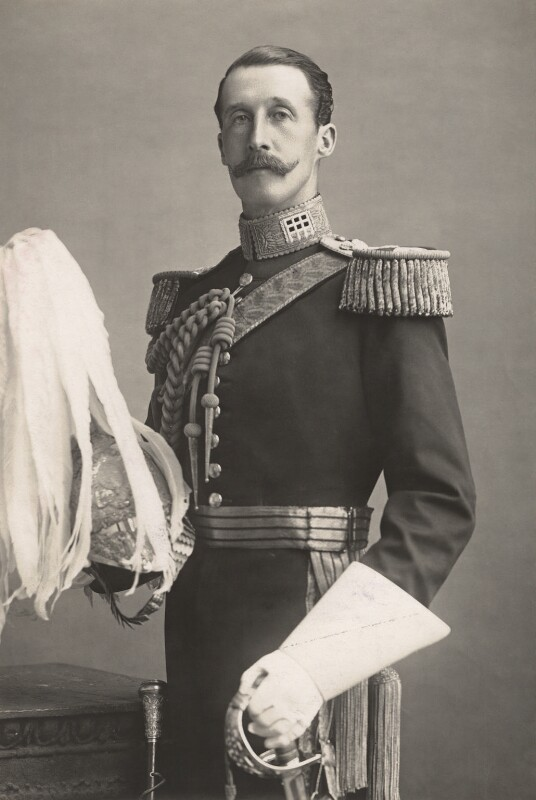

Lord Steward of the Household
- In office 22 June 1910 – 9 June 1915
- Monarch: George V
- Prime Minister: H. H. Asquith
- Preceded by: The Earl Beauchamp
- Succeeded by: The Viscount Farquhar

Master of the Horse
- In office 9 June 1915 – 19 October 1922
- Monarch: George V
- Prime Minister: H. H. Asquith; David Lloyd George
- Preceded by: The Earl of Granard
- Succeeded by: The Marquess of Bath

Personal details
- Born: 15 March 1854 Rome, Lazio, Italy
- Died: 24 January 1933 (aged 78)
- Party: Liberal
- Spouse: Enid Wilson (1878–1957)
- Parent(s): Henry Scudamore-Stanhope, 9th Earl of Chesterfield; Dorothea Hay
- Education: Brasenose College, Oxford

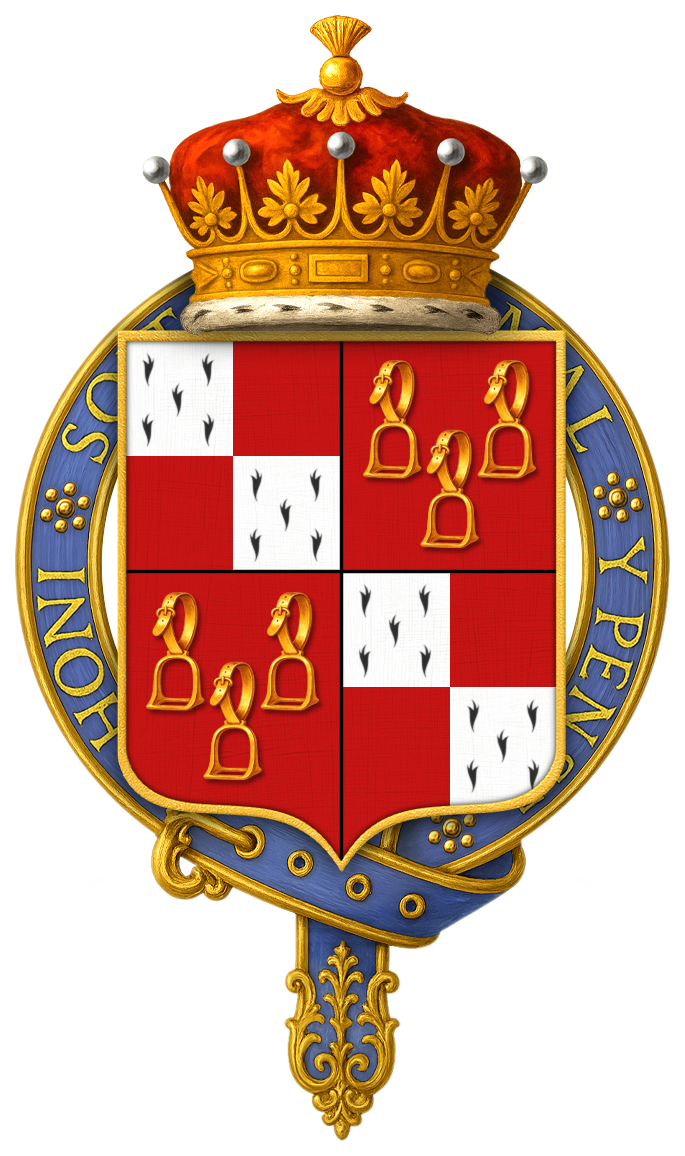
Garter-encircled arms of Edwyn Scudamore-Stanhope, 10th Earl of Chesterfield, KG, GCVO, PC

Edwyn Francis Scudamore-Stanhope, 10th Earl of Chesterfield (15 March 1854 – 24 January 1933), styled Lord Stanhope between 1883 and 1887, was a British peer and courtier.

== Background and education ==
Scudamore-Stanhope was the eldest child of Henry Scudamore-Stanhope, 9th Earl of Chesterfield, by Dorothea Hay, daughter of Sir Adam Hay, 7th Baronet. He was educated at Eton and Brasenose College, Oxford, where he graduated in 1877 with a BA degree. He was a practising barrister in 1877.

== Political career ==
Scudamore-Stanhope was Assistant Private Secretary to the Chancellor of the Exchequer in 1886. The following year he took his seat in the House of Lords on the death of his father. He served under William Ewart Gladstone as Treasurer of the Household between 1892 and 1894 and under Lord Rosebery as Captain of the Honourable Corps of Gentlemen at Arms between 1894 and 1895, and was sworn of the Privy Council on 30 April 1894. He was later Lord Steward of the Household under H. H. Asquith from 1910 to 1915 and Master of the Horse under Asquith and then David Lloyd George between 1915 and 1922. He was invested as a Knight Companion of the Garter on 1 January 1915.

== Family ==
Lord Chesterfield married the Hon. Enid Edith Wilson, second daughter of Charles Wilson, 1st Baron Nunburnholme, on 15 February 1900 at St. Mark's Church, North Audley Street, Mayfair, London. They lived initially at Holme Lacy House, the Stanhope seat in Herefordshire, which the Earl had inherited from his father, but which he sold in 1909, having previously sold the contents in 1902. They lived afterwards at Beningbrough Hall in Yorkshire, a property which her father bought for the couple as a belated wedding present. They did not have any children.

Lord Chesterfield died in London on 24 January 1933, aged 78 and was buried in the Church of St Cuthbert in Holme Lacy, Herefordshire. Having no heirs, his titles were inherited by his younger brother, Henry.

Political offices
| Preceded by Lord Walter Gordon-Lennox | Treasurer of the Household; 1892–1894 | Succeeded by Hon. Arthur Brand |
| Preceded by The Lord Vernon | Captain of the Honourable Corps of Gentlemen-at-Arms; 1894–1895 | Succeeded by The Lord Belper |
| Preceded by The Earl Beauchamp | Lord Steward of the Household; 1910–1915 | Succeeded by The Viscount Farquhar |
| Preceded by The Earl of Granard | Master of the Horse; 1915–1922 | Succeeded by The Marquess of Bath |
Peerage of England
| Preceded by Henry Scudamore-Stanhope | Earl of Chesterfield; 1887–1933 | Succeeded by Henry Scudamore-Stanhope |
