= Henry Scudamore-Stanhope, 11th Earl of Chesterfield =

British Royal Navy officer and nobleman

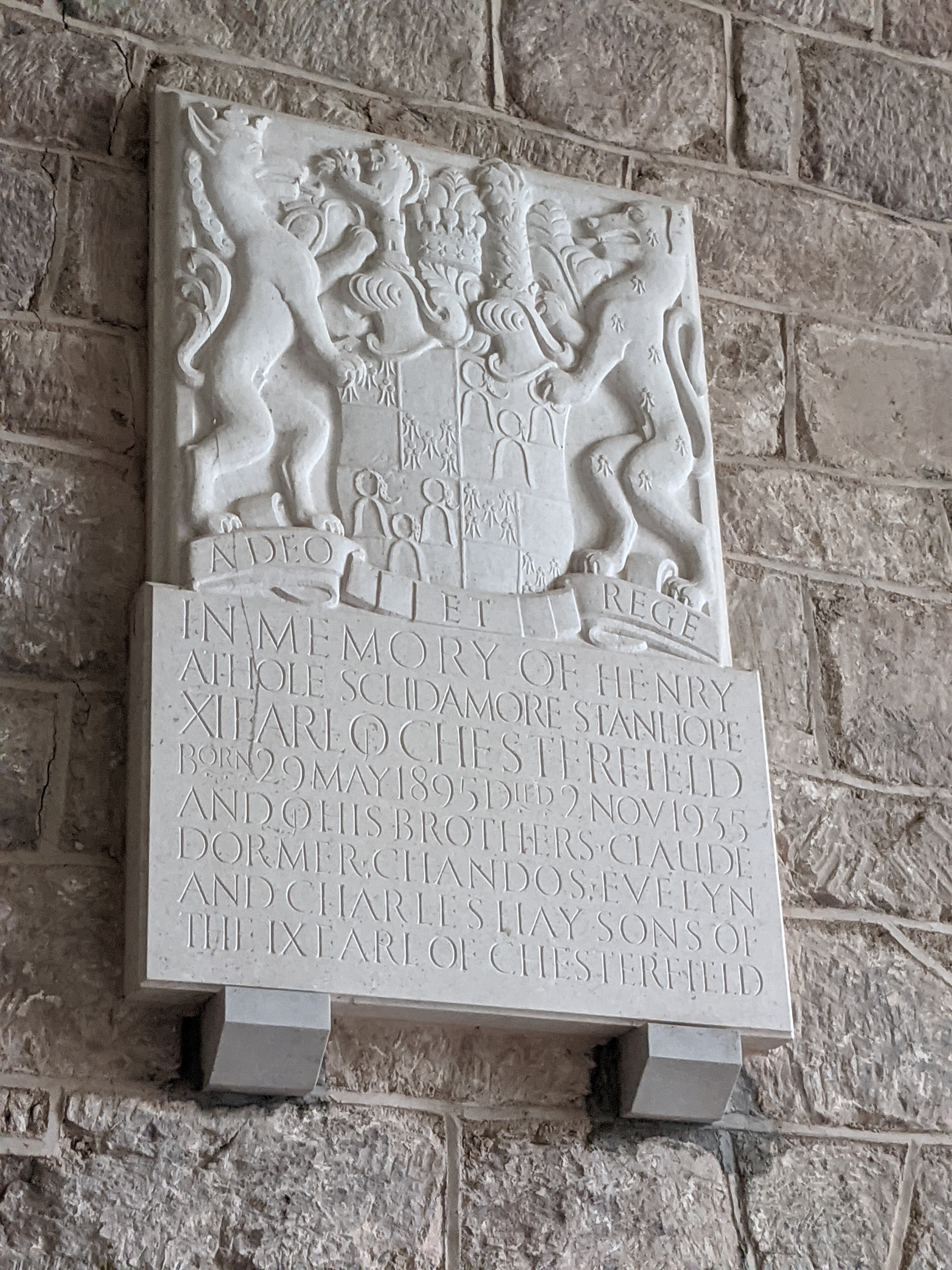
Monument to Henry Scudamore-Stanhope in Holme Lacy

Henry Athole Scudamore-Stanhope, 11th Earl of Chesterfield (29 May 1855 – 2 November 1935) was a British Royal Navy officer and nobleman.

Stanhope was the second son of Henry Edwyn Chandos Scudamore-Stanhope, 9th Earl of Chesterfield and Dorothea Hay, daughter of Sir Adam Hay, 7th Baronet, of Smithfield. He joined the Navy in 1869. As lieutenant of the flagship HMS Alexandra he served with the Naval Brigade landed for service in the Sudan with the Nile Expedition for the relief of General Gordon at Khartoum in 1884–85. He aftwards commanded the Lotus on the Nile, and received the Egyptian medal with clasp and the Khedive's bronze star. He was promoted to command in 1892, and served in the Naval Intelligence Department from January, 1894, to November, 1896. He was in command of the sloop HMS Beagle, serving on the South Atlantic Station until it returned to Portsmouth to pay off on 14 March 1900. He retired from the navy with the rank of captain in 1905.

In January, 1933, he succeeded his brother as eleventh earl.

Lord Chesterfield died unmarried on 2 November 1935 and was buried at Holme Lacy Church, Herefordshire on 7 November. He was succeeded by his nephew, Edward Henry Scudamore-Stanhope, the only son of his brother, The Honourable Evelyn Scudamore-Stanhope.

Peerage of England
Preceded by Edwyn Francis Scudamore-Stanhope	Earl of Chesterfield; 1933–1935	Succeeded by Edward Henry Scudamore-Stanhope
