= Henry Scudamore-Stanhope, 9th Earl of Chesterfield =

British peer

Henry Edwyn Chandos Scudamore-Stanhope, 9th Earl of Chesterfield, DL, JP (8 April 1821 – 21 January 1887) was a British peer.

== Life and family ==
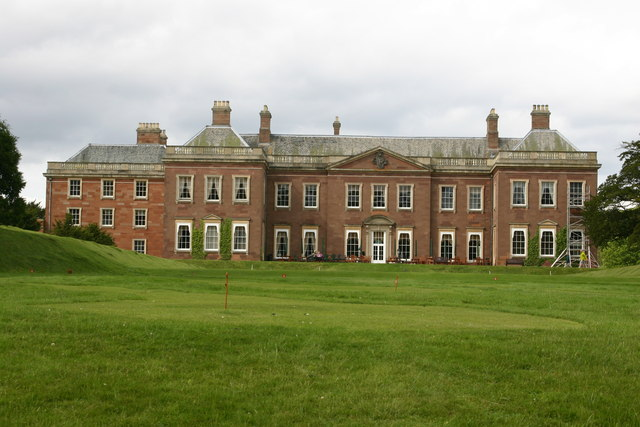
Holme Lacy House

He was the eldest of four sons of Sir Edwyn Francis Scudamore-Stanhope, 2nd Baronet.

He married Dorothea Hay, daughter of Sir Adam Hay, 7th Baronet Hay of Smithfield, on 6 August 1851 at St. Johns church, Edinburgh, Scotland. Together they had six sons, including Edwyn Francis Scudamore-Stanhope, 10th Earl of Chesterfield and Henry Athole Scudamore-Stanhope, 11th Earl of Chesterfield.

In 1874, he inherited the baronetcy and the estate of Holme Lacy in Herefordshire, previously the property of the deranged Frances Scudamore, Duchess of Norfolk, which had been settled in favour of his father after years of litigation.

In 1883, he succeeded his fourth cousin once removed, George Philip Stanhope, 8th Earl of Chesterfield, as 9th Earl. He died on 21 January 1887 at the Victoria Hotel in St Leonards-on-Sea. He was succeeded as 10th Earl by his first son, Edwyn Francis Scudamore-Stanhope.

Peerage of England
Preceded by George Stanhope	Earl of Chesterfield; 1883–1887	Succeeded by Edwyn Scudamore-Stanhope
Baronetage of the United Kingdom
Preceded by Edwyn Scudamore-Stanhope	Baronet (of Stanwell); 1874–1887	Succeeded by Edwyn Scudamore-Stanhope
